= Speed sailing =

Speed sailing is the art of sailing a craft as fast as possible over a predetermined route, and having its overall or peak speed recorded and accredited by a regulatory body. The term usually refers to sailing on water, even though sailing on land and ice is progressively faster because of the lower friction involved. The World Sailing Speed Record Council is the body authorized by the World Sailing to confirm speed records of sailing craft (boats or sailboards) on water (not on ice or land).

== Sailing craft used ==
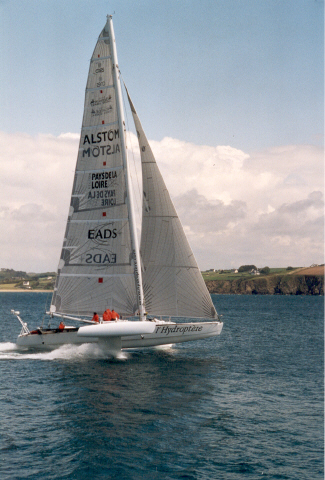
The experimental sailing craft Hydroptère, uses hydrofoils to reduce friction

The craft used vary from single sailor windsurfers or kitesurfers, to multi-hulls with crews of fifteen people. Many short course record attempts are made with boats based on the classic proa boat layout. Recent developments include hulls that rely on hydrofoils or planing hulls, which allow the hull to lift out of the water, and thereby increases speed by reducing friction. An example of a multihull hydrofoil design is the Hydroptère, designed by Alain Thébault. The design is based on experience from a range of hydrofoil sailcraft that Thébault built in cooperation with the late Eric Tabarly since the 1990s. On 4 September 2009, l’Hydroptère broke the world record, sustaining a speed of 51.36 knots for 500m in 30 knots of wind. On 24 November 2012, Vestas Sailrocket 2 raised the bar to 65.45 knots, a record which still stands.

Throughout the 1970s, the speed sailing 500 meter and Nautical Mile records were dominated by large multihulls, as typified by the Crossbow and Crossbow II of Timothy Colman. This has changed since to smaller, very lightweight boats. The Yellow Pages Endeavour, a highly optimized one-way proa design using a rigid wingsail lost its decade old 1993 500m record to a windsurfer in 2004. This was followed by frequently changing records, with windsurfers holding the record through 2008, when it was taken by a succession of kitesurfers. In 2009, in a radical shift away from the tiny surfboard based craft, the trimaran Hydroptère, with a length of 18.28 meters and a displacement of 6.5 metric tons, took the 500m speed record back for the D class boats.

=== Windsurfing ===
Antoine Albeau holds the windsurfing speed record (on the 500-metre course) with a speed of 53.27 knots (2015, Lüderitz speed canal, Namibia, beating his own previous record of 49.09 knots (90,91 km/h) from 2008, on the purpose built Saintes Marie de la Mer canal in Southern France. The previous record of 48.7 knots (90,19 km/h) was held by Finian Maynard, an Irish born windsurfer who sails for the British Virgin Islands who achieved this speed on 10 April 2005 on the same purpose-built canal. Between 1988 and 2009, A total of 8 Outright Sailing Speed Records were set on The Canal in Saintes Marie De la Mer starting with the first outright record above 40 knots by British speed windsurfer Erik Beale at 40.48 knots, 1988 and subsequent records by Pascal Maka, 42.91 knots, 1990; Thierry Bielak, 45.34, 1993; Finian Maynard 48.70, 2008 and finally Antoine Albeau 49.09, 2009. Windsurfers are not as efficient as the larger boats used in record attempts. Albeau's 49.09 knot record was set in winds of 45 to 50 knots, while the Yellow Pages Endeavour, which held a record of 46.52 knots from 1993 to 2004, was optimized to sail in a 19 knot wind. Venue has much to do with the windsurfer's success, as all windsurfing 500m records since 1988 have been made at the same canal. Zara Davis holds the outright nautical mile record for a woman, set in Walvis Bay Namibia, an open water venue, in November 2006. The previous record was held by Valerie Ghibaudo of France

=== Kitesurfing ===
Frenchman kitesurfer Sebastien Cattelan became the first sailor to break the 50 knots barrier with 50.26 knots on 3 October 2008 at the Lüderitz Speed Challenge in Namibia. On 4 October 2008 Frenchman Alex Caizergues, also using a kite, broke this record with a 50.57 knots run. Earlier in the event, on 19 September, kitesurfer Rob Douglas (United States) made a 49.84 knots (92.30 km/h) run, becoming the first kitesurfer to establish an outright speed sailing world record – held until that date only by sailboats or windsurfers. Douglas also became the world's third over-50 knots sailor, when on 8 September he made a 50.54 knots (93.60 km/h) run. The current speed record over a 500 meter (1,640 ft) course for a kiteboard, officially ratified by the World Sailing Speed Record Council, is 55.65 kn, held by Robert Douglas, and set in Luderitz, Namibia in October 2010.

The WSSRC Nautical Mile record for kitesurfing was originally set in Walvis Bay, Namibia in 2005 by Dirk Hanel (GER) at 35.44 kn, and broken again in 2006 by Rob Munro (GB) at Walvis Bay, 35.65 kn. Munro remains the current world speedsailing record holder for kitesurfing over the nautical mile. Aurelia Herpin (FRA) holds the women's record of 29.83 kn.

== Longest distance run in 24 hours ==
The records for the longest distance sailed within 24 hours are also recorded by the WSSRC. There are different categories:

- Outright (crewed and single-handed)
- Monohull (crewed < 60 foot and single-handed)

The class VO70 has proven itself to be the fastest distance monohull sailboat class ever built. Today all major distance monohull records are established by VO70's. For example, in October 2008 the yacht Ericsson 4 officially travelled 596.6 nautical miles in 24 hours, establishing a 24-hour monohull record. Skipper Torben Grael and his crew made the record on the first leg of the 2008-2009 Volvo Ocean Race. They sailed Ericsson 4 hard as a strong cold front hit the fleet, bringing winds approaching 40 knots, and propelling the yacht at an average speed of 24.8 knots.

=== Notable performances ===
During her Jules-Verne trophy record in 2011–2012, the Banque Populaire V skippered by Loïck Peyron covered 811.70 nautical miles in 24 hours on 3 December 2011 at 11:45 UT, posting 28 days over 600 miles, including 9 days over 700 miles and 1 day over 800 miles.

During her Jules-Verne trophy record in 2009–2010, the trimaran Groupama 3 skippered by Franck Cammas covered 798 nautical miles in 24 hours on 13 February 2010 at 5 p.m. UT, showing 17 days over 600 miles, including 10 days over 700 miles.

During her Jules-Verne trophy record in 2016–2017, the trimaran Idec sport skippered by Francis Joyon covered 894 nautical miles in 24 hours, and 10 consecutive days at 809 miles / 24 h. Francis Joyon rounds Cape Horn, 16 days after riding off of South America, and after a course of nearly 12,000 miles above an average of 30 knots (730.16 miles / 24 h over 16 days). He then signs a performance increase of between 30 and 40% compared to the record to be broken by Loïck Peyron 5 years earlier. Leaving the southern seas with a lead of 4 j 06 h 35 min over Loïck Peyron's previous record, Francis Joyon and his crew regained the equivalent of 2,800 miles on the record during this episode.

During the aborted attempt of 2019, Yann Guichard sets a new record crossing the equator in 4 days 19 h 57 min and, thanks to favorable weather conditions, lines up 4,812.1 miles from the 11th to 16th day, or 802 miles / day for 6 consecutive days.

During his record around the world Singlehanded in 2017, 24 hour distance record for François Gabart on Macif: 850,68 miles in 24h.

During his attempt for the Jules Verne Trophy on 5 December 2020, Thomas Coville on fr:Sodebo Ultim 3 covered 889.9 miles in 24 hours (37.1 knots average, top speed 48.9 knots).

During his attempt for the Jules Verne Trophy on 21 December 2024, François Gabart on SVR-Lazartigue covered 892.2 miles in 24 hours (37.2 knots average, top speed over 50 knots).
