= Vestas Sailrocket =

Hydrofoil boat

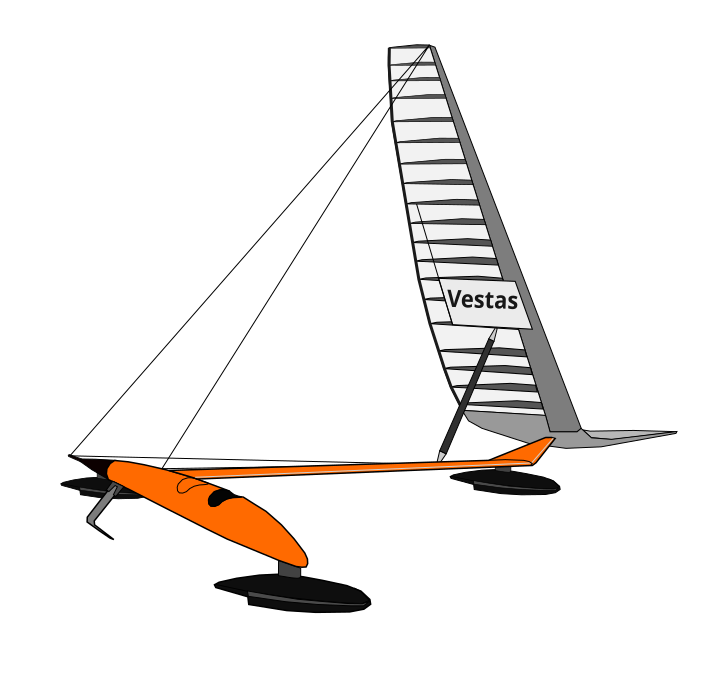

Racing career
- Skippers: Paul Larsen

The Vestas Sailrocket was built to capture the sailing speed record competing in the B-class for 150 to 235 square feet of sail. It is piloted by the project leader Paul Larsen and sponsored by Danish wind turbines manufacturer Vestas. In 2008, the first version reached a reported unofficial speed of 52.22 knots (96.71 km/h), before crashing.

After being upgraded to a second version, the Vestas Sailrocket 2 began a campaign to break speed records in November 2012 off Walvis Bay, Namibia. On 12 November, it made a 54.08 knots (100.16 km/h) run over a 500-metre (1,600 ft) distance, then 59.23 knots (109.69 km/h) on the 16th. It attained 55.32 knots (102.45 km/h) on a 1-mile (1.6 km) run on the 18th and simultaneously 59.38 knots (109.97 km/h) on 500 metres. On 24 November, with wind speeds at roughly 25 knots (46 km/h), it ran the 500-metre course at 65.45 knots (121.21 km/h) with a 68.01-knot (125.95 km/h) peak. Both records are ratified by the World Sailing Speed Record Council (WSSRC) for the 500m and the mile.

A Swiss team of École Polytechnique Fédérale de Lausanne university students and engineers, including members involved in the development of previous record-holder Hydroptère, formed in October 2019 to develop a new hydrofoil boat, SP80, to exceed the Vestas Sailrocket 2 record in 2022, with a target speed of 80 knots. As of April 2023, the speed record attempts were pushed back to 2024 and are scheduled to take place in Leucate.

== See also ==
External media

Images
- Vestas Sailrocket at 65+ knots

Video
- 500 metre at 65.37 knots video

- Yellow Pages Endeavour
- Speed sailing record
- Speed sailing
- Proa
