= Operation Lion (1942) =

- Part of the Pacific War of World War II
Date	24 June – 7 November 1942
Location	Central Celebes, Dutch East Indies
Result	Japanese victory

Belligerents
Netherlands; Australia	Empire of Japan

Commanders and leaders
First Lieutenant I.H.T. Hees (MIA)	Unknown

Strength
3	Unknown

Casualties and losses
3 missing	Unknown

Operation Lion was formed to establish an intelligence centre on central Sulawesi (called Celebes at the time). First Lieutenant I.H.T. Hees, 1st Cl. B. Belloni, a telegraphist and Sailor J.L. Brandon comprised the party which left Darwin by the prahu Somoa on 24 June 1942, to land near Wotoe, 60 kilometres (37 mi) west of Malili, on Celebes. Lieutenant Hees had previously worked as an engineer for the department of public works and it was hoped he could contact one of his "mandoers" (overseers). The party was contacted by radio on 7 November 1942, however their signals were too weak to be received. On 14 December 1942, two Dutch NCO's (from the NEI Section) were in Darwin awaiting movement to LION party, but it was suspected that LION had come under Japanese control they were not dispatched.

On 5 January 1945, a party of five Indonesians under the codename of Operation Apricot left Darwin to ascertain the fate of Operation Lion. The leader was captured; the remainder were evacuated by Catalina flying boat on 31 January 1945.

== Bibliography ==
- "The Official History of the Operations and Administration of Special Operations – Australia [(SOA), also known as the Inter-Allied Services Department (ISD) and Services Reconnaissance Department (SRD)] Volume 2 – Operations – Copy No. 1 [for Director, Military Intelligence (DMI), Headquarters (HQ), Australian Military Forces (AMF), Melbourne. Part 1 page 6-7". National Archives of Australia. p. 32.
- National Archives Australia (1942–1945) – [SRD (Services Reconnaissance Department) HQ] NEI [Netherlands East Indies] Section IASD [Inter-Allied Services Department].
