= ISWC =

ISWC may refer to:

- International Semantic Web Conference
- International Symposium on Wearable Computers
- International Standard Musical Work Code
- International Speed Windsurfing Class
