= List of speed sailing records =

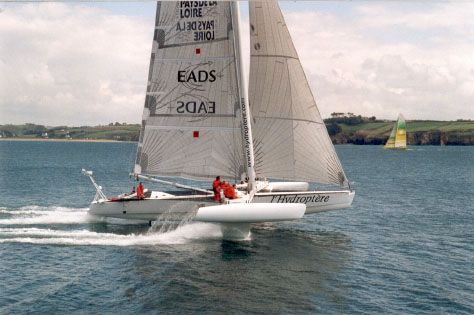
l'Hydroptère, the previous nautical mile record holder

Speed sailing records are sanctioned, since 1972, by the World Sailing Speed Record Council (WSSRC). Records are measured either by average speed over a specified distance or by total distance traveled during a specified time interval. The three most sought after records are the:

- 500 metre (or "outright") record is held by Paul Larsen. On 24 November 2012 he sailed the Vestas Sailrocket 2 at 65.45 knots in Walvis Bay, Namibia.
- Nautical mile record is held by Paul Larsen. On 18 November 2012 he sailed the Vestas Sailrocket 2 at 55.32 knots in Walvis Bay, Namibia.
- 24 Hour distance record is held by Pascal Bidégorry. On 1 August 2009 he sailed the Banque Populaire V 908 nautical miles (at 37.84 knots). This was while he was breaking the northern Atlantic record.

== 500 metre records ==
Date	Craft	Skipper	Location	Speed (knots)	Speed (km/h)	Speed (mph)	Comment
24 November 2012	Vestas Sailrocket 2	Paul Larsen AUS	Walvis Bay, NAM	65.45	121.1	75.2	First record above 60 knots
18 November 2012	Vestas Sailrocket 2	Paul Larsen AUS	Walvis Bay, NAM	59.23	109.69	68.1	
28 October 2010	Kitesurf	Robert Douglas USA	Lüderitz, NAM	55.65	103.06	64.0	
28 October 2010	Kitesurf	Sebastien Cattelan FRA	Lüderitz, NAM	55.49	102.76	63.8	14 minutes before Robert Douglas' record. Homologated by the WSSRC.
12 October 2010	Kitesurf	Alexandre Caizergues FRA	Lüderitz, NAM	54.10	100.19	62.3	First record above 100 km/h
4 September 2009	l'Hydroptère - hydrofoil trimaran	Alain Thébault FRA	Hyères FRA	51.36	95.11	59.1	Nautical mile record broken on the same run. An instantaneous maximum speed of 55 knots was recorded.
2008	Kitesurf	Alexandre Caizergues FRA	Lüderitz, NAM	50.57	93.65	58.2	
2008	Kitesurf	Sebastien Cattelan FRA	Lüderitz, NAM	50.26	93.08	57.8	First record above 50 knots
2008	Kitesurf	Robert Douglas USA	Lüderitz, NAM	49.84	92.30	57.4	
2008	Windsurf	Antoine Albeau FRA	Stes.Maries, FRA	49.09	90.91	56.5	
2005	Windsurf	Finian Maynard IRL	Stes.Maries, FRA	48.70	90.19	56.0	
2004	Windsurf	Finian Maynard IRL	Stes.Maries, FRA	46.82	86.71	53.9	
1993	Yellow Pages Endeavour - proa	Simon McKeon AUS	Sandy Point, AUS	46.52	86.15	53.5	
1991	Windsurf	Thierry Bielak FRA	Stes.Maries, FRA	44.66	82.71	51.4	
1990	Windsurf	Pascal Maka FRA	Stes.Maries, FRA	43.06	79.74	49.5	
1989	Catamaran Techniques Avancées	Gérard Navarin FRA	Stes-Maries (France)	42,12	78	48,47	
1988	Windsurf	Erik Beale GBR	Stes.Maries, FRA	40.48	74.96	46.6	First record above 40 knots
1986	Windsurf	Pascal Maka FRA	Sotavento, SP	38.86	71.96	44.7	
1980	Crossbow II catamaran	Tim Colman GBR	Portland, UK	36.00	66.67	41.4	
1977	Crossbow II catamaran	Tim Colman GBR	Portland, UK	34.40	63.70	39.6	
1977	Crossbow II catamaran	Tim Colman GBR	Portland, UK	33.80	62.59	38.9	
1975	Crossbow II catamaran	Tim Colman GBR	Portland, UK	31.80	58.89	36.6	
1975	Crossbow proa	Tim Colman GBR	Portland, UK	31.10	57.59	35.8	First record above 30 knots
1973	Crossbow proa	Tim Colman GBR	Portland, UK	29.30	54.26	33.7	
1972	Crossbow (proa)	Tim Colman GBR	Portland, UK	26.30	48.70	30.3	First record above 30 mph

=== Class records ===
Last updated: 19 November 2012.

Category	Date	Craft	Skipper	Location	Speed (knots)	Speed (km/h)
D Class (Over 300 ft^{2})	4 September 2009	l'Hydroptère	Alain Thébault FRA	Hyères FRA	51.36	95.11
C Class (Up to 300 ft^{2} (27.88 m^{2}))	2009	Macquarie Innovation	Simon McKeon AUS	Sandy Point, AUS	50.07	92.72
B Class (Up to 235 ft^{2} (21.84 m^{2}))	2012	Vestas Sailrocket 2	Paul Larsen AUS	Walvis Bay, NAM	65.45	121.1
A Class (Up to 150 ft^{2} (13.93 m^{2}))	1992	Longshot	Russel Long USA	Tarifa, SP	43.55	80.65
10 m^{2} (Up to 10 m^{2})	2015	Windsurfer	Antoine Albeau FRA	Lüderitz, NAM	53.27	98.66
Kite Sailing	2013	Kitesurfer	Alex Caizergues FRA	Salin-de-Giraud, FRA	56.62	104.86

== Nautical mile records ==
Date	Craft	Skipper	Location	Speed (knots)	Speed (km/h)	
18 November 2012	Vestas Sailrocket 2	Paul Larsen AUS	Walvis Bay, NAM	55.32	102.45	
8 November 2009	l'Hydroptère	Alain Thébault FRA	Hyères FRA	50.17	92.91	.
4 September 2009	l'Hydroptère	Alain Thébault FRA	Hyères FRA	48.72	90.23	500 metre record broken on the same run.
Oct 2008	l'Hydroptère	Alain Thébault FRA	Port Saint-Louis FRA	43.09	79.80	
April 2007	l'Hydroptère	Alain Thébault FRA	Baie de Quiberon FRA	41.69	77.21	
October 2006	Windsurfer	Bjorn Dunkerbeck ND	Walvis bay, Namibia	41.14	76.19	
October 2005	Windsurfer	Finian Maynard IRL	Walvis bay, Namibia	39.97	74.02	
November 2004	Windsurfer	Bjorn Dunkerbeck ND	Port Saint-Louis FRA	34.44	63.78	
July 2003	Windsurfer	Bjorn Dunkerbeck ND	Aringa, Grand Canaria	33.96	62.89	

== Day's run ==
A Day's run is the distance traveled by a vessel in one day, normally measured from noon to noon. This was the traditional measure used in the days of packet and clipper ships and varied in the actual time dependent on whether the vessel was sailing east or west. The records certified by the WSSRC since 1994 are based on a 24-hour distance measure irrespective of longitude.

== 24 hour distance record ==
Distance	Yacht	Skipper	Crew	Date	Competition	Average speed
436 nmi (807 km; 502 mi)	(United Kingdom) Lightning	James Nolan "Bully" Forbes		1 March 1854		18.16 knots (33.63 km/h; 20.90 mph)
465 nmi (861 km; 535 mi)	(United States) Champion of the Seas	Alexander Newlands		11 December 1854		19.375 knots (35.883 km/h; 22.296 mph)
512 nmi (948 km; 589 mi)	(Canada) Formule Tag	Michael Birch		1984		21.33 knots (39.50 km/h; 24.55 mph)
517 nmi (957 km; 595 mi)	(France) Fleury Michon VIII	Philippe Poupon		1987		21.54 knots (39.89 km/h; 24.79 mph)
522.73 nmi (968.10 km; 601.55 mi)	(France) Jet Services V	Serge Madec		1990		21.85 knots (40.47 km/h; 25.14 mph)
524.63 nmi (971.61 km; 603.73 mi)	(France) Lyonnaise des eaux	Olivier de Kersauson		1994		21.91 knots (40.58 km/h; 25.21 mph)
540 nmi (1,000 km; 620 mi)	(France) Primagaz	Laurent Bourgnon (singlehanded)	1	1994		22.50 knots (41.67 km/h; 25.89 mph)
547.3 nmi (1,013.6 km; 629.8 mi)	(France) Explorer	Bruno Peyron		1994		22.80 knots (42.23 km/h; 26.24 mph)
590.23 nmi (1,093.11 km; 679.22 mi)	(United States) PlayStation	Steve Fossett		1999		24.59 knots (45.54 km/h; 28.30 mph)
625.7 nmi (1,158.8 km; 720.0 mi)	(France) Club Med	Bruno Peyron & Grant Dalton	14	11 November 2000		26.07 knots (48.28 km/h; 30.00 mph)
629.5 nmi (1,165.8 km; 724.4 mi)	(France) Innovation Explorer	Loick Peyron	13	2001	The Race	26.23 knots (48.58 km/h; 30.18 mph)
655.2 nmi (1,213.4 km; 754.0 mi)	(France) Club Med	Grant Dalton		2001		27.30 knots (50.56 km/h; 31.42 mph)
687.17 nmi (1,272.64 km; 790.78 mi)	(United States) PlayStation	Steve Fossett		2001		28.63 knots (53.02 km/h; 32.95 mph)
694.78 nmi (1,286.73 km; 799.54 mi)	(United Kingdom) Maiden II	Adrienne Cahalan, Helena Darvelid & Brian Thompson		2002		28.95 knots (53.62 km/h; 33.32 mph)
706.2 nmi (1,307.9 km; 812.7 mi)	(France) Orange II	Bruno Peyron		2004		29.43 knots (54.50 km/h; 33.87 mph)
766.8 nmi (1,420.1 km; 882.4 mi)	(France) Orange II	Bruno Peyron		3 July 2006		31.95 knots (59.17 km/h; 36.77 mph)
794 nmi (1,470 km; 914 mi)	(France) Groupama 3	Franck Cammas	10	20 July 2007		33.08 knots (61.26 km/h; 38.07 mph)
907.9 nmi (1,681.4 km; 1,044.8 mi)	(France) Banque Populaire V	Pascal Bidégorry	11	August 2009		37.83 knots (70.06 km/h; 43.53 mph)

Note that the nineteenth century records are not strictly compatible as they measure a "Day's run" which was measured noon to noon regardless of longitude. The two entries above were both eastbound and therefore less than 24 hours.

=== Notable performances ===
During her Jules Verne Trophy record in 2011-2012, the Banque Populaire V skippered by Loïck Peyron covered 811.70 nautical miles in 24 hours on 3 December 2011 at 11:45 UT, posting 28 days over 600 miles, including 9 days over 700 miles and 1 day over 800 miles.

During her Jules-Verne trophy record in 2009-2010, the trimaran Groupama 3 skippered by Franck Cammas covered 798 nautical miles in 24 hours on 13 February 2010 at 5 p.m. UT, showing 17 days over 600 miles, including 10 days over 700 miles.

During her Jules-Verne trophy record in 2016-2017, the trimaran Idec sport in the hands of Francis Joyon and his crew of Clément Surtel, Alex Pella, Bernard Stamm, Gwénolé Gahinet and Sébastien Audigane, covered 894 nautical miles in 24 hours, and 10 consecutive days at 809 miles / 24 h. Francis Joyon rounds Cape Horn, 16 days after riding off of South America, and after a course of nearly 12,000 miles above an average of 30 knots (730.16 miles / 24 h over 16 days). He then signs a performance increase of between 30 and 40% compared to the record to be broken by Loïck Peyron 5 years earlier. Leaving the southern seas with a lead of 4 j 06 h 35 min over Loïck Peyron's previous record, Francis Joyon, Clément Surtel, Alex Pella, Bernard Stamm, Gwénolé Gahinet and Sébastien Audigane regained the equivalent of 2,800 miles on the record during this episode.

During the aborted attempt of 2019, Yann Guichard sets a new record crossing the equator in 4 days 19 h 57 min and, thanks to favorable weather conditions, lines up 4,812.1 miles from the 11th to 16th day, or 802 miles / day for 6 consecutive days.

24 hour distance record for Armel Le Cléac'h on Banque Populaire VII: 682,85 miles in 24 hours singlehanded on 26 January 2014 (28,45 knots).

During his record around the world Singlehanded in 2017, 24 hour distance record for François Gabart on Macif: 850,68 miles in 24h.

During his attempt for the Jules Verne Trophy on 5 December 2020, Thomas Coville on fr:Sodebo Ultim 3 covered 889.9 miles in 24 hours (37.1 knots average, top speed 48.9 knots).

During his attempt for the Jules Verne Trophy on 21 December 2024, François Gabart on SVR-Lazartigue covered 892.2 miles in 24 hours (37.2 knots average, top speed over 50 knots).

During the return trip after his victory in the 2021 Transat Jacques-Vabre, Charles Caudrelier broke two unofficial records on the fr:Maxi Edmond de Rothschild: in false solo training, he reached 50.7 knots, and covered 880 miles in 24 hours at an average speed of 36.6 knots. This last record cannot be approved for a lack of adequate equipment on board.

== 124 hour Boston Teapot record ==
The Boston Teapot Trophy is an annual award given by Sail Training International to a sail training vessel that covers the greatest distance under sail within a 124-hour period. A vessel must have a waterline length exceeding 30 feet (9.14 m) with a majority of the crew under 25 years of age.

The Guinness World Records officially acknowledged Statsraad Lehmkuhl's record in 2016.

The top five distances recorded since the start of the race in 1964 have been :

Distance	Average speed	Ship	Date	Ref
1,556 nmi (2,882 km; 1,791 mi)	12.5 knots (23.2 km/h; 14.4 mph)	(Norway) Statsraad Lehmkuhl	2016	
1,394 nmi (2,582 km; 1,604 mi)	11.2 knots (20.7 km/h; 12.9 mph)	(Japan) Kaiwo Maru	1995	
1,350 nmi (2,500 km; 1,550 mi)	10.8 knots (20.0 km/h; 12.4 mph)	(Japan) Kaiwo Maru	1990	
1,335 nmi (2,472 km; 1,536 mi)	10.7 knots (19.8 km/h; 12.3 mph)	(Argentina) ARA Libertad	1966	
1,312 nmi (2,430 km; 1,510 mi)	10.5 knots (19.4 km/h; 12.1 mph)	(Japan) Kaiwo Maru	1994	

== Instantaneous speed record ==
The idea of an instantaneous speed record is not officially sanctioned by the WSSRC and is, therefore, not officially measured or documented. The highest speed ever reported is from the crew of Vestas Sailrocket 2 : on 24 November 2012 they recorded a top speed of 68.33 knots in a 25–29-knot wind.

Previously, the highest speed ever reported was from the crew of l'Hydroptère. During an attempt on 21 December 2008 at Port-Saint-Louis-du-Rhône, they recorded a top speed of approximately 61 knots (speed not verified or registered on any onboard instrumentation) during a 45 knot gust of wind. This heavy gust of wind overpowered the sailboat, causing it to capsize at high speed. The crew sustained only minor injuries.

"Sovereign of the Seas", 1852, 258 ft, the fastest and longest ship yet built when she was launched in New York, designed and built by Donald Mackay, America's foremost clipper designer. On her maiden voyage, she sailed New York to San Francisco in 103 days. This ship achieved the fastest ever recorded speed of a sailing vessel (22 knots).

== Notable people ==
- Farrel O'Shea (born 1963), former professional windsurfer

== See also ==
- World Sailing Speed Record Council
- Speed sailing
- Transatlantic sailing record

== External links and references ==
- records on 500m on the World Sailing Speed Record Council site
- records on 1 nautical mile on the World Sailing Speed Record Council site
- L'Hydroptère record at 51,36 knots, 4 September 2009, on Youtube
- Vestas Sailrocket site
- Macquarie Innovation site
- Banque Populaire V site
- Crossbow I and II on the Dave Culp SpeedSailing site
