= Rob Douglas =

American kitesurfer

- Born: June 16, 1971 (age 55); Boston, MA, USA
- Occupation: Professional Sailor

Robert "Rob" Douglas (born 1971) is an American professional sailor known for using a kiteboard in speed sailing records attempts. In 2008 Douglas broke the world speed sailing record on a kiteboard, hitting a top speed of 49.84 knots. Douglas again became the holder of the speed record in October 2010 when he was clocked at 55.65 knots. In 2019 while competing in La Palme France Rob set another world record in kitesurfing by sailing an average speed of 39.04 kts over 1 nautical mile. In July 2026 at the Prince of Speed World Record Attempt Rob set his 8th world speed sailing record with an average speed of 42.75 on 1 nautical mile. https://www.mvtimes.com/2026/07/15/island-man-breaks-own-record-as-worlds-fastest-kitesurfer-for-one-mile/

== Biography ==
=== Early years ===
Rob Douglas was born June 16, 1971, in Boston, Massachusetts, US, to a family which operated a sailing business.

=== Speed sailing record holder ===
In 2008, Douglas became the first person to set an outright world speed sailing record aboard a kite board, hitting a speed of 49.84 nautical miles per hour. This record proved to be short-lived, however, as another kiteboarder soon broke Douglas's mark, topping the 50 knot sailing barrier for the first time. Later in 2010 Douglas set three new American speed sailing records, being clocked at top speeds of 50.95, 51.88, and 52.58 knots. Another new speed record was set by on October 28, 2010, at the Lüderitz Speed Challenge in Namibia. On that date, in perfect conditions, Douglas was one of five kiteboarders to top the previous record held by a trimaran named Hydroptère. Douglas was the fastest of the fivesome on that day, setting a new world mark of 55.65 knots (103.1 kilometres per hour). Douglas used a Cabrinha Switchblade kite and a custom speed board. Douglas's record setting prowess led to him be nominated by the International Sailing Federation for its 2011 ISAF World Sailor of the Year Awards. In 2012, Douglas won the International Kitesurfing Association Speed World Championships in Salin-de-Giraud, France. In 2016, he defended his 2012 world speed title by winning the 2017 International Kitesurfing Association (IKA) Speed World Championships in Martha's Vineyard USA. In 2018 Douglas won his third speed sailing world crown by winning all 5 races and averaging over 50 knots in Masirah Island, Oman at the IKA world championships. In 2019 Douglas set another kite speed world record (his 3 world record) by sailing an average speed of 39.04 knots over the nautical mile in La Palme, France. Racing at the Prince of Speed Kitesurfing World Championship on June 14, 2023, Mr. Douglas broke the first record traveling 40.41 knots for one nautical mile, which is equivalent to 46.4 miles per hour on land. He broke a second record the following day, surpassing his earlier speed and sailing 41.49 knots on the one nautical mile. At the 2025 Prince of Speed event in La Palme, France, Rob achieved an average speed of 42.73 knots (49.13 mph) over one nautical mile, breaking his previous record of 41.49 knots (47.7 mph) set in 2023. He also set a new U.S. record for top speed on a wingfoil at 29.43 knots (33.86 mph) and achieved a 500-meter record at 32.47 knots (37.34 mph). Additionally, he set two national records for the 500-meter distance, reaching 31.18 knots and then 32.47 knots in subsequent attempts. The Martha's Vineyard Times +3
