= YPE =

YPE may refer to:

- Peace River Airport (IATA: YPE), a municipally owned airport in Alberta, Canada
- Yellow Pages Endeavour, an Australian sailboat designed for speed sailing
- Young Pirates of Europe, a European federation of European pirate youth organisations and other youth organisations that work on digital issues
