= Jimmy Lewis (surfer) =

Hawaiian Surfer and Surfboard Shaper

Jimmy Lewis is a Hawaiian surfer, sailor and surfboard shaper.

Born in Newfoundland Canada, he moved to Maui when his father was stationed Hawaii. He still lives on Maui where he personally takes care of the research and development of his boards at his workshop on Nehe Place, in Haiku.

At the young age of 15 years he shaped his first surfboard, showing a talent that led him to develop many innovative projects from surfing, to windsurfing, to tow-surfing, to kitesurfing, then on to stand up paddle boards.

In the early 80’s Mike Waltze brought Jimmy Lewis into the limelight as the “shaper” of the moment, winning the "Aloha Classic" with one of Jimmy’s custom windsurf boards.

In 1982 the French windsurfer Pascal Maka broke the speed sailing record on a windsurf board, reaching 27.8 knots, using a board created by Jimmy Lewis specifically for the event.

In 1986, Pascal Maka was the first windsurfer to break the speed sailing record from Timothy Colman's Crossbow II, which had held the record for six years. He reached a speed of 38.86 knots using a Jimmy Lewis board and a sail manufactured by Gaastra. The same day three other athletes broke the record before him: Eric Beale (36.73 knots), Jimmy Lewis (36.31 knots) and Fred Haywood (36.13).

During the 1990s he began his collaboration with Bic and Sailboards Maui, developing models of commercial success. He also worked with Windsurfing International designing plugs for production boards, including the Windsurfer 99, among others.

Then, around 1995, with Lou Wainman, a famous pioneer of kite surfing, he developed the first bidirectional board completely innovating the sport.

In 2005 his interest in stand up paddle (SUP) began to grow, and he quickly became one of the protagonists of this new discipline shaping the first prototypes for Laird Hamilton. The Jimmy Lewis Cruise Control 11'0.7 is still in production and is the most sold stand up paddle board in the world.

The Jimmy Lewis board is built in the Kinetic factory in Vietnam, using a sandwich-structured composite. Jimmy Lewis claims that the manufacturing is done almost exactly the same way as he builds boards on Maui using the same materials and techniques and with the same care and attention to detail.

The kiter Niccolò Porcella, the SUP racer Paul Marconi, and his son (not an ASP Pro) Marlon Lewis are among his athletes using his boards.

== References and further reading ==
- Aloha Classic Maui
- Standupjournal
- sdc kiteboard
- speedsurfing
- international windsurfing association
- international funboard class association
- the kite border
- Orange bowl paddle
