= Lüderitz Speed Challenge =

Annual speed sailing event

Coordinates: 26.6870°S 15.1480°E

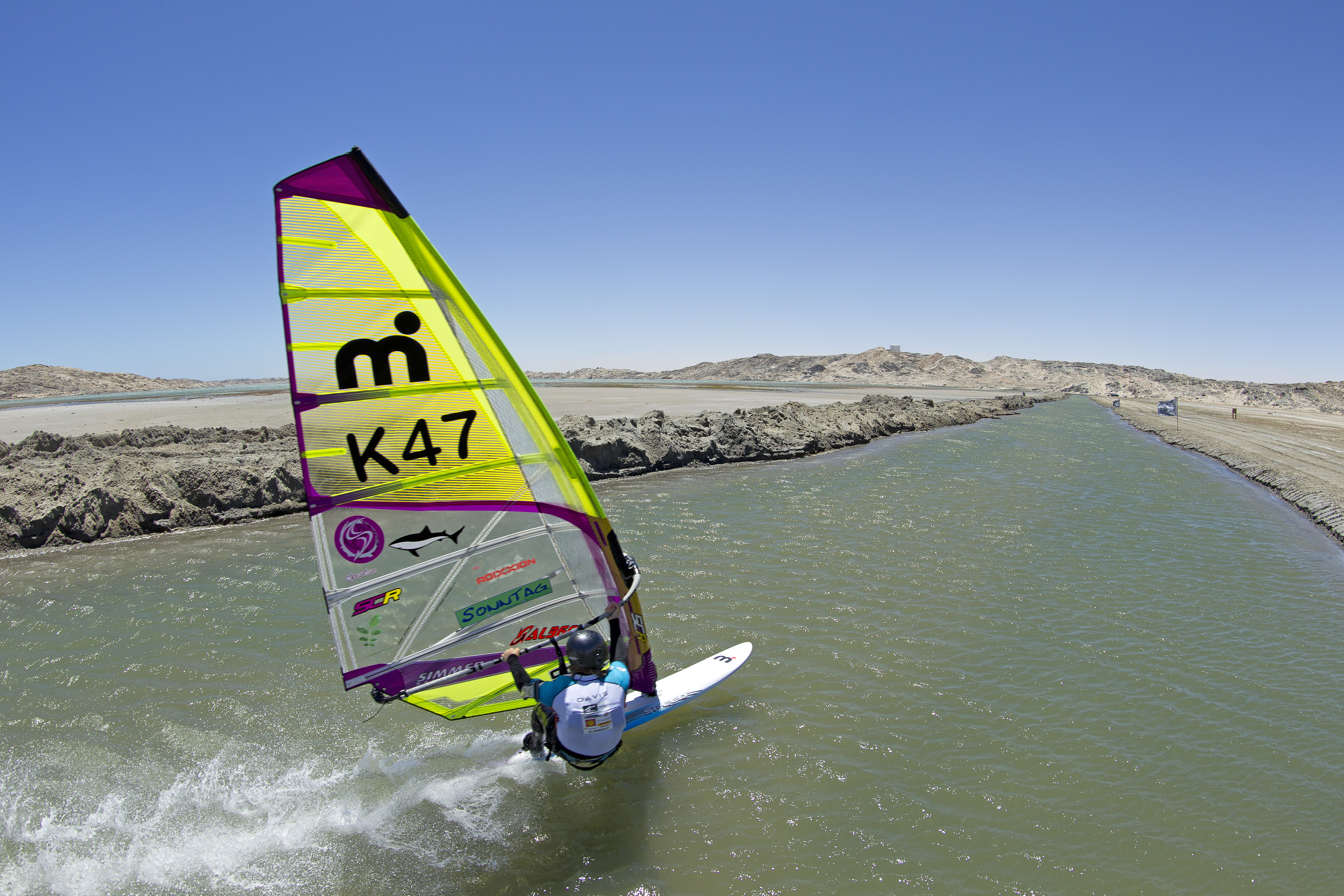
- Zara Davis at speed world record attempt on the Luderitz canal.

Tournament information
- Sport: Windsurfing
- Location: Lüderitz, Namibia
- Established: 2007
- Administrator: Surf’n’Curve of Cape Town, South Africa
- Tournament format(s): 500 m. clocked run on a 800 m. manmade canal, single contestant per run

Most recent tournament
- Lüderitz Speed Challenge 2021 (October 18 to November 28)

The Lüderitz Speed Challenge is an annual speed sailing event, held since 2007 in Lüderitz, Namibia, during the southern hemisphere spring. It is observed by the World Sailing Speed Record Council (WSSRC) and the International Sailing Federation (ISAF).

== The site ==
The event is held at the southern end of the 1 km × 7 km (0.62 mi × 4.35 mi) lagoon west of Lüderitz, where between August and March every year there is a consistent, strong wind, blowing from the south at the perfect angle of 140 degrees to the sailing course. In the first edition of the event in 2007, participants sailed over a curved course. For the second edition, in 2008, a straight course was created by digging along the shore, providing also a very uniform water depth over the entire run. Performance was further enhanced by placing sandbags upwind of the run, and by using temporary wood “chop killers” that reduce the chop caused by the Lüderitz 40 knots (74 km/h) to 50 knots (93 km/h) winds. The total course length is 800 metres (2,600 ft), including the launching and slow-down zones, before and after the 500-metre (1,600 ft) official WSSRC distance.

== Event history ==
=== 2007 ===
The first Speed Challenge event was held in 2007, in which French kitesurfer Alexandre Caizergues made the best 500-m run at 47.92 knots – only 0.78 knots (1.44 km/h) short of the then-current 48.70 knots (90.19 km/h) world record, set in 2005 on The Canal by windsurfer Finian Maynard.

=== 2008 ===
The second event saw the first ever over-50 knots (93 km/h) outright speed sailing record, when on October 3 Sebastien Cattelan made 50.26 knots (93.08 km/h), only to lose the title one day later to Alex Caizergues at 50.57 knots (93.66 km/h). This achievement marked the end of the race of the speed sailing world to cross the 50 knots (93 km/h) mark, between kitesurfers, windsurfers and sailboats, and opened the race towards the next "mythical frontier" of 100 km/h.

The women's outright speed sailing record was also broken during this event, by South African kitesurfer Sjoukje Bredenkamp, who improved her own previous world record to 45.20 knots (83.71 km/h).

Earlier in the event, on September 19, kitesurfer Rob Douglas (United States) made a 49.84 knots (92.30 km/h) run, becoming the first kitesurfer to establish an outright speed sailing world record – held until that date only by sailboats or windsurfers. Douglas also became the world's third over-50 knots (93 km/h) sailor, when on September 8 he made a 50.54-knot (93.60-km/h) run.

=== 2010 ===
Top Results for 2010 Lüderitz Speed Challenge

Speed (knots)	Speed (km/h)	Name	Nationality
55.65	103.06	Robert Douglas	USA
55.49	102.77	Sebastien Cattelan	France
54.93	101.73	Alex Caizergues	France
