= Sailing hydrofoil =

Sailboat with wing-like foils mounted under the hull

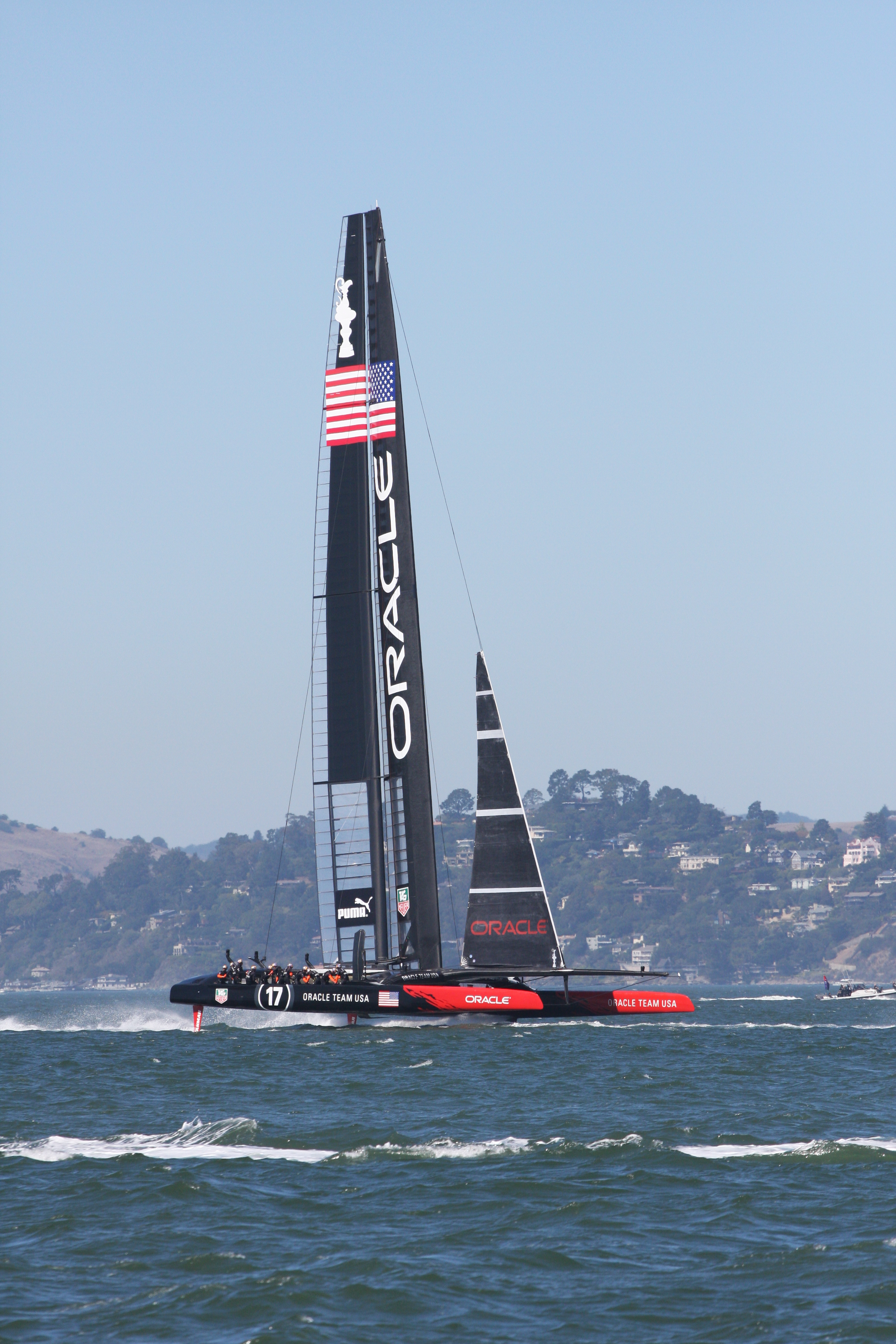
Hydrofoiling wingsail catamaran 17

A sailing hydrofoil, hydrofoil sailboat, or hydrosail is a sailboat with wing-like foils mounted under the hull. As the craft increases its speed the hydrofoils lift the hull up and out of the water, greatly reducing wetted area, resulting in decreased drag and increased speed. A sailing hydrofoil can achieve speeds exceeding double and in some cases triple the wind speed.

Both monohull and multihull sailboats can be retrofitted with hydrofoils, although greater stability can be achieved by using the wider planform of a catamaran or trimaran.

== Typical configurations ==
Some multihulls use three foils; two main forward foils provide lift so that the boat "flies" while a horizontal foil on the rudder is trimmed to drive and control altitude. On catamarans, a single main foil can be attached between the hulls just in front of the center of gravity and at 2 degrees of incidence, spanning the tunnel with supporting struts. Hydrofoil catamarans are also called foilcats.

Multihull sailboats can also employ hydrofoils only to assist performance. Just as daggerboards and rudders are foils that enhance the control of a boat, assisting hydrofoils provide lift to the hull to reduce the wetted area without actually lifting the boat completely out of the water.

Monohull boats typically employ a "ladder" arrangement of hydrofoils splayed out with a dihedral angle of 50 degrees, with a stabilizing rudder foil. One of the earliest examples is the Monitor boat from 1957. This design offers the advantages of maximum lifting foil area at slow speeds and less at higher speeds, but with some additional drag arising from the dihedral support of the outboard ladder foils.

== Types of hydrofoils ==
There are four main types of hydrofoils used in sailboats, in which each type employ similar and different advantages to each other. Overall, 'T' Foils fit into their own category of single direction lift, while 'C', 'L', and 'S' fit into a category of multidirectional lift.

=== 'T' Foils ===
'T' Foils, commonly seen in the International Moth class and the AC75 class, contains a vertical component connecting to a horizontal wing, providing lift for the foil. 'T' Foils only provide lift in the perpendicular direction from the horizontal wing component and hence are typically used only for upwards lift instead providing lift in the vertical and horizontal direction. 'T' Foils are often equipped with an adjustable trailing edge that attaches to some flight control sensor to ensure steady flight. This system was easily implemented in the Moth class.

=== 'C' Foils ===
'C' Foils also known as curved daggerboards are shaped as a constant curve and are allowed to travel up and down within its casing, changing the area of the board exposed to the water. When the board starts at its maximum height above the water, it is near vertical and employs a lifting force normal to the exposed surface or otherwise horizontal lift. As the board is pushed lower, the 'C' shape forces a larger portion of the board to become horizontal, introducing a larger vertical component in the lift. This variation in configuration allows for many boats to provide a higher upwind angle due to the horizontal lift in combination to the vertical lift. The curved boards also solve the issue of increased drag at high speed, while no longer requiring a strong horizontal lift by adjusting the exposure of the board to the water.

=== 'S' Foils ===
The 'S' Foil contains the slight shape of a 's' and operates in a similar manner to the 'C' Foils, with the reverse order of operations, such that when lowering the 'S' Foil the horizontal lifting force exerted increases due to a more vertical orientation in the board.

=== 'L' Foils ===
'L' Foils consist of a curve edge followed by a sharp 90-degree bend such that the bottom of the foil sits upright when not submerged in the water, and sits at a 45-degree angle from horizontal when submerged entirely. Similarly to the 'C' and 'S' foils, the amount that the foil is lowered changes the amount of vertical and horizontal lift being created.

== Foiling classes ==
=== Monohulls ===
==== International Moth ====
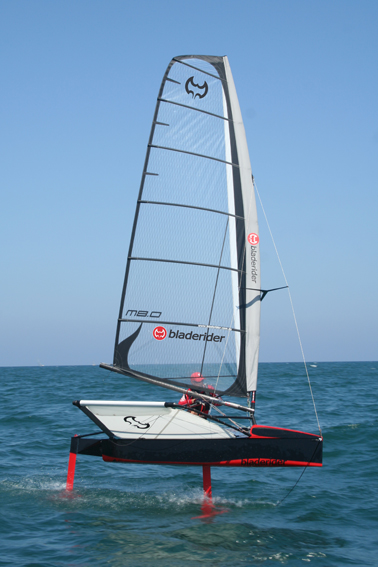
Rohan Veal sailing a Bladerider

The most widespread use of hydrofoils in sailboats to date has been in the International Moth class. Andy Paterson of Bloodaxe boats on the Isle of Wight is widely considered to have developed the first functional foiling Moth, though his boat had three foils in a tripod arrangement. Brett Burvill sailed a narrow skiff Moth with inclined surface-piercing hydrofoils to a race win at the Moth World Championships in 2001 in Australia, which was the first time a hydrofoil Moth had won a race at a World Championship. This hydrofoil configuration was later declared illegal by the class, as it was felt to constitute a multihull, which is prohibited by class rules. Initially Ian Ward in Sydney, Australia developed the first centerline foiling Moth which demonstrated that sailing on centerboard and rudder foils alone was feasible. Subsequently, Garth and John Ilett in Perth, Australia developed a two-hydrofoil system for the Moth with active flap control for the main foil via a surface sensor. John's company Fastacraft was the first to produce a commercially available hydrofoil International Moth. Fasta Craft's Prowler design, superseded in 2008 by the F-Zero, features a carbon-fiber hull, inverted "T" foils on the centerboard and rudder, and can reach speeds of over 27 knots. Fasta Craft has since been joined in producing hydrofoil Moths by several other companies, including Bladerider, Assassin, Exocet, and Aardvark Technologies.

Although initially debated fiercely within the class, the adoption of hydrofoils has proven a success for the International Moth class, with rapid fleet growth in the years since 2001. All World Championships since 2004 have been won by hydrofoil-equipped Moths, which can become foilborne in as little as six knots of breeze when steered by an experienced sailor of lighter weight. The class rule remains open to development of all boat components including hydrofoil systems, and development within the class continues to be spurred by both commercial and individual/amateur efforts.

==== Waszp ====
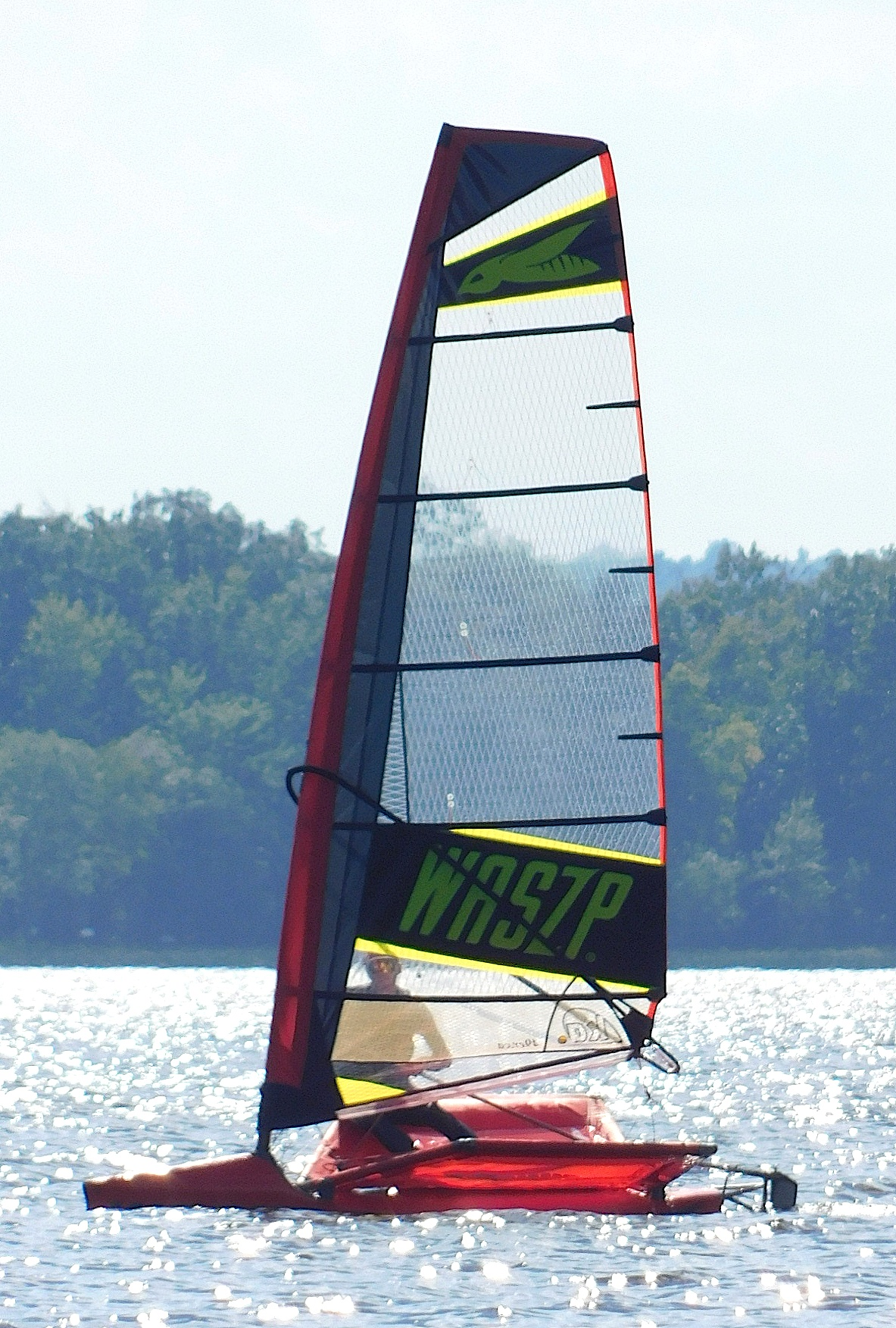
Waszp

The Waszp class founded in 2016, is almost identical to the current configuration of the International Moth class. The class contains the same "T" foils design on the centerboard and rudder, with the same narrow hull shape. The largest difference between the two classes is that the Wazsp is heavier due the foils being constructed out of aluminum instead of carbon fiber. Due to heavier design, the top speed of the waszp is only 26.7 knots, however its cheaper materials have made it a popular and accessible class, despite its relative youth. Most recently, the Waszp class has partnered with SailGP to develop a pathway for young sailors to work their way into the professional field of sailing.

==== 69F ====
The 69F also known as the Persico 69F is a 3-4 person fully carbon foiling monohull, resembling that of a skiff, designed by Wilson-Marquinez and built by Persico Marine. The newly founded one-design class had its first racing series in 2020, starting in Europe and then making its way over to the United States in 2022. The boat consists of a singular t-shaped rudder foil, two 'L' foils on each side, and a singular daggerboard in the center of the boat for stability. The 69F is 6.9 meters long and contains a fully battened main sail and jib alongside a gennaker, totaling a sail area of 69.0 meters.

==== Laser dinghy ====
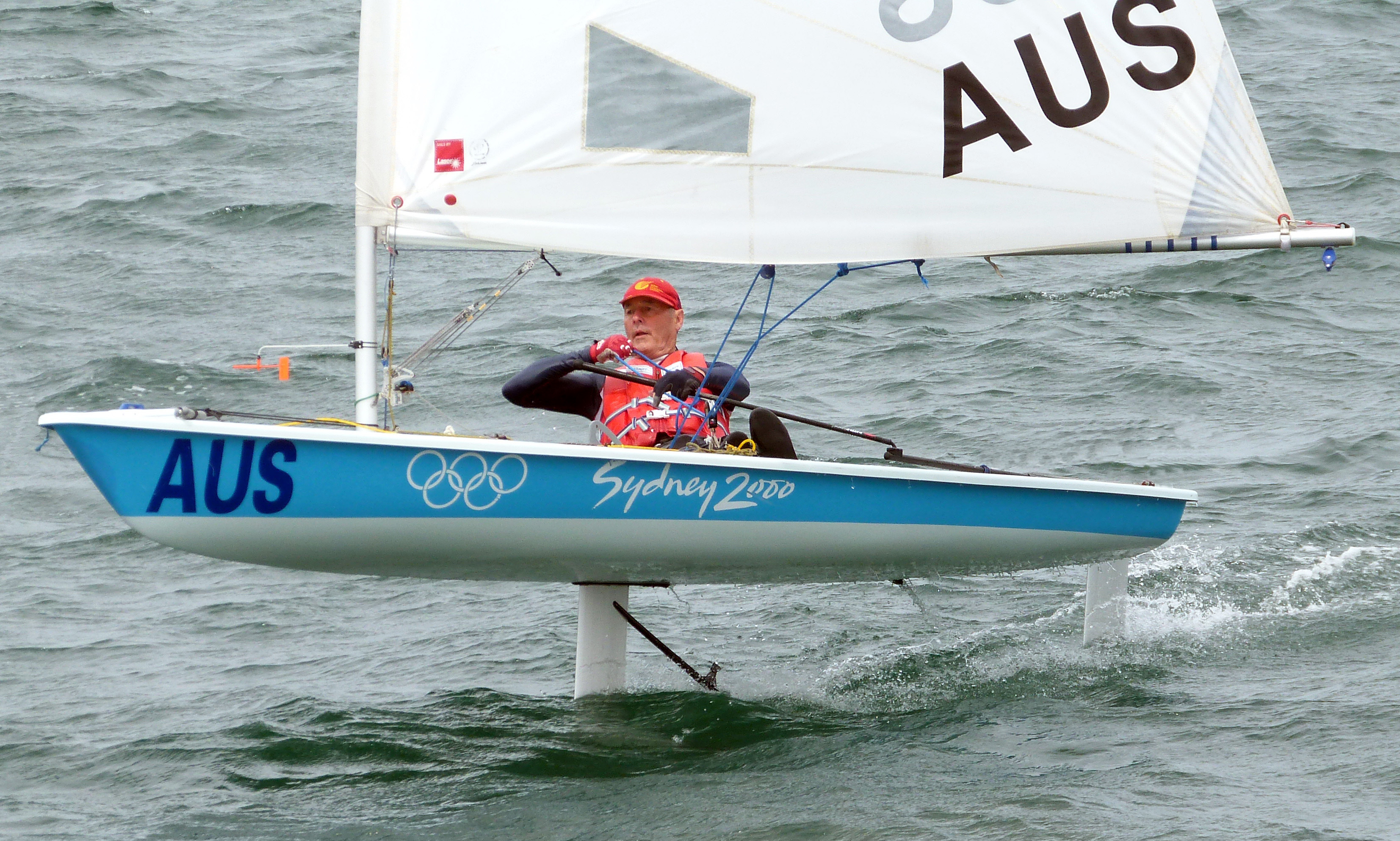
Glide Free Foils on a Laser sailing dinghy

The first time a Laser foiled was in December 2009 by Ian Ward in Sydney, Australia. Top speeds of around 23-25kts are possible with this kit. The foils can be removed and the boat remains class legal. This foiling system is unique in that it is retractable, has flapless foils and the height sensing 'wand' is integrated within the daggerboard.

==== Optimist ====
The "world's least advanced sailboat" was converted to hydrofoiling by the Chalmers University of Technology, in Sweden, in 2017.

The Optimist, only 2.3 metres in length and with a sail area of 3.3 square metres, is normally limited to speeds below 4 knots. The hydrofoils allows the optimist dinghy to achieve 12 knots in only 12 knots of wind.

==== AC75 ====
The AC75 (America's Cup 75 class) is a 75 ft sailboat class, governing the construction and operation of the yachts used in the 2021 America's Cup. The boat type is a foiling monohull with canting ballasted T-wing hydrofoils mounted on port and starboard topside longitudinal drums, a centerline T-wing rudder, and no keel. Speeds of 50 knots were predicted based on computer simulations and in fact have been exceeded in the Prada Cup by the America Magic's boat in January 2021. In October 2024, during the Louis Vuitton Cup, INEOS Britannia reached a reported 55.5 knots.

==== IQFoil ====
The IQFoil windsurfer class selected by World Sailing to be used in the Summer Olympics starting 2024.

=== Keelboat/Hybrids ===
==== IMOCA 60 ====
The IMOCA 60 class, originally a non-foiling offshore racer competing in around the globe races such as the Volvo Ocean Race and the Vendée Globe was re-designed with S-shaped daggerboard foils. The new foil designs allowed for enough lift to lift a portion of the boat out of the water, making it a partially foiling boat, reducing the overall drag and increasing the top speed of the boat. The IMOCA 60 Hugo Boss 7, skippered by British skipper Alex Thomson is one of the recent IMOCA 60 boats with semi foiling features.

==== MW40OF ====
While only in its design phase, the MW40OF is modeled after the 69F and similar to other offshore racers to be a fully foiling offshore racer equipped with C-shaped daggerboard Foils and T-shaped rudder foils and a crew of 5 people.

=== Catamarans ===
==== America's Cup catamarans ====
Foils have been used in the America's Cup since 2013.

===== GC32 =====
The GC32 is carbon fibre production hydrofoil catamaran 32 feet (9.8 meters) in length. It has a top speed of about 40 knots (74 km/h; 46 mph). They are sailed in the GC32 Racing Tour, and have replaced the Extreme 40's in the Extreme Sailing Series.

===== AC72 =====
The 2013 America's Cup featured daggerboard catamarans. Under the terms of the protocol, these daggerboards could not feature trim tabs, could not exceed the beam of the boat when raised and could not be adjusted when lowered, but a loophole exploited by three teams was to create T-shaped rudders and L-shaped daggerboards of which the leeward appendage serves as a hydrofoil on all points of sailing conditions in winds over 10 knots. On September 6, 2012, in Auckland, during Team New Zealand's fifth day of trials, their boat achieved 40 knots (74 km/h) with a level trim and no heeling in 17 knots of breeze.

===== AC45f/AC50 =====
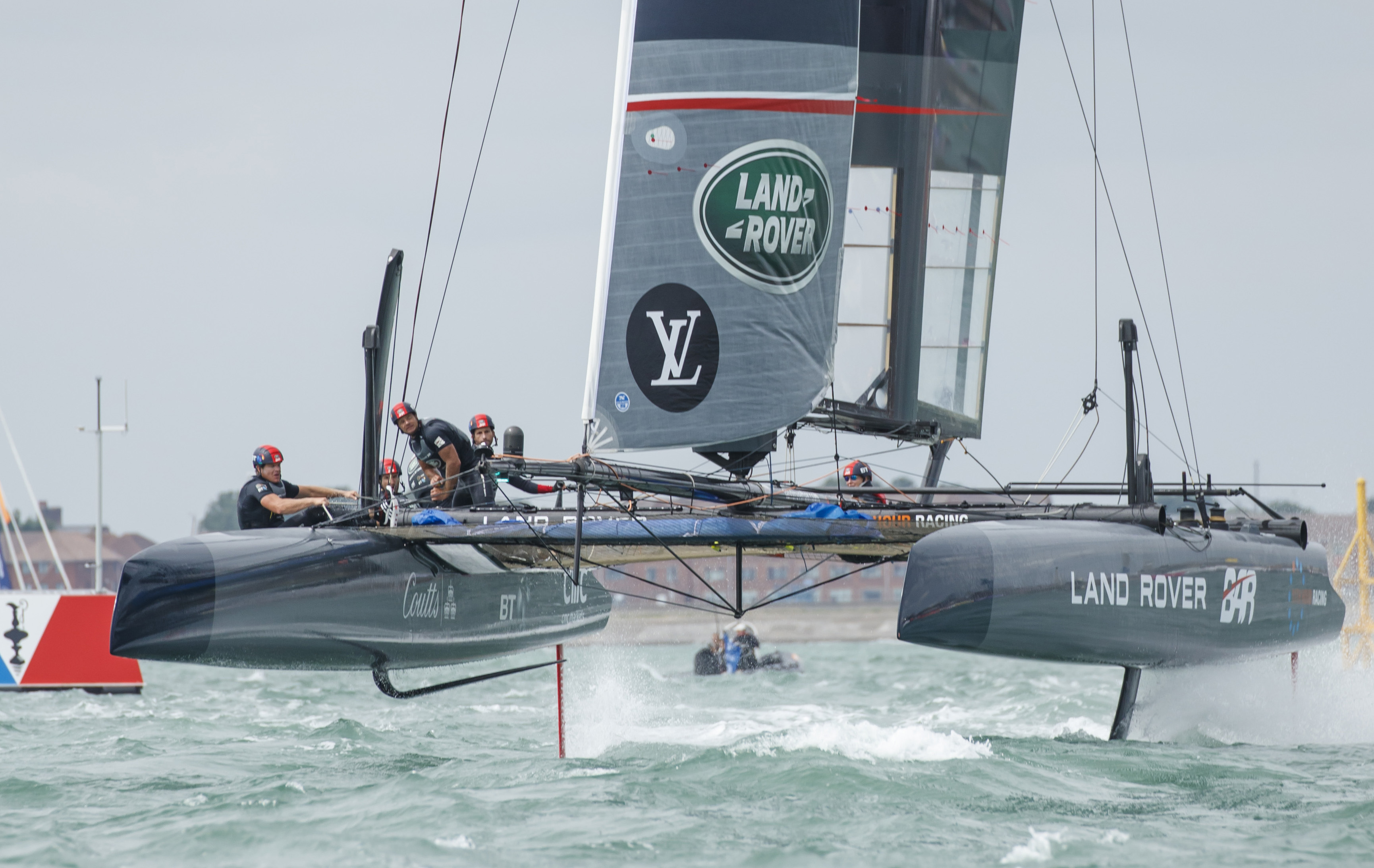
AC45f sailing on hydrofoils with one daggerboard raised above the water.

The 2015–16 America's Cup World Series was raced with hydrofoiling AC45f catamarans, which are smaller versions of the AC72.

The 2017 America's Cup was raced in the fully foiling AC50 class.

==== F50 ====
The F50 sailboat one design class is adapted from the AC50 class with modifications in new control systems, modular wingsails, and new carbon layer technologies within the foils and hull. The boat also has a variety of rudder foils, board foils, wingssails, and jibs to be used in various combination with a crew of 4-6 people based on the wind speeds. Originally equipped with 'L' Foils, the design swapped to 'T' Foils at the beginning of 2025. The class is used within the SailGP series and is the first sailboat class to break 50.0 knots (57.5 mph; 92.6 km/h) during a race. Current speed record of 54 knots was set by France SailGP Team in Saint-Tropez in 2022. There currently exists a total of 12 active boats with teams from Australia, Brazil, Canada, Denmark, France, Germany, Great Britain, Italy, New Zealand, Spain, Switzerland and United States.

==== C-Class catamarans ====
Recent International C-class catamaran have been foiling, and further development is expected.

==== A-Class catamarans ====
International A-class catamaran rule 8 initially allowed hydrofoils, but was changed to partially restrict them in 2009, in response to improving technology. The rule required "that all foils must be inserted from the top of the hull, and that there must be a minimum distance between the tips of the bottom of the boards of 75cm from the centreline". The 2014 A-Class Catamaran World Titles in Takapuna New Zealand demonstrated early foiling capabilities to the class. Now the A-Class can foil stably downwind in 6 knots and upwind in 12 knots or more. Peak speeds are reported to be about 30 knots and 2.5X wind speed. The A-Class has set the standard for 4-point foiling that many classes are now adopting.

==== Nacra 17 catamaran ====
The Nacra 17 as raced at the 2016 Olympics was capable of elevated foiling under some conditions. For the 2017 World Championships, the Nacra was upgraded to a fully foiling yacht, to be raced at the 2020 Tokyo Olympics.

==== Nacra F20 catamaran ====
The Nacra F20 is a two-person catamaran similar in design to Nacra Sailing's former 20-foot catamaran and the Nacra 17; however, every component is made of carbon, from the hull, mast, and foils. The Nacra F20 uses 'L' foil daggerboard on each hull and T-shaped rudder foils.

==== Flying Phantom ====
The Flying Phantom is a catamaran similar to the Nacra that uses 'L' foils on each hull and 'T' Foils on the rudders.

==== iFLY15 ====
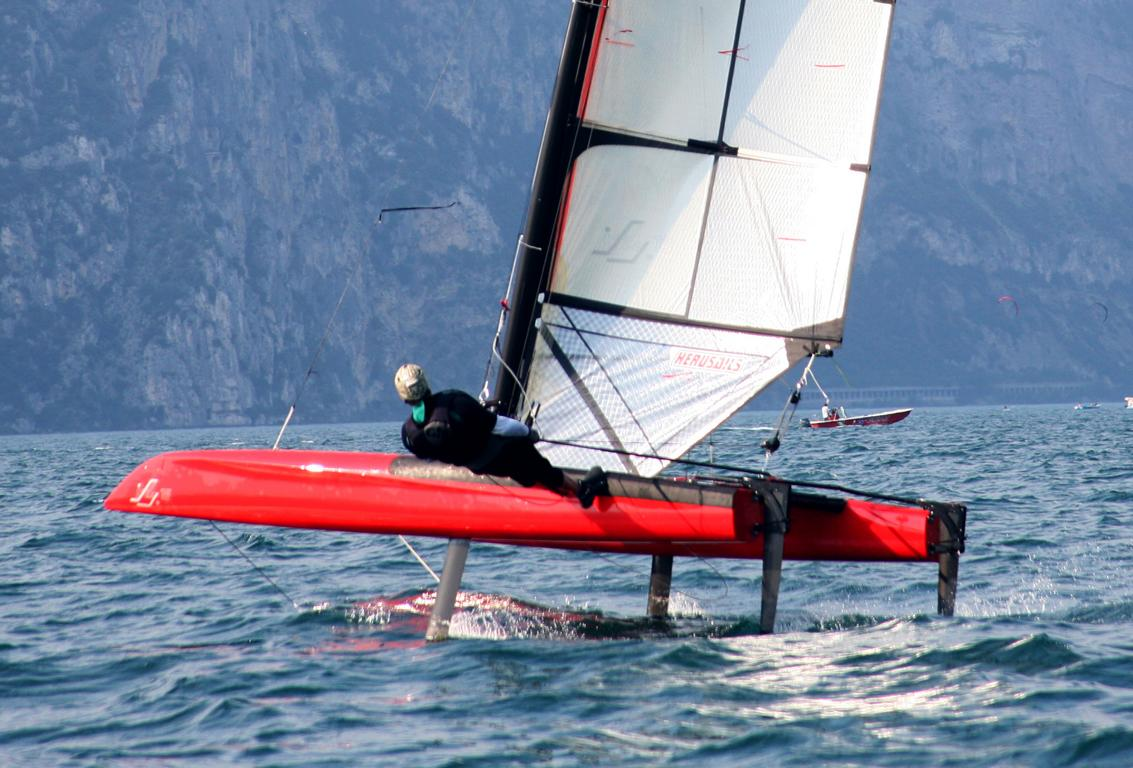
The iFlY15 sailing on its stabilized four daggerboard hydrofoils.

iFLY15 is a 15-foot hydrofoil catamaran equipped with automatic foils, built by CEC Catamarans GmbH. It uses a mechanical automatic system to stabilize the horizontal trim in the longitudinal and transverse directions. Jibes are facilitated by the four T-shaped foils which are always in the water and stabilize the boat.

==== UFO ====
Similar in design to a moth, the UFO is a small single person foiling dinghy with a T-foil daggerboard and a T-foil rudder. The boat is made out of fiberglass with carbon rigging and was meant to be user friendly, low cost boat in comparison to the moth or Waszp. Sailing the boat in subpar wind conditions proved to be easier and more enjoyable than a Waszp or Moth as the catamaran hulls provided increased stability.

==== GunBoats G4 ====
The G4 is a junior racer with cruiser content and comfort made by DNA Performance Sailing. The boat design was based on an A-Class Catamaran, containing 'L' foils on each hull and 'T' foils for the rudders and is claimed to reach a top speed of 35 knots. The G4 was designed as a hybrid between racing boats and cruising yachts, capable of foiling or not foiling based on the desires of the user. The Boat was meant to be sailed with 6 people and was capable of housing more. The G4 is no longer in production.

=== Trimarans ===
==== TriFoiler ====
In the 1990s the Hobie Cat company manufactured the TriFoiler (no longer in production), a twin-sail trimaran with a mainsail on each outrigger capable of 35+ knot speeds in typical sailing conditions, making the TriFoiler the fastest production sailboat in the world. The prototype of the Hobie TriFoiler, called Longshot, was developed by brothers Dan and Greg Ketterman in conjunction with Russell Long. Though more streamlined than the Trifoiler and having smaller hydrofoils, Longshot still holds the Class A speedsailing record of 43.55 knots on a 500-meter course, set in Tarifa Spain in 1993. Until recently, it was the only existing speedsailing record held by a hydrofoil, but the recent records of Hydroptère have added to the list with record breaking runs across the English Channel.

==== WindRider Rave ====
In 1998, WindRider LLC introduced the WindRider Rave, a popular two-person trimaran hydrofoil capable of lifting off in as little as 12-13 knots of wind. The Rave is capable of sailing between 1.5 and 2 times wind speed. The boat's mainsail has no boom. The Rave broke new ground in the development of flapped foils and control systems.

=== Other wind craft ===
==== Wind foiling ====
Windfoiling otherwise known as Windsurf Foiling are windsurf boards equipped with two T-shaped hydrofoil wings of opposite orientation connected by a fuselauge and a mast inserting into the board. The front wing is larger and provides upwards lift while the rear wing provides stability with downward lift. Many of the hydrofoils used in windfoiling can vary in size in order to obtain a greater combination of lift and top speed. A recent development in windfoiling was the creation of the IQFoil one design Olympic Windsurfing class by Starboard Windsurfing used to replace the RS:X in the 2024 Olympics. The IQFoil contains a fully battened, cambered sail alongside a board made of a carbon reflex sandwich design and a carbon and aluminum foil. The class was created in 2020 and is similar to the open windfoiling class used in the PWA (Professional Windsurfing Association) competitions.

==== Foil kitesurfing ====
The Formula Kite class was introduced into the 2024 Summer Olympics as a non-one design class. The equipment contains a singly T-shaped foil and a board. A similar setup is also used for recreational foil kitesurfing.

==== Wing foiling ====
Wing foiling is developed from Windfoiling, Foil Kitesurfing, and surfing. It uses a T-shaped foil on a small board in which a person holds an inflatable sail, small in size and similar to a kite, known as a wing.

== Experimental designs ==
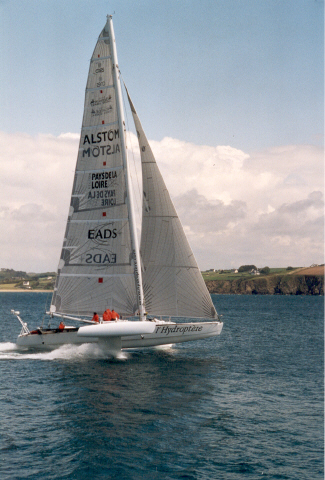
L'hydroptère experimental hydrofoil.

Non-production experimental designs have been built:

- The French experimental Hydroptère set numerous speed records. The boat attained a record speed of 47.6 knots with a goal of breaking the "50 knot barrier" in 2008. On 4 September 2009, l’Hydroptère broke the world speed sailing record, sustaining a speed of 51.36 knots for 500m.
- Vestas Sailrocket, built to capture the sailing speed record competing in the B-class for 150 to 235 square feet of sail.
- A Hobie 18 foilcat prototype called Kangalope with foil kits attached.
- Mirabaud LX is a Swiss 1.2 meter hydrofoil boat with traditional hull replaced with centerfloat, supporting spar for foil, sail and crew perch similar to moth sailing boat.
- Rich Miller's hydrofoil sailboard.

== See also ==
- Hydrofoil board
- Hydroptère
- Hobie TriFoiler
- Wing foiling
