= International Speed Windsurfing Class =

The International Speed Windsurfing Class (ISWC) is a class of speed windsurfing boards that has developed over the last 30 years in order to facilitate high performance competition in strong winds and on flat water. The International Speed Windsurfing Class is controlled by World Sailing and has been adopted as an international class in spring 2007. The class is defined as an "experimental" class, which means that the class rules give a wide possibility for the development of new equipment, also outside commonly used technologies. Speed windsurfing events are normally held on "flat water" as opposed to coastal surf; which means side-offshore wind directions with a strength of at least 20 knots (10 m/s). The ISWC speed world champion is established throughout a tour, the Speed World Cup.

== Records ==
Antoine Albeau is the current record holder with a speed of 52.02 kn (27 m/s; 96 km/h; 60 mph) over a 500 m course at Luderitz Speed Challenge (Namibia) on 13 November 2012.

The previous record holder is Finian Maynard having reached an average speed of 48.70 kn (25 m/s; 90 km/h; 56 mph) over the same distance at the same location, on 10 April 2005. This exceeded his previous record of 46.82 kn (24 m/s; 87 km/h; 54 mph) set on 13 November 2004 at the same venue.

- Updated List of Speed Sailing Records, Speed All Time Ranking
- Boards Magazine Speed-Sailing History
- Complete Chronology of Speed Sailing Records

== Record Spots and Event Sites ==
Speed Windsurfing events are normally held at venues with reliable, strong offshore winds and flat water. In opposite to the venues for record attempts, accessibility is important as well as a not to difficult course to allow for proper race organization. For world record attempts, venues are chosen only by the best wind and water characteristics.

- Sotavento Beach, Fuerteventura, Spain
- Walvis Bay, Namibia
- Luderitz, Namibia

== Prominent Competitors ==
Björn Dunkerbeck, 2005 World Champion

Finian Maynard, 2006 World Champion
