= Guy Cribb =

Personal information
- Nickname: K-9 / Cribby
- Nationality: English
- Height: 180 cm (5 ft 11 in)
- Weight: 82 kg (181 lb)
- Website: http://www.guycribb.com

Sport
- Country: UK
- Sport: Windsurfing

Guy Cribb (born 1970) is a windsurfer and windsurfing trainer.

== Career ==
Cribb is a former professional windsurfer and British racing coach and creator of the INtuition brand of technique coaching. He has been a technique and travel writer with regular features in the windsurfing press since 1990.

In 2010, he authored and produced the INtuition Gybing and Core Skills DVD. Cribb has also been involved as a R&D team member for leading industry brands between 1992 and 1999.

== Events ==
In October 2008 Guy and Antoine Albeau successfully completed a cross channel windsurf from Cherbourg, France to Sandbanks, Poole. A crossing of 75 nautical miles (138 kilometres) taking just over 6 hours.

== Sponsors ==
- JP Neil Pryde
- holidayextras
- Adidas
- Animal
- Pol Roger

== Awards ==
- 13 x UK Champion Titles
- 5 x Vice World Champion
