= Paul Larsen =

Australian sailor (born 1970)

Paul Larsen (born 16 January 1970) is an Australian sailor who has been involved in many extreme sailing projects. He led the 10-year project for the Vestas Sailrocket, which set new nautical mile and 500m world speed sailing records in 2012. He credits Pete Goss as the person who had the greatest impact on his sailing career, and his sailing hero.

Paul Larsen was part of Tim Jarvis's six-man crew that in 2013 successfully recreated Ernest Shackleton's famous journey from Elephant Island to South Georgia in the James Caird, a 22.5-foot lifeboat. Larsen successfully navigated the replica vessel, the Alexandra Shackleton, from Elephant Island to South Georgia using the same navigational instruments and methods that Frank Worsley, Shackleton's navigator on the James Caird, would have used. Additionally, after arriving at South Georgia, Larsen, along with Baz Gray, was part of Jarvis's three-man team that traversed the glaciers of South Georgia from King Haakon Bay to the now-abandoned whaling station of Grytviken, thus completing the replica journey undertaken by Shackelton and his men in 1916.
