= The Canal =

Man-made canal

Coordinates: 43.460972°N 4.464355°E

The Saintes Maries de la Mer Speed Canal, known to windsurfers as The Canal, is a man-made canal or trench near the French Mediterranean coastal town Saintes Maries de la Mer, built especially for speed record-breaking sailing by windsurfers.

== Background ==
The Canal, also called "The French Trench" by the English-speaking community of windsurfers, is 1,100 meters (3,600 ft) long and 30 meters (98 ft) wide, in a west-northwest/east-southeast orientation designed to take advantage of the Marin and Mistral winds that blow in that location.

In 1987, the idea of building a speed canal was thought up by British speed windsurfer Erik Beale and St Marie speed week organizer Michel Roussolet. The first version was 850 m long and it enabled Beale on 13 November 1988 to become the first sailor in history to officially break the 40-knot barrier, setting the Outright Speed Sailing Record of:

- 40.48 knots by British windsurfer Erik Beale in 1988.

Early in the 1990s, the canal was extended to its final length of 1,100 m, and windsurfers in 1990, 1991, and 1993 set four consecutive Outright Speed Sailing Records on The Canal, measured over a 500-meter course:

- 42.91 by French windsurfer Pascal Maka in 1990
- 43.06 by French windsurfer Thierry Bielak in 1991
- 44.66 by French windsurfer Thierry Bielak in 1991
- 45.34 by French windsurfer Thierry Bielak in 1993

Later the same year (1993), The Outright record fell to the Australian sail craft Yellow Pages at * 46.62 knots sailing in the sheltered waters of sandy point, Australia ending the 7-year reign of the windsurfers. That record would stand for 11 years until the next onslaught of the windsurfers in the early 2000s:

Three consecutive Outright Speed Sailing Records, measured on a 500-metre course, were set on The Canal by windsurfers in 2004, 2005 and 2008:

- 49.09 knots (90.91 km/h - 56.49 mph) by French windsurfer Antoine Albeau, in March 2008.
- The previous two records were held by the Irish-born windsurfer Finian Maynard, who competes for the British Virgin Islands, also on The Canal:
  - A 48.70 knots record set on 10 April 2005,
  - A 46.82 knots record (24.08 m/s or 53.88 mph) set on 13 November 2004.

In October 2008, The Canal's leading position on the world sailing map was taken by the Lüderitz Speed Challenge in Namibia, when the "holy grail" 50-knot barrier of speed sailing was first broken by a kitesurfer.

== See also ==
- Speed sailing
- Lüderitz Speed Challenge
