= Operation Apricot =

- Part of the Pacific War
- Location: Central Celebes, Dutch East Indies
- Objective: Ascertain Operation Lions' whereabouts
- Date: 5–31 January 1945
- Casualties: 1 captured

On 5 January 1945, a party of five Indonesians left Darwin to ascertain the fate of Operation Lion. On 14 January, the Dutch submarine K XV lands the party at the coast of the Djiko Doped Bay, north east Minahassa. The leader was captured; the remainder were evacuated by Catalina flying boat on 31 January.

== Bibliography ==
- National Archives Australia – [SRD (Services Reconnaissance Department) HQ] NEI [Netherlands East Indies] Section IASD [Inter-Allied Services Department].
