= Pascal Maka =

French windsurfer

Pascal Maka is a French windsurfer, who broke the outright speed sailing record in 1986, and again in 1990.

Maka broke the outright speed sailing record in 1986, at Sotavento, Fuerteventura, with a speed of 38.86 knots, using a Jimmy Lewis board and a Gaastra sail. This was the first time a windsurfer had broken the outright speed sailing record, which had previously been held by multihulls.

His record was surpassed in 1988 by British windsurfer Erik Beale, who became the first sailor to break 40 knots Saintes Maries de la Mer Speed Canal with a speed of 40.48 knots. This record lasted until 1990, when Maka again broke the record, this time also at Saintes Maries, with a speed of 43.06 knots.
