= Zara Davis =

English windsurfer (born 1966)

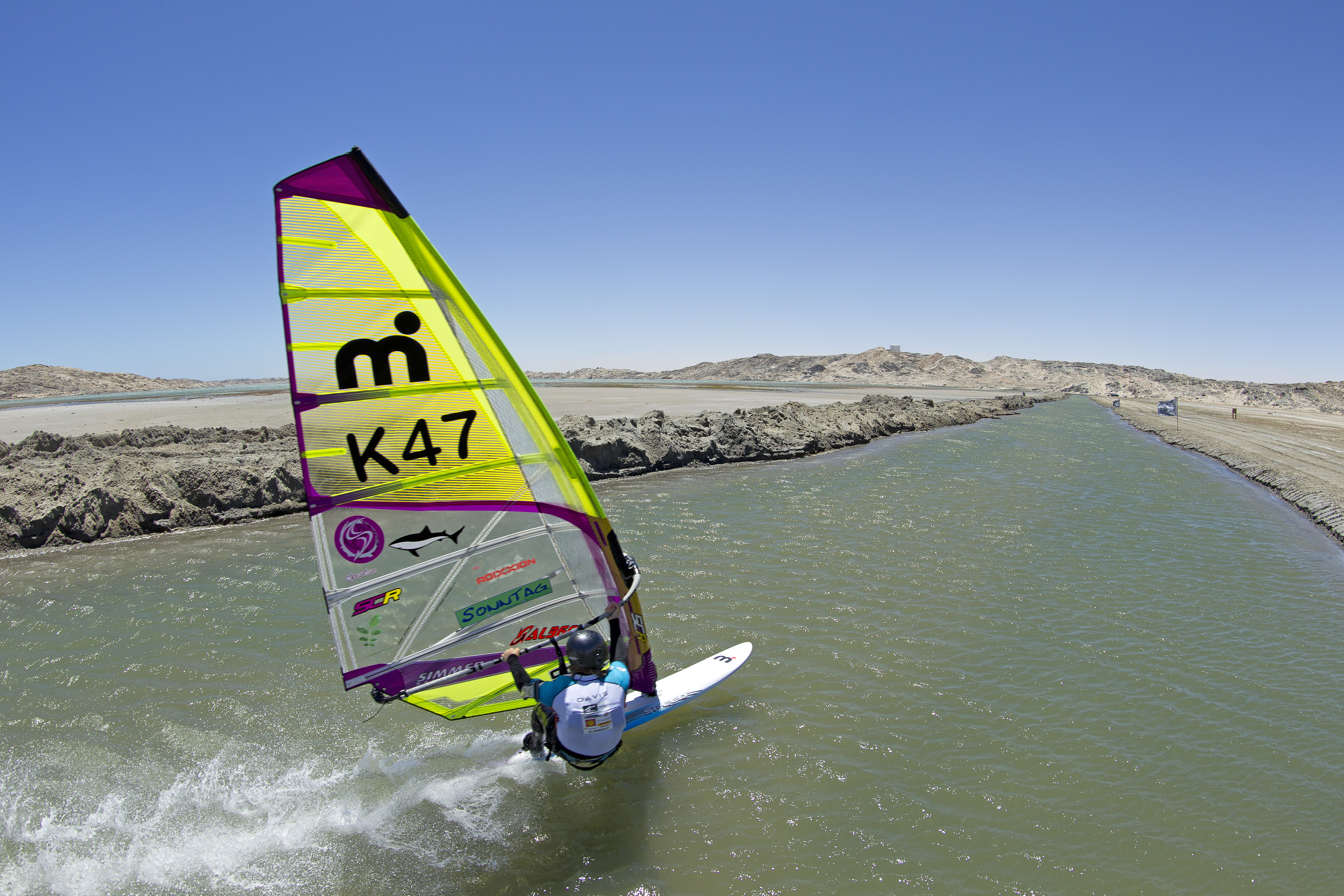
Zara Davis at speed world record attempt. Luderitz, Namibia.

Zara Davis (born 13 July 1966 in Bristol, England) is an English windsurfer. She holds the outright World Women's Nautical Mile speed record for a sailing vessel. The record was achieved in Namibia in 2006 and ratified by the World Sailing Speed Record Council. She has since improved this record for the Nautical Mile to 37.29 knots at La Plame in the South of France. Ratified by the World Sailing Speed Record Council.

She also held the Windsurfing World Women's 500m record. Set in Luderitz, Namibia in November 2012 held it for 3 years and regained it again in 2017 with a speed of 46.49 knots over the 500m course. It has been ratified by the World Sailing Speed Record Council.

Zara has won the ISWC European speed championships 6 times and the ISWC Speed World Championship 3 times, she is also ranked No1 in the world by the ISWC International Speed Windsurfing Class.

Started windsurfing when she was 13 taught by her father John and started competing at British national level in 1999–2001 winning the British UKWA Women's Slalom Title in 2000.

She turned her focus to speed windsurfing in 2004. Taking the Women's overall title at Weymouth Speed Week, 2004, 2005, 2006, 2008, 2009, 2010, 2011 and 2012. She also holds the ladies Portland harbour record at 32.44 knots.

2005 Finished 6th in the world overall on the Speed World Cup Tour and PWA slalom.

Zara is 183 cm (6 ft) tall and weighs 75 kg this is accepted as a great build for a female speed sailor, giving her the strength and leverage to achieve high speeds. She is the 1st person to hold two official speed sailing records. The first was set In October 2006 she established a new women's speed world record for sailing vessels over a Nautical mile by averaging 34.7 knots at Walvis Bay Namibia, surpassing the previous speed record set in 2005 at the same spot by French sailor Valerie Ghibaudo by over a knot. In October 2012 she went on to set the Women's Windsurfing world record 500m record at 45.83 knots which had stood for over 9 years previously held by Karin Jaggi of Switzerland at 41.25 knots. In 2015 Karin Jaggi broke the record again with 46.31 knots. Zara then went back to Luderitz in 2017 and took her record back, taking the Women's Windsurfing World record to 46.49 knots. All records were acknowledged by the World Sailing Speed Record Council.

Zara achieved No 1 status for the 1st time on the official ISWC Women's world ranking in 2010.

She also achieved a new Women's Production Board Speed Record in Luderitz Namibia at the same time as her world 500m record as she was using a standard production Simmer Speed Demon 40.
