= Proa =

Type of multihull sailboat

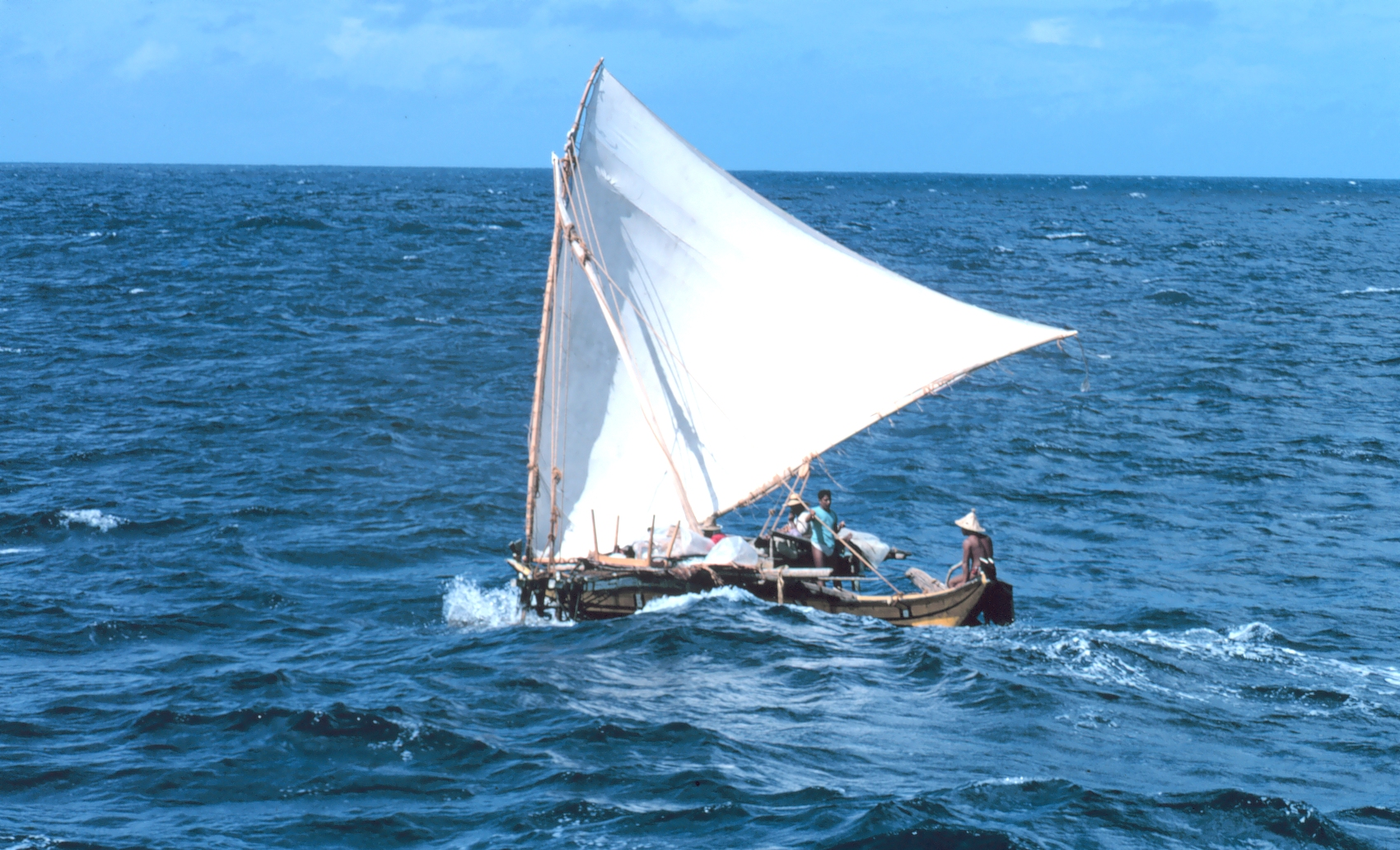
A Carolinian wa in Pohnpei with a single outrigger typical of Pacific proas

Shunting manoeuvre on a Pacific single-outrigger proa

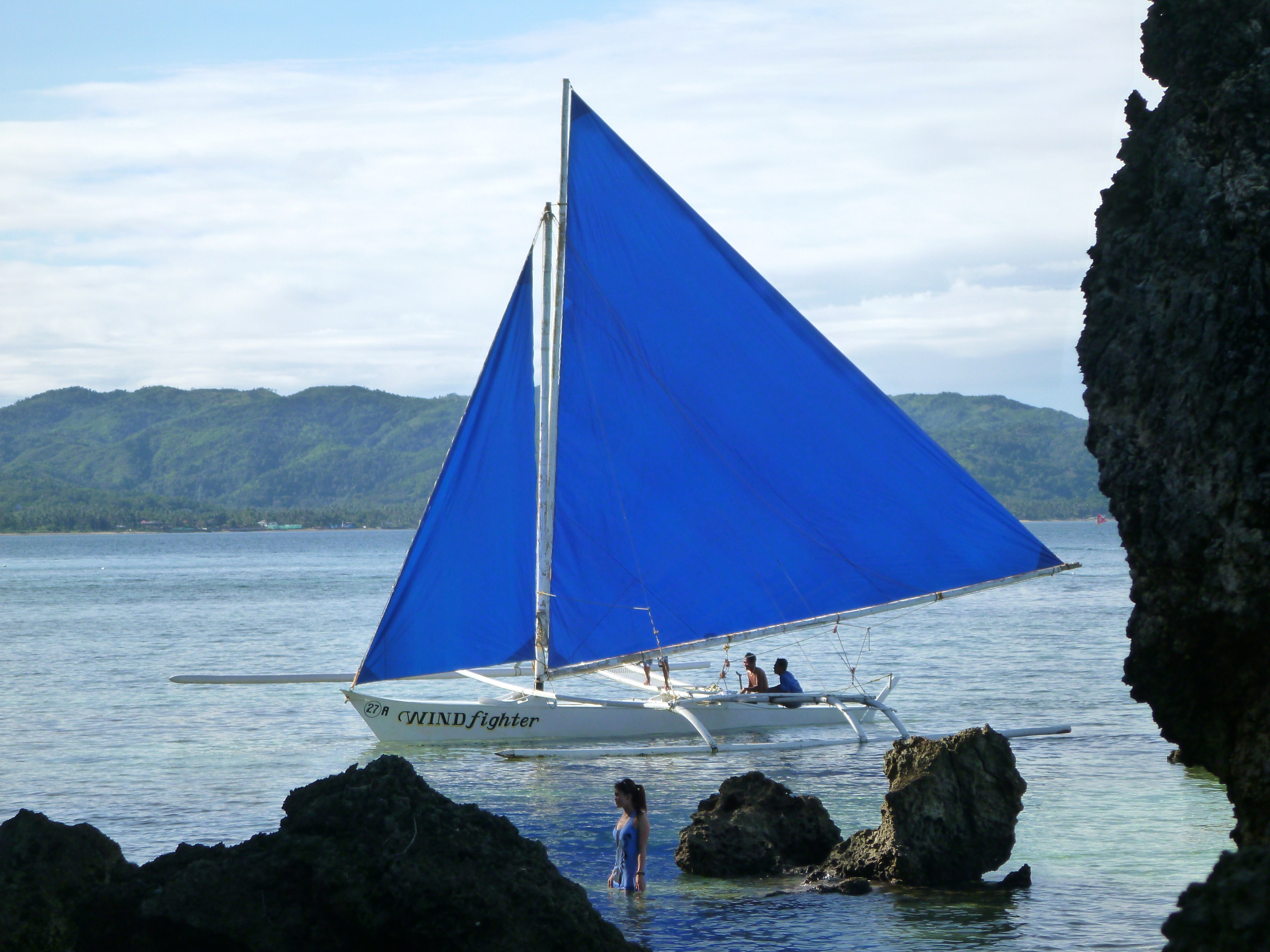
A paraw in Boracay, Philippines, with the double-outriggers typical of Southeast Asian proas

Proas are various types of multi-hull outrigger sailboats of the Austronesian peoples. The terms were used for native Austronesian ships in European records during the Colonial era indiscriminately, and thus can confusingly refer to the double-ended single-outrigger boats of Oceania, the double-outrigger boats of Island Southeast Asia, and sometimes ships with no outriggers or sails at all.

In its most common usage, the term proa refers to the Pacific proas, which consist of two (usually) unequal-length parallel hulls. It is sailed so that one hull is kept to windward, and the other to leeward. It is double-ended, since it needs to "shunt" to reverse direction when tacking. It is most famously used for the sakman ships of the Chamorro people of the Northern Marianas, which were known as the "flying proas" for their remarkable speed.

In Island Southeast Asia, the term proa may also sometimes be used, but the terms perahu, prau, prahu, paraw and prow are more common. These differ from the Pacific proas in that they are not double-ended and have a trimaran configuration with two outriggers. These are widely used in the native ships of Indonesia, Malaysia, and the Philippines, and continue to be used today as traditional fishing, cargo, and transport vessels.

Proas are traditionally rigged with the crab claw or tanja sails. The modern proa exists in a wide variety of forms, from the traditional archetype still common in areas described, to high-technology interpretations specifically designed for breaking speed-sailing records.

== Etymology ==
The term "proa" originates from Early Modern English "prow" or "praw". It probably entered the English language via Dutch prauw and Portuguese parau, similar to Spanish proa, meaning "bow". It is likely ultimately derived from Malay perahu meaning "boat", from the Proto-Western-Malayo-Polynesian doublets *parahu and *padaw (the former derived from Proto-Malayo-Polynesian *paraqu), both meaning "sailboat". Its cognates in other Austronesian languages include Javanese prau, Sundanese parahu, Kadazan padau, Maranao padaw, Cebuano and Tagalog paráw, Ngadha barau, Kiribati baurua, Samoan folau, Hawaiian halau, and Māori wharau.

== History ==
Map showing the migration and expansion of the Austronesians

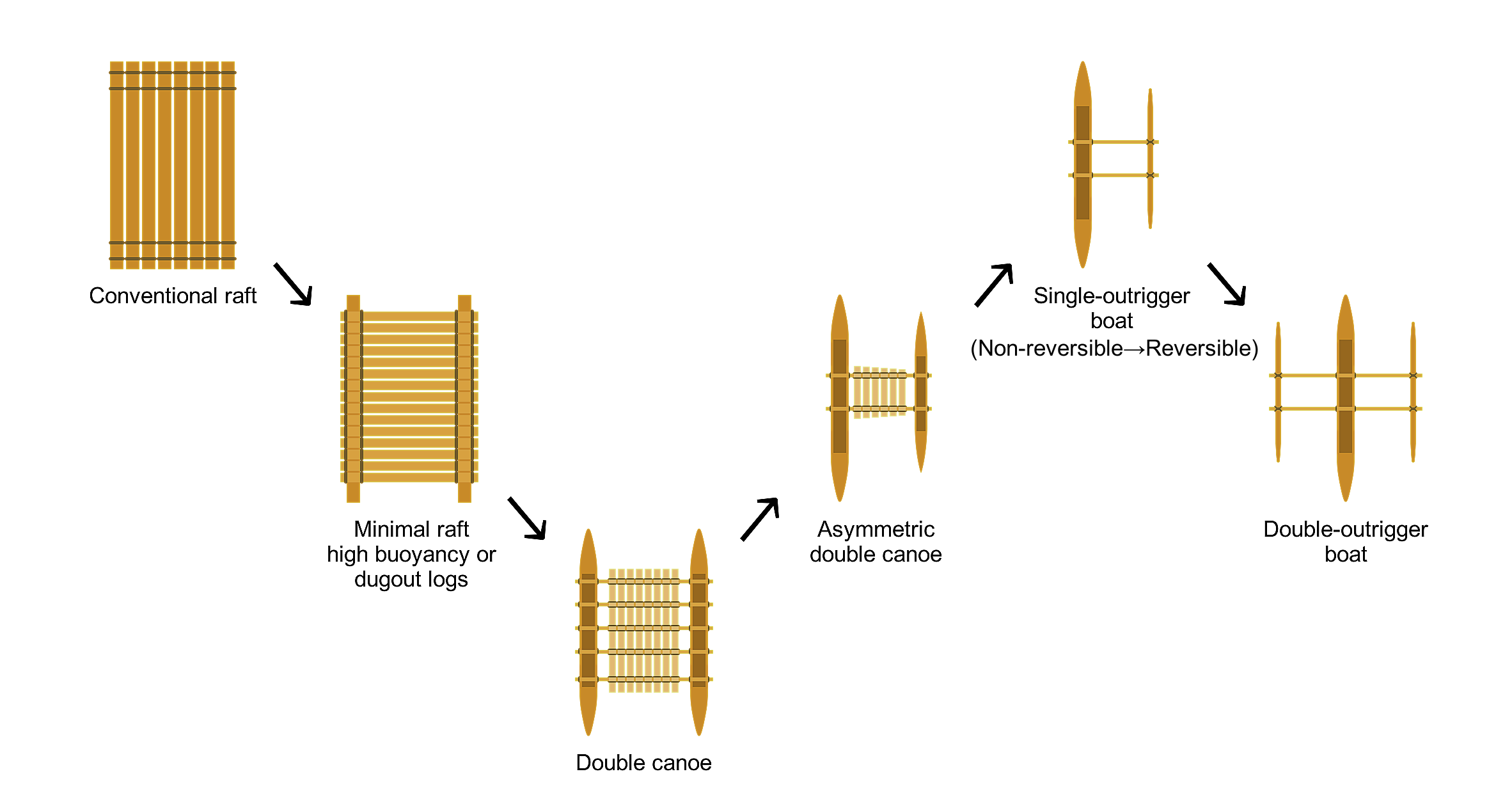
Succession of forms in the development of the Austronesian boat (Mahdi, 1999)

Catamarans and outrigger boats were very early innovations of the Austronesian peoples and were the first true ocean-going ships capable of crossing vast distances of water. This enabled the Austronesian peoples to rapidly spread from Taiwan and colonise the islands of both the Pacific and Indian oceans since at least 2200 BC. The first outriggers evolved from the more primitive double-hulled catamarans. There are two types of outrigger ships based on the number of outriggers: the single-outriggers (which include catamarans with unequal hulls) and the double-outriggers (sometimes called trimarans). Single-outriggers evolved first and are the dominant form of Austronesians ships in Oceania and Madagascar. They have largely been replaced by the more versatile double-outrigger ships in Island Southeast Asia. Double-outrigger forms, however, are absent entirely in Oceania.

Catamaran and outrigger technologies were introduced by Austronesian traders from Southeast Asia to the Dravidian-speaking peoples of Sri Lanka and Southern India as early as 1000 to 600 BC. This is still evident in the terms for "boat" in Tamil, Telugu, and Kannada (paṭavu, paḍava, and paḍahu, respectively), which are all cognates of Proto-Western-Malayo-Polynesian *padaw. Early contact by Austronesians with Arab sailors may have also influenced the development of the lateen sail in western ship traditions, derived from the more ancient Austronesian crab claw sail.

Many of these traditional vessels are now extinct. Either lost during the colonial period or supplanted in modern times by western boat designs or fitted with motor engines.

== Historical descriptions of the proa ==
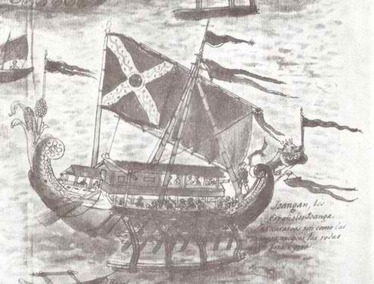
An illustration of a Spanish-built joangan in Francisco Ignacio Alcina's Historia de las islas e indios de Bisayas (1668)

The Portuguese were the first Europeans to encounter the double-outrigger Southeast Asian ships, initially with derivative vessels from the Malabar Coast, which they called the parau. They applied the same name to similar ships in their colonies in Southeast Asia. Similarly, the Dutch encountered them when they colonised the islands of Indonesia, calling them prauw. This was rendered as "praw" by the British, later evolving to "proa". In French territories in the Pacific Islands, they were known by the more general term pirogue. Although technically restricted to outrigger sailing vessels, European sources often applied the term indiscriminately to any native ships of Southeast Asia.

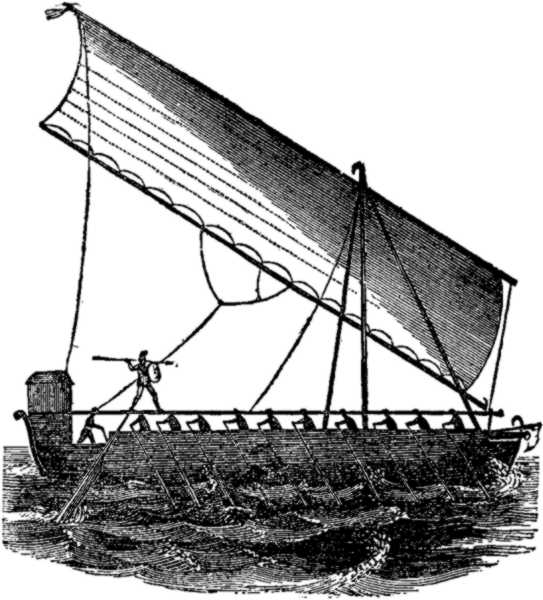
A "piratical proa in full chase" in The Pirates Own Book (1837) by Charles Elims. Note the tanja sail and the absence of outriggers.

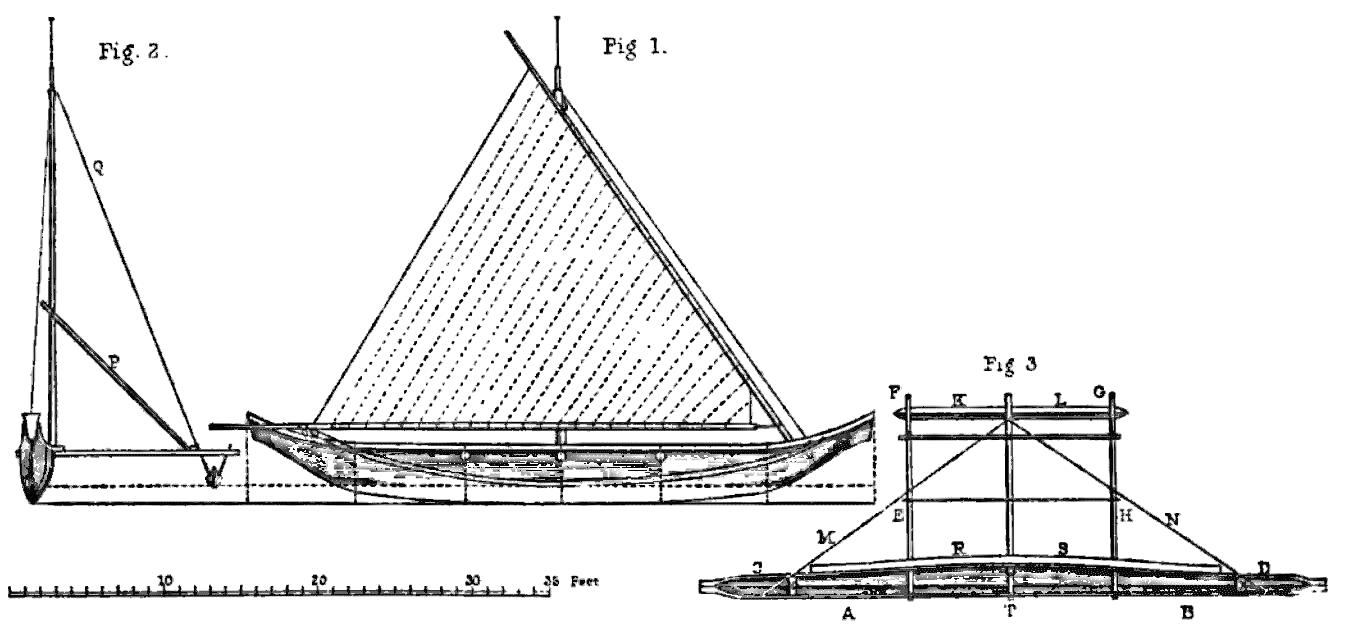
Plan of a Micronesian "flying proa", from a 1742 sketch by Lt. Peircy Brett, an officer on Lord Anson's round-the-world voyage

The earliest written accounts of the single-outrigger Pacific proa (though not by name) were by the Venetian scholar Antonio Pigafetta, who was part of Ferdinand Magellan's 1519–1522 circumnavigation. They encountered the native sakman ships of the Chamorro people in the Islas de los Ladrones (Mariana Islands). Pigafetta describes the outrigger layout of the sakman, and ability to switch bow for stern, and also notes its speed and manoeuvrability, noting, "And although the ships were under full sail, they passed between them and the small boats (fastened astern), very adroitly in those small boats of theirs." Pigafetta likened the sakman to the Venetian fisolere, a narrow variety of gondola.

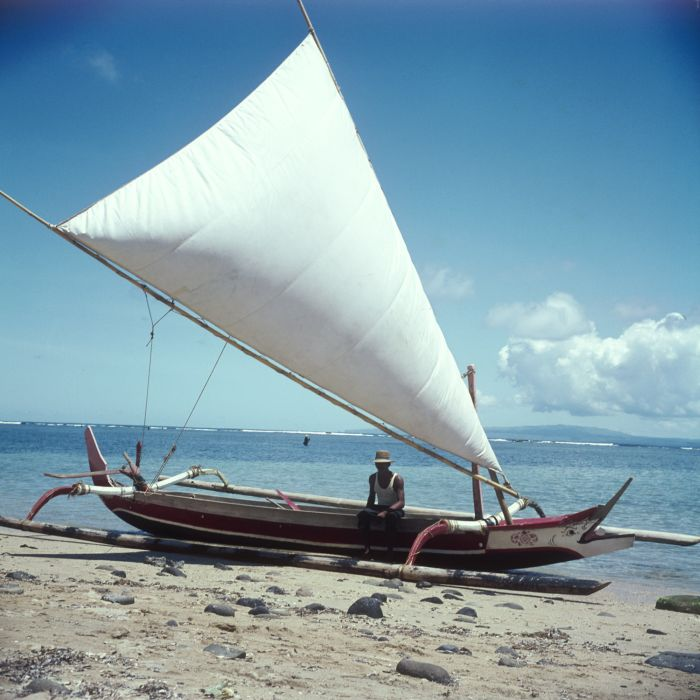
A double-outrigger Indonesian jukung (c. 1970) with a crab claw sail. These were known by the Dutch as vlerkprauw (literally "wing prauw). It is one of the vessels known as "proas" in Island Southeast Asia

The accounts of Magellan's crew were the first to describe the Chamorro proas as "flying". The subsequent colonisation of the Micronesia and the Philippines provided further references to proas in Spanish records. They also described double-outrigger ships from the Philippines, like the account of the karakoa in Francisco Ignacio Alcina's Historia de las islas e indios de Bisayas (1668) which describes them as "sailing like birds."

During his 1740–1744 circumnavigation, Lord Anson applied the term proa to the double-ended Micronesian single-outrigger ships. His fleet captured one in 1742, and Lt. Peircy Brett of HMS Centurion made a detailed sketch of the proa. Rev. Richard Walter, chaplain of Centurion, estimated the speed of the proa at 32 km/h (20 mph). Although aware of earlier Spanish accounts of the boats of the Spanish East Indies, Anson's account was the first detailed description of a Pacific proa to the English-speaking world. In the subsequent voyages of James Cook in Polynesia, he referred to the similar native single-outrigger canoes there as "proes", differentiating them from the double-hulled catamarans which he called "pahee" (Tahitian pahi).

These accounts fascinated both the British and American public, ushering in a period of interest in the design by sports sailors. Working from the drawings and descriptions of explorers, western builders often took liberties with the traditional designs, merging their interpretation of native designs with Western boat building methods. Thus this Western "proa" often diverged radically from the traditional "proa" to the point that the only shared feature was the windward/leeward hull arrangement.

The Proa darted like a shooting star
Lord Byron, "The Island", 1823

== Modern variations ==
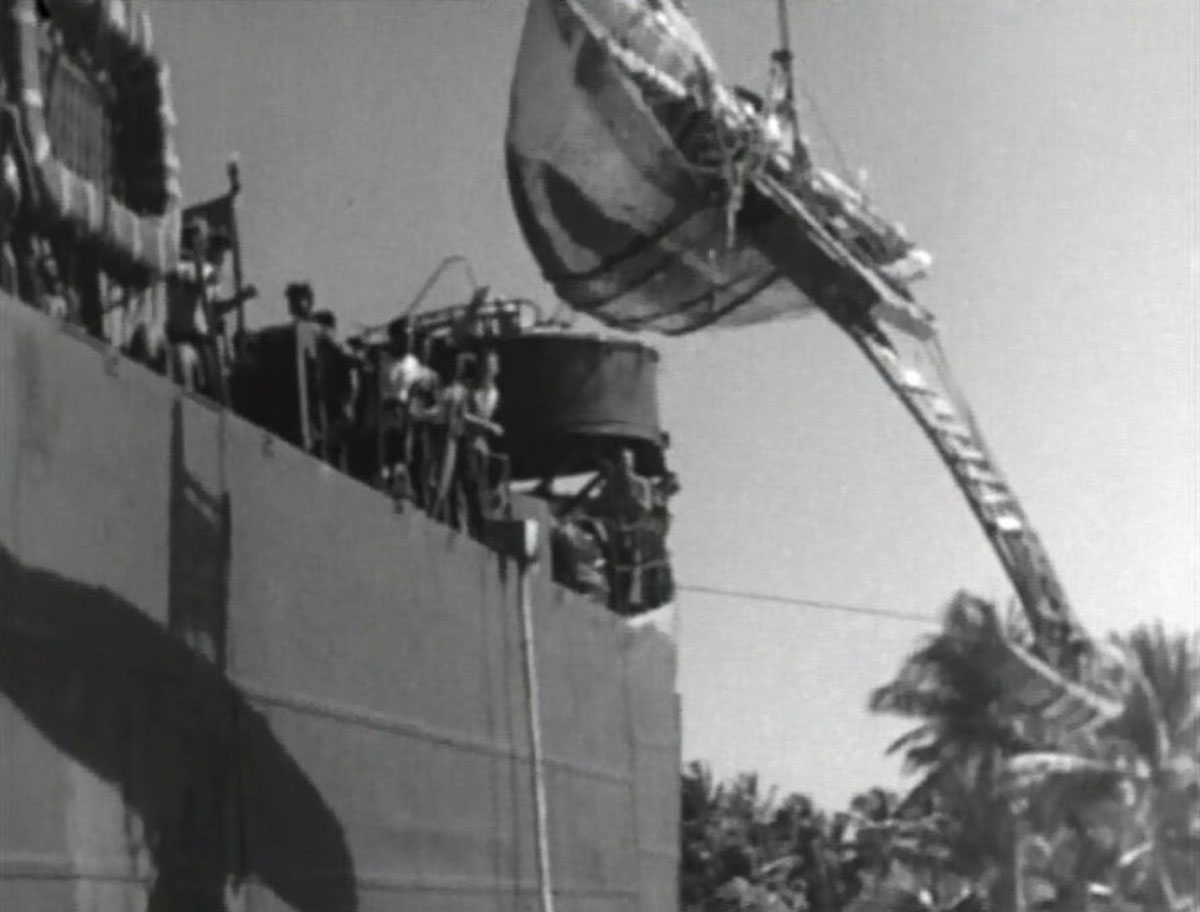
A proa of the Bikini Islanders is loaded aboard LST 1108 on March 7, 1948, as the island's residents are relocated to Rongerik Atoll.

In the Marshall Islands, where the craft were traditionally built, there has been a resurgence of interest in the proa. People hold annual kor-kor races in the lagoon at Majuro, along with events such as a children's riwut race. The kor-kors are built in traditional style out of traditional materials, though the sails are made with modern materials (often inexpensive polyethylene tarpaulins, commonly known as polytarp).

A loose group of individuals from all over the world has formed from those interested in the proa, including people with a historical perspective and those with a scientific and engineering perspective. Many such individuals are members of the Amateur Yacht Research Society.

== Early Western proas ==
Sailing is no name for it – flying is better. Out into the bay she skipped, boys yelling with delight on the uplifted outrigger, spray from the lee bow and steering oar riven into vapor by the speed blowing to leeward.

— R. M. Munroe, "A Flying Proa", The Rudder, June 1898

In the late 19th century and early 20th century, many in Europe and America became interested in the proa. Western boat builders such as R. M. Munroe and Robert Barnwell Roosevelt (Theodore Roosevelt's uncle) reflected its influence. Into the 20th century, the proa was one of the fastest sailing craft that existed. The proa design is still the basis for many boats involved in speed sailing.

The first well-documented Western version of the proa was built in 1898 by Commodore Ralph Middleton Munroe of the Biscayne Bay Yacht Club. Yacht-design giant Nathanael Herreshoff, a friend of Munroe, may have also had an interest in the project. A small model of the Anson-Brett proa is collected at the Herreshoff Marine Museum in Rhode Island; its maker is uncertain.

Over the following years, Munroe built several more. They were all destroyed by the mid-1930s, when a severe hurricane levelled Munroe's bayside boatshop. At least two of his designs were documented in articles in The Rudder, as was one by Robert B. Roosevelt. Small proas may have been brought back to the United States in the late 19th century, but documentation is sparse. Munroe and Roosevelt appeared to be the first two builders to adapt the proa to Western building techniques.

=== Royal Mersey Yacht Club ===
In 1860 a member of the Royal Mersey Yacht Club in England built a copy of a Micronesian proa. He used the traditional asymmetric hull, flat on the lee side, and a decked dugout ama (outrigger). While no quantitative record was made of its speed, it was noted that the proa would run at speeds that would bury the bows of any other vessel. It carried three times the ratio of sail area to immersed midships section than the fastest yachts in the club and yet drew only 38 cm (15 in).

=== Munroe's 1898 proa ===
R. M. Munroe's 1898 proa

Since Munroe had no direct experience with proas, all he had to work with was the widely distributed and incorrect plan drawing from about 1742, made during Admiral Lord Anson's circumnavigation of the globe. This drawing had been circulated in the press, for example in William Alden's articles in Harper's Magazine. (These were reprinted in a small book called The Canoe and the Flying Proa.) This proa was one of several either captured or seen under sail when Anson stopped at Tinian during a Pacific crossing. Brett, the draughtsman of the plan, is thought by some to have misinterpreted one key element, showing the mast fixed vertically in the centre of the boat. This view as based on the fact that other Micronesian proa masts were raked end-to-end as the vessel shunted and the fact that a raked mast shifts the centre of effort of the sail which would influence helm balance. However, Brett's placing of the mast in a vertical position has found to be accurate when replicas of the "Anson" proa were built and sailed by the Marinas-based organisation 500 Sails that found that in many points of sail under many conditions the proa sailed well with the mast in a vertical position. 500 Sails also found that the mast could be raked to advantage in many situations and noted that the mast step depicted in the "Anson" drawing could be interpreted as depicting a rotational point rather than a rigid mast step that would not allow raking. 500 Sails canoes employ rotational mast steps that allow mast raking.

Munroe, however, was a talented boat designer who was able to work around any problems with the drawings. His adaptations can be seen in successive proas. Rather than the deep, asymmetric hull of a traditional proa, Munroe created flat-bottomed hulls (similar to the fisolera referred to by Pigafetta), with keels or centreboards for lateral resistance. His first iteration had an iron centre fin with a half-oval profile. Rather than the traditional crab-claw sail's spars which meet at the front, Munroe's sails used what could be described as a triangular lug sail or spritsail with a boom, similar to the modern lateen sail with a shorter upper spar.

Munroe's first proa was only 9 m (30 ft) long, yet was capable of speeds which Munroe estimated at 18 knots (33 km/h). His article in The Rudder describes what can only be planing on the flat hull. As this was before the advent of planing power boats, this proa was one of the first boats capable of planing. This helped produce its amazing speed when most boats were limited to their hull speed—they had too little power to achieve planing speed, and yet were not designed to exceed hull speed without planing. For example, a 9 m (30 ft) boat with too little power to plane, and with a hull form and displacement that didn't permit it to exceed hull speed without planing, would have a maximum speed of about 7.3 knots (13.5 km/h); Munroe's proa could reach nearly 2.5 times that speed. This accomplishment was the nautical equivalent to the X-1 breaking the sound barrier.

It is not clear that traditional proas of the Pacific islanders could plane, though the long, slender hull would have a much higher speed/length ratio than other contemporary designs. Munroe was building a "cheap and dirty" sharpie hull made of two 10 m (32 ft) planks, a couple of bulkheads and a crossplanked bottom. By lucky accident he may have been the first sailor to plane his boat.

=== Roosevelt's Mary & Lamb ===
Robert Barnwell Roosevelt, uncle of American President Theodore Roosevelt, also built a proa at about the same time. He used it sailing from Long Island. It was significantly different but equally creative, and at 15 m (50 ft), much longer. From his 1898 article in The Rudder, it appeared the main hull of Roosevelt's proa was an open 1.2 m (4 ft) wide scow hull; the ama was a smaller, fully decked scow which looked like it could rock on a single aka (supporting beam). The mast was a bipod arrangement with both masts stepped to windward, with a boomed, balanced lugsail suspended from the apex. A balanced rudder at each end managed itself by pivoting 180° when its end was the "bow", and leeboards were used.

Roosevelt's short article is accompanied by photographs showing his proa Mary & Lamb, at rest and under sail. It is not clear if the boat predated Munroe's 1898 proa.

=== Munroe's 1900 Proa ===
R. M. Munroe's 1900 proa

Since Munroe wasn't aware of the raking mast, his 1900 model used two daggerboards set fore and aft of the mast, which would allow adjustment of the centre of lateral resistance to provide helm balance. From the drawings, it appears the mast is higher as well, allowing a larger sail. The sail design also changed, with the upper spar now being slightly longer than the upper edge of the sail, and projecting past the apex slightly to allow the apex to be attached to the hull. The sail was loose footed, with the boom attached to the upper spar near the sail apex, and to the clew of the sail. His article in a 1900 issue of The Rudder included more details on the construction of his second proa. A 1948 book of sailboat plans published by The Rudder includes the following specifications for the 1900 proa:

- Length overall 9 m (30 ft)
- Beam (of main hull) 76 cm (2 ft 6 in)
- Draft of hull about 13 cm (5 in)
- Draft with boards down 74 cm (2 ft 5 in)
- Sail area 22 m^{2} (240 sq ft)

From the drawings, the distance from the centre of the main hull to the centre of the aka is about 4 m (12 ft).

== Other Western interpretations ==
Western designers often feel the need to tinker with the proa. They are attracted by the minimalist nature and amazing speeds that proas are capable of (they may still be the fastest sailboats per dollar spent for the home builder) but they often want the proa to do more; adding cabins, different sailing rigs, and bidirectional rudders are common changes made. James Wharram was greatly influenced by the Proa design.

For example, unconventional boat and yacht designer Phil Bolger drew at least three proa designs; the smallest one (6.1 m (20 ft)) has been built by several people while the larger two, including his Proa 60, have not been built. For additional examples, see here.

=== Lee pods ===
Diagram of a proa with a lee pod

The terms ama and aka have been adopted for the modern trimaran. Since trimarans are generally designed to sail with one ama out of the water, they are similar to an Atlantic proa, with the buoyant leeward ama providing the bulk of the stability for the long, relatively thin main hull. Some modern proa designers have borrowed trimaran design elements for use in proas. Trimarans often have main hulls that are very narrow at the waterline, and flare out and extend over a significant portion of the akas. This top-heavy design is only practical in a multihull, and it has been adapted by some proa designers. Notable examples are the designs of Russell Brown, a boat-fittings maker who designed and built his first proa, Jzero, in the mid-1970s. He has created a number of proa designs, all of which follow the same theme.

One of the design elements which Brown used, and a number of other designers have copied, is the lee pod. The akas extend past the main hull and out to the lee side, and provide support for a cabin extending to the lee of the main hull. This is similar to the platform extending to the lee on some Micronesian proas. The lee pod serves two purposes—it can be used for bunk space or storage, and it provides additional buoyancy on the lee side to prevent a capsise should the boat heel too far. Crew can also be moved onto the lee pod to provide additional heeling force in light winds, allowing the ama to lift under circumstances when it would not otherwise. The Jzero also used water ballast in the ama to allow the righting moment to be significantly increased if needed. While Brown's proa was designed to be a cruising yacht, not a speed-sailing boat, the newer 11 m (36 ft) Jzerro is capable of speeds of up to 21 knots (39 km/h).

=== Sail rigs ===
One of the issues Western designers have with the proa is the need to manipulate the sail when shunting. Even Munroe's early sails discarded the curved yards of the traditional crabclaw for the more familiar straight yards of the lateen and lug sails. Munroe's designs likely lacked the tilting mast because he was unaware of it, but many designers since have used a fixed mast, and provided some other way of adjusting the centre of effort. Most sailboats are designed with the centre of effort of the sails slightly ahead of the centre of area of the underwater plane; this difference is called "lead." In a proa hull, and in all fore and aft symmetric foils, the centre of resistance is not at or even near the centre of the boat, it is well forward of the geometric centre of area. Thus the centre of effort of the sails needs to also be well forward, or at least needs to have a sail which is well forward which can be sheeted in to start the boat moving, allowing the rudders to bite and keep the boat from heading up when the entire sail area is sheeted in. Jzero, for example, and all of Russell Brown's other designs, use a sloop rig and hoist a jib on whichever end is the current "bow". Other designs use a schooner rig for the same effect.

One of the more practical rigs for small proas was invented by Euell Gibbons around 1950 for a small, single handed proa. This rig was a loose footed lateen sail hung from a centred mast. The sail was symmetric across the yard, and to shunt, what was previously the top end of the yard was lowered and became the bottom end, reversing the direction of the sail. Proa enthusiast Gary Dierking modified this design further, using a curved yard and a boom perpendicular to the yard. This allows a greater control of the sail shape than the traditional Gibbons rig, while retaining the simple shunting method, and is often referred to as the Gibbons/Dierking rig.

=== Foils ===
While a proa is fairly efficient at minimising the amount of wave drag and maximising stability, there is at least one way to go even further. The use of underwater foils to provide lift or downforce has been a popular idea recently in cutting-edge yacht building, and the proa is not immune to this influence.

The Bruce foil is a foil that provides a lateral resistance with zero heeling moment by placing the foil to either or both of the leeward and the windward sides, angled so the direction of the force passes through the centre of effort of the sail. Since proas already have an outrigger to the windward side, a simple angled foil mounted on the ama becomes a Bruce foil, making the already stable proa even more stable. Bruce foils are often combined with inclined rigs, which results in a total cancellation of heeling forces. Inclined rigs are also well suited to the proa, as the direction of incline remains constant during shunting.

Another use of foils is to provide lift, turning the boat into a hydrofoil. Hydrofoils require significant speeds to work, but once the hull is lifted out of the water, the drag is significantly reduced. Many speed sailing designs have been based on a proa type configuration equipped with lifting foils.

=== Variations on the theme ===
The layout of the record-making Yellow Pages Endeavour. Commonly described as a trimaran, due to the three hulls, its layout is that of a unidirectional proa, as the trailing lee hull follows in the leading hull's wake.

In a non-traditional variant, first seen among Western yacht racers, the "Atlantic proa" has an ama which is always to the lee side to provide buoyancy for stability, rather than ballast as in a traditional proa. Because the Atlantic ama is at least as long as the main hull, to reduce wave drag, this style can also be thought of as an asymmetric catamaran that shunts rather than tacking. The first Atlantic proa was the Cheers, designed in 1968 by boat designer Dick Newick for the 1968 OSTAR solo transatlantic race, in which it placed third. Newkirk's designs are primarily trimarans, and the Atlantic proa's buoyant outrigger follows naturally from a conversion of a trimaran from a tacking to a shunting vessel.

Other proa designers blur the lines between Atlantic and Pacific style proas. The Harryproa from Australia uses a long, thin hull to lee, and a short, fat hull, containing the cabin, to windward. This would normally be more like an Atlantic proa, but the rig is on the lee hull, leaving it technically a Pacific design. This and other similar proas place the bulk of the passenger accommodations on the ama, in an attempt to make the vaka as streamlined as possible, and put much of the mass in the lee side to provide a greater righting moment.

Perhaps the most extreme variants of the proa are the ones designed for pure speed. These often completely discard symmetry, and are designed to sail only in one direction relative to the wind; performance in the other direction is either seriously compromised or impossible. These are "one way" proas, such as world record speed holding Yellow Pages Endeavour, or YPE. While the YPE is often called a trimaran, it would be more correct to call it a Pacific proa, because two of the planing/hydrofoil hulls are in line. This design has been considered by others as well, such as the Monomaran designs by "The 40 knot Sailboat" author Bernard Smith, and these designs been called 3-point proas by some, a reference to the 3 point hulls used in hydroplanes. A previous record holding design, the Crossbow II, owned by Timothy Colman was a proa/catamaran hybrid. Crossbow II was a "slewing" catamaran, able to slew her hulls to allow clear airflow to her leeward bipod sail. Although the hulls appeared identical, the boat had all crew and controls, cockpit etc. in her windward hull; the leeward hull was stripped bare for minimal weight.

== Speed records ==
In March 2009, two new sailing speed records were set by vehicles based on the proa concept, one on land, and one on the water.

On 26 March 2009, Simon McKeon and Tim Daddo set a new C-class speed sailing record of 50.08 knots (92.75 km/h) over 500 meters in the Macquarie Innovation, successor to their previous record holding Yellow Pages Endeavour, with a peak speed of 54 knots (100 km/h). The record was set in winds of 22 to 24 knots (41 to 44 km/h), and came close to taking the absolute speed record on water, currently held by Hydroptère. Conditions during the record-setting run were less than ideal for the Macquarie Innovation, which is anticipated to have a top speed of 58 knots (107 km/h; 67 mph).

On 27 March 2009, Richard Jenkins set a world wind-powered speed record, on land, of 202.9 km/h (126.1 mph) in the Ecotricity Greenbird. This broke the previous record by 16 km/h (10 mph). Greenbird is based on a one-way proa design, with a long, thin two-wheeled body with a third wheel to the lee acting as an ama. The aka, which is in the shape of a wing, provides a significant amount of downwards force at speed to counter the heeling force generated by the high-aspect wing sail.

== See also ==
- Austronesian languages
- Kaep
- Lashed-lug boat
- Outrigger canoe
- Tepukei
- Vinta
