= Alain Thébault =

French yacht racer

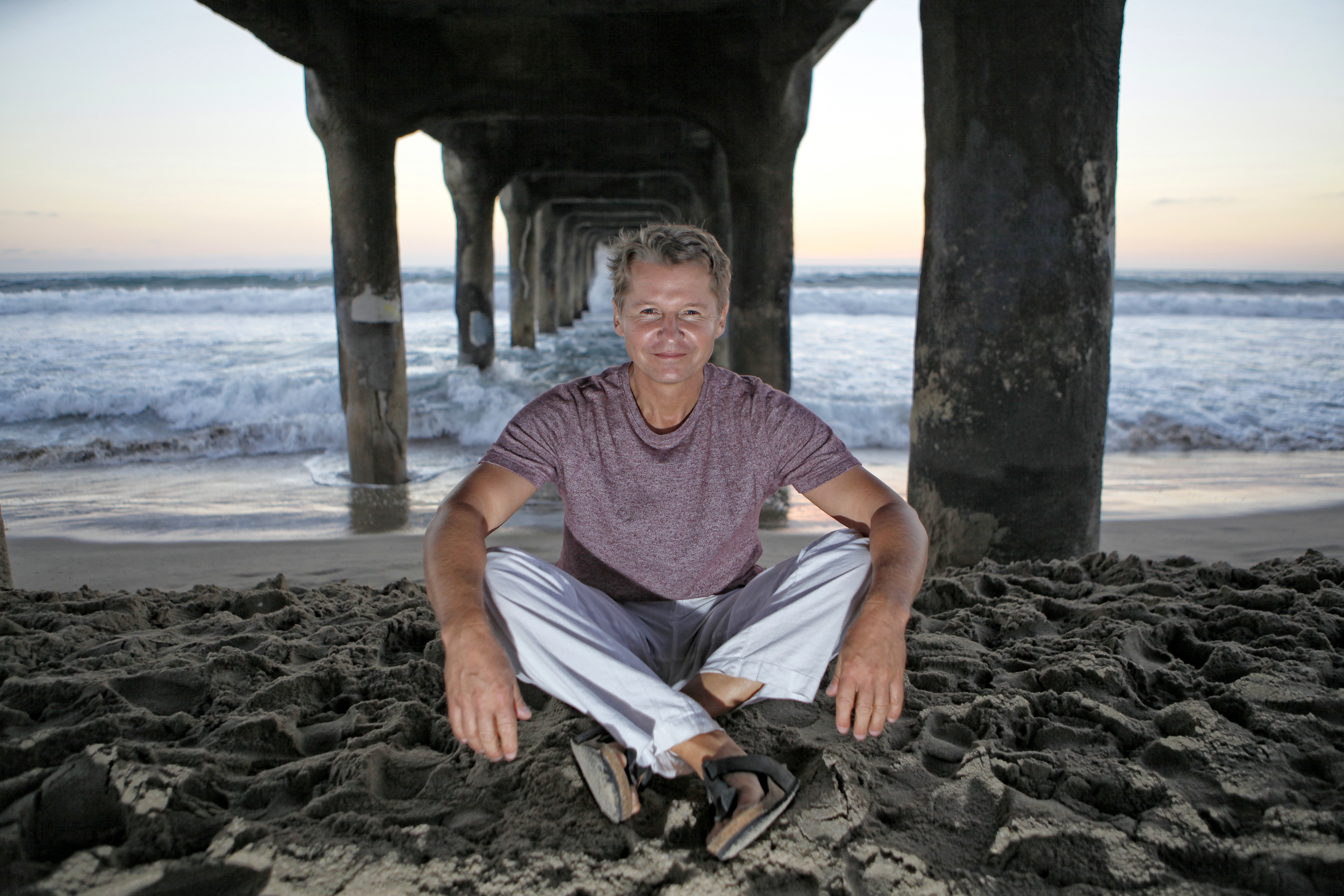
Alain Thébault

Alain Thébault is a French yachtsman, born 19 September 1962 in Dijon.

With Éric Tabarly, he participated in the conception of a multihull on hydrofoils, named l'Hydroptère, with a team of engineers, many of them from the aeronautics industry.

L'hydroptère was launched in 1995 and reached 35 knots the same year. Since 2005, with the support of Swiss banker, Lombard Odier Darier Hentsch & Cie in Geneva, he modified his yacht for an attempt to reach the speed of 50 knots and more.

After the Pacific crossing between Honolulu and Los Angeles, where Alain Thébault joined his three daughters. They thought about SeaBubbles : boats 100% electrics flying over water thanks to the foils technology. He develops the SeaBubbles company with Anders Bringdal (quadruple world champion of windsurfing and sailed many times with Alain Thébault on the Hydroptère).

== See also ==
=== Bibliography ===
- Alain Thébault, Pilote d'un rêve, Paris, Flammarion, 2005, ISBN 978-2-08-068809-5
- Alain Thébault, Le mur du vent, Paris, Editions de La Martinière, 2008, ISBN 978-2-7324-3771-2
