= Antoine Albeau =

French windsurfer (born 1972)

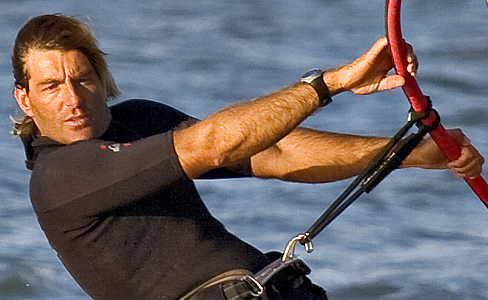
Antoine Albeau, 2006

Antoine Albeau (born 17 June 1972) is a French windsurfer who holds twenty-four Windsurfing World Championships in different disciplines since 1994.

Born in La Rochelle, France, Albeau set a new all–category world wind-powered sailing speed record on 5 March 2008 with 49.09 knots (90.91 km/h or 56.49 mph) on the Saintes Maries de la Mer Speed Canal, beating the previous record which had been set by Finian Maynard with a speed of 48.70 knots in April 2005 at the same spot. In November 2012 he improved with a new record of 52,05 knots (96.34 km/h – 59.9 mph) on the Luderitz Canal in Namibia.

In October 2008 Antoine Albeau successfully completed a cross channel windsurf from Cherbourg-en-Cotentin, France to Sandbanks, Poole. A crossing of 75 nautical miles (138 kilometres) taking just over 6 hours. Antoine was accompanied by Guy Cribb, and supported by Dave Hartwell from The Water Sports Academy, Sandbanks in a safety boat which also acted as a media platform.
