= Yellow Pages Endeavour =

Australian sailboat

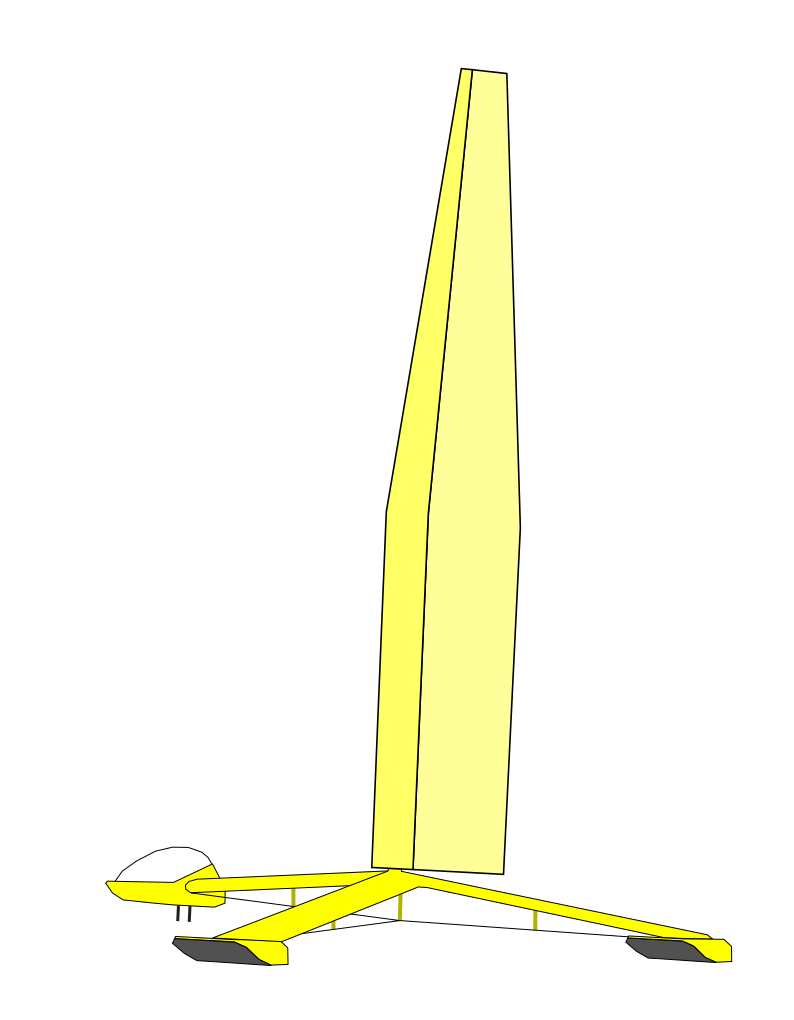
- Designer(s): Lindsay Cunningham
- Launched: 1993

Racing career
- Skippers: Simon McKeon

Specifications
- Length: 9.15 m (30.0 ft)
- Beam: 9.15 m (30.0 ft)
- Mast height: 11.3 m (37 ft)

Yellow Pages Endeavour, or YPE, is an Australian sailboat designed for speed sailing, which held the outright 500 meter world record from October, 1993 to November, 2004, when it was taken by windsurfer Finian Maynard; Yellow Pages Endeavour still holds the C class record. Yellow Pages Endeavour has been succeeded in record attempts by the similarly designed Extreme 50, renamed Macquarie Innovation, built and operated by the same team.

== Design and construction ==
Designed by Lindsay Cunningham, both boats are triscaph proa-like designs (though often referred to as a trimaran) intended for sailing in one direction. They have three hulls attached to a Y-shaped aka. The ama, or windward hull, contains the cockpit and controls for the two crew members. The remaining two hulls travel in line, forming a vaka, or leeward hull. The rigid wingsail is attached to the center of the Y. Yellow Pages Endeavour used a high aspect sail, while the Macquarie Innovation uses a larger, lower aspect sail on a wider platform in an attempt to generate more power with less heeling force. Though the designs are often referred to as foil born, the hulls are designed to plane, and both versions have been photographed with the ama lifted clear of the water. A series of cavitation resistant asymmetric foils, with fences to prevent ventilation at high speeds, are situated in the vaka hulls serve to provide lateral resistance.

The construction of the load-bearing portions of the vaka hulls and aka are primarily of unidirectional carbon fiber composite over a nomex core. These are then faired using heat shrink membrane over foam cores. The ama is constructed of lightweight marine grade plywood, and is designed to shatter and throw the crew clear of the cockpit in the event of a crash. The wingsail is made of a heat shrink membrane over a lightweight foam core.

== Record attempts ==
In October 1993 skipper Simon McKeon and crew member Tim Daddo took the world record in the Yellow Pages Endeavour with an official speed of 46.52 knots (53.5 mph or 86.2 km/h) off the coast of Sandy Point, Victoria, Australia. The record was set in winds of 19 to 20 knots (37 km/h), for a top speed of 2.3 times the windspeed.

In early testing, the Macquarie Innovation demonstrated speeds of 43 knots (80 km/h) in 15—17 knots (31 km/h) of wind, 2.5 times windspeed, and the team hopes that a good sailing day in 20 knots (37 km/h) of wind will break the 50-knot (93 km/h) barrier.

In 2008, the World Speed Sailing Record Council certified a C class 500 meter record of 48.14 knots (89 km/h) for the Macquarie Innovation, skippered by Simon McKeon at Sandy Point. In 2009, McKeon and the Innovation broke the 50 knot barrier, with a certified speed of 50.07 knots (93 km/h). The team contested the speed as certified, due to a 0.35 knots (1 km/h) adjustment to the recorded speed to compensate for an ebbing tide during the record run. The Macquarie Team position is that most, if not all, of the 0.35 knot correction was due to wind blown drift, not the ebb tide, and was therefore applied in error.

== Difficulties ==
The Yellow Pages Endeavour and Macquarie Innovation designs are highly specialized craft, designed to operate only under ideal conditions for record attempts. The location, Sandy Point, provides the unusual combination of very smooth water and high winds needed for record attempts. Even so, times when ideal conditions are available are scarce; in the 2007 season, one 28-day period yielded only 1.5 hours of good sailing time, in a 17-knot (31 km/h) wind, not enough for a record-setting performance Every run also risks a crash, which, due to the lightweight nature of the craft, can result in disaster, such as in 2004 when a capsize destroyed the Macquarie Innovation. When this happens, the vessel must be rebuilt, costing time, money, and possible good sailing days. On the other hand, Yellow Pages Endeavour set the world record only eight months after a crash that wrecked the vessel.
