= Hydroptère =

French experimental sailing hydrofoil trimaran

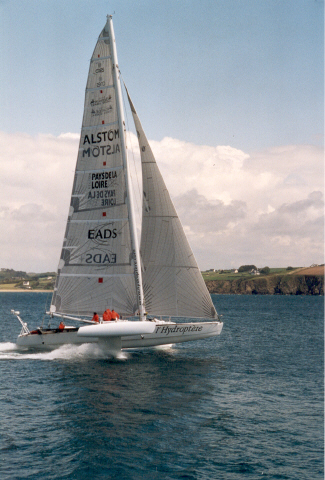
- Experimental sailing craft Hydroptère
- Designer(s): VPLP design
- Launched: 1994
- Owner(s): Chris Welsh & Gabriel Terrasse

Specifications
- Length: 60ft
- Beam: 74ft

Hydroptère is a French experimental sailing hydrofoil trimaran imagined by the yachtman Éric Tabarly. The Hydroptère project was managed by Alain Thébault, the design done by naval architects VPLP design and the manufacturing by a group of French high-tech companies. Its multihull hydrofoil design allows the sail-powered vessel to reach high speeds on water. The design is based on experience from a range of hydrofoil sailcraft that Thébault built in cooperation with Éric Tabarly since the 1980s. On 5 October 2008 she reached a record speed of 52.86 knots (97.90 km/h; 60.83 mph), however this was over a shorter distance than the 500m necessary to qualify for an official world record. On 21 December 2008, the Hydroptère briefly reached 56.3 knots (104.3 km/h; 64.8 mph) near Fos-sur-Mer, but capsized and turtled shortly thereafter.

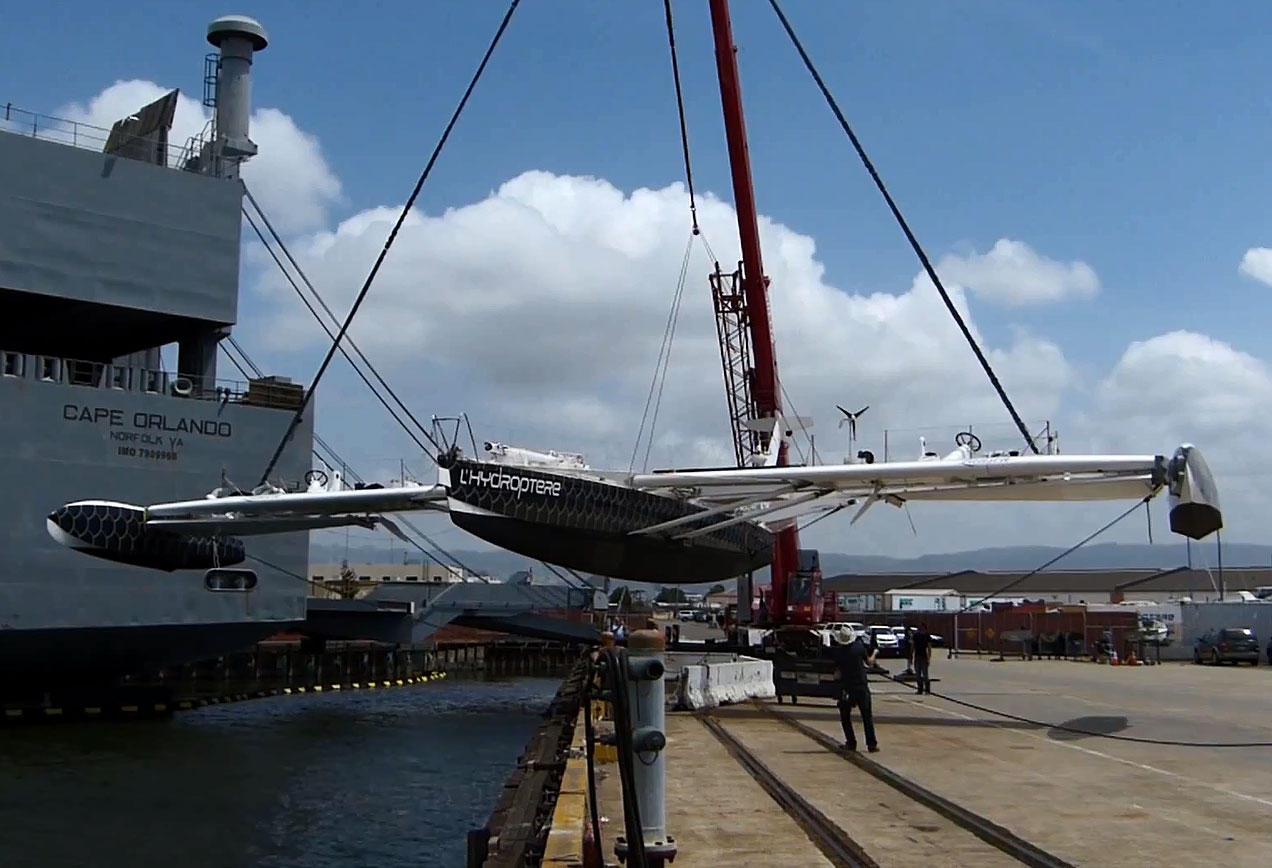
Launching Hydroptère

On 4 September 2009, the Hydroptère broke the outright world record, sustaining a speed of 52.86 knots (97.90 km/h; 60.83 mph) for 500 m (1,600 ft) in 30 knots (56 km/h; 35 mph) of wind. In November 2009, she broke the 50-knot (93 km/h; 58 mph) barrier for a nautical mile with a speed of 50.17 knots (92.91 km/h; 57.73 mph) in Hyères, France.

== Abandonment and sale ==
During July 2015, the Hydroptère sailed 2215 nautical miles from Los Angeles to Honolulu and docked in Kewalo Harbor. On 15 March 2016 the Harbor Master posted an "Abandoned Vessel" notice on the Hydroptère which was subsequently sold at auction. In June 2019, L'Hydroptère was bought by Chris Welsh (USA) and Gabriel Terrasse (FRA). In November 2019, l'Hydroptère was sailed from Honolulu, Hawaii to San Francisco, California by professional sailor Mike Price and a delivery crew so that she could undergo an extensive re-fit.

== See also ==
- Hydrofoil
- Sailing hydrofoil
- World Sailing Speed Record Council
- Speed sailing record
- Speed sailing
