= Finian Maynard =

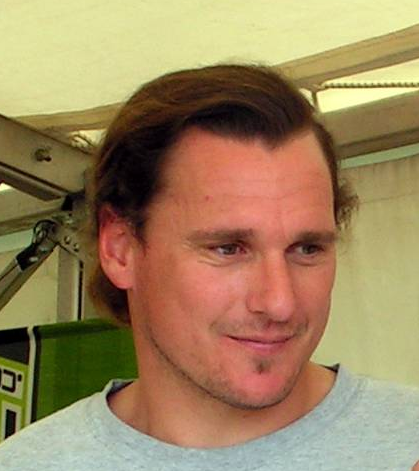
Finian Maynard in 2005

Finian Maynard (born 22 November 1974 in Dublin, Ireland) is a six-time speed windsurfing world champion (1998 – 2001, 2006 and 2009) and held the absolute 500m sailing speed record for all sailing vessels from late 2004 until early 2008.

He went to the British Virgin Islands with his parents at the age of 5, hence his sail number KV11 resp. BVI11. When he was 7, he tried windsurfing for the first time and at the age of 15, he came 13th at the US Open at Corpus Christi, Texas. His career choice had been made.

Finian Maynard is 190 cm (6 ft 3 in) tall and weighs 117 kg (258 lb). This is widely seen as a good build for a speed sailor, giving him the strength and power to achieve high speeds. On 13 November 2004 he established a new speed world record for sailing vessels by reaching 46.82 knots in the French Trench near Saintes Maries de la Mer, surpassing the speed set in 1993 at Sandy Point Australia by Simon McKeon and the boat Yellow Pages.

He improved his record a half year later, reaching 48.70 knots. Both records were acknowledged and ratified by the World Sailing Speed Record Council.

In August 2009 in Karpathos, Greece he became the 2009 World Speed Champion, and was also the 2009 Vice-World Slalom Champion on the PWA World Tour.

In 2019 Finian Maynard started his own windsurfing brand, FMX Racing.

== See also ==
- Speed sailing
