= International B-class catamaran =

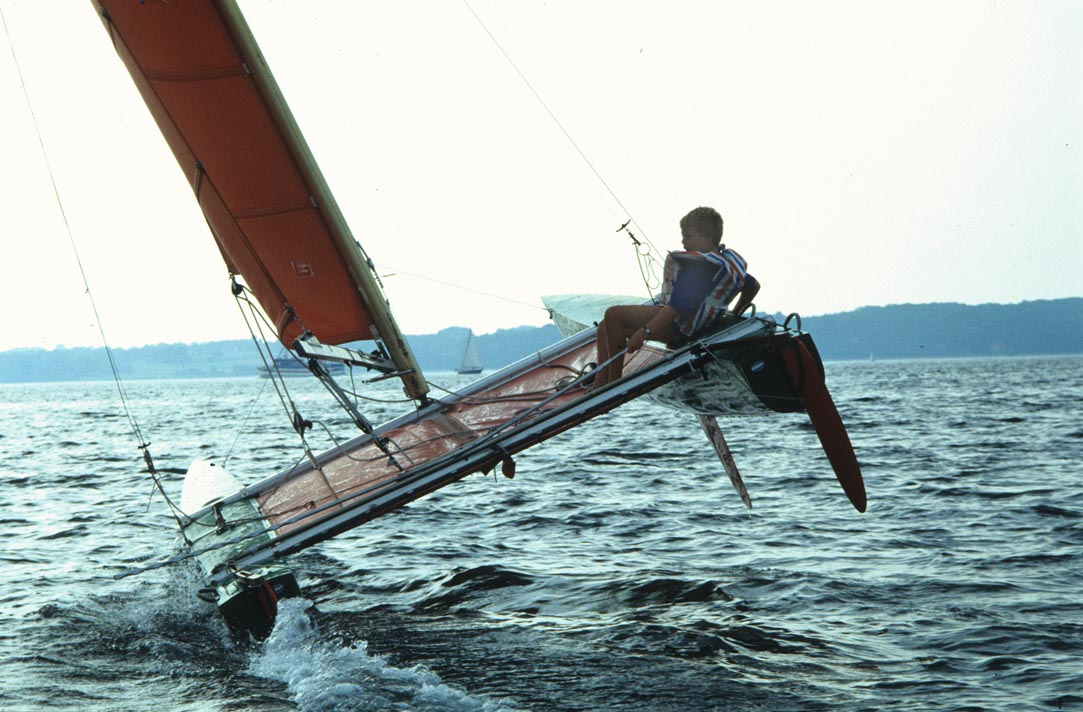
The B-Class Catamaran (Tornado)

The International B-class/F20 Catamaran is a development class of catamaran. The original B-class was later split into many modern one-design, off-the-beach catamarans.

== Background ==
The B-class was founded during the 1960s and was part of the 4-tier IYRU (now ISAF) approach to divide up the sports catamaran sailing scene into 4 separate groups. These A, B, C and D classes were governed by a very small set of class rules to which each design had to comply. In the beginning it was just:

IYRU catamaran classification
Class	Max Length	Max Beam	Max Sail Area	Crew
A-Class	18’	7’6”	150ft²	1
B-Class	20’	10’	235ft²	2
C-Class	25’	14’	300ft²	2
D-Class	32’	16’	500ft²	3

All boats designed and built to these specs would be grouped into one fleet and race each other for crossing the finish line first. The A-Class is the largest remaining of those 4 main classes, while the recent development in wing sail technology, the C-Class is enjoying a revival.

In 1967, the then International Yacht Racing Union (IYRU, now ISAF) decided to run a week long series of trials (August 5–12) to determine the best "A" and "B" classes of catamaran design to be selected for International status. The trials were held at the Catamaran Yacht Club, Isle of Sheppey (a small island in the Thames Estuary, 50 miles to the east of London), Kent, UK. The B Class was easily won by a Tornado sailed by Reg White and Bob Fisher, who took six first places out of nine races. The Tornado went on to be used for the Olympics from 1976 onwards. Nearly 50 years later, the Tornado is still one of the highest performing B Class catamarans.

The choice of such a beamy and thus difficult to trailer boat left a large gap in the market. Consequently the B-Class quickly splintered into a score of sub classes like the one-design Hobie 16's, Nacra 5.8, and more recently the Formula 16 and Formula 18 specifications with strict class rules.

== Specifications ==
The rigid specification of the Tornado combined with splintering mentioned above, has meant there has been a virtual absence of a B-class specification for many years.

The introduction of International F20 catamarans contributed to renewed interest in the class.

The current trend is to create a box rule like the A-Class but relax the rules that are preventing it from becoming fully foiling. Public opinion is leaning towards avoiding the pitfalls of the Formula 16's and Formula 18's that excluded several existing designs, such that the new spec would include all existing sub-20 ft off the beach catamarans. These dimensions are stretched out to accommodate the three production fully foiling Formula 20's: the Nacra F20 FCS, the Flying Phantom and the Marstrom M-20

Subsequently the International F20 catamarans is defined by

- Min overall boat weight : 150 kg / 330 lbs
- Max overall boat length (LOA) : 6.2 m / 20.33 ft (excl. rudders and bowsprit)
- Max overall boat width (Beam) : 3.50 m / 11.48 ft (Incl. wings and foils)
- Max upwind sail area incl. mast : 25 m² / 268.8 ft²
- Max downwind sail area incl. mast : 55 m² / 591.3 ft²
- Max sail area of mast : 3 m² / 32.25 ft²

Practical considerations:

- Must be an Off the beach catamaran (i.e. capable of being rigged and launched by hand)
- Must be legally trailer-able for road use without substantial dis-assembly

== See also ==
- List of multihulls
