= Nacra F16 =

Dutch catamaran sailboat class

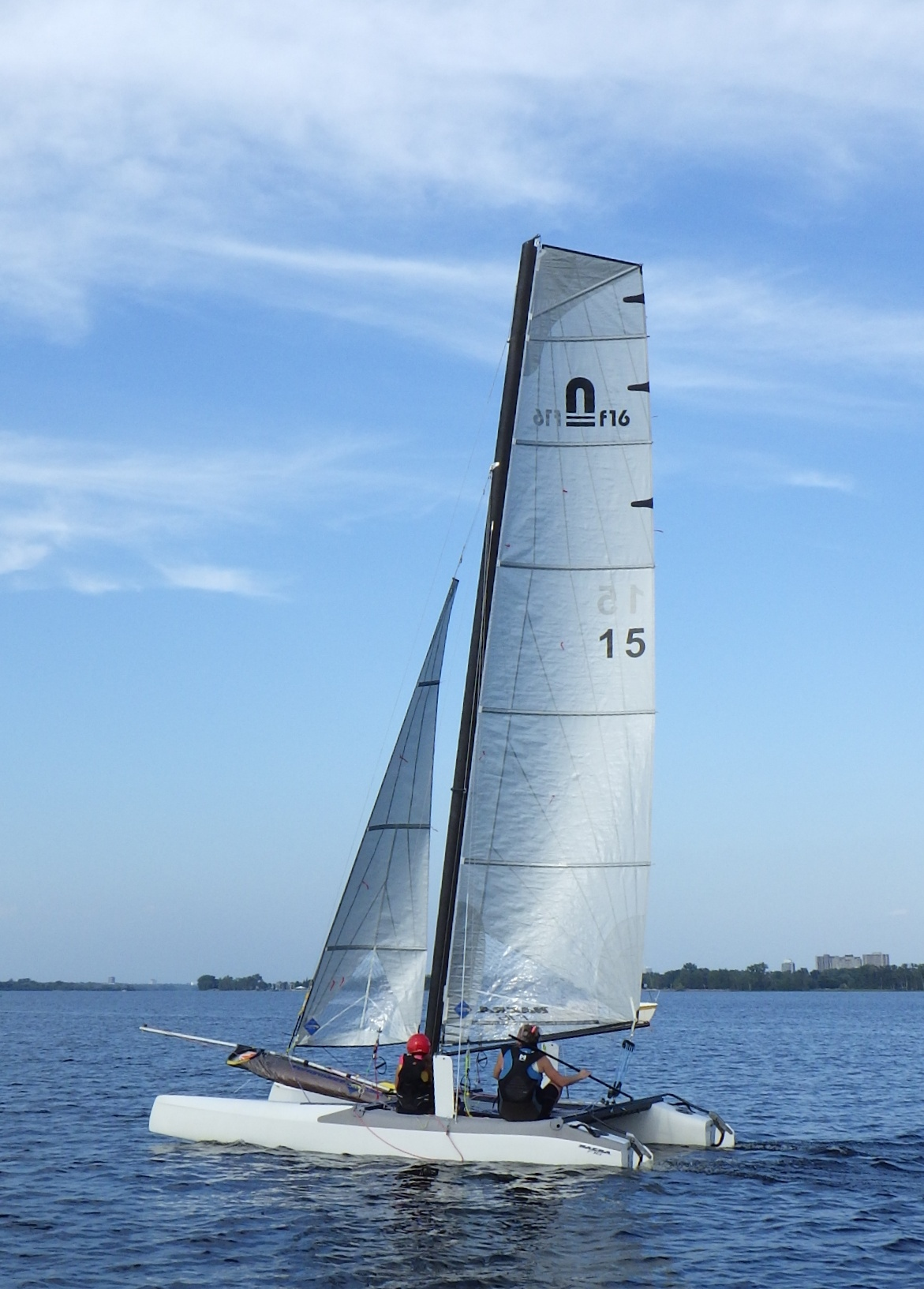

Development
- Designer: Morrelli and Melvin
- Location: Netherlands
- Year: 2011
- Builder: Nacra Sailing
- Name: Nacra F16

Boat
- Crew: one or two
- Displacement: 280 lb (127 kg)

Hull
- Type: catamaran
- Construction: carbon fibre foam sandwich
- LOA: 16.40 ft (5.00 m)
- Beam: 8.20 ft (2.50 m)

Hull appendages
- Keel: twin daggerboards
- Rudder: two transom-mounted rudders

Rig
- Rig type: Bermuda rig

Sails
- Sailplan: fractional rigged sloop
- Mainsail area: 161 sq ft (15.0 m^{2})
- Jib/genoa area: 40 sq ft (3.7 m^{2})
- Gennaker area: 188 sq ft (17.5 m^{2})
- Upwind sail area: 201 sq ft (18.7 m^{2})
- Downwind sail area: 350 sq ft (33 m^{2})

The Nacra F16 is a Dutch catamaran sailing dinghy that was designed by Americans Morrelli and Melvin as a one-design Formula 16 racer and first built in 2011.

== Production ==
The design has been built by Nacra Sailing in the Netherlands, since 2011. As of 2023 it remains in production.

== Design ==
The F16 is a racing sailboat, with the hulls built predominantly of carbon fibre foam sandwich. It has a fractional sloop rig with aramid film sails, aluminium spars and a rotating mast stepped on the forebeam. The hulls have reverse stems and plumb transoms. The twin, carbon fibre, transom-hung, kick-up rudders are controlled by a tiller. It has twin, retractable, carbon fibre daggerboards, one in each hull. The daggerboards may be straight or curved for hydrofoiling. The mainsheet has a 10:1 mechanical advantage while the mainsail Cunningham is 16:1 and jib Cunningham is 4:1. It displaces 280 lb (127 kg) empty and ready-to-sail.

For sailing the design is equipped with a 188 sq ft (17.5 m^{2}) asymmetrical spinnaker.

The design can be raced with a crew of two sailors or rigged for single-handed sailing as the F16 ONE. Each crew member has a trapeze.

== Operational history ==
The boat is supported by an active class club that organizes racing events, the Formula 16 Class Association.

== See also ==
- List of multihulls
