= International C-class catamaran =

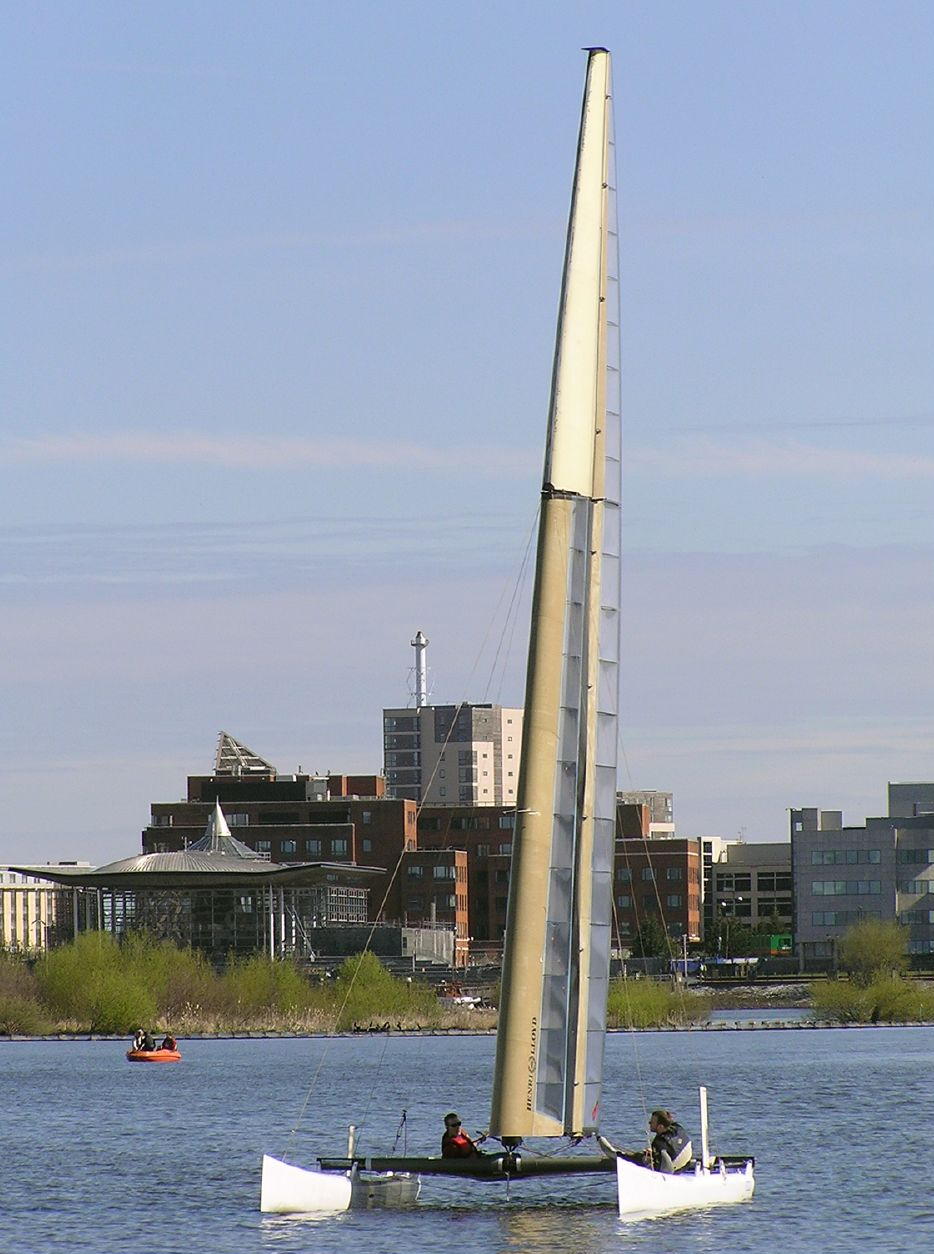

Boat
- Crew: 2 (with two trapezes)

Hull
- LOA: 7.62 m (25 ft 0 in)
- Beam: 4.267 m (14 ft 0 in)

Sails
- Upwind sail area: 27.868 m^{2} (300 sq ft)

The C-Class Catamaran is a high-performance developmental class sailing catamaran. They are very light boats which use rigid wing sails and can sail at twice the speed of the wind. They are used for match races known as the International Catamaran Challenge Trophy and its successor the International C-Class Catamaran Championship - both often referred to as the "Little America's Cup".

== Background ==
The class was founded during the 1960s and was part of the 4-tier IYRU (now ISAF) approach to divide up the sports catamaran sailing scene into 4 separate groups. These A, B, C and D classes were governed by a very small set of class rules to which each design had to comply. The A-Class is the largest remaining of those 4 main classes. The B-Class splintered into a score of sub classes like the Hobie 16's, Formula 18's and other classes that contain far more and far stricter class rules, but also gave birth to the Tornado, which became an Olympic class. The D class never really got off the ground in earnest.

Meanwhile, the C-Class quickly developed into high tech boats that were used in the Little America's Cup. These require large investments of time and money to race, and so this class is extremely small, but it maintains its status as the ultimate sailing catamaran designs.

== See also ==
- List of multihulls
