= The Worrell 1000 Race =

Offshore long distance beach catamaran sailboat race

The Worrell 1000 Race is an offshore long distance beach catamaran sailboat race that was held May 6–18, 2019 and that will be held again May 9–21, 2022. The race runs in the waters between Florida and Virginia Beach, United States. The race will cover approximately 1000 miles with overnight stops at multiple locations along the East Coast of the United States. The organizing authority for the 2022 Worrell 1000 Race will be Worrell 1000 Race Reunion Race, Inc., a 501(c)(3) nonprofit organization, (dba Worrell 1000 Race).

== History ==
The origins of Worrell 1000 can be traced to a bet in a bar at the Worrell Bros., a Virginia Beach resort restaurant between the owners of the bar, brothers Michael and Chris Worrell. The bet was that it was impossible to sail a sixteen-foot catamaran from Virginia Beach to Florida. On October 1, 1974, Michael Worrell and his crew Steve McGarrett left the Virginia Beach oceanfront with hopes of reaching Florida in one piece. Although they did not win the bet they still sailed through two hurricanes and had to make multiple boat repairs. After twenty days, they had to stop in Fort Lauderdale due to their catamaran being in poor condition.

Later, Worrell thought of turning the 954-mile journey into a regular regatta. The inaugural race, called Worrell Bros. Coastwise Race, took place in May 1976. Four teams participated in the race. For that first race, limited to 16-foot Hobie Cats, there were very few rules. The participants could sail day and night, but they were supposed to come ashore and phone the restaurant once every 24 hours. The course was flipped with the start in Fort Lauderdale and the finish in Virginia Beach, to take advantage of the prevailing winds. The only team to finish the first race was that of Worrell and crew Guerry Beatson. Two racers didn't make it past Georgia, however the boat crewed by Peter Guthrie and Alan Kramer maintained the lead through Nags Head, North Carolina. Knowing they were well ahead they pulled ashore at the Nags Head pier to take a break. In the distance they saw a sail far to the south and ran to the beach to launch their boat for the final run to Virginia Beach. However, they did not realize how steep the surf was and when they attempted to launch in the high surf it overturned the boat and it broke apart allowing Worrell and Benson to win. The inaugural race took 13 days to complete.

In 1985, the rules were changed to allow any catamaran within a 20-foot length, 8-foot beam, instead of just Hobie Cats. In 1988, the rules were changed to allow only 20-foot catamarans.

In 1988 new owners World 1000. INC., George Hazzis and V. Alfred Etheridge Jr. took over. In 1988 the name was changed to World 1000, to reflect its development into an international event drawing champion sailors from across the United States and around the World, the race is more daring than ever, holding fast to its basis premises, make the rules simple, take the best of both sailor and the equipment, and ingenuity, courage, and determination, keep the United States on the left, and go as fast as you can. Each boat in the World 1000 must be no longer than 21 1/4 feet. Must float if capsized, must solely be powered by wind and currents of the water, must be capable of safely launching from and landing the beach, must weigh more than 400 pounds.

For 2019, eligible classes were the Nacra F20 Carbon (in compliance with international Nacra F20 Carbon Class Rules dated 2011 (Revision 2018)) and the Formula 18. For the 2022 event, scheduled to take place May 9 to May 21, 2022, only F18s will be allowed to compete.

Michael Worrell died on June 5, 2010.

== Race strategy ==
There have been many teams who have discussed their individual strategies over the years, and for the most part - the single, best one is to "Keep the continent to your left and sail as fast as you can." The second - don't go too far offshore, even if you think the wind looks better. Many a skipper has ventured out only to find they gave up a lot of distance and fell back in the standings. Cape Hatteras can be very tricky and the famed "Atlantic Graveyard" has competitors sailing over many a lost ship on the ocean floor. Be mindful of advice from past competitors and heed all warnings given by the race committee and PRO - all of which are seasoned Worrell veterans and do their best to steer the competitors right. Don't confuse shoals with sea turtles.

== See also ==
- Hobie Hotline article 1979 Race pages 24-29
- Yachting magazine August 1980 announcing the winners for that year page 116
- Sports Illustrated article about the 1981 race
- Hobie Hotline article 1982 race pages 40-43, 47
- pdf Hobie Hotline article 1984 race pages 30-43
- Small article about the 1985 race, Yachting magazine September 1985, page 58
- MotorBoating & Sailing book August 1987 detailed article about that year's race and historical info
- Outside magazine September article about the 1998 race

Year	Boat Type	Entrants	Winner	Notes
1976	Hobie 16	5	Michael Worrell / Guerry Beatson	24-hour continuous format; called the "Worrell Bros. Coastwise Race"
1977	Hobie 16	10	Michael Worrell / Gene Landers / Tom Wickenhauser	24-hour continuous format; called the "Worrell Bros. Coastwise Race"
1978	Hobie 16	7	Michael Worrell / Gene Landers / Joe E. Lungwitz	24-hour continuous format; called the "Worrell Bros. Coastwise Race"
1979	Hobie 16	9	Team Heritage Transmission: Ron Anthony / Tom Reed / Robert Perrin	24-hour continuous format; Shortened name to "Worrell 1000"
1980	Hobie 16	9	Team Peabody's (New Zealand): Rob Perrin / Rob Jeavous / Andy Stagg	24-hour continuous format; Total elapsed time for winner – 4 days, 11 hours, 49 minutes
1981	Hobie 16	11	Team Australia; Brett Dryland / Don Wood / Rod Waterhouse	Only time in Worrell history the race was delayed (36 hours) due to 40-knot gale-force winds at the Cape
1982	Hobie 16	10	Team USA: Carlton Tucker / Hobie Alter Jr. / Miles Wood	"Pit-stop" record of 8 seconds set by team Tidewater, Cape Hatteras checkpoint
1983	Hobie 16	10	Team Australia; Brett Dryland / Rod Waterhouse	1st year with overnight stops format. Last year that Ron Anthony raced – he died July of that year
1984	Hobie 16	10	Team Rudee's: Dean Froome / Enrique Figueroa	The year one of the grounds crew lost their jeep when it was swept out to sea
1985	Switched to 20' & Under rule	12	Team Sandwich Island: Randy Smyth / Jay Glaser	1st year open to custom & stock boats 20' length x 8' beam. The fleet included a modified Hobie 18, Nacra 5.8s, G-Cat 5.7's, Supercat 19's & 19' Stampede
1986	20' & Under Rule	5	Team Dominos; Greg Richardson / Roy Seaman	Only 3 boats finish; National Geographic filmed a documentary that aired on the (then) Turner Network (National Geographic Explorers)
1987	20' & Under Rule	16	Team Hall's Auto World; Roy Seaman / Al Etheridge	Only 5 boats finish that year
1988	Updated to 20' Only Rule – TWO Classes allowed; Open & Modified Production	13	Open Class: Team Australia; Ian Bashford / Rod Waterhouse Modified Production Class: Team Bliss; Rick Bliss / Steve Tartaglino	Last leg cancelled, Australia declared winner. Only Rick Bliss/Steve Tartaglino went on to Va Beach. Called the "World 1000"
1989	20' Only Rule	10	Team Super Lube; Randy Smyth / Kevin Burnham	2nd, Australia; 3rd, Russia; 4th, Loctite (Onsgard/Casto) 5th, Tartagliano/Najmy Only 5 finishers. Called the "World 1000"
1990-1996	No races			
1997	20' Only Rule	13	Team Chick's Beach; Randy Smyth / Jason Sneed	Its return hailed as a "production class event" Only 6 boats finish
1998	20' Only Rule	21	Team Chick's Beach; Randy Smyth / Jason Sneed	Course record set: 75:17; Stood until 2002. Only 7 boats finish
1999	20' Only Rule	13	Team Chick's Beach; Randy Smyth / Keith Notary	Randy wins despite an infected rope burn on his right leg
2000	Nacra Inter 20	19	Team Blockade Runner; Randy Smyth / Matt Struble	Only 15 of 19 teams finish
2001	Nacra Inter 20	21	Team Alexander's On The Bay; Brian Lambert / Jamie Livingston	First time an all female team participated: Ketie Pettibone & Eleanor Hay. 16 of 21 teams finish
2002	Nacra Inter 20	25	Team Alexander's On The Bay; Brian Lambert / Jamie Livingston	Course record set: 71:32:55 - Still stands
2003-2018	No races			
2019	Carbon 20/F18	3	Team Australia; Rod Waterhouse / Beau White	Dubbed the "Worrell 1000 Reunion Race" after a 17-year hiatus
2022 (Delayed from 2021 to 2022 due to COVID)	F18	13	Team Australia; Rod Waterhouse / Chris Way	Mantra was "13 to VA Beach!" in a very rough weather year. All 13 made it through to the final leg with just one team dismasting and not making it to va beach during the last leg.
2024	F18			50th Anniversary Race: "Celebrating the Spark that Lit the Flame" to run in May 2024; Registration opened on 4/19/23 and the field of 15 filled within 48 hours.
