= Nacra F18 Infusion =

Sailboat class

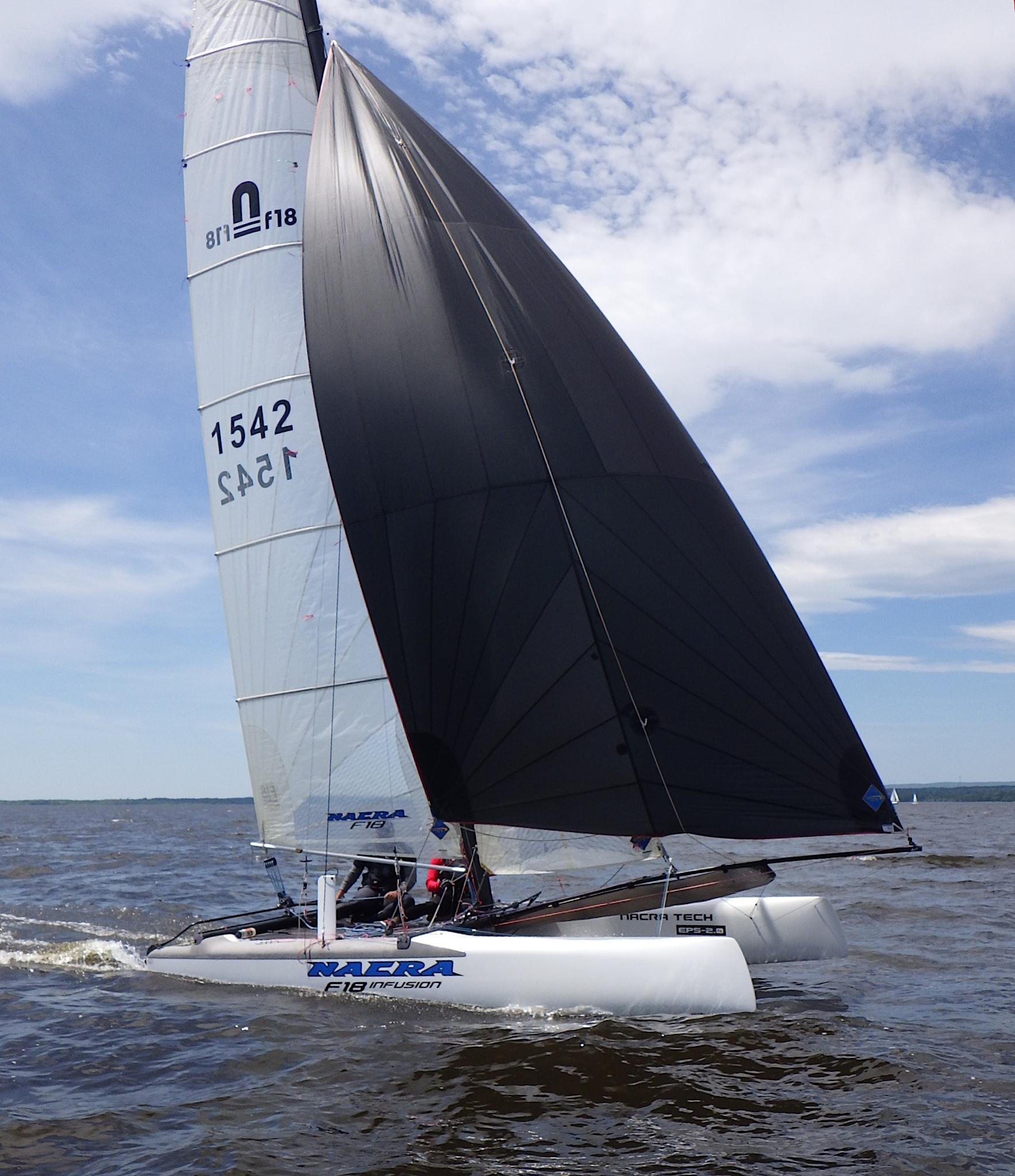

Development
- Designer: Morrelli & Melvin, Vink, Larsen, Young
- Location: Netherlands; United States
- Year: 2007
- Brand: Nacra Sailing
- Builder: [
- Role: One-design racer
- Name: Nacra F18 Infusion

Boat
- Crew: 2
- Displacement: 397 lb (180 kg)
- Trapeze: Twin

Hull
- Type: Catamaran
- Construction: vinylester fibreglass foam sandwich
- LOA: 18.11 ft (5.52 m)
- Beam: 8.53 ft (2.60 m)

Hull appendages
- Keel: twin daggerboards
- Rudder: twin transom-mounted rudders

Rig
- Rig type: Bermuda rig

Sails
- Sailplan: Fractional rigged sloop
- Mainsail area: 183 sq ft (17.0 m^{2})
- Jib/genoa area: 46 sq ft (4.3 m^{2})
- Spinnaker area: 226 sq ft (21.0 m^{2})
- Total sail area: 229 sq ft (21.3 m^{2})

Racing
- Class association: Formula 18

The Nacra F18 Infusion was announced in 2006 and launched in January 2007 as a one design racing catamaran conforming to the Formula 18 class rules. It quickly developed into a class in its own right.

The principal design team was Morrelli & Melvin but also included significant input from Peter Vink (Performance Sails) and Gunnar Larsen (Nacra).

The design takes its name from the vacuum infusion process used in its hull construction.

The Nacra F18 Infusion has been a recognized World Sailing as an international competition class since November 2010.

The Nacra F18 Infusion design was later developed into the F18 Evolution and the NACRA F20 Carbon.

== Design ==
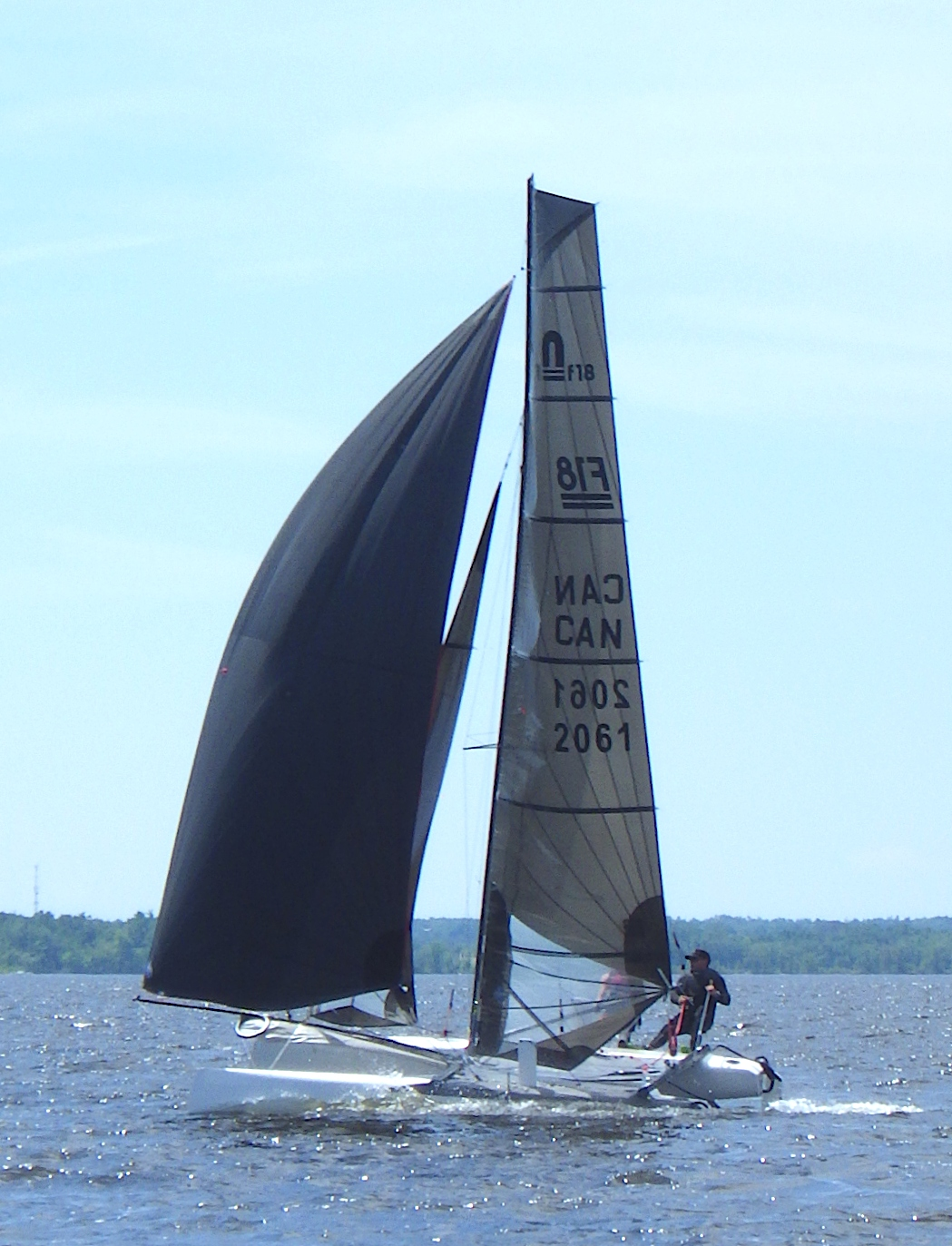
NACRA F18 Infusion

The Nacra F18 Infusion is a racing sailboat, built to the Formula 18 Class Rules and its own One Design construction manual. These rules dictate that it is a fractional sloop rig with aluminum spars. The boat has a sandwich construction with fibreglass skins made using vinylester resin over a foam core. The Mk3 version uses epoxy resin rather than vinylester resin which, due to revised Formula 18 class rules, is permitted to use.

== Variants ==
The Nacra infusion is the third generation of Nacra Formula 18. It started in 1996 with the launch of the Nacra Inter 18 designed by Gino Morrelli and Pete Melvin. This was followed in 2001 by the Nacra Inter 18 designed by Alain Comyn.

Nacra F18 Infusion Mk1
Announced in 2006, the design began production in 2007.

Nacra F18 Infusion Mk2
Launched in 2011, the boat was upgraded with new foils and several other updates.

Nacra F18 Infusion Mk2.5
Launched in 2014, the main update was a completely new sail design. The rudder system was also significantly updated, along with other small improvements.

Nacra F18 Infusion Mk3
Launched in 2018, the boat has epoxy construction and several upgrades.

Nacra F18 Infusion Mk3 with FCS (Flight Control System)
Launched in 2018, the FCS option was also made available alongside the standard boat. It has updated daggerboard cases and rudder fixing to allow the installation of optional hydrofoils. These changes took the boat out of the class, but like the Nacra 20 FCS, it was still a fully foiling design. It utilises L-shaped hydrofoil rudders and Z-shaped carbon fibre daggerboards.

With the introduction of the Evolution in 2019, the Infusion Mk3 made the modification standard in 2021.

Nacra F18 Evolution
This model was announced in 2019 and is a new design equipped only for the Formula 18 class. The biggest change is the new hull design incorporating reverse raked stems, horizontal chines, a revised longitudinal connecting beam design and deck sweeping mainsail option. It won the Formula 18 World Championship in its second attempt, finishing in the top 10 in 2021 and then winning the 2022.

== Operational history ==
The Nacra infusion has won the Formula 18 World Championships five times 2008, 2009, 2013, 2014, 2015. In addition the class has held a One Design World Championships.

Year	Gold	Silver	Bronze	Ref.
2011	NED3; Coen de Koning (NED); Thijs Visser (NED)	NED1933; Gunnar Larsen (NED); Sam Frank (sailing) (NED)	AUS1978; Adam Beattie (AUS); Jamie Leitner (AUS)	
2012	Gunnar Larsen (NED); Sam Frank (NED)	Coen de Koning (NED); Thijs Visser (NED)	Jorden Veenman (NED); Frank De Waard (NED)	
2013	AUS1668; Adam Beattie (AUS); Jamie Leitner (AUS)	AUS26; Mick Guinea (AUS); Viv Haydon (AUS)	AUS1646; Warren Guinea (AUS); Aaron Linton (AUS)	
2015	1884; Bastiaan Tentij (NED); Max van Pinxten (NED)	GER211; Jurgen Kerstens (GER); Tina Vercouteren (GER)	NED5; Tony Mels (NED); Claske Boschma (NED)	

== See also ==
- List of multihulls
