= Miss Nylex catamaran =

Miss Nylex
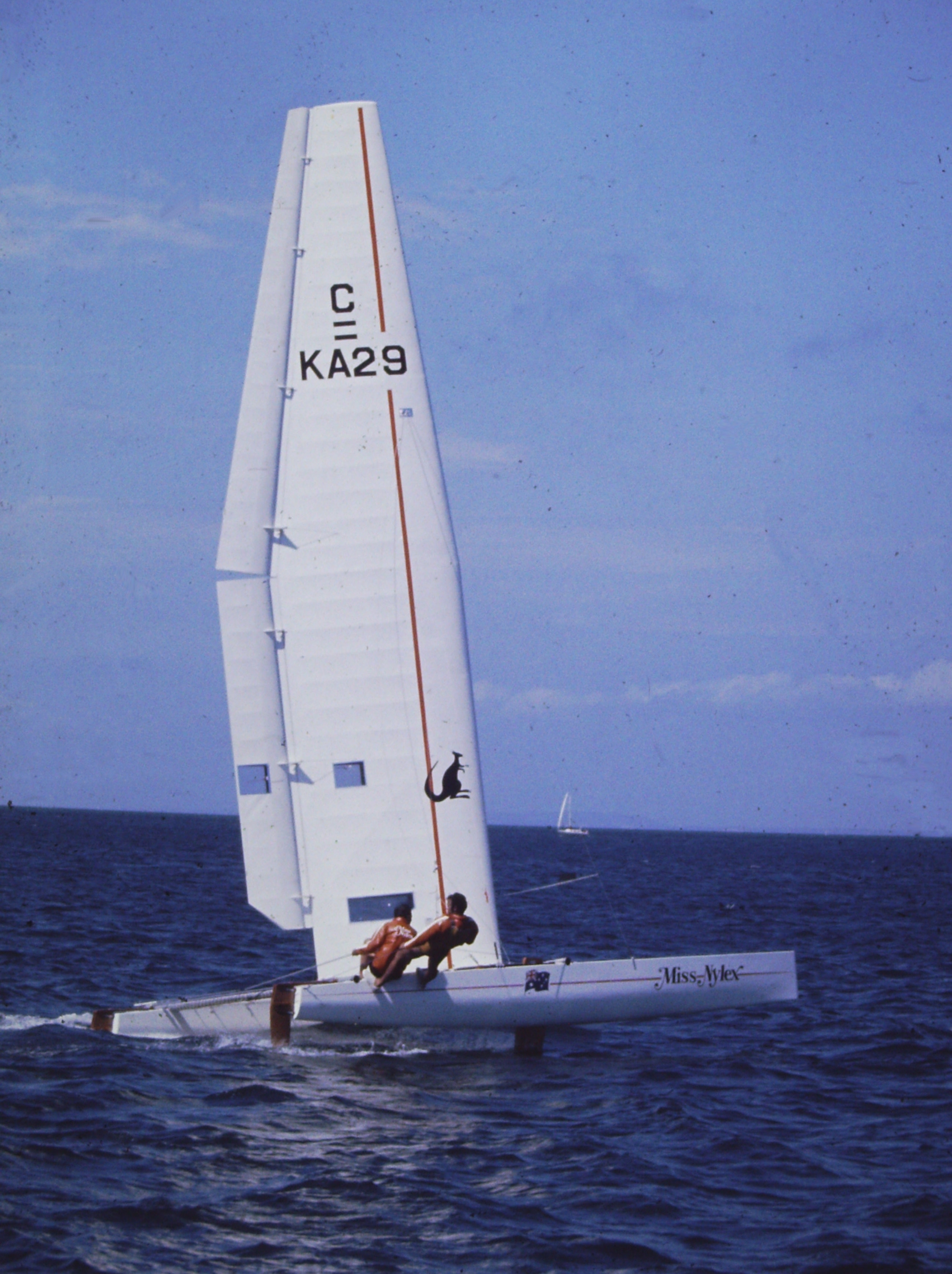
- Miss Nylex catamaran (photo: Chris Wilson)
- Yacht club: Blairgowrie Yacht Squadron
- Nation: Australia
- Class: C-Class catamaran
- Sail no: KA29
- Designer(s): Roy Martin
- Builder: Len Dobson
- Launched: 1972
- Owner(s): Nylex Corporation Ltd
- Fate: Donated to Australian National Maritime Museum in 1988

Racing career
- Skippers: Chris Wilson (1972); Bruce Proctor (1974 - 1976)
- Notable victories: International Catamaran Challenge Trophy 1974

Specifications
- Type: Catamaran
- Length: 25 feet
- Beam: 14 feet
- Mast height: 36 feet
- Sail area: 300 square feet
- Crew: John Buzaglo (1972); Graeme Ainslie (1974 - 1976)

Miss Nylex is a C-Class racing catamaran, designed and built in Australia in the 1970s specifically to compete in the International Catamaran Challenge Trophy (ICCT). It has a single wingsail with two aerodynamic flaps, instead of the conventional mast and sail combination.

Miss Nylex won the ICCT in 1974 and was the first catamaran in the world to win the race using a wingsail. The wingsail design was revolutionary for its time and changed the course of C-Class catamaran racing. All winners of the ICCT from 1977 to 2007 were subsequently won using wingsail designs.

Miss Nylex was designed by Roy Martin and built by Victorian boatbuilder Len Dobson. When launched in 1972, it was the fastest catamaran in the world, breaking the speed record for an Australian yacht at 24 knots.

== History ==
The story of Miss Nylex began in 1971 when a syndicate was established to build a yacht to defend the ICCT, which Australia had won from Denmark in 1970. The 1970 win had brought the trophy ‘down under’ for the first time and the Sorrento Sailing Club was tasked with defending the trophy and hosting the event on Port Phillip Bay near Melbourne. The ICCT was also known at the time as the ‘Little America’s Cup’ due to similarities in the selection process, elimination series and the actual final racing with the America's Cup.

The Miss Nylex syndicate was formed by John Buzaglo (later OAM) and Frank Strange, with backing by the founder of the Nylex Corporation, Peter (later Sir Peter) Derham. The syndicate also included Chris Wilson, Leon Ward and boat designer Roy Martin.

Buzaglo and Strange had known the yacht designer and automotive engineer Roy Martin since the early 1960s through local Melbourne sailing networks, including the Australian Catamaran Association. Roy Martin had designed catamarans for their business, Sailcraft Australia, and they decided that he was the best person to design a new yacht to defend the trophy.

Since 1965, the ICCT had been sailed over a course of a set shape and length, laid out carefully according to the prevailing wind direction. Most of the race was spent beating to windward or broad reaching. The syndicate decided that the new boat would need to perform well under these conditions. After assessing the likely challenger from the United States, the syndicate decided that the existing defender, Quest III (ICCT winner in 1970), would probably be superior, giving them the freedom to experiment with something new without jeopardising Australia's chance of winning.

Drawing on his aeronautical expertise, designer Roy Martin developed a 'rigid aerofoil rig' or solid wingsail, which was highly efficient in upwind sailing conditions. Designers in the United States and Denmark had been experimenting with wingsails, but without much success in racing conditions (e.g. Patient Lady II).

An experimental 25-foot model wing was built and tested to see if the concept would work. The test wingsail was mounted on the hulls of the catamaran ‘The Adventurer’, another Roy Martin design developed for Sailcraft Australia. The test wingsail is currently on display in the foyer of the Blairgowrie Yacht Squadron, Victoria Australia (as at January 2018).

The test wingsail model was successful and proved that the concept worked, so the syndicate proceeded with building the full 36-foot wingsail version that became Miss Nylex, at a cost of approximately AUD$7000. The boat was built by Victorian boatbuilder Len Dobson.

Upwind, Miss Nylex had no equal and at the time was the fastest catamaran in the world, breaking the speed record for an Australian yacht at 24 knots. Miss Nylex also beat 18-foot skiffs on Sydney Harbour in a 'Cock-o-the-Harbour' speed race.

However, early versions of Miss Nylex were problematic and the boat had too much power when sailing downwind in winds of over 20 knots. In these conditions, the wing was so powerful that the crew were unable to control the craft. When broad reaching, the boat tended to veer to leeward in gusts over 25 knots. These problems were refined over time and reliability improved.

== 1972 - development ==
In 1972, eight contenders competed in the ICCT Australian selection trials. Miss Nylex was highly competitive and considered by many to be the superior boat, but the selectors (Jock Sturrock, Russ Gibbons and Bob Clark) conservatively opted for Quest III, the Charlie and Lindsay Cunningham entrant, as the Australian contender for that series. Miss Nylex was faster in the trials, but the syndicate did not have a spare wingsail if anything got damaged during the race and the selectors were also cautious about the reliability of the revolutionary new design.

The defence of the trophy was hosted in February 1972 by the Sorrento Sailing Club against a challenge by Weathercock of the USA. Quest III had been highly tuned during the selection trials and comfortably beat Weathercock four races to nil, winning the trophy for Australia for a second time. This kept the trophy at Sorrento Sailing Club, the neighbouring club to Blairgowrie Yacht Squadron where Miss Nylex was based, which gave the syndicate the opportunity to further develop the wingsail design.

== 1974 - wingsail wins ==
For the Australian selection trials in 1974, the design of Miss Nylex had been refined and the wingsail rig had been modified to eliminate many of the earlier problems of too much power in high winds. A new wingsail had been built and the original wingsail was kept as a reserve in case of damage. The rigging had been modified to allow much greater wing rotation for downwind sailing and for reducing power in heavy weather conditions.

In 1974, Charlie and Lindsay Cunningham decided not to enter Quest III in the selection trials. leaving three boats to contest the trials: Helios, a Sydney-based entrant with an innovative Lock Crowther designed multi-section wing; Panther, considered to be a sister boat to Quest III; and Miss Nylex.

Miss Nylex won the trials and Australia accepted a challenge from New Zealand with their boat ‘Miss Stars’ (Sail Number KZ2). Miss Stars had an interesting solid backward-curved wing mast that covered about one third of the sail area. Miss Stars was competitively sailed by helmsman Brett de Thier, but was heavier and less efficient than Miss Nylex, which was sailed by an experienced crew of Bruce Proctor (helmsman) and Graeme Ainslie, who had both sailed on Quest III in the successful 1972 campaign. Australia beat New Zealand, four races to nil.

Although Miss Nylex had a known weakness in very light winds, all four races were sailed in favourable 12 to 18 knot winds and in every race Miss Nylex took the lead from the starting line. The smallest margin between the boats in any heat at the first windward mark was one minute 20 seconds. Miss Nylex won the first race by almost 22 minutes and Miss Stars’ best result was approximately nine minutes behind Miss Nylex in the third race.

Australia's victory with the new wingsail design was a world first in yacht racing. Roy Martin was named Victorian Yachtsman of the Year 1974, which was the first time a yacht designer had won this award.

== 1976 - wingsail vs sail ==
In the lead up to the next ICCT race held in 1976, the Miss Nylex syndicate decided to use basically the same wingsail rig design as used in 1974, figuring that the original concept had been successful and that there was no point in making significant changes until the advantages and disadvantages of the initial design were fully tested. The syndicate also decided to retain the tried and tested original 1974 crew of Bruce Proctor and Graeme Ainslie.

After a successful selection trial campaign, Miss Nylex was chosen to defend the ICCT trophy for a second time, seeing off a challenge in the trials of a resurrected Quest III.

Miss Nylex was known to be superior in winds over 15 knots, which meant that race day weather conditions would significantly influence the result. Race organisers and syndicate members were aware of this, but took the risk knowing that 12 to 20 knot winds commonly prevailed off Sorrento, where the race was to be held.

Australia accepted a challenge from the United States with their boat Aquarius V (Sail Number US76).

Weather and wind strength did indeed prove to be the deciding factor in the 1976 series. Aquarius V had a conventional mast and soft sail rig and was superior in light winds, while Miss Nylex outperformed Aquarius V in winds above 12 knots. After five races, Aquarius V was down two races to three against Miss Nylex, but light winds in the final two races enabled Aquarius V to come from behind and win the series, taking back the trophy to the United States for the first time since 1961.

After the 1976 race, Miss Nylex was offered for sale to Tony Di Mauro of Connecticut, owner of C-Class catamaran 'Patient Lady', but he declined due to the price being too high, saying it would cost him over AUD$30,000 to purchase the boat. The syndicate disbanded, as a new sponsor could not be found to contest the 1977 challenge series and Miss Nylex was placed into storage.

== Design and construction ==
Miss Nylex has an aerofoil wingsail similar to an aircraft wing with two trailing edge flaps, which are attached with simple hinges. With the flaps attached, it weighs approximately 68 kg. The total weight of the boat is approximately 318 kg.

The wingsail is an all timber structure glued together with Araldite, with no metal fastenings. It is built around a main spar of plywood with flanges of aircraft quality spruce. The ribs are balsa, covered on the leading edge with plywood. Balsa was used to keep the weight down, while still being considered strong enough for the purpose.

The wingsail is covered with terylene sailcloth and the whole wing surface was finished with white durathane paint, which was painted on at the Moorabbin Airport in Melbourne.

In 1975, the rig was modified to allow greater mast rotation downwind and windows were added to the wing and a flap, which gave the helmsman greater indication of air flow on the leeward side of the rig. The window in the wingsail is an identifying feature of the second boat that was built.

Miss Nylex has narrow, deep, round-bottomed hulls made of fibreglass and balsa wood sandwich. This shape was relatively conventional for top C Class catamarans in the 1970s. A catamaran's position in the water can vary from both hulls partially immersed (level trim) to one hull completely out of the water (full heel). The hull shape chosen for Miss Nylex had the lowest wetted surface area over the widest range of heel angles.

The second set of hulls, used for the 1976 campaign, was built by the Commonwealth Aircraft Corporation in Melbourne (where Roy Martin once worked). These were based on the original hulls made by Len Dobson, but were approximately 45 kg lighter.

The decks are made of the same fibreglass/balsa sandwich structure as the hulls and are also covered with heavy terylene cloth. The beams are made of high strength aluminium alloy tubes. The centreboards and rudders were also carefully designed to maximise performance and are made of highly polished wood to minimise drag.

All materials were readily available at the time, which enabled repairs to be done simply and quickly.

== Operation ==
Compared to conventional catamarans at the time, the control gear on Miss Nylex was quite simple. The main wingsail control system consists of a main sheet for controlling the angle of the wingsail relative to the boat, and various flap angle controls. Standard yacht fittings were used and very few special parts were required.

The flaps are controlled by a simple bell crank attached to the leading edge with two control wires running down through the wingsail to a simple lever system at the base of the wing, which rotates and allows the flaps to be set properly on each tack. The flaps are adjusted by two rope sheets, one on each side.

Although the crew had very few controls to work, practice was required to adapt to the revolutionary new design. For example, when tacking, the wingsail would sometimes gain power before the crew could reach the other side of the boat.

The forces of the wingsail rig were so well distributed into the hulls that the control gear proved very reliable and no significant failures were experienced in the four or five main years that the boat raced. In moderate wind speeds, Miss Nylex was a surprisingly simple boat to sail, which enabled the crew to concentrate on boat handling and tactics, without being overworked.

== Current status ==
In the 1980s, Miss Nylex was restored to its original condition by members of the syndicate and other interested parties. It was donated to the Australian Maritime Museum in Sydney by the C-Class Catamaran Association, where it is part of the National Maritime Collection and listed on the Australian Register of Historic Vessels. Miss Nylex was on display in the foyer of the Museum when it opened in 1991, but it has been in storage since 2006.
