= NACRA =

NACRA may refer to:

- Nacra Sailing, brand name for a line of small catamaran sailboats
- North America Caribbean Rugby Association, the former name of Rugby Americas North from 2001 through 2016
