= Viper (catamaran) =

Type of sailboat

Development
- Designer: Greg Goodall
- Year: 2007
- Name: Viper

Boat
- Crew: 1-2
- Draft: 0.5 m (1 ft 8 in)
- Trapeze: 2

Hull
- Construction: Glass/Epoxy foam sandwich by AHPC
- Hull weight: 129 kg (284 lb)
- LOH: 5.0 m (16.4 ft)
- Beam: 2.5 m (8 ft 2 in)

Sails
- Mainsail area: 15 m^{2} (160 sq ft)
- Jib/genoa area: 3.7 m^{2} (40 sq ft)
- Spinnaker area: 17.5 m^{2} (188 sq ft)

The Viper is a performance catamaran used for racing; it is a one design within the Formula 16 class. It is recognised as a class by the International Sailing Federation.

In early 2012 International Sailing Federation evaluated vessels for the mixed multihull class at the 2016 Olympic Sailing Regatta. The Viper came second out of seven boats evaluated, losing to the Nacra 17.

Technical data
Designer	Greg Goodall
Length 5.0 m / 16.4 ft
Beam	2.5 m / 8.2 ft
Weight	129 kg / 284 lb
Mast Height	8.5 m / 28 ft
Main Sail	15 m^{2} / 162 ft^{2}
Jib	3.7 m^{2} / 40 ft^{2}
Spinnaker	17.5 m^{2} / 188 ft^{2}
Builder	AHPC

== See also ==
- List of multihulls
