= Nacra 20 =

Sailboat class

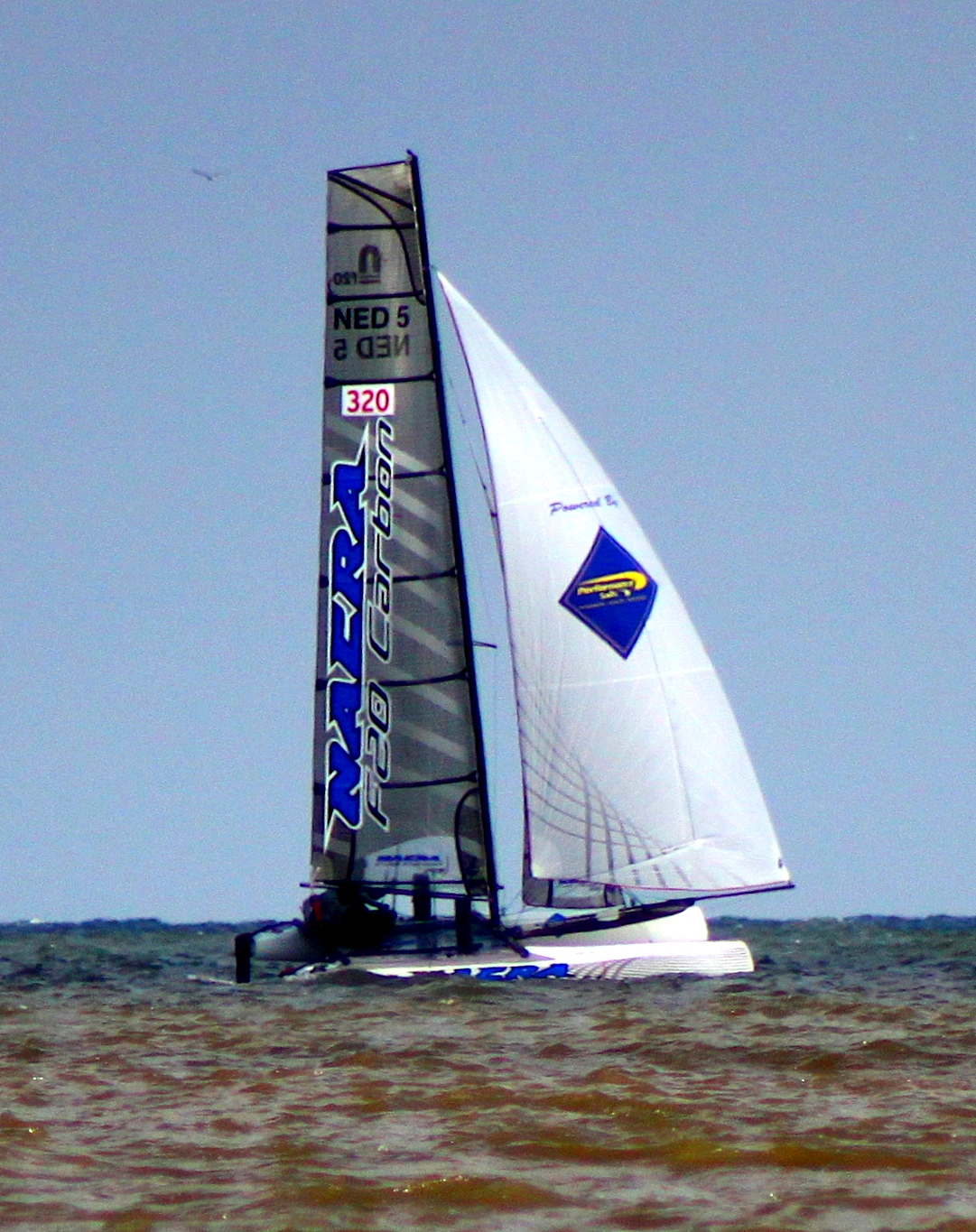
- Nacra F20 Carbon

Development
- Designer: Gino Morrelli and Pete Melvin
- Location: Netherlands
- Year: 1998
- Builders: Performance Catamarans; Nacra Sailing
- Role: One-design racer
- Name: Nacra 20

Boat
- Crew: Two
- Displacement: 390 lb (177 kg)
- Draft: 3.18 ft (0.97 m) with the daggerboards down

Hull
- Type: catamaran
- Construction: Glassfibre foam sandwich
- LOA: 20.00 ft (6.10 m)
- Beam: 8.50 ft (2.59 m)

Hull appendages
- Keel: twin daggerboards
- Rudder: twin transom-mounted rudders

Rig
- Rig type: Bermuda rig

Sails
- Sailplan: Fractional rigged sloop
- Mainsail area: 206 sq ft (19.1 m^{2})
- Jib/genoa area: 50 sq ft (4.6 m^{2})
- Spinnaker area: 269 sq ft (25.0 m^{2})
- Total sail area: 256 sq ft (23.8 m^{2})

The Nacra 20 is a catamaran sailing dinghy that was designed by Gino Morrelli and Pete Melvin as a one-design racer and first built in 1998.

The design is a development of the Nacra F18 Infusion, using the same rudders, mast, inter-hull beams and other small parts and fittings, but with new, longer hulls.

The design was originally marketed by the manufacturer as the Nacra Inter 20 and later as the Nacra 20, more recently it has been developed into the Nacra F20 Carbon and the hydrofoil-equipped Nacra F20 Carbon FCS.

The Nacra F20 Carbon is a recognized World Sailing international competition class.

== Production ==
The design was initially built by Performance Catamarans in Santa Ana, California, United States, but that company is out of business. Since 2007 the design has been built by Nacra Sailing in Scheveningen, Netherlands, and it remains in production as the Nacra F20 Carbon and Nacra F20 Carbon FCS models.

== Design ==
The Nacra 20 is a racing catamaran sailboat. All models have fractional sloop rigs with rotating masts, vertical transoms, transom-hung rudders controlled by a tiller and retractable daggerboards. They are normally sailed by a crew of two and the design is equipped with two trapezes for balance.

== Variants ==
Nacra 20
This model was introduced in 1998 as the Nacra Inter 20 and later called the Nacra 20. Production of this model ended after three years, in 2001. The hulls are built from a fibreglass foam sandwich. It has a length overall of 20.00 ft (6.1 m), a beam of 8.50 ft (2.6 m) and displaces 390 lb (177 kg). The hulls have plumb stems and a draft of 3.18 ft (0.97 m) with the daggerboards extended and 0.42 ft (0.13 m) with them retracted, allowing beaching or ground transportation on a trailer.
Nacra F20 Carbon
The hulls on this model are built predominantly from a carbon fibre foam sandwich with epoxy resin. It has a length overall of 20.25 ft (6.2 m), a beam of 10.42 ft (3.2 m) and displaces 401 lb (182 kg). The hulls have reverse raked stems and the rudders are a "kick-up" design. The rudders and daggerboards are made from pre-preg carbon fibre. The spinnaker is made from nylon.
Nacra F20 Carbon FCS (Flight Control System)
This sailing hydrofoil model commenced production in 2014. It shares most of its parts with the Nacra F20 Carbon, including hulls built predominantly from a carbon fibre foam sandwich with epoxy resin. It has a length overall of 20.25 ft (6.2 m), a beam of 10.42 ft (3.2 m) and displaces 445 lb (202 kg). The hulls have reverse raked stems. The pre-preg carbon fibre hydrofoil daggerboards and rudders are unique to this model. The daggerboards are L-shaped and the rudders T-shaped. The spinnaker is made from polyester.

== Operational history ==
In a 2012 review of the Nacra 20 Carbon in Sail magazine, reviewer Jeremy Evans wrote, "the Nacra 20 Carbon is a spectacular new one-design that is very light—20 pounds lighter than the smaller Formula 18—very stiff and very powerful, with its all-carbon wave-piercing hulls and a superb carbon/Kevlar mainsail ... Sailing in a light to moderate breeze, I found the boat to be stable, predictable and effortlessly quick .. All in all, this is a beautiful boat capable of blistering speed and a truly thrilling ride in a wide range of conditions."

== See also ==
- List of sailing boat types
- List of multihulls
