= Nacra 5.2 =

Sailboat class

- 5.2 Class symbol

Development
- Designer: Tom Roland
- Location: United States
- Year: 1975
- No. built: 2600
- Builder: Nacra Sailing
- Role: One-design racer
- Name: Nacra 5.2

Boat
- Crew: two
- Displacement: 350 lb (159 kg)
- Draft: 2.50 ft (0.76 m) with the daggerboards down

Hull
- Type: Catamaran
- Construction: Fiberglass
- LOA: 17.00 ft (5.18 m)
- Beam: 8.00 ft (2.44 m)

Hull appendages
- Keel: twin daggerboards
- Rudder: twin transom-mounted rudders

Rig
- Rig type: Bermuda rig

Sails
- Sailplan: Fractional rigged sloop
- Mainsail area: 170 sq ft (16 m^{2})
- Jib/genoa area: 50 sq ft (4.6 m^{2})
- Total sail area: 220 sq ft (20 m^{2})

Racing
- D-PN: 72.0

The Nacra 5.2 is an American catamaran sailing dinghy that was designed by Tom Roland as a one-design racer and first built in 1975. Other than the small production run Nacra 36, the Nacra 5.2 was the first Nacra brand boat and established its reputation.

The Nacra 5.2 design was superseded by the Nacra 5.5 in the company's product line in 1979.

== Production ==
The design was built by Nacra Sailing in the United States. A total of 2600 were built during its ten-year production run from 1975 until 1985, but it is now out of production.

== Design ==
The Nacra 5.2 is a recreational sailboat, built predominantly of fiberglass. It has a fractional sloop rig with a rotating mast, anodized aluminum spars and nine full mainsail sail battens. The symmetrical hulls have plumb stems, reverse transoms, transom-hung fiberglass rudders controlled by a tiller and retractable fiberglass daggerboards. The boat displaces 350 lb (159 kg).

The boat has a draft of 2.50 ft (0.76 m) with the dual daggerboards extended and 6 in (15 cm) with them retracted, allowing beaching or ground transportation on a trailer.

For sailing the design is equipped with trapezes to allow the crew to balance the boat. The design includes on-water adjustment controls for the shroud tensions, outhaul, jib luff and mainsail downhaul.

The design has a Portsmouth Yardstick racing average handicap of 72.0 and is normally raced with a crew of two sailors.

== Operational history ==
In a 1994 review Richard Sherwood wrote, "the hulls are wide at the bottom and narrow at the top to create extra buoyancy ... In spite of the high aspect ratio, the center of effort is low."

By 1994 there were racing fleets established in Australia, Europe, Japan and the United States.

== See also ==
- List of sailing boat types
- List of multihulls

Similar sailboats

- Hobie 17
