= International Catamaran Challenge Trophy =

The International Catamaran Challenge Trophy is the formal name for the match racing series between two catamarans familiarly known the Little America's Cup. While a championship series sailed between C Class catamarans does still exist, it is no longer known as the Little America's Cup.

Loosely modelled on the America's Cup series for yachts, it started in 1961 after UK catamaran designer Rod Mcalpine-Downie became aware of a challenge from America that claimed they had "the fastest sailboat". Rod answered the challenge and simple rules were agreed. The challenge had to come from a recognized yacht club and consequently was taken up by John Fisk on behalf of the Chapman Sands Yacht Club of which he was Commodore and friend of Rod. The challenge was successful and the trophy went to the UK where it stayed for 8 years.

The simple design rules were formalised, overall length of 25 feet (7.6 m), beam of 14 feet (4.3 m) and total sail area of 300 square feet (28 m^{2}) to be sailed by a two-man crew. These formed the basis of the rules for the International C-Class Catamaran.

== History ==
The story of the races goes back to 1959 when the American periodical "Yachting" sponsored a 'One of a Kind' regatta. The most successful catamaran in this event was "Tigercat" designed by Bob Harris of New York, which was considered by many to be the best in the world. In Great Britain, John Fisk, together with Rod Macalpine-Downie, had won the R.Y.A. 'One of a Kind' series with their Thai Mk IV. Downey and Fisk considered their boat superior to the upstart Americans, and thought that, as far as catamaran design was concerned, "the old world could still show the new world a thing or two". A friendly challenge was issued, and the format's similarity to the America's Cup resulted in the competition's unofficial nickname: the 'Little America's Cup'.

The early years saw major participation from amateur designers including Rodney March, who went on to design the Tornado which was adopted as an Olympic class for competition. His most radical contribution at that time was a wing mast/soft sail combination una-rig which was untouchable particularly in light airs. The superior wing-sails subsequently became a major design focus of the class, and the C Class has been one of the only proving grounds for wing-sail development and racing.

In 1963, the Australian Catamaran Association which represented some 8 catamaran classes in that country challenged through the Sandringham YC in Melbourne. Five C Class cats were built and trials were held in May at the Blairgowrie Yacht Squadron on Melbourne's southern Phillip Bay.

Two C Class were chosen to go to Thorpe Bay YC for the match, and the Australian team of six were John Munns, skipper; Graeme Anderson, crew; Max Press, Manager; John Tayor and Peter Scarfe, Reserve Crew; and Albert Smith as Observer. The two cats were Quest (Cunningham design) and Matilda (Jourbert and Hooks design). After trials on Thorpe Bay, Munns chose Quest as challenger. Both of these cats were innovative in construction: Quest was constructed from honeycombed cardboard shells with light terylene cloth drawn over and spray painted with reinforced hulls with frames, and Matilda was constructed from moulded balsa wood panels [citation needed].

Early wings include the Patient Lady designs by Dave Hubbard and Duncan McLane, the Edge series by Lindsey Cunningham, and the very early wing sails found on the Hellcat series. The solid wingsail used by "Oracle" in the 2010 America's Cup successful challenge, and the AC45 and AC72s rely heavily on developments pioneered by the C Class community.

Interest in the Cup waned in the UK when "Thunder" failed to gain the right to defend the challenge against the Australian, "Quest" in 1965. The decision to continue with the aging "Emma Hamilton" and Reg White, sponsored by A.R.(Bertie) Holloway almost cost the UK the Cup then. Only the brilliance of Reg White kept him level with Quest and in the final decider, with the Australian challenger in the lead a strong squall caught Quest on a broad reach and she capsized.

White and Holloway went on to develop the wing and soft sail combo for Lady Helmsman (currently located at the National Maritime Museum Cornwall), sponsored by the paint company but by now the "amateurs" had dropped out. The best thing to happen to the Cup was loss to Denmark and then their subsequent loss to Australia. Challenges between Australia and America continued for several years and during this time the solid Wing mast gained supremacy.

In the late 1990s and early 2000s, Sea Cliff Yacht Club, (the owners of the physical trophy and official stewards of the event) lost interest in collaborating with the C Class, which appeared to be dying, and chose to change the format of the event known as the Little America's Cup. Thus the 'Little America's Cup' and the actual C Class Catamaran Association parted ways. After negotiations with America's Cup Properties Ltd (owners of the America's Cup trademark) Sea Cliff kept the right to host an event known as the Little America's Cup, which they chose to be sailed in a one design F-18HT Beach Catamaran fleet. The C Class, opting instead to develop a new event, now competes in the International C Class Catamaran Championship. The C Class retains the right to refer to past and historic events which were, at the time, known as the Little America's Cup by their colloquial name, but current and future events are no longer associated with the Little America's Cup title.

== Race results of the original series ==
Races dwindled. They were held 12 times between 1961 and 1973, eight times between 1974-1989 and only twice in the old C Class format since 1989.

Year	Winner, Crew and Nation	Opponent, Crew and Nation	Match score	Match Location
1961	Hellcat II, John Fisk, Rod McAlpine-Downey UK	Wildcat, John Beery & John Hickok, USA	4:1	Long Island Sound, MA (USA)
1962	Hellcat, Ian Norris & Nocky Pope, UK	Beverly, Billy Saltonstall & Van Alan Clark, USA	4:1	Seacliff YC, USA
1963	Hellcat III S, Reg White & Rod Mac Alpine Downie, UK	Quest, John Munns (Skipper) & Graeme Anderson, Manager Max Press, Reserve Crew John Taylor and Peter Scarfe Representing The Australian Catamaran Assoc, Albert Smith-Observer and sponsored by the Sandringham YC, Victoria, Australia	4:0	Thorpe Bay YC Essex UK
1964	Emma Hamilton, A. R. Holloway & Reg White, Chapman Sands SC, UK	Sea Lion, Bob Smith & Jerry Hubbard, Eastern Multihull Association, USA	4:1	Thorpe Bay Yacht Club, UK
1965	Emma Hamilton, Reg White, UK	Quest II, Australia, Lindsay Cunningham and John Buzaglo, Representing Blairgowrie Yacht Squadron, Victoria, Australia	4:3	Thorpe Bay Yacht Club, UK;
1966	Lady Helmsman, UK	Gamecock, Bob Shiels & Jim Bonney, USA	4:2	Thorpe Bay UK
1967	Lady Helmsman, UK	Quest III, Australia Peter Bolton, Skipper	4:1	Thorpe Bay UK
1968	Lady Helmsman, UK	Yankee Flyer, USA		Thorpe Bay UK
1969	Opus III, Denmark	Ocelot, UK	4:3	
1970	Quest III, Australia	Sleipner, Denmark—Australian Crew- Bruce Proctor and Graham Candy		
1971				
1972	Quest III, Bruce Proctor, Graham Ainslie, Australia	Weathercock, Chuck Millican, Jack Evans, USA	4:0	Sorrento Sailing Club, Australia
1974	Miss Nylex, Australia Blairgowrie Yacht Squadron Crew Bruce Proctor and Graham Ainslie	Miss Stars New Zealand - West Coast Canterbury Syndicate From Canterbury Catamaran Squadron. Designer and Crew Bill Hende. Skipper Bret de Thier. Manager/Reserve Crew Wayne Nolan. - - NZ.	4:0	Sorrento Sailing Club, Victoria, Australia
1976	Aquarius V, Alex Kosloff and crew Robbie Harvey Cabrillo Beach YC, CA, USA	Miss Nylex, Sorrento Yacht Club in Australia, Bruce Proctor, Skipper and Graeme Ainslie	4:3	Sorrento Sailing Club, Victoria, Australia
1977	Patient Lady III, USA	Quest, Australia	4:0	Roton Point Club, Rowayton, CT USA
1978	Patient Lady IV, USA	Miss Lancia, Italy	4:0	Roton Point Club, Rowayton, CT USA
1980	Patient Lady V, USA	Signor G (for Signor Gividi), Italy	4:0	Roton Point Club, Rowayton, CT USA
1982	Patient Lady V, USA	Signor G	4:0	Roton Point Club, Rowayton, CT USA
1985	Victoria 150, Australia	Patient Lady VI, USA		Roton Point Club, Rowayton, CT USA
1987	The Edge, Australia	The Hinge, UK		McCrae Yacht Club, Victoria, Australia
1989	The Edge II, Simon McKeon & David Churcher, Australia	Wingmill, USA		McCrae Yacht Club, Victoria, Australia
1991	The Edge III, Simon McKeon & David Churcher, Australia	Freedom's Wing, Pete Melvin and Steve Rosenberg, USA	4:1	McCrae Yacht Club, Victoria, Australia
1996	Cogito, Duncan MacLane; USA	Yellow Pages The Edge III, Australia	4:0	McCrae Yacht Club, Victoria, Australia
1997 onwards	No races held in this format under this name. Please see ICCC from this point forward			

While the ICCT has changed in format, C Class match racing continues on with the International C-Class Catamaran Championship, and the race results continue there.

== See also ==
- America's Cup
- “New” Little America's Cup
