= Hobie Wildcat =

Sailboat class

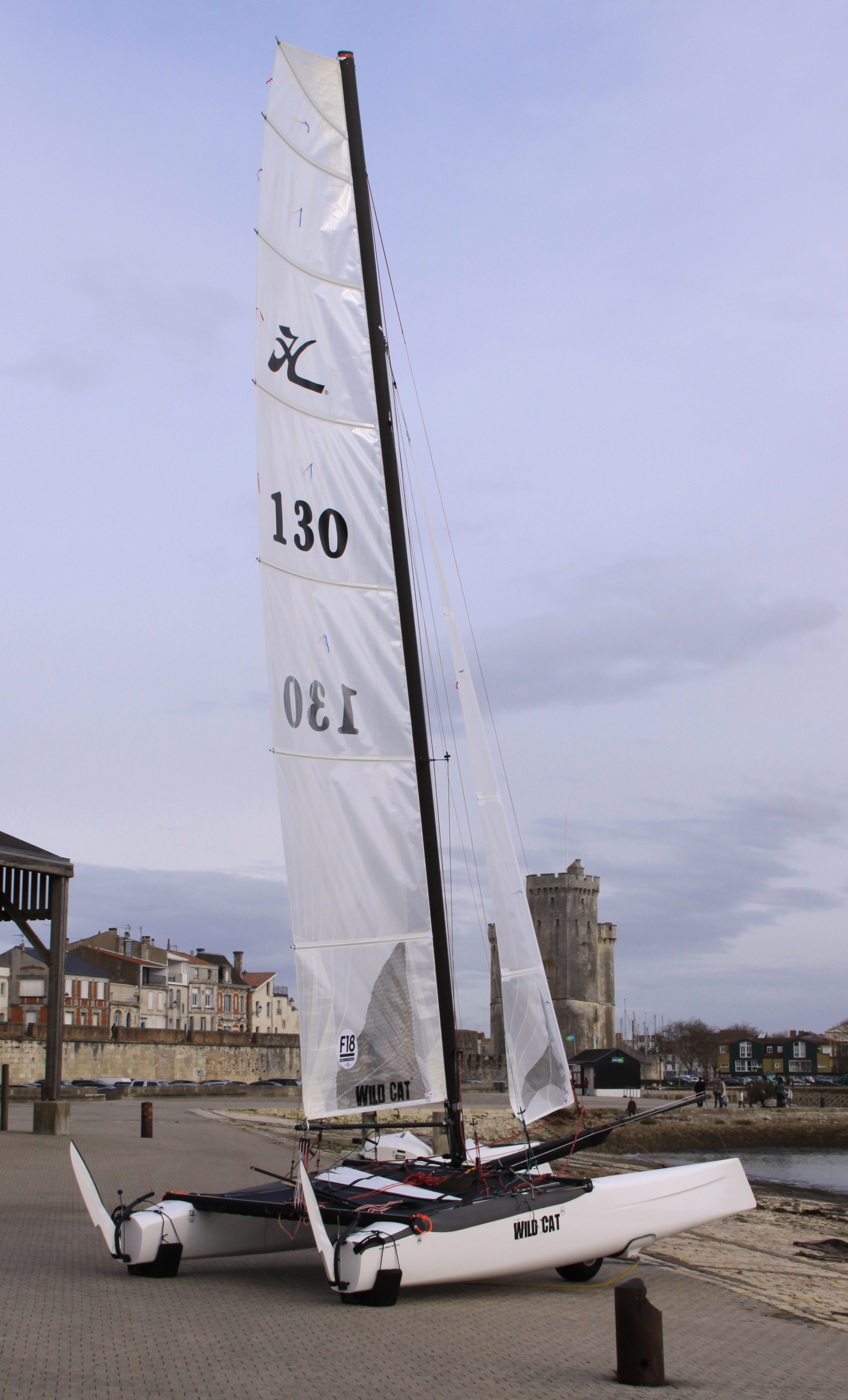
- A WildCat under sail

Development
- Designer: Dr. Martin Fischer
- Year: 2009
- Design: One-Design
- Role: Racing

Boat
- Crew: 2
- Trapeze: Double

Hull
- Type: Multihull
- Construction: Fiberglass molding sandwich-structured composite
- Hull weight: 180 kilograms (400 lb)
- LOA: 5.46 metres (17 ft 11 in)
- Beam: 2.59 metres (8 ft 6 in)

Hull appendages
- Keel: Centerboard

Rig
- Rig type: Bermuda
- Mast height: 9 metres (29 ft 6 in)

Sails
- Mainsail area: 17 square metres (180 sq ft)
- Jib/genoa area: 4.15 square metres (44.7 sq ft)
- Spinnaker area: 21 square metres (230 sq ft)
- Upwind sail area: 21.15 square metres (227.7 sq ft)

Racing
- Class association: Formula 18

The Hobie Wildcat is a Formula 18 developed by Hobie Cat Europe as a one-design within the Formula 18 rules. The class was recognised by the International Sailing Federation in November 2010. It is designed to replace the Hobie Tiger as a more up to date and competitive design within the Formula 18 fleet.

== See also ==
- List of multihulls
