= Nacra Sailing =

Sailboat manufacturer

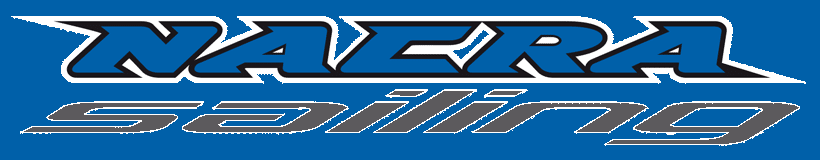
- Type: Privately held company
- Industry: Boat building
- Founded: 1975
- Founder: Tom Roland
- Headquarters: Scheveningen, Netherlands
- Products: Catamarans
- Website: www.nacrasailing.com

Nacra Sailing is a Dutch company that manufactures a line of small catamaran sailboats, or beachcats. NACRA was founded in 1975 to tap into the market created by Hobie Alter the founder of Hobie Cat, and several other companies offering small fiberglass catamarans designed to be sailed off the beach by a crew of one or two.

NACRA is an acronym that stands for North American Catamaran Racing Association, and as the name implies, the company has remained primarily focused on racing catamarans from inception.

== History ==
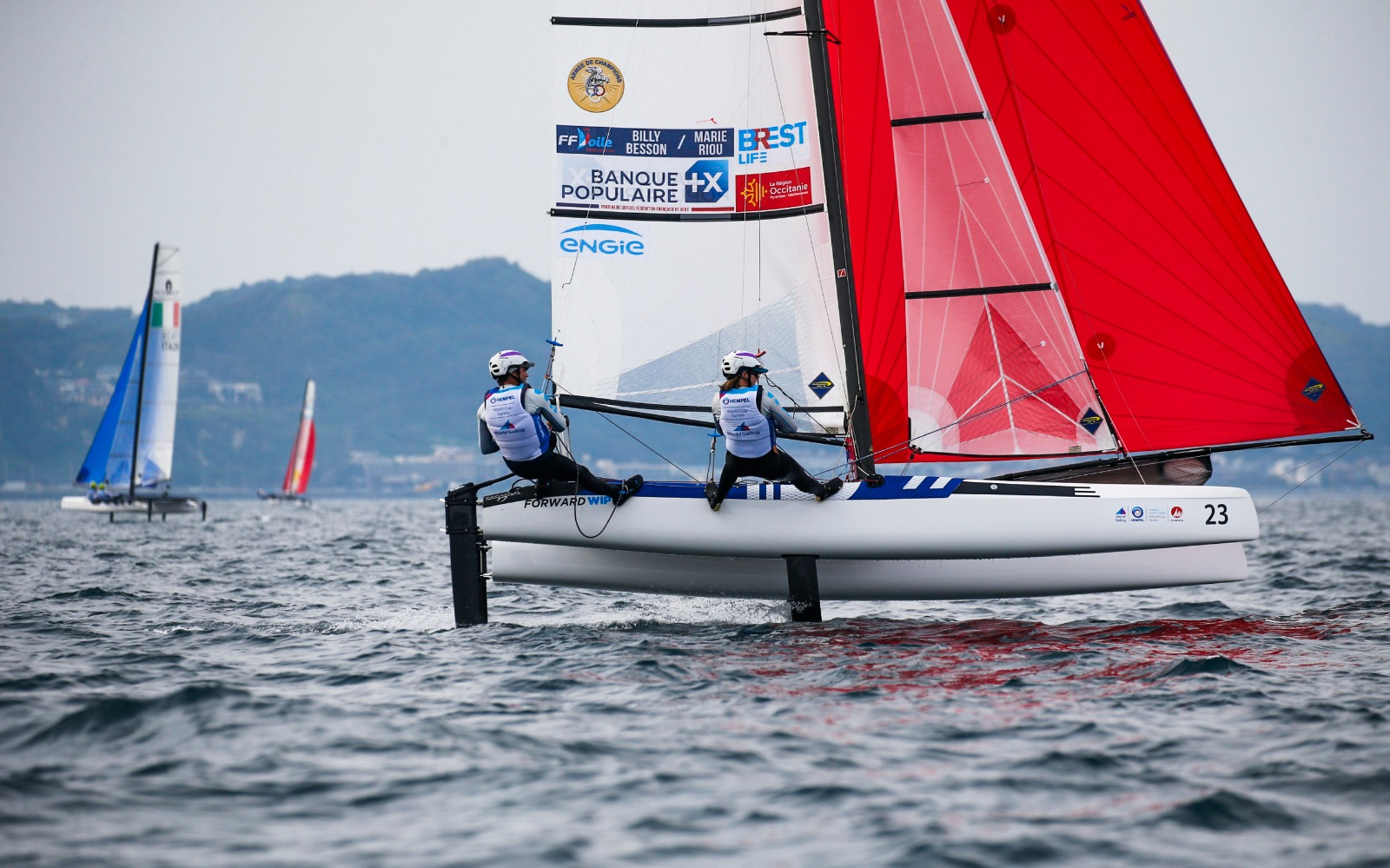
Nacra 17

Nacra Sailing was founded by sailboat designer Tom Roland who had previously designed the Alpha Cat, an 18-foot beach cat, in 1970. After this he designed a 36-foot, oversized one design beach catamaran as part of venture to start a professional sailboat racing series. About 10 of these were built, but the racing series didn't turn out to be viable. The racing series was the original source of the NACRA acronym (North American Catamaran Racing Association), which was carried over when he decided to build a scaled down and more commercial version of his big one-design racer.

In 1975 he launched the new company with the Nacra 5.2, a 17-foot beach cat, which was an unusual design that featured plumb bows, daggerboards, and a highly tunable sail plan with a fully battened loose-footed main sail. Many of the design elements of this first boat were carried over to the later designs as well as becoming common on other performance oriented catamarans.

The company has undergone several ownership and name changes over the years and acquired the competing Prindle brand in 1988. At that time, it operated under the name Performance Catamarans Inc. and relocated from Santa Barbara to Santa Ana, California. In 2007, the company was acquired by a group in the Netherlands and today operates as Nacra Sailing. Australian based licensed builder Incara Pty Ltd, owned by Bob Forbes, built boats under license from 1979 until 1986 and was based in Sydney.

Nacra Sailing's 20 foot boats dominated the Worrell 1000, a race The New York Times described as "A Tour d'France on the Water", throughout the 1990s, and were selected as only the second one-design for the race in 2001.

In 2012 Nacra Sailing won the design competition held by World Sailing, the world governing body for the sport of sailing recognized by the International Olympic Committee and the International Paralympic Committee, for a new Olympic racing catamaran, the Nacra 17, which was used in the new for 2016 Olympic Mixed Multihull class, which requires one male and one female sailor per boat. In 2017 it was announced that a modified version of the boat with foiling capability will be used in the Tokyo 2020 Olympics.

In 2015 the Nacra 15 was adopted by World Sailing as a Youth World Championships class, as well as a new class for the Youth Olympic Games. In 2016 British RYA selected the Nacra 15 as their new Youth Multihull boat, as well.

Recent catamarans built by Nacra Sailing have included rudders and daggerboards shaped to facilitate hydofoiling at higher speeds, among the first commercial sail boats to offer this feature.

== Current and notable past models ==
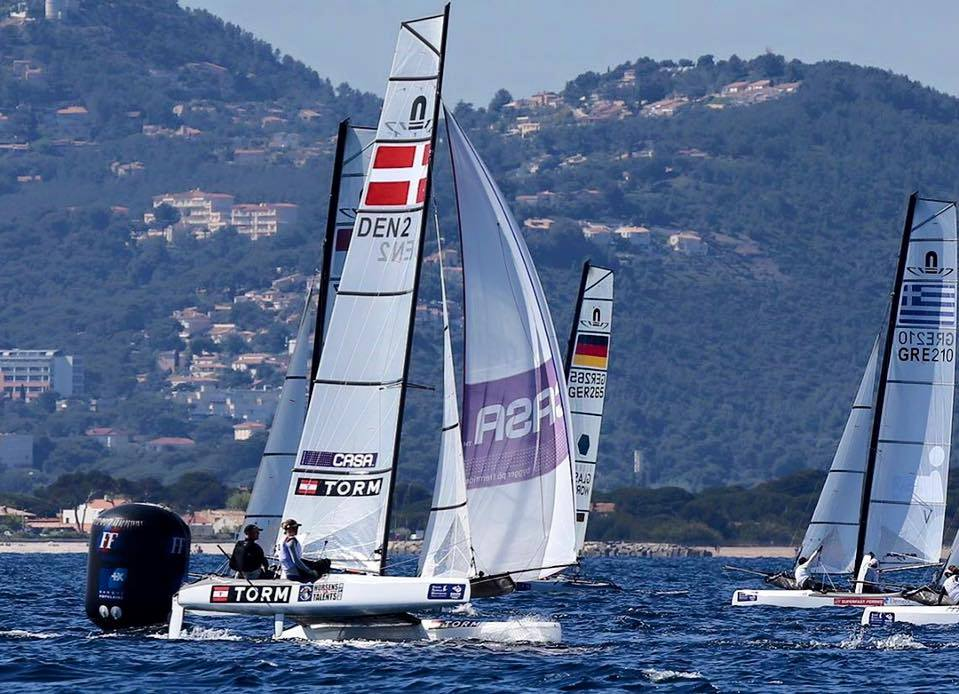
Nacra 17

Nacra 4.5

Model	Length	Beam	Weight	Intro year	Current production	crew	Description	Designer
NACRA 5.2	17'	8.2'	350 lbs	1975	no	2	distinctive plumb bow	Tom Roland
NACRA Blast	16'	8'	350 lbs	2001	no	2	designed at ISAF Youth Catamaran	Nacra and Alian Comyn
NACRA 36	36.75'	16'		1975	no	3+	only 10 built	Tom Roland
NACRA 18 Square	18'	11'		1979	no	1	distinctive 11 foot beam, uni rig	Tom Roland
NACRA 5.5 Sloop	18'	8.5'		1984	no	2	same hulls as 18 Square	Tom Roland
NACRA 5.5 Uni	18'	8.5'		1984	no	1	same hulls as 18 Square	Tom Roland
NACRA 4.5	14.8'	7.7'		1991	no	1 or 2	boardless, boomless main	Nacra
NACRA 450 MK²	15'	8.2'	286 lbs	2026	yes	1 or 2	Recreational, no boards, boomless mainsail and jib, optional spinnaker	Nacra
NACRA 5.0	16.4	8.'		1985	no	2	boardless, boomless main	Roy Seaman
NACRA 5.7	18.5	8.5'	375 lbs	1984	no	2	boardless, boomless main	Roy Seaman
NACRA 5.8	19'	8'	390 lbs	1982	no	2	large 1 design fleet	Roy Seaman
NACRA 6.0	20'	8.5'		1988	no	2	designed for Worrell 1000	Roy Seaman
NACRA Inter F17	17'	8'			no	1	Unirig with spinnaker sloop with spinnaker	Nacra
NACRA Inter 18	18'	8.5'		1995	no	2	Nacra's 1st Formula 18	Morrelli & Melvin
NACRA Inter 20	20'	8.5'	410 lbs		no	2	Worrell 1000 one-design, 2001	Nacra
Nacra Inter 20 MK²	20.3'	8.5'	407 lbs	2026	yes	2	New generation One-design 20ft	Nacra and Morrelli & Melvin
NACRA F-18	18'	8.5'		2001	no	2	Nacra's 2nd Formula 18	Nacra and Alian Comyn
NACRA F-18 Infusion	18'	8.5'		2005	yes	2	Nacra's 3rd Formula 18, three different generations were produced, including a convertible full foiling version	Nacra and Morrelli & Melvin
NACRA F-18 Evolution	18'	8.5'		2020	yes	2	Nacra's 4th Formula 18	Nacra and Morrelli & Melvin
NACRA F16	16'	8.5'		2011	yes	1 or 2	Formula 16	Nacra and Morrelli & Melvin
NACRA 17 MK1	17'	8.2'		2012	no	2	Mixed Multihull for 2016 Olympics, curved boards, non-foiling	Nacra and Morrelli & Melvin
NACRA 17 MK²	17'	8.2'		2017	yes	2	Olympic Mixed Multihull from 2020, full foiling	Nacra and Morrelli & Melvin
NACRA 15	15'	7.7'		2015	yes	2	ISAF Youth Multihull from 2016	Nacra and Morrelli & Melvin
NACRA F20 Carbon	20.3'	10.5'	401 lbs	2010	yes	2	C-board, Skimming design with kick up rudders, Not Formula 20 compliant	Nacra and Morrelli & Melvin
NACRA F20 Carbon FCS	20.3'	10.5'	445 lbs	2014	yes	2	Full foiling design with J-boards and T-foil rudders	Nacra and Morrelli & Melvin
NACRA 460	14.8'	7.7'		2004	no	na	Recreational, no boards, mainsail and jIb	Nacra
NACRA 500	16.4'	8'		1998	no	na	Recreational, no boards, mainsail and jIb	Nacra
NACRA 570	18.5'	8'		1998	no	na	Recreational, no boards, mainsail and jIb	Nacra
Nacra 500 MK²	16.5'	8.2'	319 lbs	2022	yes	1 or 2	Recreational, no boards, boomless mainsail and jib, optional spinnaker	Nacra
Nacra 570 MK²	18.4'	8.2'	364 lbs	2023	yes	2	Recreational, no boards, boomless mainsail and jib, optional spinnaker	Nacra

== See also ==
- List of multihulls
