= International A-class catamaran =

Competitive catamaran class

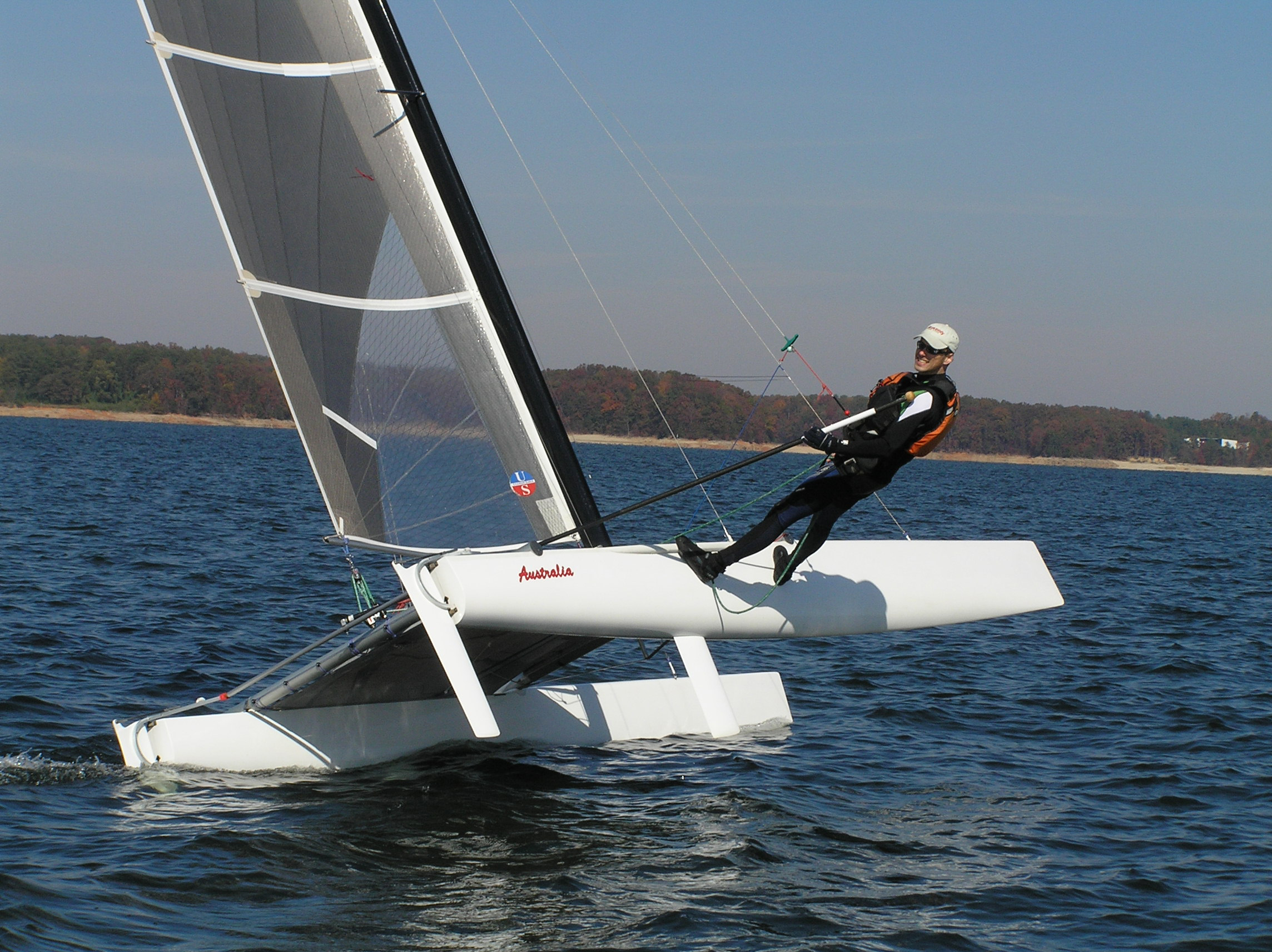
The A-Class Catamaran

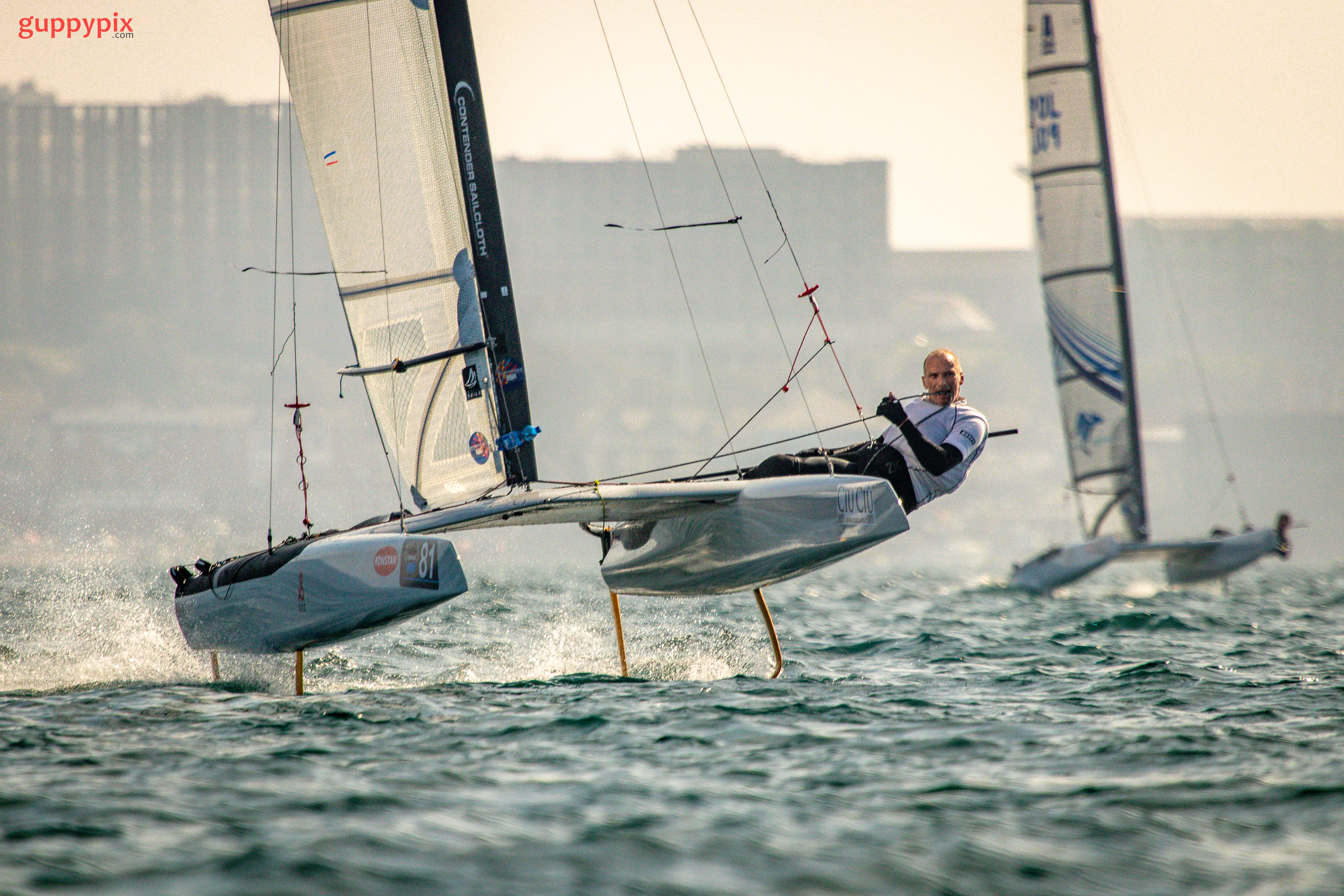

The A-Class Catamaran, often abbreviated to A-Cat, is a development class sailing catamaran for singlehanded racing.

== Background ==
The class was founded during the late 1950s and was part of the 4-tier IYRU (now World Sailing) approach to divide up the sports catamaran sailing scene into 4 separate groups. These A, B, C and D classes were governed by a very small set of class rules to which each design had to comply. In the beginning it was just:

- Maximum hull length
- Maximum overall width
- Maximum sailarea

All boats designed and built to these specs would be grouped into one fleet and race each other for crossing the finish line first.

The A-Class is the largest remaining of the four original classes. The B-Class was a 20-foot two-person catamaran with 235 square feet of sail and later evolved into the Tornado class and related designs such as the F18. The C-class, another two-person catamaran, was 25 feet long with a sail area of 300 square feet and has become a highly developed development class that competes for the Little America’s Cup. The D-Class measured 32 feet, carried 500 square feet of sail, and was crewed by three people, but participation in the class declined over time.

== Specifications ==
The official organisation for the A-Class catamaran is the IACA (International A division Catamarans Association).

The A-Class rules were expanded over time to prevent the cost of these boats from rising too high and to ensure fairness in racing.

Currently the main A-Class rules are:

- Min overall boat weight : 75 kg / 165.3 lbs
- Max overall boat length : 5.49 m / 18.3 ft (= still the old IYRU rule)
- Max overall boat width : 2.30 m / 7.5 ft (= still the old IYRU rule)
- Max sail area incl. mast : 13.94 m^{2} / 150.0 ft^{2} (= still the old IYRU rule)

In handicap racing, the A-Class catamaran uses a Portsmouth Yardstick of 681 in the UK or a D-PN of 64.5 in the USA.

== Current situation ==
The A-Class design has over time converged to a single sail rig using a lightweight carbon mast of about 9 meters length and using lightweight pentex or Kevlar sailcloth. The hulls and beams are often made out of carbon fibre as well, although homebuilt wood or composite materials are still seen on the race circuits.

In the decades since their foundation, the A-Class has gathered a significant international following and it has class organisations in many countries around the globe. Their world championships often attracts around 100 boats and sailors. It is also a class that still contains a significant portion of homebuilders, although their numbers are decreasing with every year due to the skills required to make a competitive boat. However, nearly all A-Class sailors tinker with their setups and boats. As it is a developmental class and the rules do allow so much variation, it is paramount that a top sailor keeps experimenting with new setups and generally tries to improve the design even more. Because of this general character of the class, the A-Class is often leading over other catamaran classes in terms of design development. Over time these other classes copy new findings for their own setups. Examples of such developments are: the carbon mast, the squaretop mainsail, the wave-piercer hull design and in general the use of exotic materials.

In 2017 with the advent of practical foiling designs, the IACA divided the class into an Open (Foiling) division, and a non foiling Classic division for boats with straight or C-shaped foils, and with different class rules to prevent foiling. The two have slightly different SCHRS handicaps, the Open being 0.978, the Classic being 1.008. This allows close racing to continue, and many older boats are still competitive on the Classic circuit particularly.

== Builders ==
Apart from the list below of some of the commercial builders, the A-Class catamaran can be home-built:

- Bimare (Italy) (https://web.archive.org/web/20120823064200/http://www.bimare.org/)
- Aicher-Egner Technologie GmbH (Germany) (http://www.flyer-acat.de/)
- Marstrom (Composite AB Sweden) (https://www.marstrom.com/)
- Scheurer Design & Eng. (Switzerland) (https://web.archive.org/web/20130424015358/http://www.d3-a-cat.com/)
- Scheurer Bootswerft AG (Switzerland) (https://web.archive.org/web/20120705062433/http://www.scheurerwerft.ch/scheurer/)
- VectorWorks Sail (USA)
- Wingfox (Poland) (http://www.wingfox.pl/)
- DNA (Netherlands) (http://dnaperformancesailing.com/)
- Vision (Netherlands) (http://www.catamaranparts.nl/)
- Nikita (Germany)
- Exploder (Poland) (https://www.exploder.info/)

== Class websites ==
- International A-Division Catamaran Association (IACA) (https://www.a-cat.org)
- Australia ()
- Austria (http://www.aaca.at/)
- Belgium (https://www.baca.be)
- Brazil (https://web.archive.org/web/20131214165019/http://www.abca.esp.br/acat/default_por.asp)
- Denmark (http://www.a-cat.dk)
- Germany (http://www.a-cat.info)
- Great Britain (http://www.a-cat.co.uk)
- France (http://www.afcca.org)
- Italy (https://www.classeaitalia.it)
- New Zealand (http://www.a-class.org.nz)
- Netherlands ()
- Poland (http://www.katamaran.sopot.pl/aklasa.htm)
- Sweden (https://www.a-cat.se/)
- Switzerland (http://www.saca.ch)
- Spain (http://www.adecat.com)
- United States of America (https://www.usaca.info/)

== See also ==
- List of multihulls
- A-Cat World Championship
