= International C-Class Catamaran Championship =

The International C-Class Catamaran Championship, (ICCCC or I4C), is a match racing sailing competition featuring the highly innovative International C-Class Catamarans, predominantly with a wingsail rather than conventional sail plan.

It is the successor event to the International Catamaran Challenge Trophy, and like it, has always been colloquially known as the "little America's Cup", despite there being no actual connection to the America's Cup. This terminology has been contested as being trademark violation against America's Cup Properties Inc, but the name was common in use long before ACPI and its trademarks.

== Race results ==
International C Class Catamaran Championships
Year	Venue	Winner	Runner-up	Score
2004	Bristol	(United States) Cogito (USA–104); Steve Clark; Duncan Maclane	(United States) Patient Lady VI (USA–96); Lars Guck; Stan Schreyer	4–0
2007	Toronto	(Canada) Alpha (CAN–1); Fred Eaton; Magnus Clarke	(United States) Cogito (USA–1); Steve Clark; Duncan MacLean	5–0
2010	Newport	(Canada) Canaan (CAN–9); Fred Eaton; Magnus Clarke	(Australia) Alpha (AUS–1); Glenn Ashby; Jimmy Spithill	3–1
2013	Falmouth	(France) Groupama (FRA–1); Franck Cammas; Louis Viat	(Switzerland) Hydros Lombard Odier (SUI–1); Billy Besson; Jeremie Lagarrigue	2–0
2015	Geneva	(France) Groupama (FRA–007); Franck Cammas; Louis Viat	(Switzerland) Axon racing (SUI–104); Benoît Marie; Benoît Morelle	2–0

The 2013 ICCCC was held in Falmouth, Cornwall, UK. The event hosts were Team Invictus and the organising club was Restronguet Sailing Club , with shore facilities provided by Windsport International It was estimated that there were 10 teams and up to 16 competing boats. Teams are expected from Challenge Italia (Roberto Gripi), Team Hydros C Class Sailing (Switzerland) , USA (Steve Clark, Aethon & Cogito), Canada (reigning champion, Fred Eaton), Team Invictus UK, Team Cascais (Portugal), Challenge France (France) and Groupama (France).

The 2015 ICCCC was held on Lake Geneva in Geneva, Switzerland September 12-21.

== See also ==
- America's Cup
- International Catamaran Challenge Trophy
