= Formula 18 =

Catamaran class

F18
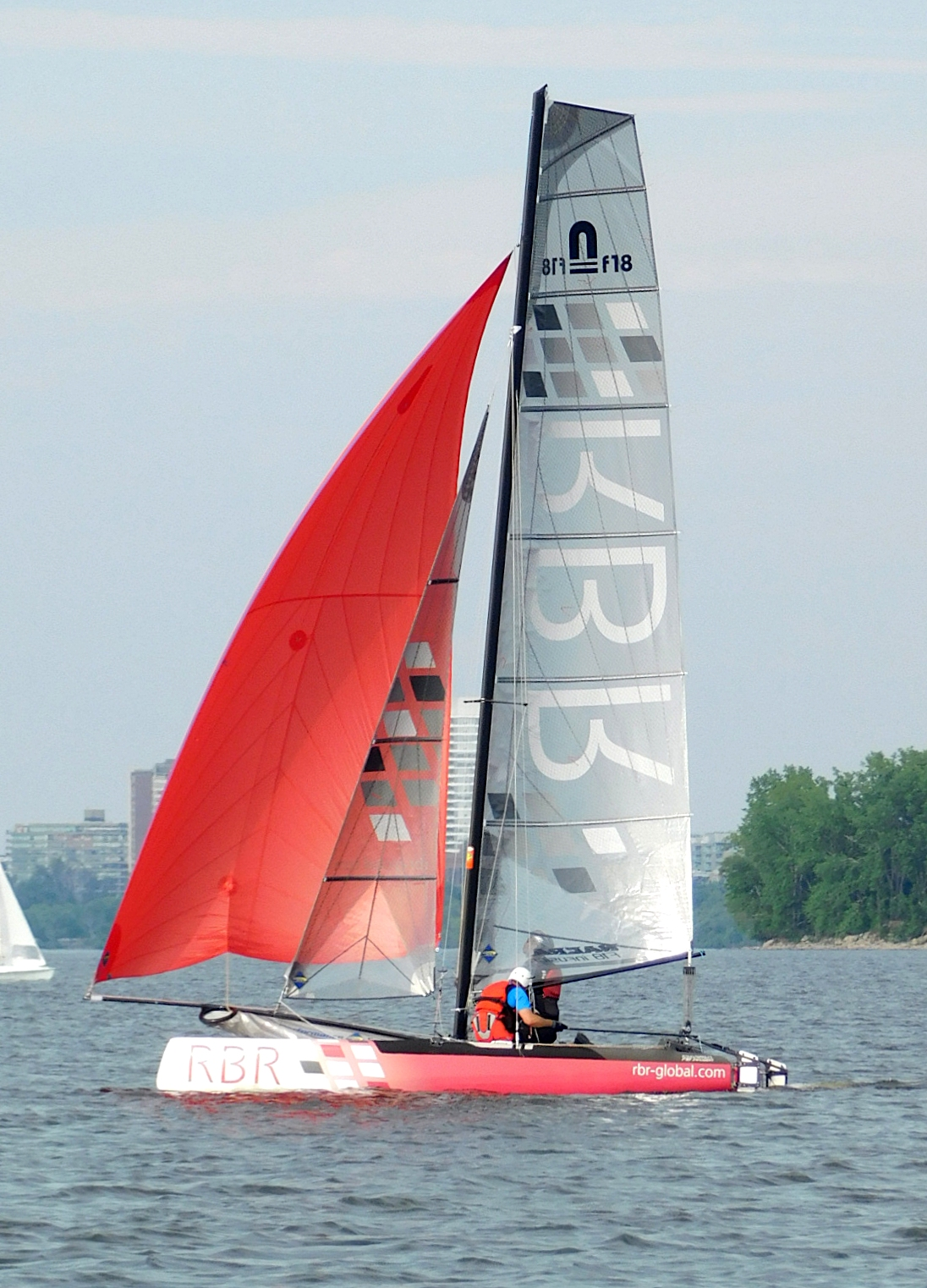

Development
- Designer: various
- Year: 1994
- Design: Box Rule
- Brand: various
- Builder: various

Boat
- Crew: 2 person
- Displacement: 180 kg (400 lb)
- Draft: 1.40 m (4 ft 7 in) (upwind)
- Trapeze: helm and crew

Hull
- Type: catamaran
- LOH: 5.52 m (18 ft 1 in)
- Beam: 2.60 m (8 ft 6 in)

Hull appendages
- Keel: optional: daggerboards / centerboards

Rig
- Mast height: 9.10 m (29 ft 10 in) (maximum)

Sails
- Mainsail area: 17 m^{2} (180 sq ft) (mainsail and mast combined area)
- Jib/genoa area: 4.3 m^{2} (46 sq ft)
- Gennaker area: 21 m^{2} (230 sq ft)
- Upwind sail area: 21.3 m^{2} (229 sq ft)
- Downwind sail area: 42.3 m^{2} (455 sq ft)

Racing
- Class association: International Formula 18 Class Association

The Formula 18 (F18) class is a non-foiling, restricted development, formula-design sport catamaran class. It was started in the early 1990s and quickly grew getting class recognition by World Sailing, with large racing fleets all over the globe.

== Design goals ==
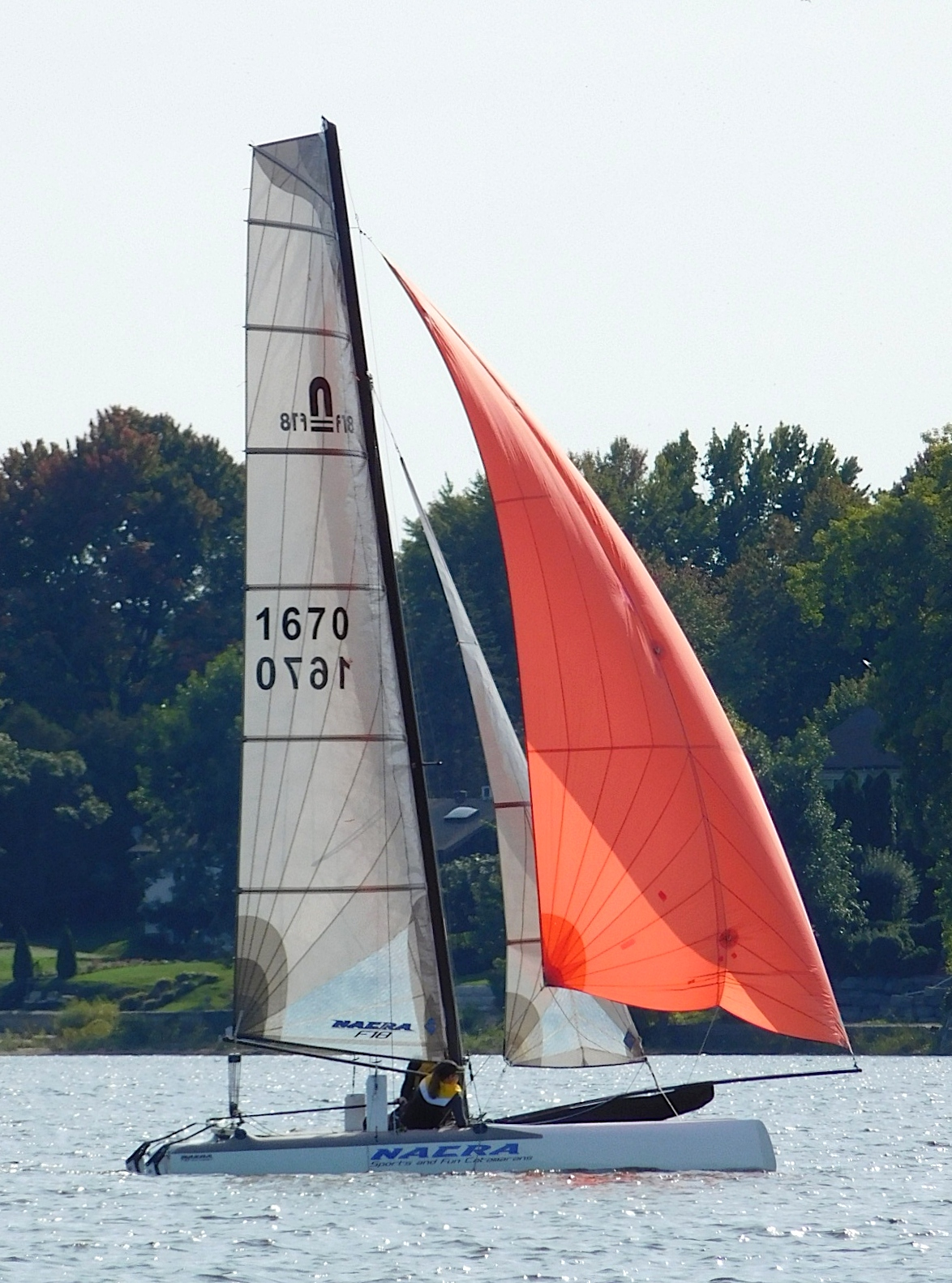
Formula 18 catamaran with gennaker

The objective of the class is to offer fair racing in 18-foot catamarans.

The F18 class is a "box rule" class, which means that any boat that adheres to the limited set of general design specifications may participate in all F18 races. This has led to a score of homebuilders and professional builders to design their own F18 boats and race them in this class. However, it is the mainstream production F18 designs that have dominated the top of the class. The presence of multiple boat builders and sailmakers in the class stimulates innovation and helps to limit costs to sailors.

The F18 box rule allows limited development, striking a balance between the class remaining close to the front edge of multihull design and preserving capital invested in the fleet. Since its introduction, the F18 has seen a steady evolution in both hull and sail shapes, which has led to remarkably improved performance in terms of both handling and speed. The latest innovation adoption was the introduction of the mainsail "decksweeper" at the 2017 Worlds. Crewed by experienced teams F18s can reach speeds of over 13 knots upwind and more than 20 knots downwind.

The relatively high boat weight facilitates robust construction and limits the benefits from fragile advanced construction techniques, keeping costs down and increasing longevity. It also supports adding interchangeable parts to the platform, for example for use of the platform as a foiling catamaran outside F18 racing. Moreover, the relatively high boat weight reduces the sensitivity of performance to crew weight.

The F18 class also uses an equalizing system, with crew extra weights, to offer competitive racing for a larger crew weight range.

== Class development ==
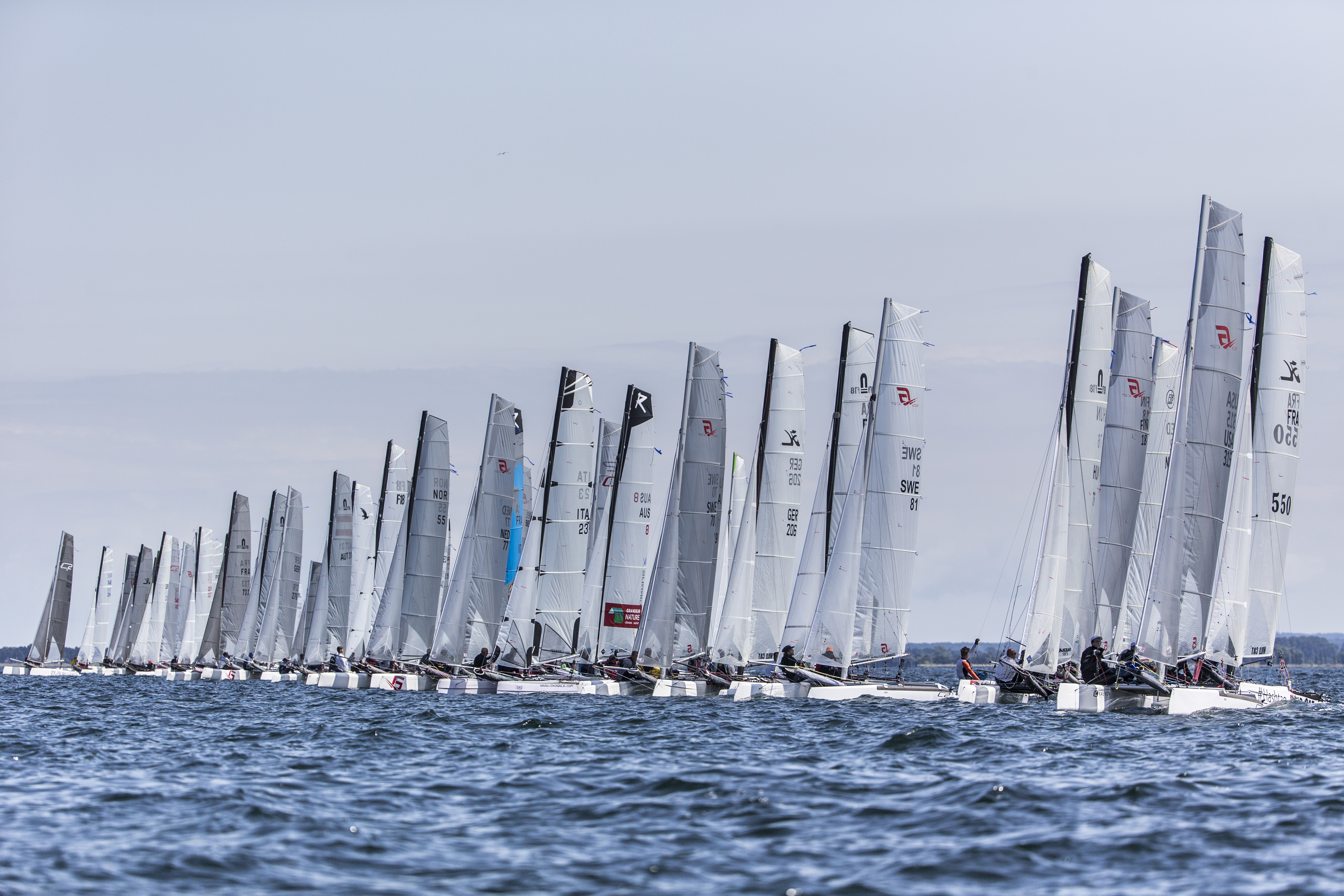
Starting line during 2015 F18 Worlds in Kiel

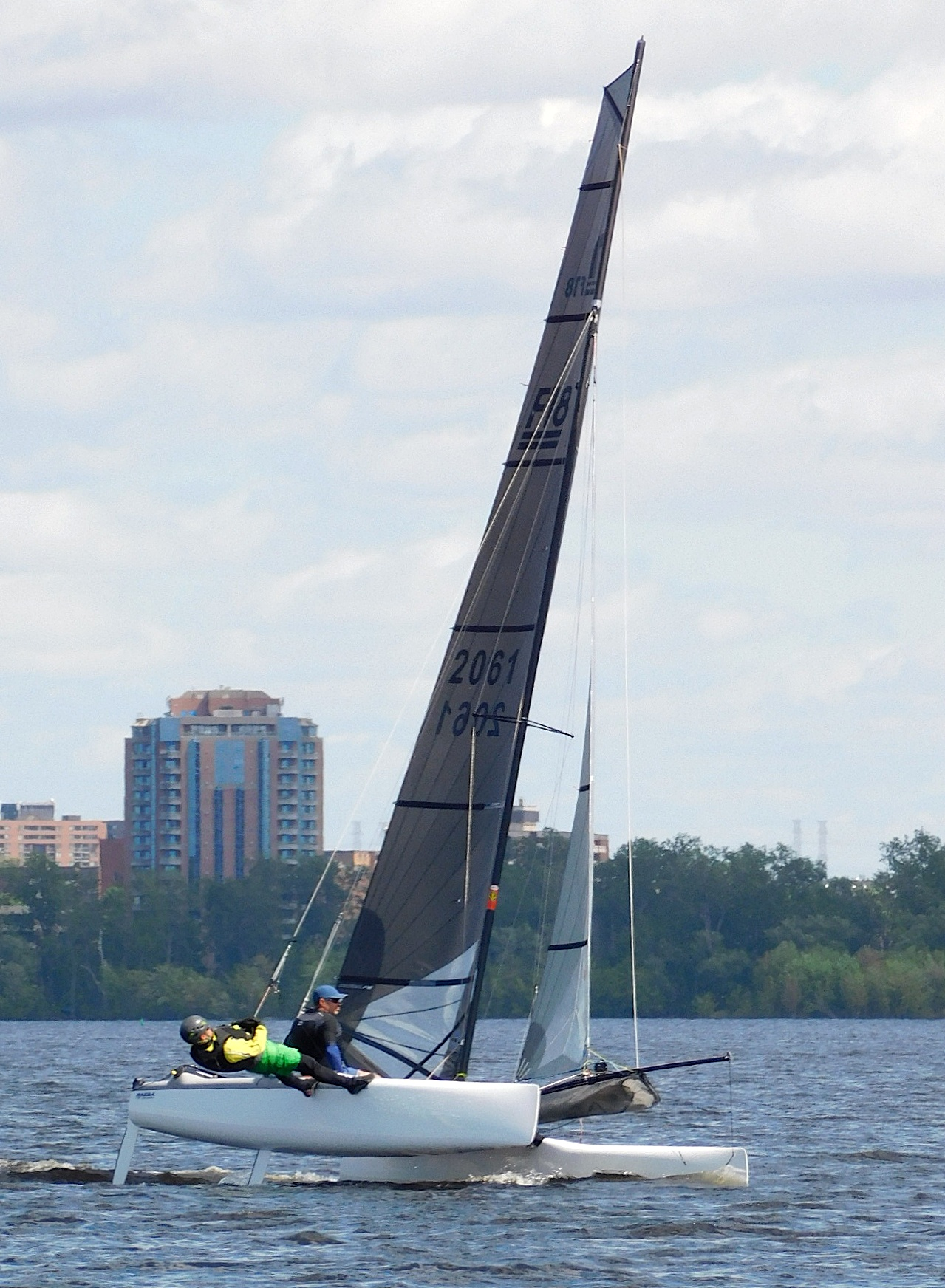
Formula 18 with one hull out of the water

In 1989 the ICCA rules were written by Yves Loday and Yves Pajot with the intention to create uniform rules. This didn't work due to the limited resources so in 1994 a revised concept and rules were development with the support of the FFV and in particular Olivier Bovyn and Pierre-Charles Barraud creating the Formula 18 class.

The class grew very quickly and due to its fast growth, the F18 attained World Sailing Recognised Class status already in 1996, within 18 months after its inception.

Mainly a Europe-based class at the beginning, class membership eventually spread to Australia and the Americas and the F18 class currently has full racing circuits in many places around the globe. Several thousand boats have been sold over the years. The F18 attracts both female and male as well as mixed crews and it is particularly popular among teams with combined crew weights of approximately 140–170 kg.

Its design and popularity has led the F18 to be the boat of choice for long-distance raid events such as the Stockholm Archipelago Raid, the Costarmoricaine, and the Worrell 1000.

The boats are equipped with double trapezes and a gennaker, and as a result, they require a skilled and physically fit crew to be competitive. However, many crews also use this catamaran for purely recreational sailing.

Over time the class has seen many sailors who also made their appearances in Olympic sailing classes, the America's Cup, Jules Verne Trophy and Volvo Ocean Race, including Carolijn Brouwer, Glenn Ashby, Darren Bundock, Jimmy Spithill, Mitch Booth and Franck Cammas.

The Formula 18 class is governed by the International Formula 18 Class Association and is recognized as a World Sailing Multihull Class.

The early success of the F18 class during the 1990s inspired the founding of the Formula 16 class. In addition, a number of Formula 18 designs have gone on to have competitive one-design racing including the Hobie Tiger, Hobie Wildcat and Nacra Infusion.

== Popular Designs ==
Design in bold are in production

Name	Years	Designer	Builder	No Built	Notes	Ref.
Alado 18		J. VALER	ALADO CAT			
Akurra	2021–Present	Goodall Design	Goodall			
AHPC C2	2010-2020	Greg Goodall	AHPC			
AHPC Capricorn	2004-2009	Greg Goodall; Martin Fischer	AHPC (AUS)			
AHPC Taipan		Greg Goodall	BOYER FIBERCRAFT (aus)			
Bimare HT		Michelangelo Petrucci				
Cirrus 18						
Cirrus R						
Cirrus R2						
Cirrus 901	2021–Present					
Diam 18			MULTI (FRA)			
eXploder Scorpion	2015–Present	Martín Vanzulli	eXploder (POL)			
Dart Hawk	1996 - 2000s	Reg White / Yves Loday	White Formula / Performance Sailcraft Europe (GBR)		Mass Produced	
Falcon						
Flash		MATTIA & CECCO				
Nacra Inter 18	90s-00s	Morelli & Melvin	PERFORMANCE CATAMARAN (USA)			
Nacra Inter 2	90s-00s	Alain Comyn	PERFORMANCE CATAMARAN (USA)			
Nacra F18 Infusion	2008		Nacra Sailing (NED)			
Nacra F18 Infusion MK2			Nacra Sailing (NED)		New Hull with dreadnaught bow	
Nacra F18 Infusion MK3			Nacra Sailing (NED)		Convertible to foiling	
Nacra F18 Evolution	2021–Present		Nacra Sailing			
Hobie Wildcat	2009	Martin Fischer	Hobie Cat Europe (FRA)			
Hobie Tiger	1995	J. Valer	Hobie Cat Europe (FRA)			
Hunter	1999-00s	Mischa Heemskerk	Twister Catamarans NL			
MV Challenge		Jacques Valer	Mediavoile / RLM Composite			
RaceCat MV18	2006		(ARG)			
Phantom						
Phenix						
Shockwave		Reg White / Yves Loday	White Formula (GBR)			
Mystere Twister		J. VALER	MYSTERE EUROPE (FRA)			
Windrush Edge						
