= Pete Melvin =

American sailor (born 1962)

Personal information
- Full name: James Henry Melvin
- Nationality: American
- Born: January 11, 1962 (age 64) Jackson, Mississippi, United States

Sport
- Sport: Sailing

Pete Melvin (born January 11, 1962) is an American sailor. He competed in the Tornado event at the 1988 Summer Olympics. Melvin is also a noted yacht designer with his partner Gino Morrelli as Morrelli and Melvin.

== Biography ==
Melvin was born in Jackson, Mississippi in 1962. He spent his early years living in Florida. He gained a degree in aerospace engineering from Boston University after graduating in 1985. For five years, Melvin worked in aircraft design at McDonnell Douglas.

Melvin competed in trials for the 1976 Summer Olympics, 1980 Summer Olympics, and the 1984 Summer Olympics. At the 1988 Summer Olympics in Seoul, Melvin competed in the Tornado event, finishing in 14th place. Between 1997 and 2005, Melvin won three World Championships, and he has also won 25 national titles.

In 1994, along with Gino Morrelli, Melvin designed the Hobie Wave catamaran. In 2010, they were both part of the team that built the USA-17 racing trimaran which went on to win the 2010 America's Cup. Melvin was also involved in writing the AC72 and AC62 rules used in the America's Cup.

Melvin has also competed in races with his son, James.
