= Formula 16 =

5 metre catamaran

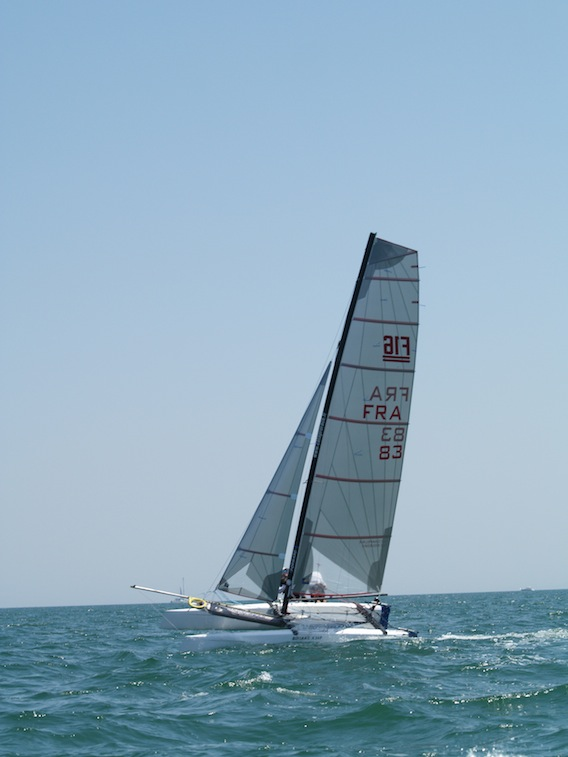
Formula 16 sailed 2-up

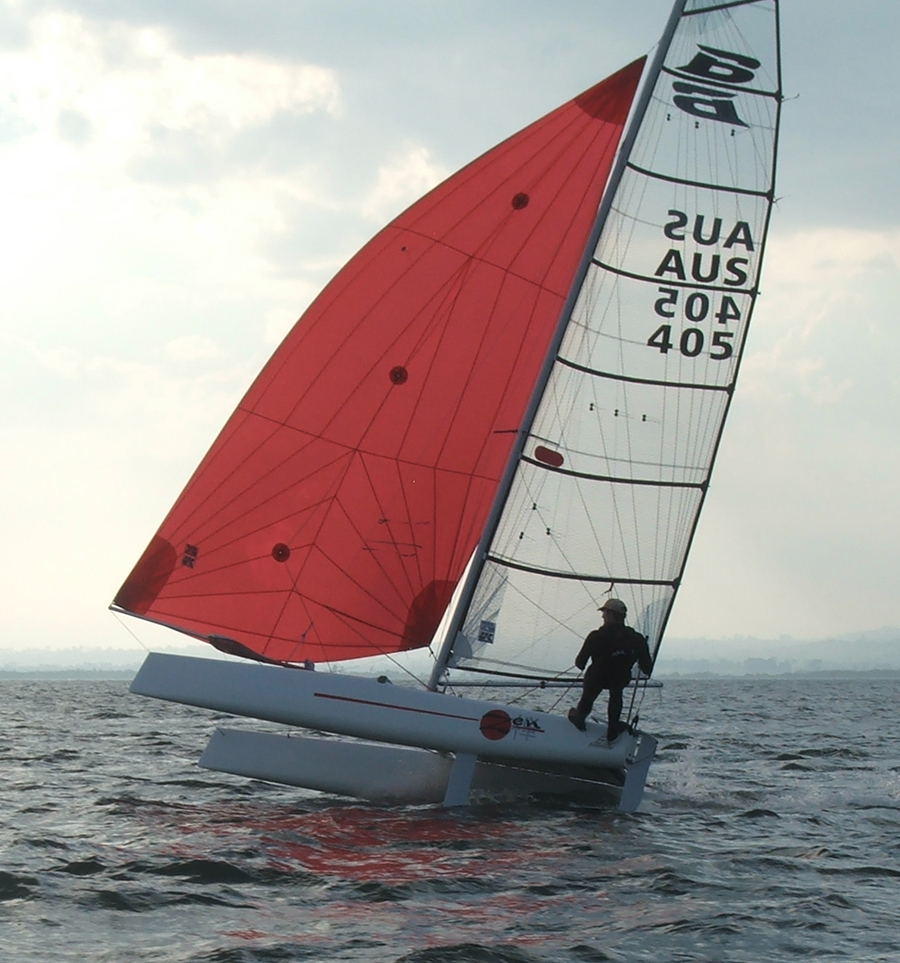
Formula 16 sailed 1-up with spinnaker

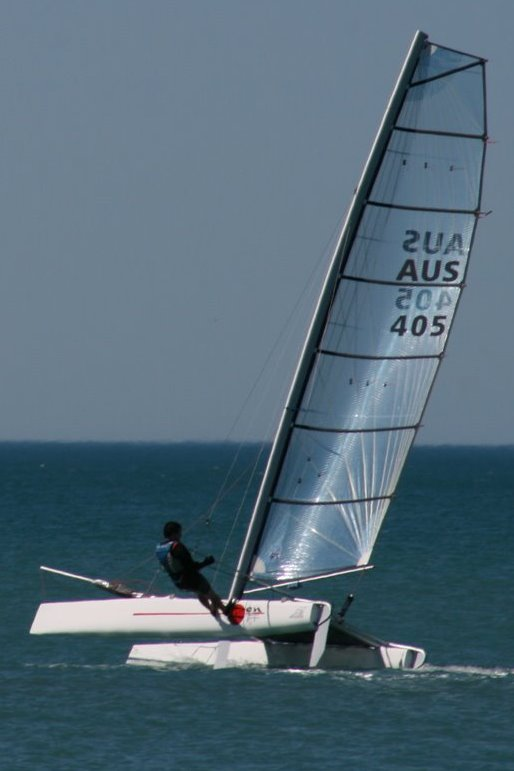
Formula 16 sailed 1-up

The Formula 16 (F16) sport catamaran is an ISAF recognised 5 m long beach catamaran with an asymmetric spinnaker setup.

It is actively sailed in two modes: doublehanded with a jib (2-up), and singlehanded without a jib (1-up).

Its class rules setup is very similar to those of the Formula 18 class of beach catamarans.

In effect any boat that adheres to a certain limited set of general design specifications may participate in all the official class races. The two classes, F18 and F16, govern the racing of their own class compliant boats.

The F16 class was founded in the spring of 2001, after it had become clear by the overwhelming success of the F18 class that formula classes would be the future in sport/beach catamarans and that a more versatile formula class was desired.

In handicap racing, the F16 uses a D-PN of 63.0

== Limits ==
In the beginning, the F18 class rules functioned as a template for the F16 class rules, but not much later the two rule sets started to diverge. The F16 class focused more and more on a truly lightweight design with a reduced rule set. The latter meaning that all rules governing a particular minor detail in the boat design, like the minimum weight of a rudder board, were dropped. The F16 rules control what is known as a 'boxrule'. Eventually, a reduced number of major limits was finalized:

- Maximum overall length is 5 m.
- Maximum overall width 2.5 m.
- Minimum overall weight 104 kg 1-up and 107 kg 2-up.
- Maximum mast height 8.5 m.
- Maximum mainsail area (including mast) 15 m^{2}.
- Maximum jib area 3.7 m^{2}.
- Maximum spinnaker area 17.5 m^{2}.

The other main rules are:

- Mid height width of spinnaker is at minimum 75% of length foot.
- Boat must be rightable by crew either solo or doublehanded without external assistance
- The rig may not be trimmed between start and finish by means other than sheet, downhaul, outhaul, traveller, mast rotation and halyards systems.
- Only "soft" sails are allowed.
- No ballast other than corrector weights up to 7.5 kg are allowed

== Design goals ==
From its inception, the F16 class was engineered towards a dual-role sports catamaran. A careful balancing act between the major components of the F16 boats allows this result.

The result being that the same craft is used for both doublehanded sailing/racing as singlehanded sailing/racing; the craft has a very similar performance in both modes (doublehanded and singlehanded); and the F16 boats share as good as identical performance with their intellectual parent, the Formula 18 class.

Several modifications were made to the early F16 class rules to achieve this result. The founders believed this result to be important to the growth and success of the F16 class. Additionally, both the doublehanded and singlehanded F16s race each other for being first across the line as well. They are simply that close in overall performance around the race course.

The other goal that the F16 class was engineered towards was the ease of handling the boat by any singlehanded or doublehanded crew. By far most sport catamarans are designed for use in only one mode, either as doublehanders or as singlehanders, which makes flexible use of these boats cumbersome and in some cases even risky, as quite a few boats require the combined effort of two crew to right it after a capsize. This design goal forced the F16 setup towards a generally smaller and lighter setup so that an average-sized solo sailor can both handle the boat well while sailing and when taking it out of the water and onto a trailer. By increasing further the lightweight character of the design and incorporating several technological advances, the boat could again be made to perform well when sailed by two average-sized adults. In this respect the F16 class had found its own unique character and has set itself apart from its mentor the F18 class.

== Class development ==
The F16 class has a modest following in the US, Europe, Asia and Australia and class associations have been formed there. The key areas within these regions are Florida/Maryland/California, UK/Netherlands/Belgium/Germany, Singapore/Thailand, New South Wales and Victoria. In 2005 and 2006, the class began to grow in Shanghai (China), Finland, United Arab Emirates, and places in the USA such as Arizona and New Mexico. This is to a large extent due to low-cost home-buildable plans being available next to commercially sold ready-to-sail boats. A good number of these homebuilt wood/epoxy boats race and are very competitive with the glass/vinylester production boats.

The most notable event for F16s in their short history was held in April 2007, where the best 20 teams of the various US sport catamaran classes were invited to compete on Blade F16s at the US Multihull Championship for the Hobie Alter Cup. The Hobie Alter Cup is a long-running invitational championship of catamaran champions, named after Hobie Alter, who popularized beach catamaran sailing in the 1970s. The event was generally a five-day, round-robin on manufacturer-supplied boats to ensure the competition was a test of sailing skill and influenced by differences in boats. John Casey and John Williams won the 2007 event.

In October 2009, the F16s were again used for the Hobie Alter Cup event. This time AHPC provided Viper F16s to the organisation for their use. An unprecedented honor for a class that is still as young as the F16 class. Casey and Williams again won the event.

In November 2010, the Formula 16 Class was granted Recognised Status by the World Sailing the world governing body for the sport. The Formula 16 catamaran had effectively completed its journey from a quirky, enthusiast's catamaran to the mainstream of international sailing.

== Production Designs ==
Design in bold are in production

Name	Years	Designer	Builder	No Built	Notes	Ref.
**Falcon F16**	2010 Onwards	Matt McDonald	Falcon Marine LLC (USA) theboatshop (BEL)			
Viper Mk1	2007 - 2017	Greg Goodall	Goodall Design (AUS)	+300 Built		
**Viper Mk2**	2017 Onwards	Greg Goodall	Goodall Design (AUS)			
**Mattia F500**						
**Nacra F16**	2011 Onwards	Morrelli & Melvin, Peter Vink				
**Bimare X16**						
**Befoil**						
**Cirrus**						

== See also ==
- Formula 16 World Championship
- Viper (catamaran)
- Formula 18
- Formula 18 World Championship
