= Aloha Classic =

The Aloha Classic is touted as "the single most prestigious event in the windsurfing world", held at Ho'okipa Beach Park on the north shore of Maui. The event takes place each year in late October and early November for the best wind and wave conditions and it is common to have 15–20 foot wave faces during the contest. Since 2011 the event has been run by the International Windsurfing Tour (IWT) as the Grand Final of The IWT Wave Tour. The IWT is the Hawaiian based organisation for the wave riders of the Asia Pacific hemisphere. The Aloha Classic has often been the final event of the Professional Windsurfers Association (PWA) crowning the PWA Wave World Champions.

During the 1980s and 1990s The Aloha Classic was a Grand Slam event offering competition in all three of the Professional Boardsailing Association PBA/PWA windsurfing disciplines: wave riding, slalom (windsurf)|slalom and course racing.

Due to the difficulty of raising high levels of prize money through sponsorship, the event could not always offer all disciplines or get the status of an official PWA World Cup. Since 2011, the contest has focused entirely on radical wave riding.

During the 1990s, a second competition was regularly held in Ho'okipa, known as the Maui Invitational. 1994-1995 there was a third competition, known as the Chiemsee World Cup Maui.

With eight victories at these various Hookipa events, Robby Naish is the most successful competitor in the wave contests at Ho'okipa, followed by Jason Polakow (4), Mark Angulo (3) Morgan Noireaux (3). For the women, Angela Cocheran (7) is the best performer in history with seven victories in wave riding, ahead of Iballa Ruano Moreno (4) and Debbie Brown (3). (Status of 2020)

== List of winners ==
Competitions shaded grey were not counted as windsurf world cup.

| Year | Women | Men |
|---|---|---|
| 1984 | (United States) Dana Dawes (overall) (United States) Debbie Brown (Wave) (United States) Dana Dawes (slalom) | (United States) Alex Aguera (overall) (United States) Alex Aguera (Wave) (United States) Alex Aguera (slalom) |
| 1986 | (United States) Kelby Anno (wave) | (United States) Robby Naish (wave) |
| 1987 | (United States) Kelby Anno (wave) (United States) Dana Dawes (slalom) | (United States) Robby Naish (wave) (United States) Alan Cadiz (slalom) |
| 1988 | (United States) Dana Dawes (wave) (Spain) Britt Dunkerbeck (slalom) | (United States) Mark Angulo (wave) (Spain) Bjørn Dunkerbeck (slalom) |
| 1989 | (France) Nathalie Le Lievre (overall) (United States) Angela Cocheran (wave) (Spain) Britt Dunkerbeck (slalom) (France) Nathalie Le Lievre (course race) | (United States) Robby Naish (overall) (United States) Robby Naish (wave) (Spain) Bjørn Dunkerbeck (slalom) (Spain) Bjørn Dunkerbeck (course race) |
| 1990 | (United States) Angela Cocheran (overall) (United States) Angela Cocheran (wave) (Spain) Britt Dunkerbeck (slalom) (New Zealand) Barbara Kendall (course race) | (Spain) Bjørn Dunkerbeck (overall) (United States) Rush Randle (wave) (Sweden) Anders Bringdal (slalom) (Spain) Bjørn Dunkerbeck (course race) |
| 1991 | (Spain) Britt Dunkerbeck (overall) (United States) Angela Cocheran (wave) (Spain) Britt Dunkerbeck (slalom) (Spain) Britt Dunkerbeck (course race) | (Spain) Bjørn Dunkerbeck (overall) (United States) Robby Naish (wave) (Spain) Bjørn Dunkerbeck (slalom) (Spain) Bjørn Dunkerbeck (course race) |
| 1992 | (Spain) Britt Dunkerbeck (slalom) (Spain) Britt Dunkerbeck (course race) wave: no score | (Spain) Bjørn Dunkerbeck (slalom) (Spain) Bjørn Dunkerbeck (course race) wave: no score |
| 1993 | (Germany) Jutta Müller (overall) ? (wave) ? (slalom) ? (course race) | (Spain) Bjørn Dunkerbeck (overall) (Australia) Jason Polakow (wave) (Spain) Bjørn Dunkerbeck (slalom) (Spain) Bjørn Dunkerbeck (course race) |
| 1994 | (France) Nathalie Le Lievre (overall) (New Zealand) Barbara Kendall (wave) (France) Nathalie Le Lievre (slalom) (Italy) Alessandra Sensini (course race) | (Spain) Bjørn Dunkerbeck (overall) (Spain) Bjørn Dunkerbeck (wave) (Spain) Bjørn Dunkerbeck (slalom) (Spain) Bjørn Dunkerbeck (course race) |
| 1998 | (no competition) | (Australia) Jason Polakow (wave) |
| 1999 | (United States) Jennifer Henderson (wave) | (United Kingdom) Nik Baker (wave) |
| 2000 | (United States) Angela Farrell (née Cocheran) (wave) (Netherlands) Lucienne Ernst (Race) | (Argentina) Francisco Goya (wave) (United States) Kevin Pritchard (Race) |
| 2001 | ? | (Dominican Republic) Tony Garcia |
| 2004 | (Japan) Motoko Sato (wave) | wave: no score |
| 2005 | (United States) Jennifer Henderson (wave) | (Spain) Alex Mussolini (wave) |
| 2006 | (Spain) Iballa Ruano Moreno (wave) | (Cape Verde) Josh Angulo (wave) |
| 2011 | (Japan) Junko Nagoshi (wave) | (France) Camille Juban (wave) |
| 2012 | (Japan) Junko Nagoshi (wave) | (United States) Bernd Roediger (wave) |
| 2013 | (no competition) | (United States) Levi Siver (wave) |
| | (Japan) Junko Nagoshi (wave) | (United States) Bernd Roediger (wave) |
| 2014 | (Spain) Iballa Ruano Moreno (wave) | (United States) Morgan Noireaux (wave) |
| | (Japan) Junko Nagoshi (wave) | (Morocco) Boujmaa Guilloul (wave) |
| 2015 | (Spain) Iballa Ruano Moreno (wave) | (United States) Morgan Noireaux (wave) |
| 2016 | (Aruba) Sarah-Quita Offringa (Wave) | (United States) Kevin Pritchard (Wave) |
| 2017 | (France) Sarah Hauser (Wave) | (United States) Morgan Noireaux (Wave) |
| 2018 | (France) Sarah Hauser (Wave) | (France) Camille Juban (Wave) |
| 2019 | (Aruba) Sarah-Quita Offringa (Wave) | (France) Antoine Martin (Wave) |
| 2021 | | (Poland) Adam Warchol (Wave Youth) |
| 2022 | (Australia) Jessica Crisp (Wave) | (Brazil) Marcillio Browne (Wave) |
| 2023 | (Aruba) Sarah-Quita Offringa (Wave) | (France) Antoine Martin (Wave) |
| 2024 | (France) Sarah Hauser (Wave) | (United States) Bernd Roediger (Wave) |
| 2025 | (Aruba) Sarah-Quita Offringa (Wave) | (United States) Morgan Noireaux (Wave) |
| 2026 [34] | Marine Hunter | Marc Paré Rico |

== Maui Invitational ==
In contrast to the Aloha Classic, the Maui Invitational takes part in spring time, when the trade winds are more reliable. This event was most of the time sponsored by the wet suit brand O'Neill. In 2025, the event was revived as Maui Pro-Am sponsored by Maui Fin Company as four star event in the IWT/PWA combined Wave tour.

| Year | Women | Men |
|---|---|---|
| 1984 | Peggy Kind (overall) ? (wave) ? (slalom) | (United States) Robby Naish (overall) (United States) Robby Naish (wave) (United States) Robby Naish (slalom) |
| 1985 | (United States) Debbie Brown (wave) | (United States) Alex Aguera (wave) |
| 1987 | (United States) Debbie Brown (wave) | (United States) Ian Boyd (wave) |
| 1988 | (United States) Lorraine Daly (wave) | (United States) Robby Naish (wave) |
| 1989 | (France) Nathalie Le Lievre (overall) (United States) Angela Cocheran (wave) (France) Nathalie Le Lievre (slalom) (France) Nathalie Le Lievre (course race) | (Spain) Bjørn Dunkerbeck (overall) (United States) Mark Angulo (wave) (Spain) Bjørn Dunkerbeck (slalom) (Australia) Phil McGain (course race) |
| 1990 | (United States) Dana Anderson (wave) | (United States) Dave Kalama (wave) |
| 1991 | (Australia) Jessica Crisp (overall) (United States) Angela Cocheran (wave) (Australia) Jessica Crisp (slalom) (Australia) Jessica Crisp (course race) | (Spain) Bjørn Dunkerbeck (overall) (Australia) Jason Polakow (wave) (Spain) Bjørn Dunkerbeck (slalom) (Spain) Bjørn Dunkerbeck (course race) |
| 1992 | (Spain) Britt Dunkerbeck (course race) wave: no score slalom: no score | (Spain) Bjørn Dunkerbeck (course race) wave: no score slalom: no score |
| 1995 | (France) Caroline Haslin (wave) | (United States) Robby Naish (wave) |
| 2000 | (United States) Angela Farrell (née Cocheran) (wave) | (United States) Kevin Pritchard (wave) |
| 2004 | (Japan) Motoko Sato (wave) | (Australia) Jason Polakow (wave) |
| 2005 | (Spain) Iballa Ruano Moreno (wave) | (Cape Verde) Josh Angulo (wave) |
| 2025 | (France) Marine Hunter (wave) | (Brazil) Marcilio Browne (wave) |
| 2026 | Marine Hunter (wave) | Bernd Roediger (wave) |

== Chiemsee Worldcup Maui ==
At the heights of the windsurfing boom a third Worldcup took place at Ho'okipa, the Chiemsee Worldcup Maui. It took the time slot of the Maui Invitational, which in exchange was moved to early summer.

| Year | Women | Men |
|---|---|---|
| 1994 | (Australia) Jessica Crisp (wave) | (United States) Mark Angulo (wave) |
| 1995 | (Australia) Jessica Crisp (wave) | (United States) Robby Naish (wave) |
