= Allison Shreeve =

Australian windsurfer

Personal information
- Nationality: Australian
- Born: 5 February 1982 (age 44) Port Macquarie, NSW, Australia

Sailing career
- Sport: Sailing
- Classes: Mistral, RS:X, Raceboard, Formula Windsurfing, Funboard, Techno 293

Allison Shreeve (born 5 February 1982) is an Australian athlete who was the PWA World Tour Champion 2004 and won the Formula Windsurfing World Championship in 2005, 2006 and 2007.

== Career ==
=== Speed sailing ===
In November 2005, Shreeve set a new world speed sailing record (A class) at 27.7 Knots (51.3 km/h) at Saintes Maries de la Mer Speed Canal. She topped this with a record of 33.05 (61.2 km/h) knots at Fuerteventura in late July, 2006.

== See also ==
- Robby Naish
- Bjorn Dunkerbeck
