= Formula Windsurfing World Championship =

Windsurfing world championships in formula class

The Formula Windsurfing class is a group of production equipment used for an annual Formula Windsirfung World Championships these were organized by the host club on behalf of the International Formaula Windsurfing Class Association (part of International Windsurfer Association) and recognized by World Sailing, the sports IOC recognized governing body.

== Events ==
Event			Host			Category	Participation					Ref.
Ed.	Dates	Year	Host club	Location	Country	Category	No.			Nat.	Cont	Ref.
1	10-14 July	1999	VVW Nieuwpoort	Nieuwpoort	Belgium	Open						
2		2000		Pattaya	Thailand	Male						
2		2000		Pattaya	Thailand	Female						
3		2001		[[]]	Brazil	Male						
3		2001		[[]]	Brazil	Female						
4		2002		Sylt	Germany	Male						
4		2002		Sylt	Germany	Female						
5		2003		Dranske	Germany	Male						
5		2003		Dranske	Germany	Female						
6		2004		Leba	Poland	Male						
6		2004		Leba	Poland	Female						
7		2005		Melbourne	Australia	Male						
7		2005		Melbourne	Australia	Female						
8	3-10 Sept.	2006		Gangneung City	South Korea	Male						
8	3-10 Sept.	2006		Gangneung City	South Korea	Female						
9		2007		[[]]	Brazil	Male			N/A			
9		2007		[[]]	Brazil	Female		N/A				
10		2008			Portugal	Male			N/A			
10		2008			Portugal	Female		N/A				
11		2009			Spain	Male	54	54	N/A	20	4	
11		2009			Spain	Female	5	N/A	5	5	3	
12		2010		Mendoza	Argentina	Male						
12		2010		Mendoza	Argentina	Female						
13		2011		San Juan	Puerto Rico	Male						
13		2011		San Juan	Puerto Rico	Female						
14		2012		Liepaja	Latvia	Male						
14		2012		Liepaja	Latvia	Female						
15	8-13 Jul	2013	Club Bofor Viganj	Viganj	Croatia	Open	127	121	6	24	3	
16	28Apr -3May	2014		Ocean Park, San Juan	Puerto Rico	Open						
17	7-12 Apr	2015	Clube Naval da Praia da Vitoria	Praia da Vitória, Terceira Island, Azores	Portugal	Open						
18		2016	Clube Naval da Praia da Vitoria	Praia da Vitória, Terceira Island, Azores	Portugal	Open						
19		2017		Sylt	Germany	Open						
20		2018		Portamo	Portugal	Open						
21		2019		Portamo	Portugal	Open						
2019-2025			NOT HELD AS SUPERCEEDED BY THE Formula Foil Windsurfing World Championships									
22		2026			Brazil	Open						

== Medalists Open/Male ==
Year	Gold	Silver	Bronze	1st Female	Ref.
1999	Wojciech Brzozowski (POL)	Manuel Donada (FRA)	Adri Keet (NED)		
2000	Wojciech Brzozowski (POL)	Phil Mcgain (AUS)	Brian Regild (DEN)	N/A	
2001	Kevin Pritchard (USA)	Antoine Albeau (FRA)	Wojciech Brzozowski (POL)	N/A	
2002	Kevin Pritchard (USA)	Antoine Albeau (FRA)	Wojciech Brzozowski (POL)	N/A	
2003	Steve Allen (AUS)	Antoine Albeau (FRA)	Wojciech Brzozowski (POL)	N/A	
2004	Micah Buzianis (USA)	Steve Allen (AUS)	Arnon Dagan (ISR)	N/A	
2005	Antoine Albeau (FRA)	Wojciech Brzozowski (POL)	Gonzalo Costa Hoevel (ARG)	N/A	
2006	Steve Allen (AUS)	Julien Quentel (FRA)	Antoine Albeau (FRA)	N/A	
2007	Robert Aberg (SWE)	Jarek Miarczynski (POL)	Henri Kaar (EST)	N/A	
2008	Xavier Ferlet (GBR)	Jules Denel (FRA)	Ryszard Pikul (POL)	N/A	
2009	Steve Allen (AUS)	Wojciech Brzozowski (POL)	Przemek Miarczynski (POL)	N/A	
2010	Antoine Albeau (FRA)	Paulo Dos Reis (BRA)	Ross Williams (GBR)	N/A	
2011	Antoine Albeau (FRA)	Arnon Dagan (ISR)	Gabriel Browne (BRA)	N/A	
2012	Ross Williams (GBR)	Steve Allen (AUS)	Przemyslaw Miarczynski (POL)	N/A	
2013	Casper Bouman (NED)	Gonzalo Costa Hoevel (ARG)	Stephen Allen (AUS)	62nd / Andrea Ferin (ITA)	
2014	Ross Williams (GBR)	Stephen Allen (AUS)	Gonzalo Costa Hoevel (ARG)		
2015	Gonzalo Costa Hoevel (ARG)	Janis Preiss (LAT)	Sebastian Kornum (DEN)		
2016	Alexandre Cousin (FRA)	Sebastian Koerdel (GER)	Casper Bouman (NED)		
2017	Vincent Langer (GER)	Steve Allen (AUS)	Alexandre Cousin (FRA)		
2018	Gonzalo Costa Hoevel (ARG)	Nicolas Goyard (FRA)	Tristan Algret (FRA)		
2019	Janis Preiss (LAT)	Miguel Martinho (POR)	Martin Ervin (EST)	None took part	

== Medalists Female ==
year	Gold	Silver	Bronze	Ref.
2000	Dorota Staszewska (POL)	Karin Jaggi (SUI)	Lucy Horwood (GBR)	
2001	Dorota Staszewska (POL)	Lucy Horwood (GBR)	Karin Jaggi (SUI)	
2002	Dorota Staszewska (POL)	Lucy Horwood (GBR)	Christine Johnston (GBR)	
2003	Christine Johnston (GBR)	Lucy Horwood (GBR)	Dorota Staszewska (POL)	
2004	Dorota Staszewska (POL)	Allison Shreeve (AUS)	Karin Jaggi (SUI)	
2005	Allison Shreeve (AUS)	Dorota Staszewska (POL)	Lucy Horwood (GBR)	
2006	Allison Shreeve (AUS)	Yshie Ishinoda (JPN)	Sarah Hebert (ARM)	
2007	Allison Shreeve (AUS)	Sarah Hebert (ARM)	Agnieszka Pietrasik (POL)	
2008	Agnieszka Pietrasik (POL)	Morane Demont (FRA)	Carolina Butrich (PER)	
2009	Marta Hlavaty (POL)	Allison Shreeve (AUS)	Morane Demont (FRA)	
2010	Marta Hlavaty (POL)	Morane Demont (FRA)	Farrah Hall (USA)	
2011	Marion Lepert (USA)	Morane Demont (FRA)	Alex Morales (USA)	
2012	Agnieszka Pietrasik (POL)	Maja Dziarnowska (POL)	Agnieszka Bilska (POL)	

== Other Links ==
- Formula Foil Windsurfing World Championships
- iQFoil World Championships
