= Windsurfing =

Water sport

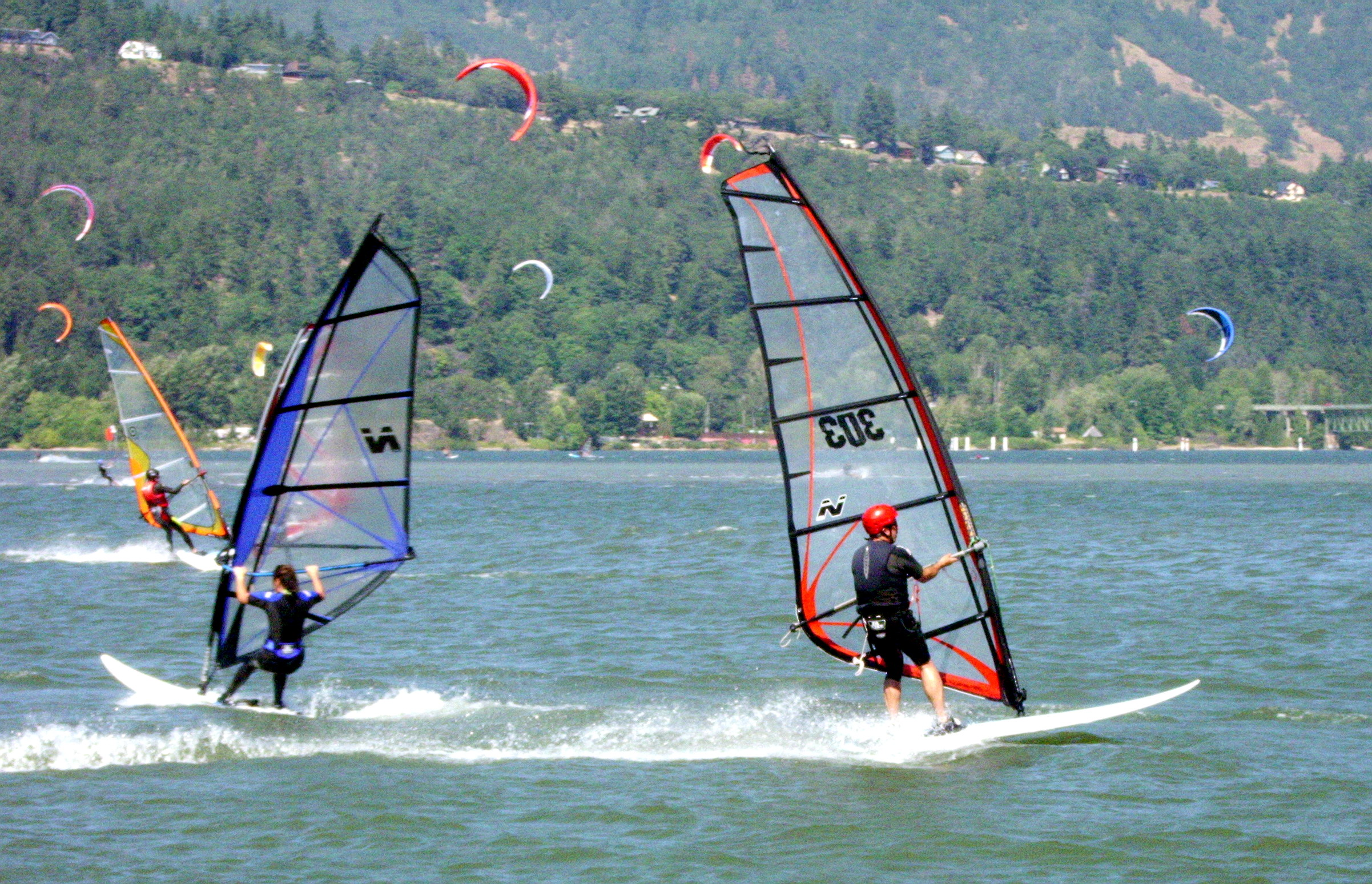
Windsurfing on Columbia River, Oregon

Windsurfing is a wind-propelled water sport that is a combination of sailing and surfing. It is also referred to as "sailboarding" and "boardsailing", and emerged in the late 1960s from the Californian aerospace and surf culture. Windsurfing gained a popular following across Europe and North America by the late 1970s and had achieved significant global popularity by the 1980s. Windsurfing became an Olympic sport in 1984.

== History ==
Darby sailboard, Popular Science, 1965

=== Early sailboard concepts ===
Peter Chilvers is cited as having built a sailboard-type craft in England in 1958.

In 1964, Newman Darby of Pennsylvania developed a rudderless "sailboard" incorporating a pivoting square-rigged or kite-rigged sail. Darby's design allowed the rider to steer a rectangular board by tilting the sail forward and backward. However, the sail was operated in a back-winded configuration, with the sailor positioned on the leeward side of the sail. This arrangement differed significantly from later windsurfing designs and limited both efficiency and performance.

=== The modern windsurfer ===
Between 1967 and 1970, Jim Drake, a California-based aeronautical engineer, invented and co-patented a sail-powered surfboard that introduced the fundamental design principles of modern windsurfing. Drake's design differed substantially from earlier sailboards. It allowed the rider to stand upright on a large surfboard while directly holding on to the windward side of an aerodynamically shaped triangular sail.

Central to Drake's design was the free-sail system, in which the sail rig is connected to the board by a universal joint, and the sailor holds on to the sail directly via a wishbone boom. This configuration allows the sailor's body to function as an integral part of the steering and control system, eliminating the need for a rudder or fixed mast.

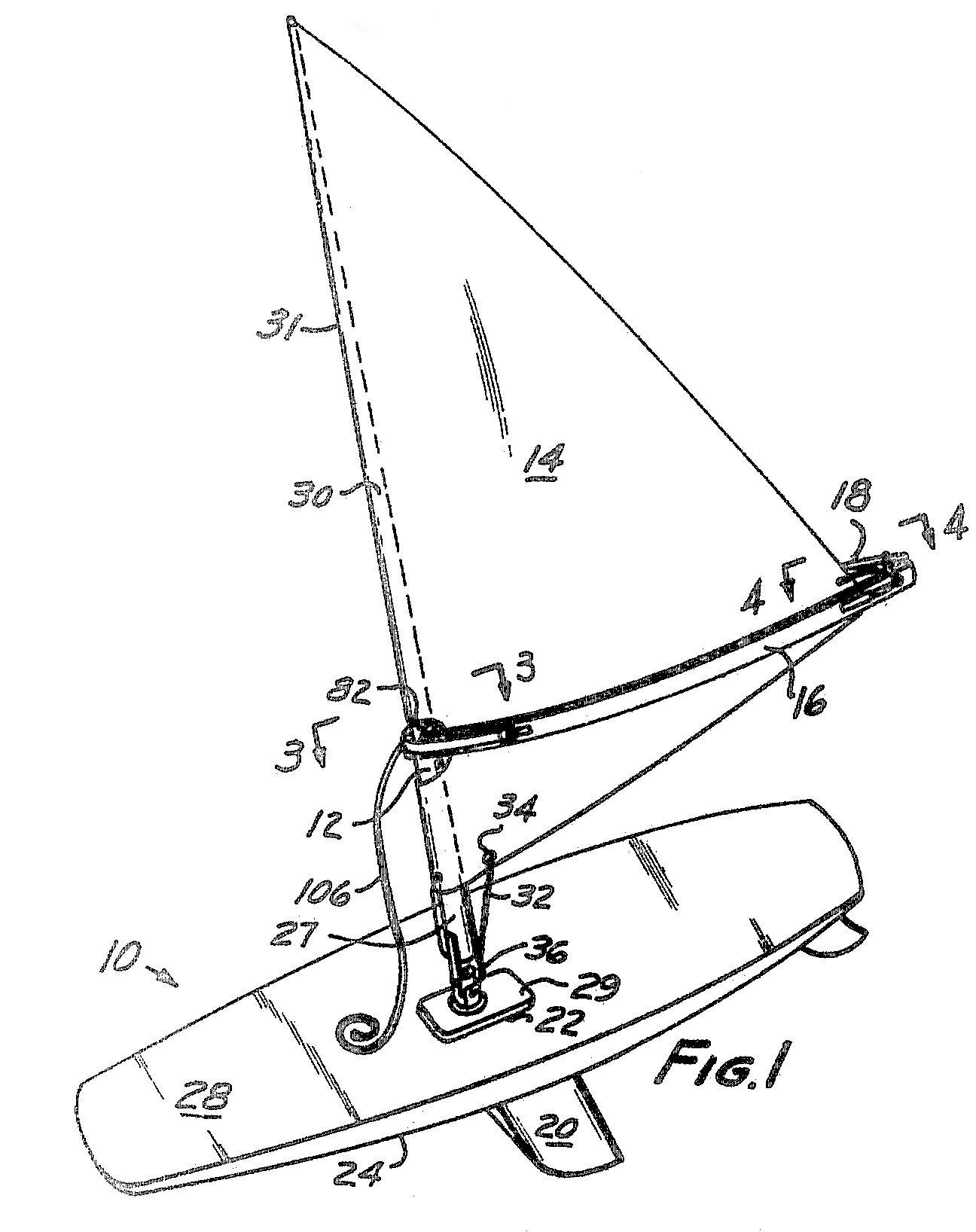
Drake windsurfer, patent drawing, 1967

Drake has stated in various interviews that he recognizes Darby and Chilvers as early sailboard pioneers, and sees himself as the sport's "re-inventor".

=== Commercialization ===
One of Drake's associates, businessman Hoyle Schweitzer, became interested in commercializing the free-sail design developed by Drake. In 1968, Drake and Schweitzer jointly founded the company Windsurfing International, initially operating from Drake's home in Santa Monica, California.

Windsurfing International Inc. produced and sold the original Windsurfer model, which closely followed Drake's design and became the basis for a one-design sailboat racing class. As the sport spread internationally, additional companies entered the market and variations in sailboard design emerged.

=== Patent disputes ===
In 1970, Jim Drake and Hoyle Schweitzer were granted a joint U.S. patent for the windsurfing rig (U.S. Patent 3,487,800). In 1973, Drake sold his share of the patent to Schweitzer.

During the 1970s and early 1980s, windsurfing experienced rapid international growth. As the patent holder, Schweitzer pursued licensing agreements worldwide and required manufacturers to pay royalties to produce sailboards using the patented design. These licensing practices became the subject of controversy within the industry, with critics arguing that high royalty fees constrained competition and innovation. The sport underwent very rapid growth however, particularly in Europe after the sale of a sub-license sold to Ten Cate Sports in the Netherlands. Despite these disputes, the sport continued to expand rapidly, particularly in Europe.

== Equipment ==
Windsurfing equipment has evolved in design over the years and are often classified as either shortboards or longboards. Longboards are usually longer than 3 meters, with a retractable daggerboard, and are optimized for lighter winds or course racing. Shortboards are less than 3 meters long and are designed for planing conditions.

While windsurfing is possible under a wide range of wind conditions, most intermediate and advanced recreational windsurfers prefer to sail in conditions that allow for consistent planing with multi-purpose, not overly specialized, free-ride equipment. Larger (100 to 140 liters) free-ride boards are capable of planing at wind speeds as low as 12 kn (6 m/s) if rigged with an adequate, well-tuned sail in the six to eight square meter range. The pursuit of planing in lower winds has driven the popularity of wider and shorter boards, with which planing is possible in wind as low as 8 kn (4 m/s), if sails in the 10 to 12 square meter range are used.

Modern windsurfing boards can be classified into many categories: The original Windsurfer board had a body made out of polyethylene filled with PVC foam. Later, hollow glass-reinforced epoxy designs were used. Most boards produced today have an expanded polystyrene foam core reinforced with a composite sandwich shell, that can include carbon fiber, kevlar, or fiberglass in a matrix of epoxy and sometimes plywood and thermoplastics. Racing and wave boards are usually very light (5 to 7 kg), and are made out of carbon sandwich. Such boards are very stiff, and veneer is sometimes used to make them more shock-resistant. Boards aimed at the beginners are heavier (8 to 15 kg) and more robust, containing more fiberglass.

- Beginner boards: (Sometimes called funboards) these often have a daggerboard, are almost as wide as Formula boards, and have plenty of volume, hence stability.
- Freeride: Boards meant for comfortable recreational cruising (mostly straight-line sailing and occasional turning) at planing speed (aka blasting), mainly in flat waters or in light to moderate swell. They typically fall into the volume range of 90 to 170 liters. The so-called freeride sailing movement diverged from course racing as more recreational sailors chose to sail freely without being constrained to sailing on courses around buoys.
- Racing longboards: Internationally recognised One Design Classes such as the WINDSURFER Class, Mistral One Design, or the old Olympic RS:X class race boards, and the new 2024 Olympic Class iQFoil.
- Formula Windsurfing Class: Shorter boards up to one meter in width, for use in Formula Windsurfing races. See below for a more detailed description.
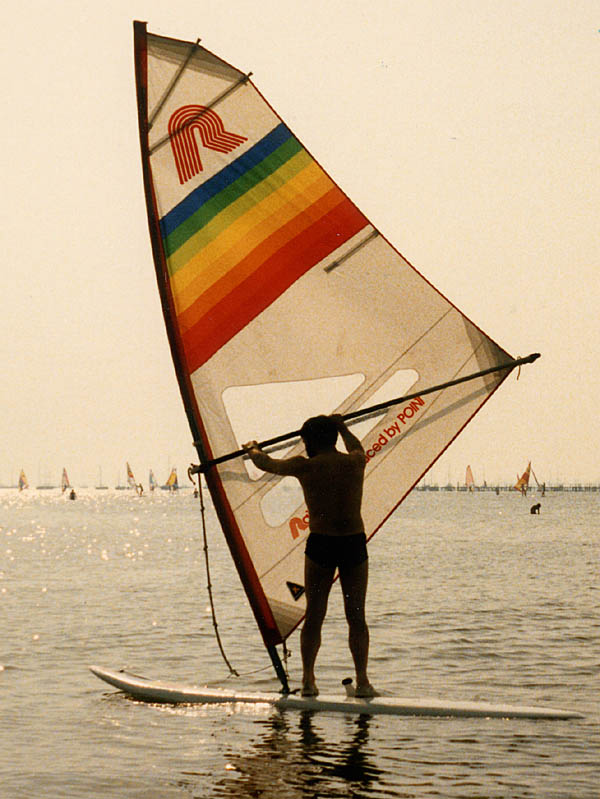
  Windsurfing in the late evening on a longboard at Sandbanks in the 1980s (Poole Harbour, England)
- Slalom boards: In the past, the key feature of slalom boards was merely speed, but it has been proven that maneuverability and ease of use are as important as speed in order to get you around the slalom course faster, and therefore modern slalom boards are shortboards aimed at top speed, maneuverability and ease of use.
- Speed boards: In essence an extremely narrow and sleek slalom board, built for top speed only.
- Freestyle boards: Related to wave boards in terms of maneuverability, these are wider, higher volume boards geared specifically at performing acrobatic tricks (jumps, rotations, slides, flips and loops) on flat water. Usually 80 to 110 liters in volume, and about 203 to 230 centimeters in length, with widths frequently in excess of 60 centimeters. Freestyle boards began to diverge more noticeably in design from wave boards in the early part of the 2000 decade, as aerial tricks (the Vulcan, Spock, Grubby, Flaka, and related New School maneuvers, almost all involving a jump-and-spin component) became the predominant part of the freestyle repertoire, superseding Old School moves, in which the board did not leave contact with the water.
- Wave boards: Smaller, lighter, more maneuverable boards for use in breaking waves. Characteristically, sailors on wave boards perform high jumps while sailing against waves, and they ride the face of a wave performing narrow linked turns (bottom turns, cutbacks, and top-turns) in a similar way to surfing. Wave boards usually have a volume between 65 and 105 liters, with a length between 215 and 235 centimeters, and 50 to 60 centimeters in width. A general rule is for a sailor to use a wave board whose volume in liters is about the same as the sailor's weight in kilograms – more volume providing additional flotation for sailing in light winds, and less for high winds, where less volume is needed to achieve planing. In recent years, the average width of wave boards has increased slightly, as the length has shrunk, while the range of volume has been maintained the same more or less—according to board designers this makes wave boards easier to use under a wider range of conditions by sailors of differing abilities. The most common sizes of sails used with wave boards are in the range of 3.4 to 6.0 square meters, depending on the wind speed and the weight of the sailor.

Sails

Modern windsurfing sails are often made of monofilm (clear polyester film), dacron (woven polyester) and mylar. Areas under high load may be reinforced with kevlar.

Two designs of a sail are predominant: camber induced and rotational. Cambered sails have 1–5 camber inducers – plastic devices at the ends of battens which cup against the mast. They help create a rigid aerofoil shape for faster speed and stability, but at the cost of maneuverability and how light the sail feels. The trend is that racier sails have camber inducers while wave sails and most recreational sails do not. The rigidity of the sail is also determined by a number of battens.

Beginners' sails often do not have battens, so they are lighter and easier to use in light winds. However, as the sailor improves, a battened sail will provide greater stability in stronger winds.

Rotational sails have battens which protrude beyond the back aspect of the mast. They flip or "rotate" to the other side of the mast when tacking or jibing, hence the rotation in the name. Rotational sails have an aerofoil shape on the leeward side when powered, but are nearly flat when sheeted out (unpowered). In comparison with cambered sails, rotational designs offer less power and stability when sailing straight, but are easier to handle when maneuvering. Rotational sails are usually lighter and easier to rig.

A windsurfing sail is tensioned at two points: at the tack (by downhaul), and at the clew (by outhaul). There is a set of pulleys for downhauling at the tack, and a grommet at the clew. Most shape is given to the sail by applying a very strong downhaul, which by design bends the mast. The outhaul tension is relatively weak, mostly providing leverage for controlling the sail's angle of attack.

The sail is tuned by adjusting the downhaul and the outhaul tension. Generally, a sail is trimmed more (flatter shape) for stronger winds. More downhaul tension loosens the upper part of the leech, allowing the top of the sail to twist and "spill" wind during gusts, shifting the center of effort (strictly, the center of pressure) down. Releasing downhaul tension shifts the center of effort up. More outhaul lowers the camber/draft, making the sail flatter and easier to control, but less powerful; less outhaul results in more draft, providing more low-end power, but usually limiting speed by increasing aerodynamic resistance.

The disciplines of windsurfing (wave, freestyle, freeride) require different sails. Wave sails are reinforced to survive the surf, and are nearly flat when depowered to allow riding waves. Freestyle sails are also flat when depowered, and have high low-end power to allow quick acceleration. Freeride sails are all-rounders that are comfortable to use and are meant for recreational windsurfing. Race sails provide speed at the expense of qualities like comfort or maneuverability.

The size of the sail is measured in square meters and can be from 3 m^{2} to 5.5 m^{2} for wave sails and 6 m^{2} to 15 m^{2} for race sails, with ranges for freestyle and freeride sails spanning somewhere between these extremes. Learning sails for children can be as small as 0.7 m^{2} and race sails up to 15 m^{2}.

Associated Equipment

- Mast
- Boom
- Fin (similar shape to a surfboard fin but is usually stronger for windsurfing)
- Universal joint (elastic joints are more common, but some are mechanical)
- Harness and Harness lines
- Wet suit/dry suit
- Footwear
- Helmet
- Personal flotation device
- Travel gear – sail bags, board bags, car racks
- Safety gear: line, distress strobe light, whistle, marine VHF radio

People windsurfing in Kanagawa, Japan

== Technique ==
A sailboard is powered and controlled by the coordinated movements of the sail about its uni-joint and of the sailor around the board. This is achieved by balancing the weight of the sailor against the wind pressure in the sail, while adjusting both factors relative to the board. Learning this involves the development of reflexes and "muscle memory" similar to the process of learning to ride a bicycle. These skills are typically and optimally done on large, buoyant boards in light winds on flat water. Depending on wind conditions and the skill or intentions of the rider, at some point the sailboard will begin planing, resulting in a rapid increase in speed. This higher speed requires the learning of new skills as the apparent wind changes and the board becomes steerable like a surfboard.

=== Learning and skill progression ===
Learning is a strenuous activity with many falls into the water, climbs back onto the board and repeating. The time taken to reach the point of significant enjoyment varies greatly.

=== Youth ===
Windsurfing is suitable for children as young as 5, with several board and sail brands producing "Kids Rigs" to accommodate these short and light weight windsurfers. In some countries, organisations exist to provide entry into the sport in a semi-formal or club-style environment (i.e. The RYA's Team 15 scheme). Robert (Robby) Naish took up the fledgling sport of windsurfing at the age of 11, and in 1976 won his first overall World Championship title at the age of 13.

=== Light winds ===
The board moves through the water – much like a sailing boat does – using an extendable centreboard (if available) and fin or skeg for stability and lateral resistance. The centreboard is retracted at broad points of sail, again similarly to a sailing boat, to allow for jibing control. In these conditions windsurf boards also tack and jibe like a sailing boat.

Directional control is achieved by moving the rig either forward (turning away from the wind) or aft (turning towards the wind). When jibing, the clew of the sail is let around and allowed to rotate out and around the mast.

Fall recovery: The rider climbs onto the board, grabs the pulling rope (uphaul), makes sure the mast foot is placed between his/her two feet, pulls the sail about one third out of the water, lets the wind turn the sail-board combination until he/she has the wind right in the back, pulls the sail all the way out, places the "mast hand" (hand closest to the mast) on the boom, pulls the mast over the center line of the board, places the "sail hand" (hand furthest from the mast) on the boom, then pulling on it to close the sail and power it.

=== Strong winds ===
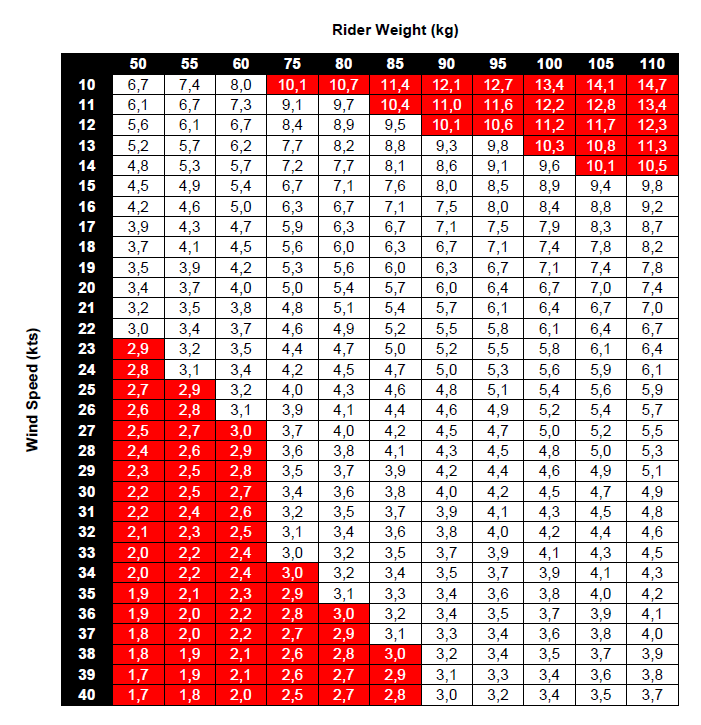
Ideal sail size (m^{2}) for different wind speeds and rider weights (recreational level). The red values indicate sail sizes that are unpractical or not available.

In planing conditions a harness is typically worn to more efficiently use the rider's weight to counter the force in the sail. As the wind increases, the rider continues to sheet the sail, the fin generates more lift, and the board gains speed, transitioning onto a plane. The volume of board in the water (displacement) decreases, and the rider moves rearward, stepping into the footstraps for improved control. When planing, the board skims on the surface rather than displacing water as it moves. Planing can be achieved at different wind speeds depending on the rider's weight, sail and fin size, wave conditions, and rider ability. With modern equipment planing can normally be achieved at a wind speed of around 12 kn (6 m/s). The transition from displacement motion to planing requires a jump in energy, but once planing, water resistance decreases dramatically. This means that it is possible to continue to plane, although the wind has dropped below a level that would be required to transition to plane. A board in plane can be much smaller than a board moving by displacement (thereby gaining an advantage in gear weight and board control). Lateral resistance to the wind is provided by the fin alone (generating more lift at higher speeds) and a centreboard is no longer used (smaller boards do not have one). A fin generates lift, transferring a strong load to the board, and so is usually constructed of carbon fiber for accurate shape and strength. A low-pressure area develops on the windward side of the fin, which can lead to cavitation, leading to a sudden loss of lift, called "spin-out" (equivalent to "stalling" in flight terminology). Ideal planing conditions for most recreational riders is 15–25 kn (7.7–13 m/s) of wind, but experts can windsurf in much windier conditions. Planing is considered one of the most exhilarating aspects of the sport.

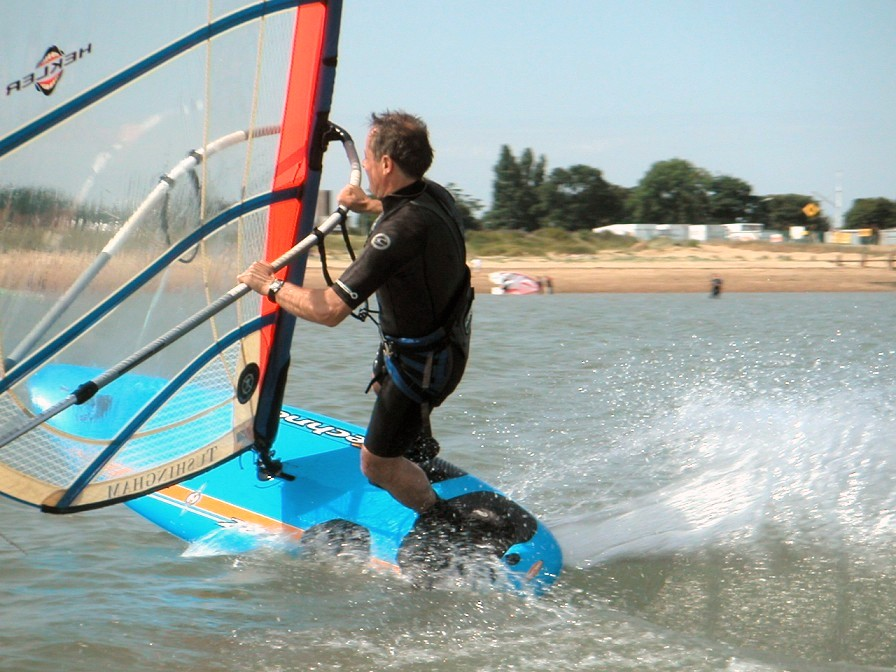
Carving a jibe: the sailor is turning to the left, just past dead downwind. To finish the turn, he will jibe the sail by releasing with his left hand so that the sail flips around.

Steering: Windsurfers have no rudder. To steer, the sailor may lean the mast forward or aft to move the center of effort, or may tilt the board by putting pressure on the rail in order to carve a turn through the water (this works by shifting the center of lateral resistance). When sailing in displacement mode, moving the sail is most effective, but once the board is on a plane, it is more easily steered by carving. In practice, most turns involve some combination of sail and board movement. For example, when a jibe (a turn in which the sail switches sides while heading downwind) is executed at full speed (a so-called "carve jibe", "power jibe" or "planing jibe"), the rider turns downwind by leaning the sail forward, sheeting and applying pressure to the inside rail, leaning into the turn much like a snowboarder making a toe-side turn. The windward boom is released after the board turns downwind, allowing the sail to switch sides. Tacking is turning around going upwind, and at higher speed has become an advanced maneuver, requiring quick movements and good balance. A heel-side turn while planing (called a "cut-back") is usually only executed in wave riding.

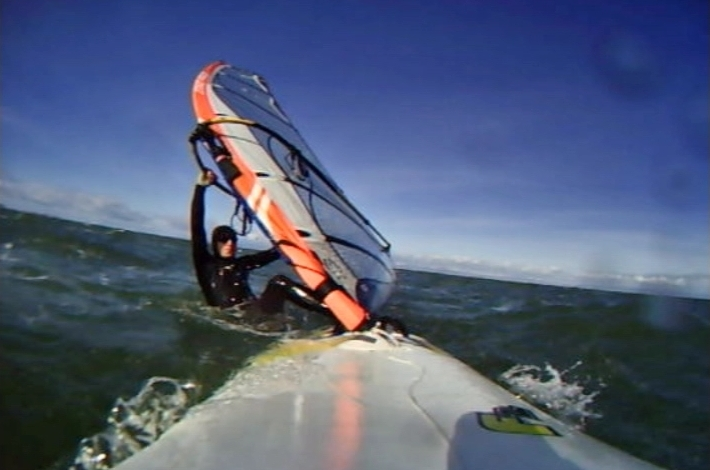
Windsurfer being pulled up onto the board during a water-start

Waterstart: In strong winds it is difficult to uphaul the sail (pulling it out of the water while standing on the board) so waterstarting is necessary. This is done (while water treading) by positioning the mast perpendicular to the wind, lifting the luff out of the water to allow the wind to catch the sail, and then having the sail pull the sailor onto the board. As the sail becomes powered, it is then trimmed to bring the rider, board, and sail back onto a plane. Occasionally a rider may be unable to waterstart if the wind has dropped. If this happens the rider can wait for a gust and "pump" the sail to get back on the board. If this becomes hopeless uphauling the sail will be necessary.

== Racers ==
=== Olympic class ===
Olympic Sailing included Olympic Boardsailing as a demonstration Sport, tested on the Windglider fun board at the Olympic Games of 1984. Olympic Boardsailing was given full Sport status with the Lechner at the 1988 Olympic Games. A Women's Olympic Lechner 390 Boardsailing Class of Sailing was added the Summer of 1992.

The Olympic Games from 1896 did not include any women specific class of sailing until 1988. The Boardsailing Class officially began the year of 1988 with only a Men's Olympic Lechner Boardsailing Class. The Barcelona Games of 1992 was significant to the history of Women in Sport, when the Olympic Women's Boardsailing Class began in Spain on the Mediterranean Sea.

The first three classes were: Windglider (demo), Division II (men only), Lechner A-390 (Women Class & Men's Class) and the Mistral One Design Class. The Mistral had a worldwide organization with Mistral Schools to learn windsurfing. This manufacturer had a range of boards from short boards, wave boards, slalom boards, fun boards and race boards.

The Summer of 1992 the Olympic Mistral One Design was selected as versatile for youth, women and men. This gear was particularly ideal for a broad wind range from five knots to thirty-five knots of wind.

Olympic Windsurfing involves 'One Design' boards, each sailor windsurfing with the identical board design, daggerboards, fins and sails. The equipment is specifically selected to allow racing in a wide range of sailing conditions. The former Mistral Olympic class was better for youth, women and light weight men. Many women changed classes of Olympic Sailing when the gear was changed from Mistral to RSX. The next class was favoured by middle weight and heavy weight men with the shift to a significantly larger sail size. The Neil Pryde RS:X was used for the first time in the 2008 Summer Olympics. In 2024 the new Olympic Class windsurfer used advanced foil technology with the iQFoil one design class.

=== One Design Racing classes ===
These one-design classes are utilized for racing due to relatively low costs; the gear design can remain competitive for several years without class changes. In contrast, professional gear often undergoes design changes as frequently as every six months, making regular upgrades more practical with sponsorship. The stability of the one-design format allows intermediate windsurfers to use the same gear as Olympic Class athletes. These classes include: the original Windsurfer class (including the Windsurfer LT), the Mistral One Design, the Youth development class Bic-Techno, and the iQFoil.

=== Formula class ===
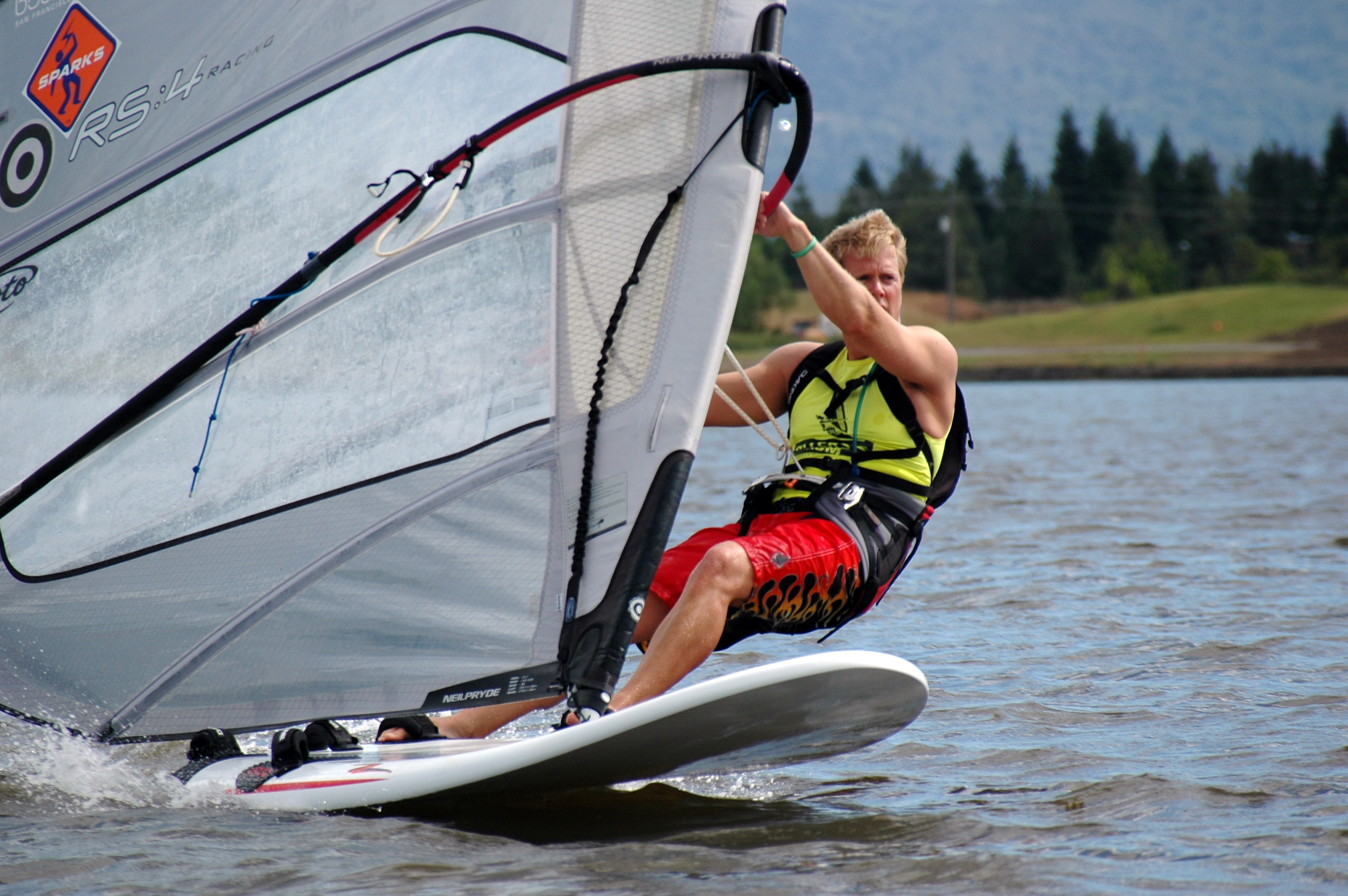
Formula racer in San Francisco Bay

Formula windsurfing has developed over the last 15 years in order to facilitate high-performance competition in light and moderate winds. Formula is now a class of windsurfing boards controlled by World Sailing that has the principal characteristic of a maximum 1m width. They have a single fin of maximum length 70 cm and carry sails up to 12.5 m^{2}. Class rules allow sailors to choose boards produced by multiple manufacturers, as long as they are certified as Formula boards and registered with ISAF, and use fins and sails of different sizes. With the sail, fin and board choices, the equipment is able to be tailored to suit sailors of all body shapes and formula windsurfing presents one of the fastest course-racing sailing craft on the water. Formula Windsurfing is popular in many locations around the globe with predominantly light winds and flat water.

Large sails in combination with the 'wide-style' design allow planing in very low wind conditions as well as control and usability in high winds and bigger sea conditions. Non-planing sailing is very difficult with this design and racing is only conducted with a strict 7 kn (4 m/s) wind minimum in place. Formula boards are used on "flat water" as opposed to coastal surf, but racing is still held in windy conditions involving swell and chop. In 2008, a Formula Windsurfing Grand-Prix World Tour began, with events in Europe and South America complementing the single-event World Championships as a professional tour for the Formula class.

Formula boards have excellent upwind and downwind ability, but are not as comfortable on a beam reach unless fin sizes are reduced. This explains why the course is usually a box with longer upwind and downwind legs, or just a simple upwind-downwind return course.

=== Raceboard class ===
Raceboards are longer windsurf boards with a daggerboard and movable mast rail allowing the sailor to be efficient on all points of sail. Excellent upwind ability is combined with good reaching and even downwind ability typically sailed in an Olympic triangle course. Whilst in decline in manufacture since the advent of shortboard course racing (which evolved into Formula) there remains some models in production and most notably the IMCO One Design remains popular amongst amateur racing clubs.

=== Slalom ===
Slalom is a high-speed race. Typically there are two sorts of slalom courses.

- Figure of eight: All of the course should on a beam reach with two floating marks that have to be jibed around.
- Downwind: More than two marks are laid and sailors sail a downwind course – jibing around each mark only once.

Slalom boards are small and narrow, and require high winds. Funboard class racing rules require winds of 9–35 kn (4.6–18 m/s) for the slalom event to take place.

=== Ocean Slalom Marathon ===
There are 3 major Ocean Slalom Marathons in the world: The Defi-Wind in France, The Lancelin Ocean Classic in Western Australia, and the Hatteras Marathon in the USA.

=== Super X ===
This discipline is a cross between freestyle and slalom. Competitors race on a short downwind slalom course, must duck jibe on all turns, and are required to perform several tricks along the way. Competitors are required to wear protective equipment. The Super X discipline was short lived and is now largely unpracticed; it reached its peak in the early 2000s,

=== Speedsailing ===
Speedsailing takes place in several forms. The International Speed Windsurfing Class (ISWC) organizes (under the umbrella of World Sailing) competitions in various locations around the world known for conditions suitable for good speeds. The events are made up of heats sailed on a 500m course. The average of each sailor's best 2 speeds on the 500m course, which is typically open for 2 hours per heat, is their speed for that heat. As such it is possible for the sailor with the outright fastest time not to win the heat if his second best time pulls his average down. Points are given for the placings in the heats and the overall event winner is the sailor with the best point score (again not necessarily the fastest sailor). Likewise points are given for places in the events and at the last event a World Speedsurfing Champion is crowned.

On record attempts controlled by the World Sailing Speed Record Council (WSSRC) competitors complete timed runs on a 500m or 1 nautical mile (1,852m) course. The current 500m record (for Windsurfers) is held by French windsurfer Antoine Albeau. The women's 500m Record is 48.03 knots held by Jenna Gibson, from England, also in Luderitz. The Men's nautical mile record is held by Bjorn Dunkerbeck and the women's mile record is held by Zara Davis both set in Walvis Bay, Namibia

With the availability of compact GPS units and the website gps-speedsurfing.com, speedsurfers have organized informal and formal competitions, including the European Speed Meetings and Speedweeks in Australia. More than 5,000 sailors are registered on the site, allowing windsurfers worldwide to compare speeds.

Men's Speed Sailing Records	Date	Sailor	Location
53.49 kn (27.5 m/s)	1 December 2024	Antoine Albeau	Luderitz, Namibia
53.27 kn (27.4 m/s)	5 November 2015	Antoine Albeau	Luderitz, Namibia
52.05 kn (26.8 m/s)	November 2012	Antoine Albeau	Luderitz, Namibia

Women's Speed Sailing Records	Date	Sailor	Location
48.03 kn (24.7 m/s)	25 November 2024	Jenna Gibson	Luderitz, Namibia
47.06 kn (24.2 m/s)	25 November 2022	Heidi Ulrich	Luderitz, Namibia
46.49 kn (23.9 m/s)	November 2017	Zara Davis	Luderitz, Namibia

=== Indoor ===
"In 1990 indoor windsurfing was born with the Palais Omnisports de Paris – Bercy making its spectacular debut. It was during this first indoor event that Britain's Nik Baker, from the south coast, flourished and went on to add a whopping x6 Indoor World Championships to his name".

Indoor windsurfing competitions are held, especially in Europe, during winter. Powerful fans lined up along the side of a large pool, propel the windsurfers. Indoor competition disciplines include slalom style races and ramp jumping competitions. It is extremely dangerous because the pool is barely one meter deep and is surrounded by concrete.

In March 1995, World Champion Jessica Crisp sustained a severe, career-threatening leg injury during a ramp-jumping warm-up session at an indoor windsurfing event in Paris. While executing an aerial maneuver, Crisp collided with a damaged metal ramp, sustaining a compound fracture that required emergency surgery at a local French hospital. This incident occurred during a period of significant professional success and prominence for Crisp across Europe.

The most famous indoor champions include Robert Teriitehau, Jessica Crisp, Robby Naish, Nick Baker, Eric Thieme, and Nathalie LeLievre.

== Riders ==
=== Wavesailing ===
Wave sailing took off during the rapid development of windsurfing on the Hawaiian islands of Oahu and Maui. It can be seen as comprising two distinct (but related) parts, wave riding and wave jumping.

A typical wave contest will score two jumps going out and two wave rides coming in. A high scoring heat would consist of a double clean forward rotating jump, a high one foot backward rotating jump, a long wave ride with flowing bottom turns, radical top turns, a series of aerials and a 360 aerial manoeuvre on the face of the waves such as a 'goiter', 'taka', wave 360, planing forward or clean flowing back-loop. Depending on the conditions at the location, some competitions will focus more on jumping while others focus more on the wave-riding aspects.

The best wave riding locations on earth include: Ho'okipa on the north shore of Maui, Ponta Preta and Alibaba in Cabo Verde off the west coast of Africa, One Eye in Mauritius island off the east cost of Madagascar, Margaret River in Western Australia, Cloudbreak in Fiji islands, Pacasmayo and Chicama in Peru, Topocalma in Chile.

The PWA World Cup Wavesailing competitions crown the professional world champions each year. One of the most prestigious events in the windsurfing world is called The Aloha Classic at Ho'okipa Beach on the north shore of Maui, Hawaii.

The Aloha Classic held at Ho'okipa Beach Park on the north shore of Maui, takes place each year in late October and early November for the best wind and wave conditions and it is common to have 15–20 foot wave faces during the contest. Since 2011 the event has been run by the International Windsurfing Tour (IWT)[3] as the Grand Final of the IWT Wave Tour. The IWT is the Hawaiian-based organisation for the wave riders of the Asia Pacific hemisphere. The Aloha Classic has often been the final event of the Professional Windsurfers Association (PWA)[4] crowning the PWA Wave World Champions.

=== Wave riding ===
Wave riding is a form of surfing with the extra speed and power afforded by the sail. It is strongly connected to its roots in surfing in style and culture. It involves the rider performing a series of bottom turns, top turns, and cutbacks whilst riding an unbroken wave back to the shore. Top wave sailors are able to incorporate aerial moves into their wave riding and will use overhanging wave lips to launch themselves out in front of the wave in spectacular giant aerials.

=== Wave jumping ===
Wave jumping involves stunts of varying levels of difficulty which are performed after the rider has jumped from the peak of an unbroken wave. These are commonly referred to as aerial moves and include both forward rotation and backward rotations. The rider and his equipment rotate, doing single and double rotations and jumps where the sailor contorts his or her body and equipment. Recent innovations have included combining moves whilst airborne and, for the first time in 2008, one professional sailor, Ricardo Campello, has made attempts at a triple forward loop during a 2008 PWA competition.

=== Big wave riding ===
At the most extreme end of the sport is big wave riding which means riders on waves faces over 30 feet high. The most popular place for this is on the north shore of Maui at place called Pe'ahi to the local Hawaiians, and known as JAWS to the rest of the world. The biggest waves here can be up to 60 foot faces. It breaks only in the winter months from late October to March. Other famous big wave locations include Nazaré in Portugal. Famous contemporary big wave riders include Kai Lenny, Marcilio Browne, Robby Swift, Sarah Hauser, Jason Polakow, and Robby Naish. The inaugural Big Wave Challenge announced the first ever winners in this category on April 10, 2020.

=== Storm riding ===
The most famous storm riding event is known as The Red Bull Storm Chase. It occurs only when there is a massive storm forecast with winds over 60 knots and giant waves over 20 feet. It is an invitational event and is extremely dangerous. The most recent winner was West Australian Jaeger Stone.

=== Freestyle ===
Freestyle is a timed event which is judged. The competitor who has the greatest repertoire, or manages to complete most stunts, wins. Freestyle is about show and competitors are judged on their creativity. Both the difficulty and the number of tricks make up the final score. Sailors who perform tricks on both tacks (port and starboard), and perform the tricks fully planing score higher marks. High scoring moves include Shifty (Shaka Pushloop), Double Air-Culo, Air-Kabikuchi, Air-Skopu and double Power-Moves, for example Air-Funnel Burner and Double Culo. The latest freestyle windsurfing is well documented and gets constantly updated on Continentseven. For novice windsurfers, low-wind freestyle tricks are an appropriate start, such as sailing backwards with the fin out of the water, or transitioning from a sailing stance to sitting on the board while continuing to sail.

=== Big air ===
Competitors compete to see who can record the highest jump or maneuver. A 3D accelerometer is worn to measure and record heights of the jumps. Xensr is a manufacturer of 3D accelerometers and promoter of the Big Air competition. It is a popular discipline on the Columbia River near the town of Hood River, Oregon, USA.

== International stars ==
=== Top men ===
- Robby Naish (USA): one of the first windsurfing champions to gain international fame, he dominated the early years of competition in the 1970s and 1980s. World Champion from 1976 to 1979, Overall World Champion from 1983 to 1987, and Wave World Champion in 1988, 1989, and 1991. IWT BIG WAVE All-Time BIGGEST WAVE RIDER Champion 2020 (photo)
- Björn Dunkerbeck (ESP): the successor to Naish, he dominated international professional competition from the late 1980s and throughout the 1990s. Twelve-time PWA Overall World Champion in a row. He won the Professional Windsurfers Association (PWA) World Championships for Slalom, Wave, Course Racing and Overall, a record forty one times in total. He is credited in the Guinness Book of World Records as the most successful athlete of all time with 42 World Titles.
- Antoine Albeau (FRA): 22 times World Champion in various disciplines: Formula windsurfing, Super X, Freestyle, Slalom, Race, Speed, Overall. Holder of the windsurf speed record 53.27 knots, on the 5th of November 2015.
- Stephan van den Berg (NED), World Champion 1979–1983, gold medal winner first Olympic windsurfing contest in Los Angeles, California in 1984.
- Anders Bringdal (SWE). Division 2 Heavyweight Champion 1984, Funboard World Champion 1985, Professional windsurfer PBA/PWA 1985 at Sylt. PBA Slalom Champion 1987, PBA Courseracing Champion 1988, Speed World Cup Champion 2009. First man over 50 knots in official timing over 500 metres in Lüderitz 2012.
- Arnaud de Rosnay (FRA): Photographer, and windsurfing adventurer. Best known for his open-ocean windsurfing exploits, and numerous long distance crossings in conflict areas. Lost at sea in November 1984 in the Taiwan Strait. He created the first speedsailing event in 1981, a 40 km race in Maui. 80 competitors participated in the first event, Arnaud de Rosnay finishing second behind Robby Naish. He is also credited with the invention of Kite surfing (1980) and land sailing (Speedsail 1977), even crossing a distance of 1380 km in the Sahara in 1979.
- Christian Marty (FRA): Airline pilot for Air France. He was the first person to windsurf across the Atlantic Ocean in 1981, from Dakar, Senegal to Kourou, French Guiana. He was later captain of Air France Flight 4590 which crashed after takeoff killing everyone on board and several more people on the ground.
- Peter Boyd (USA): Moved to Maui in 1980, and pioneered several windsurfing maneuvers. He was the first to perform an aerial loop, which was considered impossible by many. The maneuver opened the door to a variety of aerial loop variations, including the push loop and double rotations. While innovation was his main focus, Boyd did defeat World champion, Ken Winner several times at International competitions.
- Guy Cribb (GBR): four times world championships runner-up in the 1990s. 13 UK champion titles.
- Mark Angulo (USA): Early pioneer of many wave sailing moves, including the wave-face 360.
- Jason Polakow (AUS): PWA Wave World Champion, 1997, 1998. First windsurfer to ride big wave of Nazare, in Portugal.
- Kevin Pritchard (USA): PWA Overall World Champion, 2000. PWA Wave World Champion, 2006. Aloha Classic Wave Champion 2016.
- Nik Baker (GBR): Three-time PWA Wave World 2nd place, six-time Indoor World Champion.
- Josh Angulo (USA): Mark's younger brother and early pioneer of Cape Verde.
- Tonky Frans (BON): 3rd world freestyle 2009. 1st Midwinters Merit Island Freestyle Competition in 2001.
- Jean-Patrick van der Wolde (NED): IFCA Junior World Champion of 2011.
- Mike Waltz (USA): first to put a windsurfing sail on a surfboard and sail the famed Hookipa beach on Maui in 1979. This shifted the entire sport from the original 370 cm (12 ft) long boards to the shorter boards ridden today. Mike also hosted Maui's first professional wave sailing and slalom event in 1981, which became the foundation of the windsurfing world tour, and Maui became the mecca for the sport both as a design center and a training ground for professionals.
- Dave Kalama (USA): Although known for his big wave surfing and stand-up surfing accomplishments, he is an outstanding windsurfer and invented the move known as the Goiter.
- Matt Schweitzer(USA): First World Champion (1974), and winner of 18 World Championship level events in subsequent years.
- Josh Stone (USA): freestyle pioneer, inventor of the Spock, PWA Freestyle World Champion in 1999, 2000.
- Ricardo Campello (VEN): a freestyle innovator, he created many difficult moves, PWA Freestyle World Champion in 2003, 2004, and 2005.
- Kauli Seadi (BRA): pioneered freestyle maneuvers in wave competition. Ranked first in PWA Wave competition in 2005, 2007, 2008.
- Gollito Estredo (VEN): 9 time PWA Freestyle World Champion 2005, 2006, 2008, 2009, 2010, 2014, 2015, 2017, 2018, innovator of many new freestyle tricks.
- Thomas Traversa (FRA): PWA Wave World Champion 2014, 1st RedBull Storm Chase.
- Steven van Broeckhoven(NED): European Freestyle Champion 2010, PWA Freestyle World Champion 2011.
- Philip Köster (GER): 5 x Wave World Champion 2011, 2012, 2015, 2017, 2019.
- Víctor Fernández (ESP): Wave World Champion 2010, 2016, and 2018.
- Marcilio Browne (BRA): 4 x Wave World Champion 2013, 2022, 2023, 2024, 2 x Aloha Classic Champion, IWT BIG WAVE Most Radical All Time Champion 2020, PWA Freestyle World Champion 2008.
- Boujmaa Guilloul (MOR): 1st PWA event Hawaii Pro wave 2004, 2014 1st AWT Pro Fleet – Starboard Severne Aloha Classic, 9th PWA Starboard Severne Aloha Classic, 2010 ranked 20th overall PWA Wave, 2009 8th Cabo Verde Wave, 2008 ranked 19th overall PWA Wave, 2007 ranked 14th Wave, came 5th in Guincho. 1st Aloha Classic 2014, 2nd IWT Wave Overall Pro Men 2015, 1st IWT Wave Overall Pro Men 2016.
- Camille Juban (GDE): IWT BIG WAVE All-Time BIGGEST WAVE RIDER Champion 2020 (video), 2 x Aloha Classic Champion 2011 and 2018. 3 time AWT overall Pro Men Wavesailing champion 2012, 2013 and 2015.
- Bernd Roediger (USA): 2 x Aloha Classic Champion 2012 (youngest ever winner at 16 years old), 2013.
- Frank Ervin: Formula windsurfing lightweight world champion.
- Morgan Noireaux (USA): 3 x Aloha Classic Champion 2014, 2015, 2017. IWT overall Pro Men Wavesailing champion 2017.
- Antoine Martin (GDE): 2 x Aloha Classic Champion 2019 & 2023, 2 x IWT Wave Champion 2018, 2019, French National Wave Champion 2019.
- Robby Swift (GB) Competing internationally in the PWA World Tour as a wave/freestyle sailor. He was the Youth World Champion, in Racing and Slalom 2000.

=== Top women ===
- Jill Boyer (USA): World Wave Champion 1984.
- Julie de Werd (USA): World Wave Champion 1984.
- Clare Seeger (GBR): One of the top female windsurfers in the 1980s. She was also No 1 British Champion for 10yrs and was the first Briton to obtain and overall World Title. Clare won numerous events around the World until finally settling in Hawaii. She was one of the first women who did forward loops, push loops and was the first person to do a double back loop at Ho'okipa, Maui, Hawaii.
- Lisa Penfield (USA): Freestyle World Champion 1985, multiple Championships from 1981– 1986.
- Dana Dawes (USA): World Wave Champion 1986, 1987.
- Natalie Siebel (GER): World Wave Champion 1986, 1988, 1990, 1992, 1994.
- Angela Cocheran (USA): World Wave Champion 1989, 1991.
- Natalie Lelievre (FRA): overall World Champion, 1984, 1985. World Wave Champion 1995, 1996, 1997.
- Barbara Kendall (NZ): 3 time Olympian representing New Zealand with Gold in Barcelona 1992, Silver in Atlanta 1996, Bronze in Sydney 2000.
- Jessica Crisp (AUS): 5 time Olympian representing Australia. PWA Overall World Champion 1994. PWA World Wavesailing Champion 1993.
- Karin Jaggi (SUI): multiple PWA World Champion in freestyle, wave, speed competition, 1990s and 2000s. World Wave Champion 1998.
- Daida Ruano Moreno (ESP): PWA Wave World Champion, 2000, 2001, 2002, 2003, 2004, 2005, 2008, 2009, 2010, 2011, 2013. Freestyle World Champion 2003–2006. The Most dominant female athlete in the history of wavesailing.
- Iballa Ruano Moreno (ESP): PWA Wave World Champion, 1999, 2006, 2007, 2012, 2014, 2015, 2016, 2017, 2018. Twin sister of Daida Moreno.
- Sarah-Quita Offringa (ARU): 25-time World Champion (15 Freestyle, 5 Slalom, 4 Wave & 1 Slalom-X), 3 x Aloha Classic Wave Champion 2016, 2019, 2023.
- Sarah Hauser (NCL): IWT BIG WAVE All-Time BIGGEST WAVE RIDER Champion 2020 (photo), 3 x Aloha Classic Wave Champion 2017, 2018, 2024, 3 x IWT Wave Champion 2015, 2016, 2018.
- Jenna Gibson (GBR): Women's Speed World Record Holder (48.03 knots over 500m). First woman to go over 50 knots peak speed. 4 x IFCA Slalom World Champion.

== In popular culture ==
Due to the popularity of the sport in the 1970s, a song "Windsurfin'" was written by publisher Willem van Kooten and producer Jaap Eggermont. It sold over 200,000 copies and made it to no. 2 in the Netherlands in 1978. It was also a hit in Belgium and Germany.

== Related water sports ==
Other watersport variants using a board and wind power include Kiteboarding and Wingsurfing.

Kiteboarding uses a large kite (around 9 to 20qsm) on 20+m lines for wind power. Due to the strong possible upward lift, smaller boards with no significant buoyancy are used.

Wingsurfing or wing foiling uses a hand-held wing, a smaller version of a kite, to replace the sail. To offset the low wind power resulting from the comparatively small wing size (around 3 to 9 sqm), a Foilboard can be used.

Windfoiling mounts in the fin box a hydrofoil which lifts the board off the water and improves speeds due to reduced drag.

== See also ==
- Kite ice skating — ice skater propelled by kite
- Land sailing — yacht with wheels
- Land windsurfing — on large skateboard, propelled by sail
- Wakeboarding — water skiing on a board instead of skis
- Waterskiing
