= Formula Foil Windsurfing World Championships =

Windsurfing world championships in formula class

The Formula Foil Windsurfing class is a group of production equipment used for an annual Formula Foil Windsirfung World Championships these were organized by the host club on behalf of the International Formaula Foil Windsurfing Class Association (part of International Windsurfer Association) and recognized by World Sailing, the sports IOC recognized governing body.

== Events ==
Event			Host			Category	Participation				Ref.
Ed.	Dates	Year	Host club	Location	Country	Category			Nat.	Cont	Ref.
1	30Jun -6Jul	2019	Polish Windsurfing Association	Puck	Poland	Open	52	5	15	2	
2	17-22 Aug	2020	PL Sports Consulting GmbH	Silvaplana	Switzerland	Male	133	N/A	20	4	
2	17-22 Aug	2020	PL Sports Consulting GmbH	Silvaplana	Switzerland	Female	N/A	29	10	3	
3	24Nov -4Dec	2021	Clube Naval da Praia da Vitoria	Praia da Vitória, Terceira Island, Azores	Portugal	Open	15	0	4	1	
4	17-22 Jun	2022	Circolo Surf Torbole	Nago–Torbole, Lake Garda	Italy	Open	40	5	13	3	
4	17-22 Jun	2022	Circolo Surf Torbole	Nago–Torbole, Lake Garda	Italy	Open Youth	11	2	2	1	
5	16-21 Jun	2023	Circolo Surf Torbole	Nago–Torbole, Lake Garda	Italy	Open	48	5	15	2	
6	17-22 Jun	2024	Polskie Stowarzyszenie Windsurfingu	[[]]	Poland	Male	61	N/A	10	2	
6	17-22 Jun	2024	Polskie Stowarzyszenie Windsurfingu	[[]]	Poland	Female	N/A	6	2	1	
6	17-22 Jun	2024	Polskie Stowarzyszenie Windsurfingu	[[]]	Poland	Open Youth	29	20	3	1	
7	9-13 Sep	2025	Circolo Surf Torbole	Nago–Torbole, Lake Garda	Italy	Open	34	2	13	3	
8	15-19 Sep	2026		Guarapari, Espirito Santo State	Brazil	Open	18	3	5	2	

== Medalists Open/Male ==
Year	Gold	Silver	Bronze	1st Female	Ref.
2019	Steve Allen (AUS)	Maciek Rutkowski (POL)	Wojtek Brzozowski (POL)	32nd / Marina Alabau (ESP)	
2020	Nicolas Goyard (FRA)	Przemyslaw Miarczynski (POL)	Pierre Mortefon (FRA)	Separate Female Fleet	
2021	Nicolas Goyard (FRA)	Thomas Goyard (FRA)	Luuc Van Opzeeland (NED)	None Entered	
2022	Nicolas Goyard (FRA)	Thomas Goyard (FRA)	Elia Colombo (SUI)	23rd / Sofia Renna (ITA)	
2023	Elia Colombo (SUI)	Jacopo Renna (ITA)	Tomasz Romanowski (POL)	12th / Helle Oppedal (NOR)	
2024	Stanislaw Trepczyński (POL)	Dominik Lewinski (POL)	Michał Maziarka (POL)	Separate Female Fleet	
2025	Fabian Wolf (GER)	Theo Peter (AUT)	Frederic Ramsgaard (DEN)	33rd / Laura Urbanski (POL)	
2026	Miguel Martinho (POR)	Pawel Dittrich (POL)	Jan Klimaszyk (POL)	4th / Giovanna Prada (BRA)	

== Medalists Female Fleet ==
Year	Gold	Silver	Bronze	Ref.
2020 - Female	Hélene Noesmoen (FRA)	Maja Dziarnowska (POL)	Lilian De Geus (NED)	
2024 - Female	Maja Kuchta (POL)	Martyna Duzowska (POL)	Kristýna Pinosová (CZE)	

== Medalists Youth Fleet ==
Year	Gold	Silver	Bronze	1st Female	Ref.
2022	LEONARDO TOMASINI (ITA)	MATTIA SAONCELLA (ITA)	VALENTINO BLEWETT (ITA)	11th / Anna POLETTINI (ITA)	
2024	Leon Jankowski (POL)	Gustaw Trybek (POL)	Adam Kelar (POL)	8th / Julia Przybył (POL)	

== Other Links ==
- Formula Windsurfing World Championship
- iQFoil World Championships
- Formula Wing World Championships
- Formula Kite World Championships
