= Christine Johnston (sailor) =

British windsurfer (born 1975)

Personal information
- Full name: Christine Susan Johnston
- Nationality: Great Britain
- Born: 31 March 1975 (age 51) Reading, Berkshire, England, UK
- Height: 1.72 m (5 ft 8 in)
- Weight: 66 kg (146 lb)

Sailing career
- Sport: Sailing
- Classes: Formula Windsurfing, Mistral, Raceboard, RS:X, Techno 293, Funboard
Medal record
World Championships
Gold medal – first place	2003 Formula Windsurfing
Bronze medal – third place	2002 Funboard

Christine Susan Johnston (born 31 March 1975) is a British windsurfer. She competed for Great Britain in the 2000 Summer Olympics, finishing 18th in women's Mistral One Design class. She won the 2003 Formula Windsurfing World Championships After retiring from professional sailing she went on to sell equipment and teach the new discipline of kite surfing.
