= Windsurfing harness =

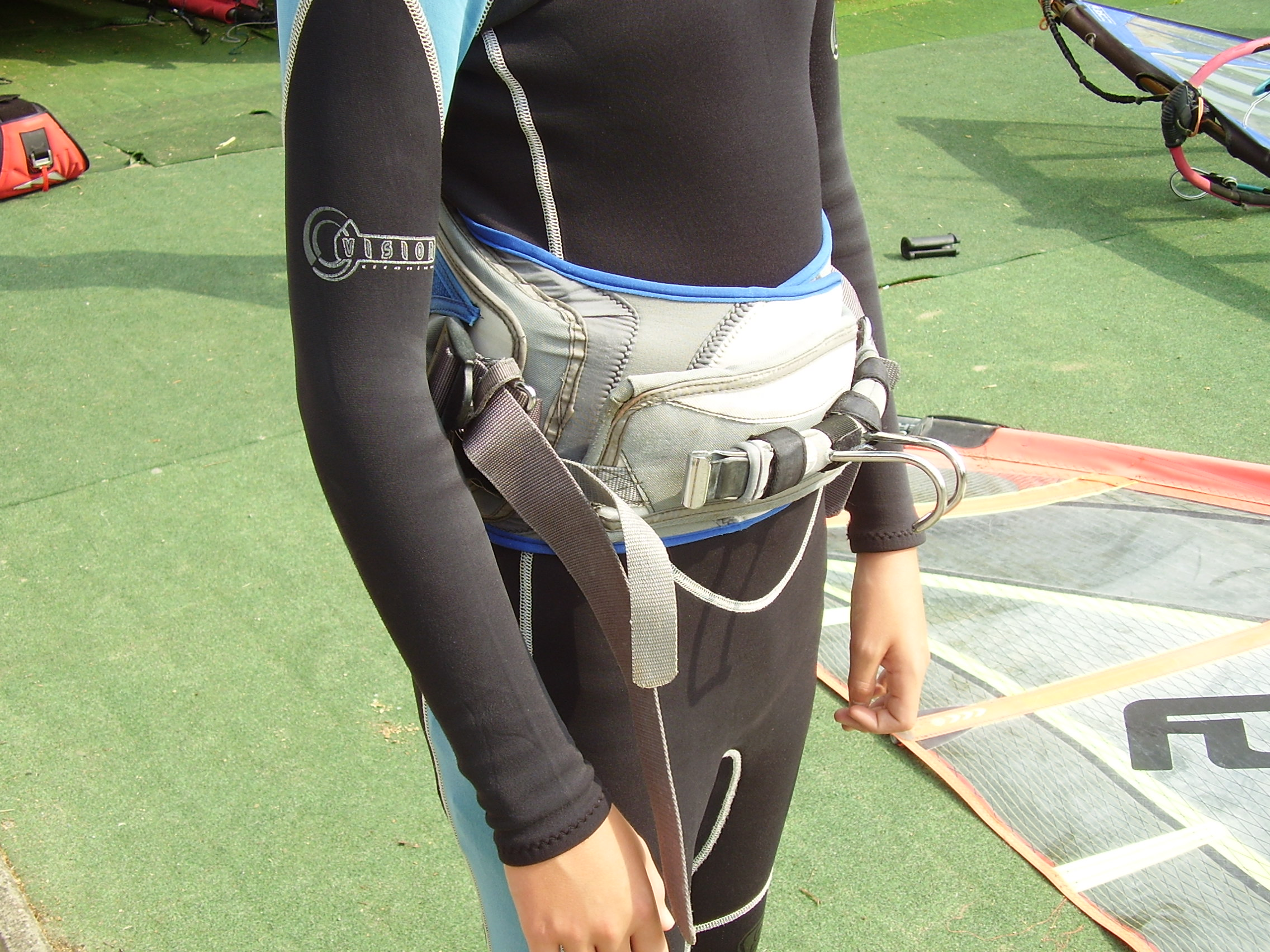
A windsurfing waist harness.

A windsurfing harness is part of the trapeze used in the sports of windsurfing and kitesurfing to connect the rider to the rig by a line attached to the boom or kitesurfing bar. It consists of a girdle-like contraption that is worn around the body, with a hook for attachment. Hooking-in the harness is done by pulling the sail toward the body and hooking into the harness lines on the boom. The harness turns windsurfing into a long lasting activity, taking the weight of the sail off the arms of the windsurfer.

== Types of harnesses ==
There are four basic types of harnesses:

- The waist harness: Worn around the waist and lower back, providing back support.
- Crossover Harness (e.g. Dakine XT) Fits around the backside but has padding and support for the back as well.
- The seat (or slalom) harness: Fits around the backside, with straps that pass between the legs.
- The chest harness: Fits over the chest like a vest, providing buoyancy and padding for protection.

== History and development ==
The first truly functional harness was developed by Pat Love and Ken Kleid of Windsurfing Hawaii in Kailua, Hawaii in about 1974. It consisted of a vest-like nylon jacket to which a hook was attached. The sailor used the hook to attach to lines attached to each of the wishbone booms.

When future world champion Robby Naish began using a harness in Kailua in 1975 when he was twelve years old, he had problems with his chest being painfully squeezed by the force on the hook. Mike Horgan and Larry Stanley developed a spreader bar to balance the load and prevent the harness from squeezing the wearer's chest. The spreader bar is now in almost universal use.

The seat harness was developed on Maui when young Ian Boyd experienced the same problems mentioned above as Robbie Naish. The solution, half in jest, was to wear a chest harness upside-down with the hook inverted. Barry Holopeter was an R&D expert for Da Kine, and developed the first working model. This design proved to be very efficient in speed sailing and was used by Fred Haywood in his world speed-record runs.

Many companies have developed the harness over the years with major innovations coming from DaKine and Windsurfing Hawaii.

== External links and references ==
- Watertrader magazine Looking Cool & Improving Technique Online tutorial
- Windsurfing
- Windsurfing Clip Harness Lines Moudled and flexible Plastic lines, Next generation of more reliable windsurf harness lines
