= Christine Johnston =

Christine Johnston may refer to:

- Christine Johnston (comedian), writer and performer, part of the Australian musical comedy trio The Kransky Sisters
- Christine Johnston (writer) (born 1950), novelist from New Zealand
- Christine Johnston (sailor) (born 1975), British sailor

== See also ==
- Agnes Christine Johnston (1896–1978), American screenwriter
