= Hookipa (board game) =

Board game

Hookipa is a board game published in 1986 by Activé Games.

== Contents ==
Hookipa is a game in which there are two games, one on each side of the board: the first consists of racing miniature sailboards around marker buoys, while on the other side of the board is Hookipa Bay where the boards race around six buoys.

== Reception ==
John Humphries reviewed Hookipa for Games International magazine, and gave it 3 stars out of 5, and stated that "the game is likely to appeal more to the aficionados of the sport rather than to your average landlubber."
