= Hoʻokipa =

Beach in Hawaii, United States

Coordinates: 20.933214°N 156.357524°W

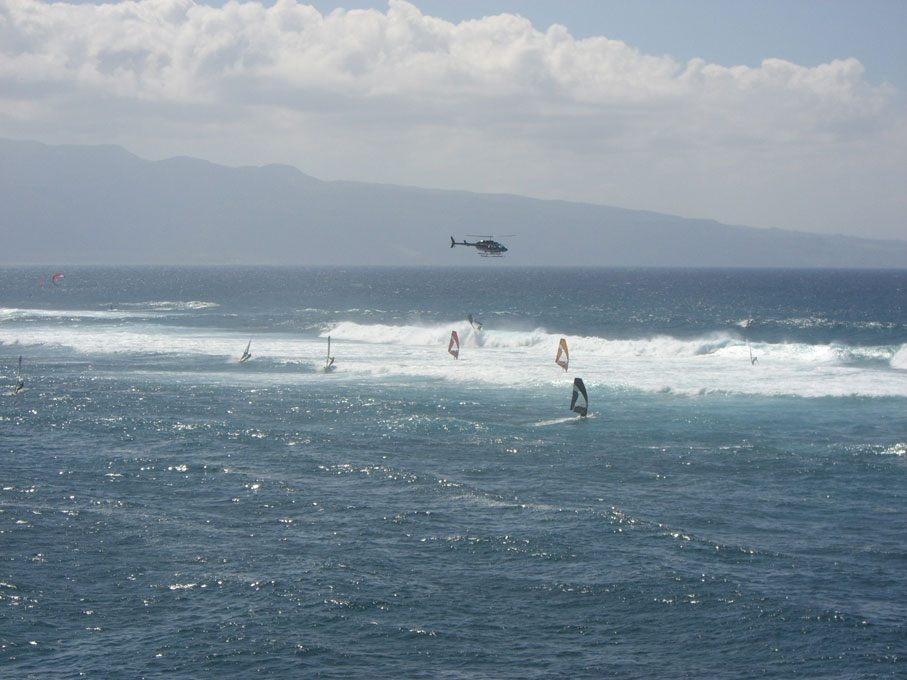
Windsurfers in the waves during high surf at Ho'okipa, April 2006

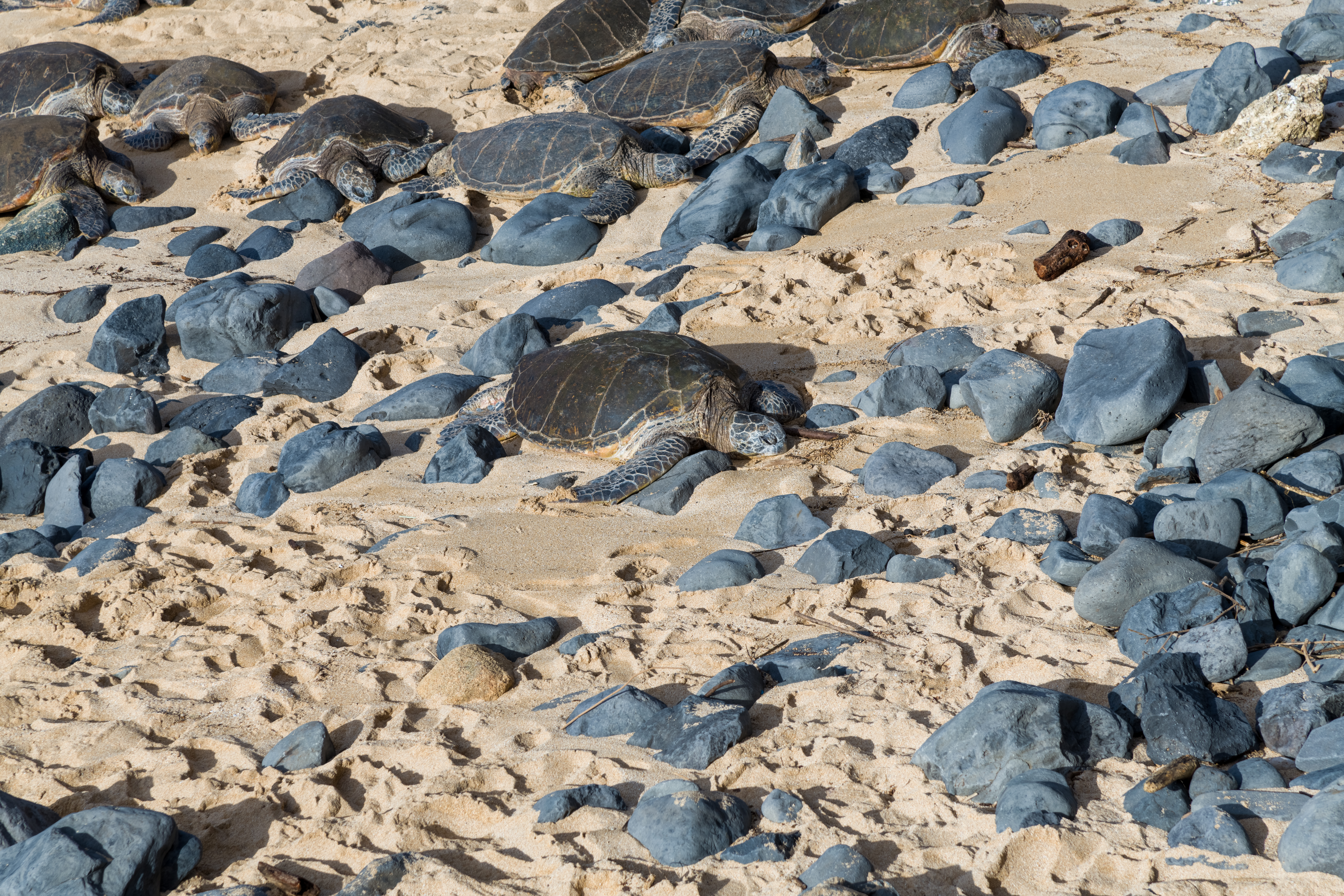
Turtles drying at Ho'okipa Beach Park

Hoʻokipa is a beach on the north shore of Maui, Hawaii, renowned as one of the best windsurfing sites in the world. A combination of large, well-shaped waves breaking across a system of reefs that extend across the bay and consistently strong winds make it ideal for the sport. Waves there are largest during the winter, smaller in summer. In addition to windsurfing competitions, surfing contests are held there as well.

The name Hoʻokipa means "hospitality" in Hawaiian. Hoʻokipa Beach Park is located on Maui's North Shore alongside the Hana Highway. There are picnic facilities and observation decks for visitors.

== Surf breaks ==
There are four distinct surf breaks at Ho'okipa. Pavilions is the break furthest east, off the lookout parking. West from it, facing the main parking, is Middles break. Pavilions is mostly a right but also has a shorter left, and Middles is usually surfed as a left. The area between the two, which is in the channel, catches fewer breaking sets and is sometimes referred to as Girlie Bowls. Next further west is Green Trees, followed by The Point, facing the lifeguard tower and the narrow sand beach launch. It is the most popular break for windsurfing, and generally breaks as a right. With the prevailing trade wind direction being east to east-north-east, these are most frequently starboard tack down-the-line conditions (wind from right when standing on the beach). Yet further west, past the rocky point, is Lanes, which generally breaks as a left. Under relatively rare conditions, known as Kona, the prevailing winds become southwest, creating port tack down-the-line conditions at Lanes (wind from left when standing on the beach). This only occurs a few days out of every year.

== Attractions ==
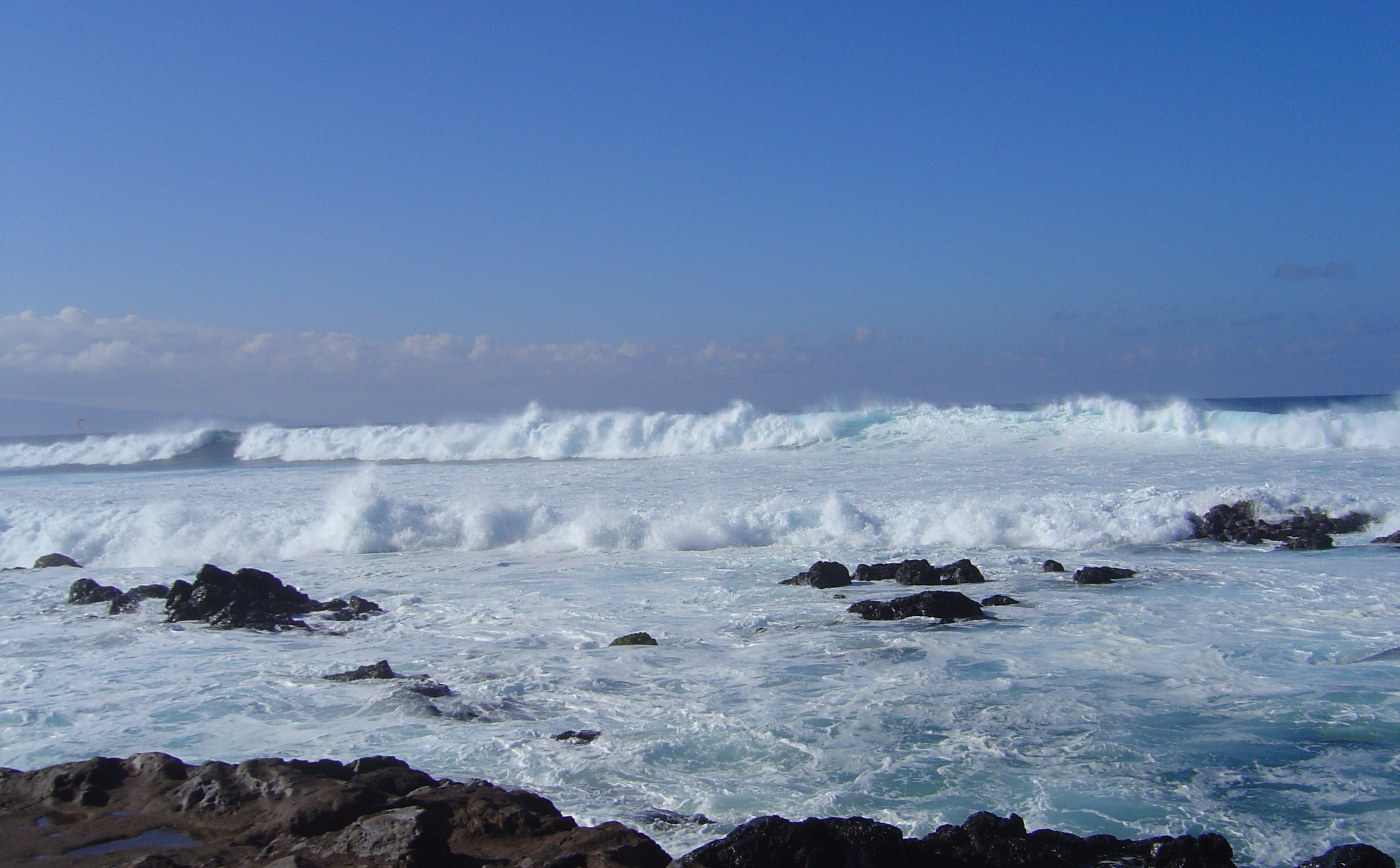
High surf at Ho'okipa

Over the years Ho'okipa has been the site for organized windsurfing competitions in the Wave discipline. A long-running annual event is the Aloha Classic, a Pro-Am competition with age categories for contestants. The Red Bull King of the Air international kitesurfing competition was held at Ho'okipa from 1999-2005.

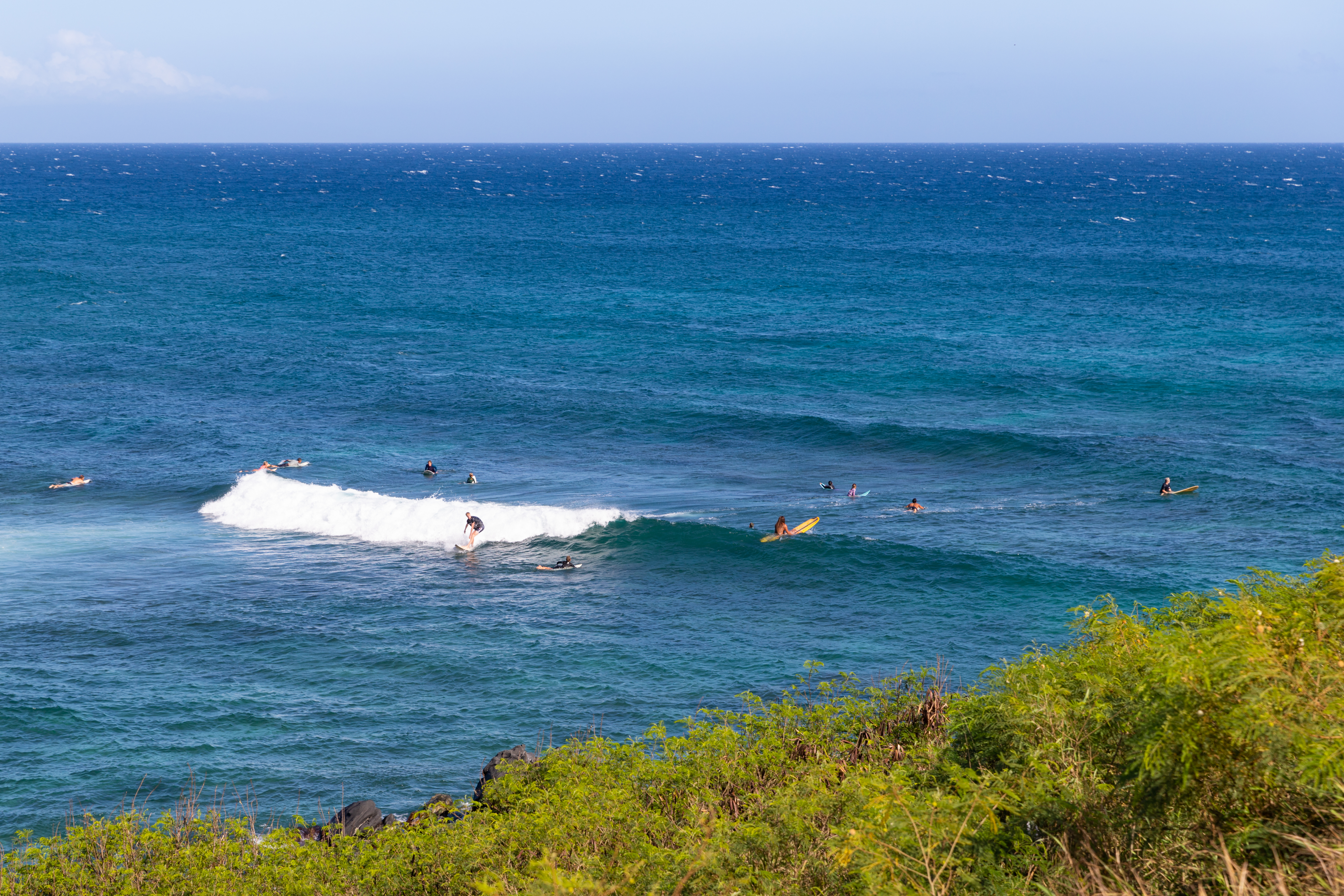
Hookipa Beach, surfing on Maui, Hawaii

Like many locations on the Maui and Oahu North Shore, Ho'okipa Beach is occasionally a tourist attraction in the winter time because of spectacularly large surf. In the afternoon on 15 December 2004, for example, tourists visited the beach to see waves as large as 30 feet (9.1 m) pound the shore; officials warned visitors to stay away from the water, as the surf was very deadly. Despite this, Ho'okipa is not an ideal site for true big-wave riding, as the waves close out when their faces approach about 25 feet (7.6 m). During such episodes, other deep-water breaks offer more rideable waves (an example of which is Jaws, offshore Peahi, Maui, which is a very short car ride from Hookipa.)
