= Robby Swift =

British Professional Windsurfer (born 1984)

Robby Swift (K-89) is a British Professional Windsurfer. (born 1984 in Great Britain). Competing internationally in the PWA World Tour as a wave/freestyle sailor. He is currently team rider for Neil Pryde and JP Australia and sponsored by many other companies such as Mystic Windsurfing. He is named after the legend Robby Naish. He was the Youth World Champion, in Racing and Slalom 2000.
