= Adam Warchol =

Polish big wave surfer and windsurfer

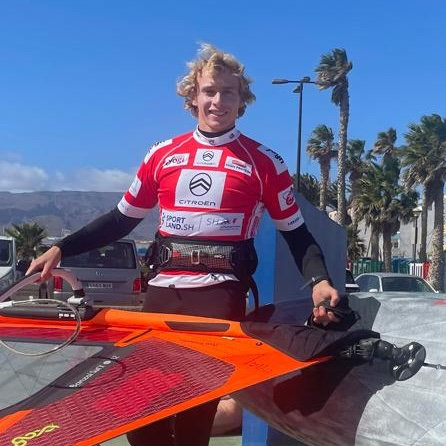

Personal information
- Born: Adam Warchoł; September 26, 2001 (age 24) Warsaw, Poland
- Years active: 2010–present
- Height: 6ft (1.82m)
- Weight: 167.55 lb (76 kg)
- Website: https://www.instagram.com/adamwarcholpol111

Surfing career
- Sport: Surfing
- Best year: 2021
- Sponsors: Goya Windsurfing, Quatro Windsurfing, KTsurboards, Surf Stick Bell, United Families, Baltica, Akademia Surfingu
- Major achievements: Guinness World Record for largest wave ever windsurfed (pending)

Surfing specifications
- Stance: Goofy
- Shaper: Keith Teboul
- Quiver: KT
- Favourite waves: Jaws, Topocalma, Punta de Lobos, Ho’okipa, Hierbabuena, La Perouse

Adam Warchoł (born September 26, 2001, in Warsaw) is a Polish big wave surfer and windsurfer. The first Polish athlete to reach the podium in the PWA World Tour, in the under-20 category. He is also the winner of International Windsurfing Tour (IWT) competitions in two categories.

Holder of the largest waves ever windsurfed—measuring 62 feet (19.5meters) — at Jaws, Hawaii, one of the world's biggest and most dangerous waves.

== Life ==
At the age of six he moved to Tarifa, Spain, where he began his journey into the big waves.

== Career highlights and achievements ==
- Holder of the 62-foot wave (19,5 m). When officially ratified, it would surpass the biggest wave ever windsurfed.
- 2x podium @PWA World Windsurfing Championship Under 20
- 2021 IWT Big Wave - Youth Biggest Ride
- 2021 IWT Big Wave - Biggest Wipeout
- Polish Championship @Baltica Polish Surfing Challenge 2021
