= Jason Polakow =

Australian Windsurfer

Jason Polakow (born 10 November 1971 in Torquay, Victoria) is an Australian professional windsurfer from Victoria. He founded the watersports company JP Australia and was the first windsurfer to ride big wave of Nazare, in Portugal. Polakow gained notoriety in 1991 when we won the Marui/O’Neill World Cup Grand Slam contest against Robby Naish becoming the first non-Hawaiian ever to win a World Cup Wave contest in Hawaii. Polakow won the PWA World Tour wave world title in 1997 and 1998.
