= Dorota Staszewska =

Polish windsurfer

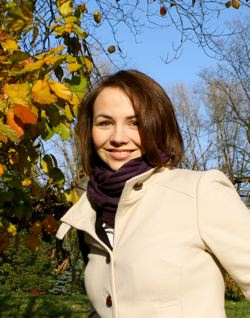

Personal information
- Nationality: Polish
- Born: 2 October 1978 (age 47) Warsaw, Poland

Sport
- Country: Poland
- Sport: Sailing

Dorota Staszewska (born 2 October 1978) is a Polish sports sailor. She was born in Warsaw. She competed at the 1996 Summer Olympics, in women's sailboard.
