= Sarah-Quita Offringa =

Aruban sailor (born 1991)

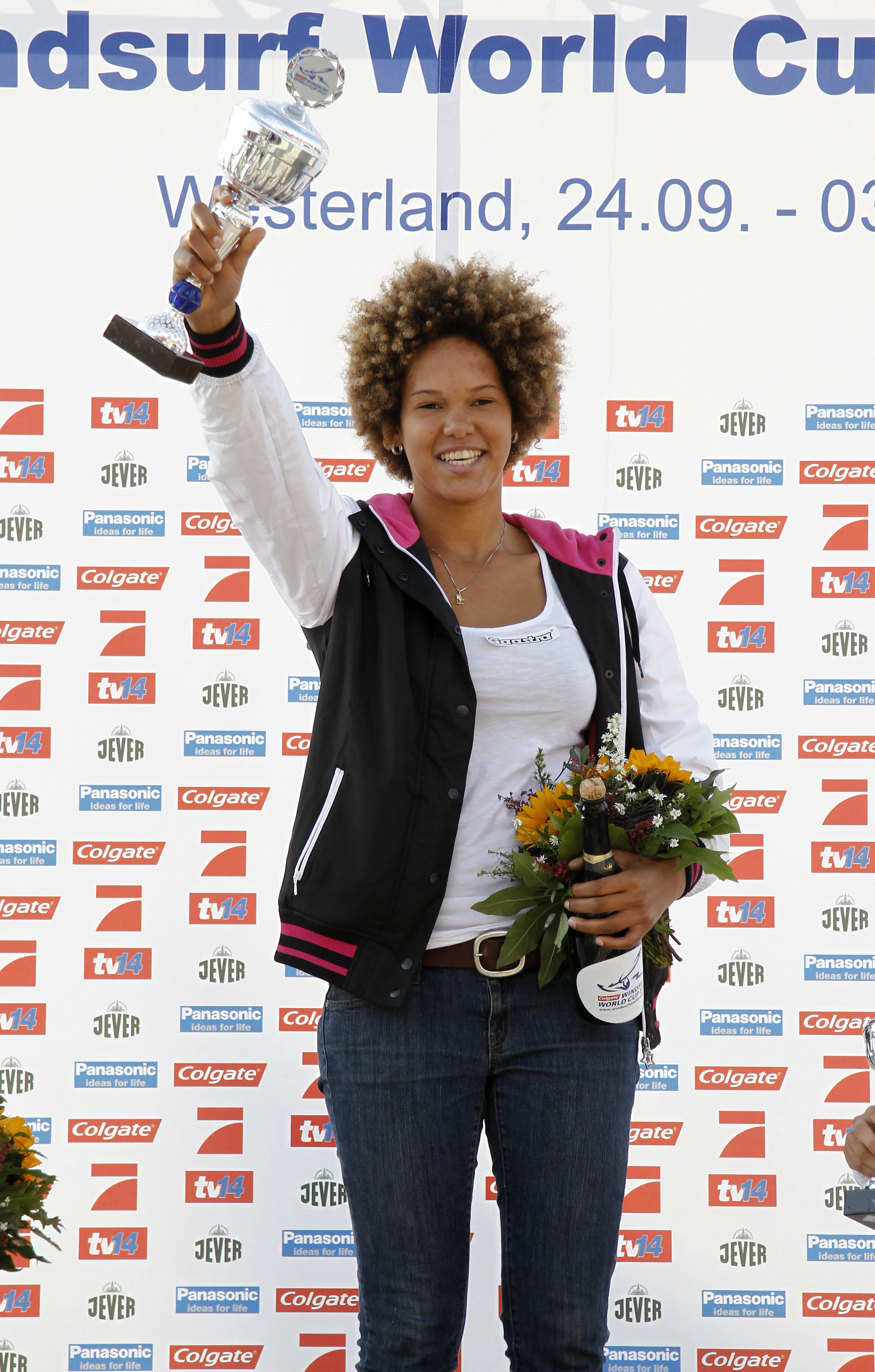
- Born: 4 July 1991 (age 34); Oranjestad, Aruba, Dutch West Indies
- Occupation: Professional Windsurfer

Sarah-Quita Offringa (born 4 July 1991) is an Aruban professional sailor. She competed in the PWA World Tour windsurfing competition. In 2011 following back to back 2010/2011 PWA Women's Freestyle World Championship titles wins together with winning the 2011 PWA Slalom World Championship she was nominated by the International Sailing Federation for the ISAF World Sailor of the Year Awards.
