= Björn Dunkerbeck =

Dutch/Danish windsurfer

Bjørn Dunkerbeck (born 16 July 1969) is a professional windsurfer who has won the Professional Windsurfers Association (PWA) Overall World Championships a record 42 times.

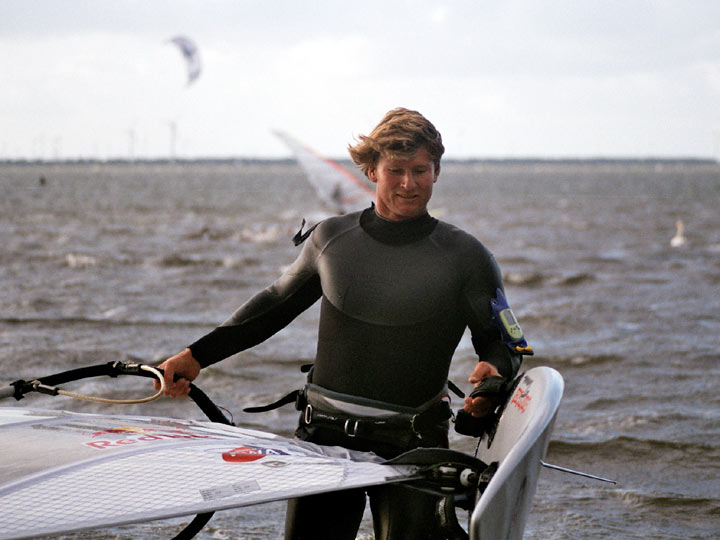
Bjorn Dunkerbeck in the Netherlands during the World Tour (2005)

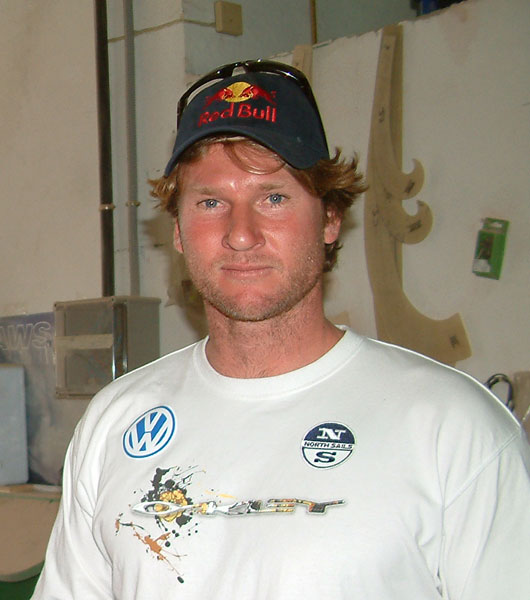
Bjorn Dunkerbeck in Proof board factory

Dunkerbeck is the son of a Dutch father and a Danish mother, but sailed under the Spanish flag number ESP-11, as he grew up in the volcanic archipelago of Canary Islands in Spain. He dominated the late 1980s and the entire 1990s professional scene, especially in racing, but was also a champion in wavesailing.

Both he and his sister Britt have held records for the World Sailing Speed Record Council Nautical Mile. In the 2021 Lüderitz Speed Challenge in Namibia he reached a top speed of 55.97 knots.

== PWA titles ==
- Overall World Champion (1988–1999)
- Race World Champion (1988–1999) and 2001
- Wave World Champion (1990, 1992, 1993, 1994, 1995, 1999, 2001)
- Freestyle World Champion (1998)
- Speed World Champion (1994)

pwa ranking 1996 ( magazine Surf Februari 1997)

1. Björn Dunkerbeck wave 2e racing 1e points 12,2
2. Patrice belbeoc'h wave 1e racing 4e points 26,8
3. Anders bringdal wave 5e racing 2e points 52,0
4. Matt Pritchard wave 11e racing 9e points 98,0
5. Bernd Flessner wave 4e racing 15e points 106,0
