= Formula Windsurfing =

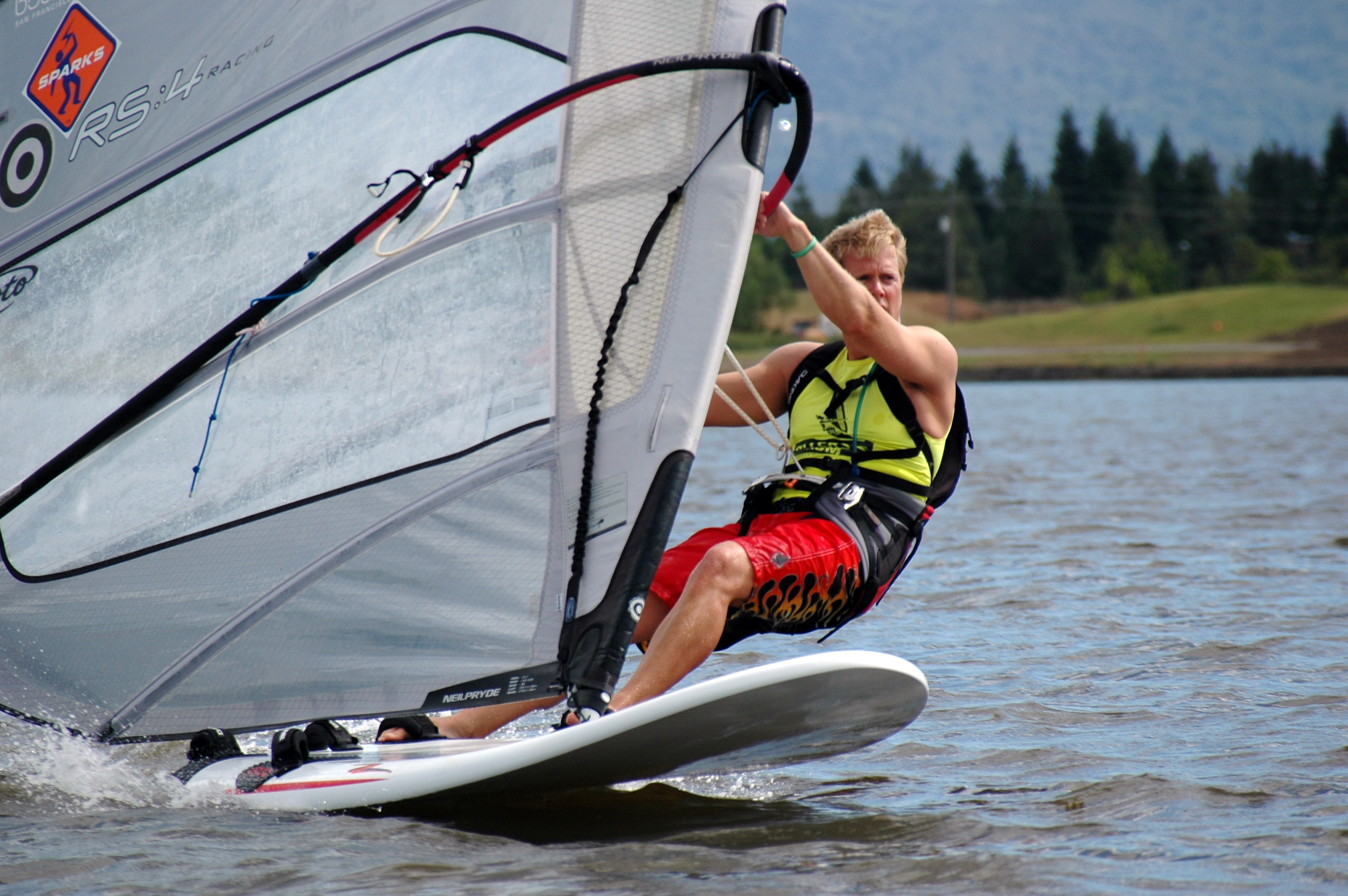
formula racer in San Francisco Bay

Formula Windsurfing is the high-performance, competitive course-racing format of the windsurfing world. This type of sailing boards enjoy a massive wind range that enables racing in winds from 7 to 35 knots, and are capable of reaching speeds of over 30 knots.

== History and beginnings ==
This class of windsurfing was born in the late 1990s as an upgrade from funboard-type course-racing boards looking to lower wind limits, broaden wind strengths and reduce racing costs with a limited quiver.

Historically, board designers used to increase the length and volume of the boards in order to allow for sailing in lighter winds, but during the late 1990s, some brands like AHD, Berky, Drops, ML, Pro-Tech, Roberts and Starboard started to work on alternative solutions. They came up with designs that widened and shortened the board length whilst retaining high volume, and used larger fins to get into planing earlier. They also moved the fins further back, which prompted newer concepts with different solutions around the tail of the board to free the nose and decrease drag. To avoid ventilation in the fin area, flaps or steeped bottoms were used, the latter becoming the more widely adopted due to its durability and ease of use.

Designs like these were only made possible thanks to technological advancements in the fin industry which allowed makers to assemble larger fins (normally 70 cm) that are able to stand the increasing sail size and fin pressure. In few years this concept was widely adopted by almost all Formula Windsurfing board factories.

The concept of Formula Windsurfing as a class was formed by the joint effort of the International Board Sailing Association (IBSA) and the International Funboard Class Association (IFCA), and was successfully pioneered on 24 March 1998 in Brest, France. During the four days of competition the top 20 French funboard sailors raced ten eliminations in winds of 6 to 12 knots. The winner of the event was Erik Thieme on a 2.75m board powered by a 10.0m^2 sail.

During 1999 many national funboard associations included Formula as a discipline in their national racing circuits. Four international Formula regattas were held, including the first Formula World Championships, in Belgium, won by Wojtek Brzozowski from Poland. The Formula Windsurfing Class was adopted as an ISAF "International" class in 2001.

The International Formula Windsurfing Class is controlled by the International Sailing Federation and was launched in 1998. This class introduced rules that restricted competitors to one board with a maximum of three sails and three fins (changed to two fins in 2011). This prompted the designers to create boards with a very wide wind range coupled with excellent upwind and downwind performance.

Formula boards have now been restricted to 1m wide with fins up to 70 cm long and maximum sail sizes of 12.5m^2. By changing the fin length, type and stiffness as well as the sail sizes these boards can be tuned for a wide range of wind and water conditions and suit a variety of different sized sailors.

== Weather conditions ==
The ideal weather conditions for formula windsurfing are flat water with winds of 7 to 25 knots; however, international rules allow racing in up to 35 knots. Sailing in chop and swell is more challenging. Due to the fragile nature of this equipment, windsurfing or launching in breaking waves is to be avoided. Due to fin length, formula boards should not be used in shallow waters.

== Racing ==
A formula windsurfing event is usually made up from a number of races over a given period. Races are run in the same method as conventional sailing races, with a countdown to the start after which competitors can cross an imaginary line between two start markers. Races are usually 15–30 minutes, with up to four races per day (conditions allowing). The winner is the competitor with the best total score for all of the races in the event (although some race results may be discounted depending on number of races sailed and various other factors).

Typical courses include upwind/downwind sausage, triangle or square courses.

== Equipment ==
Formula Windsurfing Class rules for equipment are as follows:

- 1 production board (max 1005mm width)
- 3 sails (with maximum size of 12.5m²)
- 2 fins (with maximum length of 70 cm)

Common sail size vs wind range are as follows (although this various according to personal preference, rider size and weight):

- Large = 12m to be used in winds of 7-15 knots
- Medium = 11m to be used in winds of 12-20 knots
- Small = 10m to be used in winds of 17-35 knots

== Racing against other sailing craft ==
Racing against other windsurfer types and boat types is possible using a handicap system. The most widely recognised handicap system in the world is the Portsmouth Yardstick. Formula boards commonly sail with a handicap equivalent to the 18foot skiff. Currently this is a handicap of 685. Although not a lot of racing between Formula boards and other sailing classes has taken place at the international level, in an event in San Francisco in 2003, Formula sailor Micah Buzianis (USA-34) beat the world's best kiteboarders and 18 ft skiff sailors in the Ronstan Bridge-to-Bridge race, showing the speed of Formula boards against some of the fastest racing craft in sailing.

== Formula Windsurfing throughout the world ==
=== Europe ===
Formula Windsurfing has grown enormously in Europe since its start in France, from a large pool of mostly amateur windsurfers who were missing ease of planing in the thousands of not very windy lakes in continental Europe.

- Czech Republic: the Czech champion using a Slim sail made by the Ostrava (CZ) sail factory, became world champion in Thailand.
- Greece has a very active Formula racing scene since 2000, and 2008 the Greek formula windsurfing association was founded.
- Poland
- Portugal: Is nowadays one of the most active Countries, with a big fleet and had organized several Europeans and World Races.

=== North America ===
In the US, Formula Windsurfing has also developed relatively quickly. Formula windsurf is especially popular in the Miami, South Florida area, with sailors such as Fernando Martinez, Alex Morales, Ron Kern, Mario Diaz, and juniors such as Alex Stankie, and Sergio Cremisini representing the sport. Recently it has sprung up in events held in Hood River, Oregon and San Francisco, California.

=== Latin America ===
- Brazil has a very active Formula racing scene, and has hosted two Formula Windsurfing world championships.
- Argentina has had the #1 ranked Formula racer in the world (ARG-3 Gonzalo Costa Hoevel).
- Peru hosted the Formula Windsurfing World Youth and Masters in 2009.

=== Asia/Australia ===
- Formula Windsurfing is extremely popular in Australia. NSW Windsurfing Series and Nationals are held every year.
- Melbourne, Australia hosted the 2005 Formula Windsurfing World Championships.
- Formula Windsurfers have made Japan a growing area for the sport.

=== Middle East ===
- The UAE has also invested in the sport.
