= Robby Naish =

American athlete and entrepreneur (born 1963)

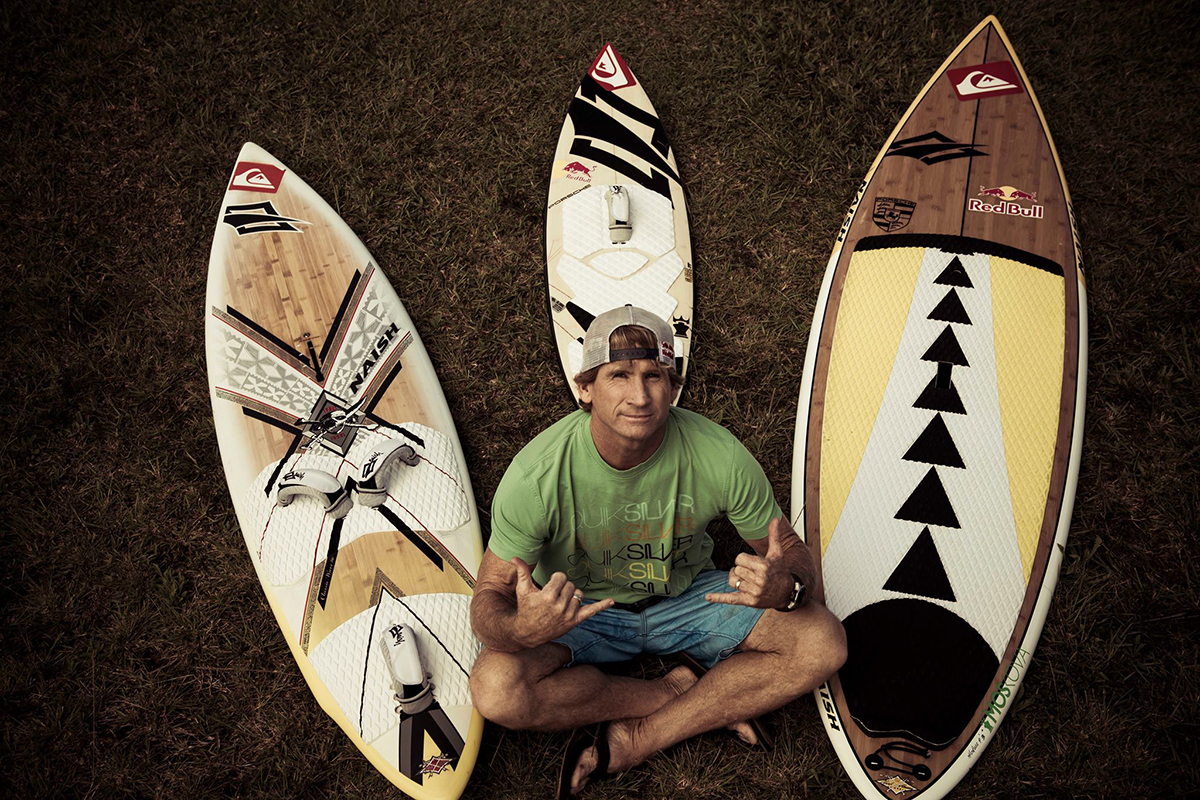

Personal information
- Full name: Robert Staunton Naish
- Born: April 23, 1963 (age 63) La Jolla, California
- Occupation: Athlete
- Years active: 1974-Present
- Height: 5’10”
- Weight: 175 lb (79 kg)
- Spouses: Bitsy Kelley (m. 1981, div. 1987), Kathryn Lipp (m. 1991; div. 2019)
- Website: www.naish.com

Sport
- Sport: Windsurfing, Kiteboarding, Stand-up Paddling, Foiling, Wing-Surfing

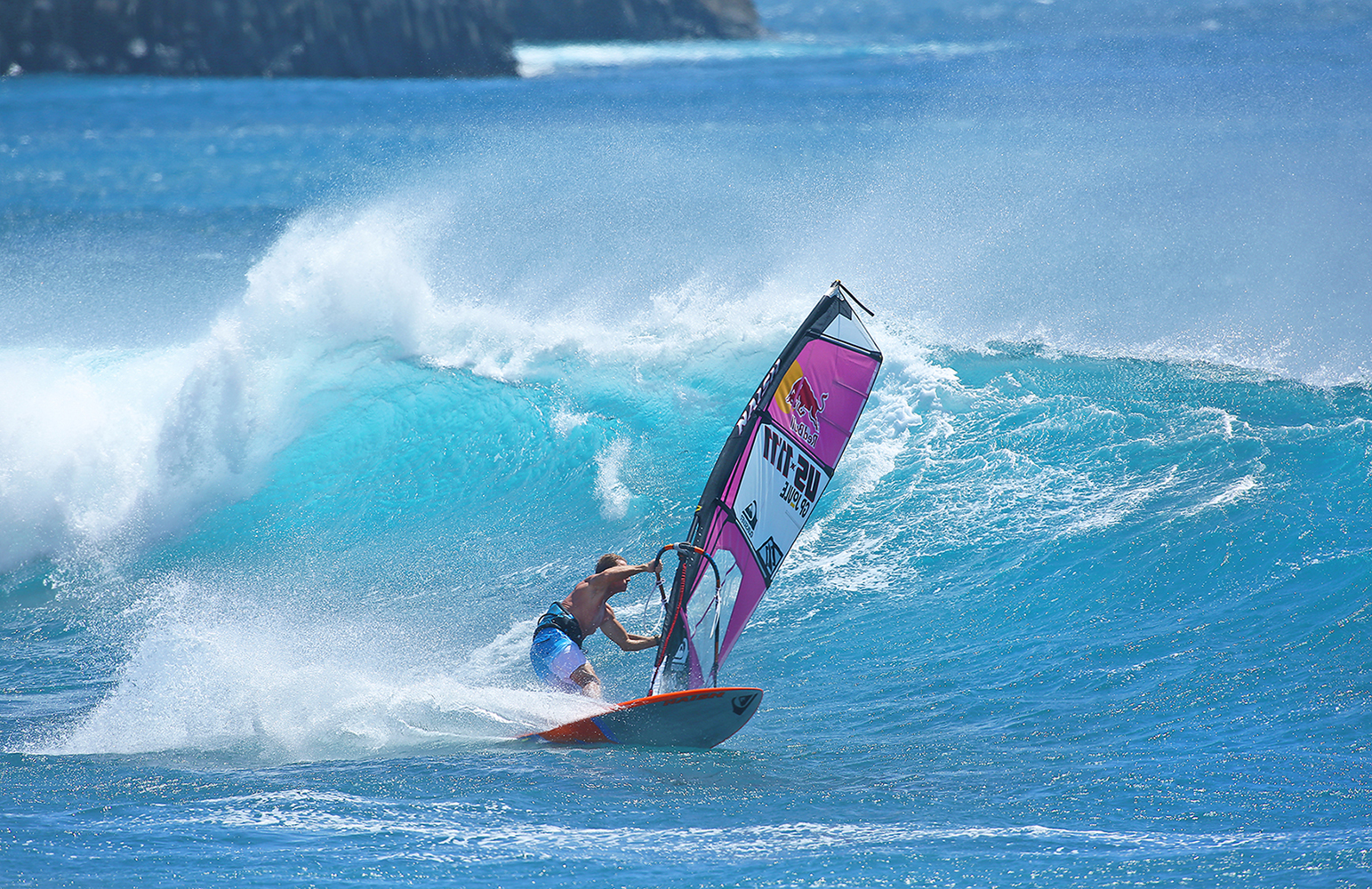
Robby Naish, La Perouse Bay, Maui, Hawaii 9-8-2019

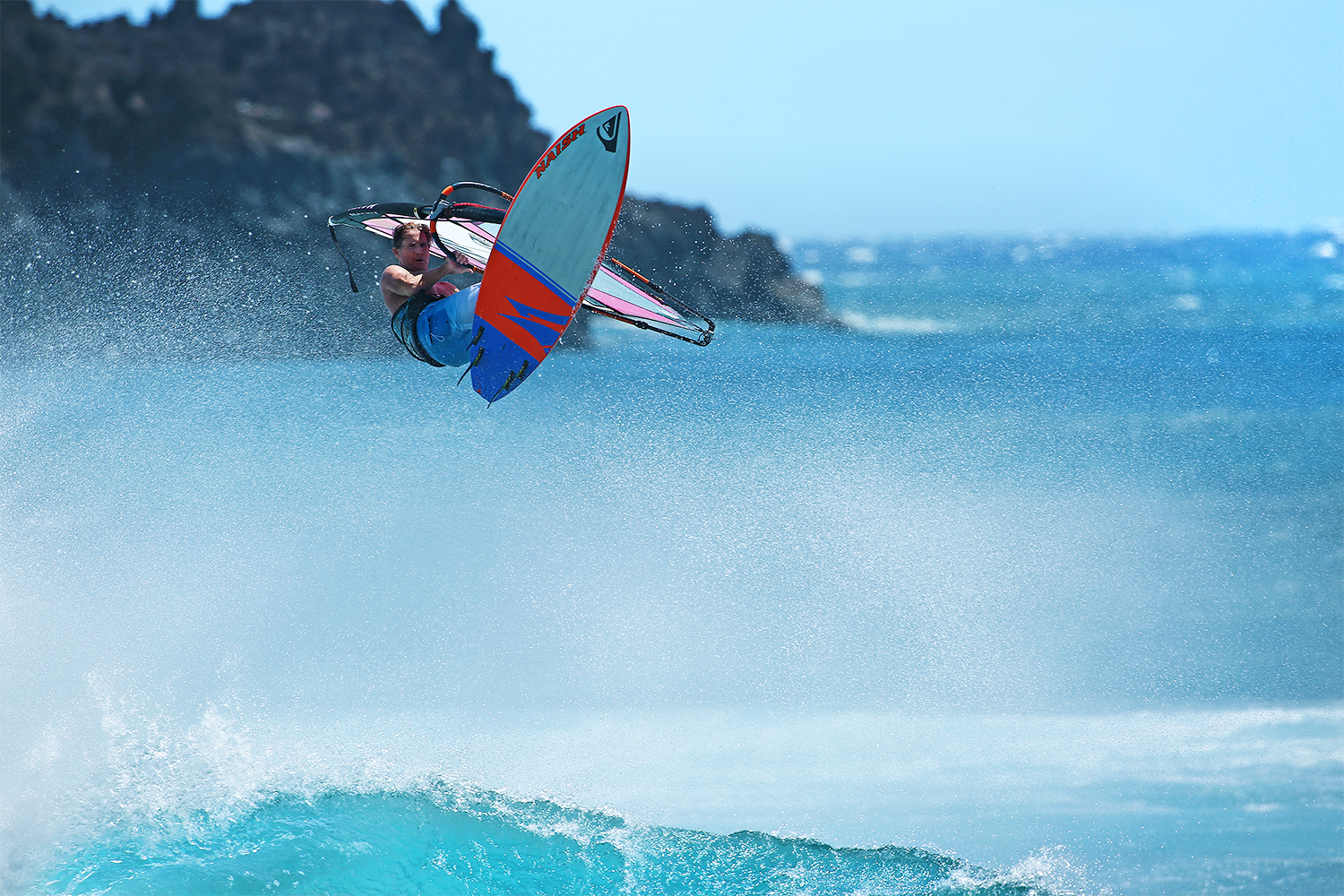
Robby Naish, Windsurfing, Aerial, La Perouse Bay, Maui, Hawaii, 9-8-2019

Robert Staunton Naish (born April 23, 1963 in La Jolla, San Diego, California) is an American athlete and entrepreneur who has won 24 World Championship Windsurfing titles. He is also considered a pioneer of kiteboarding and standup paddleboarding.

In 1976, Naish won his first world championship in windsurfing at age 13 in the Bahamas. Since then, he has been featured in films, videos, news reports, and articles. In 1996, Naish founded Naish Sails Hawaii, which manufactures and sells sailboards, sails, kitesurfing equipment, stand up paddle boards and paddles, hydrofoils, foilboards, and wing-surfers. In 2023 the Naish board business was sold to Kubus Sports.

== Sponsors ==
- Red Bull

== Awards ==
- 1976 Windsurf World Champion
- 24-times Windsurfing World Champion
- 1998 Kiteboarding Slalom World Champion
- 1999 Kiteboarding Slalom and Jumping World Champion
- 2000 “Lifetime Achievement Award” and “Kiteboarder of the Year” at NEA International Sports Awards Munich, Germany
- 2000 “Boarder of the Millennium” at the French Boarder Awards
- 2002 PWA Hall of Fame Induction
- 2012 “Lifetime Achievement Award” at the Nuit de la Glisse
- 2017 National Sailing Hall of Fame
- 2019 Hawaii Waterman Hall of Fame Induction
- 2021 Windsurfing Hall of Fame Induction
- Founding Member of the Laureus World Sports Academy
- 6-time Surfer of the Year (German SURF Magazine)
