= Extreme sport =

Class of sport

Examples of extreme sports

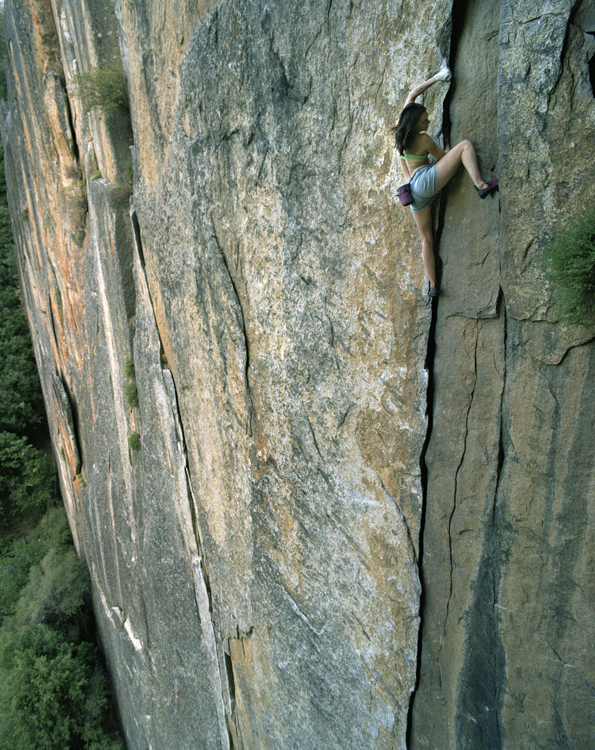
Free solo climbing

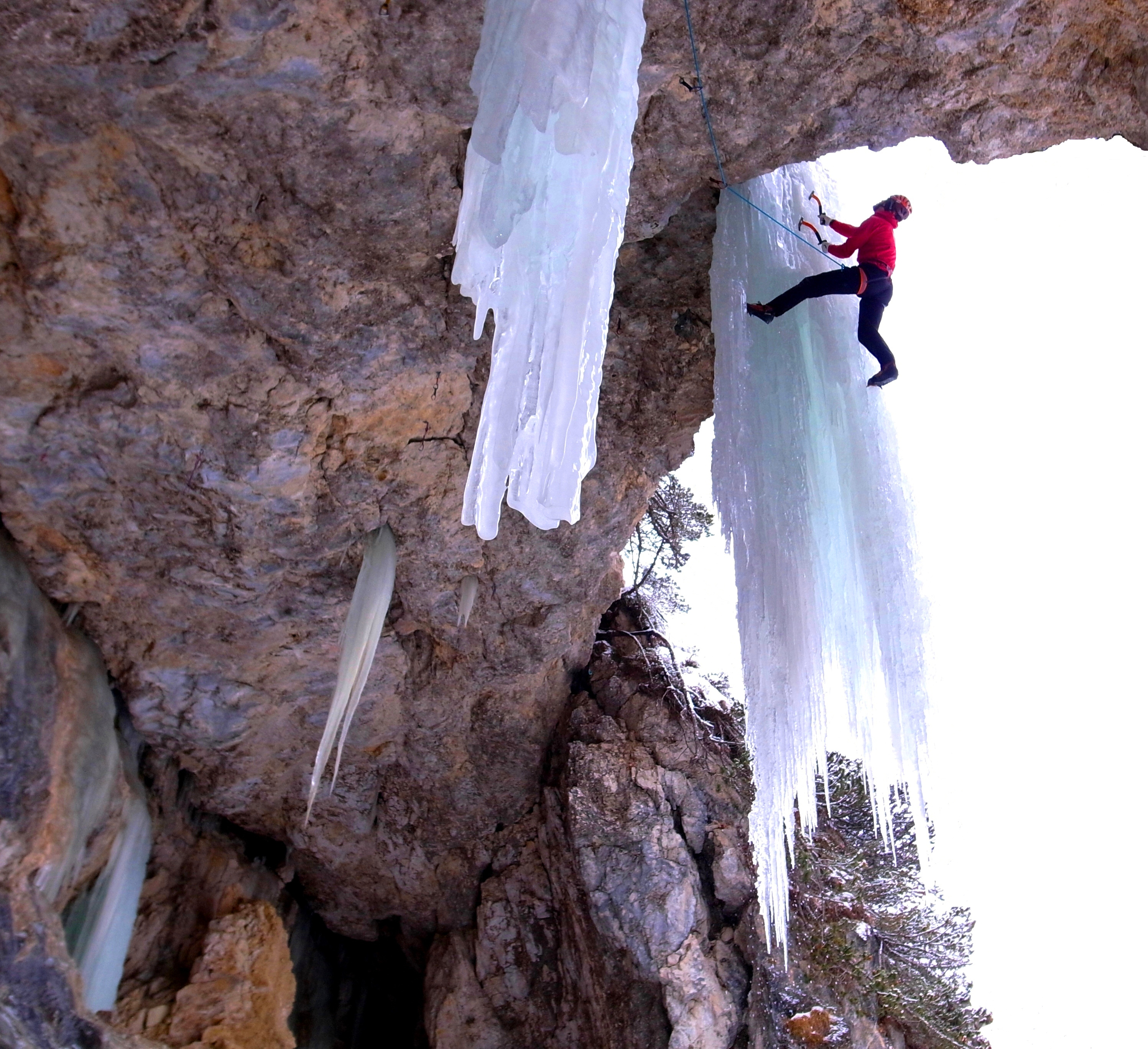
Ice climbing

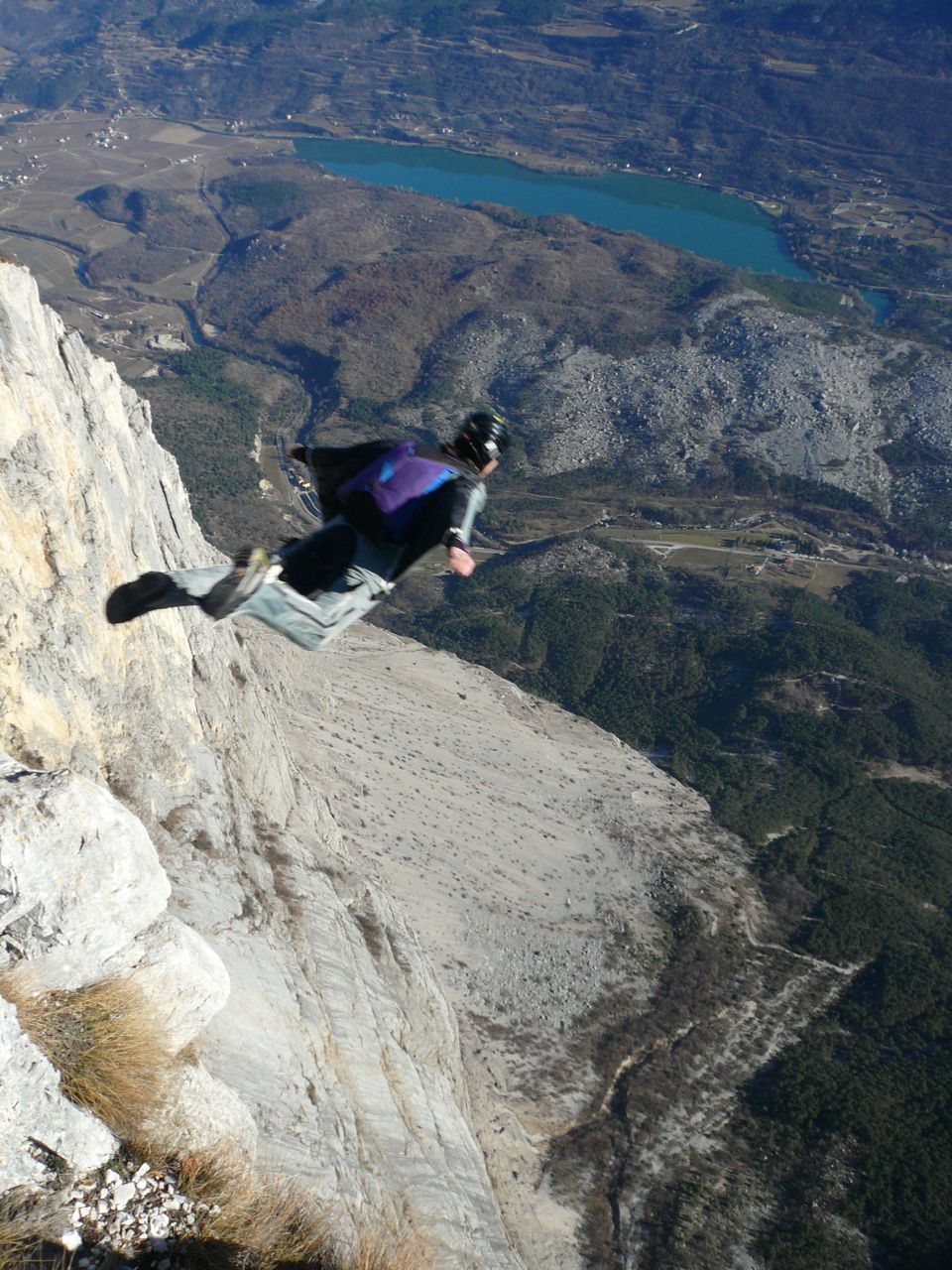
BASE jumping

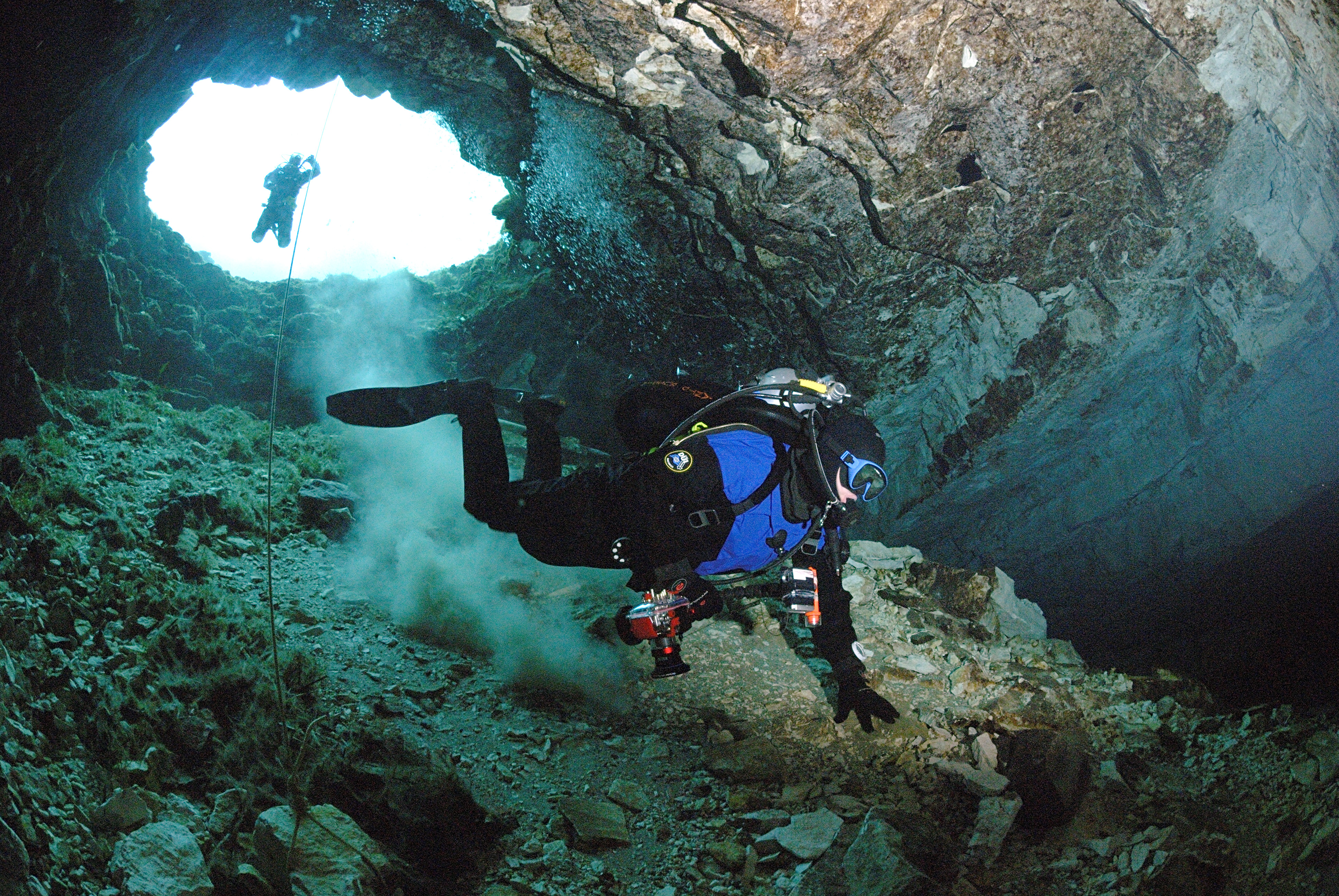
Cave diving

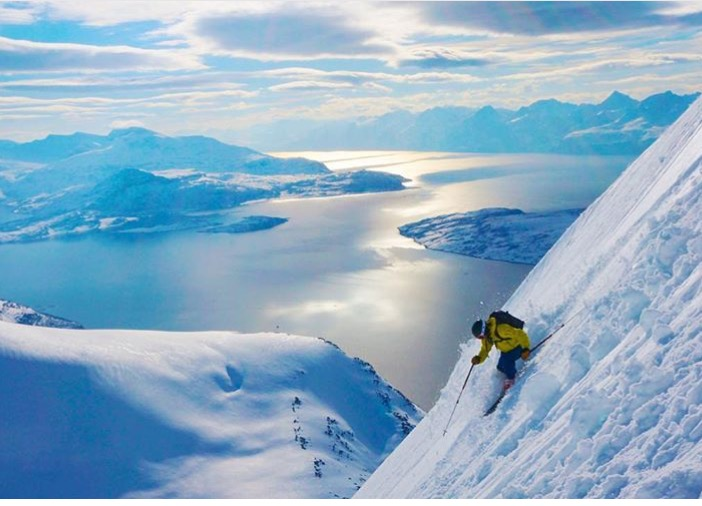
Ski mountaineering

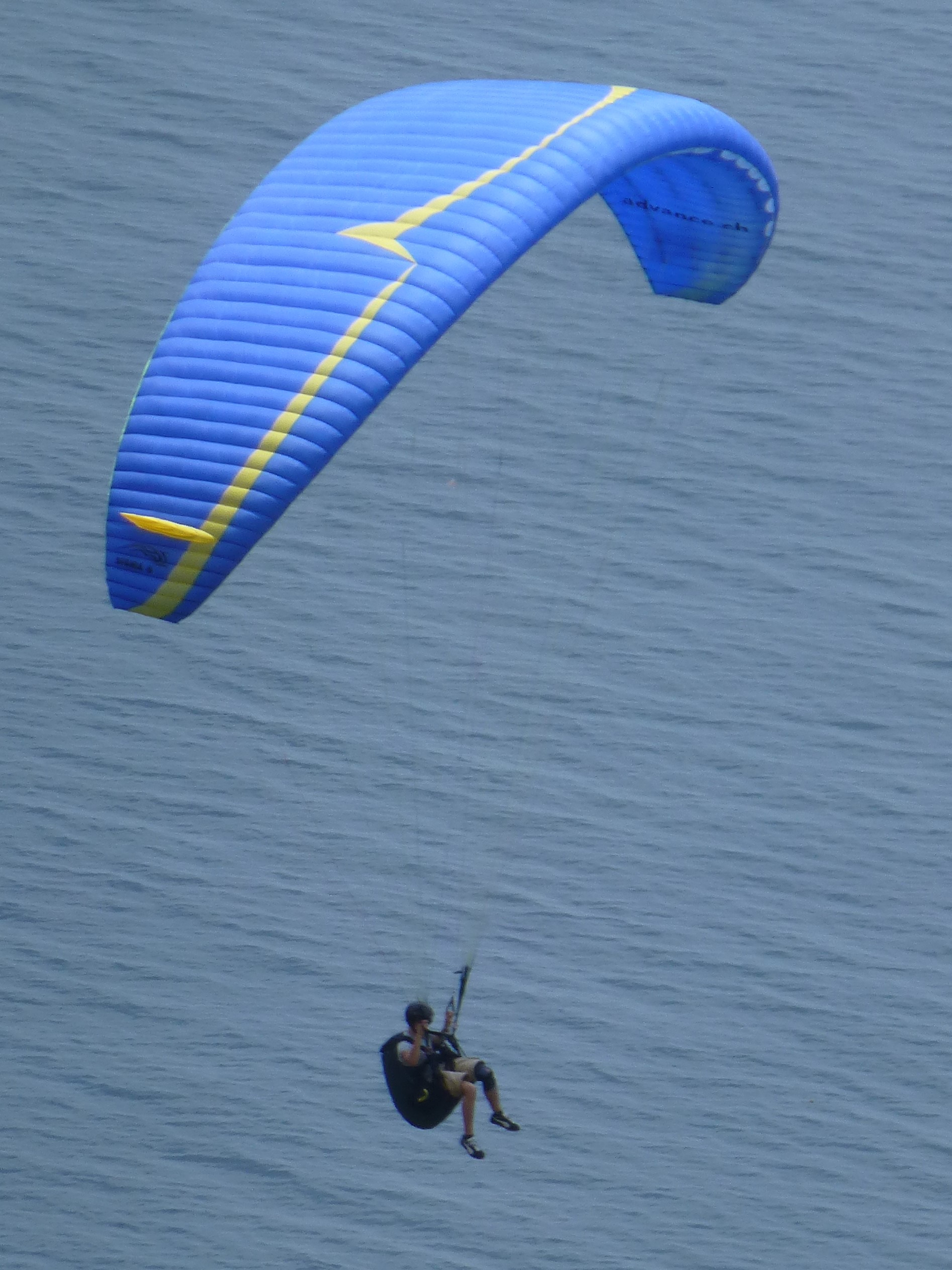
Paragliding

Extreme sports or action sports are activities perceived as involving a high degree of risk of injury or death. These activities often involve speed, height, a high level of physical exertion, and highly specialized gear. Extreme tourism overlaps with extreme sport.

== Definition ==
There is no precise definition of an 'extreme sport' and the origin of the term is unclear but it gained popularity in the 1990s when it was picked up by marketing companies to promote the X Games and when the Extreme Sports Channel and Extreme International launched. More recently, the commonly used definition from research is "a competitive (comparison or self-evaluative) activity within which the participant is subjected to natural or unusual physical and mental challenges such as speed, height, depth or natural forces and where fast and accurate cognitive perceptual processing may be required for a successful outcome" by Dr. Rhonda Cohen (2012).

While the use of the term "extreme sport" has spread everywhere to describe a multitude of different activities, exactly which sports are considered 'extreme' is debatable. There are, however, several characteristics common to most extreme sports. While they are not the exclusive domain of youth, extreme sports tend to have a younger-than-average target demographic. Extreme sports are also rarely sanctioned by schools for their physical education curriculum. Extreme sports tend to be more solitary than many of the popular traditional sports (rafting and paintballing are notable exceptions, as they are done in teams).

Activities categorized by media as extreme sports differ from traditional sports due to the higher number of inherently uncontrollable variables. These environmental variables are frequently weather and terrain-related, including wind, snow, water and mountains. Because these natural phenomena cannot be controlled, they inevitably affect the outcome of the given activity or event.

In a traditional sporting event, athletes compete against each other under controlled circumstances. While it is possible to create a controlled sporting event such as X Games, there are environmental variables that cannot be held constant for all athletes. Examples include changing snow conditions for snowboarders, rock and ice quality for climbers, and wave height and shape for surfers.

Whilst traditional sporting judgment criteria may be adopted when assessing performance (distance, time, score, etc.), extreme sports performers are often evaluated on more subjective and aesthetic criteria. This results in a tendency to reject unified judging methods, with different sports employing their own ideals and indeed having the ability to evolve their assessment standards with new trends or developments in the sports.

== History ==
The origin of the divergence of the term "extreme sports" from "sports" may date to the 1950s in the appearance of a phrase usually, but wrongly, attributed to Ernest Hemingway. The phrase is;

There are only three sports: bullfighting, motor racing, and mountaineering; all the rest are merely games.

The implication of the phrase was that the word "sport" defined an activity in which one might be killed, other activities being termed "games." The phrase may have been invented by either writer Barnaby Conrad or automotive author Ken Purdy.

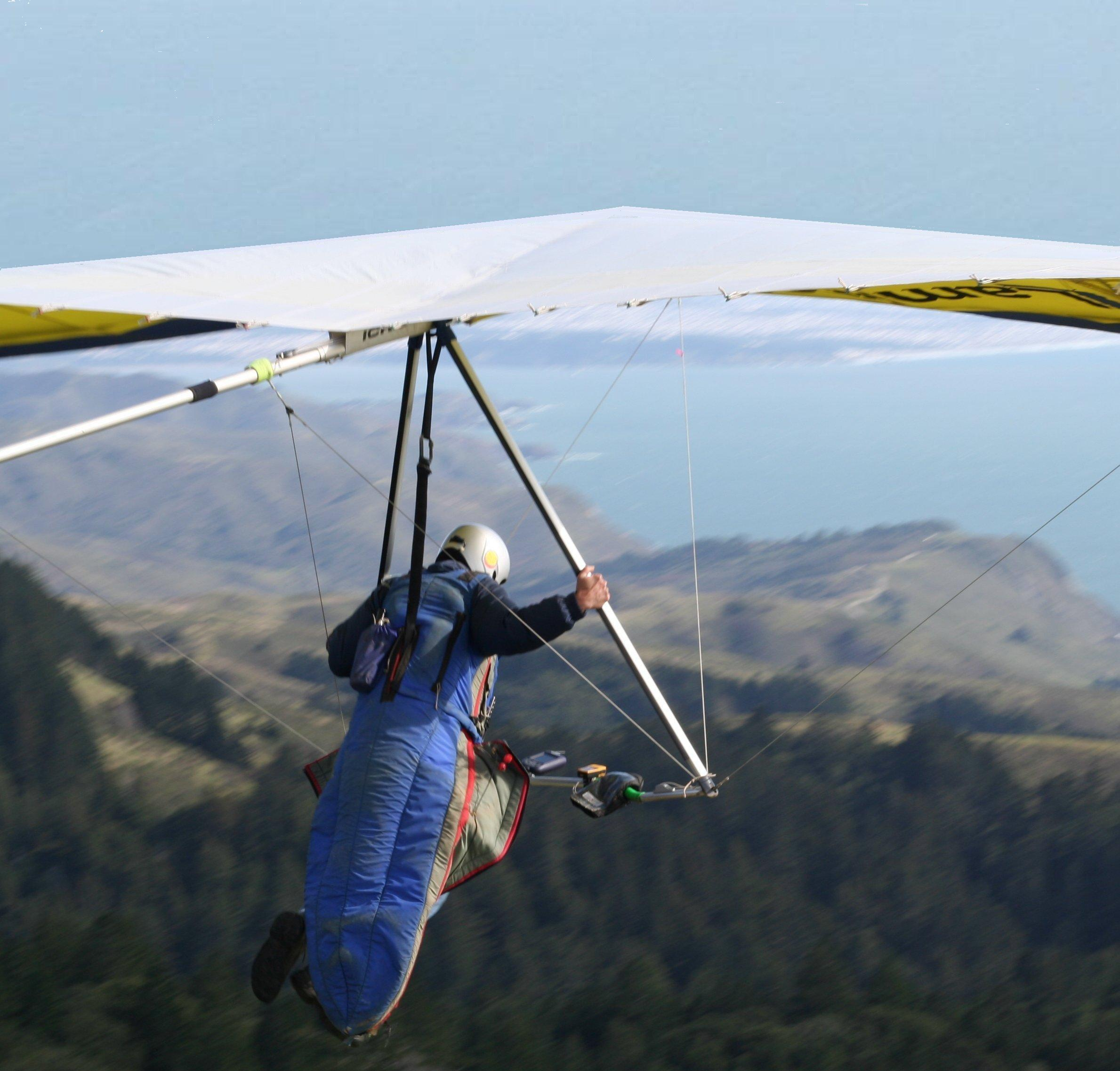
Hang glider launching from Mount Tamalpais

The Dangerous Sports Club of Oxford University, England was founded by David Kirke, Chris Baker, Ed Hulton and Alan Weston. They first came to wide public attention by inventing modern day bungee jumping, by making the first modern jumps on 1 April 1979, from the Clifton Suspension Bridge, Bristol, England. They followed the Clifton Bridge effort with a jump from the Golden Gate Bridge in San Francisco, California (including the first female bungee jump by Jane Wilmot), and with a televised leap from the Royal Gorge Suspension Bridge in Colorado, sponsored by and televised on the popular American television program That's Incredible! Bungee jumping was treated as a novelty for a few years, then became a craze for young people, and is now an established industry for thrill seekers.

The club also pioneered a surrealist form of skiing, holding three events at St. Moritz, Switzerland, in which competitors were required to devise a sculpture mounted on skis and ride it down a mountain. The event reached its limits when the Club arrived in St. Moritz with a London double-decker bus, wanting to send it down the ski slopes, and the Swiss resort managers refused.

Other Club activities included expedition hang gliding from active volcanoes; the launching of giant (20 m) plastic spheres with pilots suspended in the centre (zorbing); microlight flying; and BASE jumping (in the early days of this sport).

In recent decades the term extreme sport was further promoted after the Extreme Sports Channel, Extremeinternational.com launched and then the X Games, a multi-sport event was created and developed by ESPN. The first X Games (known as 1995 Extreme Games) were held in Newport, Providence, Mount Snow, and Vermont in the United States.

Certain extreme sports clearly trace back to other extreme sports, or combinations thereof. For example, windsurfing was conceived as a result of efforts to equip a surfboard with a sailing boat's propulsion system (mast and sail). Kitesurfing on the other hand was conceived by combining the propulsion system of kite buggying (a parafoil) with the bi-directional boards used for wakeboarding. Wakeboarding is in turn derived from snowboarding and waterskiing.

== Commercialisation ==
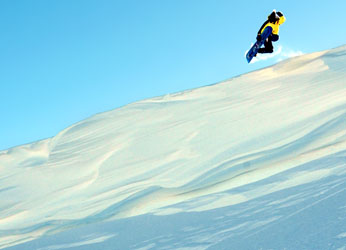
Snowboarder drops off a cornice.

Some contend that the distinction between an extreme sport and a conventional one has as much to do with marketing as with the level of danger involved or the adrenaline generated. For example, rugby union is both dangerous and adrenaline-inducing but is not considered an extreme sport due to its traditional image, and because it does not involve high speed or an intention to perform stunts (the aesthetic criteria mentioned above) and also it does not have changing environmental variables for the athletes.

== Motivation ==
A feature of such activities in the view of some is their alleged capacity to induce an adrenaline rush in participants. However, the medical view is that the rush or high associated with the activity is not due to adrenaline being released as a response to fear, but due to increased levels of dopamine, endorphins and serotonin because of the high level of physical exertion. Furthermore, recent studies suggest that the link to adrenaline and 'true' extreme sports is tentative. Brymer and Gray's study defined 'true' extreme sports as a leisure or recreation activity where the most likely outcome of a mismanaged accident or mistake was death. This definition was designed to separate the marketing hype from the activity.

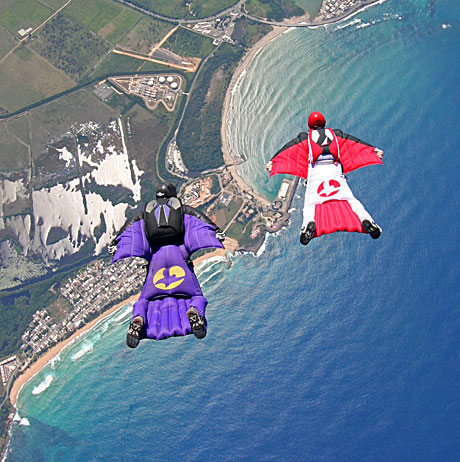
Wingsuit flying is a recent activity.

Eric Brymer also found that the potential of various extraordinary human experiences, many of which parallel those found in activities such as meditation, was an important part of the extreme sport experience. Those experiences put the participants outside their comfort zone and are often done in conjunction with adventure travel.

Some of the sports have existed for decades and their proponents span generations, some going on to become well known personalities. Rock climbing and ice climbing have spawned publicly recognizable names such as Edmund Hillary, Chris Bonington, Wolfgang Güllich and more recently Joe Simpson. Another example is surfing, invented centuries ago by the inhabitants of Polynesia, it will become national sport of Hawaii.

Disabled people participate in extreme sports. Nonprofit organizations such as Adaptive Action Sports seek to increase awareness of the participation in action sports by members of the disabled community, as well as increase access to the adaptive technologies that make participation possible and to competitions such as The X Games.

== Mortality, health, and thrill ==
Extreme sports may be perceived as extremely dangerous, conducive to fatalities, near-fatalities and other serious injuries. The perceived risk in an extreme sport has been considered a somewhat necessary part of its appeal, which is partially a result of pressure for athletes to make more money and provide maximum entertainment. Extreme sports is a sub-category of sports that are described as any kind of sport "of a character or kind farthest removed from the ordinary or average". These kinds of sports often carry out the potential risk of serious and permanent physical injury and even death. However, these sports also have the potential to produce drastic benefits on mental and physical health and provide opportunity for individuals to engage fully with life.

Extreme sporting activities may trigger the release of the hormone adrenaline, which can facilitate performance of stunts. It is believed that the implementation of extreme sports on mental health patients improves their perspective and recognition of aspects of life.

In outdoor adventure sports, participants get to experience the emotion of intense thrill, usually associated with the extreme sports. Even though some extreme sports present a higher level of risk, people still choose to embark in the experience of extreme sports for the sake of the adrenaline. According to Sigmund Freud, we have an instinctual 'death wish', which is a subconscious inbuilt desire to destroy ourselves, proving that in the seek for the thrill, danger is considered pleasurable.

== List of extreme and adventure sports ==
=== Adventure sports ===
- Bungee jumping
- Canyoning
- Caving
- Cave diving
- Extreme Pogo
- Extreme skiing
- Extreme ironing
- Alpine ski racing
- Flowriding
- Freediving
- Freeride biking
- Freerunning
- Freeskiing
- Freestyle scootering
- Freestyle skiing
- Hang gliding
- Ice canoeing
- Ice climbing
- Ice diving
- Ice yachting
- Inline skating
- Ironman Triathlon
- Extreme ironing
- Foiling
- Jetskiing
- Kitesurfing
- Land windsurfing
- Longboarding
- Motocross
- Motorcycle sport
- Mountainboarding
- Mountaineering
- Mountain biking
- Paragliding
- Parkour
- Rallying
- Rock climbing
- Scuba diving
- Skateboarding
- Ski jumping
- Skydiving
- Skysurfing
- Slacklining
- Snorkeling
- Snowboarding
- Snowmobiling (Snocross)
- Street luge
- Surfing
- Technical diving
- Volcano boarding
- Wakeboarding
- Water skiing
- Waveski
- Whitewater kayaking
- Windsurfing
- Winging

=== Extreme sports ===
- Air racing
- BASE jumping
- BMX
- Bobsleigh
- Bodyboarding
- Cliff jumping
- Canyoning
- Cave diving
- Extreme pogo
- Extreme skiing
- FreeBASEing
- Freeride biking
- Freerunning
- Freestyle scootering
- Hang gliding
- Ice climbing
- Ice diving
- Ice yachting
- Inline skating
- Ironman Triathlon
- Kitesurfing
- Land windsurfing
- Longboarding
- Motocross
- Motorcycle sport
- Mountainboarding
- Mountaineering
- Mountain biking
- Parkour
- Rallying
- Rock climbing
- Rope jumping
- Sandboarding
- Skateboarding
- Ski jumping
- Skysurfing
- Slacklining
- Snowboarding
- Snowmobiling (Snocross)
- Street luge
- Surfing
- Technical diving
- Ultramarathon
- Volcano boarding
- Wakeboarding
- Waveski
- Wingsuiting
- Whitewater kayaking

== See also ==
- Extreme Sports Channel
- Extreme tourism
- Adventure travel
- Extreme Games
