= Land windsurfing =

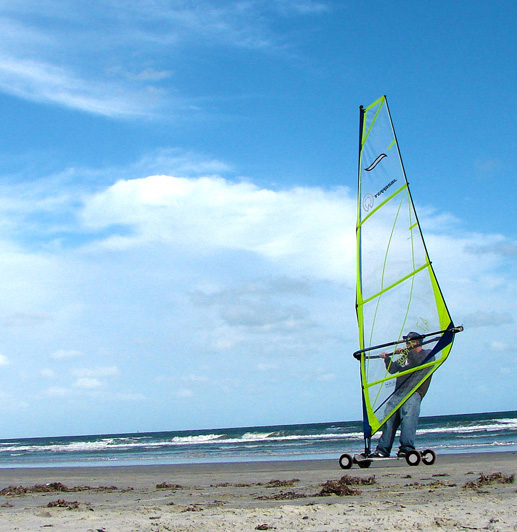
Terrasailing on the beach

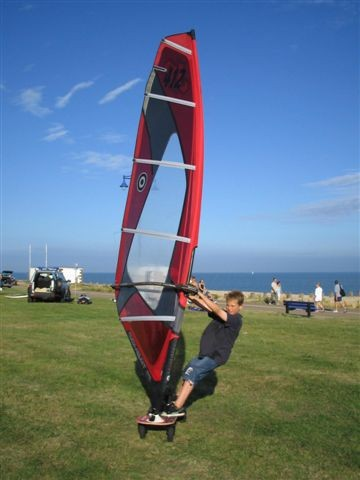
A turfdog land windsurfer.

Land windsurfing, also known as “Terrasailing”, “street sailing”, “land sailing” and “dirt windsurfing”, is a sport similar to traditional windsurfing that is performed on land rather than water. A four wheeled deck, similar to a mountain board or skateboard deck, is commonly used in conjunction with a mast and sail in order to project the board across land.

== Equipment ==
Several companies offer specially designed land boards which allow for easy coupling between the board and mast base of the sail. These boards are drilled with a special hole at the front of the deck that permits the application of the mast base to the board. Land boards equipped with all-terrain tires can be used on multiple ground types such as sand, grass, asphalt, and dirt. Most land boards require a minimum of a 5 mph wind speed in order to be propelled. Wind speed requirements may vary depending on what ground type is being traversed.

== Competitions ==
Land windsurfing is an all-season sport and is often used by traditional windsurfers for training during winter months when waters become frigid. Advanced land windsurfing riders are able to perform technical freestyle tricks similarly seen in other extreme sports such as windsurfing, skateboarding and snowboarding. Land windsurfing marathons have been undertaken across the Sahara in 1979 by Arnaud de Rosnay and Nullarbor Plain in 1985 by Gavin Le Sueur.

== See also ==
- Land sailing
