= Pacaya =

Mountain and national park in Guatemala

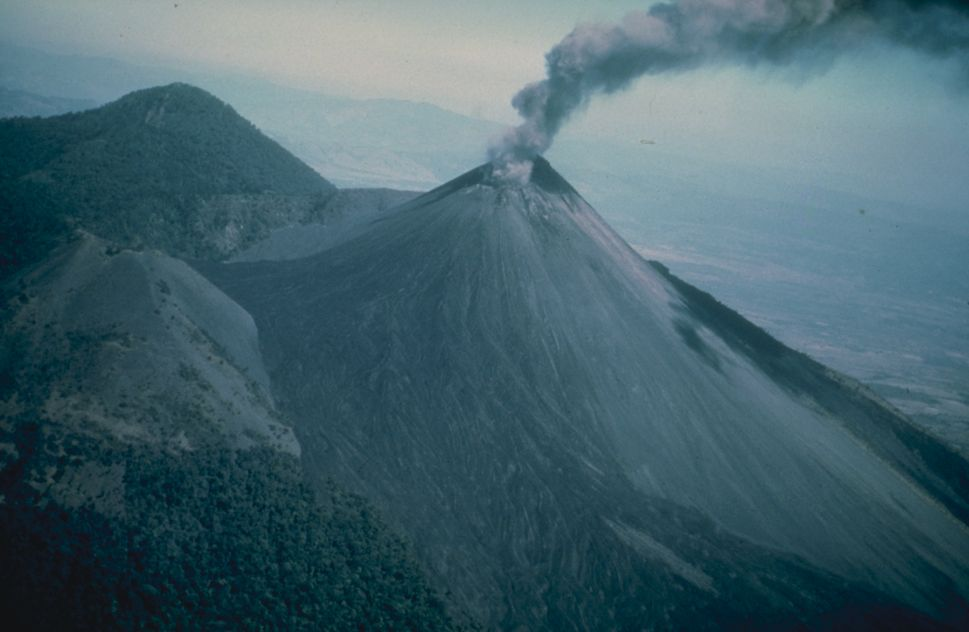
- An eruption of Pacaya in 1976

Highest point
- Elevation: 2,552 m (8,373 ft)
- Prominence: 1,077 m (3,533 ft)
- Listing: List of volcanoes in Guatemala
- Coordinates: 14°22′51″N 90°36′04″W

Geography
- Location within Guatemala
- Location: San Vicente Pacaya, Escuintla, Guatemala

Geology
- Rock age: 0-23,000
- Mountain type: Complex volcano
- Volcanic arc: Central America Volcanic Arc
- Last eruption: February 14, 2021 - ongoing

Pacaya is an active complex volcano in Guatemala, which first erupted approximately 23,000 years ago and has erupted at least 23 times since the Spanish conquest of Guatemala. It rises to an elevation of 2,552 metres (8,373 ft). After being dormant for over 70 years, it began erupting vigorously in 1961 and has been erupting frequently since then. Much of its activity is Strombolian, but occasionally Plinian eruptions also occur, sometimes showering the area of the nearby Departments with ash.

Pacaya is a popular tourist destination. It is the home of the popular Guatemala Impact Marathon which pioneered the use of a running route across the lava field created by the 2010 eruption and supports the local communities through events to complete the challenge. It lies 30 kilometers (19 miles) southwest of Guatemala City and close to Antigua. The volcano sits inside the Escuintla Department. Volcano Boarding is also practiced on the craters of Pacaya.

Villagers near Pacaya ignored an evacuation request as the volcano threw ash into the air in March 2021.

== Geological history ==
The Pacaya volcano is a part of the Central American Volcanic Arc, a chain of volcanoes stretching from the northwest to the southeast along the Pacific coast of Central America, formed by the tectonic subduction of the Cocos Tectonic Plate beneath the Caribbean Plate. Pacaya lies on the southern edge of a sizable volcanic caldera formed in the Pleistocene age which contains Lago de Amatitlán. This caldera has been the source of at least nine very large explosions over the past 300,000 years, erupting a total of about 70 cubic kilometres (17 mi^{3}) of magma.

After the last caldera-forming eruption 23,000 years ago, several smaller vents within and around the caldera have seen eruptive activity. Pacaya is the largest post-caldera volcano, and has been one of Central America's most active volcanoes over the last 500 years. It has erupted at least 23 times since the Spanish conquest, producing basalt and basaltic andesite.

About 1,100 years ago the volcano's edifice collapsed, causing a huge landslide. Deposits from the landslide travelled about 25 kilometres (16 mi) from the volcano down to the Pacific coastal plain. The landslide left a large crater, within which the current active cone has grown. The presence of a magma chamber at shallow depths beneath Pacaya means that distortion of the cone leading to instability and future landslides remains a hazard to the surrounding areas.

== Recent eruptions ==
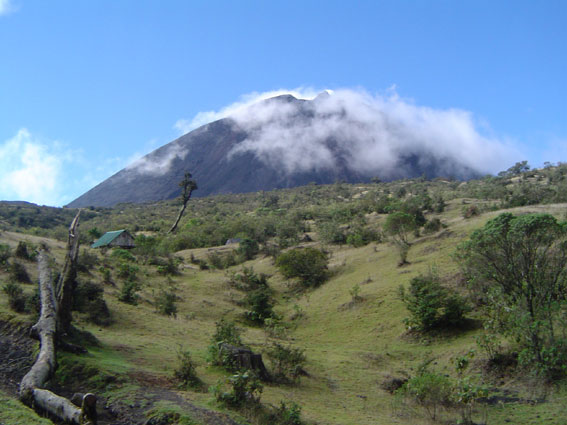
Pacaya Volcano

With its almost continuous activity, the volcano has been a popular location for tourism, and is easily accessible from Guatemala City and from Antigua. Pacaya and the surrounding area now lie within the Pacaya National Park, which was created to supervise and protect tourism in this region. The Pacaya Park generates its income from tour groups who are charged a fee of about 100 Quetzales to enter the park.

In 1998, several explosive eruptions emitted lava, debris and ash columns with a height of 1,500 m (4,900 ft) to 5,000 m (16,000 ft). The ash fall affected nearby cities including Guatemala city and La Aurora International Airport.

During 2006, a slight increase in Pacaya's volcanic activity brought about the creation of several lava rivers that slowly flowed down its slope. Word about these phenomena spread, and local tourism increased significantly.

=== May 2010 eruption ===
On May 27, 2010, the Pacaya volcano erupted, followed by several tremors. At approximately 20:00 hours there was a strong eruption ejecting debris and ash columns up to 1,500 metres (4,900 ft). Ash rained down in many Guatemalan cities to the northwest of the volcano, including Guatemala City. The volcanic ash fall pelted Guatemala City, and the international airport, La Aurora. The National Coordinator for Disaster Reduction (CONRED) declared a red alert for the communities near the volcano and recommended the evacuation of some of them. Noti7 reporter Anibal Archila, one of the first to cover the event, was reportedly killed by volcanic debris.

President Álvaro Colom declared a state of calamity in the region adjacent to the volcano, and the Ministry of Education closed the schools in the departments of Guatemala, Escuintla, and Sacatepequez. Heavy rainfall from Tropical Storm Agatha worsened the emergency situation, causing lahars, landslides and widespread flooding across the country. However, people working in coffee fields considered the rain brought by the storm to be helpful, removing ash from their trees.

=== 2026 unrest ===
Starting in early 2026, Pacaya began showing increased unrest. On March 9, 2026, the Instituto Nacional de Sismologia Vulcanlogia Meteorologia e Hidrologia reported that unrest has continued. Gas and vapor plumes were observed rising from inside the crater.

== Image gallery ==
Pacaya

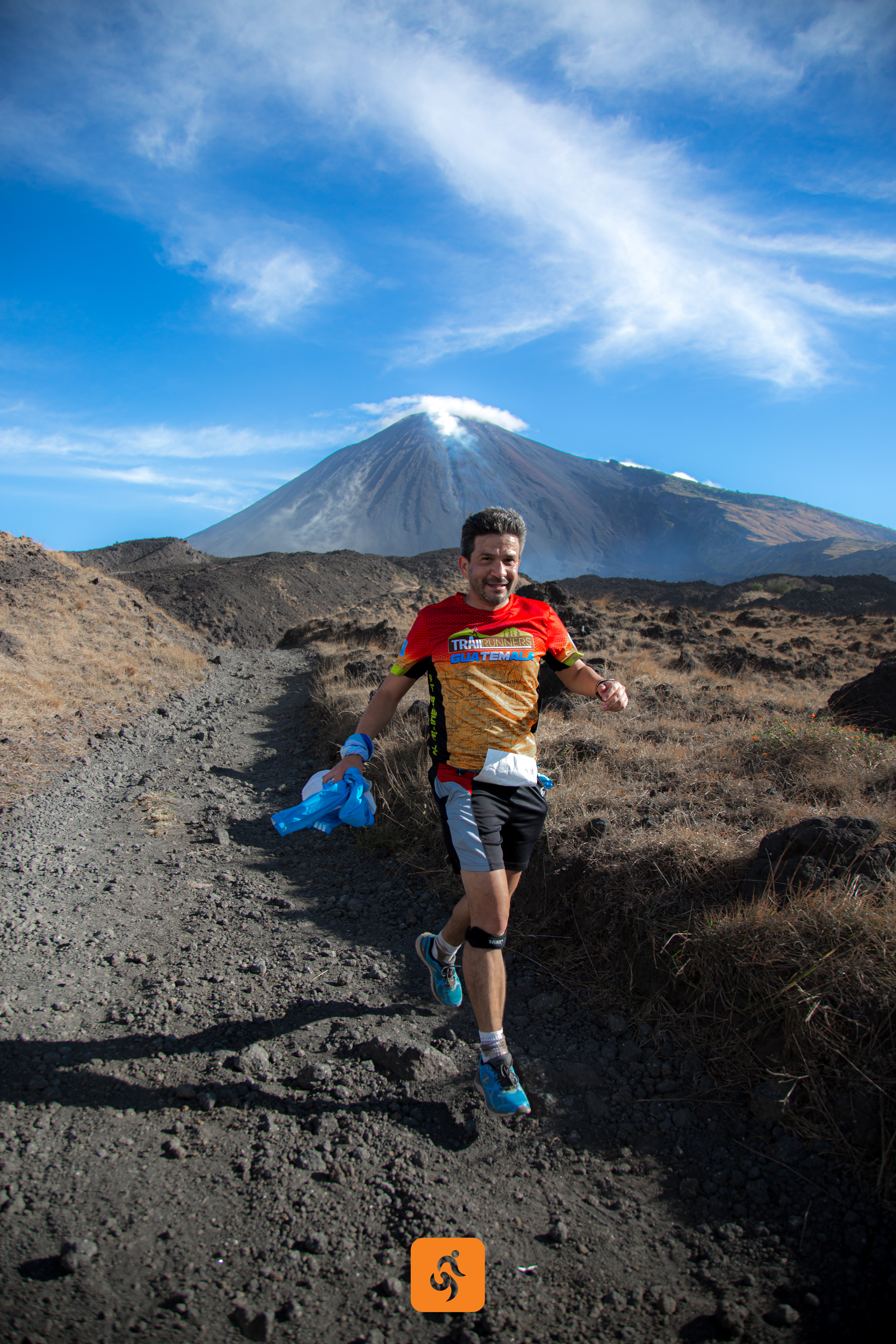
Runners at the Impact Marathon race on Pacaya

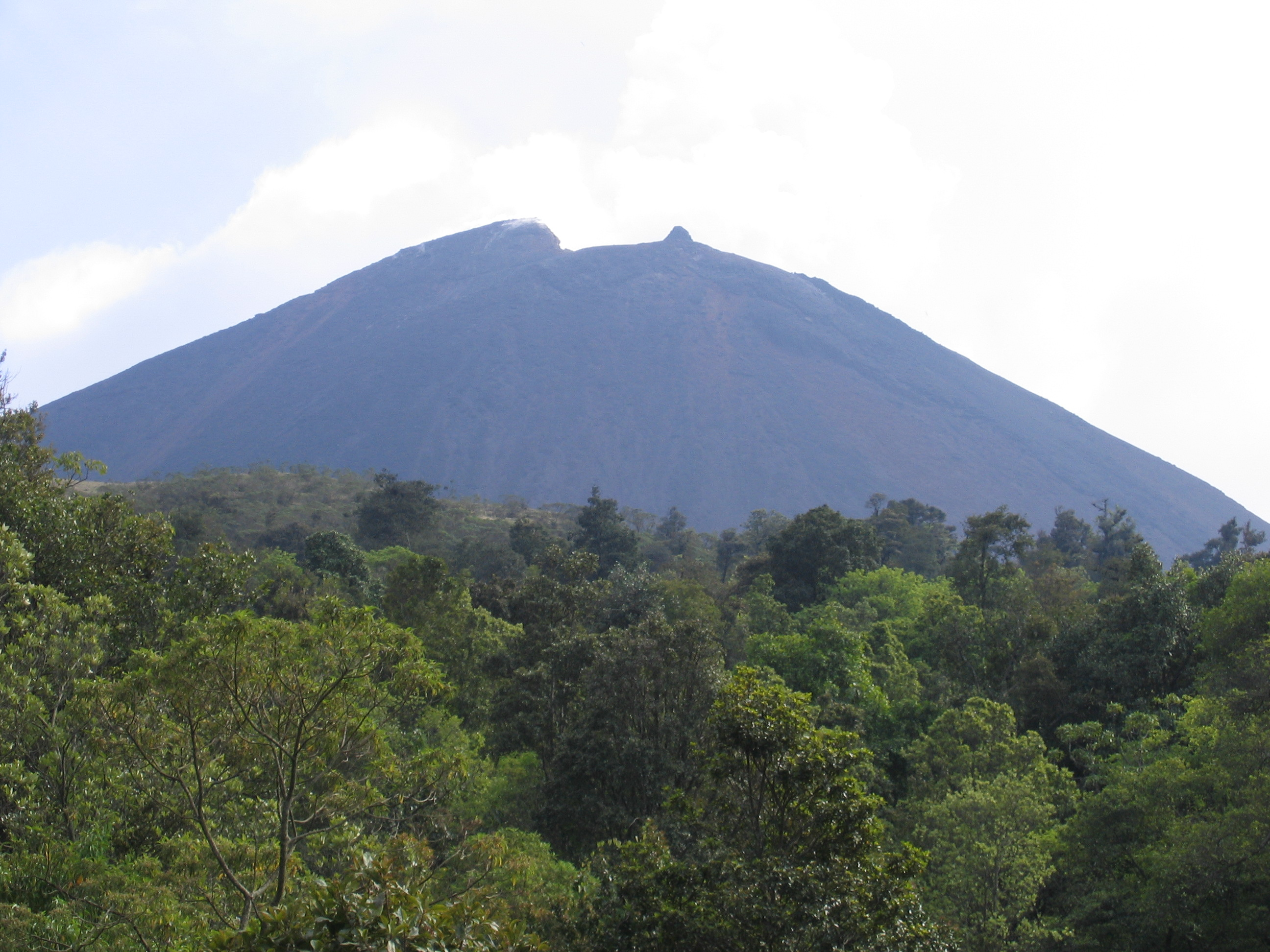
Volcán Pacaya (2005).

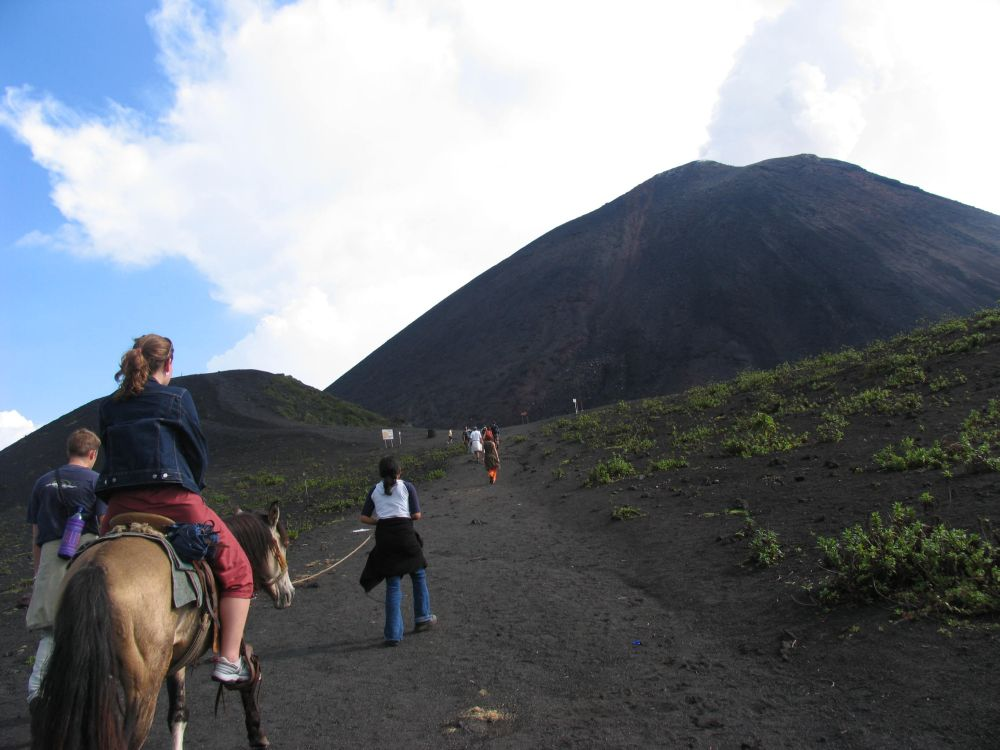
Tourists climbing Pacaya (2004).

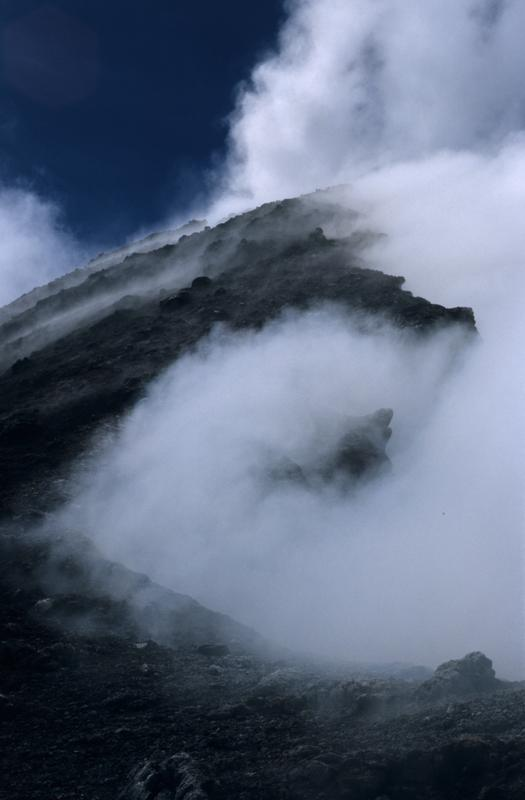
Noxious gas cloud (2002).

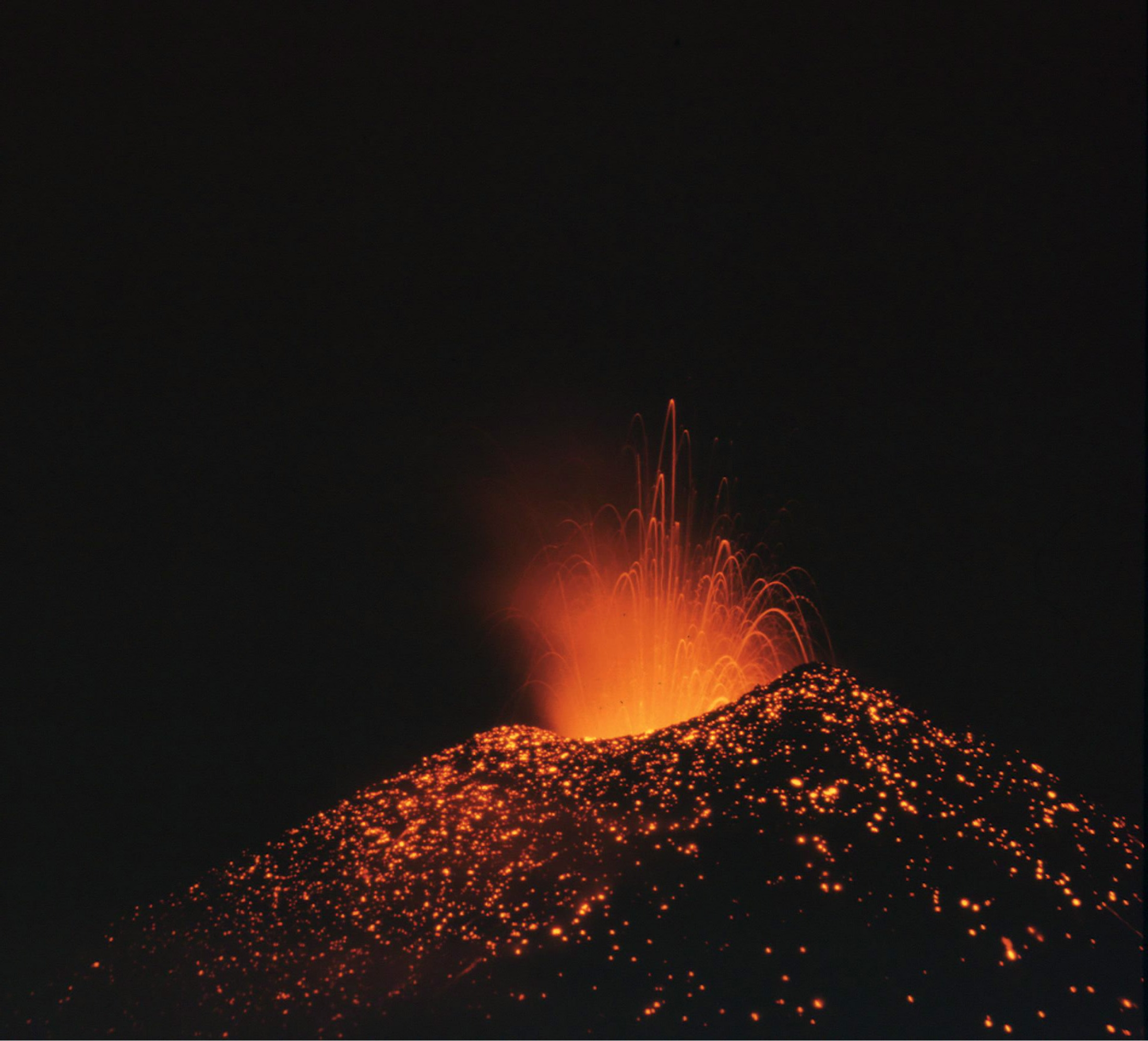
Pacaya after a strombolian eruption (1992).

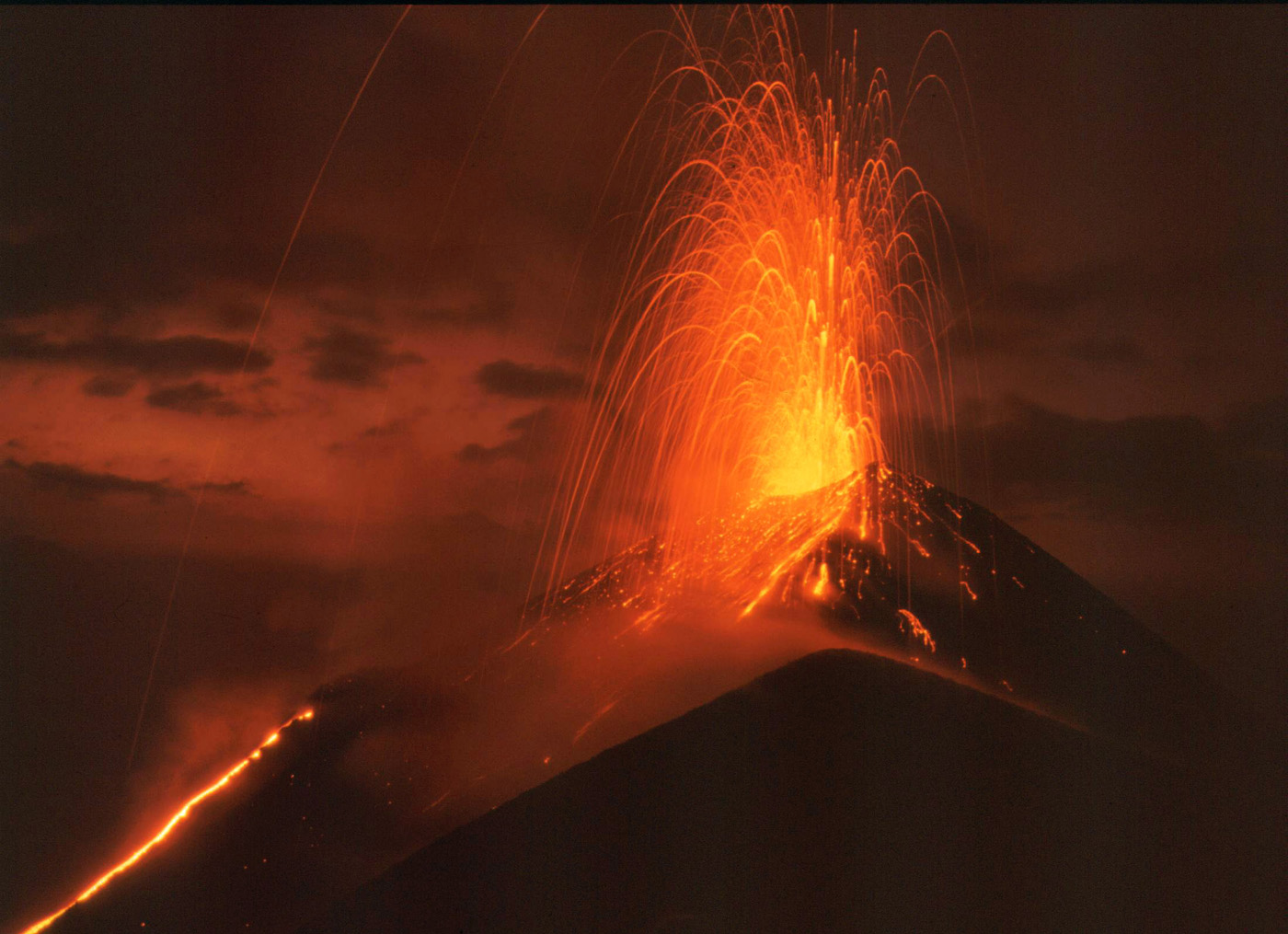
Strombolian eruption of Pacaya (1992).

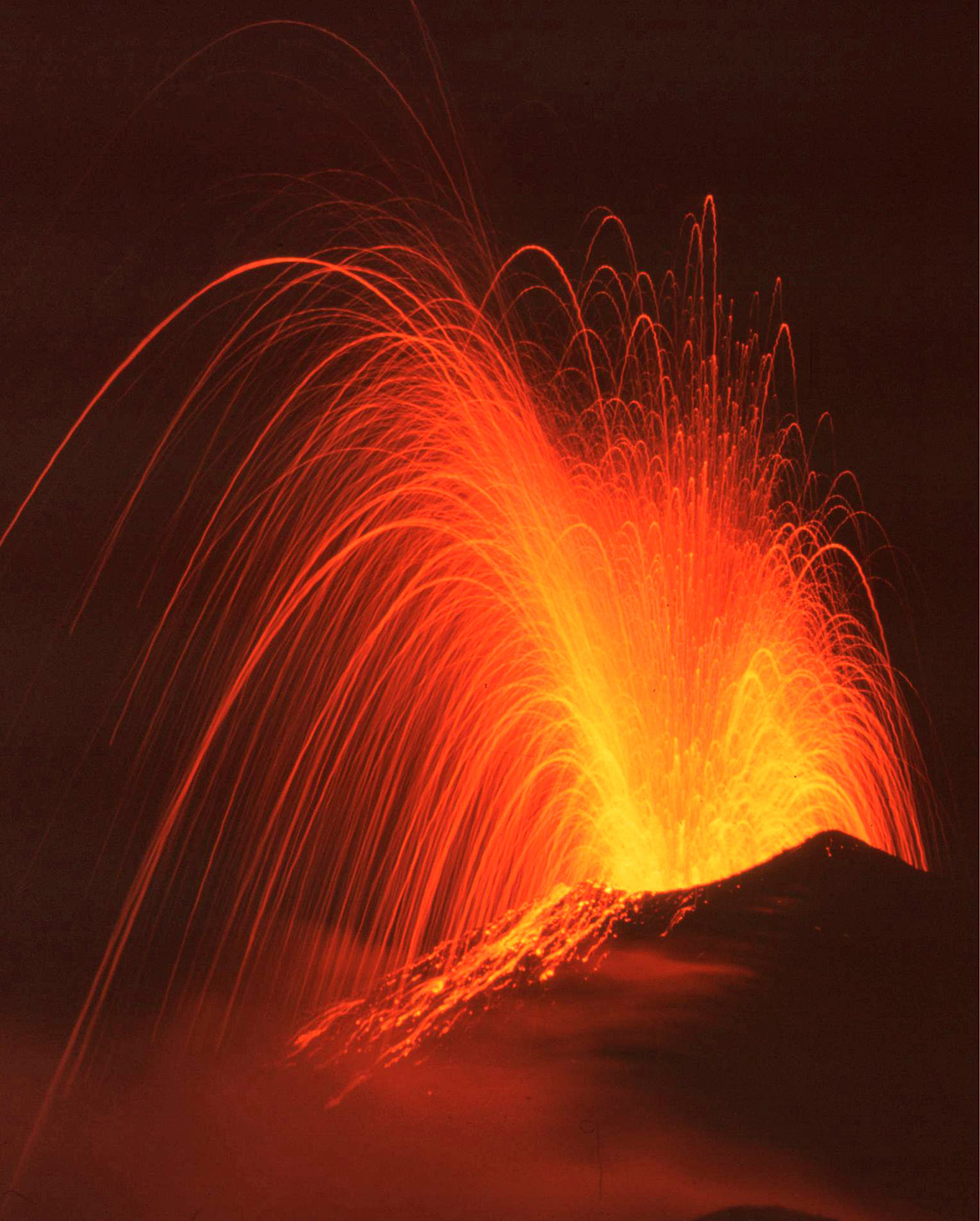
Strombolian eruption of Pacaya (1992).

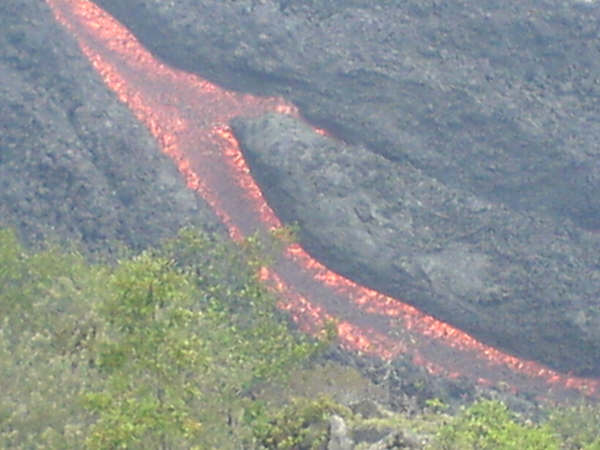
Lava flow (2006).

== See also ==
- Central America Volcanic Arc
- Pizza Pacaya
