= Street luge =

Extreme gravity-powered activity

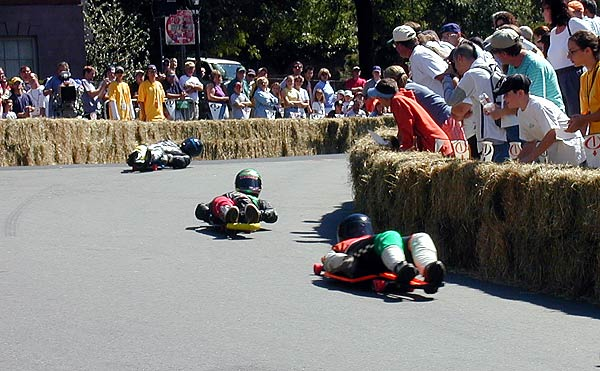
2001 Gravity Games. Providence, RI

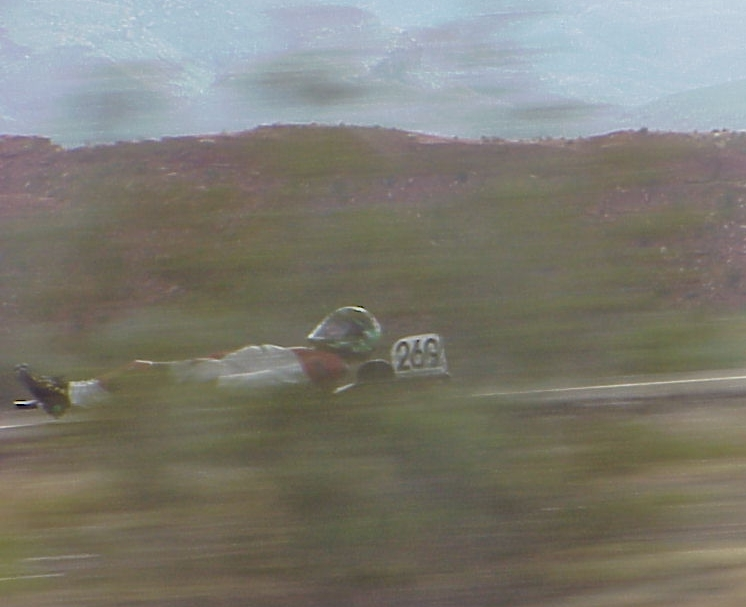
Recreation run down Winchester, Utah (Snow Canyon in background)

Street luge is an extreme gravity-powered activity that involves riding a street luge board (sometimes referred to as a sled) down a paved road or course. Street luge is also known as land luge or road luge. Like skateboarding, street luge is often done for sport and for recreation.

Other than the supine riding position and very high speeds (70–102 mph / 112–164 km/h), street luge has little relation to its winter namesake (luge).

== History ==
Street luge was born in Southern California as downhill skateboarders found they could reach faster speeds by lying down on their skateboards. This early form of the sport is now referred to as "laydown skateboarding".

In 1975, the first professional race was held at Signal Hill, California, and hosted by the U.S. Skateboard Association. The race winner was based on top speed. The boards used in this race varied from basic skateboards to complex skate cars in which the rider was completely enclosed by plastic or fiberglass. The sport was not commonly referred to as street luge at this time but the term luge was used to describe some participants' riding position. Most contestants were standing up; however, an opening in the rules enabled riders to choose their own board position, including supine. By 1978, repeated injuries to both riders and spectators halted the races at Signal Hill.

Roger Hickey and Don Baumea from the Signal Hill races kept the sport alive by continuing to hold races in Southern California. Around the early 1990s, both underground and professional races continued to be held in Southern California by such organizations as the Underground Racers Association (URA), Federation of International Gravity Racing (FIGR) and Road Racers Association for International Luge (RAIL). Race organizers in the 1980s and 1990s started implementing many more equipment, safety and race regulations.

Meanwhile, in the early 1990s, some Austrian skateboarders started sitting down on their skateboards on the way back from teaching skiing in the Alps. This activity lead to a classic style street luge race in the Kaunertal Valley, in western Austria, called Hot Heels. At the outset, the founders started lying down on wooden boards closer to large skateboards than the usual street luge, and with smaller wheels: this came to be known as classic luge, or buttboard. The race, which ran until 2003, came to function as a de facto world championships, including all the downhill disciplines such as street luge, stand up downhill skateboard, classic luge, gravity biking and inline skating. There is now a healthy street luge riding and racing presence in many European countries (see below).

In the mid 1990s, ESPN’s X Games showcased street luge to the world and the sport was originally sanctioned by RAIL, then by the International Gravity Sports Association (IGSA). NBC followed ESPN’s lead and created the Gravity Games in which the sport was sanctioned by Extreme Downhill International (EDI). Smaller events were also held in Canada, South Africa, Australia, Switzerland, Germany, Sweden and the U.K. Qualification criteria for these events varied and were controlled by each of the sanctioning bodies.

After a media splurge through the late 1990s and early 2000s, extreme sports like street luge have taken a lower profile. The X Games has become more stadium-based for commercial reasons. Others, such as the Gravity Games, Hot Heels and the Australian Xtreme Games, have disappeared.

While no longer a sport in either the X Games or Gravity Games, street luge is a growing sport in some countries with competitions around the globe. There are approximately 1200 active street luge riders in the world.

== World record for gravity-powered speed ==
On September 10, 2016, American Mike McIntyre broke the world record by reaching 164.12 km/h (101.98 mph) at l'Ultime Descente on his third of three runs, with all three runs breaking the 100 mph barrier. McIntyre crashed heavily in the treacherous nadir of the descent during his shutdown process and spent the night in a Quebec City hospital.

== Champions ==
World Skate Games champions
Year	Street luge
2026	Abdil Mahdzan – MYS
2022	Ryan Farmer – USA
2019	Alexandre Cerri Machado – Brazil

IDF World Series champions
Year	Street luge	Classic luge
2019	Abdil Mahdzan – Malaysia	
2018	Kolby Parks – Canada	
2017	Ryan Farmer – USA	
2016	Abdil Mahdzan – Malaysia	
2015	Mikel Echegaray Diez – Spain	Mikel Echegaray Diez – Spain
2014	David Dean – United States	Fabian Gutiérrez Roa – Mexico
2013	Abdil Mahdzan – Malaysia	Konstantin Weigl – Austria

IGSA World Series champions
Year	Street luge	Classic luge
2013	Frank Williams – United States	Frank Williams – United States
2012	Abdil Mahdzan – Malaysia	Frank Williams – United States
2011	Yvon Labarthe – Switzerland	Michael Serek – Austria
2010	Peter Eliot – Great Britain	Michael Serek – Austria
2009	Yvon Labarthe – Switzerland	Michael Serek – Austria
2008	Leander Lacey – Africa	Michael Serek – Austria
2007	Sebastian Tournissac – France	Michael Serek – Austria
2006	Beni Weber – Switzerland	Beni Weber – Switzerland
2005	David Dean – United States	David Dean – United States
2004	Rian James – United States	Rian James – United States
2003	Richard Knaggs – South Africa	Jeremy Gilder – Great Britain
2002	Pete Eliot – Great Britain	Jeremy Gilder – Great Britain
2001	Dave Rogers – United States	Dave Rogers – United States

== Equipment, safety and racing ==
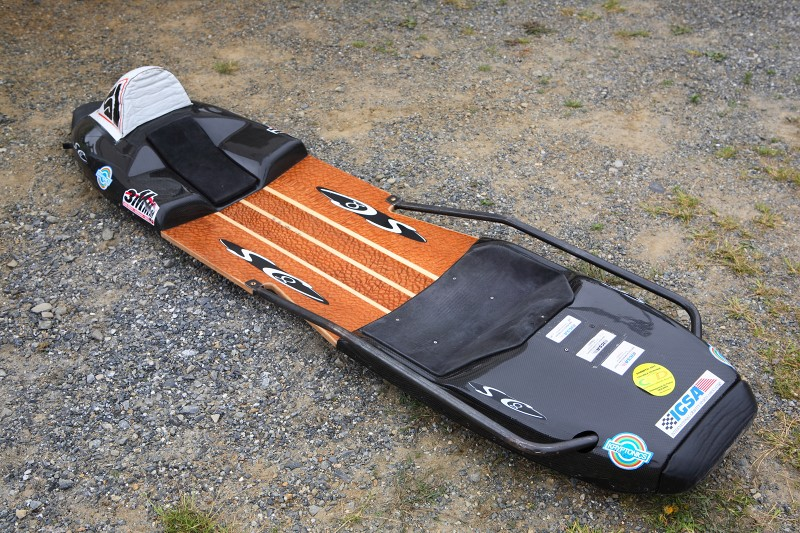
Street luge board

Street lugers ride boards in the supine position. The design of these boards is based on the rules set forth from different governing bodies. Consistent design elements include:

1. The use of lean-activated steering skateboard-style trucks
2. The prohibited use of mechanical brakes
3. Front and rear padding
4. Length, width and weight restrictions – details depend on sanctioning body
5. The prohibited use of parts that enclose the rider’s body or hinder braking

Current street luge boards are made from many materials including steel, aluminum, wood, and carbon fibre. The majority of the street luge boards in the world are custom made although commercial models are now available. Actual board designs can vary as the construction rules are very open and allow for numerous design considerations.

An offshoot of street luge is classic luge. With more regulations and limits to construction and equipment it was designed to be a simpler, low cost class as compared to street luge. Classic Luge boards are typically made from wood, are limited to maximum dimensions of 49 inches by 12 inches (124 cm by 30 cm) and may only have four wheels. Maximum wheels diameter may also be restricted depending on the sanctioning body and race organizer.

Riders participating in sanctioned racing events are required to wear safety equipment including:

1. Hard-shell helmet with chin strap and face shield or goggles
2. Leather or Kevlar racing suit
3. Leather or Kevlar gloves
4. Sturdy shoes

Race courses are usually held on mountain roads but have been held on city streets as well. Courses can range in length from 0.5 to 3 miles (1 to 5 km) and vary in layout (number and severity of turns). Racing can take the following formats:

1. Single elimination with 2, 4, or 6 racers at a time
2. Double elimination with 2, 4, or 6 racers at a time
3. Timed trials
4. No elimination points system (points for each finishing position in several heats)
5. Mass runs, with up to 20 racers at a time (positions are decided by the order they cross the finish line)

== Governing bodies ==
There are currently two worldwide governing bodies for street luge, the International Gravity Sports Association (IGSA) and the International Downhill Federation (IDF).

The ruling body for street luge during the 1997–2001 X Games was the IGSA.
