= Volcano boarding =

Practice of sliding down the slopes of a volcanic mountain

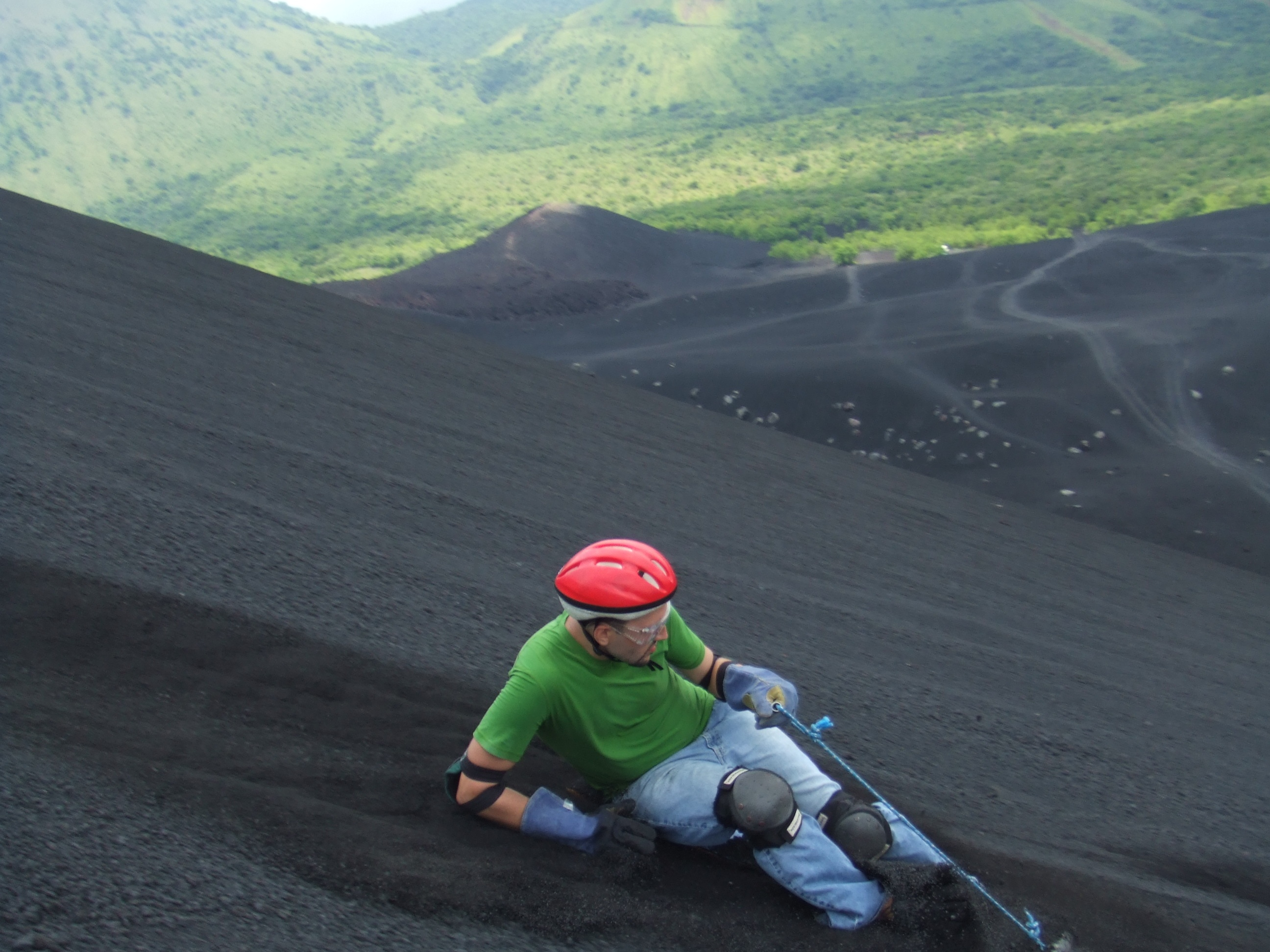
A boarder sliding down Cerro Negro, Nicaragua

Volcano boarding or volcano surfing is a sport performed on the slopes of a volcano. One of the most popular places for the activity is the Cerro Negro near Leon in western Nicaragua. Riders hike up the volcano and slide down, sitting or standing, on a thin plywood or metal board. The sport is also practiced on Mount Yasur on Tanna, Vanuatu; Mount Bromo in Indonesia; and very few other locations.

Volcano boarding can be an extreme sport. Potential dangers include falling and getting cut by the rough volcanic ash, breathing poisonous gases, contracting histoplasmosis (otherwise known as "caver's disease"), or being hit by flying molten lava. Protective gear, including jumpsuits and goggles, is often used. Cerro Negro is an active volcano, although the last eruption was in 1999. Mount Yasur is far more active and more dangerous, with volcanic eruptions occurring every day.

The activity can reach high speeds, with rides typically lasting only a few minutes and reaching up to 43 mph (69 km/h). The current record for volcano boarding speed is 68 mph (109 km/h).

Sandboarding, a similar activity performed on sand dunes, was established in the 1970s and 1980s: Derek Bredenkamp and others boarded Swakopmund in Namibia around 1974; Jack Smith and Gary Fluitt popularized it in California in the early 1980s.

National Geographic Channel adventurer and journalist Zoltan Istvan credits himself with inventing the volcano boarding sport on Mount Yasur on the island of Tanna in Vanuatu in 2002, though Istvan first visited the active volcano in 1995. He filmed his adventure, and it later aired on the National Geographic Channel in a five-minute news segment. Istvan differentiates volcano boarding into two forms: 1) boarding down an active volcano where immediate dangers come from flying molten lava and lethal volcanic gases, and 2) boarding down an inactive volcano where no immediate danger is present (similar to sandboarding). Other locations popular for their volcano boarding include Mount Fuji in Japan, Mount Etna in Italy, and Pacaya Volcano in Guatemala.

In Hawaii, an ancient sport known as he'e holua or lava sledding is a similar activity.

It was largely popularized as a commercial extreme sport by Australian Daryn Webb (The Commercializer) who also owned and founded a hostel (Bigfoot Hostel) in 2004 or 2005, it was at this hostel that he developed the sport, using it as a base for the world's first commercial volcano boarding tours. Daryn eventually sold the hostel in 2008.

== Equipment and safety gear ==
For volcano boarding, participants typically use a specialized board, similar to a snowboard but with an extra layer of laminated material at the bottom to reduce friction. Safety gear includes a jumpsuit, dust-proof goggles, gloves and spike shoes

.

== See also ==
- Sandboarding
- Snowboarding
- Extreme sports
- X Games
