= Pizza Pacaya =

Pizza restaurant in San Vicente Pacaya, Guatemala

Pizza Pacaya is a pizza restaurant in San Vicente Pacaya, Guatemala. The restaurant is known for using Pacaya, an active volcano, to cook its pizza.

== History ==
Pizza Pacaya was founded by Mario David García, who said that he was inspired to use the volcano to cook pizzas after seeing tour guides roast marshmallows on the volcano. García first started making pizzas on Pacaya in 2013, and said that it took him five years to perfect the art of cooking pizza with a volcano. Baking pizza in volcanic stone, García claims, creates a unique flavor, and takes ten minutes to complete.

García said that there have been two separate instances where the volcano erupted while he was serving a pizza; no one was hurt in either instance.

Customers at Pizza Pacaya must make a reservation in advance, and have to be accompanied by tour guides on the hike up Pacaya. García said that he typically sees between 200 and 400 customers in a week.
