= Ice canoeing =

Boat race combining rowing and dragging over ice

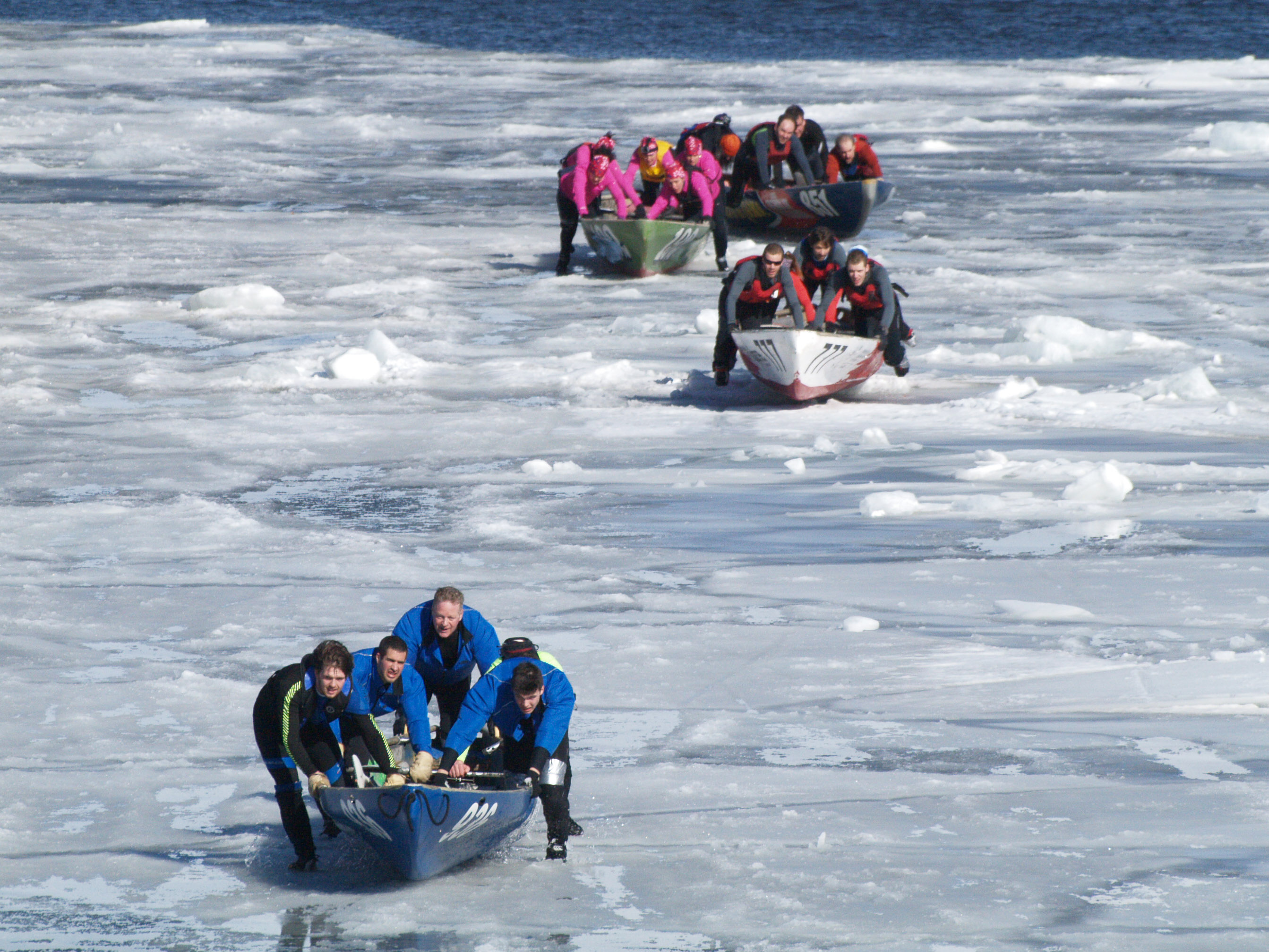
Défi canot à glace Bota Bota 2014

Originally a means of winter transport between the islands and shores of the Saint Lawrence River, ice canoeing is now a sport. Crews of five athletes alternately push their canoe across the ice on the frozen parts of the river, and paddle in a river with currents of four knots, tides of over 15 feet, and ice blocks weighing a few tonnes blown by the wind. Shoes with bolts screwed to the bottom are worn to keep their traction on the ice.

== History ==
Ice canoeing has been practiced since the beginnings of New France in the 1600s, as the only way to cross the Saint Lawrence River when there is too much ice for ferries, but not enough to form an ice bridge. In the 1860s more than 200 canoers, mostly at Lévis, provided transportation for passengers and goods. Ice canoeing was practiced in Montreal from the early 1800s. The advent of steamboats capable of breaking through the ice put an end to icecanoeing as a means of transportation in the late 1800s.

In 1894, the first race was organised between Lévis and the Port of Quebec at the first Quebec Winter Carnival. In Montreal races were held during the Fête des Neiges de Montréal from 1988 to 1992. In 2013, Héritage Maritime Canada relaunched the race as the Défi canot à glace Bota Bota. Since the 1990s races have also been held at Toronto, Windsor, Gatineau, Trois-Rivières, Chicoutimi and the Isle-aux-Coudres.

Women have competed since 1987.

Ice canoeing is still utilized as a means of travel for those that live on McKenzie Island, Ontario. During the “break up” and “freeze up” the local ferry can not run due to ice breaking up in the spring, and forming in the fall. This necessitates the need for other modes of transportation, or finding alternative accommodations for the locals affected during this time.

== Competition ==
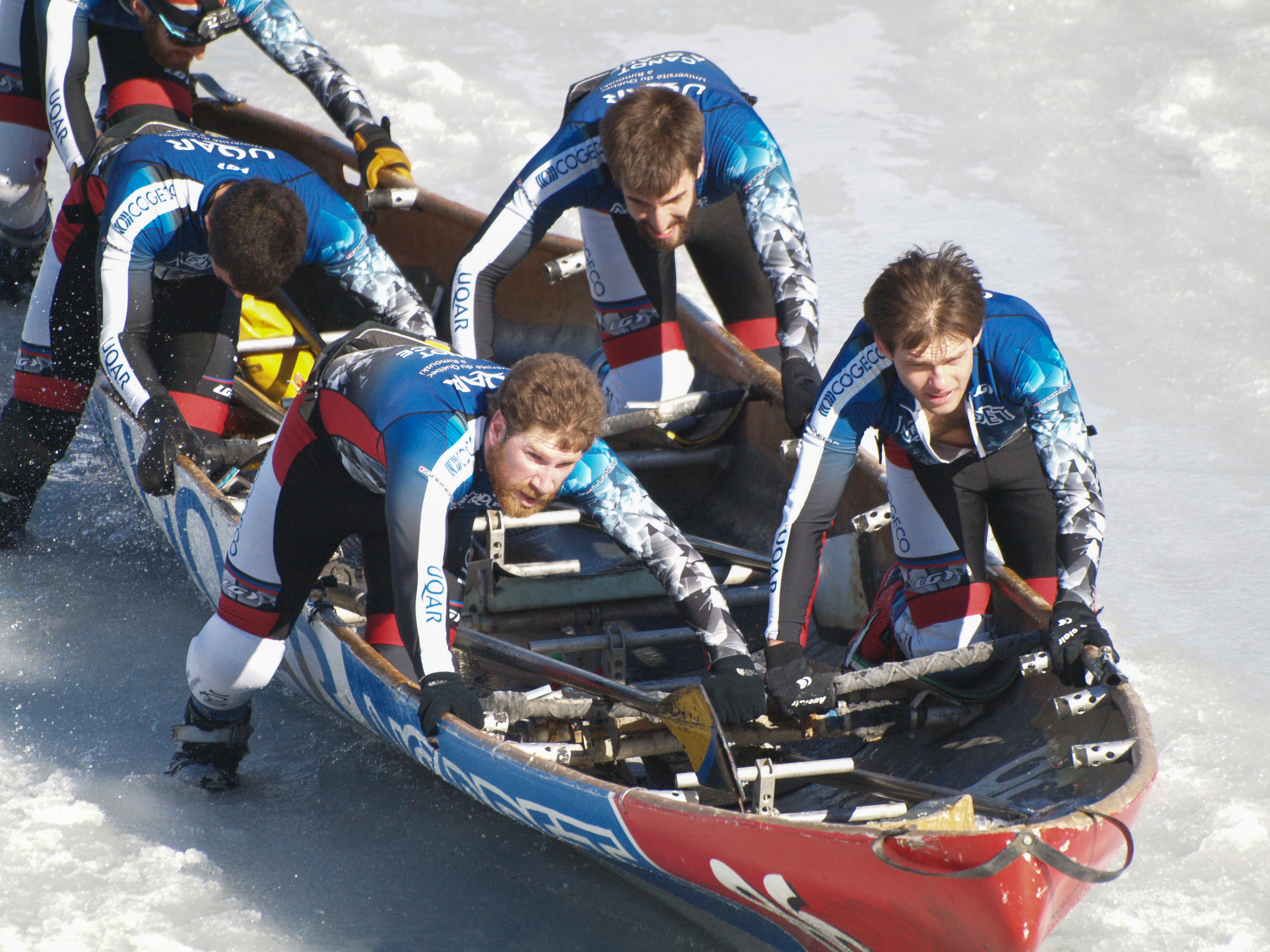
Défi canot à glace Bota Bota 2014

The Association des Coureurs en Canot à Glace du Québec (ACCGQ) was formed in 1984 to organise and standardise races. Six races are accredited by the ACCGQ: La Grande Traversée Casino de Charlevoix, La Course en canot du Carnaval, La course de la banquise de Portneuf, Trois-Rivières Extrême, le Défi Canot à Glace Montréal, and le Grand Défi des Glaces. The latter is the biggest event. It is run during the Quebec Winter Carnival, at Quebec City every February. More than 40 teams compete (78 boats in 2025), struggling with the powerful current, large chunks of ice and cold water. The Quebec City area is the centre of ice canoeing activity, but there are teams elsewhere in the province of Quebec. A crew from Calgary has competed in the race for at least 41 years. The race has also seen teams from Chicago and France.

Athletes compete in three classes: elite men, elite women, and sport, the latter comprising crews of men, and crews of mixed men and women.

Originally wooden, canoes are now made with epoxy and fibreglass with an internal metal frame. The minimum weight of a canoe is 250 pounds (110 kg) for the sport and elite men classes, and 225 pounds (102 kg) for elite women. The length of the boat must be between 6 metres (20 ft) and 28 feet 2 inches (8.59 m). Boats must contain 100 litres of flotation material, and it must be possible to float the boat with 700 litres of water on board. Canoes must be brightly-coloured and not painted white.
