= Gravity biking =

Downhill bicycle racing under gravity

Gravity biking is a sport involving riding specially adapted bicycles down steep hills at high speeds. It is popular in the United States, Thailand, Brazil, Italy, Australia and Colombia.

At an official event in 2017, Cedric Touchette (CAN) reached a speed of 126.31 km/h (78.48 mph), which was considered a world record.

Unofficial racing on open roads is risky, and since 2018 is banned in the town of La Ceja in Antioquia, Colombia after a series of deaths and serious injuries. In February 2023, infobae reported that 35 gravity bikers had died in Antioquia and in September 2024, 20 death were reported for the last few months. The bikers often wear little or no protective gear or helmets during descent although they can reach speeds of up to 120km/h.

The "International Gravity Sports Association" used to organize gravity bike competitions from 2002 to 2019, but no longer holds sanctioned Gravity Bike races.
