= President's Cup Regatta =

The President's Cup Regatta was an annual yacht race in the Philippines that attracted competitors from all over the world. It was one of the highly anticipated sports tourism events in the Philippines. The race, organized by the Manila Yacht Club, took place between 1997 and 2009. The race was replaced by the Commodore's Cup, organized by Subic Bay Sailing Club. In 2019, the Commodore's Cup was replaced by the Chairman's Cup regatta.

== History ==
In 1993 a local sailing event was organized called The Easter Regatta which drew five local participants sailing from Subic Bay to Caylabne Bay in the mouth of Manila Bay. Merkano, an S&S36 skippered by Azelio Beano, won the Racing class, while Airtight Garage, a Humprhies half tonner skippered by Alan Burrel, won the Cruising class. The pioneer organizers of the event were MYC Commodore Ray Ordoveza, MYC Race Committee Chairman George Hackett, Jerry Rollin, and Allen Lundy.

The next year, the organizers of the Easter Regatta suggested to the Royal Hong Kong Yacht Club, organizers of the China Sea Race (a biannual race from Hong Kong to Manila Bay), to integrate the Easter Regatta into their race schedule. A course was made to race from off Manila Yacht Club, to Corregidor island, and then a next leg from Corregidor to Subic Bay. That sparked the interest of international participants.

In 1995, though a China Sea Race "off year", attracted more international participants as the RHKYC organizes the Hong Kong to San Fernando race. Participants of this race readily sailed down the coast to Subic Bay to participate in the Easter Regatta held in Subic Bay. Big names included Neil Pryde, Olympic yachtsman Grey Gibson, and Andy Lam and Joy Ride a J35 which won the previous year's China Sea Race series.

In 1996, RHKYC and MYC decided to organize the finish of the China Sea Race at Subic Bay, this meant that there were more boats interested in joining the Easter Regatta as well. Beau Geste, an ILC skippered by Karl Kwok, as well as local boats Vida of Ray Ordoveza and helmed by Olympic medalist Steve Benjamin, Body Shots, helmed by J24 world champion David Bedford, Suicide Blond a Mumm 36 and another Mumm 36 Intabinda chartered by Neil Pryde after his boat Boogie Flash suffered damage six hours after the start of China Sea Race, he returned to Hong Kong and flew to Manila and then to Subic to join the racing.

== The President's Cup ==
Then Philippine President Fidel V. Ramos, impressed by the success of Ray Ordoveza's "Vida" in the China Sea Race and Easter Regatta, encouraged the Manila Yacht Club to organize an International regatta at Subic in 1997. Thus the Easter Regatta was renamed "The President's Cup Regatta". A perpetual trophy was specially designed for the President's Cup. The first President's Cup Regatta also drew participation from one-design sportsboats, to dinghies to beach catamarans. All in all 81 boats participated in the event with participants and crew from all over the world including North America, Europe, New Zealand and of course Hong Kong. Local participants included "Vida", "Triple V Centennial" a Bashford 36 skippered by Thomas Hovenshiold. Triple V Centennial became the first yacht name to be engraved on the base of the perpetual trophy of the President's Cup Regatta.

In 1998, the China Sea Race organizers decided that the President's Cup Regatta should be the inshore series part of the China Sea Race thus scores in the President's Cup counted towards the China Sea Race series. This assured international participation in the President's Cup from then on. That year saw new boats being raced to contest the coveted perpetual trophy. No less than 3 new Sydney 46s owned by Neil Pryde, Klaus Lienau and the Subic Centential Syndicate.

"Karakoa", Ray Ordoveza's new Excel 53, was the winner of the perpetual trophy, while "Hocux Pocux" of David Kong won the China Sea Race series. "Team Windshear / Jo de Ros", George and Rainbow Hackett's J-35 won the Cruiser/Racer Class. "Tatoosh" won the Cruising class.

The President's Cup has not taken place since 2009 when the Commodore's Cup was moved by Saturday Afternoon Gentleman Sailing (SAGS) to replace it. This led to the Manila Yacht Club filing a Temporary Rerstraining Order (TRO) against the Subic Bay sailing group SAGS and Jerry Rollin.

In 2019, the Chairman's Cup Regatta replaced the Commodore's Cup.
