= Pete Cabrinha =

American athlete and entrepreneur (born 1961)

Personal information
- Full name: Peter Cabrinha
- Born: September 13, 1961 (age 65) Oahu, Hawaii
- Occupation: Athlete
- Height: 5 ft 10 in (178 cm)
- Weight: 145 lb (66 kg)
- Spouse: Lisa Letarte Cabrinha
- Other interests: Art
- Website: www.cabrinha.com

Sport
- Sport: Surfing, Windsurfing, Kitesurfing, Foilboarding, Wingfoiling

Pete Cabrinha (born September 13, 1961 on Oahu, Hawaii) is an American big-wave surfer, windsurfer, kitesurfer and artist. He is the founder and brand manager of Cabrinha Kites.

== Career ==
=== Windsurfing ===
In 1985 he won the world wave sailing championship.

=== Tow-surfing ===
In 1993, Cabrinha and his friends Laird Hamilton, Dave Kalama, Rush Randle, Brett Lickle, Mike Waltze, Mark Angulo, Derrick Doerner, and Buzzy Kerbox started to experiment in big surf on the North Shore of Maui and invented a spin off called tow-surfing. They called themselves the "Strapped Crew”. Using a personal watercraft to tow themselves into large waves they set out to explore the outer limits of big wave surfing.

=== Kiteboarding ===
In the late 90s, Cabrinha experimented with kites and helped pioneer the sport of kiteboarding. Together with his friend Dan Bolfing, Cabrinha began to design kiteboards under the Cabrinha label. In 2000 Cabrinha joined forces with the Pryde Group and Cabrinha Kites was born. The company launched their first product line in 2000 and as of 2019 was selling kiteboarding equipment in over 70 countries.

=== Foilboarding and wingsurfing ===
Foilboarding and wingsurfing are other hybrid surf sports which Cabrinha helped to pioneer and later industrialize.

== Artist life ==
A son to an artist mother, Cabrinha pursued the arts for over three decades. His mixed media art works combine his photography and graphic design skills with off-center painting techniques.

== Personal life ==
Cabrinha lives on Maui with his wife, former windsurfer and fashion designer Lisa Letarte Cabrinha, and his daughter, Tahiti Cabrinha.

== Titles ==
- 1985 WSMA World Champion (Wave Performance)
- 2004 Billabong XXL Award, World Record: Largest wave ever ridden

== Media appearances ==
=== Movies and documentaries ===
- The Longest Wave, 2019
- The Excellent Life, 2019
- Take every wave: The Life of Laird Hamilton, 2017
- Strapped: The Origins of Tow-In Surfing, 2002
- Wake up Call, 1996
- Upwind
- Tradewind: The Wavesailing Film, 1984
- Zalman King film In God’s Hands, 1998

=== Other media appearances ===
- Kiteboarding Magazine, "The Link between Surfing and Art", October 2019.
- The Hawaiian Pioneers, "Chapter One: The Kiteboard Legacy Begins", Audiobook, 2018.
- Looking Sideways Podcast, 2018.
- Adventure Sports Network, The Evolution of Pete Cabrinha: 4 Decades at the Cutting Edge of Watersports, 2018.
- Liquid Salt Mag, Interview, 2018.
- Time Magazine: Top 100 Innovators, September 2001.
