= Hebe Haven Yacht Club =

Hebe Haven Yacht Club (HHYC)
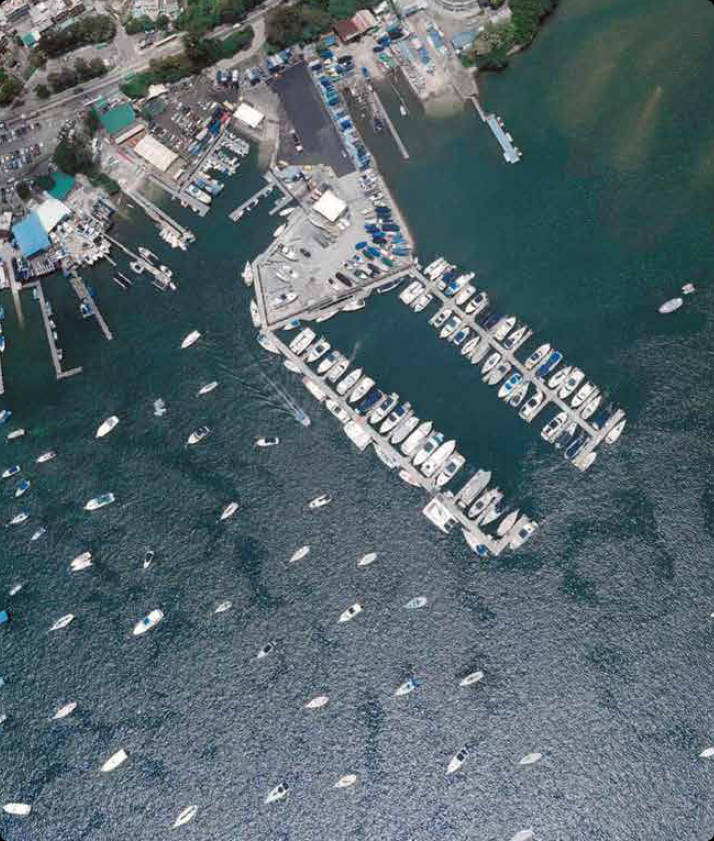
- Drone View of Hebe Haven Yacht Club
- Formation: 1963
- Legal status: Active
- Purpose: Advocate and public voice, educator and network for Recreational boating, and competitive sailors, coaches, volunteers and events
- Location: 10.5 Miles Hiram's Highway, Pak Sha Wan, Sai Kung District, Hong Kong
- Official language: English, Cantonese, Chinese
- Commodore: Sonny Payne
- Affiliations: Royal Hong Kong Yacht Club and Aberdeen Boat Club
- Website: Hebe Haven Yacht Club

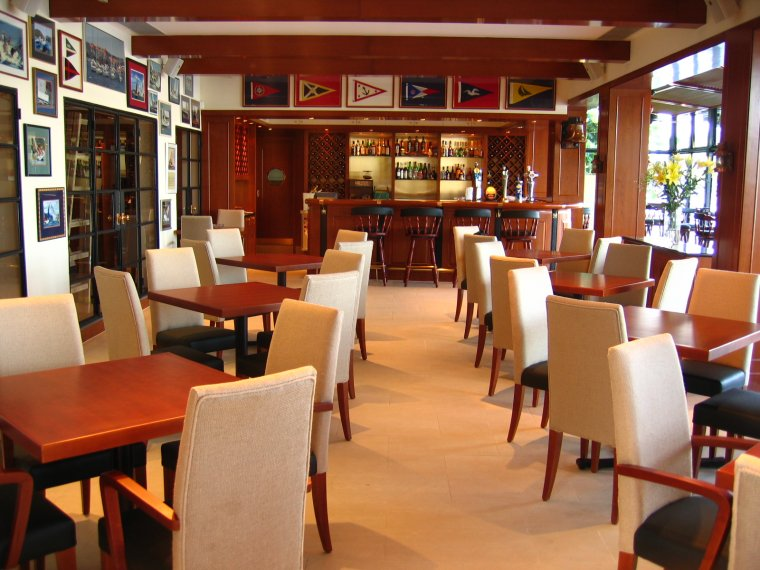
The club restaurant and bar

Hebe Haven Yacht Club established in 1963, is a private members club located in the bay of Pak Sha Wan (Hebe Haven) in Sai Kung District, Hong Kong.

== Objectives ==
The Club's main objectives are to unite boat owners and promote boating activities and to provide boating facilities. Since its inception, the members have worked hard to maintain the boating character of their club. Most are water sport enthusiasts and are keen to see the club remain focused on its roots.

== Facilities and operations ==
The Club has comprehensive marine facilities at competitive prices, when compared to the other main yacht club's in Hong Kong, Royal Hong Kong Yacht Club and Aberdeen Boat Club. The Club currently has 240 swing moorings and hard standings and provides slipping and craning services and boat repair and maintenance facilities. In 2003 an extension to the Club increased the hard standing and provided extra marina berthing.

== Racing ==
Yacht racing is very popular among Hebe members and races are held almost every weekend. The most popular series for cruisers in Hong Kong, the "Typhoon Series" attracts a significant number of entrants every summer. Participation is open to all.

== Sail training ==
The Club owns 50 dinghies and runs dinghy sail training courses for members and non members. The club's fleet includes 10 Optimists, 15 Laser Pico, 9 Laser Standard, 4 Laser Bahia, 4 Laser Stratos and 1 VX-One. Dinghy racing and supervised dinghy practice sessions are held almost every weekend with enthusiasm for this being led by the junior members of the Club. The Club also now runs an annual 24 Hour Charity Dinghy Race every autumn where other clubs and organizations are encouraged to participate. The sailing centre manager is Rob Allen and he has taken the Sail Training centre to new heights. The club also employs approximately a dozen Assistant Instructors from within the club's junior sailors to assist with operations.

== Sailability ==
Based at Hebe Haven Yacht Club in Sai Kung, Sailability offers bilingual sailing programs to people of all abilities, genders, ages, and backgrounds, promoting inclusivity and accessibility. Recognized by World Sailing as Asia’s most advanced para sailing center, it focuses on therapeutic, educational, and rehabilitative experiences, helping participants build confidence, skills, and mental wellness. The program supports sailors with physical disabilities, SEN, and ASD, some of whom have won international medals. Operated by 90% volunteers and reliant on donations, Sailability also provides pathways for competitive sailing at local and international levels.
