= China Sea Race =

Biennial yacht race

The Rolex China Sea Race (Chinese: 劳力士中国海帆船赛) is a biennial event hosted by the Royal Hong Kong Yacht Club, starting in Hong Kong Harbour and finishing in Subic Bay, Philippines. The race distance is approximately 565 nautical miles (1046.38 km). The first race was held in 1962. Between 1997 and 2009 the President´s Cup Regatta, held in Manila Bay and Subic Bay, was the in-shore part of the China Sea Race.
