= Foilboard =

Surfboard with a downward-extending hydrofoil

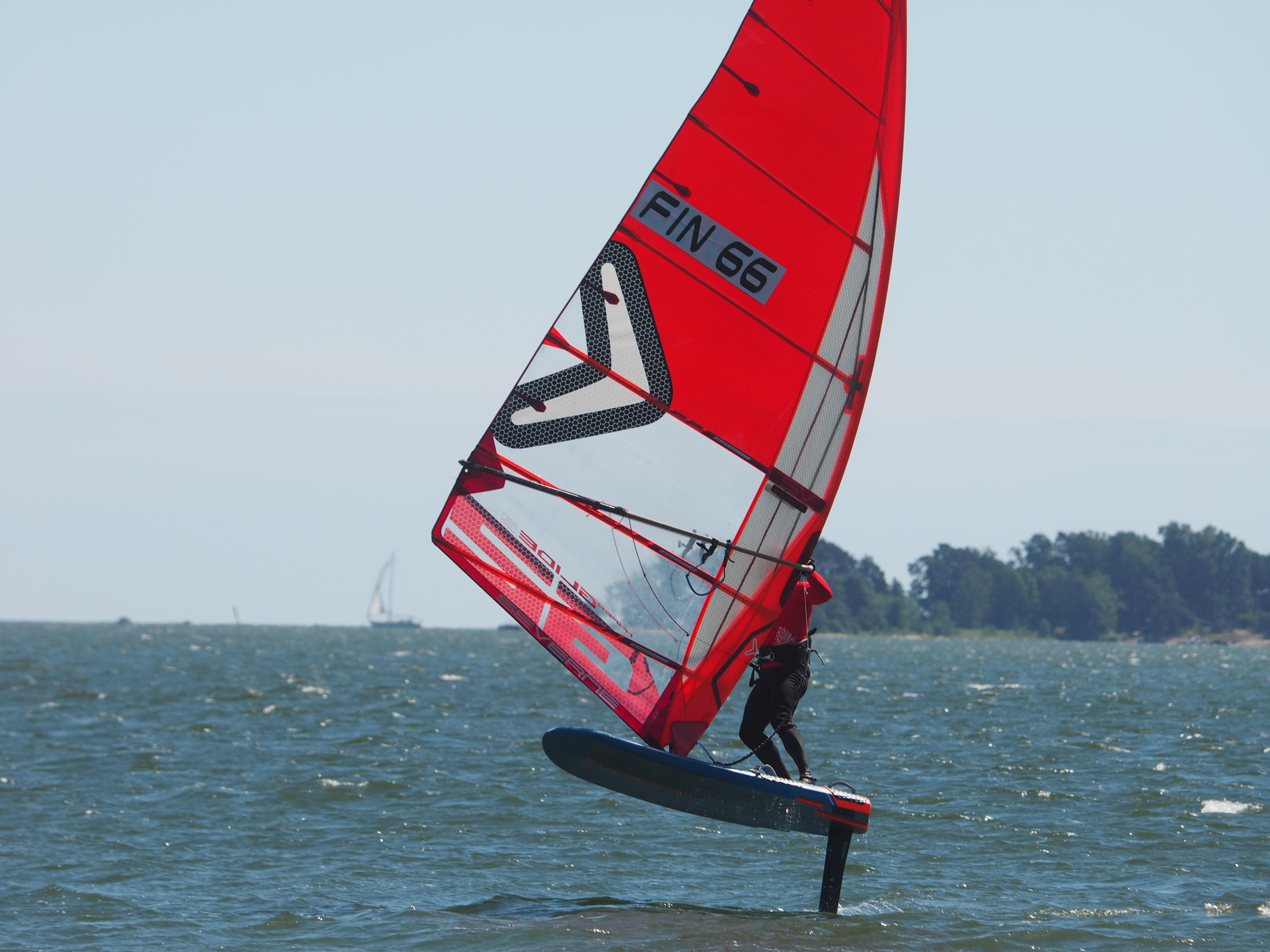
Windsurfing using a board fitted with a hydrofoil

A foilboard, also known as a hydrofoil board or foil surfboard, is a type of board used in water sports; it is distinct from surfboards in that it has a hydrofoil rather than fins mounted underneath. This hydrofoil design allows the surfboard and its rider to rise above the water’s surface, allowing for fast speeds and increased maneuverability in a wide range of surf conditions. Foilboards are becoming increasingly popular across many water sports, including surfing, kiteboarding, windsurfing, and wakeboarding. Foilboards have also been used in competitions, with riders reaching speeds of up to 30 km/h while performing acrobatic maneuvers such as flips and twists.

== History ==
In the late 1990s and early 2000s, Laird Hamilton, an influential big wave surfer and waterman, began experimenting with attaching hydrofoils to surfboards, with the aim of achieving faster speeds and smoother rides on large waves. Laird Hamilton later discovered the foilboard's capability to harness swell energy with the use of a jet ski, pulling the rider into a wave.

Professional waterman Kai Lenny is widely credited with accelerating modern hydrofoil progression in big-wave surfing and downwind foiling through high-profile videos and competition appearances.

== Design and components ==
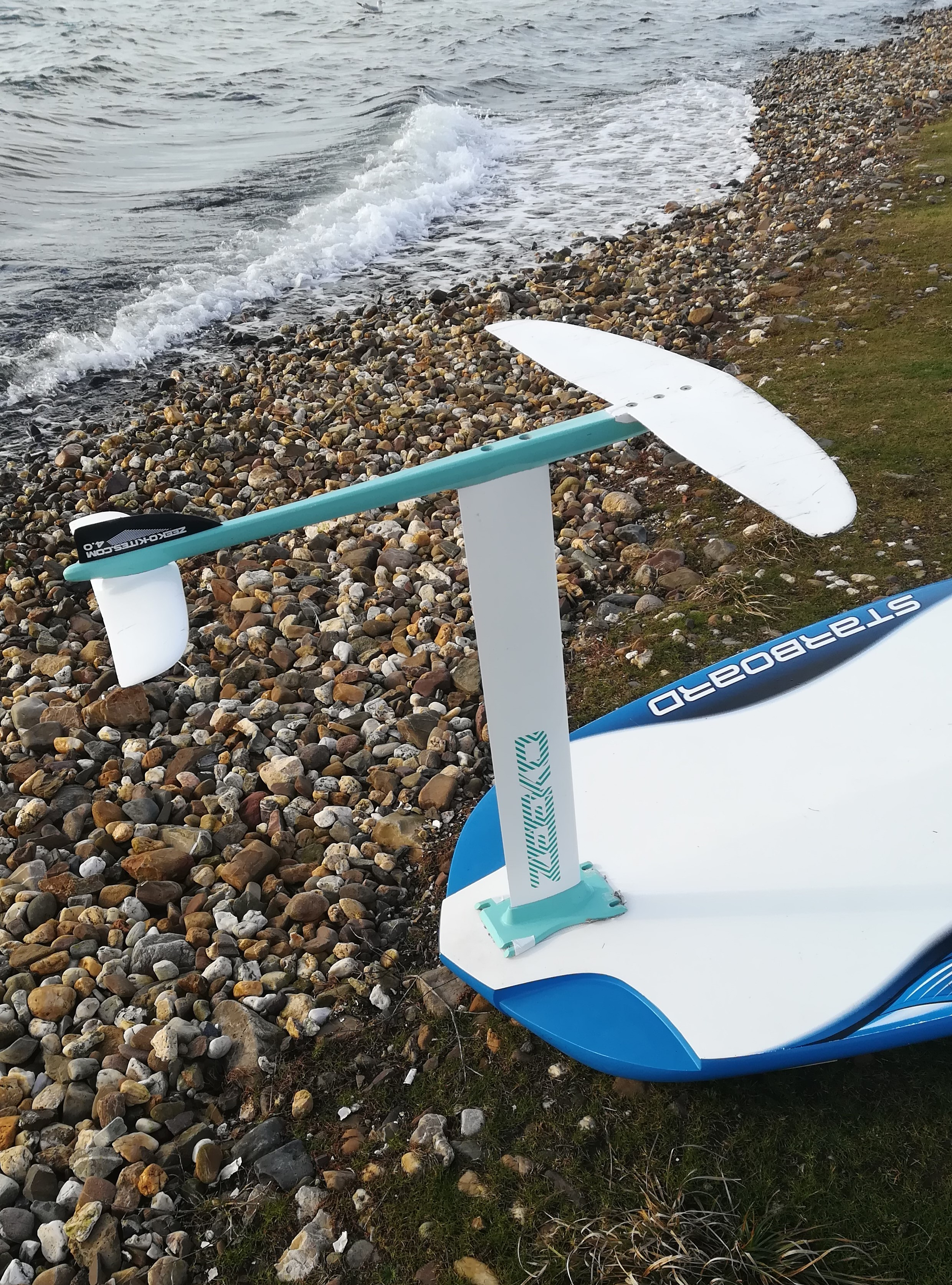
Hydrofoil structure on a windsurf board

The design of a foilboard consists of two primary components: the board and the hydrofoil. The board is usually made from lightweight materials such as carbon fiber or foam, making it easier to lift above the water. Attached to the bottom of the board is the hydrofoil, which consists of the mast as well as the front and back wings. The front wing is responsible for providing lift, while the back wing helps with stability and maneuverability. The mast, usually made with carbon fiber, connects the bottom of the board with the hydrofoil, keeping it submerged in the water in order to generate lift. Foilboards also typically have foot straps or pads for the riders to secure their feet to the board so they can control their balance as they approach higher speeds and move with greater agility.

Hydrofoils work by generating lift as they move through water, lifting the board out of the water and reducing drag. As water flows over the hydrofoil, it creates a pressure differential that causes the water to push up on the foil, generating lift. Adding a hydrofoil to a board can significantly increase the speed and efficiency because of the reduced drag from the much lower wetted area, allowing the rider to reach greater speeds proportional to the lift generated from the wind on the sail; because of this, hydrofoils are extremely popular in racing and high performance applications.

=== Types of hydrofoils ===
Foilboards can be categorized into three main types based on the shape of the hydrofoil wing, each of which caters to different ability levels.

==== Flat-wing ====
Flat-wing hydrofoils have a straight, flat wing profile that are known for their stability and ease of use, making them ideal for beginners or recreational users. They are relatively inexpensive compared to other types of hydrofoils and are also commonly seen on yachts, boats, and surfboards.

== Disciplines ==
=== Windsurfing ===
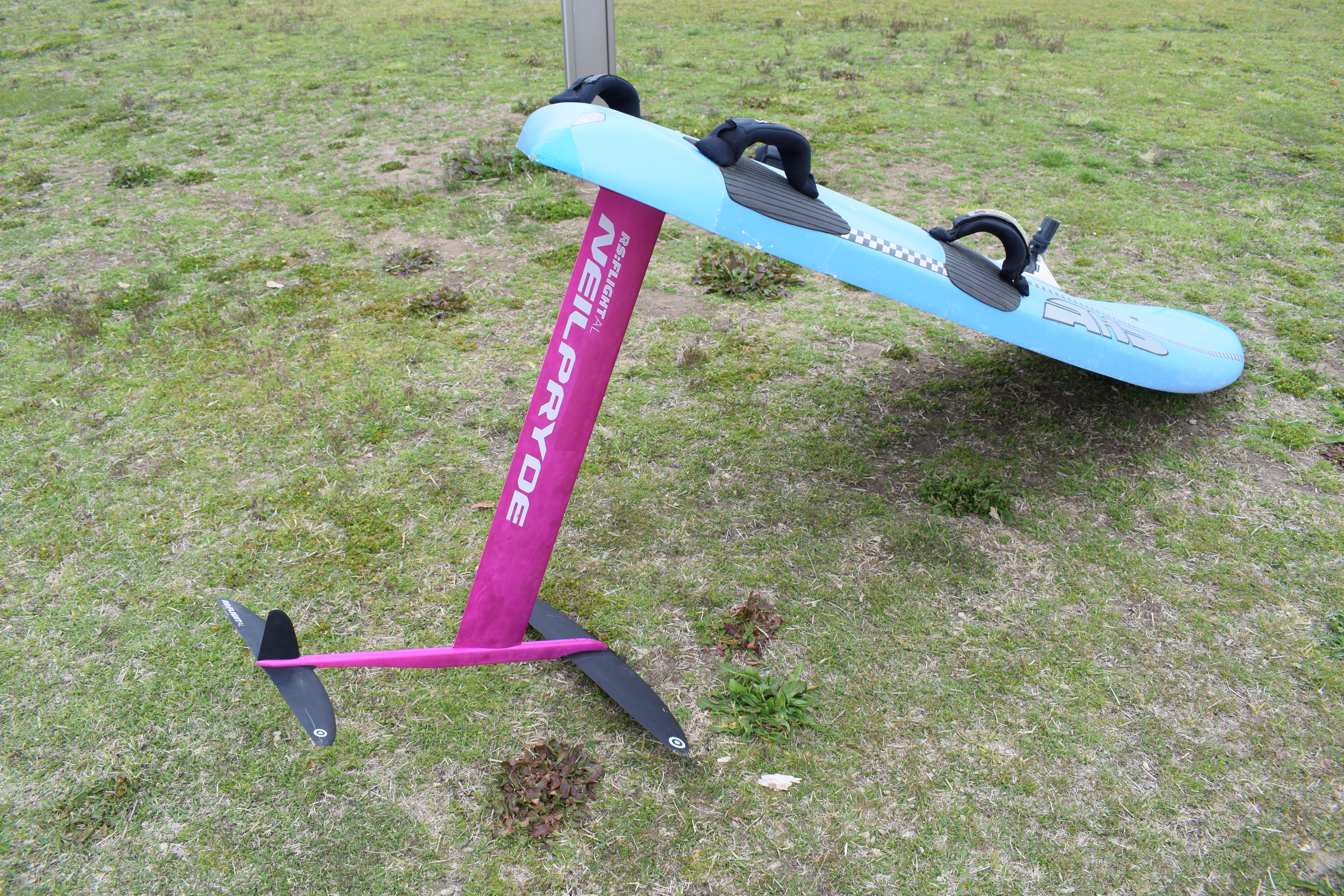
Hydrofoil on a windsurf board

Rush Randle, an acrobatic surfer and big wave windsurfer, is credited with being the first ever to mount a hydrofoil to a windsurfing board, performing forward loops with the hydrofoil mounted below on the outer reefs of Maui.

Foils are used on wind-surfboards through design development from Neil Pryde Maui, inventors of hydrofoil sailing "windsurfing" boards. Using a moderately sized sail, a foil windboard can achieve speeds over 6 knots faster than the apparent wind. With advancements in hydrofoil design the energy required to stay on foil was reduced to levels achievable by human power alone. Kai Lenny pioneered a technique now called "pumping" in which the rider shifts their weight over the axis of rotation, driving the foil through the water column which generates lift.

=== Kiteboarding ===
Hydrofoil kiteboards are foilboards which use a kite as their mode of propulsion.

The hydrofoil minimizes the effects of choppy or rough conditions. Due to the hydrofoil's underwater characteristics, the rider can angle higher into the wind than on traditional kiteboards which ride on the surface of the water.

On the Island of Maui, Mango Carafino began the development of fabricating hydrofoil boards for riding with the use of a kite. Carafino later went on to fabricate Carafino Hydrofoil foil boards in China, at the Jin Li factory, with the assistance of Maurico Bauldi and Paulo Iannetti. For over ten years, the world laughed at Carafino, calling him a kook for introducing a board too futuristic for the industry to accept.

Carafino introduced the hydrofoil in 2008 in Frejus, Cote 'd Azur, France. There the French began to race with the Carafino hydrofoil board, creating the competitive aspect of hydrofoil kite board racing. The sport later went on to experience back yard designers tweaking the foils to garner more speed when racing. Finally, the Olympic sailing federation incorporated the hydrofoil kiteboard into the Olympic class. In 2014 Carafino left the industry, apparently as a result of the flood of competition and knockoffs of his design. Laird Hamilton innovated the use of the board riding in swells with the assistance of expert waterman Terry Chun of Kauai, North Shore.

=== Wing foiling ===
Another application of the foilboard is in Wing foiling, where propulsion is derived from a lightweight handheld wing controlled by the rider.

=== Surf foiling ===
Surf foiling involves riding ocean or lake waves using the lift of the hydrofoil rather than the power of the breaking wave itself. This allows riders to glide above the surface and to link multiple waves in a single ride.

=== Downwind foiling ===
Downwind foiling is a discipline in which riders use ocean swells or lake bumps to travel long distances with minimal drag, often without relying on breaking waves.

=== Pump foiling ===
Pump foiling, including dock-start foiling, is an unpowered discipline in which the rider generates and maintains momentum through body movement rather than wind or wave energy.

== Olympic events ==
Windfoiling debuted as an Olympic event in 2024 with foil windsurfing and kitefoiling represented. For the former, the Starboard IQFoil gear was adopted.

Events involving foiling

Event	Foiling Model
Men's Windsurfer Women's Windsurfer	IQFoil
Men's and Women's Kite	Formula Kite
Mixed Two Person Multihull	Nacra 17

== Powered foilboards ==
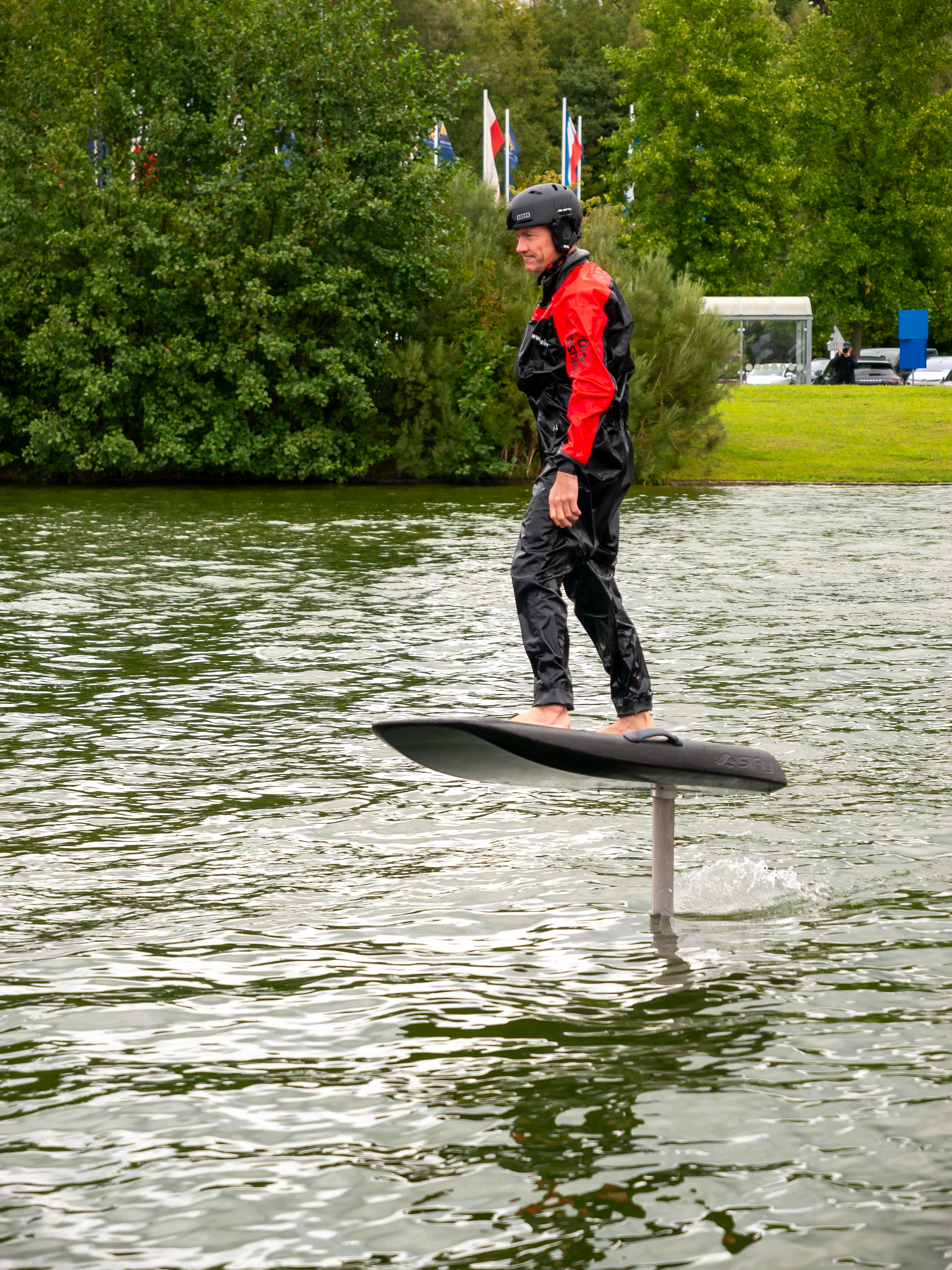
An e-foil in action, Interboot 2023, Friedrichshafen

Various manufacturers and individuals have developed powered foilboards. Electrically powered ones are often referred to as eFoils. EFoils have a mast connected to an electric motor.

Foil-assist systems use compact electric drives to provide thrust primarily for takeoff, after which the rider maintains flight without continuous power.

=== Notable journeys ===
In 2021 a father and son crossed the English Channel on electric-powered propeller-driven hydrofoil boards. They covered 23 miles in one hour and 44 minutes at an average speed of 13 mph on a single battery charge, arriving with 4% charge left.

On July 19, 2024, 65 year old Bryan Holland circumnavigated Lake Winnipesaukee in New Hampshire via eFoil. Holland’s course visited the five ports of the MS Mount Washington as part of an Annual Rafting for Wishes Make-A-Wish fundraising event. Holland’s route was Weirs Beach, Meredith, Center Harbor, Wolfeboro, Alton Bay returning to the start and completing the 60 mile circumnavigation in 4 hours, 50 minutes. Having reserve energies, Holland continued on and finished his epic ride in Meredith clocking a total 68.87 miles in 5 hours, 15 minutes. During the ride, Holland was accompanied by a support boat and swapped five different batteries.

== Gallery ==
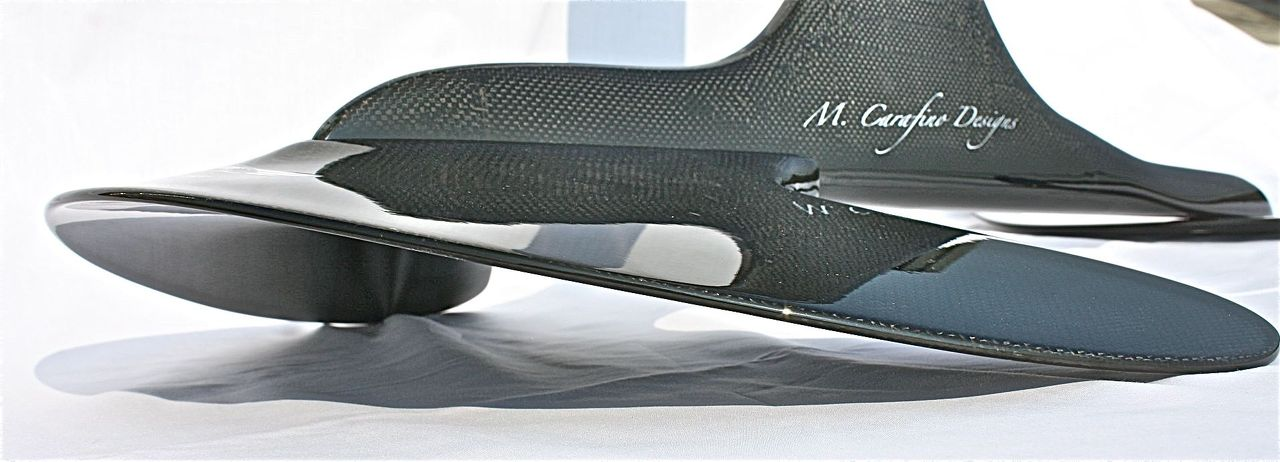
Foil by Mango Carafino

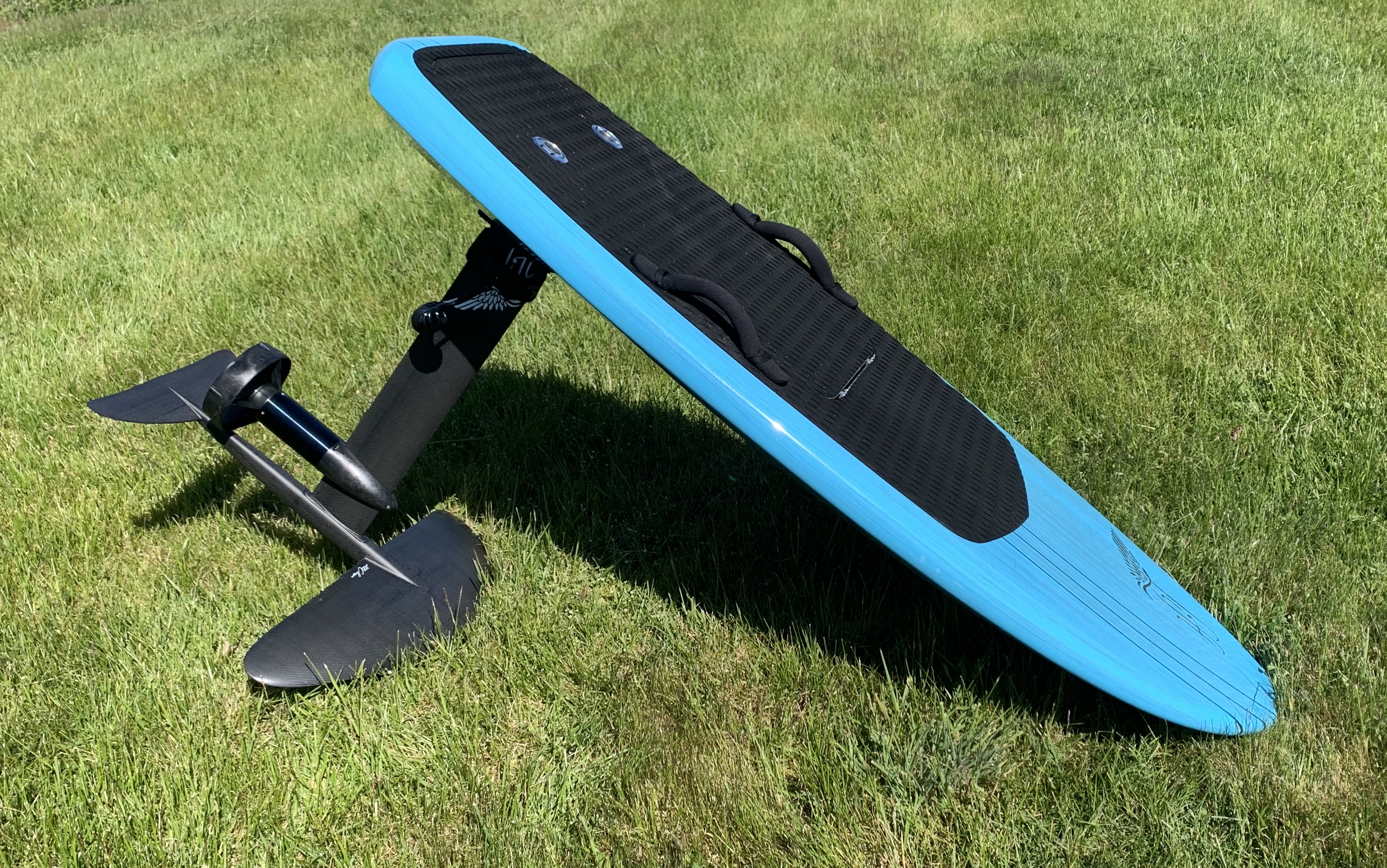
The Lift eFoil, an electric hydrofoil surfboard

== See also ==
- Windfoiling
- Wing foiling
- IQFoil – Windsurfing class
