= Shriro =

Shriro Group
- Type: private
- Founded: Harbin
- Headquarters: Hong Kong, China
- Number of locations: 16 countries (2007)
- Area served: Worldwide
- Products: Flow Snowboarding, Neil Pryde Ltd.
- Services: marketing, distribution
- Number of employees: 3,500 (2006)
- Website: www.shriro.com

Shriro Group is a private company headquartered in Hong Kong. It is an international marketing and distribution company with over 3,500 employees around the world.

In 1906 the Shriro family moved from the Russian Empire to Harbin, Northeast China and founded a trading house in the nascent city.

The first international office was set up in 1917 in Yokohama, Japan. From the early days, the business was mainly commodities and expanded rapidly after 1945 as the product line expanded and new subsidiaries opened in many South East Asian countries and Canada.

Today, Shriro offices are located in Hong Kong, mainland China, Japan, Singapore, Malaysia, Taiwan, Thailand, Vietnam, Australia, and New Zealand.

Shriro was a major distributor of medium-format camera equipment in Asia. Most of the camera business has closed down in 2021.

In 2020 D2A purchased the majority of Shriro Pacific from the Shriro family.
