= Patricia Loseby =

Hong Kong solicitor

Patricia "Pat" Loseby (1926-January 2001) was a Hong Kong solicitor. She was the first female solicitor licensed to practice in Hong Kong.

== Career ==
Loseby was enrolled as a solicitor in 1948, where she was called "the lady licensed to solicit" as Hong Kong's first female solicitor. While she was practicing law, she was given the nickname of "screwdriver" as that was how her surname was pronounced in Cantonese despite Loseby not being able to speak the language. From 1988, she served on the Inland Revenue Department board.

=== Royal Hong Kong Yacht Club ===
She was involved in a long running "friendly battle" with the Royal Hong Kong Yacht Club to allow female full members. She became a "Lady Subscriber" in 1947, however it took her thirty years of waiting before she was admitted to the Club as a Full Member. She was give the nickname "Dragon Lady" for her membership and leadership of the Dragon Class at the Club. Eventually, she and her family were allowed to move into the Commodore's flat at the clubhouse as he did not want to live in it. In 1990, Loseby was appointed as a Vice Patron of the RHKYC, one position below Queen Elizabeth II who was the Club's Patron. In 1994, she retired to Midhurst, West Sussex, England.

== Death ==
Loseby died in January 2001 in England. She was cremated and her ashes were scattered at Victoria Harbour.
