= Wing foiling =

Water sport

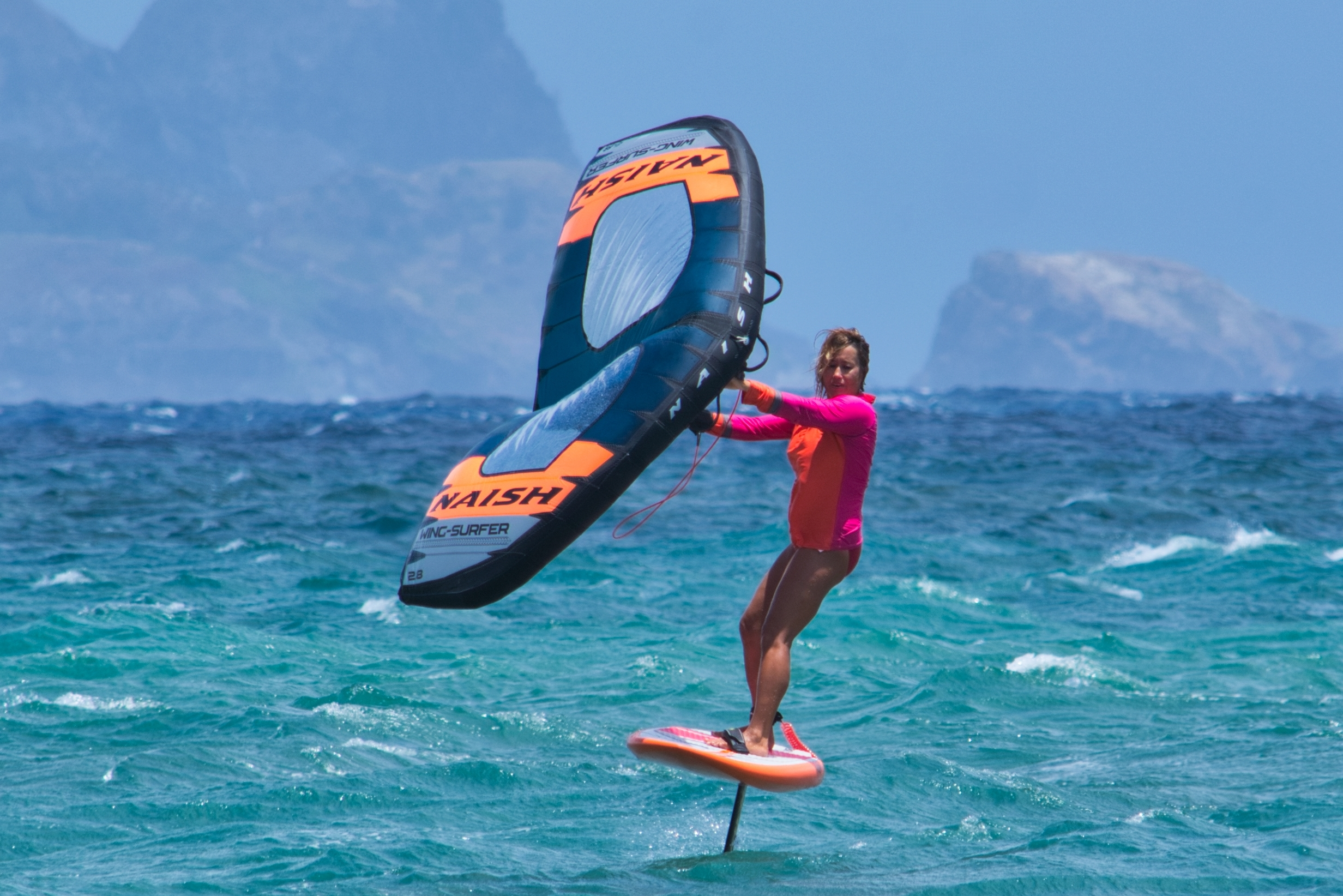
Wing foiling in Maui, Hawaii.

Wing foiling or wing surfing or winging is a wind propelled water sport that developed from kitesurfing, windsurfing and surfing. The sailor, standing on a board, holds directly onto a wing. It generates both upward force and horizontal force which can be used for propulsion and thus moves the board across the water. The recent development of foilboards, which plane very early on a hydrofoil fin and thereby lift off the water producing low friction, represent the ideal complementary hydrodynamic platform for wings.

== History ==
=== Precursors ===
The history of wing foiling, or simply "winging" begins with the invention of pre-hydrofoil technology wing surfing dating back to 1981, when aeronautical engineer Jim Drake, who also invented windsurfing, and Uli Stanciu, European windsurfing pioneer, together invented and patented the world's first wing. Their patented concept was used on a large, non-foiling windsurf board of that era. Drake's wing was theoretically based on the symmetrical shape of a flying fish. 15 years after Drake originally invented windsurfing in 1967, his updated, newer wing concept was different because it was not fixed to the board via a mast and universal joint.

Soon after, a Frenchman named Roland Le Bail designed a similar wing design. In the years that followed, new technology was adapted and wings repeatedly came onto the market in different variants. In 1986 a mast borne winged concept called Wind Weapon allowed for high jumps in locations with strong wind but like Drake's first wing, it was pre-hydrofoil technology and never gained popular support.

The use of the wings is not exclusively tied to water sports; they are also used for sports in the snow, on the beach, or land. The designations "Skate Sails", "Wind Skates" or "Kite Wings" should be mentioned as milestones in further development. What most of these variants have in common is that they use a stiff frame to stretch the wing, which also acts as handlebars or handles.

Firstly, the disadvantage of these innovations is linked to the issue of hydrodynamic resistance. In order to provide enough power to propel the normal surfboard, more weighty sail/wing construction needs to be applied. On the contrary, lighter inflatable wings used along with foilboards minimize friction and resistance.

=== Modern form ===
Tony Logosz, Slingshot Kiteboarding co-founder & designer, made the first "Slingwing" prototypes in 2011, and used it on a wind foil board with a large, high-lift foil in the Columbia Gorge. In March and April 2018, Hawaiian Flash Austin tested 3.5 m^{2} and 4 m^{2} handheld wings on a SUPfoil in Maui. Inspired by Flash’s success, Ken Winner began working on inflatable wings again and the sport as we know it was born. Duotone started marketing their Ken Winner-designed inflatable wing in the spring of 2019. From the summer 2019, Robby Naish and other kitesurf manufacturers were offering inflatable wings. Pete Cabrinha, winner of the World Wave Sailing Championship in 1985, experimented with wings, foils and kites and helped pioneer the sport of Wing Foiling and Kiteboarding.

== Construction ==
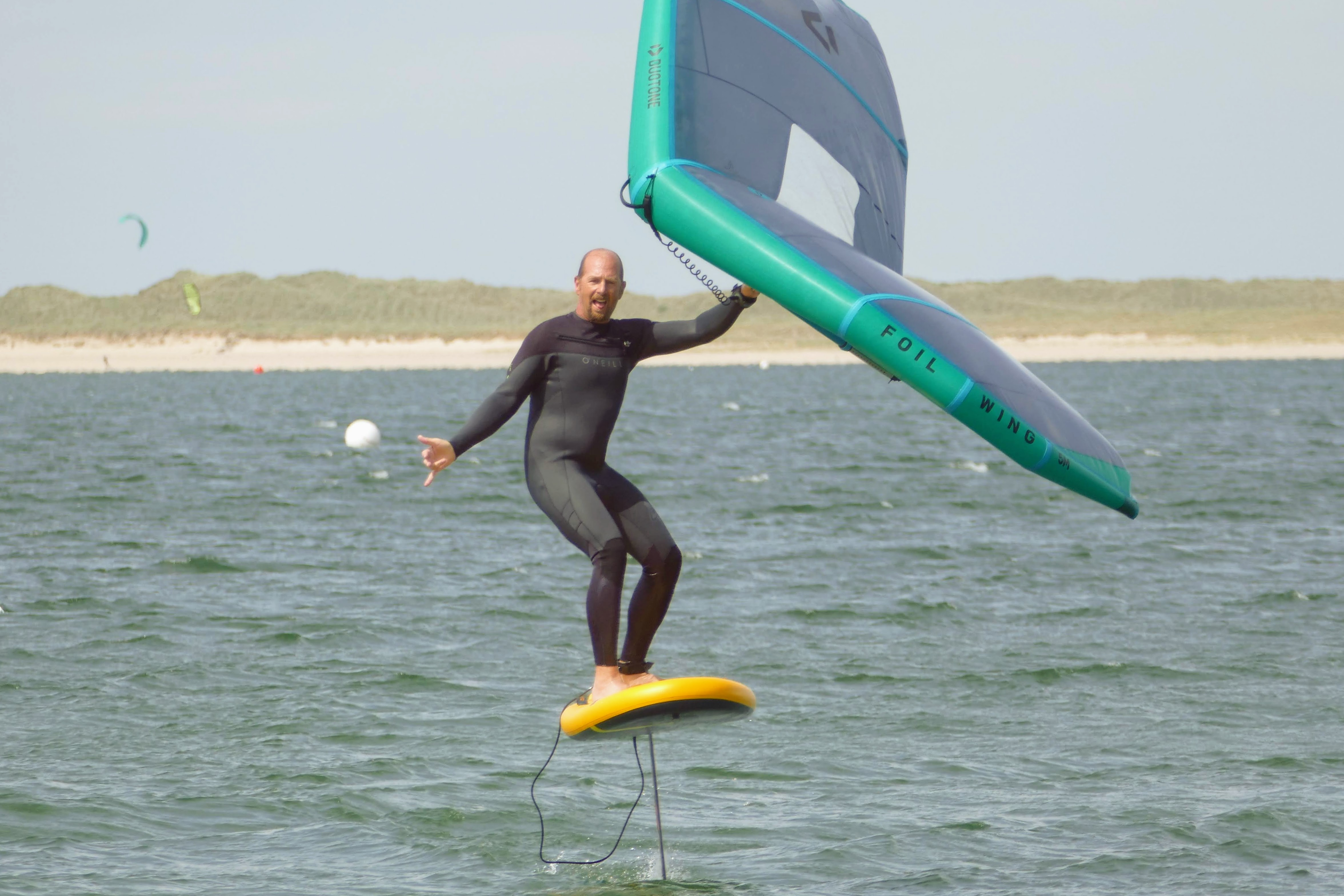
Wing foiling on an inflatable board.

The young sport is still developing. While older wing models were often stretched and held by means of rods, the influence of kite development is currently becoming increasingly important: The wing is made of light kite fabric, which is stretched by inflatable air tubes. Some brands use struts with hand straps to grip the wing, and others use aluminium or carbon fibre poles.

== Deployment variants ==
In contrast to other sports, the wing is not board-bound: it can be used while riding a surfboard, kiteboard or standup paddle board, but also in combination with a skateboard, snowboard, or even on inline skates. Wingsurfing on boards equipped with a foil is particularly popular, as it is possible to plane with small wings at around 8 knots. Wings come in different sizes; typically the smallest are around 2.2 m^{2}, and the largest around 9 m^{2}.

== Organization ==
Wing surfing companies have founded an organization for the sport called the Global Wingsports Association (GWA). They have organized a world tour starting in 2021. There are four disciplines: surf-freestyle, wave, freefly-slalom(racing) and big-air.

== Classification in the existing surfing sports ==
Technically, but also in terms of application, wingfoiling has numerous similarities to both windsurfing and kitesurfing. For example, the wing is controlled directly instead of using lines, but it still has a similar construction and functionality to a kite. The question of whether wingsurfing is a variation of kitesurfing, windsurfing or a completely independent sport is not just of a theoretical nature: it also concerns, for example, the extent to which kite bans at the spots also apply to wingsurfers.
