= Windfoiling =

Surface water sport

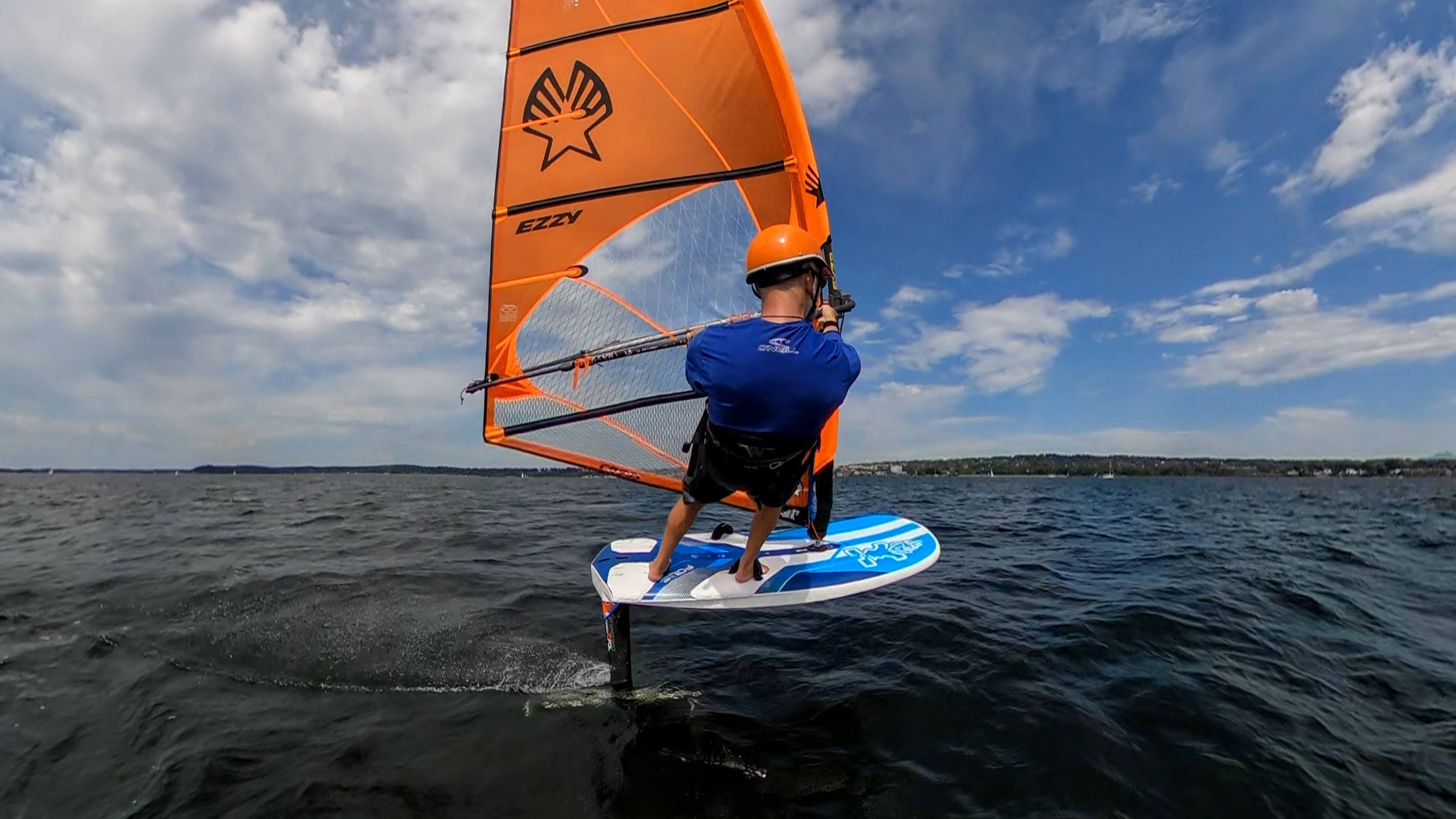
Windfoiling on Lake Champlain, near Burlington, VT, USA

Windfoiling (or foil windsurfing) is a surface water sport that is the hydrofoiling evolution of windsurfing, as well as typical sailing boats and sailing hydrofoils. It uses similar equipment to windsurfing with a normal or slightly evolved rig on a normal or specialist foil board.

== Mechanics ==
The board has a hydrofoil mounted in the fin box. The hydrofoil lifts the board off the water and enables the rider to achieve improved speeds in light winds due to the reduced drag.

The foil transmits a hydrodynamic lift force to the board, capable of lifting it out of the water. The goal is to reduce drag and increase performance.

== Olympic event debut ==
Windfoiling debuted as an Olympic event in 2024. They used the Starboard IQFoil gear.

=== Events involving foiling ===
Event	Foiling Model
Men's Windsurfer Women's Windsurfer	IQFoil
Men's and Women's Kite	Formula Kite
Mixed Two Person Multihull	Nacra 17

== See also ==
- Land windsurfing — on large skateboard, propelled by sail
- Hydrofoil board — surfboard with a hydrofoil
- Wing foiling - a lightweight wing on a surfboard with a hydrofoil
