= Neil Pryde (sailor) =

New Zealand sailor

Personal information
- Full name: Neil Frederick Pryde
- Nationality: New Zealand
- Born: 19 October 1938 (age 87)

Sport
- Sport: Sailing

Neil Pryde (born 19 October 1938) is a New Zealand sailor and businessman. He competed in the Flying Dutchman event at the 1968 Summer Olympics under the flag of Hong Kong, where he had lived for five years at the time. He subsequently established a company named Neil Pryde, and he served as chairman of it until 1 January 2015.

Since retiring, he has started Chapter2 bicycles with his son Mike, based in Auckland, New Zealand.
