= Laser Stratos =

Model of cruising and racing boat

Laser Stratos diagram

The Laser Stratos is an all-round cruising and racing boat designed by Phil Morrison and built by LaserPerformance, the same company as the famous Laser Standard dinghy. It is built from fibre-glass and foam sandwich. The Laser Stratos comes in two forms, one with a keel (similar to most yachts) and one with a centreboard (like nearly all dinghies). The centreboard version is red and the keel version is blue. The Stratos is quite spacious and most of the rigging is kept out of the way. The boat can optionally be fitted with trapeze lines and an engine bracket for carrying an outboard engine.

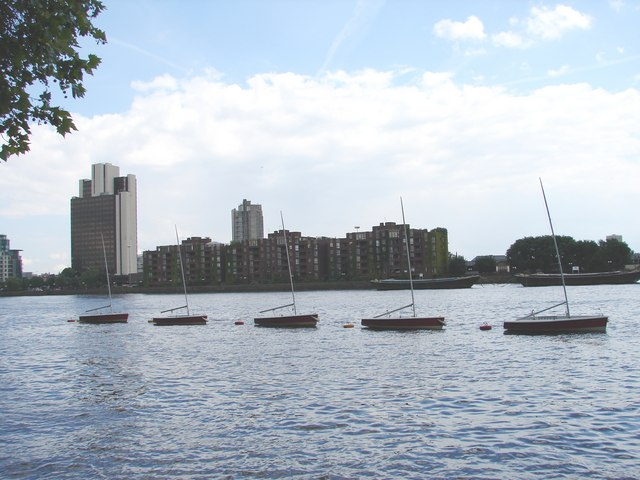
Five Laser Stratos Dinghies moored up in Westminster, London

== Dimensions ==
The Stratos is 4.94 metres (16.2 ft) long, its beam is 2.00 metres (6.56 ft) and its mast height is 7.10 metres (23.3 ft).

== Special features ==
The Stratos can be reefed in less than a minute to reduce the amount of power from the mainsail. The Stratos' Combi-Tec Mainsail includes short battens and a full-length top batten. The Stratos also has a furling jib, which means the Stratos can be fully depowered in less than ten seconds.

== Safety ==
The Stratos has many features that make it safe and fun to use for family day cruising. The Stratos has a unique system called SailSafe, which floods and self-drains tanks in the sides to help recover and keep the dinghy stable immediately after a capsize.

There have been questions over the safety of the trapeze lines when a boy drowned after he was caught in a trapeze line under a turtled Stratos in Hong Kong. A similar tragic accident happened in Kielder Water, UK with two further deaths (one related to entanglement in the trapeze and one not).

== Racing ability ==
Although the Stratos is mostly for cruising it is fairly competent at racing as well, with an asymmetrical spinnaker (gennaker) as well as an optional trapeze kit. The RYA 2012 Portsmouth Yardstick (PY) Number for the Stratos is 1092. The US Sailing D-PN is 87.3. The Stratos, however, lacks many of the features of purpose-built racing dinghies.

== End of Stratos Production ==
Over the Christmas period of 2008/2009 Laser Performance announced that they are going to cease production of the Stratos Centerboard Version immediately (possibly due to the Laser Bahia), although the keel version will still be available.
