= Royal Hong Kong Yacht Club =

Yacht club in Hong Kong

Coordinates: 22.284411°N 114.182121°E

Royal Hong Kong Yacht Club (RHKYC)
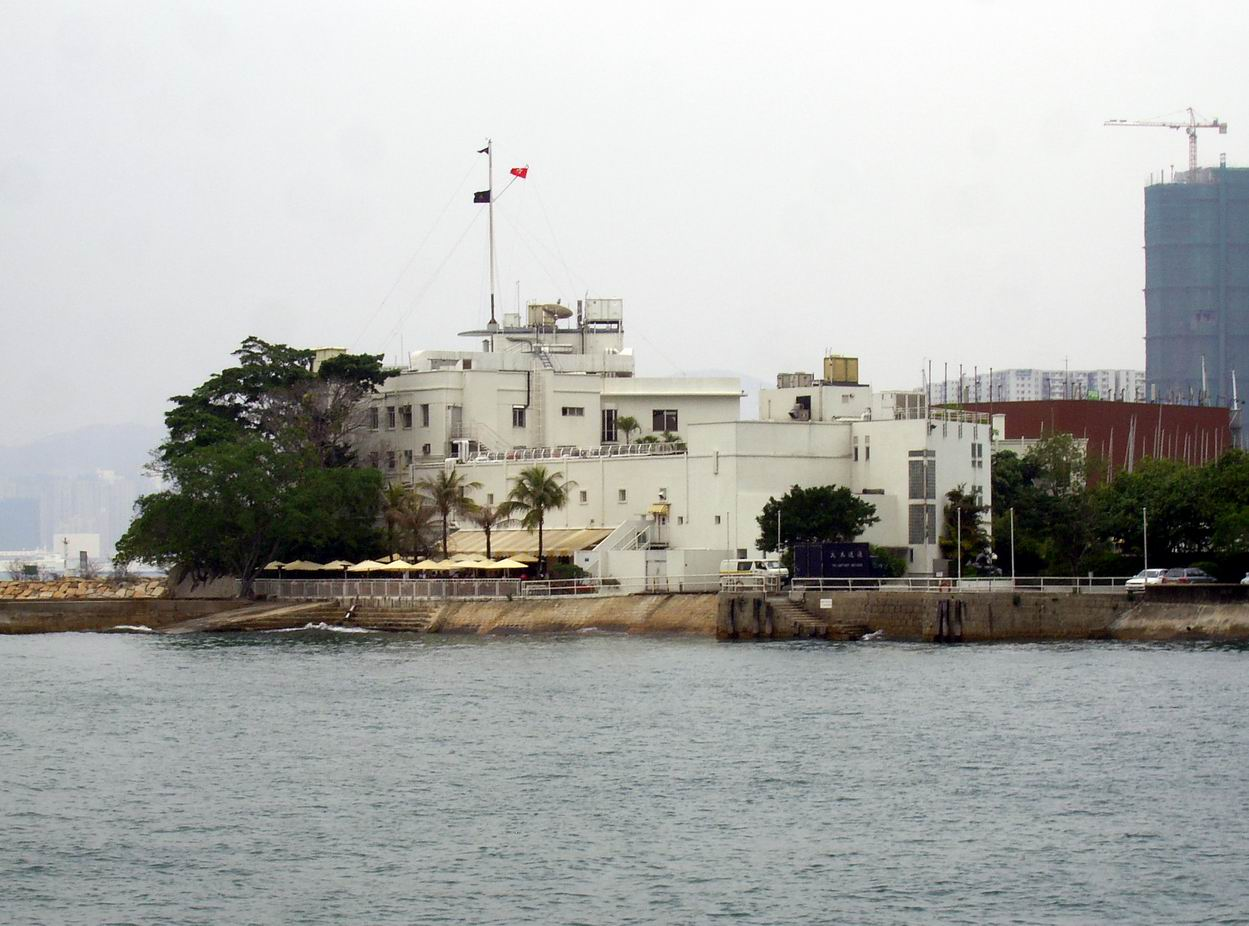
- Royal Hong Kong Yacht Club, Kellett Island, viewed from the west
- Legal status: Active
- Location: 3- Causeway Bay Victoria Harbour; Shelter Cove, Sai Kung; Middle Island in Hong Kong
- Official language: English, Chinese
- Commodore: David Norton (from 1 July 2026 for two years)
- Affiliations: Hebe Haven Yacht Club; Aberdeen Boat Club
- Website: Royal Hong Kong Yacht Club

Royal Hong Kong Yacht Club
- Traditional Chinese: 香港遊艇會
- Simplified Chinese: 香港游艇会
Transcriptions
Standard Mandarin
- Hanyu Pinyin: Xiānggǎng Yóutǐng Huì
Yue: Cantonese
- Yale Romanization: Hēung góng yàuh téhng wúih
- Jyutping: Hoeng1 gong2 jau4 teng5 wui5

The Royal Hong Kong Yacht Club (RHKYC) is one of the oldest, largest, and most prestigious sports clubs in Hong Kong, dedicated to sailing, rowing, and paddling sports. Originally established in 1849 as the Victoria Regatta Club, it officially received its royal warrant from Buckingham Palace on 15 May 1894. Unique among local institutions, the club retained the "Royal" prefix in its English name following the 1997 handover.

== History ==
In 1849 the Victoria Regatta Club was formed and later absorbed into the Hong Kong Boating Club which, in 1889, was in turn merged into the Hong Kong Corinthian Sailing Club. At the General Meeting of the Hong Kong Corinthian Sailing Club held in October 1893 a resolution was passed that application should be made to the Admiralty for permission to call the Club "The Royal Hong Kong Yacht Club" and to fly the blue ensign with a distinctive mark on the flag. A warrant was granted by the Lords of the Admiralty on 15 May 1894.

Early members were British only with military personnel on the board. Until the 1950s membership was exclusively reserved for Europeans. Women were not allowed to be full members until 1977 when Patricia Loseby became the first female member. Today, membership is open to all.

Unlike other organisations in Hong Kong that had been granted a royal charter, the club retained the "Royal" prefix in its title after the handover to China in 1997, although a majority of its members supported a motion to remove it, this fell two votes short of the 75 percent majority required. A further vote at a later EGM on dropping the Royal title also failed to reach the 75% majority. Subsequently, the commodore at the time successfully proposed that the club adopt a "one country, two systems" principle as to the name, retaining the "Royal" prefix in its English name while dropping the term Wong Ka (皇家; lit. 'Royal') from its Chinese name.

== Facilities ==
The club operates from three sites:

=== Kellett Island (Main Clubhouse) ===
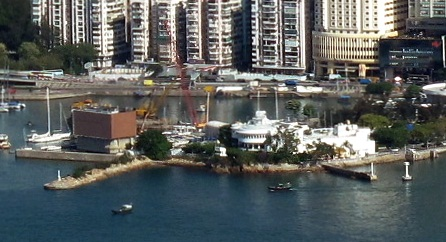
Royal Hong Kong Yacht Club, Kellett Island.

The main buildings of the club are located by Victoria Harbour on the former Kellett Island, now part of Causeway Bay following land reclamation, and forming the western boundary of the Causeway Bay Typhoon Shelter. The club moved there in 1938, and the clubhouse was built in International Modern style in 1939 on the foundations of the old Naval Powder Magazine. It was designed by architects G.G. Wood and J.E. Potter of Leigh & Orange. The new premises were formally opened on 26 October 1940 by the Acting Governor, Lieutenant General E. F. Norton. The building has been listed as a Grade III historic building since 22 January 2010.

=== Middle Island ===
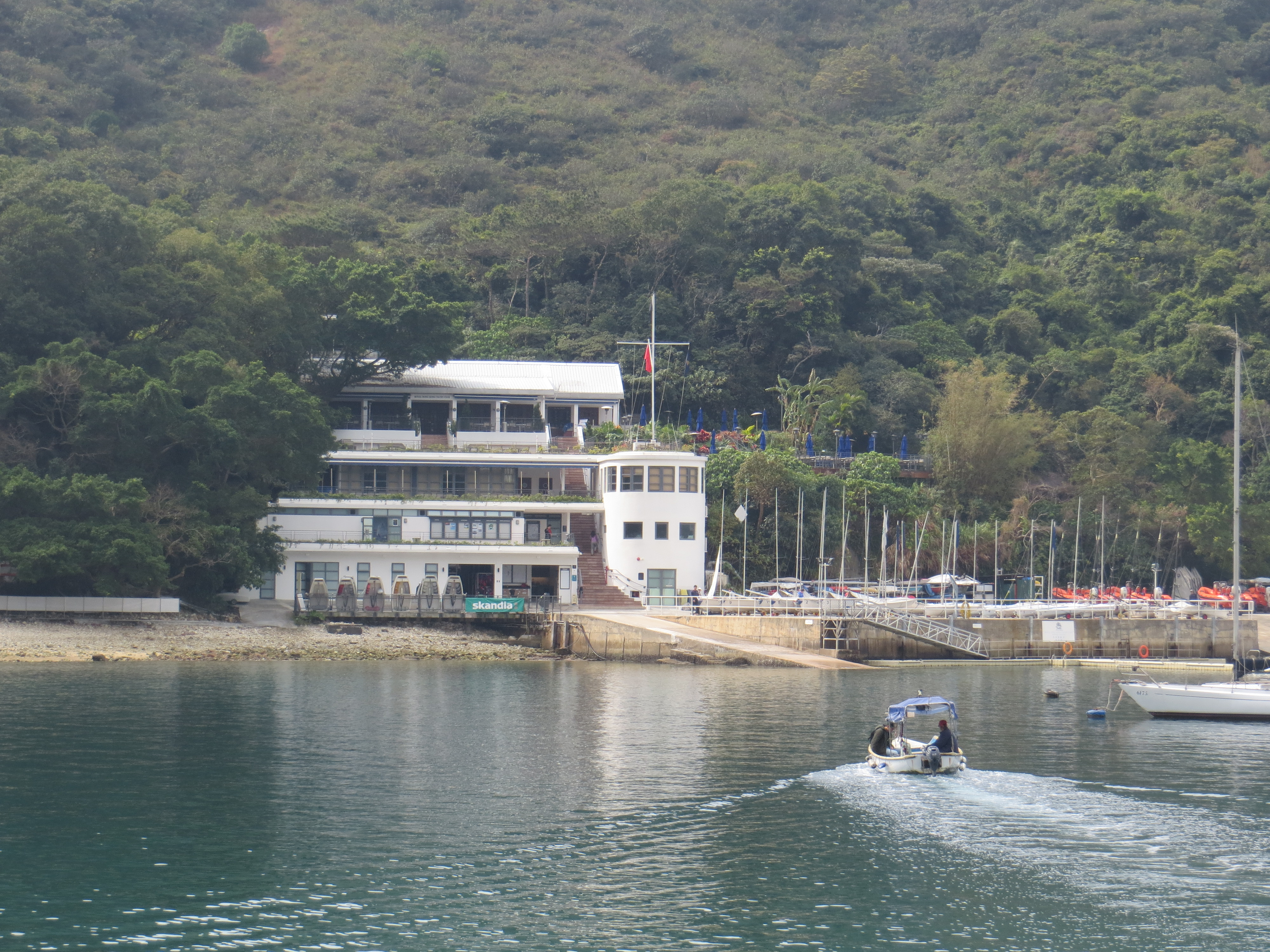
Middle Island facilities.

On Middle Island, accessible only via a club-owned sampan from a footpath from Repulse Bay or Deep Water Bay, or by swimming across the channel.

=== Shelter Cove ===
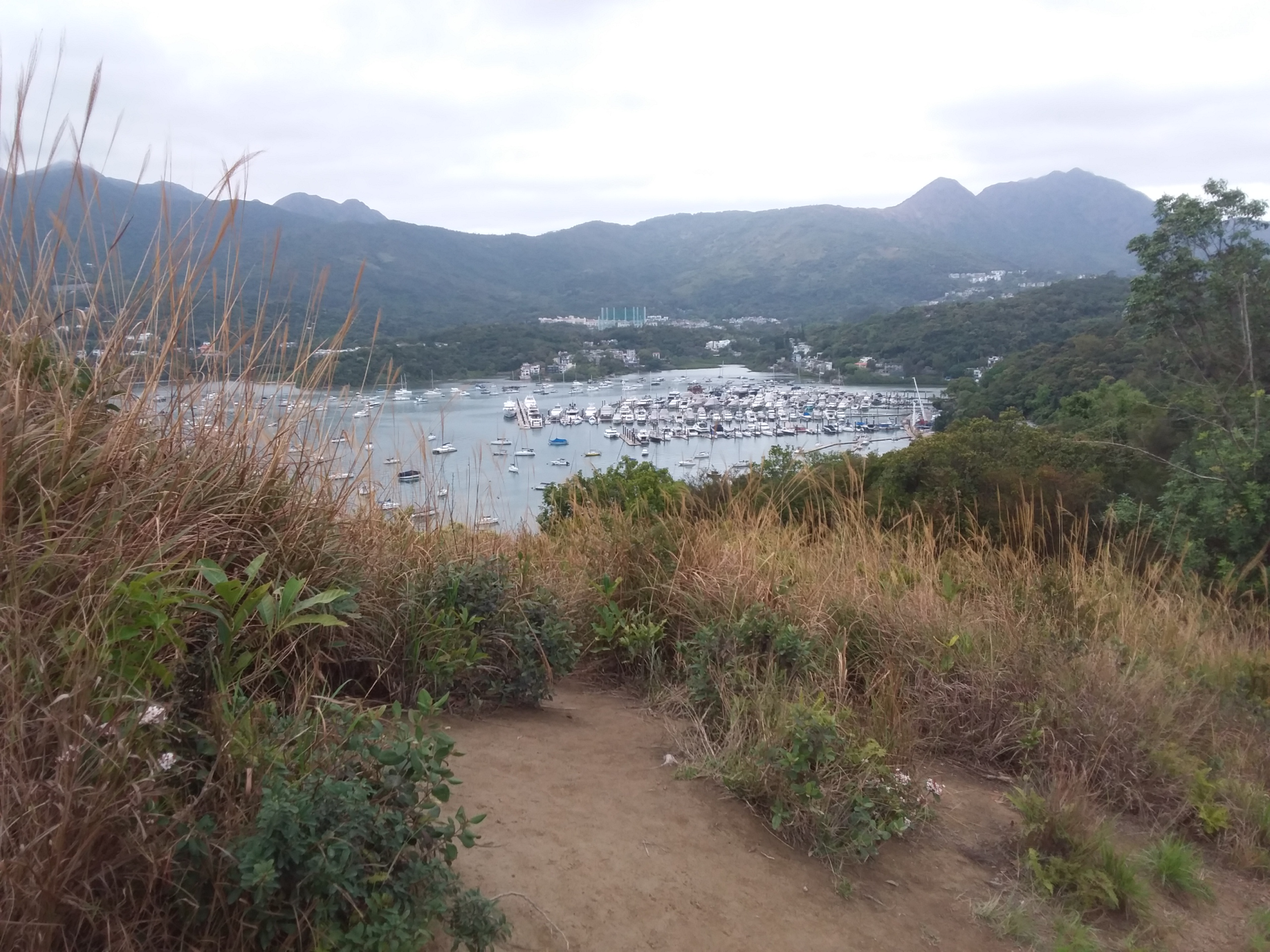
Che Keng Tuk and the Royal Hong Kong Yacht Club Shelter Cove viewed from a hill on Pak Sha Wan Peninsula.

The Shelter Cove, in Hebe Haven, Sai Kung District, accessible by car.

=== Former headquarters in North Point ===
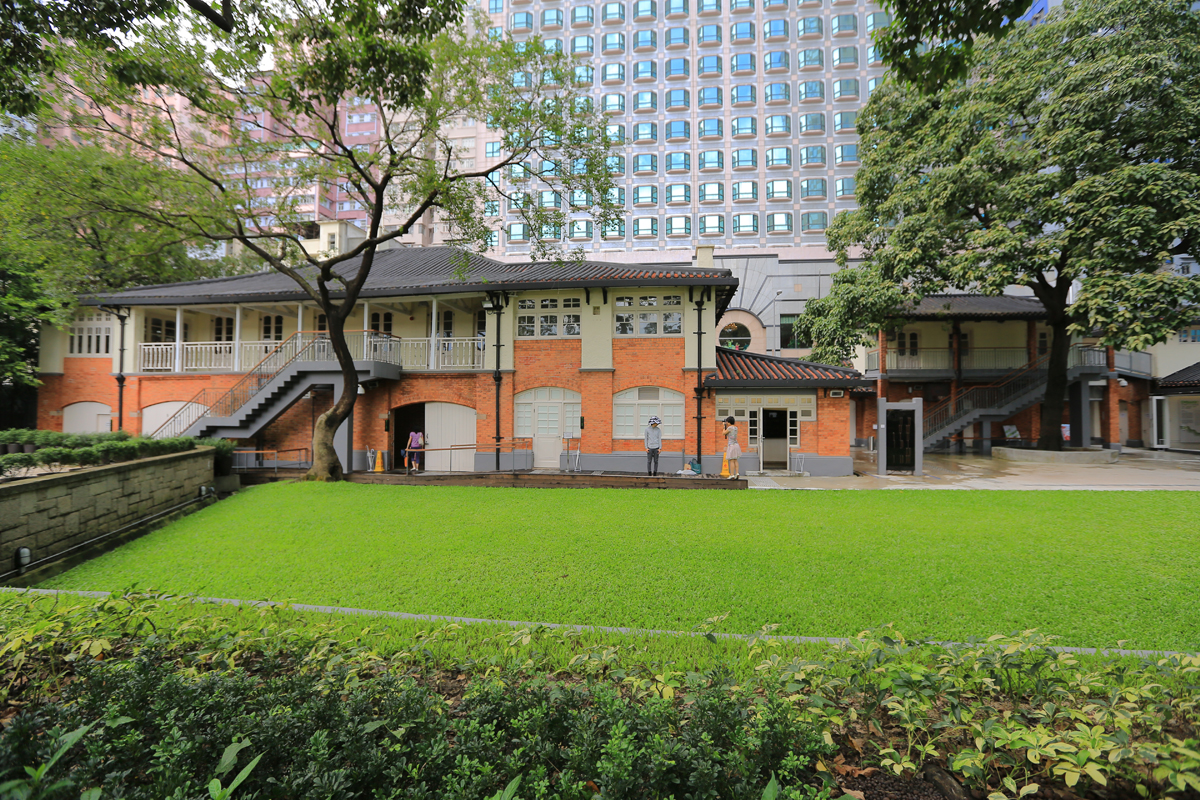
Former headquarters and clubhouse of the Royal Hong Kong Yacht Club, at the corner of Oil Street and Electric Road, Causeway Bay.

For 30 years prior to moving to Kellett Island, the main buildings of the club were located at No. 12 Oil Street, in North Point, then a waterfront location, before reclamation. The former headquarters and clubhouse in Oil Street, built in the Arts and Crafts style, was officially opened on 21 March 1908 by the then Governor, Sir Frederick Lugard. The building was subsequently used as a garage, government staff quarters until 1998, as a storehouse of the Antiquities and Monuments Office until late 2007. The buildings now house the Oi! arts center that aims to promote visual arts in Hong Kong by providing a platform for art exhibitions, forums and other art-related activities. The Former Clubhouse of Royal Hong Kong Yacht Club has been listed as a Grade II historic building since 1995.

== See also ==
- Hebe Haven Yacht Club
- List of International Council of Yacht Clubs members
