= Neil Pryde Ltd. =

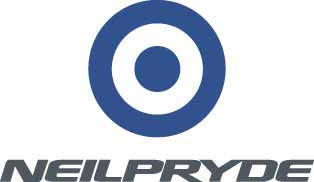
Neil Pryde logotype

Neil Pryde Ltd. (Pryde Group) is a Hong Kong–based sports group engaged in manufacturing, distribution and brand management. It was founded by Neil Pryde, who served as chairman until January 1, 2015.

Pryde Group is a privately held company that is wholly owned by the Shriro Group. It has over 2500 employees and operations in more than 40 countries. It owns a portfolio of brands in the marine and adventure sports markets, including NeilPryde, Cabrinha, JP-Australia, Imagine Surf, and NP Waterwear & Accessories.

== Products ==
Windsurfing gear

One of the products of Neil Pryde is the RS:X, which was the Olympic class of sailboard used by all competitors for the first time at the 2008 Summer Olympics.
