= Canon de 27 C modèle 1864 =

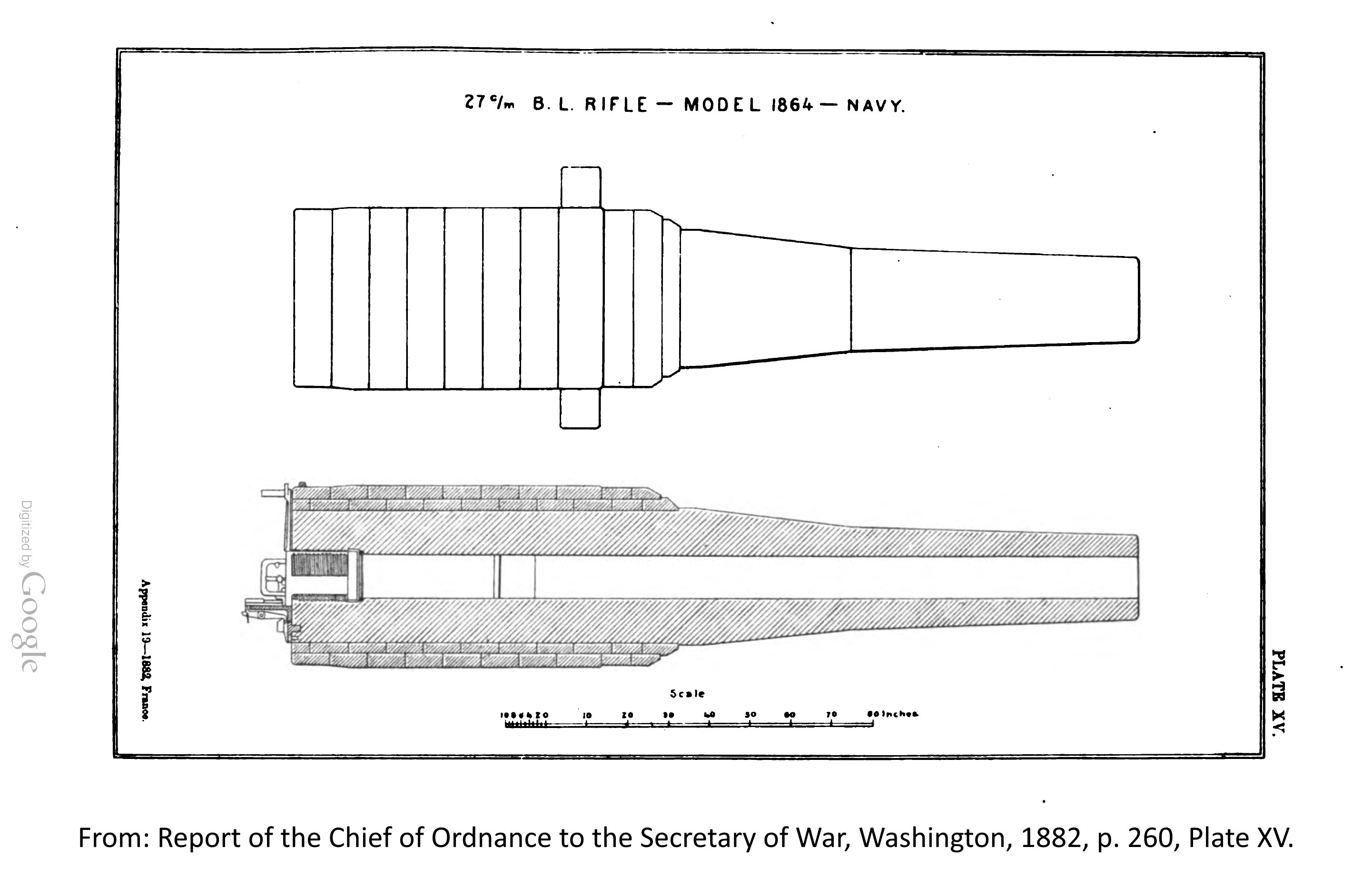
- Canon de 27 cm modèle 1864 cross section
- Type: Naval artillery
- Place of origin: France

Service history
- In service: 1866
- Used by: France
- Wars: Franco-Prussian War (naval)

Production history
- Designed: 1864-1866
- Manufacturer: Ruelle Foundry
- Produced: 1865

Specifications
- Mass: 20,500 kg
- Length: 4.660 m (15.29 ft) L/16.6; 5.212 m (17.10 ft) L/18.9; (M 1864 T. 1870)
- Barrel length: 4.239 m (13.91 ft) L/15.4 (bore)
- Shell: Separate-loading, bagged charge and projectiles
- Caliber: 274.4 mm (10.80 in)
- Breech: screw
- Elevation: c. 8° gun deck carriage; c. 30° coastal carriage
- Muzzle velocity: 354 m/s (1,160 ft/s) regular; 313 m/s (1,030 ft/s) armor-piercing; 470 m/s (1,500 ft/s) T 70 reg.; 475 m/s (1,560 ft/s) T 70 A-P
- Effective firing range: 1200 m cylin. A-P; 2000 m ogive A-P at 6°; 7500 m grenade at 30°

The Canon de 27 C modèle 1864 was a 274 mm cast iron rifled breech loader built-up gun used by the French Navy, as coastal artillery, and also in land warfare.

== Context ==
The French Navy fully transferred to using rifled guns by adopting the family of guns called modèle 1858–1860. This consisted of five rifled muzzle loaders, one rifled muzzle loading shell gun and one rifled 16 cm breech loader. The succeeding series called modèle 1864-1866 brought changes to the hooping, the breech, the weight of the shell, and the weight of the charge.

Another innovation of the modèle 1864 was that the guns were much heavier. The modèle 1858-1860 system had consisted of guns of 14 and 16 cm caliber and (effectively) 17.4 cm caliber. The Modèle 1864 guns were:

- Canon de 14 C modèle 1864
- Canon de 16 C modèle 1864
- Canon de 19 C modèle 1864
- Canon de 24 C modèle 1864
- 'our' Canon de 27 C modèle 1864

== Development ==
=== Design ===
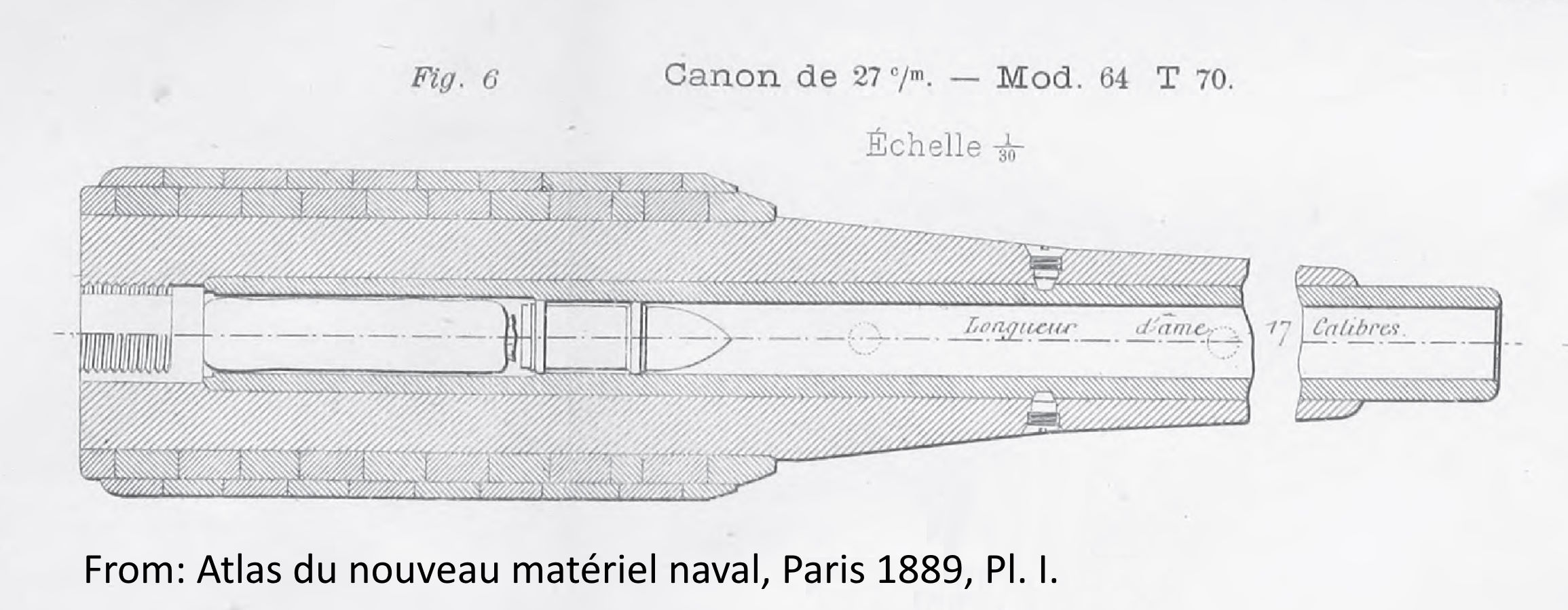
27 cm M 1864 T 1870

The 27 cm modèle 1864 held a special position in the modèle 1864 family of guns. Contrary to the lighter calibers, it was originally meant to be used only as a coastal gun. The first designs of the gun date from 21 December 1864. Changes were made every year right up to 21 December 1868.

The first design for the rifling dates from August 1866. It therefore seems likely that the gun came into service after August 1866. In February 1869 a decision was made about the changes to be applied to all guns that dated from before 21 December 1868. The price for a gun was 18,450 Francs.

=== 27 cm M 1864 T 1870 ===
The 27 cm modèle 1864 transformé au modèle 1870 was a heavily modified version of the gun. It was made by first removing the frettes (rings) and then boring out the gun and inserting a steel inner tube inside the cast iron barrel. With the 27 cm gun, this inner tube stuck out for 552 mm, effectively lengthening the gun to give it the same relative length (L/19) as the lighter 19 and 24 cm models.

At the same time, the length and diameter of the powder chamber of the 27 cm gun were increased. This allowed a higher charge of gunpowder that burned slower. The increased length of the barrel was used to 'consume' this increased charge. The new inner tube was made to use the same ammunition as the Model 1870 guns. The breech and obturator were also changed.

== Characteristics ==
=== The barrel ===
The total length of the barrel of the 27 cm gun was 4,660 mm. This was 10 cm longer than the 24 cm gun. In calibers it was L/16.6, which was a step down compared to the length of the 16, 19, and 24 cm guns, which were all about L/19. The total weight of the gun was 20,500 kg including the breech.

The hooping of the gun was called frettage. It was similar to the system that Krupp applied later on. It consisted of puddle steel rings that were shrunk over the barrel, putting pressure on it to make it more resistant. The first system of ringing consisted of a first layer of 12 rings, of which ten were 185 mm long. The second layer also had ten rings. This system was applied to a number of guns.

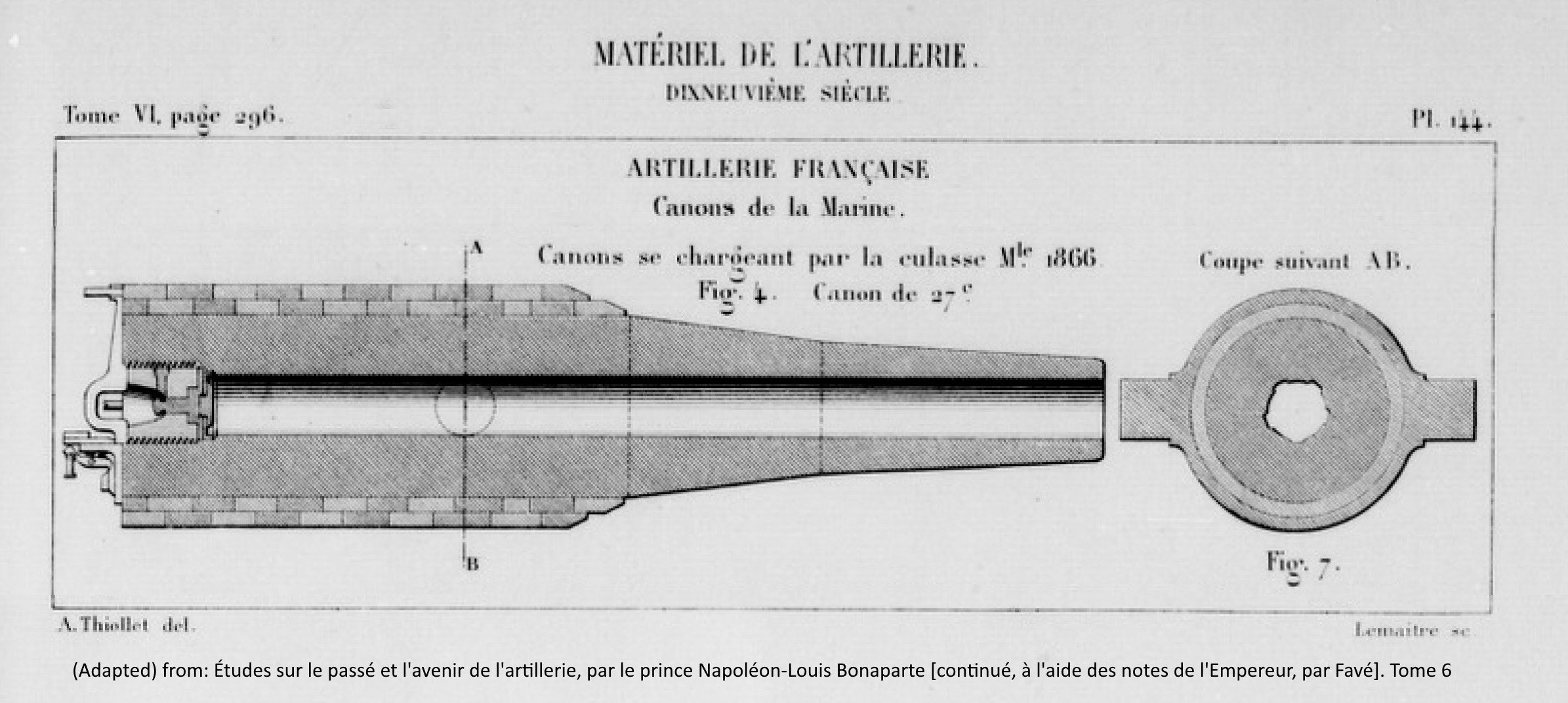
Canon de 27 C model 1866 of the April 1868 construction

After some more changes, a new system was prescribed on 2 April 1868. This again had twelve frettes in the first layer. The first was 236 mm long. The third and the last (near the breech), were 117 mm long. All the others were 213 mm long. In the second layer, there were ten rings. The first ring was 228 mm long, the third 274 mm, and the last 216 mm. This is inline with a cross section of the gun published in 1871.

The length of bore of the barrel was 4,239 mm. The rifled part of the barrel was 3,449 mm long. Behind it was a transitional cone of 10 mm which connected to the chamber. The chamber was 739 mm long and had a diameter of 286.8 mm. The vent of the cannon entered the chamber 610 mm from the rear of the gun. Behind the chamber were the two obturators, and behind those, the place for the breech, which was 326 mm long.

The rifling consisted of five grooves. At the muzzle, these were 60 mm wide and had a maximum depth of 5 mm. Groove No 1 differed from the others and connected to a channel (rigole) in the chamber that guided the projectile to its proper position.

The 27 cm modèle 1864 transformé au modèle 1870 had the same inner configuration as the Canon de 27 C modèle 1870. This meant more grooves, different obturator, ignition through the breech etc. It was also longer than the original gun.

=== Projectiles ===
The 27 cm M 1864 gun fired a regular grenade called Obus oblong en fonte. It weighed 144 kg and carried an explosive charge weighing 7.625 kg. This was ignited by a percussion fuze.

There was also a grenade of chilled cast iron called obus oblong en fonte dure. Fully charged, this weighed 216 kg. It carried an internal explosive charge of 2.5 kg, which was ignited by the heat of the impact.

The ogive steel shot called boulet ogival en acier weighed 216 kg. It did not carry an internal explosive charge. There was also a boulet ogival en fonte, which was a bit a longer, so it attained the same weight. It was meant for exercise only. There was also boulet ogival en fonte dure which was the almost the same as the exercise shot, but was obviously meant to be used in combat.

There were also two cylindrical shot, which had a blunt head. The boulet cylindrique en acier was meant for combat at the closest distances. The boulet ogival en fonte was the exercise equivalent. Both weighed 216 kg. The last shot were two canister shot.

The 27 cm modèle 1864 transformé au modèle 1870 used the same projectiles as the Canon de 27 C modèle 1870.

=== Performance ===
The regular grenade of 144 kg was fired with a standard charge of 24 kg. This gave the projectile a velocity of 354 m/s. At an elevation of e.g. 8°, this gave the gun a range of about 3 km. On a coastal carriage that could elevate to 30°, this was about 7.5 km.

The solid ogive and cylindrical shot of 216 kg were fired with a charge of 30 kg. The velocity of the cylindrical shot was 313 m/s. The ballistic tables gave the ogive shot an effective range of 2,000 m, and the cylindrical shot an effective range of 1,200 m.

When the frettage or ringing of the gun was strengthened (above), a charge of 36 kg could be used for firing the solid shot.

The charges for the 24 cm model 1864 T 1870 gun were 50 kg of powder for the grenade and 55 kg for the solid steel shot. The regular grenade then got a velocity of 470 m/s and the steel shot a velocity of 475 m/s.

=== Naval carriages ===
In spite of the gun not being meant for service on board, a carriage for use on a covered gun deck was designed in November 1867. It was called model 1867 and was followed by model 1867-1872 and model 1872-1876, which were both quite similar. They were called affût de batterie à châssis. This meant that they consisted of an upper carriage that resembled a traditional naval carriage, but which slid over a frame (chassis) instead of recoiling over the deck. The frame called slide had little rollers that could move it sideways, allowing the gun to be aimed horizontally.

The battery carriages for the 27 cm gun were by themselves big machines. They measured 6.12 by 2.25 m and were 1.30 m high. The carriage put the trunnions of the gun 0.98 m above the ground. On the battery carriage, the gun could elevate to 8° and incline to 7°. The gun could recoil over the slide for 2.20 m. The upper carriage weighed 4,500 kg and the slide weighed 6,000 kg. The total price of the carriage was 21,000 francs. Which was more than that for the gun.

The big difference between the battery carriage and the semi-turret carriage for use on the upper deck, was that the latter put the trunnions 2.05 m above the ground, allowing an elevation of 32.3° and thus much longer range. There are no indications that the model 1864 gun used this carriage.

Only ten modèle 1867 carriages were made. These were soon relegated to storage. Of the model 1867-1872, 25 carriages were made. Some of these were used for Friedland and Colbert. However, these ships used model 1870 guns.

=== Coastal carriages ===
The coastal carriage affût de côte model 1870 was also a carriage consisting of a more or less traditional upper carriage that slid over a frame (châssis), known as the slide. The upper carriage was made of wood, the slide was of iron. In front, the slide was attached to a pivot. It could then be moved sideways while it rolled on four little wheels that fit into a rails (circulaire). This rails and the pivot were set in a concrete platform. The affût de côte à pivot à l'avant model 1876 for the 27 cm guns model 1864 and 1870 was a bit bigger than the previous model.

The dimensions of the 1870 model carriage were: 6.25 m length, 2.45 m wide and 3.00 m high. For the 1876 model this was 7.00, 2.75, and 3.40 m. Maxium recoil was 2.79 and 2.67 m. With the 1870 model, the gun could elevate to 22° and decline to 7°, for the 1876 model this was 30° and 6°. The model 1870 carriage weighed 28,600 kg and cost 22,650 francs.

The casemate carriage affût de casemate model 1870 was meant to fire through an embrasure that was 0.80 m wide and at least 1.40 m high. This allowed an arc of fire of 30°, elevation to 9° and declination to 3°.

== Use ==
=== On ships ===
The ironclad Océan had four 27 cm guns in its armored citadel and four Canon de 24 C modèle 1864 above it in semi-turrets. Océan's sister ships Marengo and Suffren were said to have the same armament.

The four 27 cm guns on board Rochambeau were said to be 27 cm model 1864. This can also be derived from a May 1868 news item that described her guns in a way that fit the 27 cm model 1864-1866 guns. The date of the news itself is also in line with the conclusion that these were indeed model 1864-1866 guns.

The 27 cm guns on Friedland and Colbert were model 1870 guns.

=== As coastal gun ===
One of the known uses of the gun as a coastal gun was in Martinique. In May 1891, four platforms for 27 cm modèle 1864-1866 guns were tested at Fort Saint Louis in Martinique. The 27 cm guns fired 20 shots. At the same time, six canon de 19 C modèle 1870 were tested.
