= French ship Trident =

Several ships of the French Navy have borne the name Trident, after the Trident, often associated with the Roman God of the Sea, Neptune:

- Trident (1666), renamed Mercoeur and condemned in 1697.
- Trident (1671), condemned in 1686.
- Trident (1688), captured by HMS Plymouth in 1695 and taken in service as HMS Trydent. Later renamed Trident Prize, she was sunk as a breakwater in 1702 at Harwich.
- Trident (1695), broken up in 1720.
- Trident (1742), captured in 1747 during the Second battle of Cape Finisterre and taken into service as HMS Trydent. Sold in 1763.
- Trident (1811), condemned in 1857.
- Trident (1876), an ironclad launched in 1876.
