= Ocean class =

Ocean class may refer to:

- Ocean ship, a class of cargo ships used by the British Ministry of War Transport in WWII
- Océan-class ironclad, used by the French Navy
- Océan-class ship of the line, used by the French Navy
- Ocean class, a type of survey vessel used by the Russian Hydrographic Service
