= French ironclad Trident =

French Colbert-class ironclad

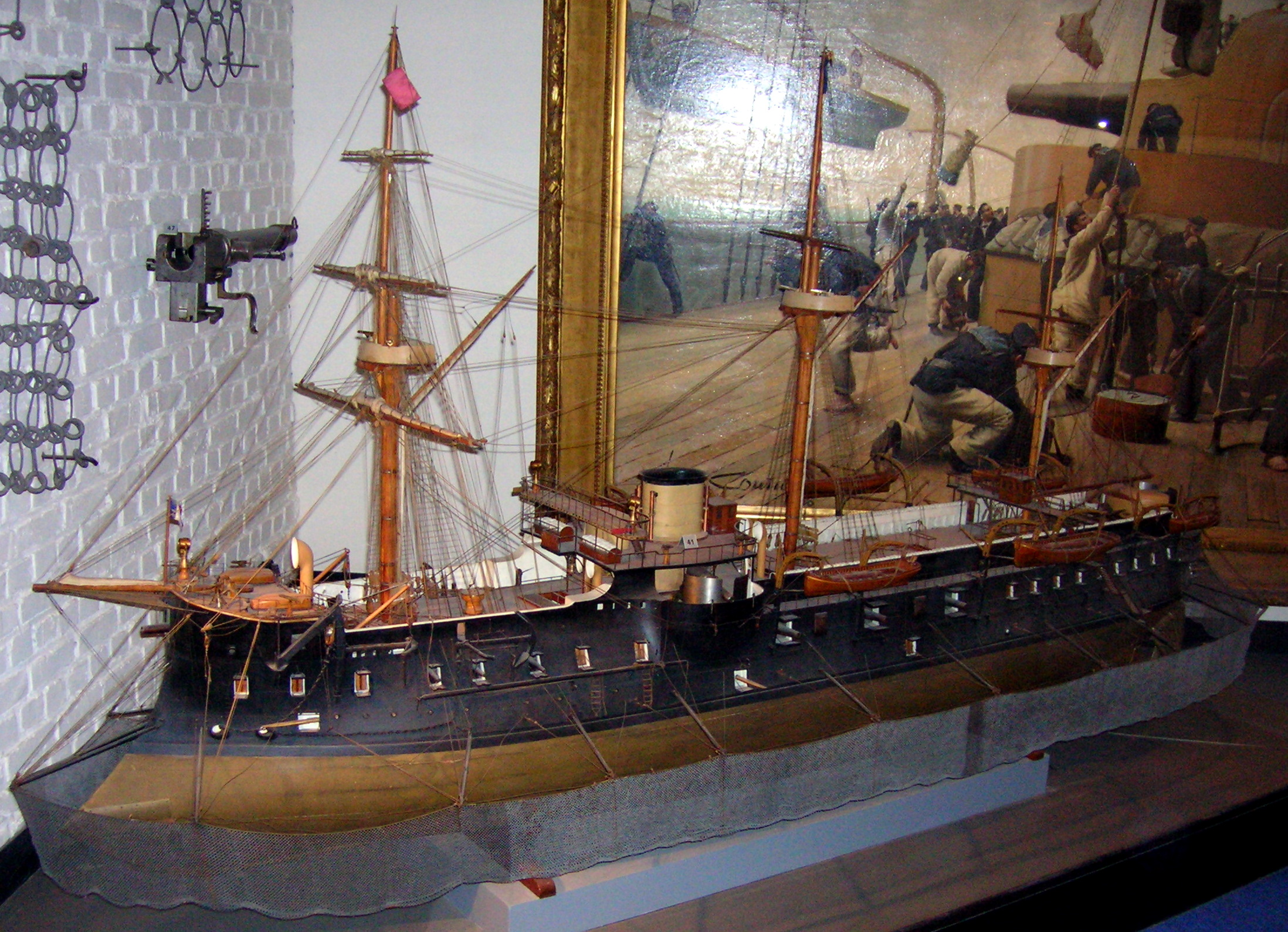
- A model of Trident in the Musée national de la Marine, Paris, with her torpedo net deployed

History

France
- Name: Trident
- Namesake: Trident
- Builder: Arsenal de Toulon
- Laid down: April 1870
- Launched: 9 November 1876
- Completed: 1 November 1878
- Renamed: Var, 1904
- Stricken: Condemned, 5 April 1900
- Fate: Sold for scrap, 1909

General characteristics
- Class & type: Colbert-class ironclad
- Displacement: 8,814 metric tons (8,675 long tons)
- Length: 102.1 m (335 ft 0 in)
- Beam: 17.7 m (58 ft 1 in)
- Draft: 8.58 m (28.1 ft)
- Installed power: 4,600 ihp (3,400 kW); 8 oval boilers
- Propulsion: 1 shaft, 1 Horizontal return connecting rod-steam engine
- Sail plan: Ship rigged
- Speed: 14 knots (26 km/h; 16 mph)
- Range: approximately 3,300 nmi (6,100 km; 3,800 mi) at 10 knots (19 km/h; 12 mph)
- Complement: 774
- Armament: 8 × single 274 mm (10.8 in) guns; 1 × single 240 mm (9.4 in) guns; 6 × single 138 mm (5.4 in) guns; 4 × 356 mm (14.0 in) torpedo tubes
- Armor: Belt: 180–220 mm (7.1–8.7 in); Battery: 160 mm (6.3 in); Deck: 150 mm (5.9 in); Bulkheads: 120 mm (4.7 in)

The French ironclad Trident was the second and last ship of the Colbert-class ironclads that were built for the French Navy in the 1870s. The ship was the flagship of the deputy commander of the Mediterranean Squadron for most of her career. She took part in the French occupation of Tunisia, notably shelling and landing troops in Sfax in 1881. Trident was reclassified as a training ship in 1894 and condemned in 1900, before she was finally sold for scrap in 1909.

== Design and description ==
The Colbert-class ships were designed by Constructor Sabattier as improved versions of the ironclad Richelieu. As a central battery ironclad, Trident had her armament concentrated amidships. Like most ironclads of her era she was equipped with a plough-shaped ram. Her crew numbered 774 officers and men. The metacentric height of the ship was low, a little above 0.6 meters (2 ft).

The ship measured 102.1 meters (335 ft 0 in) overall, with a beam of 17.7 meters (58 ft 1 in). Trident had a maximum draft of 8.58 meters (28 ft 2 in) and displaced 8,814 metric tons (8,675 long tons).

=== Propulsion ===
Trident had a single Wolf three-cylinder horizontal return connecting-rod compound steam engine that drove one propeller. The engine was powered by eight oval boilers and was designed for a capacity of 4,600 indicated horsepower (3,400 kW). On sea trials, the engine produced 4,882 metric horsepower (3,591 kW) and Trident reached 14.18 knots (26.26 km/h; 16.32 mph). She carried a maximum of 620 metric tons (610 long tons) of coal which allowed her to steam for approximately 3,300 nautical miles (6,100 km; 3,800 mi) at a speed of 10 knots (19 km/h; 12 mph). Trident was ship rigged with three masts and had a sail area around 2,100 square meters (23,000 sq ft).

=== Armament ===
Trident had two 274-millimeter (10.8 in) guns mounted in barbettes on the upper deck, one gun at the forward corners of the battery, with six additional guns on the battery deck below the barbettes. The side of the upper deck were cut away to improve the ability of the barbette guns to bear fore and aft. One 240-millimeter (9.4 in) was mounted in the forecastle as a chase gun. The ship's secondary armament consisted of six 138-millimeter (5.4 in) guns, four forward of the battery and two aft. These latter two guns were replaced in 1878 by another 240-millimeter gun as a stern chaser. The ship also mounted four above-water 356-millimeter (14.0 in) torpedo tubes.

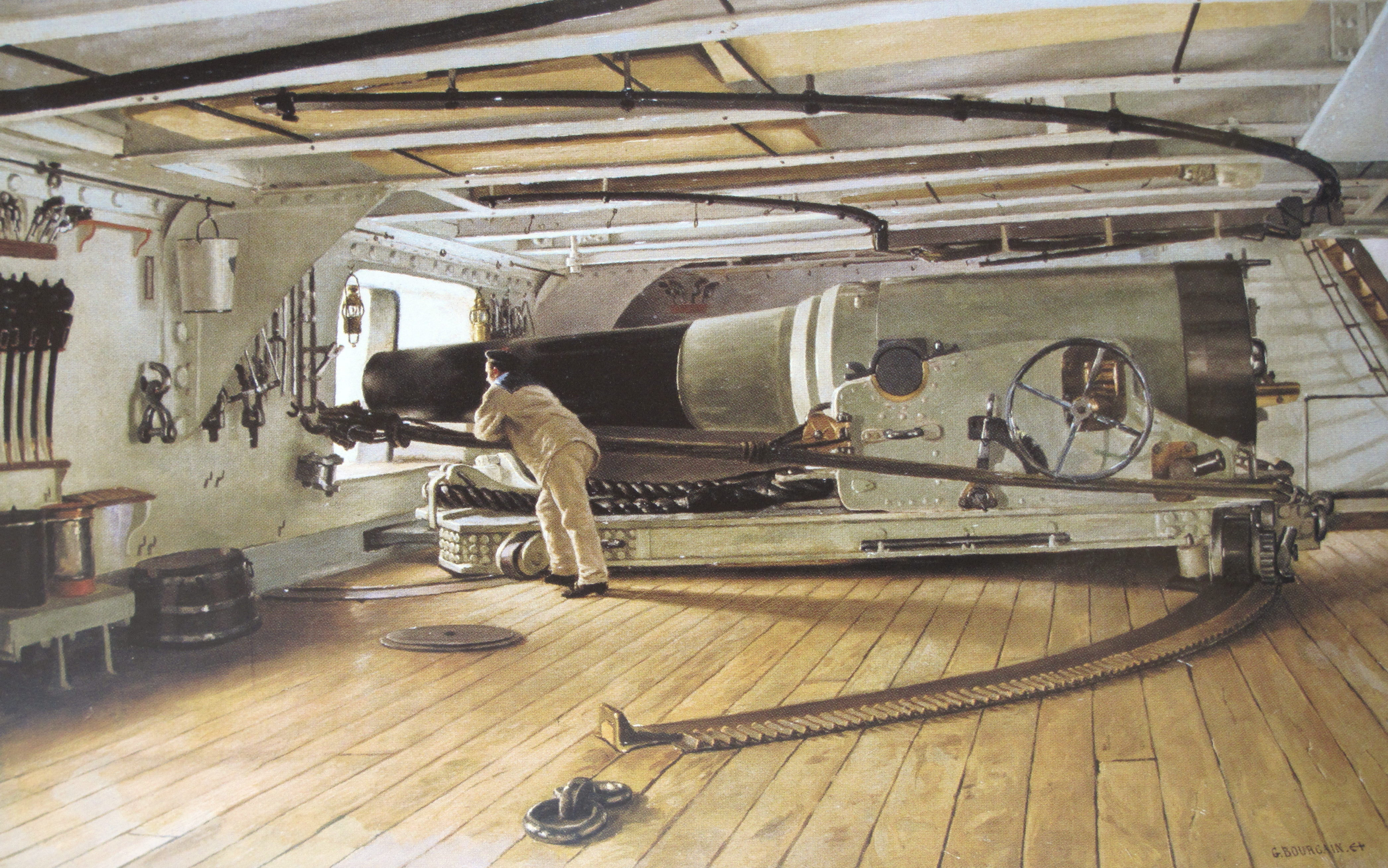
Canon de 27 cm modèle 1870 in the armoured section of a Colbert class ironclad, by Gustave Bourgain, circa 1885.

All of the ship's guns could fire both solid shot and explosive shells. The 274-millimeter Modèle 1870 gun was credited with the ability to penetrate a maximum 14.3 inches (360 mm) of wrought iron armor while the 240-millmeter Modèle 1870 gun could penetrate 14.4 inches (366 mm) of wrought iron armor.

At some point the ship received fourteen to eighteen 37-millimeter (1.5 in) Hotchkiss 5-barrel revolving guns. They fired a shell weighing about 500 g (1.1 lb) to a range of about 3,200 meters (3,500 yd). They had a rate of fire of about 30 rounds per minute.

=== Armor ===
The Colbert-class ships had a complete wrought iron waterline belt that was 220 millimeters (8.7 in) thick amidships and tapered to 180 millimeters (7.1 in) at the stern. It was backed by 89 millimeters (3.5 in) of wood. The sides of the battery itself were armored with 160 millimeters (6.3 in) of wrought iron, backed by 62 millimeters (2.4 in) of wood, and the ends of the battery were closed by transverse armored bulkheads 120 millimeters (4.7 in) thick, backed by 480 millimeters (18.9 in) of wood. The barbettes were unarmored, but the deck was 15 millimeters (0.59 in) thick.

== Service ==
Trident, named after the weapon that symbolized mastery of the seas, was laid down in April 1870 in Toulon and launched on 9 November 1876. While the exact reason for such prolonged construction time is not known, it is believed that reduction of the French Navy's budget after the Franco-Prussian War of 1870–71 and out-of-date work practices in French dockyards were likely causes. The ship was completed on 1 November 1878 and became the flagship of the second-in-command of the Mediterranean Squadron the following month. Trident, together with her sister ship Colbert, bombarded the Tunisian port of Sfax on 15–16 July 1881 as the French occupied Tunisia. She was disarmed and placed in reserve in 1886–89, but was recommissioned on 17 February 1889 and resumed her role as flagship until she was again placed in reserve in 1894. The ship served as a gunnery training ship until she was condemned on 5 March 1900. Trident was renamed Var in 1904 and was sold for scrap five years later.
