= Colbert-class ironclad =

French Navy's Colbert-class ironclad

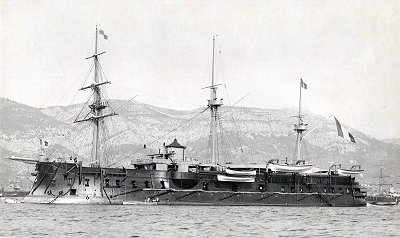
- Colbert at anchor

Class overview
- Name: Colbert
- Operators: French Navy
- Preceded by: Richelieu
- Succeeded by: Redoutable
- Built: 1870–78
- In service: 1877–1900
- In commission: 1877–95
- Completed: 2
- Scrapped: 2

General characteristics
- Type: Central-battery ironclad
- Displacement: 8,614–8,814 metric tons (8,478–8,675 long tons)
- Length: 101.1–102.1 m (331 ft 8 in – 335 ft 0 in) (o/a)
- Beam: 17.57–17.7 m (57 ft 8 in – 58 ft 1 in)
- Draft: 8.11–8.58 m (26.6–28.1 ft)
- Installed power: 4,700 PS; 3,400 kW (4,600 ihp); 8 oval boilers
- Propulsion: 1 shaft, 1 Horizontal return connecting-rod steam engine
- Sail plan: Ship rigged
- Speed: 14 knots (26 km/h; 16 mph)
- Range: 3,300 nautical miles (6,100 km; 3,800 mi) at 10 knots (19 km/h; 12 mph)
- Complement: 750
- Armament: 2 × single 274 mm (10.8 in) guns; 1 × single 240 mm (9.4 in) guns; 6 × single 138 mm (5.4 in) guns; 4 × 356-millimeter (14.0 in) torpedo tubes
- Armor: Belt: 180–220 mm (7.1–8.7 in); Battery: 160 mm (6.3 in); Bulkheads: 120 mm (4.7 in); Deck: 15 mm (0.6 in)

The Colbert class were a pair of armored frigates built for the French Navy during the 1870s. The ships served as the flagships of the commander and deputy commander of the Mediterranean Squadron for most of their careers. The sister ships took part in the French conquest of Tunisia, notably shelling and landing troops in Sfax in 1881. They were relegated to second-line roles in 1894–95 before being condemned in 1900. The ships were finally sold for scrap in 1909.

== Design and description ==
The Colbert-class ships were designed by Constructor Sabattier as improved versions of the ironclad Richelieu and were the last ships authorized by the 1857 Naval Program. They reverted to a single propeller shaft to improve their sailing qualities and to lessen the chance of the propellers being fouled by fallen rigging. As central battery ironclads, they had their armament concentrated amidships. Like most ironclads of their era, they were equipped with a plough-shaped ram. The ships' crew numbered 774 officers and men. Their metacentric height was low, a little above 0.6 meters (2 ft).

The ships measured 101.1–102.1 meters (331 ft 8 in – 335 ft 0 in) overall, with a beam of 17.57–17.7 meters (57 ft 8 in – 58 ft 1 in). They had maximum drafts of 8.11–8.58 meters (26 ft 7 in – 28 ft 2 in) and displaced 8,617–8,814 metric tons (8,481–8,675 long tons).

While the exact reason for such prolonged construction time is not known, it is believed that reduction of the French Navy's budget after the Franco-Prussian War of 1870–71 and out-of-date work practices in French dockyards were likely causes.

=== Propulsion ===
The Colbert class had a single Wolf three-cylinder horizontal return connecting-rod compound steam engine that drove one propeller. The engine was powered by eight oval boilers and was designed for a capacity of 4,700 metric horsepower; 3,400 kilowatts (4,600 ihp). On sea trials the engines produced 4,652–4,882 metric horsepower (3,422–3,591 kW) and the ships reached speeds of 14.18–14.47 knots (26.26–26.80 km/h; 16.32–16.65 mph). The ships carried a maximum of 620 metric tons (610 long tons) of coal which allowed them to steam for approximately 3,300 nautical miles (6,100 km; 3,800 mi) at a speed of 10 knots (19 km/h; 12 mph). They were ship rigged with three masts and had a sail area around 2,100 square meters (23,000 sq ft).

=== Armament ===
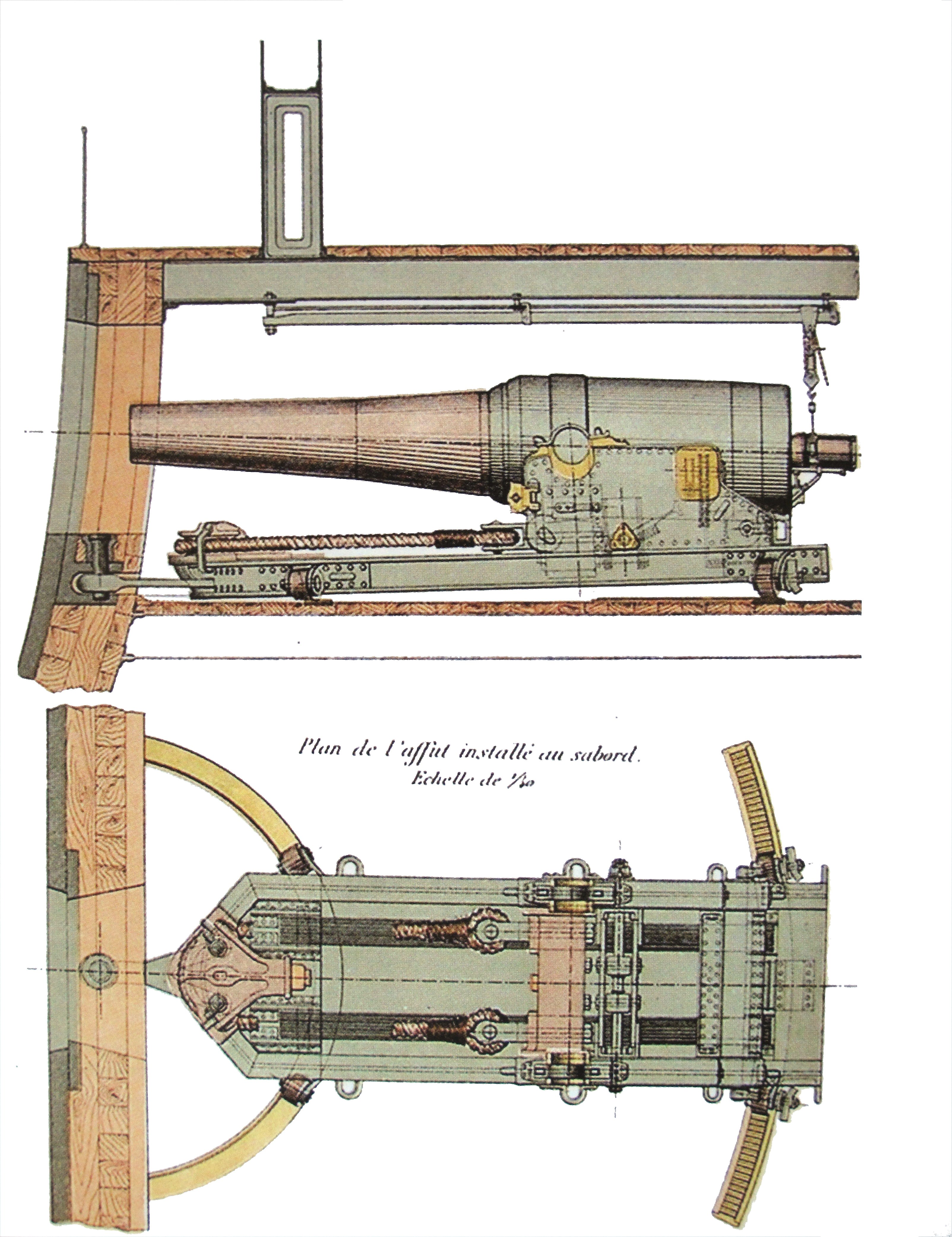
Mounting of the Canon de 27 cm modèle 1870.

The Colberts had two 274-millimeter (10.8 in) guns mounted in barbettes on the upper deck, one gun at the forward corners of the battery, with six additional guns on the battery deck below the barbettes. The side of the upper deck were cut away to improve the ability of the barbette guns to bear fore and aft. One 240-millimeter (9.4 in) gun was mounted in the forecastle as a chase gun. The ship's secondary armament consisted of six 138-millimeter (5.4 in) guns, four forward of the battery and two aft. These latter two guns were replaced in 1878 by another 240-millimeter gun as a stern chaser. The ship also mounted four above-water 356-millimeter (14.0 in) torpedo tubes.

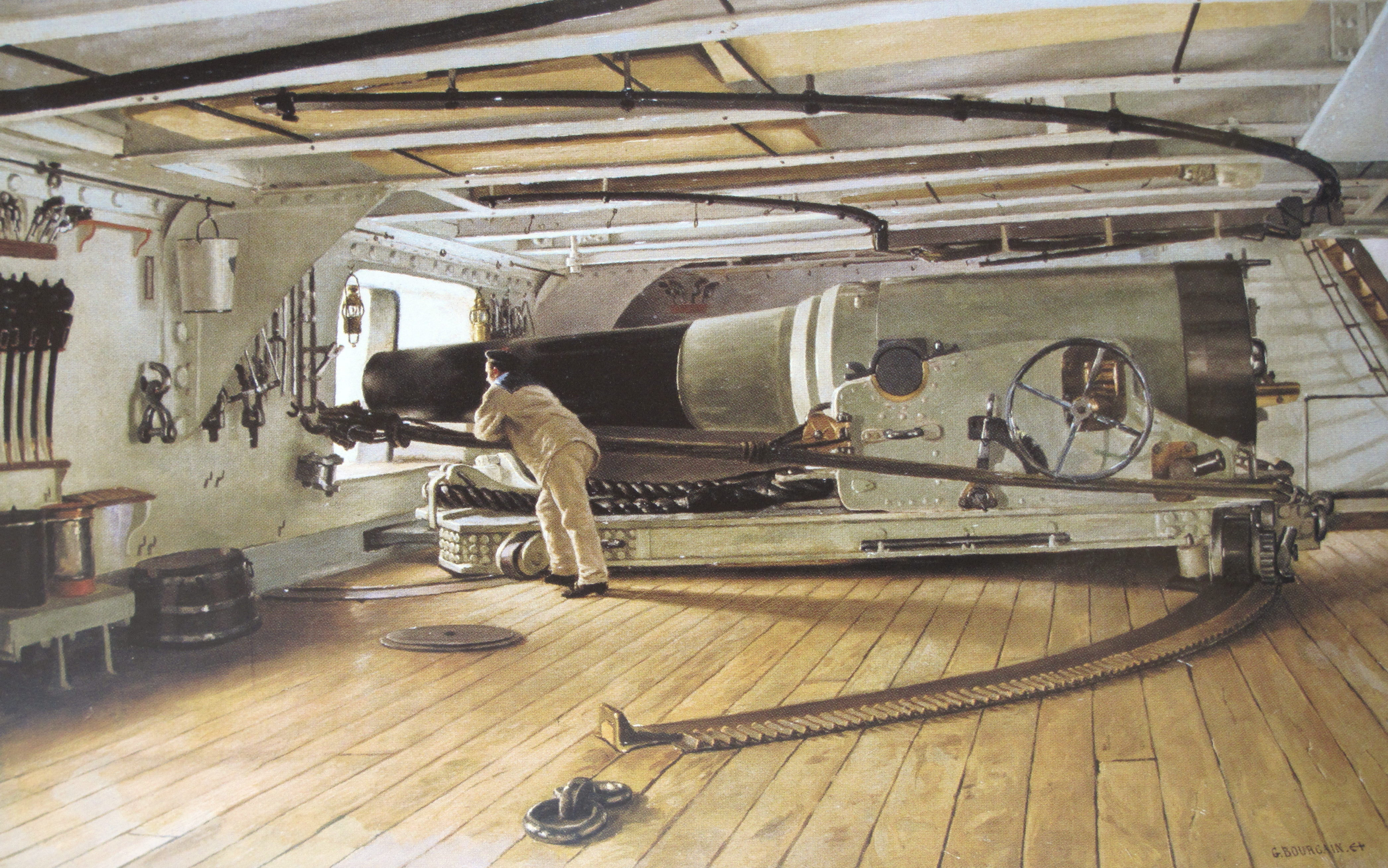
Canon de 27 cm modèle 1870 in the armoured section of a Colbert class ironclad, by Gustave Bourgain, circa 1885.

All of the guns could fire both solid shot and explosive shells. The 18-caliber 274-millimeter Modèle 1870 gun fired an armor-piercing, 216.0-kilogram (476.2 lb) shell while the gun itself weighed 23.21 metric tons (22.84 long tons). The gun fired its shell at a muzzle velocity of 434 m/s (1,424 ft/s) and was credited with the ability to penetrate 360 millimeters (14.3 in) of wrought iron armor at the muzzle. The armor-piercing shell of the 19-caliber 240-millmeter Modèle 1870 gun weighed 144.0 kilograms (317.5 lb) while the gun itself weighed 15.66 metric tons (15.41 long tons). It had a muzzle velocity of 495 m/s (1,624 ft/s) and could penetrate 366 millimeters (14.4 in) of wrought iron armor at the muzzle. The 138-millimeter gun was 21 calibers long and weighed 2.67 metric tons (2.63 long tons). It fired a 28.0-kilogram (61.7 lb) explosive shell that had a muzzle velocity of 466 m/s (1,529 ft/s).

At some point the ship received fourteen to eighteen 37-millimeter (1.5 in) Hotchkiss 5-barrel revolving guns. They fired a shell weighing about 500 g (1.1 lb) at a muzzle velocity of about 610 m/s (2,000 ft/s) to a range of about 3,200 meters (3,500 yd) and had a rate of fire of about 30 rounds per minute.

=== Armor ===
The Colbert-class ships had a complete wrought iron waterline belt that was 220 millimeters (8.7 in) thick amidships and tapered to 180 millimeters (7.1 in) at the stern. It was backed by 89 millimeters (3.5 in) of wood. The sides of the battery itself were armored with 160 millimeters (6.3 in) of wrought iron, backed by 62 millimeters (2.4 in) of wood, and the ends of the battery were closed by transverse armored bulkheads 120 millimeters (4.7 in) thick, backed by 480 millimeters (18.9 in) of wood. The barbettes were unarmored, but the deck was 15 millimeters (0.59 in) thick.

== Ships ==
Ship	Builder	Laid down	Launched	Completed
Colbert	Arsenal de Brest, Brest	4 July 1870	16 September 1875	30 June 1877
Trident	Arsenal de Toulon, Toulon	April 1870	9 November 1876	18 November 1878

== Service ==
Colbert served as the flagship of the Mediterranean Squadron from 1879 to 1890 when she was placed in reserve. Trident became the flagship of the second-in-command of the squadron in 1879. The sisters bombarded the port of Sfax on 15–16 July 1881 as the French occupied Tunisia, under the command of Vice Admiral Henri Garnault.

Colbert was recommissioned in 1892 before she was disarmed and paid off in 1895. Trident was disarmed and placed in reserve in 1886–89, but was recommissioned in 1889 and resumed her role as flagship until she was again placed in reserve in 1894. The ship served as a gunnery training ship until she was condemned in 1900. She was renamed Var in 1904 and was sold for scrap five years later. Colbert was also condemned in 1900 and sold for scrap in 1909.
