= French ironclad Marengo =

French Navy's Océan-class ironclad

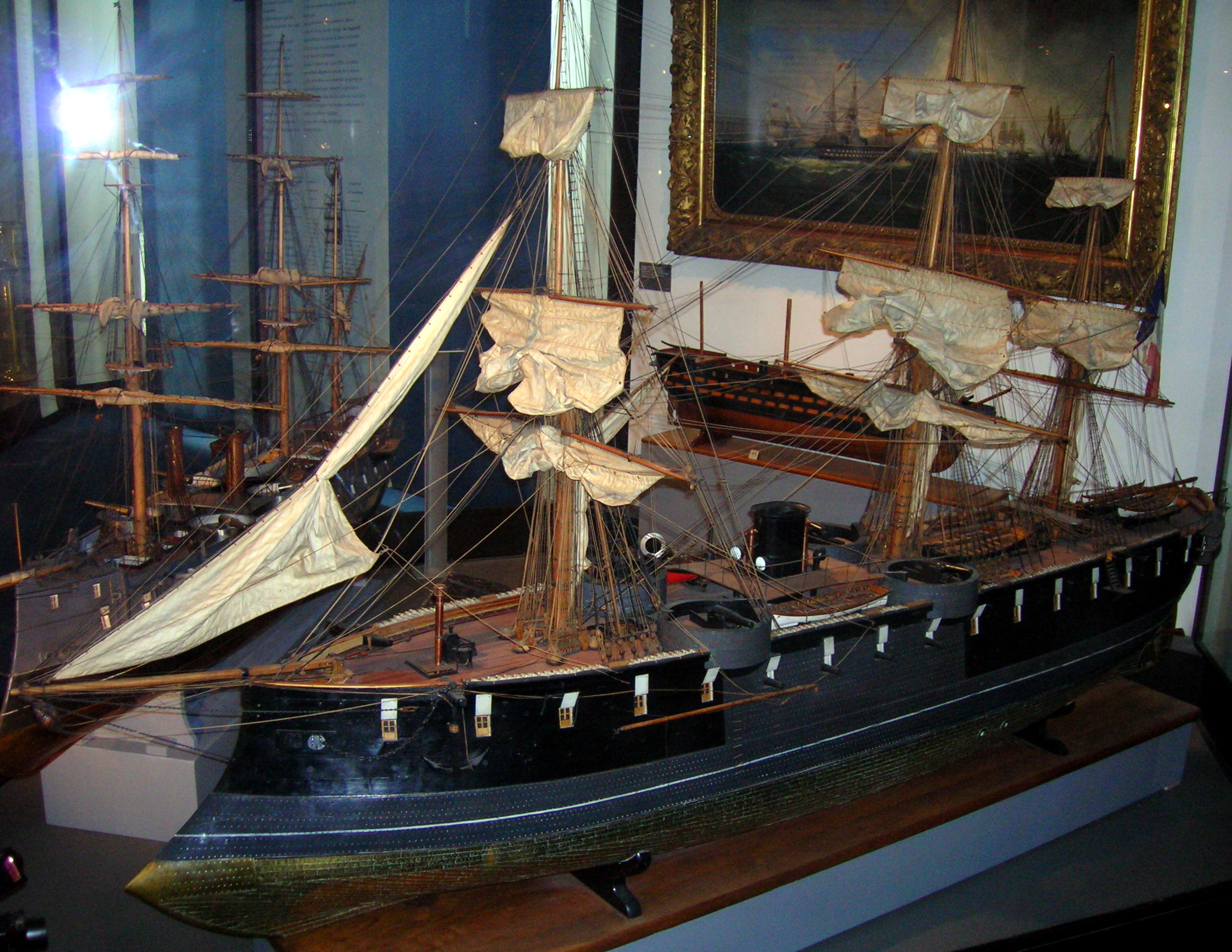
- Model of Océan on display at the Musée de la Marine, Paris

History

France
- Name: Marengo
- Namesake: Battle of Marengo
- Builder: Arsenal de Toulon
- Laid down: July 1865
- Launched: 4 December 1869
- Commissioned: 1872
- Stricken: 1895
- Fate: Sold, 7 March 1895

General characteristics
- Class & type: Océan-class ironclad
- Displacement: 7,860 t (7,740 long tons)
- Length: 86.2 m (282 ft 10 in)
- Beam: 17.52 m (57 ft 6 in)
- Draft: 9.09 m (29.8 ft)
- Installed power: 8 oval boilers; 3,600 ihp (2,700 kW)
- Propulsion: 1 shaft; 1 HRCR compound steam engine
- Sail plan: Barque or barquentine-rig
- Speed: 13 knots (24 km/h; 15 mph)
- Range: approximately 3,000 nautical miles (5,600 km; 3,500 mi) at 10 knots (19 km/h; 12 mph)
- Complement: 750–778
- Armament: 4 × single 274 mm (10.8 in) guns; 4 × single 240 mm (9.4 in) guns; 7 × single 138 mm (5.4 in) guns
- Armor: Belt: 178–203 mm (7.0–8.0 in); Battery: 160 mm (6.3 in); Barbettes: 150 mm (6 in)

Marengo was a wooden-hulled, Océan class, armored frigate, built for the French Navy in the mid to late 1860s. The ship was running her sea trials in July 1870 when the Franco-Prussian War began and was immediately placed in reserve until after the war was over. Marengo participated in the French occupation of Tunisia in 1881 and was flagship of the Northern Squadron in 1891 when it made port visits in Britain and Russia. She was sold for scrap in 1896.

== Design and description ==
The Océan-class ironclads were designed by Henri Dupuy de Lôme as an improved version of the Provence-class ironclads. The ships were central battery ironclads with the armament concentrated amidships. For the first time in a French ironclad three watertight iron bulkheads were fitted in the hull. Like most ironclads of their era they were equipped with a metal-reinforced ram.

The ship measured 87.73 meters (287 ft 10 in) overall, with a beam of 17.52 meters (57 ft 6 in). Marengo had a maximum draft of 9.09 meters (29 ft 10 in) and displaced 7,749 metric tons (7,627 long tons). Her crew numbered between 750 and 778 officers and men. The metacentric height of the ship was very low, between 1.7–2.2 feet (0.5–0.7 m).

=== Propulsion ===
The Océan-class ships had one horizontal return connecting rod compound steam engine driving a single propeller. Their engines were powered by eight oval boilers. On sea trials the engine produced 3,600 indicated horsepower (2,700 kW) and Marego reached 13.5 knots (25.0 km/h; 15.5 mph). She carried 650 metric tons (640 long tons) of coal which allowed her to steam for approximately 3,000 nautical miles (5,600 km; 3,500 mi) at a speed of 10 knots (19 km/h; 12 mph). The Océan-class ships were barque or barquentine-rigged with three masts and had a sail area around 2,000 square meters (22,000 sq ft).

=== Armament ===
These ships had their main armament mounted in four barbettes on the upper deck, one gun at each corner of the battery, with the remaining guns on the battery deck below the barbettes. Marengo's armament was upgraded, before she commissioned, to four 274-millimeter (10.8 in) guns in the barbettes, and on the battery deck, four 240-millimeter (9.4 in) and seven 138-millimeter (5.4 in) guns. By 1885 two more 274-millimeter guns had been added and all of the 138-millimeter guns were replaced by four 120-millimeter (4.7 in) guns.

The 18-caliber 274-millimeter Modéle 1870 gun fired an armor-piercing, 476.2-pound (216.0 kg) shell while the gun itself weighed 22.84 long tons (23.21 t). The gun fired its shell at a muzzle velocity of 1,424 ft/s (434 m/s) and was credited with the ability to penetrate a nominal 14.3 inches (360 mm) of wrought iron armour at the muzzle. The armor-piercing shell of the 19-caliber 240-millmeter Modele 1870 gun weighed 317.5 pounds (144.0 kg) while the gun itself weighed 15.41 long tons (15.66 t). It had a muzzle velocity of 1,624 ft/s (495 m/s) and was credited with the ability to penetrate a nominal 14.4 inches (366 mm) of wrought iron armour at the muzzle. The 138-millimeter gun was 21 calibers long and weighed 2.63 long tons (2.67 t). It fired a 61.7-pound (28.0 kg) explosive shell that had a muzzle velocity of 1,529 ft/s (466 m/s). The guns could fire both solid shot and explosive shells.

At some point the ship received a dozen 37-millimeter (1.5 in) Hotchkiss 5-barrel revolving guns. They fired a shell weighing about 500 g (1.1 lb) at a muzzle velocity of about 610 m/s (2,000 ft/s) to a range of about 3,200 meters (3,500 yd). They had a rate of fire of about 30 rounds per minute. The hull was not recessed to enable any of the guns on the battery deck to fire forward or aft. However, the guns mounted in the barbettes sponsoned out over the sides of the hull did have some ability to fire fore and aft. Late in the ship's career four above-water 356-millimeter (14.0 in) torpedo tubes were added.

=== Armor ===
The Ocean-class ships had a complete 178–203-millimeter (7.0–8.0 in) wrought iron waterline belt. The sides of the battery itself were armored with 160 millimeters (6.3 in) of wrought iron. The barbette armor was 150 millimeters (5.9 in) thick. The unarmored portions of their sides were protected by 15-millimeter (0.6 in) iron plates. Gardiner says that the barbette armor was later removed to improve their stability, but this is not confirmed by any other source.

== Service ==
Marengo was laid down at Toulon in July 1865 and launched on 15 October 1868. The ship began her sea trials on 1 July 1870 and was running them when the Franco-Prussian War of 1870–71 began. She was immediately put in reserve and not commissioned until 1872 for service with the Mediterranean Squadron. Marengo remained with the squadron until 1876 when she was again placed in reserve. On 2 October 1880 the ship was recommissioned and assigned to the Mediterranean Squadron. Marengo was transferred to the Levant Squadron (French: Division Navale du Levant) on 13 February 1881 and bombarded the Tunisian port of Sfax in July as part of the French occupation of Tunisia. She remained in the Mediterranean until 1886 when she was assigned to the Reserve Squadron. In 1888 Marengo became the flagship of the Northern Squadron and led the squadron during its port visits to Osborne Bay and Spithead in August 1891 and to Kronstadt in September 1891. She was reduced to reserve the following year and sold on 7 March 1896.
