= French ironclad Friedland =

French ironclad ship

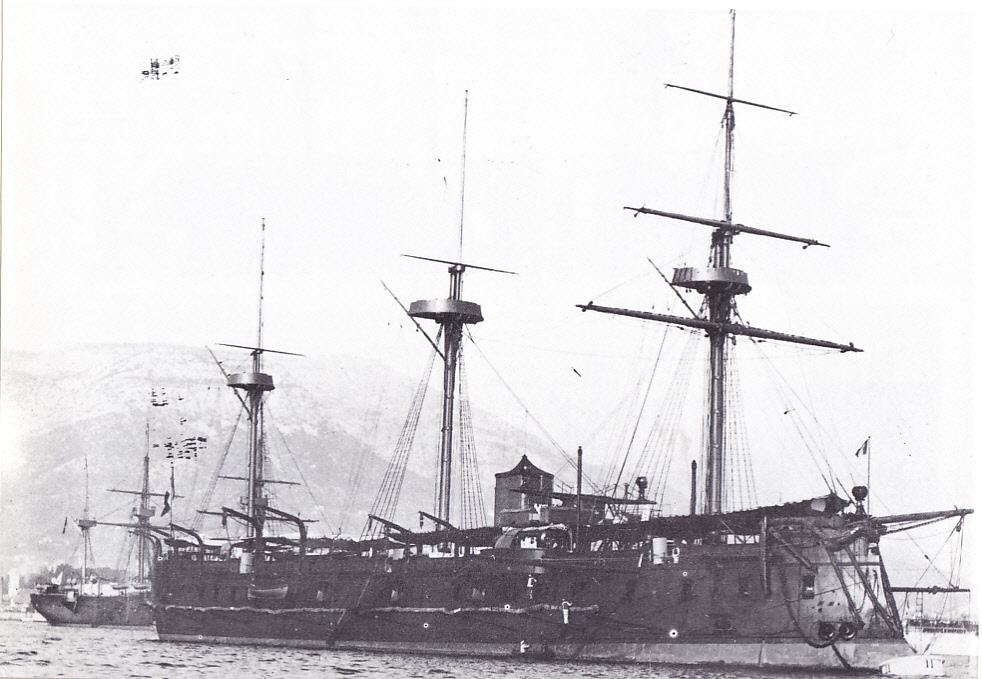
- French ironclad Friedland

Class overview
- Operators: French Navy
- Preceded by: Océan class
- Succeeded by: Richelieu
- Built: 1865–1877
- In service: 1877–1898
- In commission: 1877–1902
- Completed: 1
- Scrapped: 1

History

France
- Name: Friedland
- Namesake: Battle of Friedland
- Builder: Lorient
- Laid down: January 1865
- Launched: 25 October 1873
- Completed: 20 June 1877
- Decommissioned: 1898
- Fate: Condemned 1902

General characteristics
- Type: Central battery ironclad
- Displacement: 8,540 metric tons (8,410 long tons)
- Length: 101.1 m (331 ft 8 in)
- Beam: 17.7 m (58 ft 1 in)
- Draft: 8.6 m (28 ft 3 in)
- Installed power: 4,428 ihp (3,302 kW)
- Propulsion: 1 shaft, 1 Horizontal return connecting rod compound steam engine; 8 oval boilers
- Sail plan: Ship rig
- Speed: 13 knots (24 km/h; 15 mph)
- Range: 2,660 nautical miles (4,930 km; 3,060 mi) at 10 knots (19 km/h; 12 mph)
- Complement: 688
- Armament: 8 × 1 - 274 mm (10.8 in) guns; 8 × 1 - 138 mm (5.4 in) guns
- Armor: Belt: 220 mm (8.7 in); Battery: 160 mm (6.3 in); Bulkheads: 100 mm (3.9 in)

The French ironclad Friedland was originally intended to be an iron-hulled version of Océan-class armoured frigate built for the French Navy during the 1870s, but she was much altered during her prolonged construction. Named after the French victory at the Battle of Friedland in 1807, the ship spent the bulk of her career assigned to the Mediterranean Squadron and supported the French occupation of Tunisia in 1881. She was condemned in 1902 and demolished in Genoa, Italy.

== Design and description ==
Friedland was a central battery ironclad with the armament concentrated amidships. Like most ironclads of her era she was fitted with a plough-shaped ram.

The ship measured 101.1 meters (331 ft 8 in) overall, with a beam of 17.7 meters (58 ft 1 in). Friedland had a maximum draft of 8.6 meters (28 ft 3 in) and displaced 8,540 metric tons (8,410 long tons), some 750 metric tons (740 long tons) larger than the Ocean-class ironclads. Her crew numbered around 750 officers and men.

Five 100-millimetre (4 in) watertight bulkheads divided the hull into compartments, although they only reached up to the main deck. Friedland did not have a double bottom. The metacentric height of the ship was low, a little above 3 feet (0.9 m).

=== Propulsion ===
Friedland had one Indret 3-cylinder horizontal return connecting rod compound steam engine driving a single propeller. Its engine was powered by eight oval boilers. On sea trials the engine produced 4,428 indicated horsepower (3,302 kW) and Friedland reached 13.3 knots (24.6 km/h; 15.3 mph). She carried 630 metric tons (620 long tons) of coal which allowed her to steam for approximately 2,666 nautical miles (4,937 km; 3,068 mi) at a speed of 10 knots (19 km/h; 12 mph). Friedland was initially ship rigged with three masts, then barque-rigged and finally fore-and-aft rigged after her mainmast was removed.

=== Armament and armour ===
Two 274-millimetre Modèle 1870 guns were mounted in barbettes on the upper deck, one gun at the forward corner of the battery, with the remaining six 274-millimetre Modèle 1870 guns on the battery deck below the barbettes. Eight 138-millimetre Modèle 1870 guns were on the upper deck, fore and aft of the barbettes, and on the battery deck.

The 18-calibre 274-millimeter (10.8 in) gun fired an armour-piercing, 476.2-pound (216.0 kg) shell while the gun itself weighed 22.84 long tons (23.21 t). The gun fired its shell at a muzzle velocity of 1,424 ft/s (434 m/s) and was credited with the ability to penetrate a nominal 14.3 inches (360 mm) of wrought iron armour at the muzzle. The 138-millimeter (5.4 in) gun was 21 calibres long and weighed 2.63 long tons (2.67 t). It fired a 61.7-pound (28.0 kg) explosive shell that had a muzzle velocity of 1,529 ft/s (466 m/s). The guns could fire both solid shot and explosive shells.

At some point the ship received 22 37-millimeter (1.5 in) Hotchkiss 5-barrel revolving guns. They fired a shell weighing about 500 g (1.1 lb) at a muzzle velocity of about 610 m/s (2,000 ft/s) to a range of about 3,200 meters (3,500 yd). They had a rate of fire of about 30 rounds per minute. The hull was not recessed to enable any of the guns on the battery deck to fire forward or aft. However, the guns mounted in the barbettes sponsoned out over the sides of the hull did have some ability to fire fore and aft. In 1884 two above-water 356-millimeter (14.0 in) torpedo tubes were added. Two more were added in 1891.

Friedland had a complete 220-millimeter (8.7 in) wrought iron waterline belt. The sides and the transverse bulkheads of the battery itself were armoured with 160 millimeters (6.3 in) of wrought iron. The barbettes were unarmoured.

== Service ==
Friedland was laid down at Lorient in January 1865 and launched on 15 October 1873. While the exact reason for such prolonged construction time is not known, the budget for the French Navy was cut after the Franco-Prussian War of 1870–71 and the French dockyards had not been reformed with working practices more suitable for the industrial age. The ship began her sea trials on 1 May 1875, but was not completed until 20 June 1877.

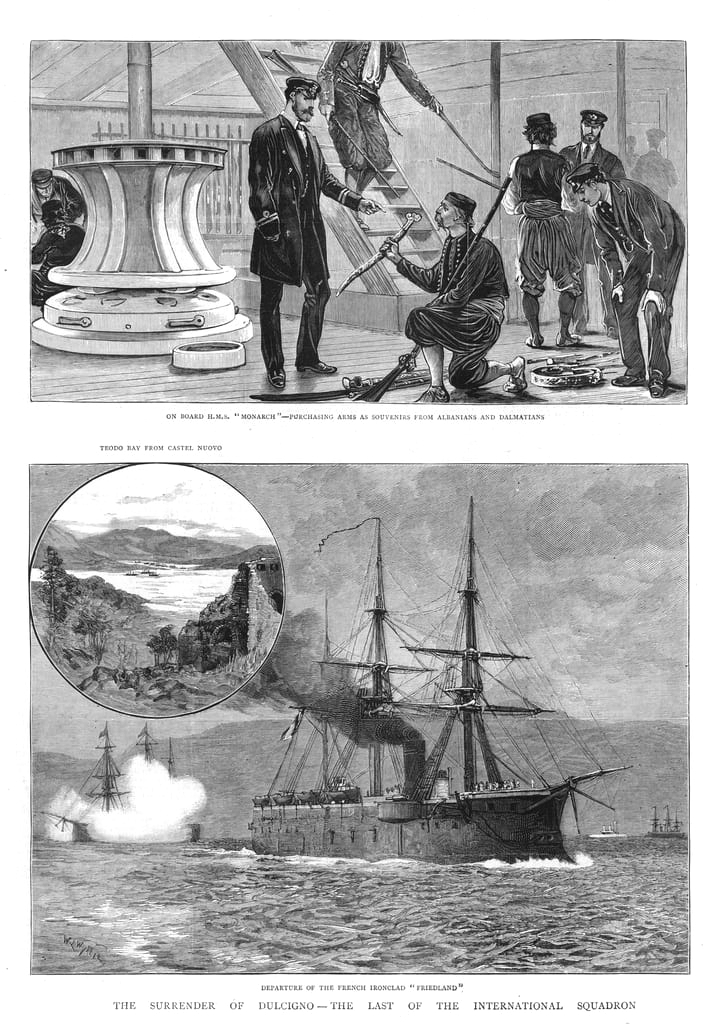
The Surrender of Dulcigno in 1880, the last of the International Squadron, convened by the Treaty of Berlin.The Graphic 1880

Friedland joined the Mediterranean Squadron in 1878 and the ship bombarded the Tunisian port of Sfax from 6–16 July 1881 as part of the French occupation of Tunisia. She was reduced to reserve in 1887 and decommissioned in 1893. Friedland returned to active duty in 1893, but was paid off in 1898 and condemned in 1902.
