= French ironclad Océan =

French armored frigate 1865–1895

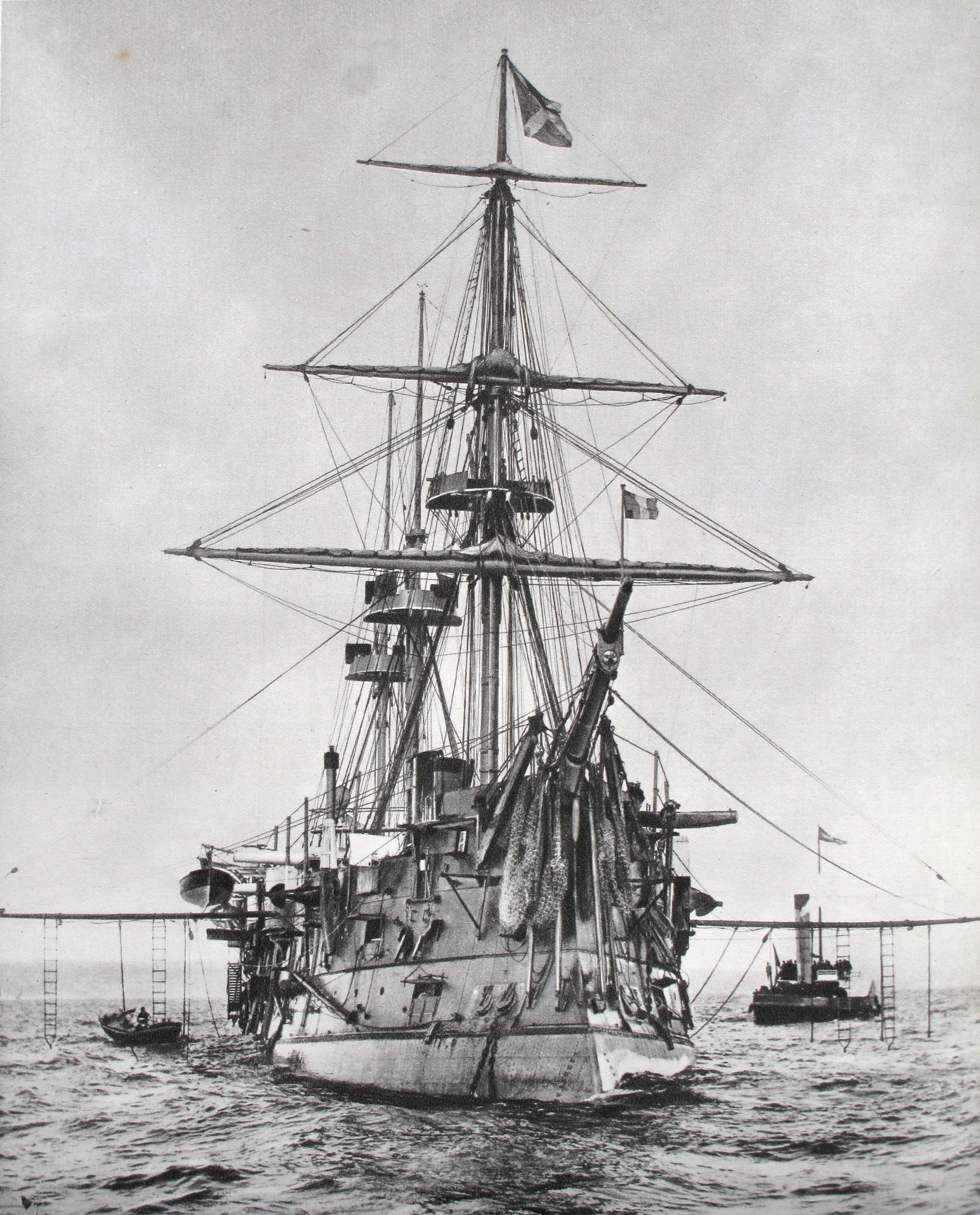
- Océan photographed by Neurdein

History

France
- Name: Océan
- Builder: Brest
- Laid down: 18 April 1865
- Launched: 15 October 1868
- Commissioned: 15 July 1870
- Stricken: 26 November 1894
- Fate: Broken up in 1895

General characteristics (Océan as built)
- Class & type: Océan-class ironclad
- Displacement: 7,749 metric tons (7,627 long tons)
- Length: 86.2 m (282 ft 10 in)
- Beam: 17.52 m (57 ft 6 in)
- Draft: 9.09 m (29.8 ft) (mean)
- Installed power: 3,780–4,180 indicated horsepower (2,820–3,120 kW)
- Propulsion: 1 shaft, 1 Horizontal return connecting rod compound steam engine; 8 oval boilers
- Sail plan: Barque or barquentine-rig
- Speed: 13–14 knots (24–26 km/h; 15–16 mph)
- Range: approximately 3,000 nautical miles (5,600 km; 3,500 mi) at 10 knots (19 km/h; 12 mph)
- Complement: 750–778
- Armament: 4 × 1 – 240 mm (9.4 in) guns; 4 × 1 – 194 mm (7.6 in) guns; 4 × 1 – 164 mm (6.5 in) guns
- Armor: Belt: 178–203 mm (7.0–8.0 in); Battery: 160 mm (6.3 in); Barbettes: 150 mm (6 in)

Océan was a wooden-hulled, armored frigate built for the French Navy in the mid to late 1860s and the lead ship of her class. She was commissioned in 1870 to participate in the Franco-Prussian War and was assigned to the Baltic Squadron that unsuccessfully attempted to blockade Prussian ports in the Baltic Sea. The ship later served in both the Northern and Mediterranean Squadrons before being discarded in 1894.

== Design and description ==
The Océan-class ironclads were designed by Henri Dupuy de Lôme as an improved version of the Provence-class ironclads. The ships were central battery ironclads with the armament concentrated amidships. For the first time in a French ironclad three watertight iron bulkheads were fitted in the hull. Like most ironclads of their era they were equipped with a metal-reinforced ram.

The ship measured 87.73 meters (287 ft 10 in) overall, with a beam of 17.52 meters (57 ft 6 in). Océan had a maximum draft of 9.09 meters (29 ft 10 in) and displaced 7,749 metric tons (7,627 long tons). Her crew numbered between 750 and 778 officers and men. The metacentric height of the ship was very low, between 1.7–2.2 feet (0.5–0.7 m).

=== Propulsion ===
The Océan-class ships had one horizontal return connecting rod compound steam engine driving a single propeller. Their engines were powered by eight oval boilers. On sea trials the engine produced 3,600 indicated horsepower (2,700 kW) and Océan reached 13.5 knots (25.0 km/h; 15.5 mph). She carried 650 metric tons (640 long tons) of coal which allowed her to steam for approximately 3,000 nautical miles (5,600 km; 3,500 mi) at a speed of 10 knots (19 km/h; 12 mph). The Océan-class ships were barque or barquentine-rigged with three masts and had a sail area around 2,000 square meters (22,000 sq ft).

=== Armament ===
These ships had their main armament mounted in four barbettes on the upper deck, one gun at each corner of the battery, with the remaining guns on the battery deck below the barbettes. Océan's original armament consisted of four 240-millimeter (9.4 in) guns in the barbettes, and on the battery deck, four 194-millimeter (7.6 in) and four 164-millimeter (6.5 in) guns. This was upgraded to four 274-millimeter (10.8 in) guns in the barbettes and eight 240-millimeter (9.4 in) guns on the battery deck before she was commissioned.

The 18-caliber 274-millimeter Modèle 1870 gun fired an armor-piercing, 476.2-pound (216.0 kg) shell while the gun itself weighed 22.84 long tons (23.21 t). The gun fired its shell at a muzzle velocity of 1,424 ft/s (434 m/s) and was credited with the ability to penetrate a nominal 14.3 inches (360 mm) of wrought iron armour at the muzzle. The armor-piercing shell of the 19-caliber 240-millmeter Modèle 1870 gun weighed 317.5 pounds (144.0 kg) while the gun itself weighed 15.41 long tons (15.66 t). It had a muzzle velocity of 1,624 ft/s (495 m/s) and was credited with the ability to penetrate a nominal 14.4 inches (366 mm) of wrought iron armour at the muzzle.

At some point the ship received a dozen 37-millimeter (1.5 in) Hotchkiss 5-barrel revolving guns. They fired a shell weighing about 500 g (1.1 lb) at a muzzle velocity of about 610 m/s (2,000 ft/s) to a range of about 3,200 meters (3,500 yd). They had a rate of fire of about 30 rounds per minute. The hull was not recessed to enable any of the guns on the battery deck to fire forward or aft. However, the guns mounted in the barbettes sponsoned out over the sides of the hull did have some ability to fire fore and aft. Late in the ship's career four above-water 356-millimeter (14.0 in) torpedo tubes were added.

=== Armor ===
The Ocean-class ships had a complete 178–203-millimeter (7.0–8.0 in) wrought iron waterline belt. The sides of the battery itself were armored with 160 millimeters (6.3 in) of wrought iron. The barbette armor was 150 millimeters (5.9 in) thick. The unarmored portions of their sides were protected by 15-millimeter (0.6 in) iron plates. Gardiner says that the barbette armor was later removed to improve their stability, but this is not confirmed by any other source.

== Service ==
Océan was laid down at Brest in July 1865 and launched on 15 October 1868. The ship began her sea trials on 3 December 1869, but was not commissioned until 21 July 1870 for service during the Franco-Prussian War of 1870–71. Océan was assigned to the Northern Squadron that attempted to blockade Prussian ports on the Baltic until the squadron was ordered to return to Cherbourg on 16 September 1870.

Afterward she was assigned to the Evolutionary Squadron until 1875 when she was placed in reserve. Océan was recommissioned in 1879 for service with the Mediterranean Squadron. She had a lengthy refit in 1884–85 and was assigned to the Northern Squadron after it was completed. Around 1888 the ship was transferred back to the Mediterranean Squadron until she was reduced to reserve around 1891. Océan was assigned to the Gunnery School that same year and later became a training ship for naval apprentices before being condemned in 1894.
