= French ironclad Richelieu =

French Navy wooden-hulled central battery ironclad

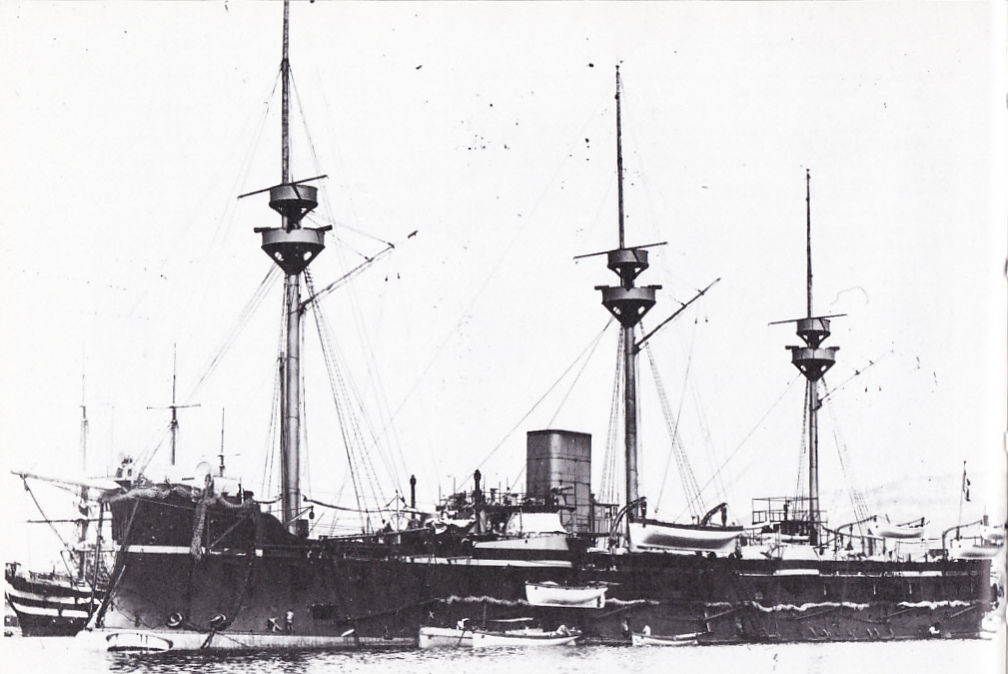

Class overview
- Operators: French Navy
- Preceded by: Friedland
- Succeeded by: Colbert class
- Built: 1869–1876
- In commission: 1876–1900
- Completed: 1
- Scrapped: 1

History

France
- Name: Richelieu
- Namesake: Cardinal Richelieu
- Builder: Toulon
- Laid down: 1 December 1869
- Launched: 3 December 1873
- Completed: 12 April 1875
- Decommissioned: 5 March 1900
- Fate: Sold for scrap in 1911

General characteristics
- Type: Central battery ironclad
- Displacement: 8,984 metric tons (8,842 long tons)
- Length: 101.7 m (333 ft 8 in)
- Beam: 17.4 m (57 ft 1 in)
- Draft: 8.5 m (28 ft)
- Installed power: 4,600 ihp (3,400 kW)
- Propulsion: 2 shafts, 2 Horizontal return connecting rod compound steam engines; 8 oval boilers
- Sail plan: Square rig
- Speed: 13 knots (24 km/h; 15 mph)
- Range: 3,300 nautical miles (6,100 km; 3,800 mi) at 10 knots (19 km/h; 12 mph)
- Complement: 750
- Armament: 6 × 1 - 274 mm (10.8 in) guns; 5 × 1 - 240 mm (9.4 in) guns; 10 × 1 - 120 mm (4.7 in) guns
- Armor: Belt: 220 mm (8.7 in); Battery: 160 mm (6.3 in); Bulkheads: 100 mm (3.9 in); Deck: 10 mm (0.4 in)

Richelieu (French pronunciation: [ʁiʃ(ə)ljø]) was a wooden-hulled central battery ironclad built for the French Navy in the early 1870s. She was named after the 17th-century statesman Cardinal Richelieu. The ship was the flagship of the Mediterranean Squadron for most of her career. Richelieu caught on fire in Toulon in 1880 and was scuttled to prevent her magazines from exploding. She was salvaged and, after being repaired, resumed her role as flagship. In 1886, however, the ship was placed in reserve and was eventually condemned in 1901. While being towed to the ship breakers in Amsterdam in 1911, Richelieu was caught in a storm in the Bay of Biscay and had to be cast loose from her tugboat. Nevertheless, the ship survived the storm and was recovered near the Scilly Isles from where she was towed to her final destination.

== Design and description ==
Richelieu was designed by Henri Dupuy de Lôme as an improved version of the Océan-class ironclads. As a central battery ironclad she had her armament concentrated amidships. Like most ironclads of her era she was equipped with a plough-shaped ram that projected 10 feet (3.0 m) from her hull. Her crew numbered around 750 officers and men. The metacentric height of the ship was very low, a little above 1.5 feet (0.5 m).

The ship measured 101.7 meters (333 ft 8 in) overall, with a beam of 17.4 meters (57 ft 1 in). Richelieu had a maximum draft of 8.5 meters (27 ft 11 in) and displaced 8,984 metric tons (8,842 long tons).

=== Propulsion ===
Richelieu was given two propellers by Henri Dupuy de Lôme to make her more maneuverable for ramming. She had two Indret 3-cylinder horizontal return connecting rod compound steam engines, each driving a single propeller. Her engines were powered by eight oval boilers. On sea trials the engines produced 4,600 indicated horsepower (3,400 kW) and Richelieu reached 13.2 knots (24.4 km/h; 15.2 mph). She carried 640 metric tons (630 long tons) of coal which allowed her to steam for approximately 3,300 nautical miles (6,100 km; 3,800 mi) at a speed of 10 knots (19 km/h; 12 mph). Richelieu was initially square rigged with three masts, then cut down to a schooner rig.

=== Armament ===
Plan and profile of Richelieu

Richelieu's intermediate armament of four Canon de 24 C modèle 1870 240-millimeter (9.4 in) guns was mounted in barbettes on the upper deck, one gun at each corner of the battery, with her six 274-millimeter (10.8 in) guns on the battery deck below the barbettes. One 240-millimeter gun was mounted in the forecastle as a chase gun. The ship's secondary armament consisted of ten 120-millimeter (4.7 in) guns. These were later replaced by six 138-millimeter (5.4 in) guns.

The 18-caliber 274-millimeter Modéle 1870 gun fired an armor-piercing, 476.2-pound (216.0 kg) shell while the gun itself weighed 22.84 long tons (23.21 t). The gun fired its shell at a muzzle velocity of 1,424 ft/s (434 m/s) and was credited with the ability to penetrate a nominal 14.3 inches (360 mm) of wrought iron armour at the muzzle. The armor-piercing shell of the 19-caliber 240-millmeter Modele 1870 gun weighed 317.5 pounds (144.0 kg) while the gun itself weighed 15.41 long tons (15.66 t). It had a muzzle velocity of 1,624 ft/s (495 m/s) and was credited with the ability to penetrate a nominal 14.4 inches (366 mm) of wrought iron armor at the muzzle. The 138-millimeter gun was 21 calibers long and weighed 2.63 long tons (2.67 t). It fired a 61.7-pound (28.0 kg) explosive shell that had a muzzle velocity of 1,529 ft/s (466 m/s). The guns could fire both solid shot and explosive shells.

At some point the ship received eight, and then later ten more, 37-millimeter (1.5 in) Hotchkiss 5-barrel revolving guns. They fired a shell weighing about 500 g (1.1 lb) at a muzzle velocity of about 610 m/s (2,000 ft/s) to a range of about 3,200 meters (3,500 yd). They had a rate of fire of about 30 rounds per minute. The hull was not recessed to enable any of the guns on the battery deck to fire forward or aft. However, the guns mounted in the barbettes sponsoned out over the sides of the hull did have some ability to fire fore and aft. Late in the ship's career four above-water 356-millimeter (14.0 in) torpedo tubes were added.

=== Armor ===
Richelieu had a complete 220-millimeter (8.7 in) wrought iron waterline belt. The sides and the transverse bulkheads of the battery itself were armored with 160 millimeters (6.3 in) of wrought iron. The barbettes were unarmored, but the deck was protected by 10 mm (0.4 in) of armor.

== Service ==
Illustration of Richelieu

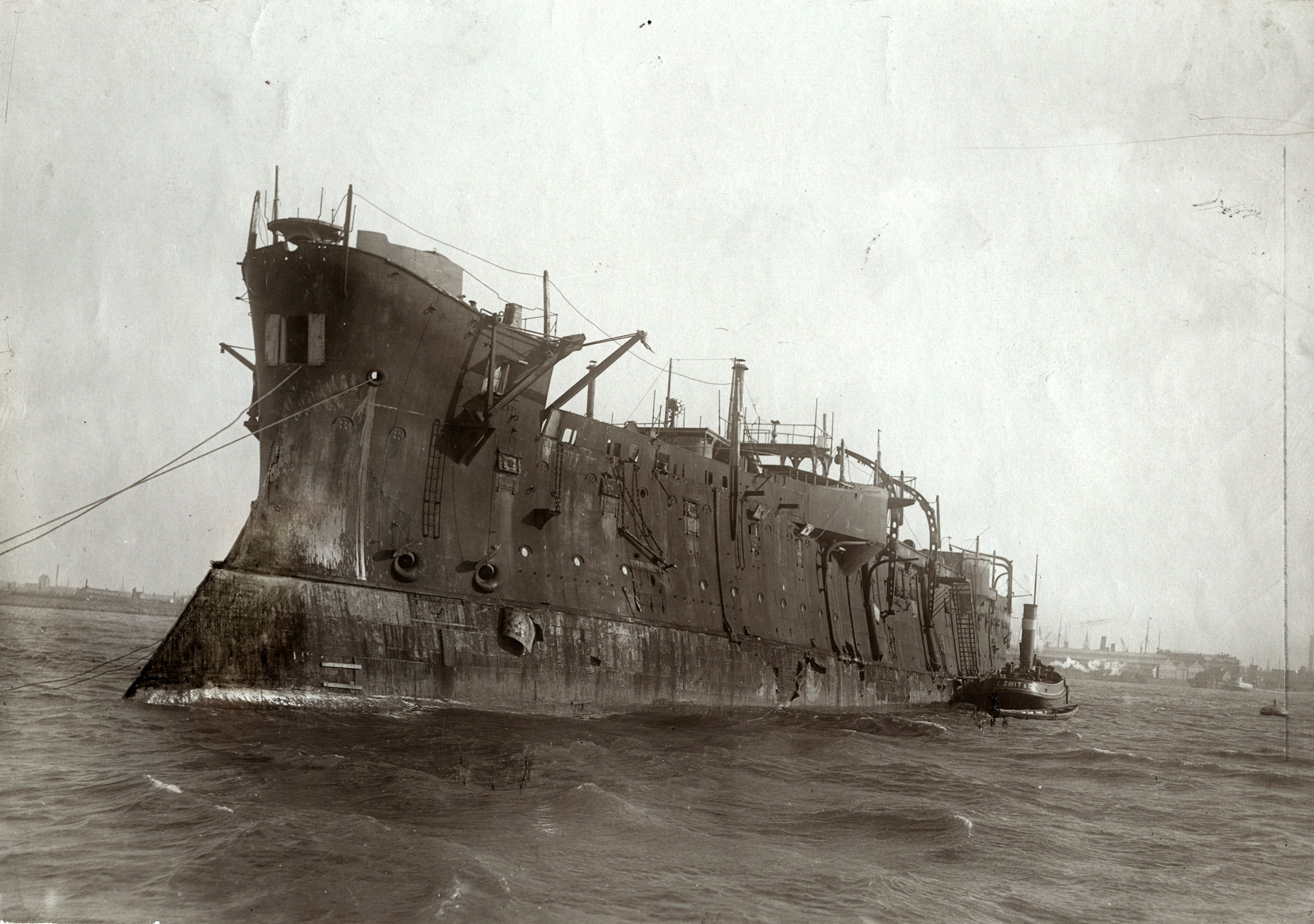
Before being broken up in Amsterdam, 1911

Richelieu was laid down at Toulon in 1869 and launched on 3 December 1873. While the exact reason for such prolonged construction time is not known, it was probably due to financial pressures caused by slashing of French Navy's budget which was cut after the Franco-Prussian War of 1870–71 coupled with the outdated work practices of the French dockyards at the time, which were not suitable for the Industrial Age. The ship began her sea trials on 12 April 1875, but did not begin her service with the Mediterranean Squadron, of which she became flagship, until 10 February 1876. She was placed in reserve on 3 December 1879.

While in Toulon harbor on 29 December 1880, Richelieu caught fire and had to be scuttled to prevent her magazines from exploding. The ship capsized to port in 10.75 meters (35.3 ft) of water; she lay on her barbettes almost at a 90° angle. In order to salvage her, all accessible guns, ammunition, masts, armor and movable decks were removed and the equivalent weight was placed in the ship's holds to lower her center of gravity. A sheer hulk was moved to her port side and cables were connected to Sibylle on the other side of Richelieu. 360 empty casks and 34 cubic meters (1,200 cu ft) of cork were attached to the starboard side to prevent the ship from rolling too far the other way. After an hour and a half of lifting, Richelieu had been righted to a 45° angle; a subsequent effort completed the job.

Richelieu was repaired and returned to service as the flagship of the Mediterranean Squadron on 8 October 1881 where she remained until 1886. The squadron made port visits in Tangiers and Lisbon in 1884 before sailing to Brest and Cherbourg for exercises. In 1885 Richelieu tested Bullivant torpedo nets, but they reduced her speed to a maximum of 4 knots (7.4 km/h; 4.6 mph) and as a result were not considered successful. The ship was placed back in reserve in 1886 and became flagship of the Reserve Squadron on 8 September 1892, which, despite its name, consisted of ships in commission. The squadron conducted exercises from June to August 1892 in French waters. Richelieu was condemned on 5 March 1900, but was not immediately sold. After having been sold to Dutch ship breakers, Richelieu departed Toulon on 28 January 1911. She was under tow in the Bay of Biscay, having left the Mediterranean for the first time in her existence, when a storm caused the tugboat to cast her loose. The ship remained afloat and was subsequently recovered near the Scilly Isles, or drifted on to rocks in the Scilly Isles, and towed to Amsterdam where she was broken up.

== See also ==
- List of large sailing vessels
