= French ironclad Suffren =

French Navy's Océan-class ironclad

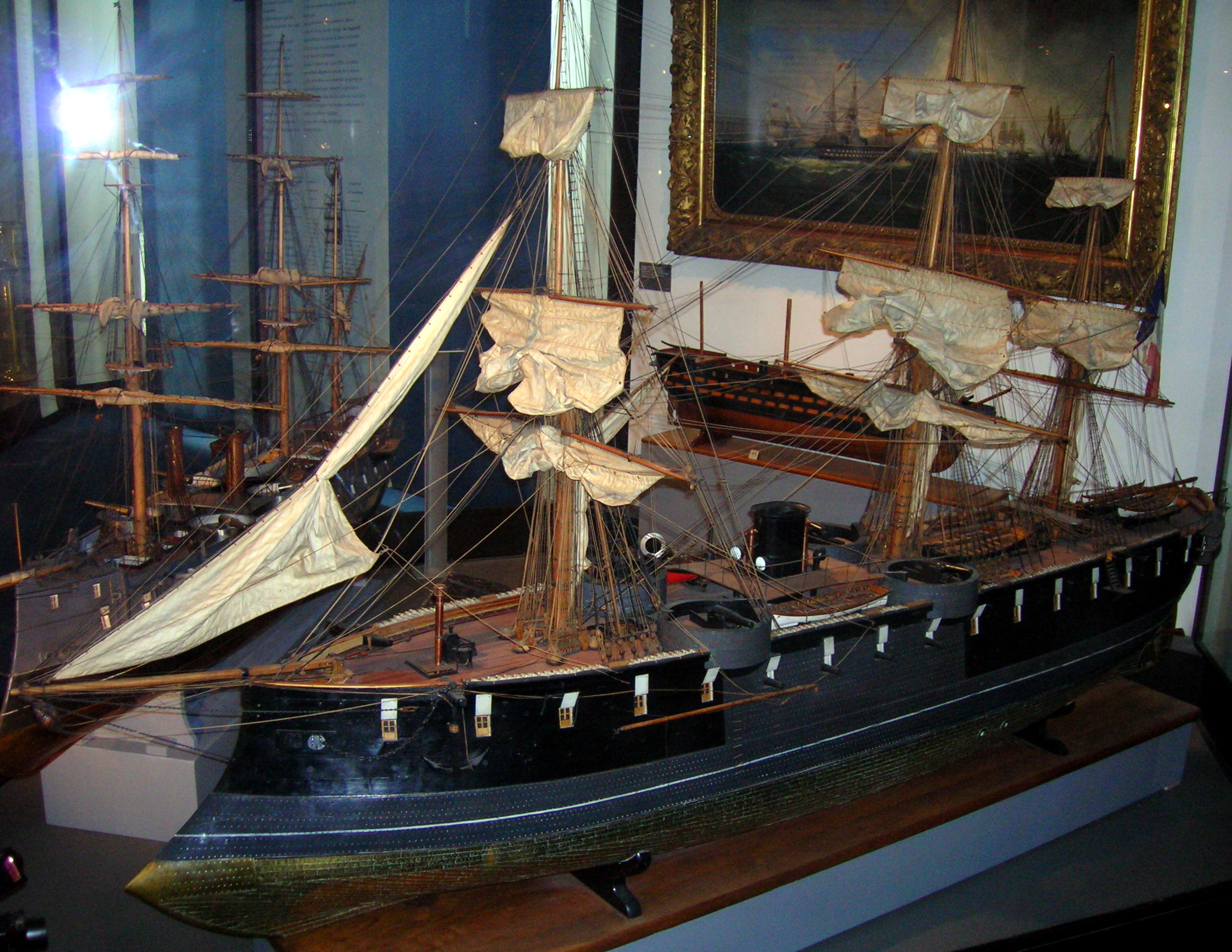
- Model of Océan on display at the Musée de la Marine, Paris

History

France
- Name: Suffren
- Namesake: Pierre André de Suffren de Saint Tropez
- Builder: Arsenal de Cherbourg
- Laid down: July 1866
- Launched: 26 December 1870
- Completed: 5 August 1873
- Commissioned: 1 March 1876
- Stricken: 1895
- Fate: Discarded 15 July 1897

General characteristics
- Class & type: Océan-class ironclad
- Displacement: 7,800 metric tons (7,700 long tons)
- Length: 86.2 m (282 ft 10 in)
- Beam: 17.52 m (57 ft 6 in)
- Draft: 9.09 m (29.8 ft)
- Installed power: 4,100 ihp (3,100 kW)
- Propulsion: 1 shaft, 1 Horizontal return connecting rod compound steam engine; 8 oval boilers
- Sail plan: Barque or barquentine-rig
- Speed: 14 knots (26 km/h; 16 mph)
- Range: approximately 3,000 nautical miles (5,600 km; 3,500 mi) at 10 knots (19 km/h; 12 mph)
- Complement: 750–778
- Armament: 4 × 1 – 274 mm (10.8 in) guns; 4 × 1 – 240 mm (9.4 in) guns; 6 × 1 – 138 mm (5.4 in) guns; 1 × 1 – 120 mm (4.7 in) guns
- Armor: Belt: 178–203 mm (7.0–8.0 in); Battery: 160 mm (6.3 in); Barbettes: 150 mm (6 in)

Suffren was a wooden-hulled, armored frigate of the Océan class, built for the French Navy in the mid to late 1860s. Although she was laid down in 1866, the ship was not launched until 1870 and commissioned in 1876. Suffren was one of the French ships assigned to the international squadron gathered to force the Ottoman Empire to carry out its obligations under the Treaty of Berlin in 1880. The ship was paid off in 1895 and discarded two years later.

== Design and description ==
The Océan-class ironclads were designed by Henri Dupuy de Lôme as an improved version of the Provence-class ironclads. The ships were central battery ironclads, with the armament concentrated amidships. For the first time in a French ironclad three watertight iron bulkheads were fitted in the hull. Like most ironclads of their era, they were equipped with a metal-reinforced ram.

The ship measured 87.73 meters (287 ft 10 in) overall, with a beam of 17.52 meters (57 ft 6 in). Suffren had a maximum draft of 9.09 meters (29 ft 10 in) and displaced 7,800 metric tons (7,700 long tons). Her crew numbered between 750 and 778 officers and men. The metacentric height of the ship was very low, between 1.7–2.2 feet (0.5–0.7 m).

=== Propulsion ===
The Océan-class ships had one horizontal return connecting rod compound steam engine driving a single propeller. Their engines were powered by eight oval boilers. On sea trials the engine produced 4,100 indicated horsepower (3,100 kW) and Suffren reached 14.3 knots (26.5 km/h; 16.5 mph). She carried 650 metric tons (640 long tons) of coal which allowed her to steam for approximately 3,000 nautical miles (5,600 km; 3,500 mi) at a speed of 10 knots (19 km/h; 12 mph). The Océan-class ships were barque or barquentine-rigged with three masts and had a sail area around 2,000 square meters (22,000 sq ft).

=== Armament ===
These ships had their main armament mounted in four barbettes on the upper deck, one gun at each corner of the battery, with the remaining guns on the battery deck below the barbettes. Suffren's armament was upgraded, before she commissioned, to four 274-millimeter (10.8 in) guns in the barbettes, and on the battery deck, four 240-millimeter (9.4 in) guns, six 138-millimeter (5.4 in) guns and one 120-millimeter (4.7 in) gun. By 1885, all of the 138-millimeter guns were replaced by six 120-millimeter guns.

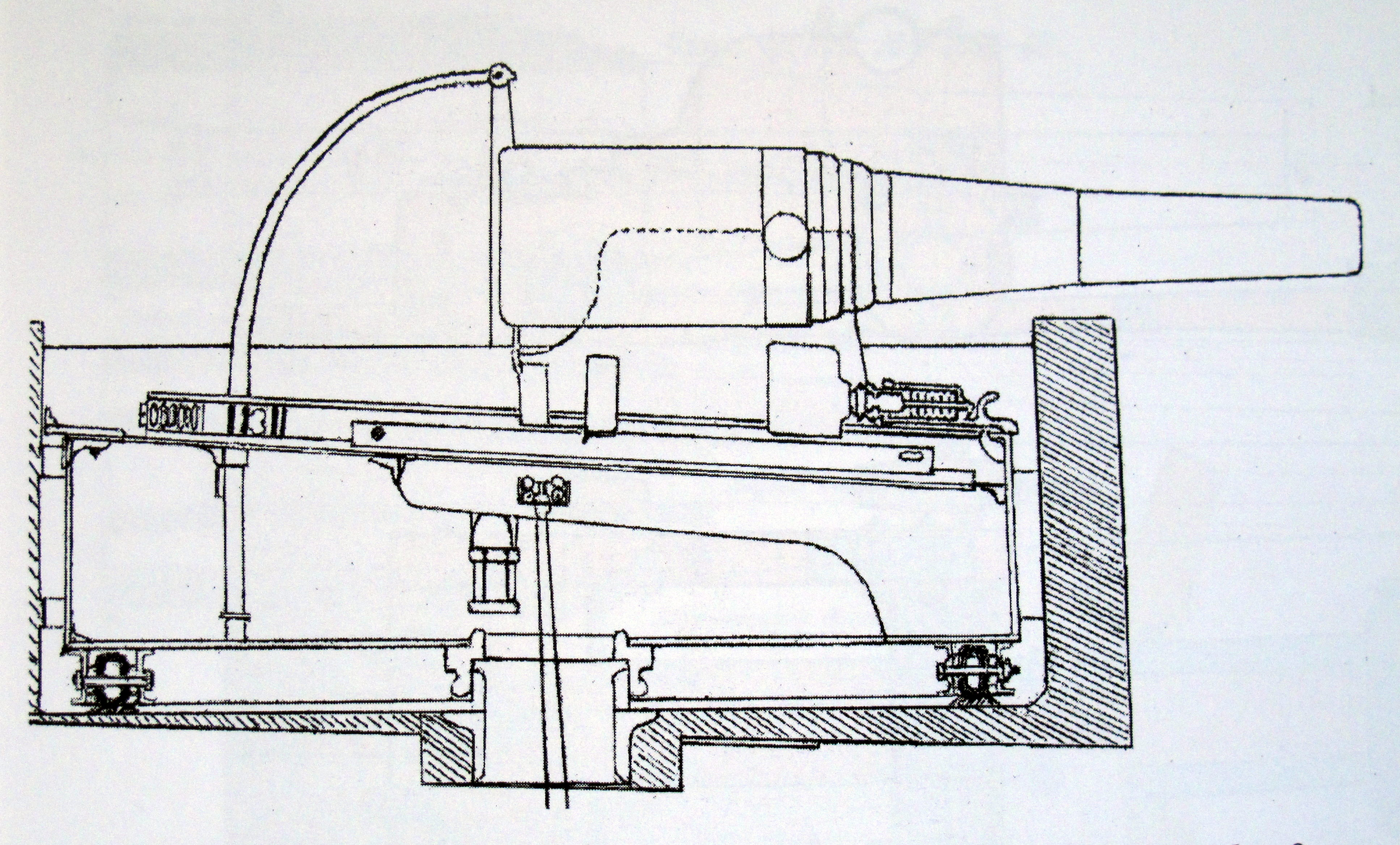
Barbettes of the Suffren

The 18-caliber 274-millimeter Modéle 1870 gun fired an armor-piercing, 476.2-pound (216.0 kg) shell while the gun itself weighed 22.84 long tons (23.21 t). The gun fired its shell at a muzzle velocity of 1,424 ft/s (434 m/s) and was credited with the ability to penetrate a nominal 14.3 inches (360 mm) of wrought iron armour at the muzzle. The armor-piercing shell of the 19-caliber 240-millmeter Modele 1870 gun weighed 317.5 pounds (144.0 kg) while the gun itself weighed 15.41 long tons (15.66 t). It had a muzzle velocity of 1,624 ft/s (495 m/s) and was credited with the ability to penetrate a nominal 14.4 inches (366 mm) of wrought iron armour at the muzzle. The 138-millimeter gun was 21 calibers long and weighed 2.63 long tons (2.67 t). It fired a 61.7-pound (28.0 kg) explosive shell that had a muzzle velocity of 1,529 ft/s (466 m/s). The guns could fire both solid shot and explosive shells.

At some point the ship received a dozen 37-millimeter (1.5 in) Hotchkiss 5-barrel revolving guns. They fired a shell weighing about 500 g (1.1 lb) at a muzzle velocity of about 610 m/s (2,000 ft/s) to a range of about 3,200 meters (3,500 yd). They had a rate of fire of about 30 rounds per minute. The hull was not recessed to enable any of the guns on the battery deck to fire forward or aft. However, the guns mounted in the barbettes sponsoned out over the sides of the hull did have some ability to fire fore and aft.

Late in the ship's career, four above-water 356-millimeter (14.0 in) torpedo tubes were added.

=== Armor ===
The Ocean-class ships had a complete 178–203-millimeter (7.0–8.0 in) wrought iron waterline belt. The sides of the battery itself were armored with 160 millimeters (6.3 in) of wrought iron. The barbette armor was 150 millimeters (5.9 in) thick. The unarmored portions of their sides were protected by 15-millimeter (0.6 in) iron plates. Gardiner says that the barbette armor was later removed to improve their stability, but this is not confirmed by any other source.

== Service ==
Suffren was laid down at Cherbourg in July 1866, but was not launched until 26 December 1870. The ship began her sea trials on 15 January 1873 and was completed on 5 August. She was placed into reserve after her completion and was not commissioned until 1 March 1876 when she became flagship of the Cherbourg Division. Throughout her career Suffren was often used as a flagship because of her spacious admiral's quarters.

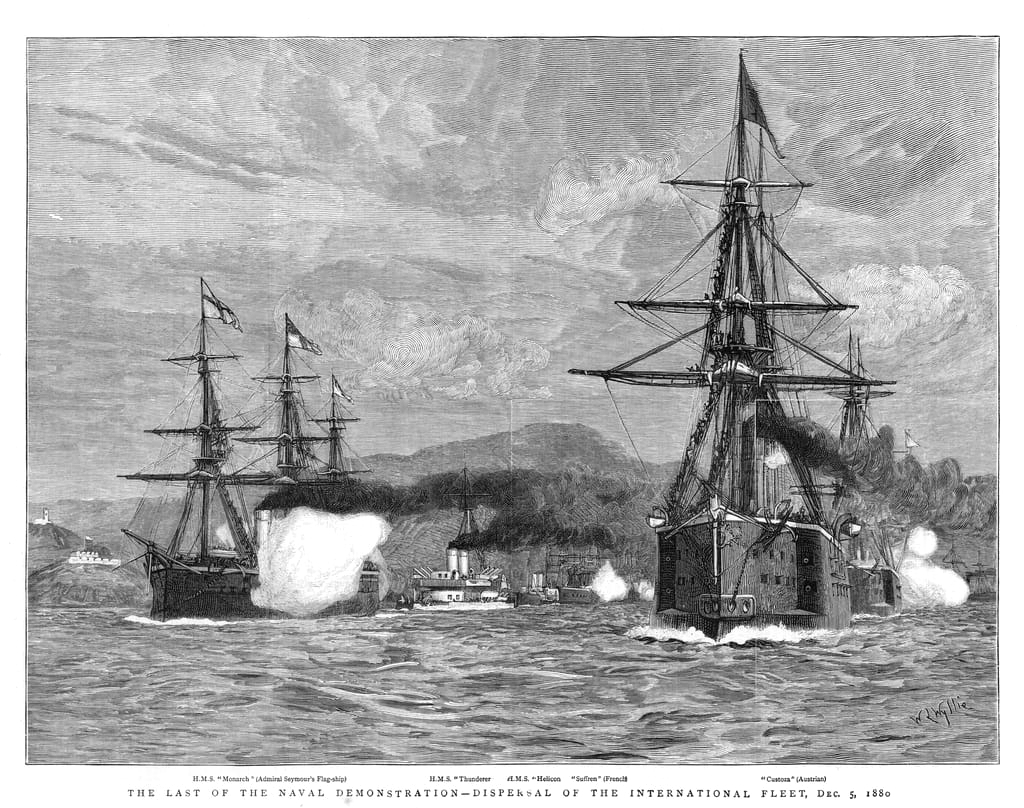
The dispersal of the International Fleet on 5 December 1880 convened for enforcing the Treaty of Berlin. The Graphic 1880

On 1 September 1880 the ship was assigned to the division that participated in the international naval demonstration at Ragusa later that month under the command of Vice Admiral Seymour of the Royal Navy in an attempt to force the Ottoman Empire to comply with the terms of the Treaty of Berlin and turn over the town of Ulcinj to Montenegro. Suffren was reduced to reserve in 1881 and not recommissioned until 23 August 1884 when she was assigned to the Northern Squadron. The ship was transferred to the Mediterranean Squadron about 1888 and remained there until paid off in 1895 and condemned in 1897.
