= French ironclad Colbert =

French Navy's Colbert-class ironclad

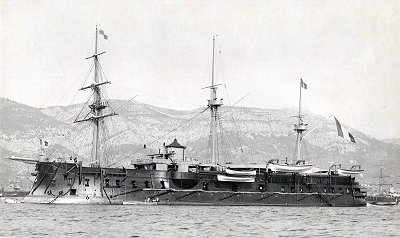
- Colbert at anchor

History

France
- Name: Colbert
- Namesake: Jean-Baptiste Colbert
- Builder: Arsenal de Brest
- Laid down: 7 May 1869
- Launched: 15 September 1875
- Completed: 1877
- Decommissioned: 1895
- Stricken: 11 August 1900
- Fate: Sold for scrap, 1909

General characteristics
- Class & type: Colbert-class ironclad
- Displacement: 8,617 metric tons (8,481 long tons)
- Length: 101.1 m (331 ft 8 in)
- Beam: 17.4 m (57 ft 1 in)
- Draft: 8.5 m (28 ft)
- Installed power: 4,600 ihp (3,400 kW); 8 oval boilers
- Propulsion: 1 shaft, 1 Horizontal return connecting-rod steam engine
- Sail plan: Ship rigged
- Speed: 14 knots (26 km/h; 16 mph)
- Range: 3,300 nautical miles (6,100 km; 3,800 mi) at 10 knots (19 km/h; 12 mph)
- Complement: 750
- Armament: 8 × single 274 mm (10.8 in) guns; 1 × single 240 mm (9.4 in) guns; 6 × single 138 mm (5.4 in) guns; 4 × 356-millimeter (14.0 in) torpedo tubes
- Armor: Belt: 180–220 mm (7.1–8.7 in); Battery: 160 mm (6.3 in); Bulkheads: 120 mm (4.7 in); Deck: 15 mm (0.6 in)

The French ironclad Colbert was the lead ship of the Colbert-class ironclads that were built for the French Navy in the 1870s. The ship was the flagship of the Mediterranean Squadron for most of her career. She took part in the French conquest of Tunisia, notably shelling and landing troops in Sfax on 15–16 July 1881. Colbert was paid off in 1895 and condemned in 1900. The ship was finally sold for scrap in 1909.

== Design and description ==
The Colbert-class ships were designed by Constructor Sabattier as improved versions of the ironclad Richelieu. As a central battery ironclad, Colbert had her armament concentrated amidships. Like most ironclads of her era she was equipped with a plough-shaped ram. Her crew numbered 774 officers and men. The metacentric height of the ship was low, a little above 2 feet (0.6 m).

The ship measured 101.1 meters (331 ft 8 in) overall, with a beam of 17.4 meters (57 ft 1 in). Colbert had a maximum draft of 8.5 meters (27 ft 11 in) and displaced 8,617 metric tons (8,481 long tons).

=== Propulsion ===
Colbert reverted to a single propeller shaft to improve her sailing qualities. She had one Wolf 3-cylinder horizontal return connecting rod compound steam engine. The engine was powered by eight oval boilers and was designed for a capacity of 4,600 indicated horsepower (3,400 kW). On sea trials the engine produced 4,652 indicated horsepower (3,469 kW) and Colbert reached 14.75 knots (27.32 km/h; 16.97 mph). She carried a maximum of 620 metric tons (610 long tons) of coal which allowed her to steam for approximately 3,300 nautical miles (6,100 km; 3,800 mi) at a speed of 10 knots (19 km/h; 12 mph). Colbert was ship rigged with three masts and had a sail area around 2,100 square meters (23,000 sq ft).

=== Armament ===
Colbert had two 274-millimeter (10.8 in) guns mounted in barbettes on the upper deck, one gun at the forward corners of the battery, with six additional guns on the battery deck below the barbettes. The side of the upper deck were cut away to improve the ability of the barbette guns to bear fore and aft. One 240-millimeter (9.4 in) was mounted in the forecastle as a chase gun. The ship's secondary armament consisted of six 138-millimeter (5.4 in) guns, four forward of the battery and two aft. These latter two guns were replaced in 1878 by another 240-millimeter gun as a stern chaser. The ship also mounted four above-water 356-millimeter (14.0 in) torpedo tubes.

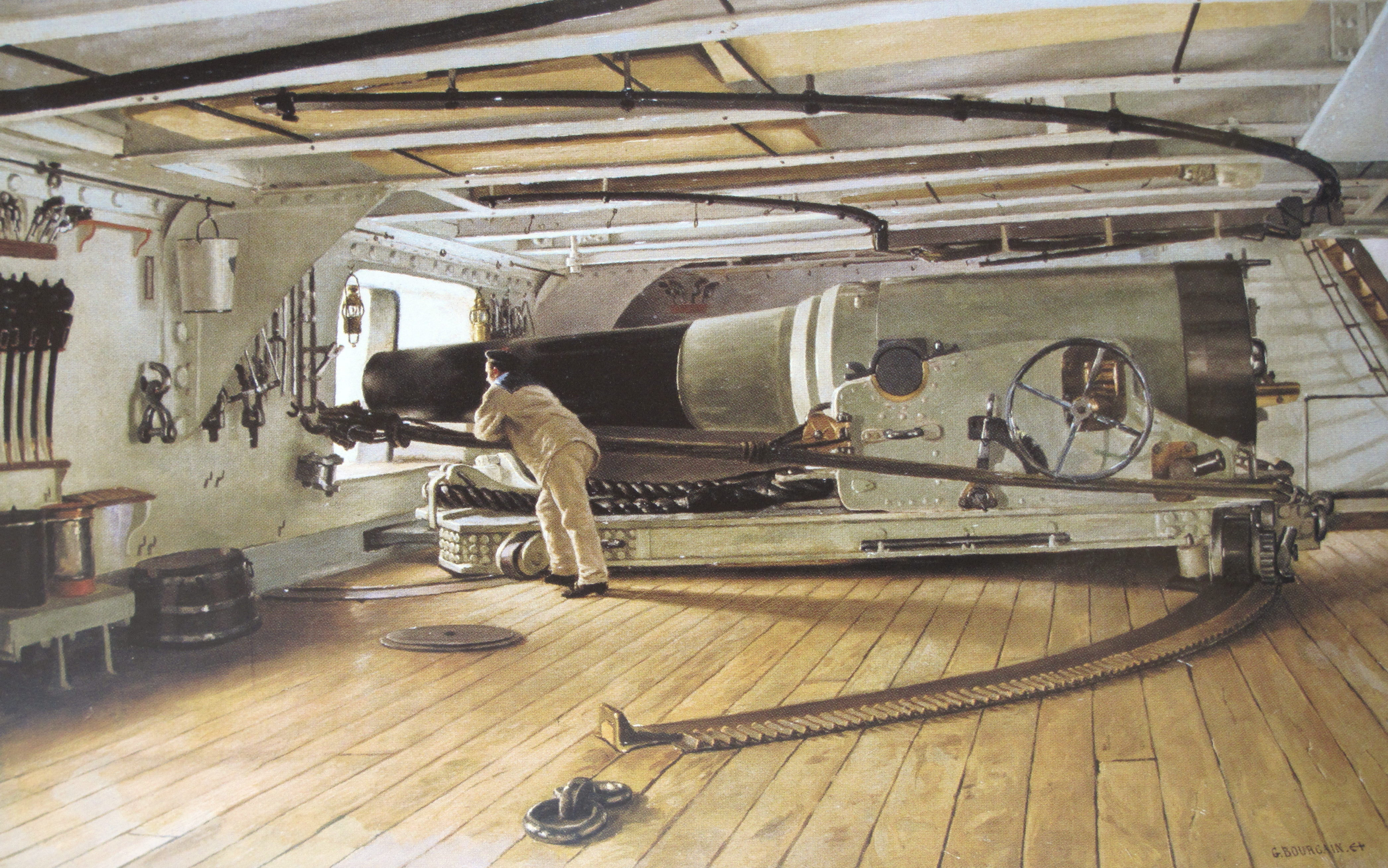
Canon de 27 cm modèle 1870 in the armoured section of a Colbert class ironclad, by Gustave Bourgain, circa 1885.

All of the ship's guns could fire both solid shot and explosive shells. The 274-millimeter Modèle 1870 gun was credited with the ability to penetrate a maximum of 14.3 inches (360 mm) of wrought iron armor while the 240-millmeter Modèle 1870 gun could penetrate 14.4 inches (366 mm) of armor.

At some point the ship received fourteen to eighteen 37-millimeter (1.5 in) Hotchkiss 5-barrel revolving guns. The gun had a range of about 3,200 meters (3,500 yd) and a rate of fire of about 30 rounds per minute.

=== Armor ===
The Colbert-class ships had a complete wrought iron waterline belt that was 220 millimeters (8.7 in) thick amidships and tapered to 180 millimeters (7.1 in) at the stern. It was backed by 89 millimeters (3.5 in) of wood. The sides of the battery itself were armored with 160 millimeters (6.3 in) of wrought iron, backed by 62 millimeters (2.4 in) of wood, and the ends of the battery were closed by transverse armored bulkheads 120 millimeters (4.7 in) thick, backed by 480 millimeters (18.9 in) of wood. The barbettes were unarmored, but the deck was 15 millimeters (0.59 in) thick.

== Service ==
Colbert was named in honor of Jean-Baptiste Colbert, Controller-General of Finances from 1665 to 1683 under King Louis XIV. She was laid down at Brest on 4 July 1870 and launched on 16 September 1875. While the exact reason for such prolonged construction time is not known, it is believed that reduction of the French Navy's budget after the Franco-Prussian War of 1870–71 and out-of-date work practices in French dockyards were likely causes. The ship began her sea trials on 23 May 1877, but became flagship of the Reserve Squadron on 31 August 1878. On 1 October 1879 she became the flagship of the Mediterranean Squadron; which post she would hold until 14 January 1890 when she was placed in reserve. Colbert bombarded the Tunisian port of Sfax on 15–16 July 1881 as the French occupied Tunisia.

In May 1887, Colbert took part in exercises to practice convoy escort; the French Army kept significant forces in French North Africa, and these units would have to be transported back to Europe in the event of a major conflict. The ship was assigned to escort a convoy of four simulated troop ships, along with the ironclads Courbet, Amiral Duperré, and Indomptable. A squadron of cruisers and torpedo boats was tasked with intercepting the convoy. The convoy used bad weather to make the passage, as heavy seas kept the torpedo boats from going to sea.

She became flagship of the Reserve Squadron again on 12 April 1892 until she was disarmed and paid off in 1895. She was condemned on 11 August 1900, before being sold for scrap in 1909.
