= Océan-class ironclad =

French Navy's Océan-class of three wooden-hulled armored frigates

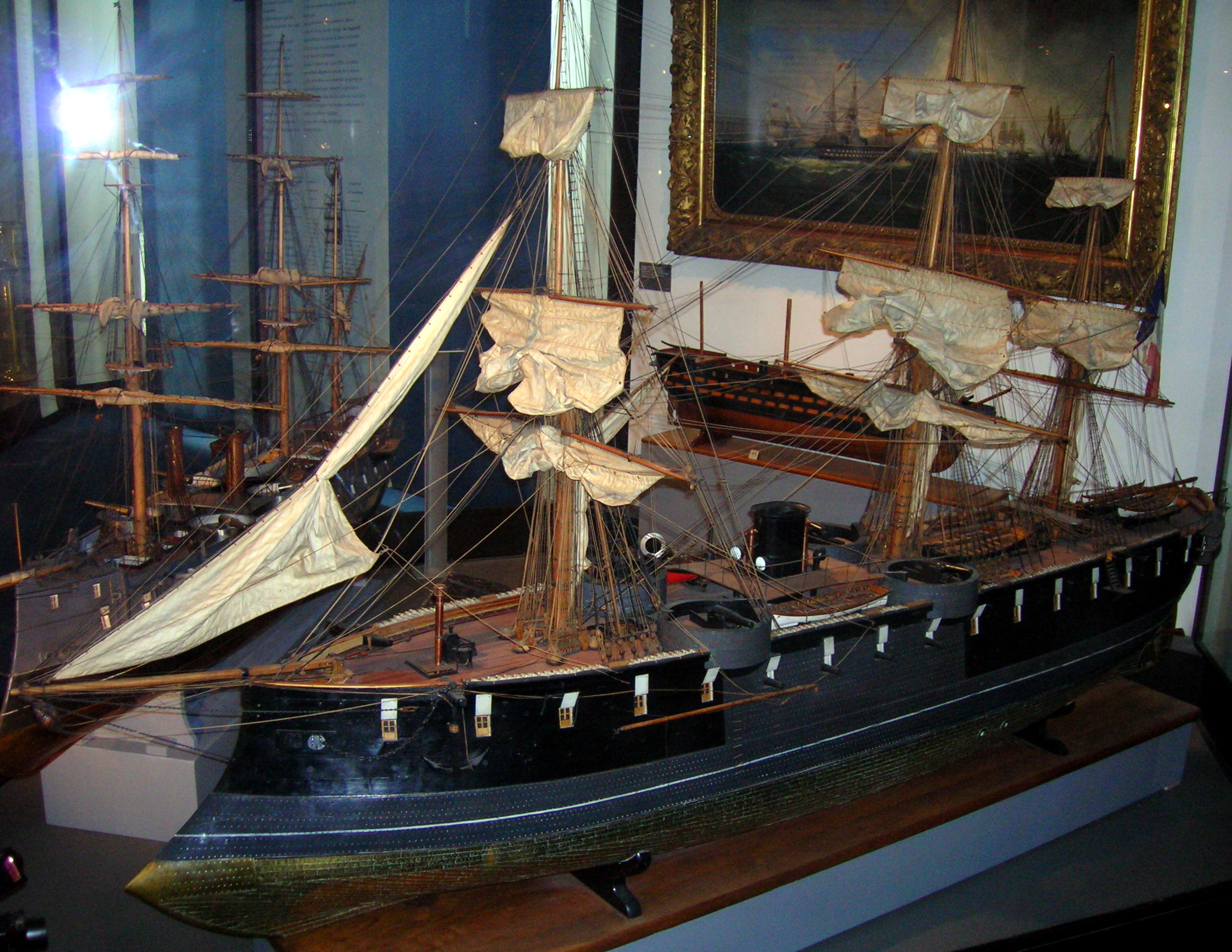
- Model of Océan on display at the Musée de la Marine, Paris

Class overview
- Name: Océan class
- Operators: French Navy
- Preceded by: Provence class
- Succeeded by: Friedland
- Built: 1865–1875
- In service: 1870–1897
- In commission: 1870–1895
- Completed: 3
- Scrapped: 3

General characteristics (Océan as built)
- Type: Ironclad
- Displacement: 7,749 t (7,627 long tons)
- Length: 86.2 m (282 ft 10 in)
- Beam: 17.52 m (57 ft 6 in)
- Draft: 9.09 m (29.8 ft)
- Installed power: 8 oval boilers; 3,780–4,180 ihp (2,820–3,120 kW)
- Propulsion: 1 shaft; 1 compound steam engine
- Sail plan: Barque or barquentine-rig
- Speed: 13 knots (24 km/h; 15 mph)
- Range: approximately 3,000 nmi (5,600 km; 3,500 mi) at 10 knots (19 km/h; 12 mph)
- Complement: 750–778
- Armament: 4 × single 240 mm (9.4 in) guns; 4 × single 194 mm (7.6 in) guns; 4 × single 164 mm (6.5 in) guns
- Armor: Belt: 178–203 mm (7–8 in); Battery: 160 mm (6.3 in); Barbettes: 150 mm (6 in)

The Océan-class ironclads were a class of three wooden-hulled armored frigates built for the French Navy in the mid to late 1860s. Océan attempted to blockade Prussian ports in the Baltic Sea in 1870 during the Franco-Prussian War and Marengo participated in the French conquest of Tunisia in 1881. Suffren was often used as the flagship for the Cherbourg Division, the Channel Division, Mediterranean Squadron and the Northern Squadron during her career. The ships were discarded during the 1890s.

== Design and description ==
The Océan-class ironclads were designed by Henri Dupuy de Lôme as an improved version of the Provence-class ironclads. The ships were central battery ironclads with the armament concentrated amidships. For the first time in a French ironclad three watertight iron bulkheads were fitted in the hull. Like most ironclads of their era they were equipped with a metal-reinforced ram.

The ships measured 87.73 meters (287 ft 10 in) overall, with a beam of 17.52 meters (57 ft 6 in). They had a maximum draft of 9.09 meters (29 ft 10 in) and displaced 7,749 metric tons (7,627 long tons). Their crew numbered between 750 and 778 officers and men. The metacentric height of the ships was very low, between 1.7–2.2 feet (0.5–0.7 m). The ships were over-weight as completed; their draught so exceeded that designed for them that an increase of stability by ballast was impossible. The Océan-class were reported to be able to carry all sail safely, were good sea-boats, steady and well-behaved, but lacking in stiffness (resistance to heeling).

=== Propulsion ===
The Océan-class ships had one horizontal-return, connecting-rod, compound steam engine, driving a single propeller using steam provided by eight oval boilers. On sea trials the engines produced between 3,600–4,100 indicated horsepower (2,700–3,100 kW) and the ships reached 13.5–14.3 knots (25.0–26.5 km/h; 15.5–16.5 mph). They carried 650 metric tons (640 long tons) of coal which allowed them to steam for approximately 3,000 nautical miles (5,600 km; 3,500 mi) at a speed of 10 knots (19 km/h; 12 mph). The Océan-class ships were barque or barquentine-rigged with three masts and had a sail area around 2,000 square meters (22,000 sq ft).

=== Armament ===
The initial design was to have a main armament of four 19 cm (7.5 in) guns and four 16 cm (6.3 in) guns on the main deck in an armoured central battery, and four 24-centimeter (9.4 in) guns in open-topped armoured barbettes on the spar deck. In 1869, the armament was changed to four Canon de 24 C modèle 1870 (9.4 in) guns in barbettes and either six or eight 24 cm guns in the battery, which was then changed to four 24 cm guns in barbettes and four 27 cm (10.8 in) cm guns in the battery, The ship's sides were not recessed, so the main deck guns could not fire fore or aft. But the barbettes were slightly sponsoned out over the sides of the hull. If the barbette guns were fired at angles smaller than 45 degrees from the keel-line, the crew had to be withdrawn from the extremities of the ship; for practical purposes, the arc of fire of each barbette was about 100 degrees. The main deck battery was 3.9 m (13 ft) above the waterline and the spar deck and barbette guns were 8.3 m (27 ft) above the waterline. The barbettes had steam-powered turntables.

They also had a secondary armament mounted on the broadside on the spar deck of six 12 cm (4.7 in) guns, the rear pair could be moved to the stern to fire aft.

The 18-caliber 27 cm Modéle 1870 gun had a caliber of 274 millimeters and fired an armor-piercing, 476.2-pound (216.0 kg) shell while the gun itself weighed 22.84 long tons (23.21 t). The gun fired its shell at a muzzle velocity of 1,424 ft/s (434 m/s) and was credited with the ability to penetrate a nominal 14.3 inches (360 mm) of wrought iron armour at the muzzle. The armor-piercing shell of the 19-caliber 24 cm Modele 1870 gun had a caliber of 240 millimeters weighed 317.5 pounds (144.0 kg) while the gun itself weighed 15.41 long tons (15.66 t). It had a muzzle velocity of 1,624 ft/s (495 m/s) and was credited with the ability to penetrate a nominal 14.4 inches (366 mm) of wrought iron armour at the muzzle. The 138-millimeter gun was 21 calibers long and weighed 2.63 long tons (2.67 t). It fired a 61.7-pound (28.0 kg) explosive shell that had a muzzle velocity of 1,529 ft/s (466 m/s). The guns could fire both solid shot and explosive shells.

By 1885 all of the 138-millimeter guns were replaced by four or six 120-millimeter (4.7 in) guns. At some point the ships received a dozen 37-millimeter (1.5 in) Hotchkiss 5-barrel revolving guns. They fired a shell weighing about 500 g (1.1 lb) at a muzzle velocity of about 610 m/s (2,000 ft/s) to a range of about 3,200 meters (3,500 yd). They had a rate of fire of about 30 rounds per minute. Late in the ships' careers four above-water 356-millimeter (14.0 in) torpedo tubes were added.

=== Armor ===
The Ocean-class ships had a complete 178–203-millimeter (7–8 in) waterline belt of wrought iron. The sides of the battery itself were armored with 160 millimeters (6.3 in) of wrought iron. The barbette armor was 150 millimeters (5.9 in) thick. The unarmored portions of their sides were protected by 15-millimeter (0.6 in) iron plates. Gardiner and Gibbons say that the barbette armor was later removed to improve their stability, but this is not confirmed by any other source.

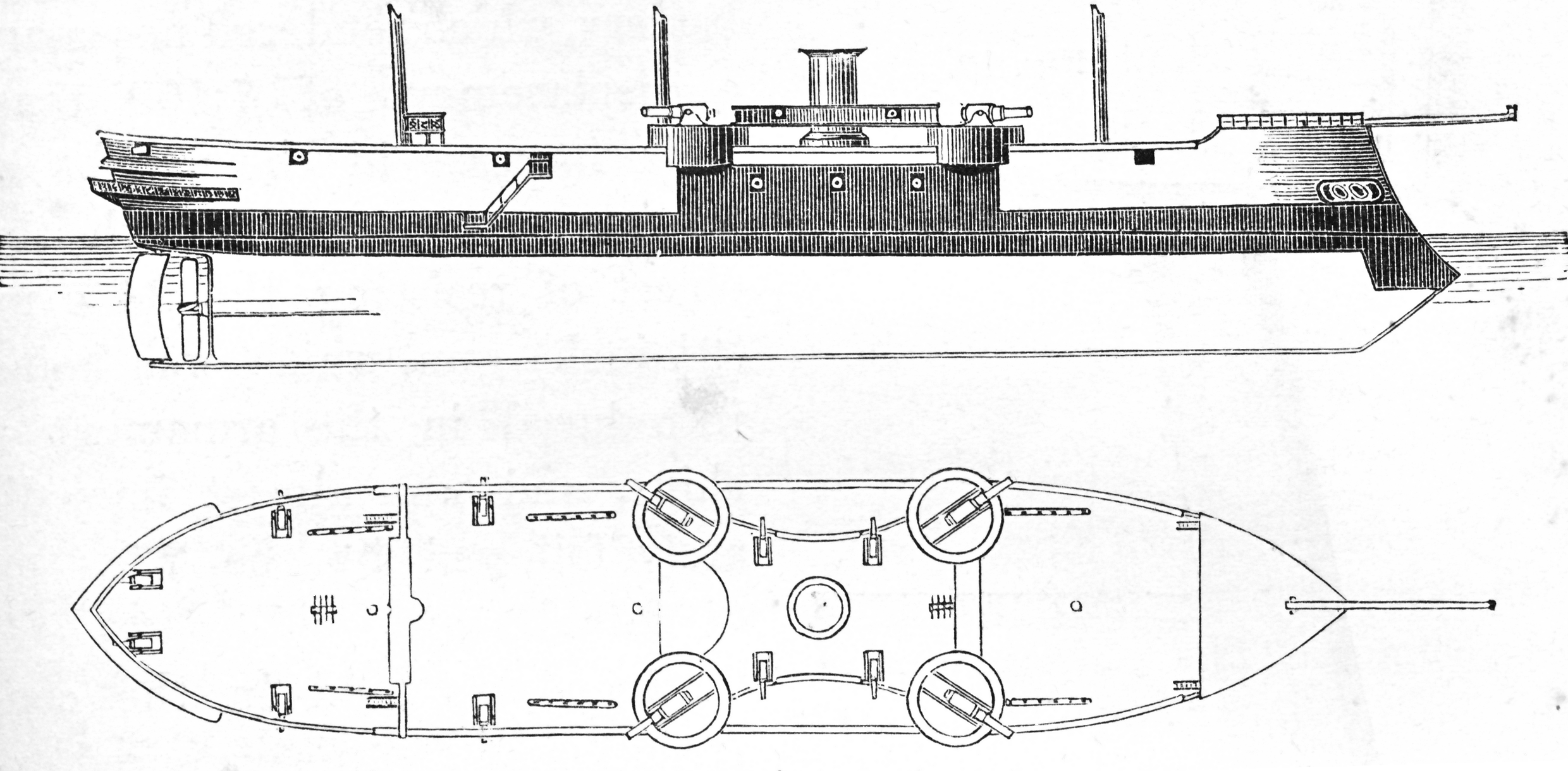
Armour and armament distribution on the Océan class

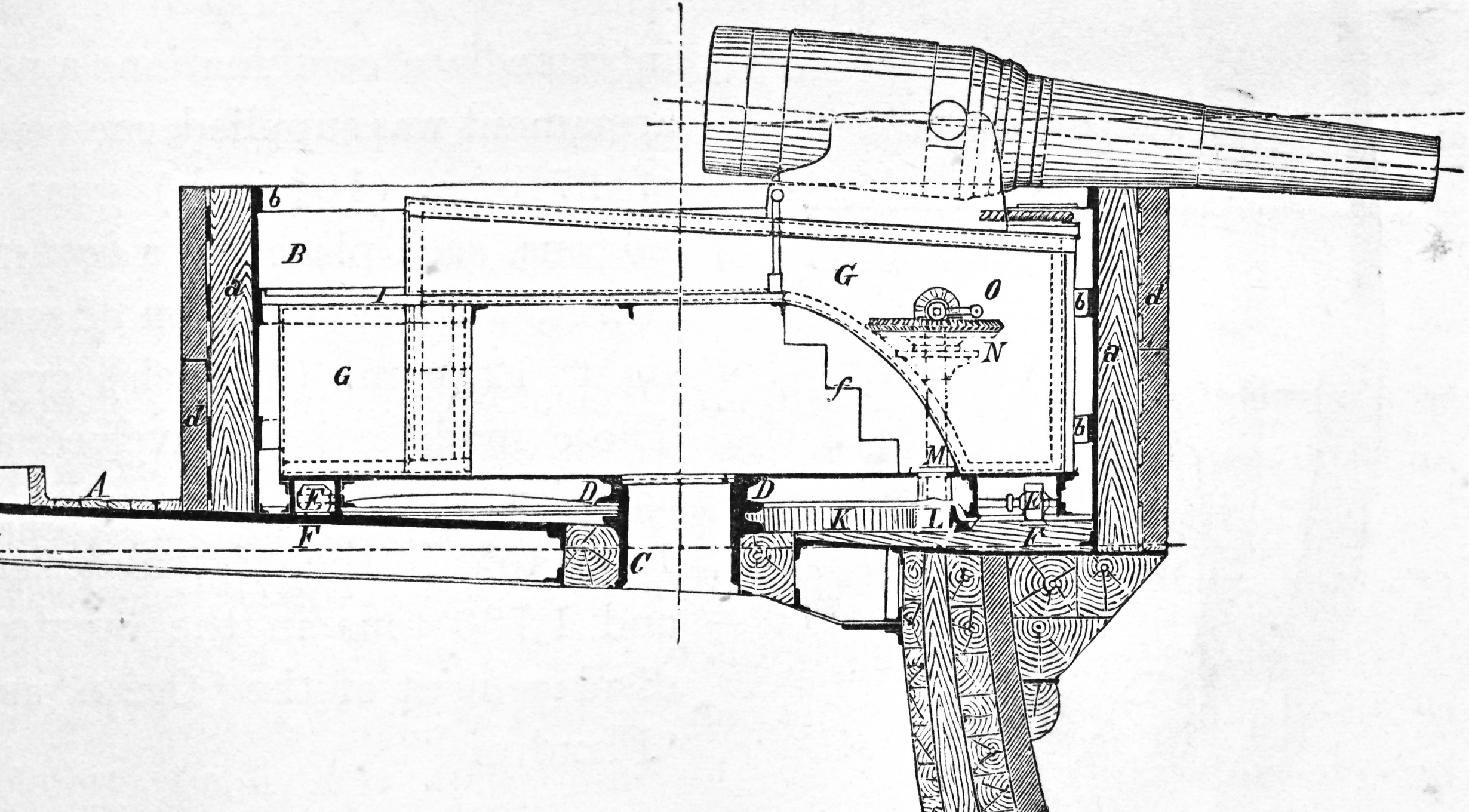
Barbette with the Canon de 24 C modèle 1870 of the Océan class
A Upper deck
a Backing
B Barbette
b Inner skin
C Pivot hollow for supply of ammunition
D Ring revolving on pivot
E Rollers
G Slide and carriage
I Platform for working gun
K Toothed rack
L, M, N, O Turning gear

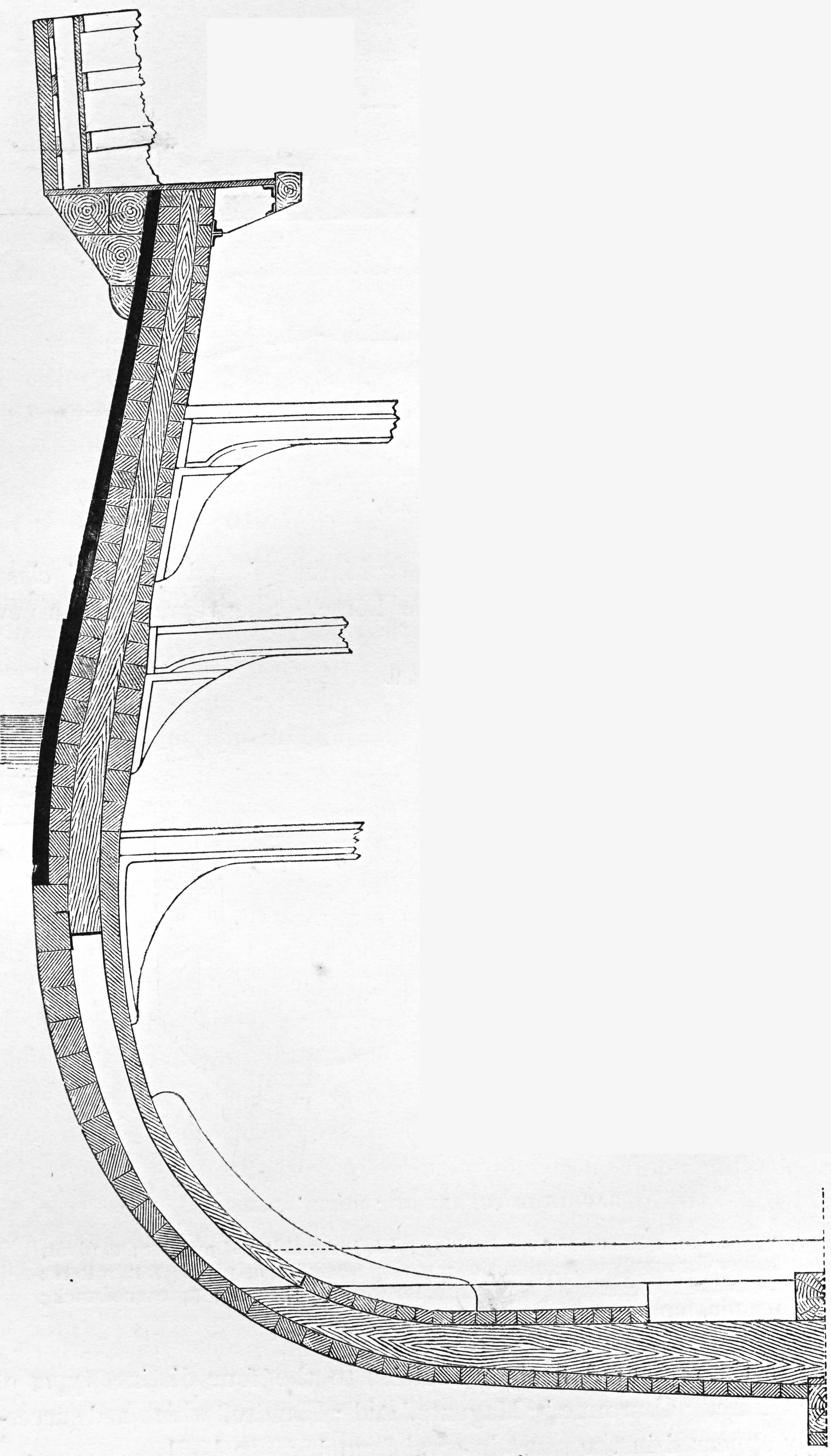
Section through the hull of French Ocean-class ironclad showing side armour and decks

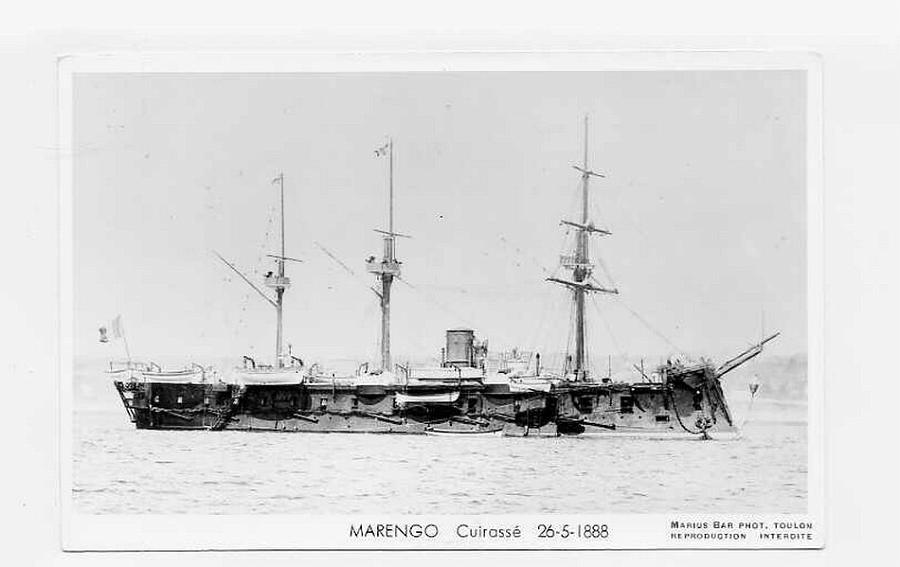
Marengo on 26 May 1888

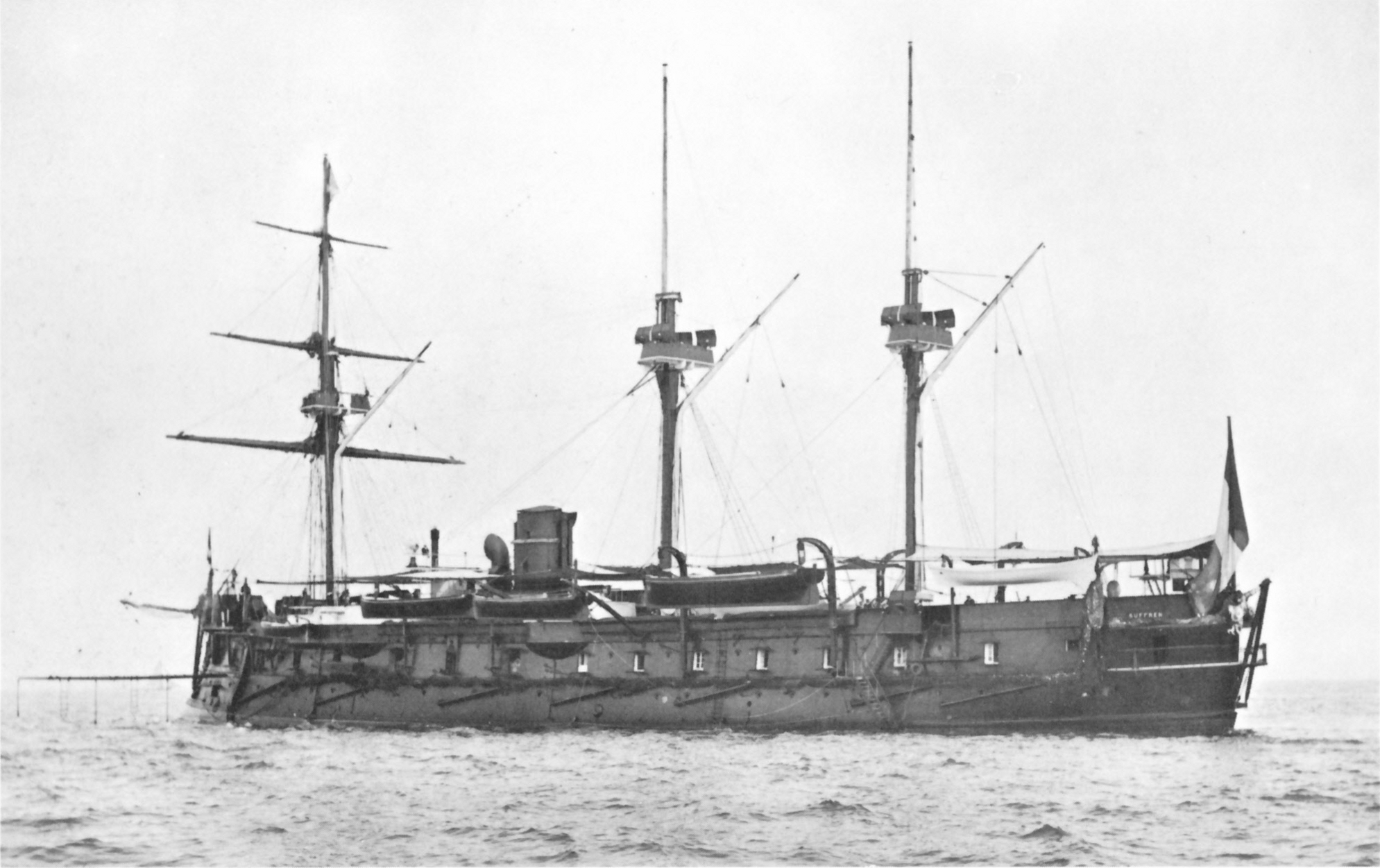
Suffren circa 1875

== Ships ==
Construction data
Ship	Builder	Laid down	Launched	Commissioned	Fate
Océan	Arsenal de Brest	July 1865	15 October 1868	21 July 1870	Condemned, 1894
Marengo	Arsenal de Toulon	July 1865	4 December 1869	May 1872	Condemned, 1896
Suffren	Arsenal de Cherbourg	July 1866	26 December 1872	1 March 1876	Condemned, 1897

== Initial cost ==
The American, Chief Engineer James Wilson King, gave the cost of each ship as $1,302,000 for the hull and machinery excluding armament, rigging and first outfit of stores, and $260,680 for machinery alone. Thomas Brassey gave the cost of the Marengo as £280,000, and the Suffren as £260,400.

== Service ==
During the Franco-Prussian War of 1870–71 Océan was assigned to the Northern Squadron that attempted to blockade Prussian ports on the Baltic until recalled on 16 September 1870 and ordered to return to Cherbourg. Afterward she was assigned to the Evolutionary Squadron until 1875 when she was placed in reserve. Océan was recommissioned in 1879 for service with the Mediterranean Squadron. She had a lengthy refit in 1884–85 and was assigned to the Northern Squadron after it was completed. Around 1888 the ship was transferred back to the Mediterranean Squadron until she was reduced to reserve around 1891. Océan was assigned to the Gunnery School that same year and later became a training ship for naval apprentices before being condemned in 1894.

Marengo was running her sea trials when the Franco-Prussian War began and was immediately put in reserve. She was recommissioned in 1872 for service with the Mediterranean Squadron until 1876 when she was again placed in reserve. On 2 October 1880 the ship was recommissioned and assigned to the Mediterranean Squadron. Marengo was transferred to the Levant Squadron (French: Division Navale du Levant) on 13 February 1881 and bombarded the Tunisian port of Sfax in July 1881 as part of the French conquest of Tunisia. She remained in the Mediterranean until she was assigned to the Reserve Squadron in 1886. In 1888 Marengo became the flagship of the Northern Squadron and led the squadron during its port visit to Kronstadt in 1891. She was reduced to reserve the following year and sold in 1896.

Suffren was placed into reserve after she completed her sea trials and was not commissioned until 1 March 1876 when she became flagship of the Cherbourg Division. Throughout her career the ship was often used as a flagship because of her spacious admiral's quarters. On 1 September 1880 the ship was assigned to the division that participated in the international naval demonstration at Ragusa later that month under the command of Vice Admiral Seymour of the Royal Navy in an attempt to force the Ottoman Empire to comply with the terms of the Treaty of Berlin and turn over the town of Ulcinj to Montenegro. Suffren was reduced to reserve in 1881 and not recommissioned until 23 August 1884 when she was assigned to the Northern Squadron. The ship was transferred to the Mediterranean Squadron about 1888 and remained there until paid off in 1895 and condemned in 1897.
