= List of longest wooden ships =

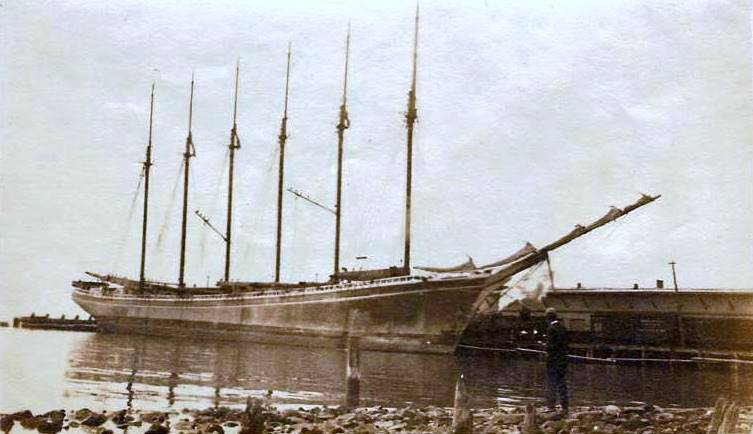
The six-masted schooner Wyoming, the longest confirmed wooden ship in history.

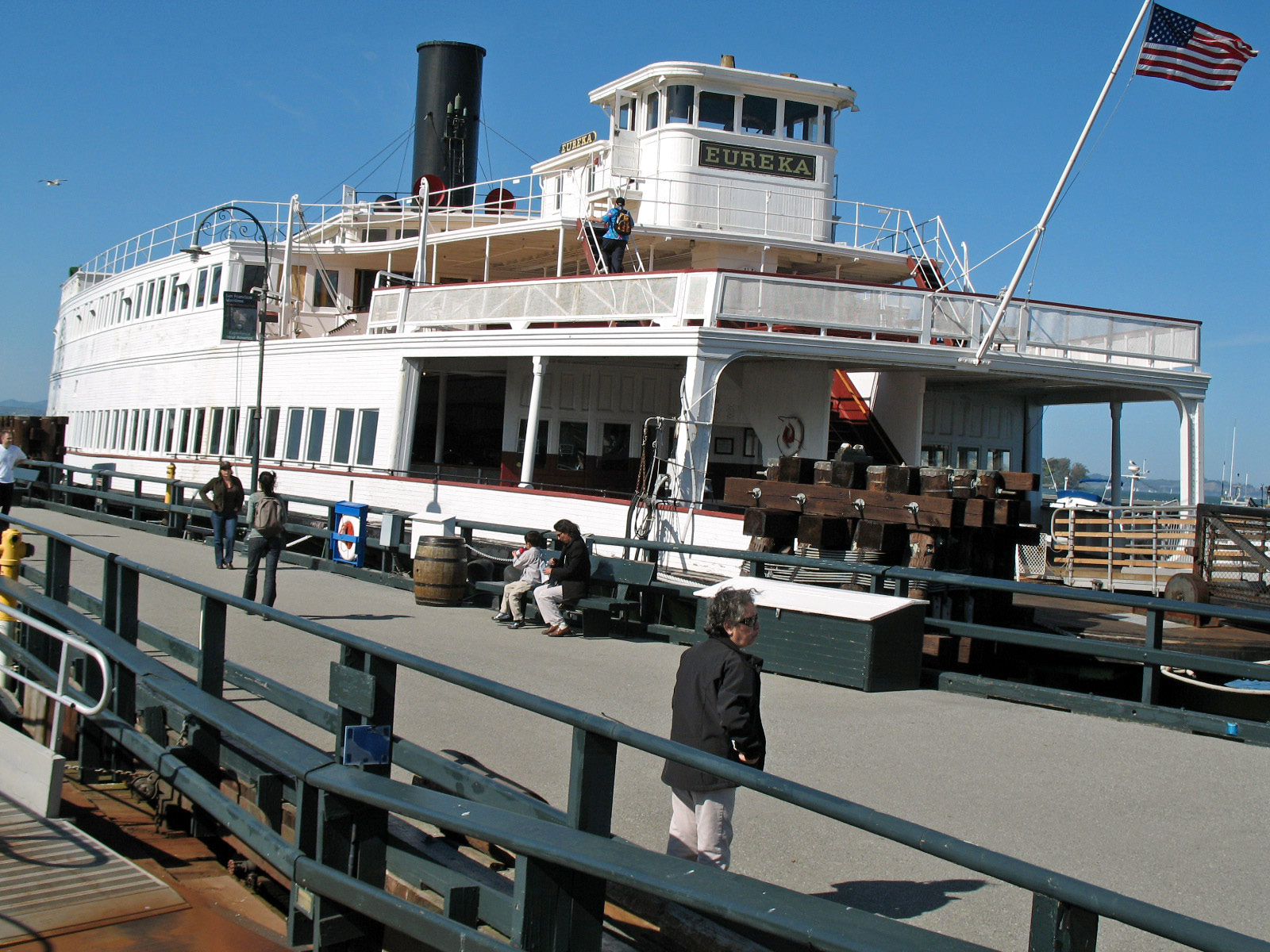
The side-wheel paddle steamer ferryboat Eureka, now a museum ship, is the longest wooden ship still afloat.

This is a list of the world's longest wooden ships. The vessels are sorted by ship length including bowsprit, if known.

Finding the world's longest wooden ship is not straightforward since there are several contenders, depending on which definitions are used. For example, some of these ships benefited from substantial iron or even steel components since the flexing of wood members can lead to significant leaking as the wood members become longer. Some of these ships were not very seaworthy, and a few sank either immediately after launch or soon thereafter. Some of the more recent large ships were never able or intended to leave their berths, and function as floating museums. Finally, not all of the claims to the title of the world's longest wooden ship are credible or verifiable.

A further problem is that especially wooden ships have more than one "length". The most used measure in length for registering a ship is the "length of the topmost deck"—the "length on deck" (LOD)—'measured from leading edge of stem post to trailing edge of stern post on deck level' or the "length between perpendiculars" (LPP, LBP)—'measured from leading edge of stem post to trailing edge of stern post in the construction waterline (CWL)'. In this method of measuring bowsprit including jibboom and out-board part of spanker boom if any have both no effect on the ship's length. The longest length for comparing ships, the total "overall" length (LOA) based on sparred length, should be given if known.

The longest wooden ship ever built, the six-masted New England gaff schooner Wyoming, had a "total length" of 137 metres (449 ft) (measured from tip of jibboom (30 metres) to tip of spanker boom (27 metres) and a "length on deck" of 107 m (351 ft). The 30 m (98 ft)-difference is due to her extremely long jibboom of 30 m (98 ft) her out-board length being 27 m (89 ft).

== Longest known wooden ships ==
=== Over 100 meters (328 feet) ===
Length	Beam	Name	Service	Fate	Notes
140 m (450 ft)	15.3 m (50 ft 1 in)	(United States) Wyoming	1909–1924	sunk	This ship had a tendency to flex in heavy seas, causing the planks to twist and buckle due to their extreme length despite being fitted with metal bracing. Water was evacuated nearly constantly by steam pumps. It foundered in heavy seas with loss of all hands.
130 m (425 ft)	35 m (116 ft)	(United States) Solano	1878–1931	scuttled	A paddle steamer used to ferry passengers and trains across the Carquinez Strait between Benicia and Port Costa, California. At the time of its construction, it was the largest ferryboat ever built. Unlike its later sister, the Contra Costa which had a steel hull, the wooden-hulled Solano had tall masts in the center of mass ("hogposts") anchoring several wires ("guys") that strengthened the hull against the weight of the trains. The ferries were scuttled after the completion of the Benicia-Martinez railroad bridge.
115.0 m (377.3 ft)	22.2 m (72.8 ft)	USS Dunderberg (later (France) Rochambeau)	1865–1874	broken up 1874	Ironclad built in New York City, originally intended for the United States Navy during the American Civil War, but eventually sold to the French Navy. About 50 feet (15 m) of her length was a ram. She was not particularly stable or seaworthy and only made one oceanic voyage to reach her new owners.
108 m (356 ft)	15.4 m (50 ft)	Columbus	1824–1825	sunk	First timber ship or disposable ship with a four-masted barque rigging. Built in Quebec to avoid taxes on timber, her cargo and components were intended to be sold after the ship's arrival in London; however, the owner had only the cargo sold and ordered the ship back for a second voyage with a timber cargo; the ship broke apart and sunk in the English Channel.
108 m (354 ft)	15.4 m (50 ft)	(United States) Adriatic	1857–1885	beached and abandoned in 1885	SS Adriatic was the largest passenger ship in the world when she was launched. She displaced 5,233 tons at her design draft of 20 feet (6.1 m). Her hull was constructed of live and white oak, reinforced with iron strapping 5 inches (13 cm) wide and .875 inches (2.22 cm) thick. It was divided into eight watertight compartments, with bulkheads 6 inches (15 cm) thick between them. She was built for the Collins Line, but only did one roundtrip before that firm failed, partly because of Adriatic's high cost.
105.8 m (347 ft)	15.2 m (50 ft)	(United States) Eleanor A. Percy	1900–1919	sunk	Six-masted schooner with hull measuring 323.5 feet and 347 feet including the bowsprit, that foundered off Ireland on December 26, 1919.
103 m (338 ft)	13.4 m (44 ft)	(United States) Pretoria	1900–1905	sunk	A barge built for use on the Great Lakes. To strengthen the wooden frame and hull, steel keelson plates, chords, and arches were included, and was also diagonally strapped with steel. A donkey engine powered a pump to keep the interior dry.
102.1 m (335 ft)	16.2 m (53 ft)	(United States) Great Republic (later Denmark)	1853–1872	sunk	The largest wooden clipper ship ever built. It used iron bolts and was reinforced with steel, including ninety 36-foot (11 m) 4x1-inch cross braces, and metal keelsons. The MIT Museum noted that "With this behemoth, McKay had pushed wooden ship construction to its practical limits." The ship was abandoned leaking after encountering a hurricane near Bermuda.
102.1 m (335 ft)	18.3 m (60 ft)	HMS Orlando; HMS Mersey	1858–1871, 1858–1875 respectively	broken up	Sister British warships that suffered structural problems due to their length despite having internal iron strapping to support the hull.
102.1 m (335 ft)	17.7 m (58 ft 1 in)	(France) Trident	1878–1909	scrapped	The largest Colbert-class ironclad of the French Navy's Mediterranean Squadron. It saw action at the French conquest of Tunisia
102 m (335 ft)	15 m	(Canada) William D. Lawrence (later Kommandør Svend Foyn)	1874–1891	sunk	Largest wooden cargo ship ever built in Canada. It passed to Norwegian ownership in 1883 and was converted into a barge in 1891. Sank while under tow at Dakar.
101.7 m (333 ft 8 in)	17.4 m (57 ft 1 in)	(France) Richelieu	1873–1911	scrapped	A wooden-hulled central battery ironclad that served in the French Navy's Mediterranean Squadron.
101.1 m (331 ft 8 in)	17.4 m (57 ft 1 in)	(France) Colbert	1877–1909	scrapped	Lead ship of the Colbert-class ironclads and part of the French Navy's Mediterranean Squadron. It saw action at the French conquest of Tunisia.

=== 100–90 meters (328–295 feet) ===
Length	Beam	Name	Service	Fate	Notes
100 m (328.084 ft)	6 m (50 ft 1 in)	(Russia) Belyana type ships	16th–20th century	disassembled	Belyanas were Russian freshwater ships used for log driving on the Volga and Vetluga rivers. Their bottom was made from fir and sidings from pine and featured a complement of 60 to 80 workers. The largest Belyanas could transport up to 13,000,000 kilograms (29,000,000 lb) of logs all stacked on their deck in the form of an inverted pyramid.
98.8 m (324 ft)	15.0 m (46 ft)	(United States) Santiago	1899–1918	sunk	A schooner-barge on the Great Lakes, towed by Appomattox until 1905 and then the steamer John F. Morrow until 1918.
97.5 m (320 ft)	15.2 m (50 ft)	(United States) Edward J. Lawrence	1908–1925	sunk	Six-masted schooner sunk in 1925 after fire while moored off Portland, Maine.
97.84 m (311 ft)	15.0 m (49 ft)	(United States) Roanoke	1892–1905	burned, then sunk	A huge four-masted barque with skysails of a total length of 360 ft (110 m) and 3,539 GRT. In 1905 she was under the command of Captain Jabez A. Amesbury when she caught fire while loading at the anchorage of Noumea and burned to the waterline. This ship used iron bolts and steel reinforcements.
97.2 m (319 ft)	12.8 m (42 ft)	(United States) Appomattox	1896–1905	run aground and sunk	A Great Lakes steamship capable of carrying 3,000 tons of bulk cargo. Built with metallic cross bracing, keelson plates, and multiple arches because of her extreme length. Several syphons and steam-driven pumps were required to keep her afloat. Towed the steamer barge Santiago.
95.1 m	21.03 m	Caligula's giant ship	c. 37 AD	reused as foundation of lighthouse	Traces of this Roman barge were found during the construction of Leonardo da Vinci International Airport at Fiumicino, Italy, just north of the ancient port of Ostia. According to Pliny, this or a similar ship was used to transport the obelisk in St. Peter's Square from Egypt on the orders of Emperor Caligula.
95 m (312 ft)	12 m (41 ft)	(United States) L.R. Doty	1893–1898	wrecked	A lake freighter that sank on Lake Michigan with the loss of all hands. Her wreck was located in 2010.
95 m (312 ft)	12 m (41 ft)	(United States) Iosco	1891–1905	sunk	A lake freighter that sank on September 2, 1905, on Lake Superior with the loss of all hands.
94.8 m (311 ft)	unknown	Derzhava	1871–1905	decommissioned	A steam-propelled yacht for personal use of the Russian Imperial Family in the Baltic Sea.
92.7 m (304 ft)	18.6 m (61 ft)	Baron of Renfrew	1825	stranded and broken apart	This unseaworthy British ship was a disposable ship. Created to avoid taxes on timber, she was built of components intended to be sold after the ship's arrival from Quebec to London. The ship stranded on the Goodwin Sands and broke apart while being towed with a pilot aboard. Parts of her timber were found on the French coast. The ship had 5,294 GRT and an overall length of 362 ft (110 metres).
91.7 m (301 ft)	13.0 m (42.5 ft)	(United States) Frank O'Connor (Note: Originally known as City of Naples, she was one of three sister ships (the others being City of Venice and City of Genoa).)	1892–1919	burned	A steam screw operating on the Great Lakes, it required an innovative iron and steel-reinforced hull to be a viable vessel.
91.4 m (300 ft 4 in)	17.1 m (56 ft 5)	HMS Bellerophon	1865–1923	sold for scrap	A Royal Navy central battery ironclad. It served in the Channel Fleet and North America.
91.3 m (300 ft)	15.0 m (49 ft)	(United States) Shenandoah	1890–1915	accidentally rammed and sunk	Another huge four-masted barque of the fleet of Arthur Sewell & Co. of Bath, Maine, with double top-sails, single topgallant sails, royal and sky sails of a total length of 360 ft (110 m) and 3,406.78 GRT. It was rammed by the steamer Powhattan near Fire Island, Long Island, New York in 1915.
91.1 m (299 ft)	23.7 m (78 ft) (Note: Her round-bottomed hull is 42 feet (12.7 m) wide by 277 feet (83.9 m) long. The house rests on a platform extending 18 feet (5.5 m) from the hull on either side.)	(United States) Eureka	1890–1957	museum ship	A steamboat with twin, 27-foot paddlewheels that carried railcars, cars and passengers across San Francisco Bay. Currently a National Historic Landmark at the San Francisco Maritime National Historical Park, and the longest wooden ship that is still afloat.
91 m (300 ft)	13 m (42 ft)	(Qing dynasty) Haian (Qing dynasty) Yuyuen	1872–? 1873–1885 (respectively)	hulked and scrapped sunk (respectively)	Twin steam-powered frigates of the Imperial Chinese Navy, and the largest vessels built in China until the 1930s. Yuyuen was sunk in action during the Sino-French War; Haian survived, but was hulked after being used as a blockship in the same war, and was scrapped years later.

=== 89–80 meters (291–262 feet) ===
Length	Beam	Name	Service	Fate	Notes
89.5 m (283 ft 8 in)	17.3 m (56 ft 9 in)	(Spain) Sagunto (also (Spain) Amadeo I)	1869–1896	hulked and broken up	Designed as a 100-gun screw-propelled frigate but turned into an armored frigate during construction. The hull was wooden but fully covered by iron plates. Turned into a hulk in 1887.
87 m (284 ft)	13 m (42 ft)	(Portugal) Dom Fernando II e Glória	1845–1940	museum ship	A 50-gun frigate of the Portuguese Navy. It became a training ship in 1865 and was permanently moored at Lisbon after 1878. Despite this, it was named the flagship of Portugal's European squadron in 1938. Two years later it became a naval school and museum ship. It is currently displayed in Almada.
87 m (285 ft)	12 m (29 ft)	(United States) Australasia	1884–1896	burned	A steamship that burned down on Lake Michigan.
86.8 m (287 ft)	15.0 m (49 ft)	(United States) Rappahannock	1889–1891	burned	A three-masted wooden full-rigged ship of 3,054 GRT, built and owned by Arthur Sewall & Co., with double top-sails and topgallant sails, royal and sky sails of a total length of 347 ft (106 m). The ship burned down near Juan Fernández while transporting soft charcoal from Liverpool to San Francisco, but everyone aboard reached Robinson Crusoe island, where they were rescued.
85.4 m (280 ft 2 in)	16.6 m (54 ft 6 in)	(Spain) Zaragoza	1867–1899	scuttled	A Spanish armored frigate built in Cartagena with a wooden hull covered by iron plates. Became a torpedo training ship in 1892.
85.34 m (280 ft)	10.97 m (36 ft)	Cutty Sark (Note: Also Ferreira and Maria do Amparo)	1869–1954	museum ship	Built as one of the last and fastest clippers for the tea trade with China, it switched to transporting wool from Australia after the Suez Canal was built. It was sold to a Portuguese company and used as a cargo ship between 1895 and 1922, when it was reacquired by British citizens and eventually restored for exhibition.
85.3 m (280 ft)	18 m (58 ft 11 in)	HMS Lord Clyde; HMS Lord Warden	1864–1875; 1865–1889 (respectively)	run aground and sold for scrap broken up (respectively)	Sister ships reputed at once to be the heaviest wooden ships ever built, the fastest steaming wooden ships, and the slowest-sailing ironclads in the Royal Navy. Both served in the Channel Fleet and the Mediterranean Squadron. Lord Clyde was plagued with engineering problems and was sold for scrap after it run aground and its hull was found to be rotten. Lord Warden had a more distinguished career, serving in the Reserve at the Firth of Forth after leaving the Mediterranean.
85.3 m (280 ft)	15.9 m (52 ft 2 in)	(Spain) Arapiles	1868–1883	broken up	A Spanish ironclad with a wooden hull covered entirely by iron plates. It served mostly in the Caribbean.
85.3 m (280 ft)	15.2 m (50 ft)	HMS Galatea	1859–1883	broken up	A 26-gun sixth-rate screw frigate of the Royal Navy's North America and West Indies Station.
85.1 m (279 ft 1 in)	17 m (55 ft 9 in)	(Spain) Tetuán	1863–1874	burned and sunk	First armored frigate built in Spain, in the Ferrol royal shipyard, with a wooden hull covered by iron plates. She burned as a result of sabotage during the Cantonal Revolution.
83.7 m (274.6 ft)	18.5 m (60.7 ft)	(Kuwait) Al-Hashemi-II	2001–	museum and restaurant	A Kuwaiti non-seagoing model of a dhow, reputed to be the largest ever built.
83.4 m (274 ft)	13.7 m (45 ft)	(United States) Susquehanna	1891–1905	sunk	The third hugest four-masted wooden barque of the fleet of Arthur Sewell & Co. with double top-sails, single topgallant sails, royal and sky sails of 2,745 GRT. Lost in a heavy storm three days after leaving Nouméa, New Caledonia, for Delaware with a cargo of 3,558 tons of nickel ore. This ship used also iron bolts and steel reinforcements.
81.2 m	10.9 m	Livadia	1873–1878	run aground and sunk	A steam-propelled yacht for personal use of the Russian Imperial Family in the Black Sea. It sank at night, due to unruly weather, but without loss of life or cargo.
81.0 m (266 ft)	18.08 m (59.3 ft)	(France) Bretagne	1855–1880	broken up	A 130-gun three-decker ship of the line, built as an improvement over the successful Océan class. It was equipped with an 8-boiler steam engine and a propeller that could be retracted to streamline the hull when sailing under sail only. It saw action during the Crimean War, and was used as a school ship after 1866.
80.9 m (265.3 ft)	13.4 m (44.1 ft)	(Canada) Morning Light (later (German Empire) Jacob Fritz)	1856–1889	wrecked	Largest vessel in British North America at the time of its construction. Sold to a German company in 1881, and found wrecked and abandoned north of New Jersey, in 1889.

=== 79–70 meters (259–230 feet) ===
Length	Beam	Name	Service	Fate	Notes
79.2 m (260 ft)	18.3 m (60 ft)	HMS Victoria; HMS Howe	1859–1893; 1860–1921 (respectively)	both scrapped	Sister 121-gun ships that were the last commissioned three-deckers ships of the line of the Royal Navy. The hulls were strapped with diagonal iron riders for extra stability, and they combined sail propulsion with a two-funnel marine steam engine that made them among the fastest ships of the line ever built.
78.3 m (256.9 ft)	14.5 m (47.6 ft)	Adler von Lübeck	1567–1588	disassembled	Built in Lübeck to serve as the main fighting ship of the Hanseatic League. This galleon featured 138 guns, and space for 650 marines and a 350-man-strong crew. She was the largest ship of her time.
78.22 m (256 ft 8 in)	17 m (55 ft 9 in)	(France) Gloire	1859–1883	scrapped	First ocean-going ironclad, developed in response to the use of explosive shells in the Crimean War.
78 m (257 ft)	14 m (45 ft)	Canada	1891–1926	broken up	A full-rigged ship intended to be the largest wooden ship built in Canada, but the hull had to be shortened after the keel's timber was damaged during construction. It transported cargo between South America and Australia, and between the United States and Canada, during her career.
77.9 m (255 ft 6 in)	18.3 m (60 ft)	HMS Algiers	1854–1870	broken up	A screw-propelled, 91-gun second rate ship of the line of the Royal Navy, launched after several changes in design since first conceived in 1839. Saw action at the Crimean War before being transferred to Malta and British home waters.
77.8 m (255 ft 3 in)	17 m (55 ft 9 in)	(France) Napoléon	1850–1876	struck	A 90-gun ship of the line of the French Navy, the first purpose-built steam battleship in the world, and the first screw battleship. Its design was used as a basis for the slightly smaller Algésiras and Ville de Nantes classes.
76.8 m (252 ft)	18.3 m (60 ft 2 in)	HMS Prince of Wales (later HMS Britannia)	1860–1917	hulked and broken up	A 121-gun screw-propelled first-rate three-decker line-of-battle ship of the Royal Navy. Renamed in 1869 and hulked in 1909.
76.8 m (252 ft)	13.9 m 45.6 ft	(United States) Sovereign of the Seas	1852–1859	wrecked	This clipper is the fastest sailing ship ever built, recording an unbeaten 22 knots (41 km/h; 25 mph) in 1854. It wrecked on the Strait of Malacca while covering the route between Hamburg and China.
76.15 m (249.8 ft)	21.22 (69.6 ft)	(Ottoman Empire) Mahmudiye	1829–1874	disassembled	Ordered by Sultan Mahmud II and built by the Ottoman Imperial Naval Arsenal on the Golden Horn in Constantinople. It was the largest warship in the world for several years. The ship-of-the-line that was 76 m (249 ft) long with a beam of 21 m (69 ft), was armed with 128 cannon on three decks with complement of 1,280. She participated in many naval battles, including the Siege of Sevastopol (1854–1855) during the Crimean War.
75.66 m (248 ft 3 in)	16.5 m (54 ft 2 in)	SMS Danzig (1851) (later Kaiten Maru)	1853–1869	burned	
75 m (245 ft)	12 m (40 ft)	SS British Queen (later (Belgium) British Queen)	1839–1844	scrapped	A paddle steamer that was the second steamship built for the trans-Atlantic route and the largest passenger liner at the time it was built. It passed to Belgian ownership after the British and American Steam Navigation Company collapsed on the wake of the loss of SS President.
74.68 m (245 ft)	unknown	HMS Atlas (later Atlas)	1860–1904	broken up	A 91-gun second rate ship of the line that was never completed and spent her entire career in reserve and later, as a civilian-owned hospital ship.
74.4 m (244 ft 1 in)	10.15 m (33.3 ft)	City of Adelaide (Note: Also HMS Carrick and Carrick)	1864–1948	museum ship	A clipper ship built to transport passengers and goods between Britain and Australia. In 1893 she became a floating hospital, and between 1923 and 1948 she served in the Royal Navy as a school ship, HMS Carrick. After being displayed in Scotland for decades, it was moved to its namesake Port Adelaide in 2014.
74 m (242 ft 9 in)	14.7 m (48 ft 3 in)	(France) Audacieuse	1856–1879	decommissioned	A mixed frigate of the French Navy active in the Second Opium War.
74 m (243 ft)	13.6 m (44.5 ft)	(Canada) County of Yarmouth	1884–?	unknown	A full-rigged ship built for trade with South America. It was dismasted and set to be broken up in 1895, but it was purchased in the last moment by the Argentinian Navy. Its later fate is unknown.
74 m (243 ft)	12 m (41 ft)	SS President	1840–1841	lost at sea	The largest passenger liner in the world, and the first steamship lost on the trans-Atlantic route when it disappeared on its third voyage with all 136 people on board. Although one meter shorter than British Queen overall, it had 25% more capacity and an additional deck that made it top heavy, slow, and under-powered in rough weather.
74 m (242 ft)	11 m (37 ft)	(United States) George Spencer	1884–1905	wrecked	A lake freighter built to carry iron ore on the Great Lakes. She wrecked in the infamous Mataafa Storm of 1905.
73.6 m (241.5 ft)	8.8 m (29 ft)	Keangsoo (later Kasuga)	1862–1902	scrapped	A paddle steamer commissioned in the Isle of Wight by Prince Gong of the Qing Dynasty for use in the Taiping Rebellion, but never delivered as the British crew refused to take orders from Chinese officers. Sold to the Satsuma Domain, she joined the Imperial Japanese Navy during the Boshin War.
73.3 m (240 ft 6 in)	19 m (62 ft)	HMS Royal Sovereign	1857–1885	broken up	Designed as a 121-gun first rate ship of the line but modified to a 131-gun screw ship during construction. In 1862, she was razed and further converted to an experimental armored turret ship for coastal defence, the first built in Britain as well as the smallest and only with a wooden hull.
73.2 m (240 ft)	16.9 m (55 ft 4 in)	HMS Conqueror; HMS Donegal (later HMS Vernon)	1855–1861; 1858–1925 (respectively)	wrecked hulked, then scrapped (respectively)	Sister 101-gun screw-propelled, first rate ships of the line of the Royal Navy. Conqueror was wrecked in the Bahamas while carrying troops to the French Intervention in Mexico, but all aboard could be saved. Donegal served in Mexico, Liverpool and China until 1886, when it was hulked and merged into the Torpedo School at Portsmouth under the name Vernon. Scrapped in 1926, some of her timbers were used to build the Prince of Wales public house in Brighouse.
73.2 m (249.8 ft)	11 m (36 ft)	(Scotland) Great Michael (later Grande Nef d'Ecosse)	1512–?	unknown	Michael, the flagship of the Royal Scots Navy, ordered by James IV of Scotland, and built at Newhaven, Edinburgh. Nicknamed Great Michael, she was sold to France following the Scottish defeat at the Battle of Flodden.
73 m (240 ft)	24 m (79 ft)	Second Nemi ship	1st century AD	sunk, then burned	Believed to have been used as a pleasure barge or floating palace by Caligula. Its remains were recovered from Lake Nemi in 1929 and housed in a Roman museum until they were destroyed in World War II.
73 m (238 ft)	16.87 m (55 ft 4 in)	HMS St Jean d'Acre	1853–1875	broken up	First 101-gun screw two-decker ship of the line of the Royal Navy. This experimental ship recycled materials from an 1844 copy of HMS Albion that was never completed and incorporated new designs made for the 1854 HMS James Watt. It later served as inspiration for the slightly longer HMS Conqueror. Saw action at the Crimean War.
72.2 m (236 ft 11 in)	13.04 m (42 ft 9 in)	Japanese frigate Kaiyō Maru	1865–1868	wrecked	
72 m (236 ft 2 in)	15 m (49 ft 3 in)	(Spain) Lealtad class	1860–1897	varied	Three sister steam and sail-powered armored frigates with wooden hulls that served in the French Intervention in Mexico, the Chincha Islands War and the Cantonal Revolution.
71.9 m (236 ft)	10.7 m (35.1 ft)	Great Western	1837–1856	disassembled	A steamship designed by Isambard Kingdom Brunel for regular transatlantic steam "packet boat" service. In addition to the paddle wheels, she carried four masts for supplementary propulsion and stability.
71.7 m (235 ft 3 in)	16.8 m (55 ft 1 in)	(France) Ville de Nantes class	1862–1894	all broken up	90-gun ship of the line class of the French Navy, powered both by sail and steam power.
71.5 m (234.6 ft)	14.8 m (48.5 ft)	Sovereign of the Seas (later HMS Royal Sovereign)	1637–1696	burned	A prestige flagship of the English Royal Navy, designed as a 90-gun first-rate ship of the line but launched with 102 guns at the insistence of Charles I. Her most extravagant decoration earned her the nickname of "Golden Devil". After serving in the Anglo-Dutch Wars and the War of the Grand Alliance, she was permanently moored at Chatham until she burned by accident.
71.46 m (234 ft 5 in)	16.86 m (55 ft 4 in)	(France) Algésiras class	1855–1921	varied	90-gun ship of the line class of the French Navy, powered both by sail and steam power.
71 m (233 ft)	13.5 m (44 ft)	Jylland	1860–1908	museum ship	A screw-propelled steam frigate of the Royal Danish Navy, it saw action at the Battle of Heligoland (1864). Currently preserved in Ebeltoft.
70.18 m (230 ft 3 in)	16.87 m (55 ft 4 in)	HMS Agamemnon; HMS Victor Emmanuel	1852–1870; 1855–1899?	broken up unknown	91-gun Royal Navy steam battleships ordered in response to the French Napoléon. Agamemnon was one of two ships used to lay the first Transatlantic telegraph cable in 1858. Victor Emmanuel served in the English Channel, Mediterranean and Africa during the Anglo-Ashanti wars before it was stationed as a hospital and receiving ship in Hong Kong, in 1873. Agamemnon was broken up in 1870 and Victor Emmanuel was sold out in 1899.
70 m (230 ft)	20 m (66 ft)	First Nemi ship	1st century AD	sunk, then burned	A slightly smaller ship discovered in Lake Nemi and built around the same time as the second ship; its purpose is unknown. Also destroyed in World War II.

=== 69–60 meters (226–197 feet) ===
Length	Beam	Name	Service	Fate	Notes
69 m (226 ft)	15.7 m (51 ft 10 in)	HMS Victory	1765–	still in commission, but not for active service; effectively museum ship	A 104-gun ship of the line of the Royal Navy. Oldest naval ship still in commission and the only remaining ship of the line. Currently in dry dock at Portsmouth as a museum ship. It is the flagship of the First Sea Lord.
69 m (226 ft) (estimated)	11.7 m (38 ft)	Vasa	1628	sunk, later museum ship	A warship sunk on her maiden voyage when a gale forced water onto the ship; she fell over on her port side and sank. The ship was well preserved and recovered relatively intact in 1961. She is now in the Vasa Museum in Stockholm, Sweden. Her sparred length is estimated at 69 meters, but her measured deck length (between perpendiculars) is 47.5 meters (155.8 ft).
67.97 m (233 ft)	11.95 m (39.2 ft)	(Canada) Joseph H. Scammell	1884–1891	wrecked	A cargo ship wrecked and looted by locals off the coast of Torquay, Australia.
67.24 m (220.6 ft)	18.9 m (62 ft)	Doce Apóstoles class	1753–1806	varied	Twelve Spanish sister ships of the line built in the Ferrol royal shipyards under supervision of the Marquis of Ensenada and nicknamed "the Twelve Apostles". They had between 68 and 74 guns each.
67 m (220 ft)	18.54 m (60 ft 10 in)	Royal Albert	1854–1884	broken up	A 121-gun three-decker of the Royal Navy, designed as sail-powered only but converted to screw propulsion during construction.
67 m (219 ft)	11 m (36 ft)	(United States) C.A. Thayer	1895–	museum ship	One of the last schooners of the West Coast lumber trade, currently exhibited at the San Francisco Maritime National Historical Park.
67–63 m (219–207 ft)	11–10 m (35–34 ft)	Britannia class	1840–1880	varied	Wooden paddlers that were the first fleet of the Cunard Line and the first year round scheduled Atlantic steamship service, with a capacity for 115 passengers. Most units were sold to different European navies in 1849–1850.
66.42 m (218 ft)	17.67 m (58 ft)	(Spain) Reina Doña Isabel II (Spain) Rey Don Francisco de Asís	1852–1889; 1853–1866 (respectively)	sunk, then broken up decommissioned (respectively)	Twin sister ships of the line, the last built in Spain. Isabel II served in Mexico and Morocco before becoming a school ship in 1860, a hulk in 1870, and a prison ship in 1873; she sunk in 1889 but was salvaged and broken up. Francisco de Asís saw little use due to being considered obsolete at the time of construction.
66 m (216 ft 7.5 in)	18.3 m (60 ft)	HMS Queen	1839–1871	broken up	110-gun first-rate ship of the line and last purely sailing battleship built by the Royal Navy; all subsequent ones were also fitted with a steam engine. Refitted and converted to screw propulsion in 1859.
66 m (218 ft)	15 m (50 ft)	(England) Grace Dieu	1420–1439	burned	An English carrack used as King Henry V's flagship. She burned after being hit by lightning.
66 m (217 ft)	Unknown	HMS Princess Royal	1853–1872	broken up	91-gun second-rate ship of the line of the Royal Navy. Served in the Baltic campaign of the Crimean War and afterward in the East Indies and China Station.
65.9 m (216.2 ft)	13 m (43 ft)	(Canada) Hamburg	1886–1925	beached, later burned	A three-masted barque. The beached ship burned to the waterline in 1936, but the lower hull was buried and preserved in river silt.
65.18 m (213.8 ft)	16.24 m (53.3 ft)	(France) Océan class	1788–1905	varied	118-gun three-decker ships of the line, built by the French Navy between 1788 and 1854.
65 m (213.2 ft)	10.6 m	Tenacious	2000–	still operational	A ship designed for the disabled.
65 m (213 ft)	11.24 m (50 ft 1 in)	(France) Hermione	2014–	still operational	Named after the 1779 French frigate but built following the plans of the 1783 British frigate HMS Concorde, both smaller. Construction started in 1995 and used mostly traditional tools and techniques.
64.9 m (212 ft 11 in)	15.1 m (49 ft 6 in)	Kong Sverre	1860–1932	scrapped	A steam and sail powered frigate of the Royal Norwegian Navy originally planned to be "Europe's Horror", the most technologically advanced warship in the world. However, after several delays in construction, it was found already obsolete at the time of launch and it spent most of its career in storage at a harbor. It was a school ship between 1894 and 1918, when it was put again in storage due to poor maintenance, and was never fit for service again.
64.05 m (210.1 ft)	18.11 m (59.4 ft)	(France) Valmy	1847–1891	scrapped	Largest three-decker of the French Navy and largest tall ship ever built in France. Unlike other sail ships of its time, it was never modified for steam power despite being difficult to manoeuvre, and often had to be towed by smaller steam ships during its service in the Crimean War. It was turned into a school ship in 1864.
64 m (210.0 ft)	17.3 m	USS Pennsylvania	1837–1861	burned to prevent capture	Largest and most heavily armed American wooden sailing warship. It mounted 120 guns and made only one voyage. After being laid up at the Norfolk Navy Yard for several years, it was burned to prevent its capture by the Confederates at the start of the American Civil War.
64 m (210.0 ft)	11.94 m (39.2 ft)	(Canada) Calburga (later HCMS Calburga)	1890–1915	sunk	The last Canadian square-rigger barque of large tonnage, built for trade with South America and Britain. It was made of spruce but fastened with copper and iron. Converted to a transport ship in World War I and sunk during a storm off the coast of Wales in 1915.
63.16 m (207 ft 3 in)	10.84 m (35 ft 7 in)	Walther von Ledebur (later Mühlhausen)	1966–2007	decommissioned	Built as a prototype for a new German Navy class of ocean-going minesweepers with an all-glued laminated timber hull that never entered production. It served as a trials ship until 1994, when it was rebuilt as a training and support vessel for mine-clearing divers, renamed and recommissioned in this capacity.
62.6 m (205 ft 6 in)	16.6 m 54 ft 5 in	Caledonia class	1808–1918	varied	120-gun first rate ships of the line. Originally sail-powered, they were all converted to steam in the 1850s.
62.6 m (205 ft 6 in)	16.6 m 54 ft 5 in	Rodney class	1833–1956	varied	Three 90-gun second rate ships of the line. They were among the last unarmored ships of the Royal Navy to be in full commission.
62.6 m (205 ft 6 in)	16.59 m 54 ft 5 in	Albion class	1842–1905	all broken up	Three 90-gun second rate ships of the line. Originally sail-powered, they were all converted to steam in the 1850s.
62.5 m (205 ft 1 in)	16.2 m 53 ft 2 in	(France) Hercule class	1836–1908	varied	100-gun ships of the line of the French Navy. The first were sail powered only; later units were converted to steam, and the last one was built with an engine.
62.2 m (204.0 ft)	13.3 m	USS Constitution	1797–	still in commission, but not for active service	The second-oldest commissioned warship (after the Royal Navy's HMS Victory) in the world and the oldest wooden ship still sailing.
62 m (204 ft)	18 m (60 ft)	HMS Windsor Castle (later HMS Cambridge)	1858–1908	broken up	A 102-gun first-rate triple-decker of the Royal Navy. Served as a gunnery ship off Plymouth after 1869.
62 m (205 ft)	16.3 m (53 ft 6 in)	Nelson class	1814–1928	all broken up	120-gun first rate ships of the line of the Royal Navy. All three units built were sail-powered only originally, though the first (HMS Nelson) was given a steam engine in 1860.
61.81 m (202.79 ft)	17.17 m (56.3 ft)	(Spain) América	1766–1823	broken up	A Spanish 64-gun ship of the line built in Havana that served in the Spanish–Portuguese War (1776–77), American Revolutionary War, French Revolutionary Wars and Napoleonic Wars.
61.72 m (202.5 ft)	16.73 m (54.9 ft)	Royal Louis	1758–1773	broken up	A 116-gun First-rate ship of the line of the French Royal Navy.
61.4 m (201.4 ft)	16.69 m (54.8 ft)	(France) Duquesne (France) Tourville	1847–1887; 1853–1878	unknown scrapped (respectively)	Sister 90-gun sail and steam ships of the line that were used in the Crimean War and the French Intervention in Mexico. Later on, Duquesne was used as floating barracks, and Tourville as a prison ship for survivors of the Paris Commune.
61.3 m (201.1 ft)	16.2 m (53 ft)	(Spain) Santísima Trinidad	1769–1805	scuttled after capture	One of the few four-deckers ever built with 136 guns. Reputed to be the largest warship in the world until surpassed by the French Ócean class in the early 1790s. It sailed poorly and was nicknamed "The Ponderous" and "El Escorial of the Seas". Despite this, it saw extensive action in the American Revolutionary War and the Napoleonic Wars, even surviving and escaping successfully after being attacked by four warships and losing all her sails at the Battle of Cape St. Vincent. It was ultimately captured and scuttled after the Battle of Trafalgar. A non-seaworthy replica and a ship fit in its likeness (and thus not a true replica) exist in Alicante and Málaga, respectively.
61.06 m (200 ft 4 in)	10.8 m (35 ft 5 in)	Lammermuir	1864–1876	lost at sea	An extreme composite clipper, built to replace the ship of the same name wrecked the year before, which had been the favorite of the company owner, Jock Willis. Disappeared while sailing from Adelaide, Australia to London.
61 m (200 ft)	15.64 m (51.3 ft)	Soleil Royal	1670–1692	burned by fireships	Flagship of the French Western Squadron during the Nine Years' War. After sustaining great damage in the Battles of Barfleur and La Hougue, it docked at Cherbourg for repairs, where it was surprised and subsequently destroyed.
61 m (199 ft)	13 m (43 ft)	USS Constellation	1854–1955	museum ship	A sloop-of-war and the last sail-only warship designed and built by the US Navy. Some of her materials were salvaged from the smaller USS Constellation of 1797, which saw action at the Quasi-War, Barbary Wars and War of 1812. The second Constellation served in the American Civil War.
61 m (200 ft)	10 m (32.8 ft)	(Qing dynasty) Fu Po	1870–?	unknown	An armed transport of the Fujian Fleet active during the Sino-French War. It was hulked in 1890, but was refitted for service in 1893 as a response to piracy. Its later fate is unknown.
60.6 m (199 ft)	16.2 m (53 ft)	Terrible; Majestueux (later (France) Républicain)	1779–1804; 1780–c.1807 (respectively)	broken up decommissioned (respectively)	Sister 110-gun ships of the line.
60.5 m (198 ft)	16.28 m (53 ft)	(France) Suffren class	1829–1911	all broken up	A 90-gun ship of the line design of the French Navy, first to have straight walls instead of tumblehome. The heightened center of gravity was compensated with new underwater stabilisers. All units completed after 1840 were modified to have steam in addition to sail power.
60.42 m (198.2 ft)	16.24 m (53.3 ft)	Royal Louis (later Républicain)	1780–1794	wrecked	A 106-gun (elevated to 110 in 1786) ship of the line of the French Navy. Dismasted at the Glorious First of June (1792), it narrowly avoided capture and was restored to service. It was lost two years later during the Croisière du Grand Hiver.
60.42 m (198.2 ft)	16.24 m (53.3 ft)	(France) Commerce de Paris class	1804–1915	all broken up	110-gun ships of the line developed as a modification of the earlier Océan class. Only two (Commerce de Paris and Iéna) were completed before Napoleon's defeat and entered service; the others were dismantled in 1814 while still in the Antwerp shipyard.
60.4 m (198 ft)	14.9 m (49 ft)	Auguste (later Jacobin)	1779–1795	sunk	An 80-gun ship of the line active in the American and French revolutionary wars. Sunk during a storm along with most of her crew.
60.22 m (197 ft 7 in)	16.10 m (52 ft 10 in)	HMS Princess Charlotte; HMS Royal Adelaide	1825–? 1828–? (respectively)	unknown	Twin 104-gun ships of the line, with a design inspired on HMS Victory. Their fate after being sold out of the Royal Navy in 1875 and 1905 (respectively), is unknown.
60 m (196 ft)	16 m (52 ft 6 in)	HMS Trafalgar (later HMS Camperdown)	1820–?	unknown	Ordered as a 98-gun second rate but re-rated and launched as a 106 gun first rate ship of the line. It was placed on harbor service in 1854, hulked in 1857, and renamed HMS Pitt in 1882. It was sold out of the Navy in 1906.
60 m (197 ft)	6.2 m (20 ft)	La Real	1568–1572?	possibly sunk after battle	Flagship galley of Don John of Austria at the Battle of Lepanto (1571). Though victorious in its duel with the Ottoman flagship Sultana, it was so damaged upon its return to Messina that the victory feast was not made aboard. Its fate is unknown but it might have sunk there shortly after. A non-seaworthy replica was built in 1971 for the fourth centenary of the battle and is on display at the Maritime Museum of Barcelona.

=== 59–56 meters (193–184 feet) ===
Length	Beam	Name	Service	Fate	Notes
59.8 m (196 ft)	16.2 m (53 ft)	Invincible	1780–1808	struck	A 110-gun, first rate ship of the line of the French Navy. Saw action during the American Revolutionary War.
59.8 m (196.19 ft)	14.9 m (48.88 ft)	Saint-Esprit class	1765–1799	varied	Three 80-gun ships of the line (Saint-Esprit, Languedoc, and Couronne). Although considered sisters, each was built with a different design.
59.78 m (196 ft 1 in)	15.47 m (50 ft 9 in)	HMS Calcutta	1831–1908	broken up	An 84-gun second rate ship of the line of the Royal Navy. Initially put in reserve, she was mobilized for the Crimean War in 1855 but saw no action as it was deemed obsolete for modern naval warfare. However, she later served as a flagship in the Second Opium War. Since 1865, she served as a gunnery ship and was moored at Devonport.
59.7 m (195.9 ft)	13.2 m (43.3 ft)	Provence	1763–1786	broken up	A 64-gun French ship of the line deployed against the Barbary pirates in the Mediterranean and at the Caribbean theater of the American Revolutionary War, where its captain was killed in action at the Battle of Grenada. After being decommissioned twice from the Navy, it became a merchantman for the Compagnie de Chine.
59.5 m (195 ft)	16.2 m (53 ft)	(Spain) Santa Ana class	1784–1817	varied	Eight sister ships of the line built in Ferrol that served in the Mediterranean and the Atlantic during the Napoleonic Wars. Also called "Los Meregildos" after San Hermenegildo, built in 1789.
59.3 m (194.55 ft)	15.3 m (50.20 ft)	Tonnant class (France) Bucentaure class	1789–1887; 1803–1868 (respectively)	varied	Two different 80-gun ship of the line classes built during the Napoleonic Wars.
59.21 m (194 ft 3 in)	16.54 m (54 ft 3 in)	(Spain) San José (later HMS San Josef)	1783–1849	broken up	A 114-gun first rate ship of the line captured by the British at the Battle of Cape St Vincent (1797). Became a guard and gunnery training ship at HMNB Devonport.
59.2 m (194 ft)	15.6 m (51 ft)	Soleil-Royal	1749–1759	burnt to prevent capture	Flagship of the French Navy at the Battle of Quiberon Bay. During the encounter, it run aground and was burnt by its own crew to prevent its capture by the British. It was the first 80-gun two-decker to use the 24-pounder long gun on her second battery, rising its firing power to that of a three-decker.
59.08 m (193 ft 10 in)	15.96 m (52 ft 4.5 in)	Canopus class	1821–1929	varied	84-gun second rate two-deckers of the Royal Navy based on HMS Canopus, a Tonnant-class ship captured in 1798.
59 m (192 ft)	15.55 m (51 ft)	San Pedro de Alcántara	1772–1786	sunk	A Spanish 64-gun ship of the line built in Ferrol, but based on French designs. Served in the Pacific until 1786, when she sailed to Europe with a cargo of precious metals and several prisoners of Tupac Amaru II's rebellion, then sunk off Peniche, Portugal with great loss of life.
59 m (192 ft)	15 m (49 ft)	HMS Waterloo (later HMS Bellerophon)	1818–?	unknown	An 80-gun third rate ship of the line of the Royal Navy. Renamed in 1824 and sold in 1892, its later fate is unknown.
58.93 m (193 ft 4 in)	15.3 m (50 ft 3.5 in)	Deux Frères (later HMS Juste)	1784–1811	broken up	An 80-gun French ship of the line captured and commissioned into the British Royal Navy after the Glorious First of June in 1794.
58.8 m (193 ft)	15.9 m (52 ft 1 in)	HMS Sans Pareil	1851–1867	broken up	A Royal Navy 70-gun screw propelled ship of the line, based on the lines of a French Tonnant class of the same name captured in 1794.
58.74 m (192 ft 8.5 in)	15 m (49 ft 4.5 in)	HMS Rochfort	1814–1826	broken up	A Royal Navy 74-gun third rate ship of the line designed by the French émigré Jean-Louis Barrallier.
58.5 m (191.9 ft)	11 m (36 ft 3 in)	Götheborg I (Note: Retroactively)	1738–1745	sunk	Built in Stockholm for trade with China and named after Gothenburg, the home port of the Swedish fleet. After three journeys, it crashed on the Knipla Börö rock near Gothenburg and sank within 900 m (3,000 ft) of its berth. All men aboard survived and most of its cargo could be salvaged. The shipwreck, which remained visible from the surface for several years, was excavated in 1986–1992.
58.5 m (191.9 ft)	11 m (36 ft 3 in)	(Sweden) Götheborg III	2003–	museum ship	Götheborg II - 1786-1796; Götheborg III ia a seaworthy replica of the 1738 ship.
58.3 m (191.2 ft)	16.0 m (52.5 ft)	HMS St Lawrence (later St Lawrence)	1814–?	hulked, then sunk	Built in the Kingston Royal Naval Dockyard in Upper Canada during the War of 1812 to fight on the Great Lakes, the only British ship of the line to be launched and entirely operated on freshwater. She never saw action and was decommissioned already in 1815. In 1832 she was sold to a private company and was used as a storage hulk until her sinking.
58 m (190 ft)	16 m (53 ft)	HMS Royal George; HMS Queen Charlotte; HMS Ville de Paris	1788–1822; 1790–1800; 1795–1845 (respectively)	varied	First rate ships of the line of the Royal Navy active in the Napoleonic wars. The first two were built to the same design and carried 100 guns; Ville de Paris (named after a captured French ship) carried 110.
57.96 m (190 ft 2 in)	11 m (36 ft)	(Qing dynasty) Yangwu	1872–1884	sunk	A corvette flagship of the Fujian Fleet, and the largest ship built at the Foochow Arsenal during the Imperial Fleet's westernization program of 1868–1875. It exploded and subsequently sunk during the Battle of Fuzhou in the Sino-French War.
57.9 m (190 ft)	17.3 m (56 ft 9 in)	Vanguard-class	1835–1929	varied	80-gun second rate ships of the line of the Royal Navy. Nine were completed under the original sail ship design, and others were modified or converted into steam.
57.9 m (190 ft)	16 m (52 ft 6 in)	HMS Queen Charlotte (later HMS Excellent)	1810–1892	broken up	A 104-gun first-rate ship of the line of the Royal Navy, built to replace the ship of the same name lost in 1800. Assigned to anti-slavery and anti-smuggling patrol off the coast of Africa until 1859, when she became a training ship.
57.9 m (190 ft)	15.8 m (52 ft)	(Spain) Europa	1789–1801	abandoned	A Spanish third-rate ship of the line that served in Europe and the Pacific during the French Revolutionary Wars. It fell into disrepair and eventually rotted away while being anchored in Manila.
57.5 m (188.6 ft)	9 m (29.5 ft)	(Sweden) Sigyn (later (Finland) Sigyn)	1887–1938	museum ship	A Swedish trade barque, sold to Finland in 1927. Currently preserved in Turku.
57.2 m (187.7 ft)	14 m (45.9 ft)	Six Corps	1762–1780	broken up	A 74-gun ship of the line in the French reserve fleet, named after the six merchant guilds of Paris, who donated the money for its construction.
57.1 m (188 ft 4 in)	15.47 m (50 ft 9 in)	HMS Boscawen (later HMS Wellesley)	1844–1914	burned	A 70-gun third rate ship of the line of the Royal Navy. From 1873 she served as a training ship at Wellesley Nautical School.
57 m (188 ft)	15.67 m (51 ft 5 in)	HMS Boyne (later HMS Excellent); HMS Union	1810–1861; 1811–1833 (respectively)	both broken up	Sister 98-gun second rate shis of the line of the Royal Navy.
57 m (188 ft)	15 m (49 ft 2.75 in)	Formidable (later HMS Ham)	1751–1768	broken up	French 80-gun ship of the line captured by the British at the Battle of Quiberon Bay (1759), during the French and Indian War.
57 m (187 ft)	7.7 m (25 ft)	Réale	1694–1720	decommissioned	Flagship of the French Mediterranean galley fleet, built in Marseille.
56.85 m (186.5 ft)	15.59 m (51.1 ft)	Océan	1756–1759	burnt	French flagship at the Battle of Lagos, where it ran aground and was burnt by the British.
56.6 m (186 ft)	10.5 m (34 ft)	(Dutch East India Company) Batavia	1628–1629	wrecked	Dutch East India Company ship wrecked near the Houtman Abrolhos off western Australia, as a result of a failed mutiny. Though only 40 people of 322 aboard died in the sinking, over 200 perished later as a result of the lack of drinking water and infighting among the survivors.
56.6 m (186 ft)	10.5 m (34 ft)	(Netherlands) Batavia replica	1995–	museum ship	Seaworthy replica of the 1628 ship, built in 1995 and currently housed at the Bataviawerf in Lelystad.
56.52 m (185.4 ft)	15.59 m (51.15 ft)	Royal Louis	1692–1727	broken up	A 120-gun first-rate ship of the line, named after a smaller, earlier ship it replaced.
56.52 m (185.4 ft)	14.46 m (47.4 ft)	Duc de Bourgogne (later Peuple)	1752–1800	broken up	An 80-gun ship of the line and flagship of the French expeditionary fleet to assist the North American rebels during the American Revolutionary War; it carried the Count of Rochambeau and saw action at the Battle of the Saintes. Its hull was coppered in 1761.
56.5 m (185 ft)	15.3 m (50 ft)	Foudroyant	1724–1743	broken up	A first-rate ship of the line that was broken up without ever taking to the sea.
56.3 m (184.7 )	14.2 m (46.6 ft)	Séduisant; Mercure	1783–1796; 1783–1798 (respectively)	wrecked burnt after battle (respectively)	Twin 74-gun ships of the line of the French Navy during the Revolutionary Wars. Séduisant was wrecked accidentally during the expedition to Ireland and Mercure was burnt after being captured at the Battle of the Nile.
56.11 m (184 ft 1 in)	11.05 m (36 ft 3 in)	Marco Polo	1851–1883	wrecked	First cargo and emigrant ship to sail from England to Australia in under six months. It was run aground off Cavendish, Prince Edward Island deliberately when its pumps failed during a storm.
56 m (185 ft)	16 m (51 ft)	Neptune class	1797–1857	all broken up	Three 98-gun second rate ships of the line of the Royal Navy, mostly used during the Napoleonic Wars.
56 m (185 ft)	15.88 m (52 ft 1 in)	HMS Royal Sovereign (later HMS Captain)	1786–1841	hulked and broken up	A 100-gun first rate ship of the line that served at the Glorious First of June, the First Battle of Groix, and as Admiral Collingwood's flagship at the Battle of Trafalgar.
56 m (184 ft)	15 m (49 ft)	Bretagne (later Révolutionnaire)	1766–1796	broken up	Flagship of the Brest fleet during the American Revolutionary War, with 110 guns.
56 m (183 ft 9 in)	unknown	(Portugal) Santa Rosa	1715–1726	exploded	A Portuguese galleon destroyed by an accidental gunpowder explosion while sailing in convoy from Salvador, Brazil to Lisbon. It previously saw action against the Ottomans in the Mediterranean.

== Longest wooden ships by ensign ==
Nationality	Navy	Length	Merchant	Length
Australia			City of Adelaide (1864)	74.4 m (244 ft 1 in)
Belgium			(Belgium) British Queen (1839)	75 m (245 ft)
Canada			(Canada) William D. Lawrence (1874) (Note: The disposable ship Columbus (108 m) was built in Canada in 1824, and flew the British red ensign.)	102 m (335 ft)
China	(Qing dynasty) Haian (1872) (Qing dynasty) Yuyuen (1873)	91 m (300 ft)	Tek Sing (c. 1822)	50 m (165 ft)
Denmark	Jylland (1860)	102 m (335 ft)	(Denmark) Kaskelot (1948)	47 m (153 ft)
England	Sovereign of the Seas (1637)	71.5 m (234.6 ft)		
Egypt	Khufu ship (2500 BC)	43.6 m (143 ft)		
Finland			Sigyn (1887)	57.5 m (188.6 ft)
France	Rochambeau (1865)	115 m (377.3 ft)	Provence (1763)	59.7 m (195.9 ft)
Germany	Walther von Ledebur (1966)	63.16 m (207 ft 3 in)	(German Empire) Jacob Fritz (1856)	80.9 m (265.3 ft)
Greece	(Greece) Olympias (1987)	36.9 m (121 ft 1 in)		
Hanseatic League	Adler von Lübeck (1567)	78.3 m (256.9 ft)	Peter von Danzig (c. 1462)	51 m (167.3 ft)
Hong Kong			(Hong Kong) Bounty (1978)	42 m (138 ft)
Italy	Cambria (1845)	67 m (219 ft)		
Ireland			(Republic of Ireland) Dunbrody (2001)	53.7 m (176 ft 2 in)
Japan	Kasuga (1862)	73.6 m (241.5 ft)	Date Maru (1613)	55.35 m (181 ft 7 in)
Korea	Turtle ship (1591)	36.6 m (120 ft)		
Kuwait			(Kuwait) Al-Hashemi-II (2001)	83.7 m (274.6 ft)
Malta	San Giovanni (1796)	49.8 m (163 ft 3 in)		
Netherlands	(Netherlands) Chatham (1800) (Netherlands) Koninklijke Hollander (1806)	55.2 m (181.1 ft)	(Dutch East India Company) Batavia (1628)	56.6 m (186 ft)
New Zealand			Edwin Fox (1853)	48 m (157 ft)
Norway	Kong Sverre (1860)	64.9 m (212 ft 11 in)	Kommandør Svend Foyn (1874)	102 m (335 ft)
Portugal	(Portugal) Dom Fernando II e Glória (1845)	87 m (284 ft)	(Portugal) Ferreira (1869)	85.34 m 280 ft
Prussia	SMS Barbarossa (1840)	63 m (207 ft)		
Roman Empire	Nemi Ship II (1st century AD)	73 m (240 ft)	Caligula's Giant Ship (c. 37 AD)	c. 95.1 m (312 ft)
Russia	Derzhava (1871)	94.8 m (311 ft)	(Russia) Belyana type (19th century)	100 m (328 ft)
Scotland	(Scotland) Great Michael (1512)	73.2 m 249.8 ft		
Spain	(Spain) Sagunto (1869)	89.5 m (283 ft 8 in)	(Spain) El Galeón (2017)	55 m (180 ft)
Sweden	(Sweden) Vasa (1628)	69 m (226 ft)	Götheborg (1738)	58.5 m (191.9 ft)
Ottoman Empire	(Ottoman Empire) Mahmudiye (1829)	76.15 m (249.8 ft)		
United Kingdom	HMS Orlando (1858); HMS Mersey (1858)	102.1 m (335 ft)	Columbus (1824)	108 m (356 ft)
United States	USS Dunderberg (1865)	115 m (377.3 ft)	(United States) Wyoming (1909)	140 m (450 ft)

== Claimed but poorly documented ==
Many ships have been claimed, so this list will exclude ships that the existence of most historians do not support, namely the Noah's Ark will not be included as a majority of biblical scholars do not take it as literal.

Length	Name	Completed	Notes
304.8 m (1000 ft)	晉 Wang Jun's tower ship	3rd century AD	The largest of the armored floating fortresses (louchuan) that were used as flagships of river flotillas during the Han and Jin dynasties. According to the Tang dynasty's Taibai Jinjing, it was used on the Yangtze during the Jin conquest of Wu and was equipped with special hanging galleries to transport horses and war chariots. Though oar-powered only, tower ships tended to lose control when faced with wind changes, and this caused their abandonment.
144–180 m (472–591 ft), or 88.56 m LOA (290 ft) and 80.51 m (264 ft) LOD.	Pati Unus's jong	c. 1512	Javanese seagoing junk type claimed to carry up to 1000 passengers. Though the early 16th century Portuguese did not record exact sizes, they remarked that the ships were so monstrously big that Flor do Mar and Anunciada (the largest Portuguese ships of the time) did not seem ships when next to them. Irawan Djoko Nugroho estimate it to be 4–5 times the length of Flor do Mar, which was about 36 m long (Malaysian reconstruction). His estimation has been contested as it is not based on engineering grounds, Muhammad Averoes estimated it with an LOA of 88.56 m and LOD of 80.51 m.
c. 135 by 55 metres (443 by 180 ft), 70 m (230 ft) long (modern estimate)	大明 Chinese treasure ship	15th century AD	The 18th century History of the Ming dynasty claims that the largest 15th century junks of the Ming emperors were more than 400 feet (120 m) long, and calculations based on 15+ ft stern rudder posts found have been used to claim total ship lengths of 400 to 600 feet (180 m). However, this has been disputed. Xin Yuan'ou, a shipbuilding engineer and professor at Shanghai Jiao Tong University, argues that it is highly unlikely that Zheng He's treasure ships were 450 ft long, and suggests that they were probably closer to a most conservative estimate of 230–250 feet (70–76 m) in length, other estimate were 309–408 feet (94–124 m) in length and 160–166 feet (49–51 m) in width.
128 m by 18 m (420×58 ft)	Tessarakonteres	Late 3rd century BC	A Greek galley with 40 lines of oarsmen (for a total of 4000), from which her name derives. It reportedly had an additional crew of 400 and could transport 2850 soldiers according to Athenaeus and Plutarch. She was built for Ptolemy IV Philopator. Modern naval engineers have speculated that the ship, of which there is no surviving depiction, had two twin hulls rather than one. According to Plutarch the ship proved difficult and dangerous to move during tests. As early as the 19th century, the dimensions of the ship have been contested since it caused several problems in terms of maneuverability and structural integrity.
110 m (360 ft) or 70–75 m (230–246 ft) according to modern estimates	Leontophoros	c. 280 BC	A warship (octere) built for Lysimachos. After his death, it was used by Ptolemy Keraunos to defeat Antigonus I in a battle in 280 BC. The length estimate is based on Memnon of Heraclea's claim that each line had 100 oarsmen, bringing the total to 1600.
100 m (328 ft) length 17 m (56 ft) breadth	Cakra Dunia	Before 1629	Acehnese 98-gun galley class numbering 47 units. One captured by the Portuguese was renamed the Espanto do Mundo ("Terror of the Universe"). Armed with 18 large cannons (five 55-pounders at the bow, one 25-pounder at the stern, the rest were 17 and 18-pounders), 80 falcons and many swivel guns. It was claimed to have three masts with square sails and topsails, 35 oars on each side, and a crew of 700 men.
91.4 m (300 ft) long, 9.1 m (30 ft) wide, 6.1 m (20 ft) depth, 3.4 m (11 ft) freeboard	A gurap reported by H. Warington Smyth	Before 1902	A two-masted trading ship from the Nusantara archipelago, using fore-and-aft sail made with cloth, with yard and gaff topsail. It is built from giam wood.
87 m (285 ft) long, 18 m (59 ft) high, and 13 m (43 ft) wide.	Ptolemy IV Philopator's thalamegos	c. 200 BC	A river going pomp boat of Ptolemy IV Philopator whose name translates to "Rooms Carrier". It is speculated that the ship had two hulls, with one single mast with a yard and sail, and is said to have been towed from the banks of the Nile.
c. 63–95 m by 27–32 m	Hatshepsut's barge	c. 1500 BC	Used to transport obelisks. The barge may have been "too large to be equipped with a sail and not very manoeuvrable", and "would have been towed downstream by smaller vessels, also using the current, from Aswan to Thebes."
55 m (180 ft) long, 14 m (46 ft) wide	Syracusia (later Alexandria)	c. 240 BC	Claimed to be the largest transport ship in Antiquity. She was designed by Archimedes and built by Archias of Corinth on the orders of Hieron II of Syracuse. It sailed only once to Alexandria, Egypt, where it was gifted to Ptolemy III Euergetes and permanently berthed.
55 m (180 ft) long, 13.7 (45 ft) m wide	Isis	c. 150 AD	Described by the sophist Lucian, who saw her moored at Athens' seaport of Piraeus.
45–60 m (150–195 ft)	Ormen Lange	c. 1000	A Viking longship whose name translates as "Long Serpent", built for King Olav Tryggvason of Norway. It was said to be the largest and most powerful longship of the time.

== Longest still in existence ==
=== Over 56 meters (184 feet) ===
Length	Beam	Name	Service	Current Status
102 m (335 ft)	13.5 m (44 ft)	Jylland	1860–1908	Museum
91.1 m (299 ft)	23.7 m (78 ft)	(United States) Eureka	1890–1957	Museum
87 m (284 ft)	13 m (42 ft)	(Portugal) Dom Fernando II e Glória	1845–1940	Museum
85.34 m (280 ft)	10.97 m 36 ft	Cutty Sark	1869–1954	Museum
83.7 m (274.6 ft)	18.5 m (60.7 ft)	(Kuwait) Al-Hashemi-II	2001–	Museum
78.5 m (274.6 ft)	10.6 m (35 ft)	(Belgium) Mercator	1932-	Museum
74.4 m (244 ft 1 in)	10.15 m (33.3 ft)	City of Adelaide	1864–1948	Museum
69 m (226 ft)	15.7 m (51 ft 10 in)	HMS Victory	1765–	Museum
69 m (226 ft)	11.7 m (38 ft)	(Sweden) Vasa	1628	Museum
67 m (219 ft)	11 m (36 ft)	(United States) C.A. Thayer	1895–	Museum
65 m (213.2 ft)	10.6 m	SV Tenacious	2000–	Unknown – currently no voyages
65 m (213 ft)	11.24 m (50 ft 1 in)	(France) Hermione	2014–	In Maintenance
62.2 m (204.0 ft)	13.3 m (43 ft 6 in)	USS Constitution	1797–	Museum – Limited voyages
61 m (199 ft)	13 m (43 ft)	USS Constellation	1854–1955	Museum
58.5 m (191.9 ft)	11 m (36 ft 1 in)	(Sweden) Götheborg III	2003–	In Maintenance
57.5 m (188.6 ft)	9 m (29.5 ft)	(Finland) Sigyn	1887–1938	Museum
56.6 m (186 ft)	10.5 m (34 ft)	(Netherlands) Batavia replica	1995–	Museum

=== 56–40 meters (184–131 feet) ===
Length	Beam	Name	Service	Comment
55.35 m (181 ft 7 in)	11.25 m (36 ft 11 in)	(Japan) San Juan Bautista	1993–	A replica of the first western-style ship built in Japan, a reverse-engineered Spanish galleon built by Date Masamune for trade and diplomacy with New Spain. The original 1613 records of the House of Date were used for the replica. Displayed in a theme park of Ishinomaki, where she survived the 2011 Tōhoku earthquake and tsunami intact.
55 m (180 ft)	10.09 m (33.1 ft)	(Spain) El Galeón	2017–	A seaworthy replica of a Spanish galleon, built by the Nao Victoria Foundation and used in commercials and history themed media.
54.71 m (179 ft 6 in)	9.8 m (32 ft)	(United States) "HMS" Surprise	1970–	Built as a sail training ship, the "HMS" Rose (though it was never commissioned by the Royal Navy), it was modified and renamed Surprise for her part in the movie Master and Commander: The Far Side of the World. She was sold to the Maritime Museum of San Diego in 2007. She again appeared on film as HMS Providence in the Disney film Pirates of the Caribbean: On Stranger Tides.
54 m (177 ft)	7.9 m (27 ft)	(United States) Gazela	1901–1971	Originally a Portuguese fishing vessel operating on the Grand Banks of Newfoundland, she was sail-powered only until 1938, when an engine was installed. The ship was acquired by the Philadelphia Maritime Museum in 1971, and the Philadelphia Ship Preservation Guild in 1985.
53.7 m (176 ft 2 in)	8.5 m (27 ft 11 in)	(Republic of Ireland) Dunbrody	2001–	A replica of the Quebec-built, three-masted barque of the same name (active 1845–1875).
51.8 m (170 ft)	11 m (36 ft)	HMS Gannet	1878–	Last surviving Doterel-class sloop. Currently a museum ship in Chatham, Medway.
51 m	10.12 m	(Spain) w:es:Galeón Andalucía	2010	Replica
48 m (158 ft)	8.4 m (27.5 ft)	(United States) Clipper City	c.1984–	A private replica schooner named after a cargo clipper built in Manitowoc, Wisconsin in 1854.
48 m (157.5 ft)	8.5 m (28 ft)	Kaskelot	1948–	A three masted barque built by the Danish Royal Greenland Trading Company to carry supplies to eastern Greenland. Sold to private British owners in 2013.
48 m (157 ft)	9.04 m (29 ft 8 in)	Edwin Fox	1853–1950	Last surviving ship to transport convicts to Australia; also served as a transport in the Crimean War. Currently dry-docked in New Zealand.
47 m (154 ft 2 in)	8 m (26 ft 3 in)	(Republic of Ireland) Jeanie Johnston	1998–	A replica of the Quebec-built three masted barque of the same name (active 1847–1858).
47 m (153 ft)	11.5 m (38 ft)	(Netherlands) Amsterdam	1990–	A replica of the Dutch East India Company ship of the same name. Built in Iroko wood with traditional tools, and currently moored next to the Netherlands Maritime Museum.
46.25 m (151 ft 9 in)	12.27 m (40 ft 3 in)	HMS Unicorn	1824–1964	One of two surviving Leda-class frigates built after the end of the Napoleonic Wars, although her design was modified during construction, was never rigged, and served as a hulk in reserve through her whole career. She is currently preserved as a museum ship in Dundee, Scotland.
46 m (152 ft)	10 m (34 ft)	(France) Étoile du Roy	1996–	A three-masted sixth rate frigate built to stand in for the (historically larger) HMS Indefatigable in the British TV series Hornblower. Sold to private French owners in 2010.
46 m (150 ft 11 in)	8 m (26 ft 3 in)	(Canada) Bluenose II	1963–	Slightly longer replica of the fishing schooner Bluenose (1921–1946).
45.8 m (150 ft 4.5 in)	12.2 m (39 ft 11 in)	HMS Trincomalee	1817–1986	The other surviving Leda-class frigate, currently moored at the National Museum of the Royal Navy in Hartlepool. It may be considered the oldest Royal Navy warship that is truly afloat, as HMS Victory is actually in dry dock.
45.2 m (148.3 ft)	8 m (26 ft)	Alma Doepel	1903–1999	One of the oldest surviving three-masted topsail schooners. Berthed due to a lack of funds to restore it.
44.2 m (145 ft)	7.3 m	Earl of Pembroke	1945–	A Swedish-built three masted barque originally used to haul timber in the Baltic Sea. Sold to private British owners in 1979.
43.6 m (143 ft)	6 m (19.5 ft)	Khufu ship	c. 2500 BC	An Ancient Egyptian solar barge buried at the foot of the Great Pyramid of Giza as part of the funerary rites for the pharaoh Khufu (a.k.a. Cheops). Found intact, though disassembled, in 1954, and restored for exhibition in 1982. It is the oldest intact, full-sized ship in the world.
43.6 m (143 ft)	9.28 m (30.4 ft)	HM Bark Endeavour Replica	1993–	Replica of HMS Endeavour owned by the Australian National Maritime Museum.
43 m (141 ft)	7.6 m (25 ft)	(United States) Kalmar Nyckel	1997–	A replica of the armed merchant of the same name that carried the first settlers to New Sweden in 1638.
42.7 m (140 ft)	7.8 m (26 ft)	Søren Larsen	1949–	A brigantine built in Denmark for trade in the Baltic Sea. After suffering a fire in 1972, it was purchased by a British owner who remodeled it in 19th-century style and lent it for TV productions. It was purchased again by the Sydney Harbour Tallships company in 2011.
42 m (138 ft)	7 m (23 ft)	(Hong Kong) Bounty	1978–	Replica of HMS Bounty built for the British 1984 film The Bounty, twice the size of the original.

=== 40–30 meters (128–98 feet) ===
Length	Beam	Name	Service	Comment
40 m (131 ft)	unknown	(United States) Coronet	1885–	One of the oldest surviving and largest schooner yachts in the world.
39.6 m (130 ft)	6.7 m (22 ft)	Southern Swan	1922–	Built in Denmark for trade with Greenland; sold in Canada in the 1960s, and in Australia in 2007.
39.6 m (130 ft)	5.7 m (19 ft)	(Ottoman Empire) Tarihi Kadırga	1600s–1839	The oldest continuously maintained wooden ship in the world. Preserved in the Istanbul Naval Museum.
38.9 m (127 ft 8 in)	10.36 m (34 ft)	(Norway) Fram	1892–1912	Norwegian Arctic and Antarctic exploration ship used successively by Fridtjof Nansen, Otto Sverdrup, Oscar Wisting, and Roald Amundsen. Believed to be the wooden ship ever been furtherst to both the north and south of Earth. Preserved since 1935 in Oslo's Fram Museum.
37 m (121 ft 4 in)	6.99 m (22 ft 11 in)	Golden Hinde	1973–	A replica of the 1577 privateer Golden Hind (a.k.a. Pelican) used by Francis Drake to circunnavegate the world.
37 m (120 ft)	7.5 m (24.5 ft)	(United States) Arthur Foss	1889–1968	Possibly the oldest surviving wooden tugboat, currently preserved in Seattle.
36.9 m (121 ft 1 in)	5.5 m (18 ft 1 in)	(Greece) Olympias	1987–	A replica ancient Athenian trireme built as an exercise in experimental archaeology. Also a commissioned ship in the Hellenic Navy, the only one of its kind in the world.
36 m (118 ft)	unknown	(Germany) Lisa von Lübeck	2004–	A replica of a caravel used by the Hanseatic League in the 15th century.
35 m (115 ft)	8 m (26 ft)	(Norway) Draken Harald Hårfagre	2012–	A private replica of a Viking longship, and the largest built in modern times.
35 m (116 ft)	unknown	(United States) Susan Constant	1957–	A replica of the English Virginia Company ship of the same name that took part on the founding of Jamestown in 1607. Currently docked at the Jamestown Settlement living history museum.
34.5 m (113 ft)	7 m (23 ft)	(Russia) Shtandart	1999–	A private replica of the Russian Baltic fleet's first frigate of the same name, which was active in 1703–1727.
34 m (113 ft)	8.38 m (27 ft 6 in)	(United States) Charles W. Morgan	1841–1926	Oldest surviving merchant ship and last surviving wooden whaling ship. She was restored after being nearly destroyed in a fire and is currently displayed in Mystic, Connecticut.
33 m (108 ft)	6 m (20 ft)	Windeward Bound	1992–	A replica of an 1848 Boston schooner, based in Hobart, Tasmania.
32.46 m (106 ft 6 in)	27 m (90 ft)	(United States) Mayflower II	1955–	A replica of the 17th century ship of the same name, commissioned by the Plimoth Plantation living history museum and built in Devon using traditional tools and the original blueprints. Its maiden voyage in 1957 also recreated the original's travel from Plymouth, England to Plymouth, Massachusetts.
32 m (106 ft)	7.6 m (25 ft)	(United States) Clearwater	1968–	A river sloop built by the non-profit organization Hudson River Sloop Clearwater to promote the protection of the Hudson River and its surrounding wetlands. Its design is based on Dutch sloops of the 18th and 19th centuries.
32 m (104 ft)	6.7 m (22 ft)	(United States) Lady Maryland	1985–	An educational vessel in Baltimore.
31.28 m (102.6 ft)	7 m (23 ft)	(Spain) Atyla	1984–	A two masted wooden schooner owned by a NGO and used as a training ship.
30 m (100 ft)	7.4 m	(Japan) Naniwa Maru	1999–	A replica of a higaki kaisen, a common trading vessel of the Edo Period. Currently displayed at the Osaka Maritime Museum.
30 m (100 ft)	unknown	(Denmark) Havhingsten fra Glendalough	2004–	A replica of the Viking longship known as Skuldelev 2 (c. 1042). Built by the Viking Ship Museum in Roskilde, Denmark and used in the television series The Last Kingdom.

== See also ==
- List of ancient ships
- List of longest ships
- List of large sailing vessels
- List of oldest surviving ships
