= Thalamegos =

Type of Nile river vessel

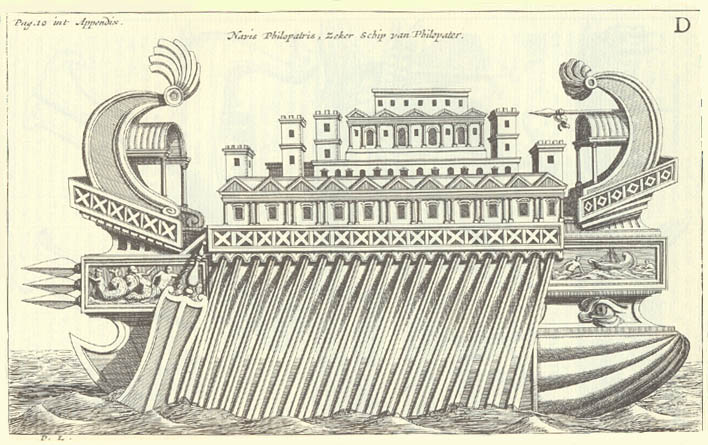
Drawing of Ptolemy IV's Thalamegos, by Nicolaes Witsen, 1671

Thalamegos (plural: Thalamegoi) was a type of houseboat, yacht, or barge mainly found in the Nile River, Egypt. They were used as freight carriers and ferry. The most famous and largest thalamegos was a huge twin-hulled catamaran, a two-story Nile River palace barge that was commissioned by Hellenistic king Ptolemy IV Philopator for himself and his wife Arsinoe III ca. 200 BCE.

The first discovery of a Thalamegos was made by the European Institute for Underwater Archaeology (IEASM) in 2025 in the royal port of the sunken island of Antirhodos in today's eastern harbour of Alexandria.

== Etymology ==
The name comes from Ancient Greek: θαλαμηγός (room carrier) from the Greek Thalamos which means room and Ago which means haul/carry/lead.

== Description and role ==
Due to the popularity of Ptolemy IV's thalamegos, they are usually described as palace barges or floating palaces. Callegaro pointed out that the name refers to a type of barge of that time. Appian recorded that Ptolemy II Philadelphus possessed 800 thalamegoi which could be used for military service. Some were used for cruising the Nile for government business and religious ceremonies. There were also thalamegoi configured as pleasure-craft and cargo carriers.

== Ptolemy IV's thalamegos ==
Callixenus of Rhodes described Philopator's vessel in his Peri Alexandreias:

The Thalamegos had the length of half a stadium, and width by the widest part of 30 cubits. Its height, including the structure of the pavilion, reached almost 40 cubits. [...] Its form resembled neither warships nor merchant ships but had been altered to suit the depths of the river. Thus, the lower part was shallow and wide and instead was high in height. The upper parts, and especially that of the bow, stretched considerably, and its curvature was well traced. It had a double bow and a double stern, and it rose to the top because in the river the waves often rise very high.

In its intermediate cavity were built the banquet halls, the bedrooms, and everything else that is needed for daily life. [...] Near the bow one came upon a chamber devoted to Dionysos; it contained thirteen couches and was surrounded by a row of columns. It had a cornice that was gilded as far as the surrounding architrave; the ceiling was decorated in accordance with the spirit of the god. In this room, on the right-hand side, a recess was built, which was entirely covered with real gold and precious stones so that it looked like a stone wall. Enshrined in it were portrait statues of the royal family made of Parian marble.

It is estimated that this thalamegos was about 87 m (285 ft) long, 18 m (59 ft) high, and 13 m (43 ft) wide.

== See also ==
- List of world's largest wooden ships
- Nemi ships
- Caligula's Giant Ship
- Isis ship
- Baochuan
- Jong (ship)

== Bibliography ==
- Casson, Lionel (1986). "Chapter Fourteen: Small Craft". Ships and Seamanship in the Ancient World. New Jersey: Princeton University Press. pp. 341–342. ISBN 0-691-00215-0.
- Casson, Lionel (1995). "Chapter 14: Small Craft". Ships and Seamanship in the Ancient World. Baltimore: The Johns Hopkins University Press. pp. 341–342. ISBN 0-8018-5130-0.
- Callegaro, Martina (2019). Fasano, E.; Scamardella, A.; Bucci, V. (eds.). "Houseboating in ancient times: thalamegos, lusoriae, cubiculae and the Nemi ships as ancestors of nowadays floating houses trend". Nautical and Maritime Culture, from the Past to the Future: Proceedings of the 3rd International Conference on Nautical and Maritime Culture: 59–69. ISBN 9781643680392.
- Habe, Yuichiro (2020). "Floating Palace on the Nile: A Study on the Luxury Ship of Ptolemy IV Philopator". JASCA: Japan Studies in Classical Antiquity. 4: 53–70.
