= Baldwin Wake Walker =

Royal Navy Admiral (1802–1876)

Admiral Sir Baldwin Wake Walker Bt KCB CMG
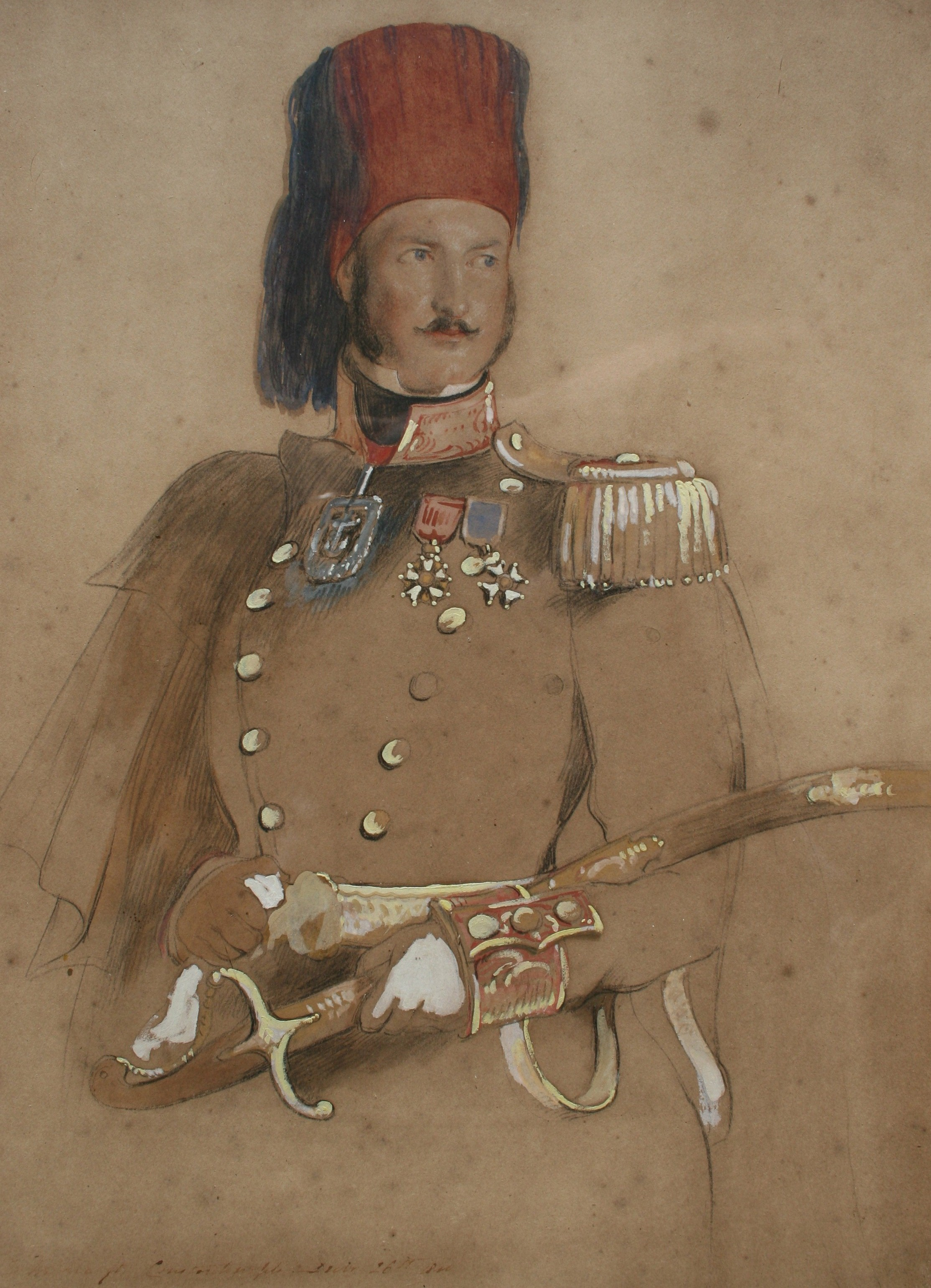
- Walker in Turkish service, 1840.
- Born: 6 January 1802; Port-e-Vullen, near Ramsey, Isle of Man
- Died: 12 February 1876 (aged 74); Diss, Norfolk
- Military career
- Allegiance: United Kingdom
- Branch: Royal Navy
- Service years: 1812 to 1876
- Rank: Royal Navy Admiral
- Commands: HMS Vanguard 1836–1838; HMS Queen 1845–1846; HMS Constance 1846–1847; Cape of Good Hope Station 1861–1865; Nore Command 1866–1869
- Conflicts: Morea expedition, 1828; Bombardment of Acre, 1840
- Awards: KCB; Order of the Iron Crown; Order of St. Anna; Order of the Red Eagle
- Other work: Surveyor of the Navy, 1848–1861

Admiral Sir Baldwin Wake Walker, 1st Baronet, KCB, CMG (6 January 1802 – 12 February 1876) was Surveyor of the Navy from 1848 to 1861. and was responsible for the Royal Navy's warship construction programme during the 1850s naval arms race and at the time of the introduction of the Ironclad warship; it was his decision to build HMS Warrior. He was created 1st Baronet Wake Walker, of Oakley House in 1856.

== Early life ==
Baldwin Wake Walker was the eldest son of John Walker of Whitehaven and Frances, daughter of Captain Drury Wake.

== Career ==
=== Naval service ===
Walker entered the Royal Navy in 1812, and was made a Lieutenant in April, 1820. He served 2 years on the Jamaica station, then for 3 years on the coast of South America and the west coast of Africa.

In 1827 he entered service in the Mediterranean aboard HMS Rattlesnake and was first lieutenant of the bomb vessel HMS Aetna at the attack on Morea Castle during the Morea expedition. For this service he received the crosses of the Légion d'honneur and of the Greek Order of the Redeemer.

He saw further service in the Mediterranean aboard the ships HMS Asia, HMS Britannia and HMS Barham, being promoted to Commander in 1834. In that rank he served in HMS Vanguard from 1836 – 1838.

Walker married Mary Catherine Sinclair Worth, daughter of Captain John Worth and Catherine Sinclair, on 9 September 1834.

In 1838 Walker was given special permission from the Admiralty to accept a command in the Turkish Navy, which he was known as Walker Bey and later as Yavir Pasha. In July 1840 Ahmet Fevzi Paşa, the Capitán-Pasha (the chief admiral of the Turkish fleet), took the fleet to Alexandria and delivered it to Muhammad Ali of Egypt, who then refused to part with it. Walker summoned the Turkish Captains to a Council of War, and proposed a night landing where he would surround the palace, carry off Muhammad Ali, and despatch him to Constantinople. This operation was cancelled due to Muhammad Ali letting the ships go.

While serving with the Turkish Navy he commanded the Turkish squadron at the bombardment of Acre in November 1840, for which service he became a Knight Commander of the Bath on 12 January 1841; he also received the second class of the Austrian Order of the Iron Crown, the Russian Order of St. Anna, and the Prussian Order of the Red Eagle.

Following his return to England in 1845 he commanded HMS Queen as flag-captain to Sir John West at Devonport, and from 1846 – 1847, the frigate HMS Constance in the Pacific.

From 1848 – 1861, he was Surveyor of the Navy (the post being known as Controller of the Navy from 1859) and served as a Juror for the Great Exhibition of 1851. He has created a baronet on 18 July 1856, gaining the title 1st Baronet Wake Walker, of Oakley House, appointed Rear Admiral of the Blue in 1858, and Rear-Admiral of the White in 1861, in which year he was also appointed Commander-in-Chief, Cape of Good Hope and West Coast of Africa Station. He returned to England in 1864, being promoted to vice admiral in 1865 and being appointed Commander-in-Chief, The Nore in 1866. He was promoted to Admiral in 1870.

=== Surveyor of the Navy ===
In his capacity as Surveyor of the Navy, Walker specified the requirements that led to the design of the large wooden screw frigates HMS Diadem, HMS Doris, HMS Ariadne, HMS Galatea, HMS Mersey, and HMS Orlando which were known simply as "Walker's Big Frigates". These large vessels were designed to compete with the United States Navy which had decided to build five steam frigates and one steam corvette. The ships had only a short service history as they were both too large for wooden ships and expensive to operate, as they required large crews. It is reported that due to the stresses caused by their powerful engines, Orlando and Mersey were both broken up after less than 20 years of service.

When in 1858 the French started building La Gloire, the first armoured iron-hulled ship, the Admiralty was asked what it was doing to match this "new engine of war". Walker replied that he believed iron hulls would never replace wooden ships. After strong representations by Walker and Henry Corry, the Parliamentary under-secretary to the Admiralty, the Board of Admiralty was moved on 22 November 1858 to call for designs for a wooden-hulled, armour-plated warship, whose dimensions were approximately equal to those of La Gloire. Eventually it was decided to construct an iron-hulled ship instead, and HMS Warrior was the result.

== Later life ==
Baldwin Wake Walker died on 12 February 1876 at his house in Diss, Norfolk. He was succeeded as Baronet by his eldest son Baldwin Wake Walker (born 1846–1905). His grandson Sir Frederic Wake-Walker also achieved flag rank and served in both World Wars, playing a leading role in the evacuation of Dunkirk and the hunt for the battleship Bismarck.

== See also ==
- O'Byrne, William Richard (1849). "Walker, Baldwin Wake" . A Naval Biographical Dictionary . John Murray – via Wikisource.

== Notes ==
Military offices
New post	Controller of the Navy; 1859–1861	Succeeded by Sir Robert Robinson
Preceded by Sir Henry Keppel	Commander-in-Chief, Cape of Good Hope Station; 1861–1865	Succeeded by Frederick Montresor
Preceded by Sir Charles Talbot	Commander-in-Chief, The Nore; 1866–1869	Succeeded by Richard Warren
Baronetage of the United Kingdom
New creation	Baronet (of Oakley House); 1856–1876	Succeeded by Baldwin Wake Walker
