= French ship Royal Hollandais =

Three ships of the French Navy have borne the name Royal Hollandais in honour of the Kingdom of Holland, a puppet state created by Napoléon.

== Ships named Royal Hollandais ==
- French brig Royal Hollandais (1810), a 16-gun brig.
- French ship Royal Hollandais (1810), a 90-gun Chatham-class ship of the line.
- French ship Royal Hollandais (1812), a 74-gun Téméraire-class ship of the line.

== Notes and references ==
=== Bibliography ===
- Roche, Jean-Michel (2005). Dictionnaire des bâtiments de la flotte de guerre française de Colbert à nos jours. Vol. 1. Group Retozel-Maury Millau. p. 177. ISBN 978-2-9525917-0-6. OCLC 165892922.
