= HMS Orlando (1858) =

Historical British navy warship

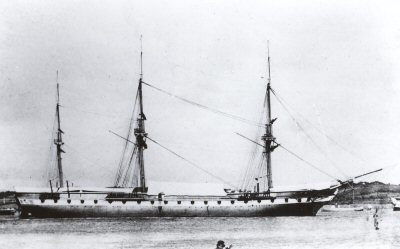
- Orlando in 1861

History

United Kingdom
- Name: Orlando
- Ordered: 31 March 1855
- Builder: Pembroke Dockyard
- Cost: £187,042
- Laid down: November 1856
- Launched: 16 June 1858
- Commissioned: 17 December 1861
- Fate: Sold for breaking up 15 June 1871

General characteristics
- Displacement: 5,493 tons
- Tons burthen: 3,740 tons BM
- Length: 336 ft 9 in (102.64 m) overall, 300 ft 0.5 in (91.453 m) gundeck, 264 ft 3.25 in (80.5498 m) keel
- Beam: 52 ft 1 in (15.88 m)
- Draught: 29 ft (8.8 m)
- Depth of hold: 19 ft 10 in (6.05 m)
- Propulsion: sails; 1000 shp auxiliary steam engine.
- Speed: 13.290kts on trial
- Endurance: 145 hours at full steam
- Complement: around 600
- Armament: 1859: Upper deck: 12 × 8-inch/68-pounder shell guns; Main deck: 28 × 10-inch shell guns
- Armour: none

HMS Orlando was a Mersey-class wooden-hulled steam-powered (although fully rigged with sails) screw frigate built for the Royal Navy from 1856 to 1858 but not commissioned until 1861. Orlando and her sister ship Mersey were the longest wooden warships built for the Royal Navy. At 336 feet in length, Orlando was nearly twice the length of Victory, the flagship of Admiral Horatio Nelson at the Battle of Trafalgar. Her length required the extension of both the shed she was built under and the splipway she was built on. At 5,643 tons displacement, she was certainly a large and impressive looking ship in her day. She was heavily armed, and in comparison to many of her counterparts was quite fast with an approximate speed of 12½ knots, achieving 13½ on trials. The ship was designed by Baldwin Wake Walker as a part of a series of 6 in 3 classes to counter 1854 US plans to build 5 large frigates.

The length, the unique aspect of the ship, was actually an Achilles' heel of Mersey and Orlando. The extreme length of the ship put enormous strains on her hull due to the unusual merging of heavy machinery, and a lengthy wooden hull, resulting in her seams opening up. They were pushing the limits of what was possible in wooden ship construction.

In 1866 Orlando was laid up and was sold for breaking in 1871.
