= Adler von Lübeck =

Hanseatic League ship (1567–1588)

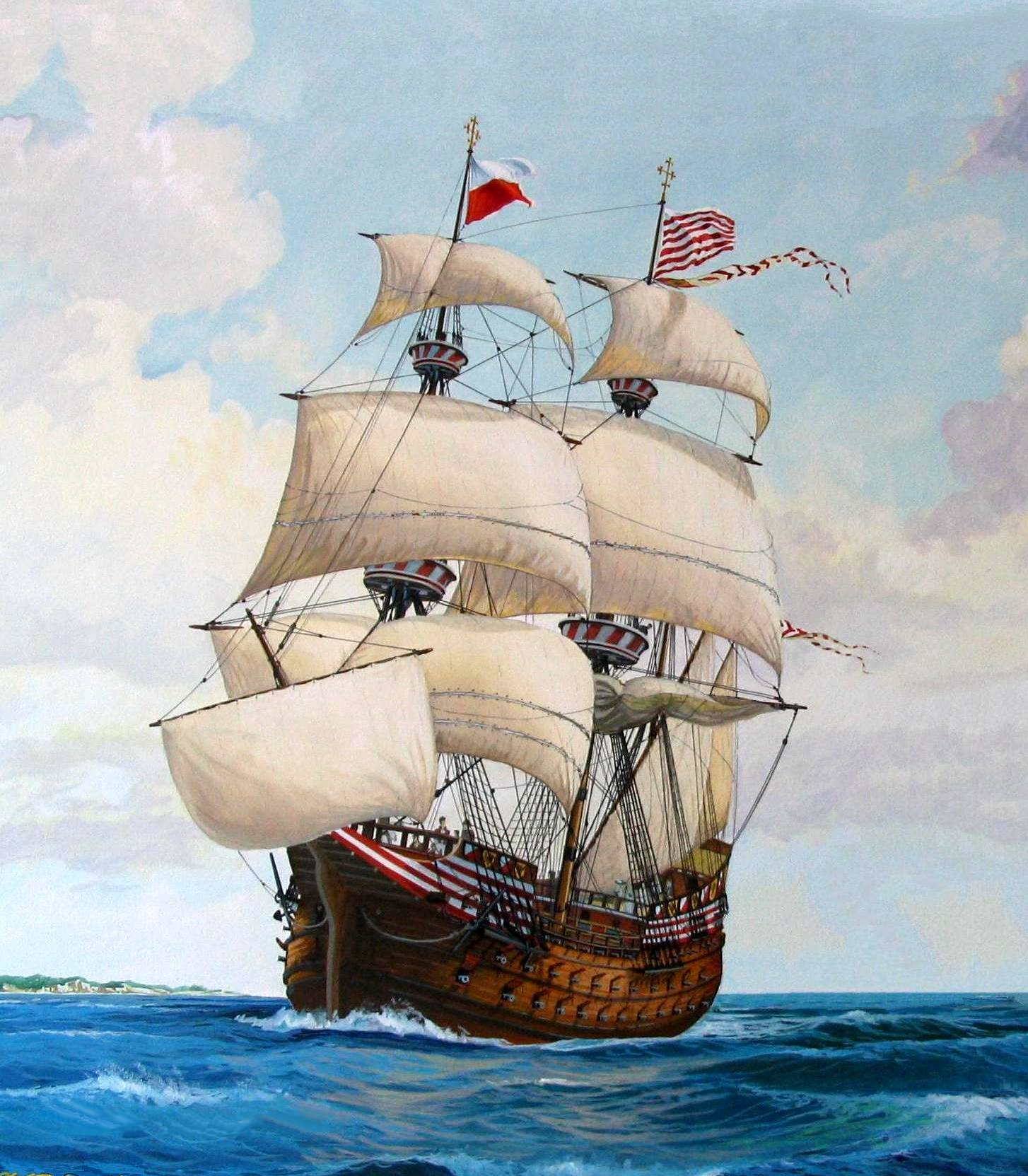
- Adler von Lübeck by Olaf Rahardt, painted in 2004.

History

Lübeck
- Name: Adler von Lübeck
- Builder: Wallhalbinsel in Lübeck
- Laid down: 1565
- Launched: March 1566
- Commissioned: 1567
- Fate: Broken up in 1588

General characteristics
- Displacement: 2,000–3,000 tons
- Length: 78.30 m (256.9 ft) (overall)
- Beam: 14.50 m (47.6 ft)
- Draught: 5.30 m (17.4 ft)
- Propulsion: Sails — 1,793.53 m^{2}
- Complement: 1,000: 350 crew & 650 marines
- Armament: 138 cannon; Bronze guns: 8 × 48 pounders; 6 × 24 pounders; 26 × 10 pounders; 4 × 5 pounders; 8 × 3 pounders; Iron guns: 10 × 6 pounders; 40 × 1 1/2 pounders; 36 × varying calibre
- Notes: Height from waterline to top of mainmast: 62.51 m

Adler von Lübeck (English: "Eagle of Lübeck") was a galleon built by the Hanseatic League city of Lübeck in the 1560s. She was one of the largest ships in the world upon completion, measuring at 78.30 metres long and displacing 2–3,000 tons when launched in 1566. Built during the Northern Seven Years' War to convoy merchant ships involved in the Baltic maritime trade, Adler von Lübeck never saw combat since Lübeck had already entered into peace negotiations with Sweden at the time of the ship's completion. After the Treaty of Stettin was signed in 1570, she was converted into a cargo ship for trade with the Iberian Peninsula, and was broken up in 1588 after over two decades of service.

== Dimensions ==
The Lübeck chronicler Peter van der Horst — relying on the building contract of the ship — gave the following dimensions of Adler von Lübeck:

- Length of head knee: 10.45 m (18 ells)
- Length of keel: 36 m (62 ells)
- Length from stern post to stern post: 49 m (85 ells)
- Length from head knee to stern gallery: 64 m (111 ells)
- Length overall: 78.30 m (256.9 ft)
- Clear beam inboards: 13.84 m (24 ells)
- Beam inboards: 13.84 m (48 ft)
- Beam: 14.50 m
- Height overall: 62.15 m

The gun arrangements of the ship have been preserved in the artillery manual of the artillery master Hans Frese.

== Gallery ==
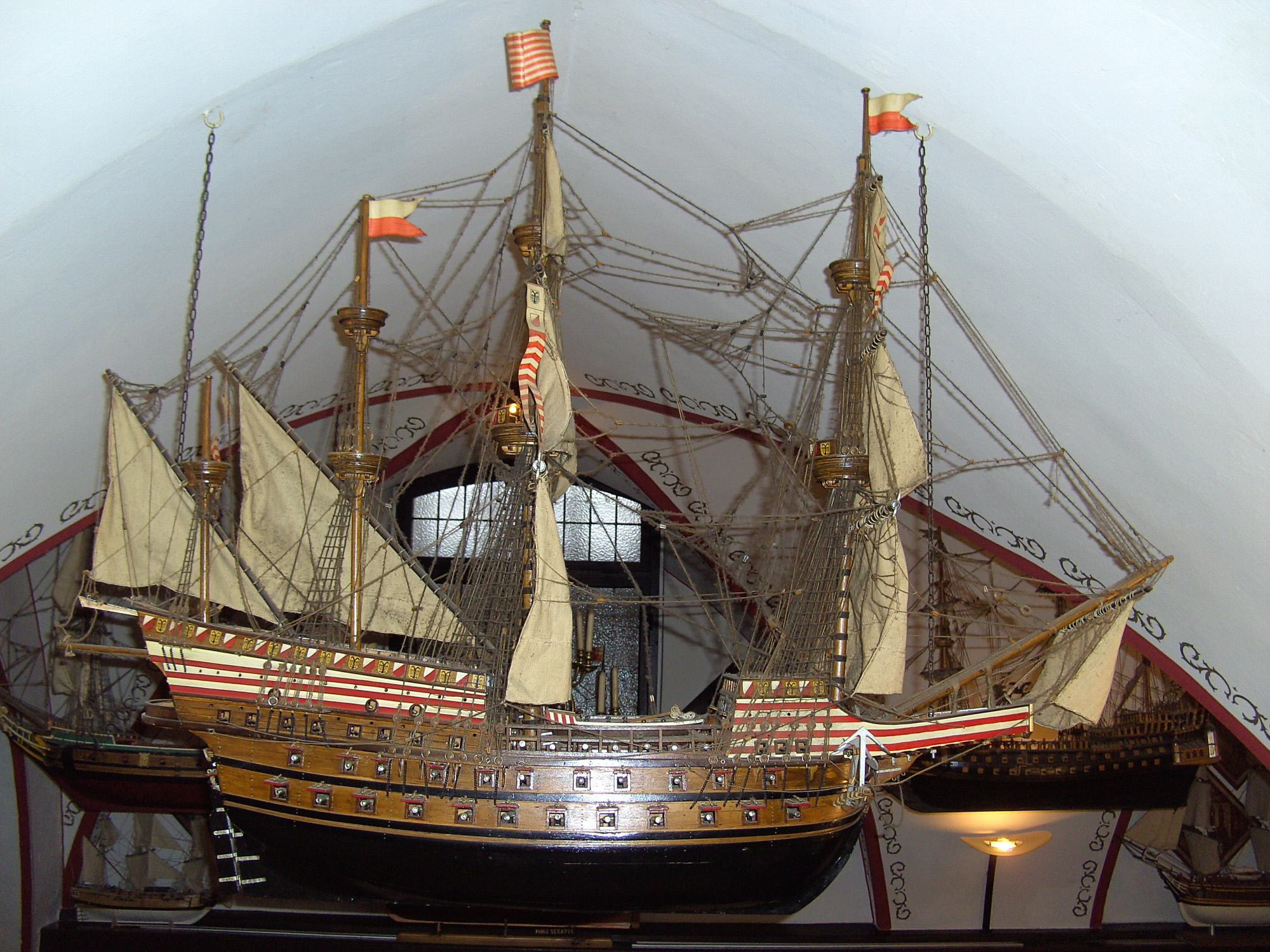
Model ship #1 in the Ratskeller at Lübeck

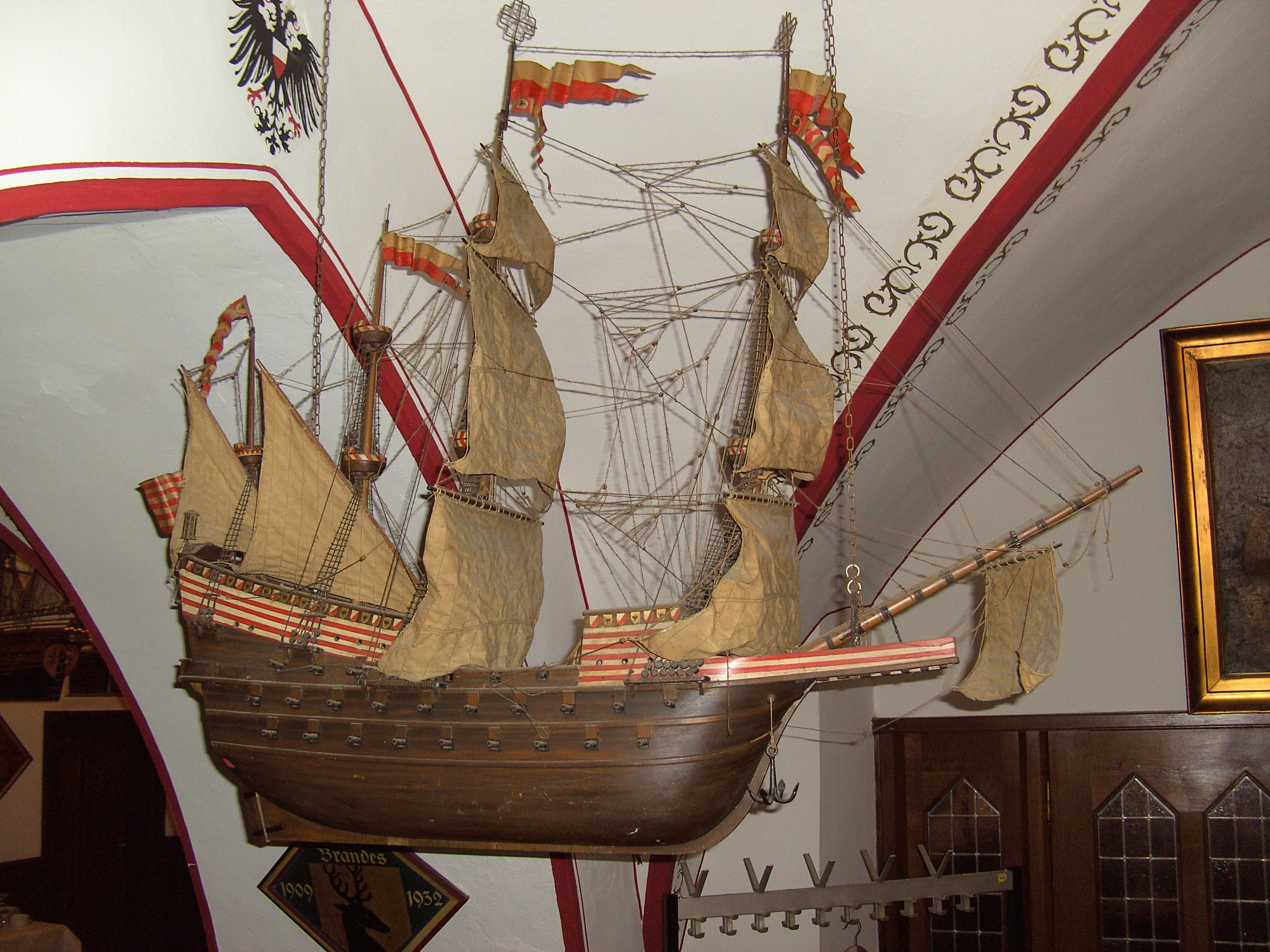
Model ship #2 in the Ratskeller at Lübeck

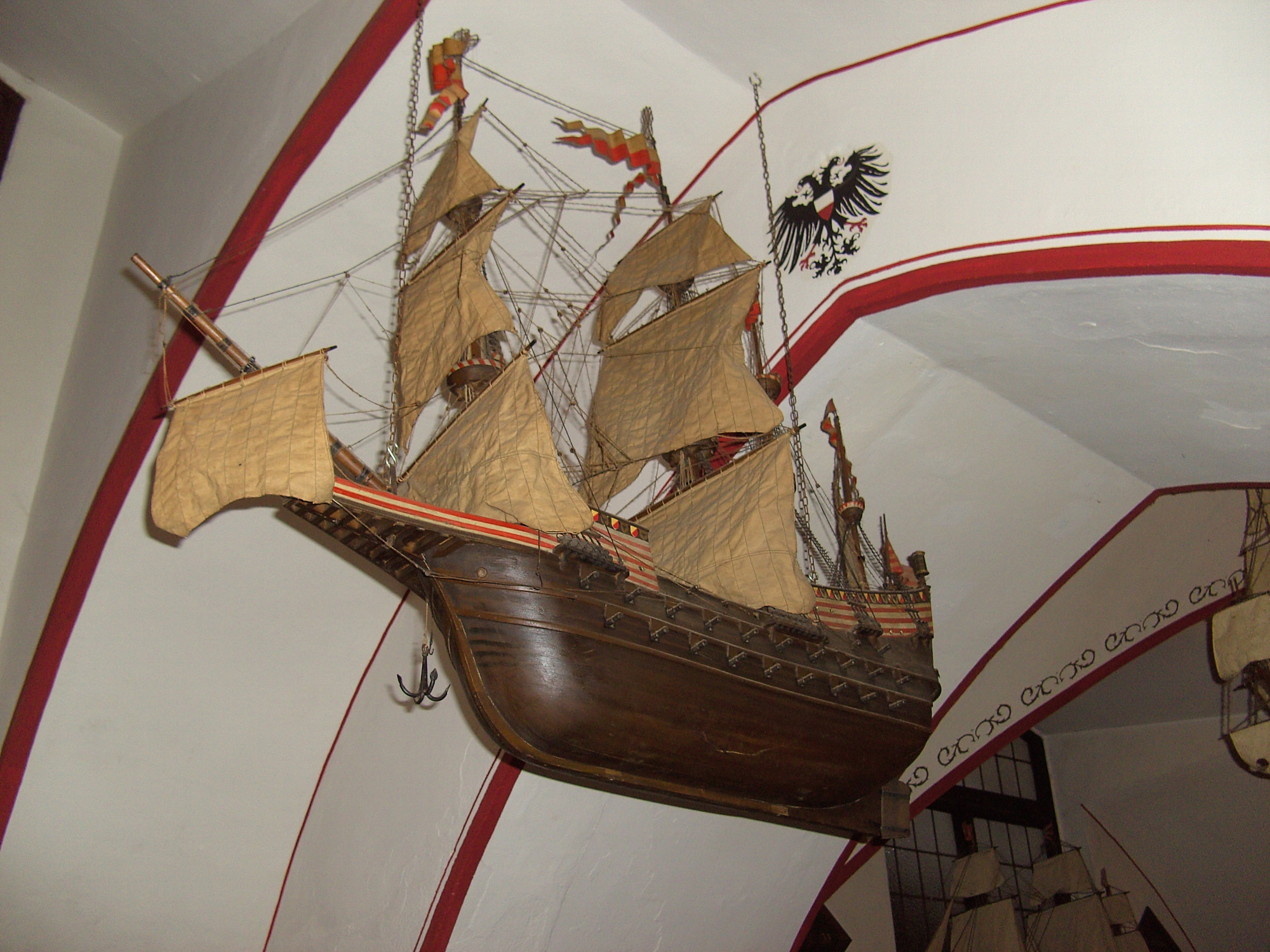
Model ship #2 in the Ratskeller at Lübeck

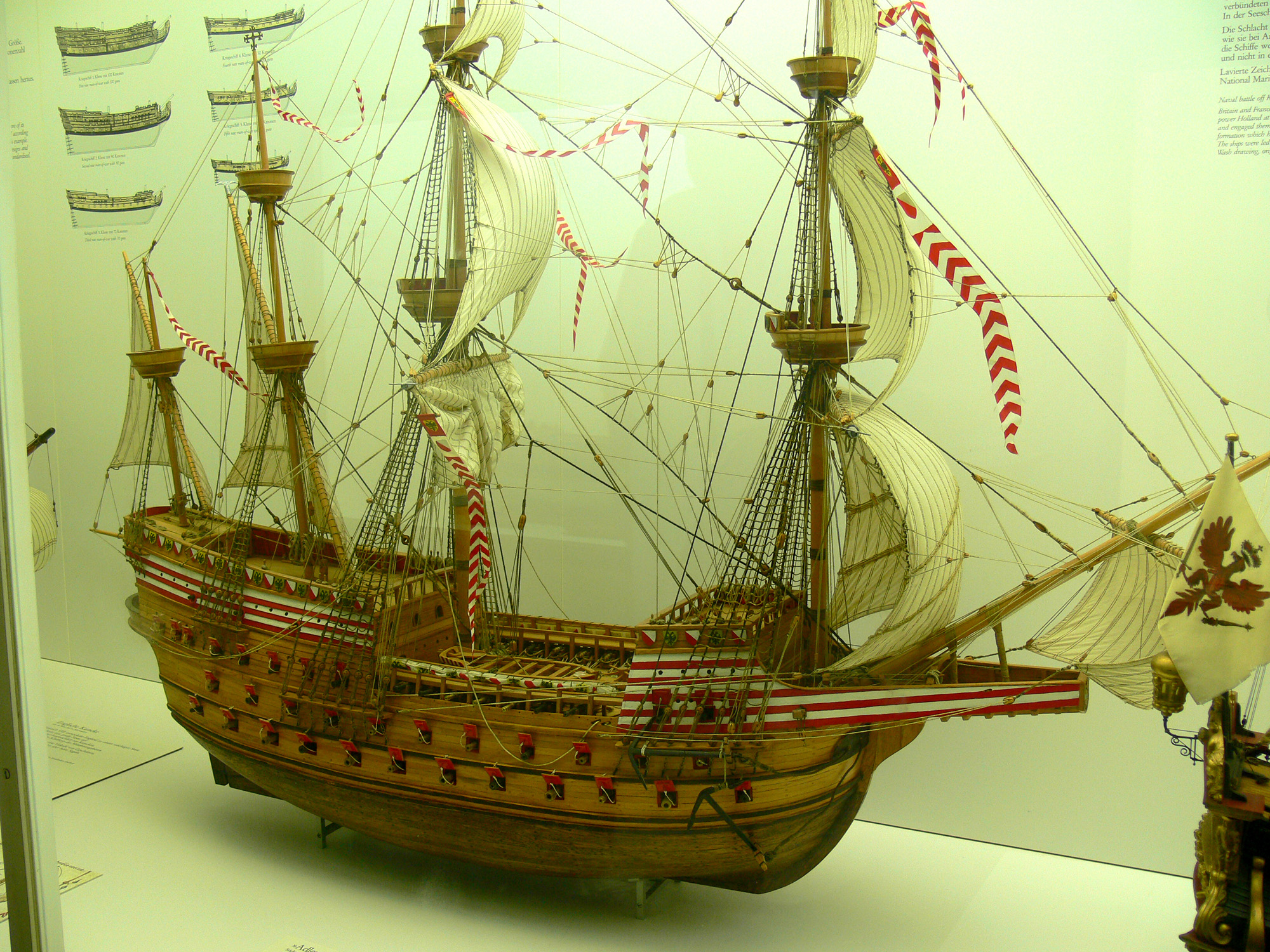
Model ship in the Deutsches Museum at München

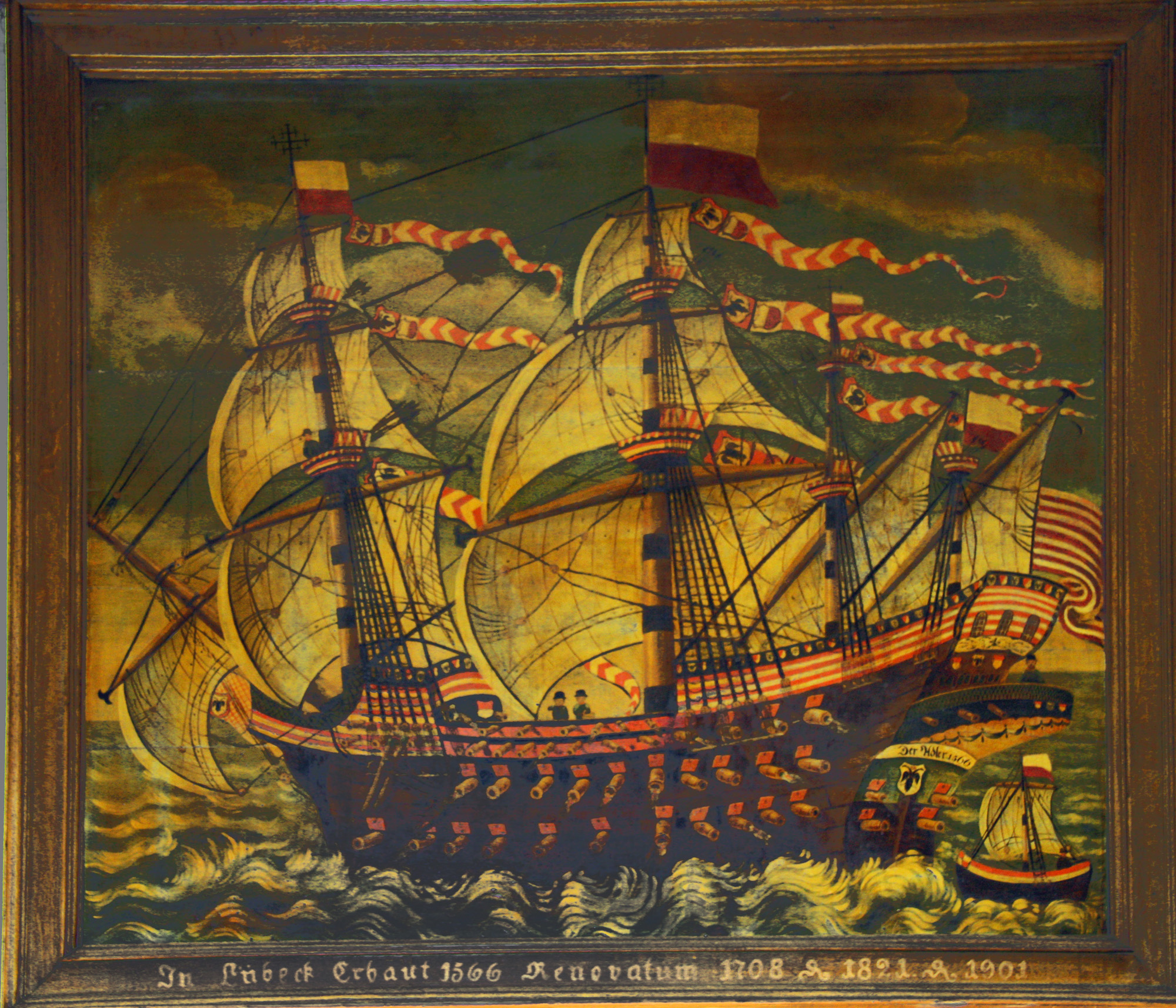
Painting in the Schiffergesellschaft at Lübeck

Pintle and gudgeon rudder as used by the Adler

== See also ==
- List of world's largest wooden ships
- List of ships of the Hanseatic League
