= Portuguese galleon Santa Rosa =

History

Portugal
- Name: Santa Rosa
- Owner: Portuguese Navy
- Port of registry: Lisbon, Kingdom of Portugal
- Builder: Ribeira das Naus
- In service: 1715
- Fate: Sank after an explosion 6 September 1726

General characteristics
- Type: Galleon
- Tons burthen: 1100 bm
- Length: 56 metres (183 ft 9 in)
- Decks: 2
- Installed power: 3 Masts
- Crew: c. 700
- Armament: 56 to 70 cannons
- Notes: Captain Bartolomeu Freire de Araújo

Santa Rosa was a Portuguese galleon that exploded and sank in the Atlantic Ocean off Recife, colony of Brazil, while she was on a voyage from Salvador, Brazil, to Lisbon, Portugal, under the command of Captain Bartolomeu Freire de Araújo.

== Construction ==
Santa Rosa was built in 1715 at the Ribeira das Naus shipyard in Lisbon, Portugal for the Portuguese Navy. She was 56 metres (183 ft 9 in) long, had three masts, and was armed with 56 to 70 cannons.

== Battle of Matapan ==
On 19 July 1717 Santa Rosa took part in the Battle of Matapan (now Tenaro, Greece) in the Portuguese wing coalition organized by Pope Clement XI against the Turks during the Ottoman–Venetian War (1714–18). After her return to Portugal, she went on different escort missions to fight against pirates. She was also frequently used to protect the yearly fleets to Brazil.

== Sinking ==
On 20 March 1726, a fleet of 18 ships left Portugal for Brazil. Amongst them were two warships: Santa Rosa and Nossa Senhora da Nazaré. Santa Rosa, the mightiest ship in colonial Portugal's navy under the command of Captain Bartolomeu Freire de Araújo, was assigned to escort the Portuguese fleet bringing the wealth of the New World back to Portugal. The fleet reached Salvador, Brazil, after two months and four days at sea on 24 May 1726.

In the two and a half following months, Santa Rosa was involved in a lot of loading and unloading procedures. Amongst the cargo spread over the two warships were 27,000 rolls of tobacco, 13,000 boxes of sugar, 20,000 hides, thousands of coconuts, a large number of logs, some 10 tons of gold in bullion and coins, diamonds and gems, between 70 and 200 barrels of gunpowder and a regiment of Portuguese soldiers along with other passengers.

The fleet was reassembled and left the Brazilian port of Salvador on 24 August 1726, exactly three months after their arrival.

The following day, on 25 August 1726, a strong storm hit the fleet and forced the fleet to separate into two different groups. The storm held on for several days before dying down; after the storm Santa Rosa escorted a group of ships to return to the original route.

Two weeks after they had left Salvador, Brazil, on 6 September 1726. Just as the ship passed Recife, Brazil, the gunpowder in its hold blew up and the ship sank, killing all but seven of the 700 men, women and children aboard. The seven survivors (who were all male) clamped on to the ship's wreckage and were rescued the following day; it is believed more people survived the explosion but perished when they were overcome by fatigue or by injury of shark attacks. The rest of the fleet reached Lisbon, Portugal, on 17 November 1726, but of the seven rescued men only three survived the trip.

Even to this day it is unknown how the gunpowder exploded. But some theories have been put forward. The most believed theory is that Captain Bartolomeu Freire de Araújo had been having some heated discussions with the commander of the Portuguese regiment that were on board the ship. After the discussion someone of the regiment went down to the ship's magazine, where all the gunpowder was held, only to light a fire and explode the magazine. There were 70 fire hydrants on board, which means the magazine must have had between 70 and 200 barrels of gunpowder at the time.
