= Sigyn (ship) =

Wooden barque launched in 1887

Coordinates: 60°26′10″N 22°14′14″E

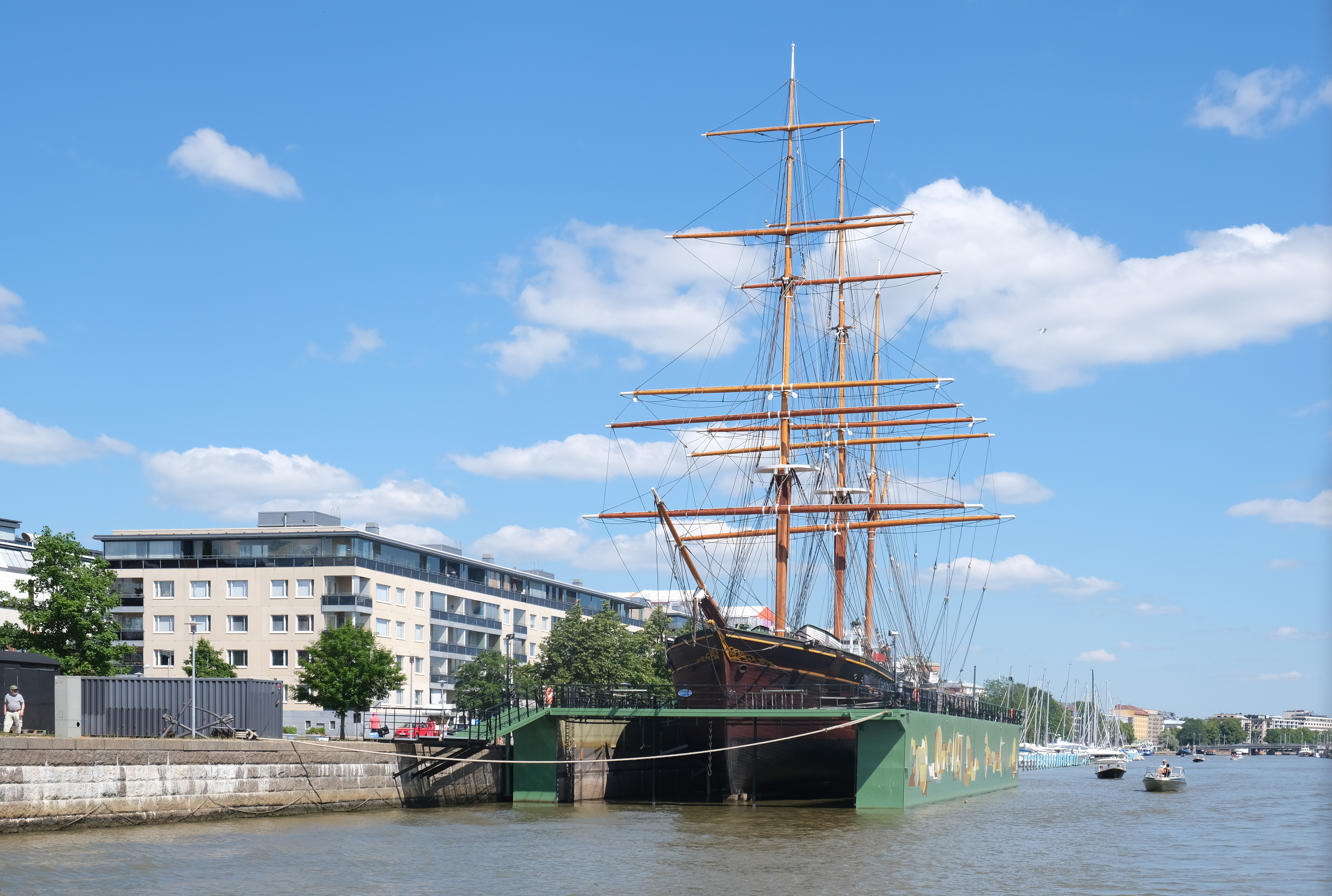
- Sigyn in the Aura River in Turku (2021)

History

Finland
- Name: Sigyn
- Launched: 1887
- Maiden voyage: Gothenburg-Southampton 1887
- In service: 1887–1938
- Identification: IMO number: 8640325
- Status: Museum ship

General characteristics
- Tonnage: 378 GRT; 356 NRT; 500 DWT tonnes
- Length: LOA 57.5 m, LWL 42.7
- Beam: 9 m
- Draught: 4.0 m (fully loaded)
- Propulsion: sails only
- Sail plan: barque, sail area 1000 m^{2}
- Speed: best day average 11.5 knots
- Crew: 10–11

Sigyn, built in Gothenburg 1887, now museum ship in Turku, is the last remaining wooden barque used for trade across the oceans. At the time she was built there were thousands of similar vessels, but she was one of the last to be built. She was quite small even for her time, considering she was built for long-distance trade, but well built and considered fast and beautiful.

== As merchant ship ==
In these times the steam ships were taking over the most important routes; the Suez Canal was already built and the Panama Canal was planned. The tonnage of steam ships passed that of sailing ships in 1890, ten and thirty years later in Sweden and Finland respectively. On the other hand, this was the time when big barques of steel were built. Sigyn was planned for another niche: the small size and small draught made her suited to also use small remote harbours.

The first decade Sigyn sailed on the Atlantic on tramp trade, mostly with wood (pine, spruce, pitch pine, mahogany, cedar), but also e.g. coal, probably sugar, once even hay. In 1897 she made one journey to Bangkok. After 1900 she sailed mostly in European waters.

After being severely damaged while seeking shelter outside Kristiansand 1913, Sigyn was rerigged as a barquentine. She was already old for being a softwood ship and the freight prices on ocean trade were declining, so a cheaper rig suited for coastal trade on the Baltic and North Sea seemed appropriate. This changed with the World War: transatlantic trade became very profitable and she crossed the Atlantic 12 times in 1915 and 1916.

After Sigyn ran aground in 1917 the copper hooding protecting against shipworm was removed and sold. Sigyn was thus no longer fit for the oceans. She was bought by Salsåkers ångsåg, a Swedish sawmill by the Gulf of Bothnia.

In 1927 Sigyn was sold to Finland, like many other sailing ships in these times, when steel and steam were taking over in richer countries. The buyer Arthur Lundqvist from Vårdö in the Åland islands was one of the last big peasant shipowners. The shipping companies of the family remain as Lundqvistrederierna.

== As museum ship ==
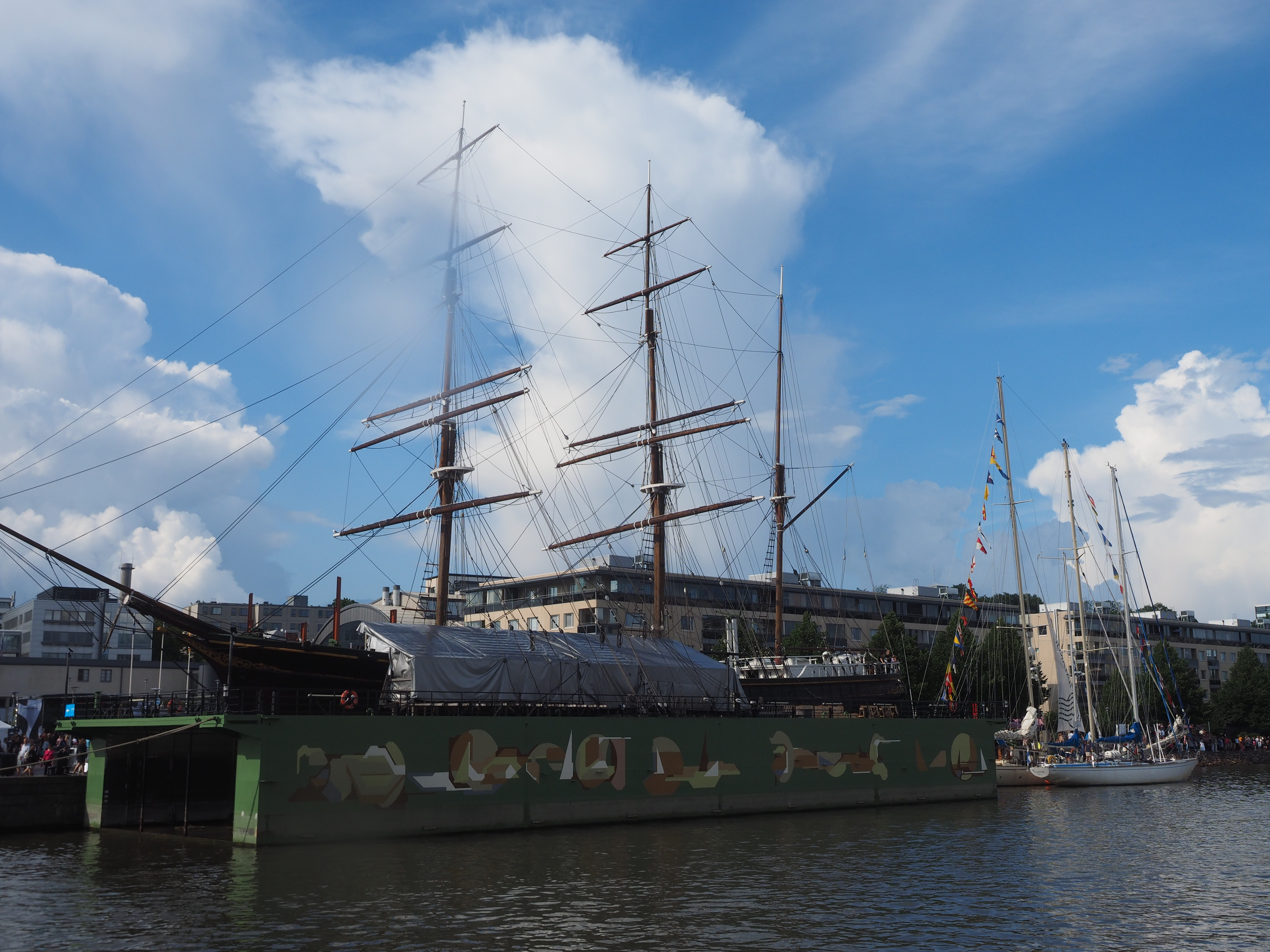
Sigyn in Turku in July 2024

As representative for "nautical circles" Otto Andersson, rector of Åbo Akademi, proposed 1936 the foundation of a maritime museum in Turku. A museum ship was needed and Sigyn was soon considered the best alternative. At that time there were only a few museum ships worldwide and Sigyn was to be the first in Finland.

Sigyn was bought 1939 and opened for the public 3 June 1939. Before the end of the year the Winter War begun, followed by the Continuation War. Sigyn was damaged, and there was a severe lack of funds and people for her maintenance.

After the wars there were negotiations about Sigyn sailing as merchant ship again and thus earning the needed money herself. There was a shortage of tonnage after the war, so this would be profitable, but risky. The proposition was eventually turned down and Sigyn was repaired by donated money. 1948 she was again opened for visitors. In 1950 she even sailed on Airisto outside Turku as part of a film, Laivan kannella (Sigyn had had such a role once before, 1916 for Terje Vigen).

Sigyn's hull was partly renewed 1971–1972 at the Suomenlinna shipyard. Funds were not sufficient though and not until 1979 was Sigyn reopened for the public, now again as a barque. By 1994 Sigyn's hull was weakened by constant flexing, and a floating dock called "Loke" was constructed to help reduce the problem. Sigyn's hull was again renewed 1998–2001, now to a big part. This work was carried out at Sjökvarteret in Mariehamn, where Albanus and Linden had been built and thus much knowledge about wooden ships acquired. Some work has also been done in Turku, where Sigyn now is moored by Forum Marinum in the Aura River.

== See also ==
- Charles W. Morgan, wooden whaling barque built 1841
