= German naval ship Mühlhausen =

German naval minesweeper

History

Germany
- Name: Walther von Ledebur (1967-1994); Mühlhausen (1995-2007)
- Namesake: Mühlhausen
- Builder: Burmester-Werft, Bremen
- Launched: 30 June 1966
- Commissioned: 1967
- Decommissioned: 2007
- Reclassified: Training & support ship for mine-clearing divers (1995)
- Refit: Peene-Werft shipyard, Wolgast (1994-1995)

General characteristics
- Tonnage: 854 GRT
- Length: 63.16 m (207 ft 3 in)
- Beam: 10.84 m (35 ft 7 in)
- Draft: 2.9 m (9 ft 6 in)
- Propulsion: 2 Maybach diesel engines, 1,912 kW each
- Complement: 34 + 15
- Notes: 1 recompression chamber for 6 divers

Mühlhausen was a naval ship in service with the German Navy. The ship was launched June 30, 1966 at the Burmester Werft in Bremen with the name Walther von Ledebur. She was a prototype of a new class of ocean-going minesweepers, which however was not accepted by the Bundesmarine. She was commissioned in 1967 and served with a civilian crew as a trials ship for the Wehrtechnische Dienststelle (Defence Technology Agency) until decommissioning in 1994. She had the pennant number A1410 and was categorized as a Type 742 class ship.

After her decommissioning the German Navy decided to convert her into a training and support vessel for mine-clearing divers. The rebuilding was done at the Peene-Werft shipyard in Wolgast and on April 6, 1995 she was recommissioned as Mühlhausen (M1052) and classified as Type 742A ship.

After forty years in service, the Mühlhausen was decommissioned in 2007 and was replaced by the converted Frankenthal-class minehunter Rottweil.

At the time of her decommissioning, Mühlhausen was the largest naval ship still in service with a hull made of glued laminated timber (mahogany).
