= HMS Mersey (1858) =

Frigate of the Royal Navy

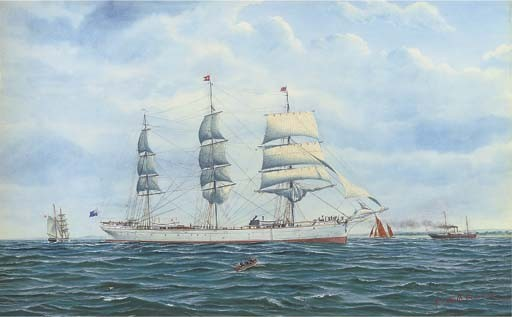
- The training ship Mersey

History

United Kingdom
- Ordered: 31 March 1855
- Builder: Chatham Dockyard
- Cost: £173,898
- Laid down: 26 December 1856
- Launched: 13 August 1858
- Completed: 21 April 1859 at Portsmouth Dockyard
- Commissioned: 5 March 1858
- Fate: Sold for breaking up 23 January 1875

General characteristics
- Displacement: 5,643 tons
- Tons burthen: 3,733 tons BM
- Length: 336 ft 9 in (102.64 m) overall, 300 ft 9.5 in (91.681 m) gundeck, 264 ft 7.25 in (80.6514 m) keel
- Beam: 52 ft (16 m)
- Draught: 29 ft (8.8 m)
- Depth of hold: 19 ft 11 in (6.07 m)
- Propulsion: sails; 1000 shp auxiliary steam engine.
- Speed: 13.29kts on trial
- Endurance: 145 hours at full steam
- Complement: around 600
- Armament: 1859: Upper deck: 12 x 8in/68-pounder shell guns; Main Deck:28 x 10in shell guns
- Armour: none

The second HMS Mersey was commissioned in 1858, six years after the first Mersey had been broken up. She and her sister ship the Orlando were the longest wooden warships built for the Royal Navy. At 336 feet in length, HMS Mersey was nearly twice the size of HMS Victory, the flagship of Admiral Horatio Nelson at the Battle of Trafalgar. At 5643 tons displacement, she was certainly a large and impressive looking ship in her day. She was heavily armed, and in comparison to many of her counterparts was quite fast with an approximate speed of 12½ knots, achieving 13½ on trials.

The length, the unique aspect of the ship, was actually an Achilles' heel of the Mersey and Orlando. The extreme length of the ship put enormous strains on her hull due to the unusual merging of heavy machinery, and a lengthy wooden hull, resulting in her seams opening up. They were pushing the limits of what was possible in wooden ship construction:

Even the biggest of the 5,000-6,000-ton wooden battleships of the mid-to-late 19th century and the 5,000-ton wooden motorships constructed in the United States during World War I did not exceed 340 feet in length or 60 feet in width. The longest of these ships, the Mersey-class frigates, were unsuccessful, and one, HMS Orlando, showed signs of structural failure after an 1863 voyage to the United States. The Orlando was scrapped in 1871 and the Mersey soon after. Both the Mersey-class frigates and the largest of the wooden battleships, the 121-gun Victoria class, required internal iron strapping to support the hull, as did many other ships of this kind. In short, the construction and use histories of these ships indicated that they were already pushing or had exceeded the practical limits for the size of wooden ships.

Britain had built two long frigates in 1858 – HMS Mersey and HMS Orlando – the longest, largest and most powerful single-decked wooden fighting ships. Although only 335 feet long, they suffered from the strain of their length, proving too weak to face a ship of the line in close quarters.

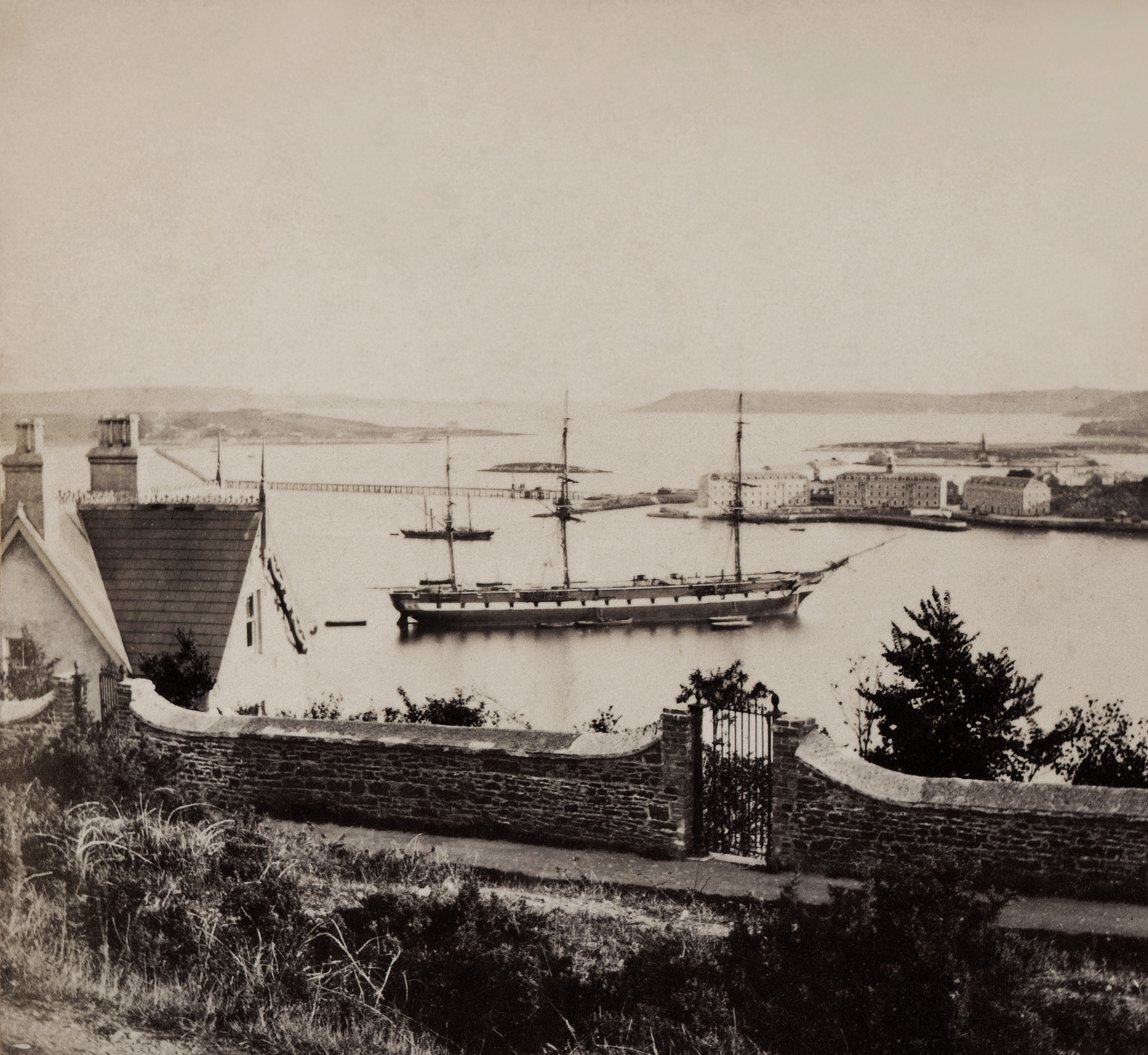
Haulbowline Island and Mersey, in Queenstown Harbour

In 1875 Mersey was laid up and sold for breaking. Some of her masts were installed on HMS Endymion, which was then being refitted at Portsmouth.

== Bibliography ==
- Jones, Colin (1996). "Entente Cordiale, 1865". In McLean, David & Preston, Antony (eds.). Warship 1996. London: Conway Maritime Press. ISBN 0-85177-685-X.
