= French ship Chatham (1810) =

Ship of the line of the French Navy

History

France
- Name: Chatham
- Builder: Glavin, Rotterdam
- Laid down: May 1799
- Launched: 24 May 1800
- Completed: 1801
- Commissioned: July 1810
- Fate: Returned to Dutch control 1 August 1814, broken up 1823

General characteristics
- Displacement: 2900 tonnes
- Tons burthen: 1500 port tonneaux
- Length: 61.5 metres (51.8 at the keel)
- Beam: 14.43 metres
- Draught: 6.23 metres
- Depth: 5.94 metres
- Complement: 18 officers; 650 to 819 men
- Armament: 90 guns on three decks of 30 gun ports each

Chatham was a 90-gun ship of the line, lead ship of her class.

== Career ==
Built for the Batavian Navy, the ship was incorporated in the French Navy when the First French Empire annexed the country. On 10 July, she was appointed to Missiessy's Escaults squadron. In April, her armament was reduced by ten guns, removed from the upper deck.

She was returned to the Dutch Navy in 1814, and was broken up in 1823.
