= Morning Light (ship) =

History

United Kingdom
- Name: Morning Light
- Owner: William and Richard Wright, Jacob Valentine Troop, William Thomson
- Builder: William and Richard Wright, Wilmot, Nova Scotia
- Laid down: 1855
- Launched: 1856

History

Germany
- Owner: Jacob Fritz
- Acquired: 1881
- Out of service: 1889
- Renamed: J.W. Wendt
- Fate: wrecked and abandoned, 1889

General characteristics
- Length: 265.3 ft (80.9 m)
- Beam: 44.1 ft (13.4 m)
- Draught: 21.1 ft (6.4 m)
- Propulsion: sail

Morning Light was a wooden sailing ship. Her size was 265.3' by 44.1' by 21.1'. Launched in 1856, she weighed 2377 tons. She was registered at Saint John, New Brunswick until 1867. She was made of tamarack, oak, birch and pitch pine. Her last voyage was in 1889. She was wrecked and abandoned. Her last known cargo was iron and oil.

== History ==
The brothers William and Richard Wright built Morning Light of tamarack, oak, birch and pitch pine. They were a team of shipbuilders and businessmen who built an average of almost two vessels per year over the course of 16 years. Morning Light was the last one they constructed. Slightly larger than their penultimate ship White Star, Morning Light was the largest vessel in British North America when she was built in 1855. The ship was launched from Wilmot, Nova Scotia in 1856. Morning Light was mostly used by merchants transporting goods between Saint John, New Brunswick, and Liverpool, England. As with many ships, she had many different owners such as Jacob Valentine Troop and William Thomson and Jacob Fritz. Jacob V. Troop was one of the most important men in the shipbuilding industry in the 1800s and he owned many vessels, which he used to run his business. The builder of Morning Light was unknown in Canada because from July 1855, registers did not mention the name of the builders of the vessels in New Brunswick. However, Lloyd's of London had appointed inspectors to survey vessels being built in New Brunswick in 1851. Morning Light remained on the Saint John register until 1867, when her registration was transferred to Liverpool, England. From there she was sold to a German company in 1881 and her name changed to J.W. Wendt. On February 21, 1889, she left Bremen, Germany for New York City carrying iron and oil. A month later she was found ashore three miles north of Barnegat, New Jersey. She had been stranded and wrecked in a gale.
