= HNoMS Kong Sverre =

History

Norway
- Name: Kong Sverre
- Launched: 23 October 1860
- Commissioned: 1864
- Fate: Sold and scrapped 1932

General characteristics
- Type: Frigate
- Displacement: 3,475 long tons (3,531 t)
- Length: 64.9 m (212 ft 11 in) w/l
- Beam: 15.1 m (49 ft 6 in)
- Draught: 6.61 m (21 ft 8 in)
- Propulsion: Steam engines, 500 hp (373 kW)
- Sail plan: Sail area, 2,319 m^{2} (24,960 sq ft)
- Speed: 11.4 knots (13.1 mph; 21.1 km/h) under power
- Complement: 550
- Armament: 2 × 20 cm (7.9 in) rifled guns; 30 × 60-pounder guns; 12 × 15.5 cm (6.1 in) rifled guns; 4 × 12-pounder haubitz guns; 2 × 6-pounder rifled guns

HNoMS Kong Sverre (His Norwegian Majesty's Ship Kong Sverre) was a steam and sail powered frigate built for the Royal Norwegian Navy, and launched in 1860. Conceived and designed as possibly the most advanced wooden naval ship built, she was obsolete by the time she was delivered.

In 1932, an effort was made to raise 30,000 Norwegian kroner in order to preserve the ship, but it failed and she was eventually scrapped.
