= Isis (ship) =

Large Roman ship in the Mediterranean c. 150

History

Roman Empire
- Name: Isis
- Namesake: Isis

General characteristics
- Type: Alexandrian grain ship
- Tonnage: c.1,200 t (1,181 long tons)
- Displacement: Unknown
- Length: 180 ft (55 m)
- Beam: c.45 ft (14 m)
- Depth of hold: 44 ft (13 m)

The Roman ship Isis was a very large ship that operated on the Mediterranean during the Roman Empire around 150 AD, carrying grain from Egypt to Italy. The Isis was apparently 55 meters (180 feet) long and had a beam of 13.7 meters (45 feet). Its cargo hold was 13.4 meters (44 feet) deep. It has a carrying capacity of 1200 short tons or 1,071 long tonnes.

In his book Πλοἶον ἢ Εὐχαί ("The Ship, or The Wishes") the sophist Lucian described the Isis when he saw it in Athens' seaport Piraeus:

I say, though, what a size that ship was! 180 feet long, the man said, and something over a quarter of that in width; and from deck to keel, the maximum depth, through the hold, 44 feet. And then the height of the mast, with its huge yard; and what a forestay it takes to hold it! And the lofty stern with its gradual curve, and its gilded beak, balanced at the other end by the long rising sweep of the prow, and the figures of her name-goddess, Isis, on either side. As to the other ornamental details, the paintings and the scarlet topsail, I was more struck by the anchors, and the capstans and windlasses, and the stern cabins. The crew was like a small army. And they were saying she carried as much corn (Note: At that time, "corn" was a generic term for various cereal grains.) as would feed every soul in Attica for a year. And all depends for its safety on one little old atomy of a man, who controls that great rudder with a mere broomstick of a tiller! He was pointed out to me; Heron was his name...

The wreck of the Isis was discovered by Robert Ballard in 1989 off the coast of Sicily.

== See also ==
- Syracusia
- Jong (ship)
- Timeline of largest passenger ships
- List of world's largest wooden ships
- Ships of ancient Rome
