= French ship Royal Hollandais (1810) =

Ship of the line of the French Navy

History

France
- Name: Royal Hollandais
- Builder: Glavin, Rotterdam
- Laid down: 1797
- Launched: 1799
- Commissioned: July 1810
- Fate: Decommissioned 1819

General characteristics
- Class & type: Chatham class ship of the line
- Displacement: 2900 tonnes
- Tons burthen: 1500 port tonneaux
- Length: 61.5 metres (51.8 at the keel)
- Beam: 14.43 metres
- Draught: 6.23 metres
- Depth: 5.94 metres
- Complement: 18 officers; 650 to 819 men
- Armament: 90 guns on three decks of 30 gun ports each

Royal Hollandais was a 90-gun Chatham-class ship of the line.

== Career ==
Built for the Batavian Navy as De Ruyter and renamed Koninklijke Hollander after the establishment of the Kingdom of Holland in 1806, the ship was incorporated in the French Navy as Royal Hollandais when the First French Empire annexed the country. In 1811, that name was shortened to Hollandais. On 10 July, she was appointed to Édouard Thomas Burgues de Missiessy's squadron.

She was returned to the Royal Netherlands Navy in 1814 and was decommissioned in 1819.
