= Caligula's Giant Ship =

Ruined Roman barge

Caligula's 'Giant Ship', also known as the 'Round Ship', was an extremely large barge, the ruins of which were found during the construction of Rome's Leonardo da Vinci International Airport in Fiumicino, Italy, in the 1950s. This was previously a Roman port a few kilometers north of Ostia at the mouth of the Tiber River. The ship was dated to c. 37 AD using dendrochronological dating methods. Based on engineering records, these ships served as grand, immobile stages for imperial indulgence, far removed from actual seafaring vessels, embodying Caligula's extravagant and decadent rule.

This Roman barge allegedly had a length of about 312 feet (95.10 m) and a beam of about 69 feet (21.03 m). It was probably able to carry 1,300 tons of cargo.

According to Pliny, this or a similar ship was used to transport the obelisk in St. Peter's Square from Egypt on the orders of Emperor Caligula.

== See also ==
- Caligula
- Nemi ships
