= Trio (trimaran) =

Trio was an historic 20 ft (6.1 m) trimaran sailboat derived from design by Lock Crowther and built by Howard Stephenson in 1962 using the hull of an Austral 20.

Meanwhile, Lockie's larger tri, which he named Kraken, was performing well on the Gippsland Lakes. Admittedly the only competition came from Lightweight Sharpies and Flying Dutchmen, so it was hard to gain a comparison with other similar boats — C-Class catamarans, for instance. In due course I finished my boat. It should have been up with his, at least in light airs but, partly because of my inexperience, my Trio was hardly ever a match for the bigger tri. There was one occasion when Trio beat them all, Kraken included: one of the Gippsland Lakes Yacht Club's annual long-distance races. The course was set from the yacht club at Paynesville, south-west along Lake Victoria to Waddy Point and return, a round-trip of about 15 nautical miles. As there was a gentle south-easterly sea-breeze that day, the course was virtually two long reaches, with no tacking and just a gybe at Waddy Point. We won easily, in record time.

— Howard Stephenson

== See also ==
- List of multihulls
- Kraken 25
- Lock Crowther
