= Kraken 18 =

Development
- Designer: Lock Crowther
- Location: Australia
- Year: ca. early 1960s
- Role: day racer
- Name: Kraken 18

Boat
- Crew: 2

Hull
- Type: Open trimaran
- Construction: Two layers of 1/12" veneer cold-moulded over a simple male mold.
- LOA: 18 ft (5.5 m)
- Beam: 11 ft (3.4 m)

Hull appendages
- Keel: centreboard

Rig
- Rig type: Fractional Bermuda or Marconi rig

Sails
- Upwind sail area: 227 sq ft (21.1 m^{2}) (sloop rig - racing); 167 sq ft (15.5 m^{2}) (small headsail)
- Total sail area: 227 sq ft (21.1 m^{2})

Kraken 18 was a day racing trimaran sailboat designed by Lock Crowther in the wake of his successful Bunyip 20 design, as a scaled-down version of the earlier Kraken 25 with similar performance. Its smaller size and folding beams made it more practical and led to its greater success.

Advertised as "a slightly faster, more attractive version of the Bunyip 20 with round bilge hulls", it shared an identical rig with the Bunyip 20 but was 2 ft (0.61 m) shorter.

It was accepted as a class by the Victoria branch of Trimaran Association of Australia, making it the first one design trimaran class in Australian history.

== See also ==
- List of multihulls
- Kraken 25
- Kraken 33
- Kraken 40
- Lock Crowther
- Trimaran Yacht Club of Victoria
