= Eggnog (disambiguation) =

Eggnog is a beverage traditionally made with milk and/or cream, sugar, whipped eggs and sometimes distilled spirits.

Eggnog may also refer to:

- Eggnog, Utah, an unincorporated community in Garfield County
- Eggnog (album), a 1991 EP by the Melvins
- Eggnog Riot or Grog Mutiny, a riot at the United States Military Academy in West Point, New York, in 1826
- EggNOG (database), a database of biological information hosted by the EMBL
- Egg Nog (trimaran), the first trimaran sailboat designed by Victor Tchetchet in the 1950s with the name Egg Nog
- Egg Nog II (trimaran), the second trimaran sailboat designed by Victor Tchetchet in the 1950s with the name Egg Nog
