= Kraken 25 =

Development
- Designer: Lock Crowther
- Location: Australia
- Year: ca. early 1960s
- Role: day racer
- Name: Kraken 25

Boat
- Crew: 2-3

Hull
- Type: Open trimaran
- Construction: Two layers of 1/10" veneer cold-moulded over a simple male mold.
- LOA: 25 ft (7.6 m)
- Beam: 14 ft (4.3 m)

Hull appendages
- Keel: centreboard

Rig
- Rig type: Fractional Bermuda or Marconi rig

Sails
- Upwind sail area: 300 sq ft (28 m^{2}) ("she has a small headsail for heavy weather")
- Total sail area: 300 sq ft (28 m^{2})

Kraken 25 was a day racing trimaran sailboat designed by Lock Crowther in the wake of his successful Bunyip 20 design.

Advertised as "Virtually a C Class trimaran of unbelievable light weather performance and good heavy weather performance [...] the trimaran for racing enthusiasts who want to show up the local catamarans".

== See also ==
- List of multihulls
- Lock Crowther
- Kraken 18
- Kraken 33
- Kraken 40
