= Austral 20 =

Austral 20 may refer to:

- The Austral 20 (catamaran), a catamaran built by Charles Cunningham
- The Austral 20 (trailer sailer), a small sailboat built by Austral Yachts
