= Henk de Velde =

Dutch seafarer (1949–2022)

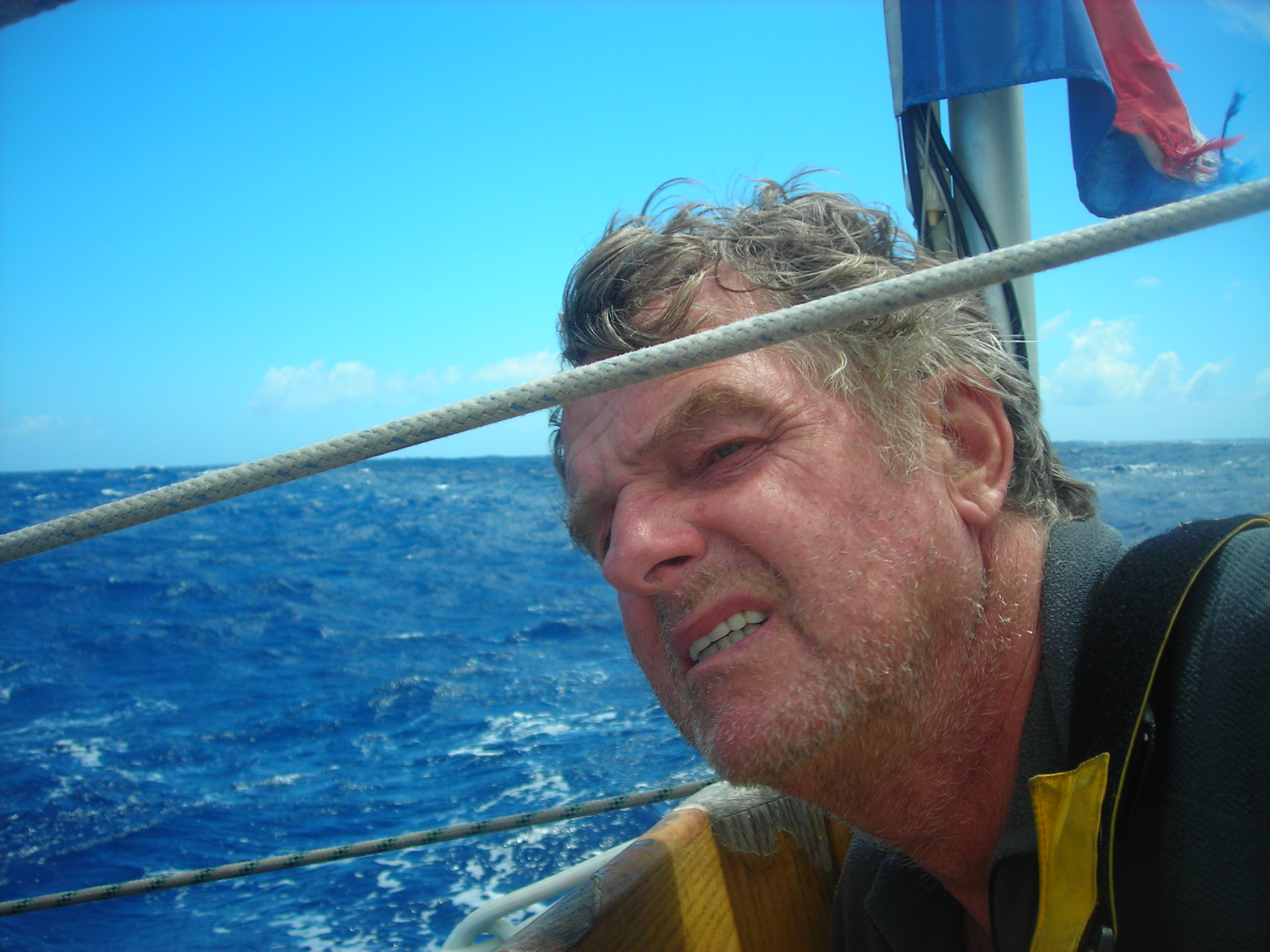
Henk de Velde (2009)

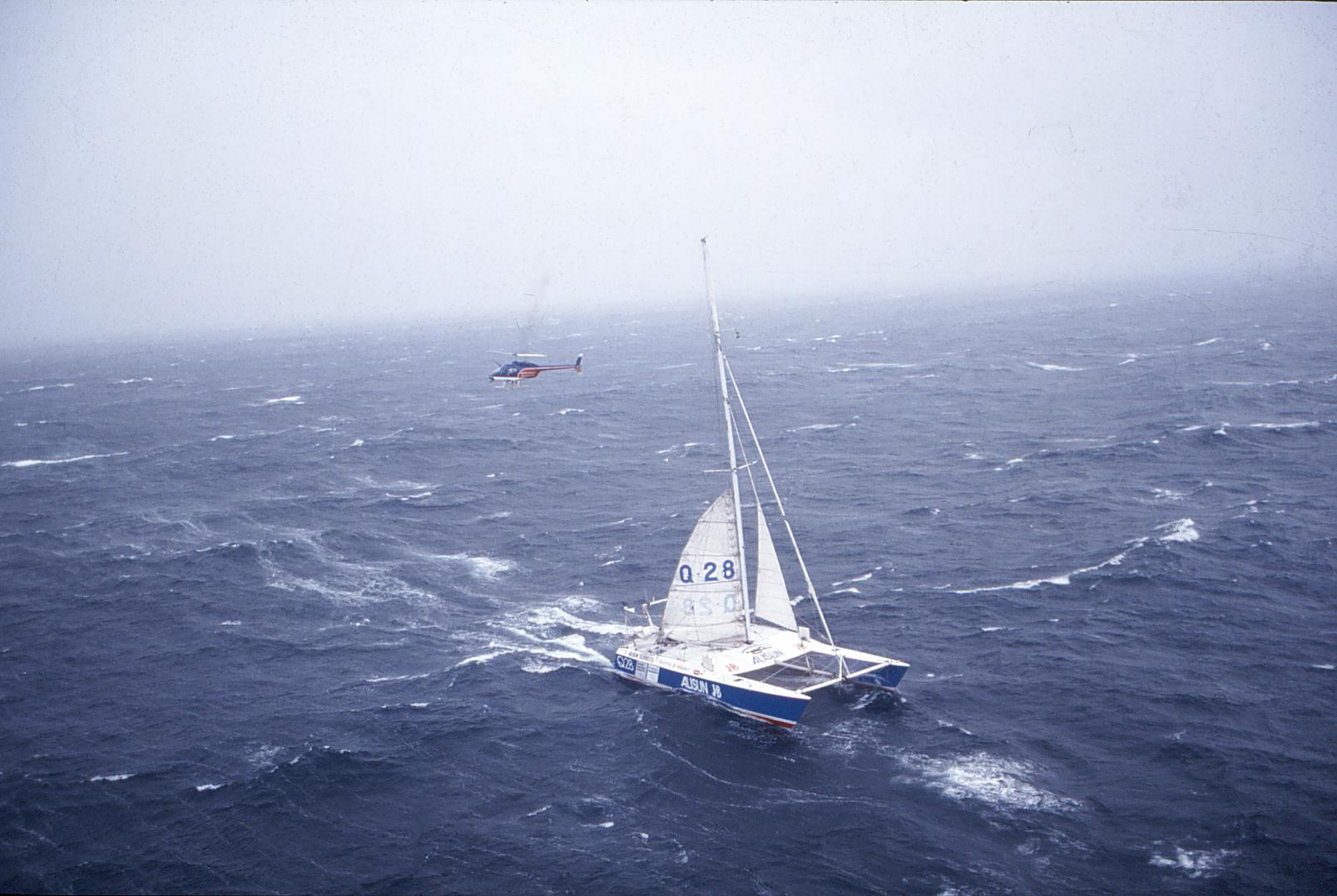
Alisun J&B

Henk de Velde (12 January 1949 – 3 November 2022) was a Dutch seafarer. He was especially known for his long solo-voyages around the world.

Initially he worked for thirteen years in the merchant navy, from able-bodied seaman to captain. When he was 28 he chose definitively for ocean-sailing. In 1978, he started with its first voyage around the world, which would eventually take seven years. He made this voyage with his former wife until they separated in 1984. Their son Stefan Vairoa was born on Easter Island in 1981.

In 1985, he returned to the Netherlands. In 1989, he left again for a nonstop circumnavigation with a 60-foot (18 meter) catamaran, called Alisun J&B, and it took him 158 days. He had to stop in New Zealand for repairs. His third voyage, in 1992, with a 60 ft (18 meter) catamaran called Zeeman, was viewed on Dutch TV in the so-called 5 O'clock Show. He was for forty days a missing person because of electric problems and three days before arrival he had a collision with a floating container which left him unconscious. He was eventually rescued by a Russian freighter. With a double skull fracture he was hospitalized on the island of Madeira before returning to the Netherlands. In 1996, he departed with a 71-foot catamaran, called C1000 and sailed in 119 days non stop around the world. Officially he did not break the record because he did not sail under the rules of the WSSRC. He is still the only person in the world who sailed a catamaran nonstop single handed around the world.

In 2001 de Velde started again, with a steel monohull yacht called Campina, this time using a totally new route, instead of west to east or east to west he wanted to sail the world north to south by passing the NE passage north of Siberia. It took him three and a half years. He had to winter near the village of Tiksi in Northern Siberia. Temperatures were between -35 and -60 °C. He stayed on board in the white desert of the Arctic Ocean. In 2004, he got the aid of a Russian nuclear icebreaker Vaigach. The rudders were demolished by heavy ice. In December 2004 he returned with his damaged vessel to the Netherlands. Henk de Velde has written seven books, all in Dutch. In all his writings he contemplates the concept of freedom. He was a philosopher, as well as a sailor, some even calling him a mystic. He directed two documentaries: Sea of Heartbreak (1997) and 1000 days of Loneliness (2005). He worked in close association with the Dutch media.

De Velde departed on his 6th circumnavigation in September 2007 with the trimaran Juniper, without planning to return to the Netherlands. He called this "Never Ending Voyage" a pilgrim's route to the edges of this world. The 52 ft trimaran was designed by Chris White. However, in March 2011, while sailing near Vancouver Island in Canada, he suffered an accident with the vessel, in which the propeller shaft broke from its axis, elbowing up and damaging the aft, a fibreglass predicament. Weeks of repairs ensued, and Henk de Velde counted on many helpful volunteer hands to have the problem fixed up. Perhaps resigning to the fact that the Juniper's speed was deemed never to match the Campina's resilience and livelihood, he then reported that his plans had changed, and that he would eventually return to the Netherlands, noting in an interview soon after, that the time had come "to slow down", and that he was homesick. He returned to the Netherlands in September 2011.

De Velde died of colon cancer on 3 November 2022, at the age of 73.
