= Discovery 20 =

Development
- Designer: Chris White
- Year: Approx. early 1980s
- Name: Discovery 20

Hull
- Type: Cruising trimaran
- Construction: plywood / epoxy
- LOA: 20 ft (6.1 m)
- Beam: 16 ft (4.9 m) (rigged); 8.5 ft (2.6 m) (folded)

Hull appendages
- Keel: daggerboard

Rig
- Rig type: Fractional Bermuda or Marconi rig with gennaker

Sails
- Total sail area: 235 sq ft (21.8 m^{2})

The Discovery 20 is a 1980s era trimaran sailboat design by Chris White.

The Discovery 20 was featured in the Small Trimarans book.

== See also ==
- List of multihulls
- Chris White
- Trimaran
