= Kraken 33 Mk IV =

Australian sailboat

Development
- Designer: Lock Crowther
- Location: Australia
- Year: ca. late 1960s
- Role: ocean racer
- Name: Kraken 33 Mk IV

Boat
- Crew: 4 berths (6 6 ft (1.8 m) headroom)
- Draft: 1.75 ft (0.53 m)

Hull
- Type: trimaran
- Hull weight: 4,000 lb (1,800 kg)
- LOA: 33 ft (10 m)
- LWL: 30 ft (9.1 m)
- Beam: 23 ft (7.0 m)

Sails
- Spinnaker area: 500 sq ft (46 m^{2}) (reacher); 800 sq ft (74 m^{2}) (spinnaker)
- Upwind sail area: 492 sq ft (45.7 m^{2})

Kraken 33 Mk IV was a 4–5 berth ocean racing trimaran designed by Lock Crowther in Australia. It was apparently first built in the 1960s but was advertised in to the 1970s.

== See also ==
- List of multihulls
- Lock Crowther
- Kraken 18
- Kraken 25
- Kraken 40
