= Arthur Piver =

American architect

- Born: 1910
- Died: 1968 (aged 57–58)
- Occupations: Pilot; sailor; author; printshop owner; boatbuilder

Arthur Piver (/ˈpaɪvər/; "Piver rhymes with diver"; 1910–1968) was a World War II pilot, an amateur sailor, author, printshop owner and renowned boatbuilder who lived in Mill Valley on San Francisco Bay and became "the father of the modern multihull."

== Career ==
In the late 1950s and 1960s Piver designed and built a series of simple three-hulled, plywood yachts starting with a 16 footer and culminating in a 64-footer that was built in England for charter in the Caribbean. (The word "trimaran" was coined by Viktor Tchetchet, a Ukrainian emigrant to the US who tested his boats on Long Island sound in the late 1940s.) Piver crossed the Atlantic on his first ocean-going boat, the demountable 30 foot Nimble, departing from Swansea, Mass in spring 1960, stopping in the Azores, and successfully reaching Plymouth, England. He had begun selling do-it-yourself plans through a company called Pi-Craft in 1957. He thought anyone could build one of his boats even if they had no experience. During the winter of 1960/61, Piver built himself a 35-foot ketch-rigged trimaran named Lodestar and starting in the summer of 1961 sailed it from San Francisco to New Zealand through Southern California, Hawaii, and Tahiti. read TransPacific Trimaran. In England, Cox Marine started building his boats and found a ready market, often with Americans who would sail them home. In 1964, Derek Kelsall bought a Lodestar bare hull, completed it with a flush deck, and entered the Observer Single-handed Trans-Atlantic Race. After ten days, he was ahead of Eric Tabarly when he struck some flotsam and broke his daggerboard and rudder. He returned to England for replacements, restarted and still finished in a respectable time.

== Character ==
People who met Piver say he was a social man who enjoyed being the center of attention in his circle of boating friends and felt that the trimaran was his own personal invention. He was the "singlehander" type---he wrote about singlehanding in his books but made only one solo passage and disappeared during that voyage and was never seen again. He also did not believe in using motors and only allowed for the inclusion upon insistence from home builders. Provisions were made for motor wells in his later designs. To him the use of motors was not being a true "sailor". Piver was allegedly driven to enter the Trans-Atlantic solo race because it was the only prestigious long-distance race in the world open to every type of boat.

== Legacy ==
Despite the tragedies encountered on Piver vessels around the time of his death, examples of his boxy cruising designs nonetheless remain in use to this day. They could never sail well upwind but were very stable; many did carry their owners to the tropics and allowed them to fulfill their cruising dreams. Many properly built Piver tris made grueling voyages. Quen Cultra, of landlocked Illinois, built a Lodestar on his backyard farm and sailed it around the world with no prior sailing experience. He survived massive storms and even being hit by a ship. He wrote a book about the voyage titled Queequeg's Odyssey.

A well built Piver, while not as "modern" as new tris, will still hold their own and are quite suitable for cruising, especially when modified with a Norm Cross design "fin keel and large area spade rudder".

Piver's collected papers are preserved at the Mariner's Museum in Newport News, VA.

=== Influence ===
It was Arthur Piver's bang-'em-together, sheet-plywood boats that launched the modern multihull movement in the early Sixties—simultaneously setting its advancement back a dozen years. It wasn't Piver's fault that so many backyard builders erected condominiums atop his slender hulls, giving multihulls an ugly duckling reputation from which they're only now recovering.

— Randy Thomas, Yachting (1985)

=== Public perception ===
Piver's voyages broadened the public perception of seaworthiness for the trimaran concept and in a very short time. Piver designs became incredibly popular and inspired many novices to believe they could build their own boats and set off for the tropics. Thus Arthur Piver could be said to be the man most responsible for popularizing the nautical phenomenon of the cruising multihull.

Trimarans, which have been publicised in largest measure by Piver...

— Edwin Doran Jr., Texas A. & M. University, Journal of the Polynesian Society, Volume 81, No. 2 (1972)

=== Multihull design ===
However, it wasn't long before other designers began developing trimaran designs. By the mid-60s, these included one of his young fans, Jim Brown with the Searunner series that are still sailing today, Norman A. Cross of San Diego, California who had some 1,400 boats building or sailing by the 1980s, Jay Kantola in southern California with his stylish streamlined tris, and Derek Kelsall in England, the first designer to use foam and fiberglass "sandwich" construction and win a long-distance race with his prototype the 42 foot Toria.

=== Circumnavigation in a Piver trimaran ===
In 1969, the Golden Globe solo non-stop round-the-world race was announced. Nigel Tetley was sailing a full-cabin version of the 40-foot, Piver Victress trimaran. He became the first sailor to sail a trimaran around the world by crossing his tracks in the Atlantic Ocean while competing in the Golden Globe race. In his book Trimaran Solo, Tetley admitted that he never built his Victress strong enough to survive the rigors of the race because he never intended to sail her across an ocean. As the Golden Globe race progressed Tetley's trimaran sustained greater and greater damage until the point where he decided to abandon her after a gale near the Azores on May 21, 1969.

=== Criticism ===
Piver boats could never sail well upwind. In addition some versions left much to be desired, because backyard boatbuilders lacked the necessary skills or altered the original plans. However, Piver was driven to maintain his position as the world's top designer. He responded with the AA "Advanced Amateur" range with a sleek, fast profile using fiberglass over marine plywood and using double chines to improve his boats' underwater shape. Plans for the Pi series and custom designs were available for lease only. He sailed his next boat across the Atlantic to compete with the growing fleet of multihulls that was based on the south coast of England.

== Disappearance ==
Piver's later 33' boat Stiletto was no match for the sleek molded fiberglass cats from Prout and Sailcraft and Kelsall's sandwich tris. To redeem himself, Piver announced that he would enter the next Observer Single-handed Trans-Atlantic Race (OSTAR) in 1968. Having no time left for a solo qualification passage, he left his boat in England over the winter of 1967, and returned home. To qualify for the OSTAR, he still had to complete a 500-mile solo voyage, which he elected to do from San Francisco rather than in the spring in England. Piver borrowed a 25' tri from one of his homebuilders, set out to qualify for the 1968 OSTAR, and was never seen again.

== Designs ==
=== Dinghies ===
- Scooter 10

=== Catamarans ===
- Piver V4 14, V6 16, V8 18
- Pussy Cat 12

=== Trimarans ===
- no name, just length: 27', 27.6', 40', 42' 64'
- AA 17, AA 31, AA 36, AA 41, AA 48
- Allegro 29
- Banner 20
- Bird 38
- Chariot 27
- Class B 20
- Dart 25, Dart 36
- Daysailing Trimaran 22
- Diadem 53
- Empress 64
- Encore 28
- Frolic, Frolic 2
- Gambit 17, Gambit Mark II
- Glass Trimaran: 23', 24', 26', 30',40', 41'
- Herald: 32-36'
- Lodestar 35
- Medallion 47
- Motor Sailer 42
- Nugget 24, Nugget Mark II 24
- Mariner 25
- Nimble 30
- Ocean Racing 33
- Pi 24, Pi 25, Pi 30, Pi 35, Pi 41, Pi 47, Pi 54, Pi 64, Pi 65
- Stiletto 33
- Trident 46
- Undine 52
- Victress 40

== Books ==
- Trans-Atlantic Trimaran, Pi-Craft, Mill Valley, CA, 1961; ASIN: B0007E3H2M
- Trans-Pacific Trimaran, Pi-Craft, Mill Valley, CA, 1963; ASIN: B000GWSOAU
- Navigation by Simulous, Pi-Craft, Mill Valley, CA, 1963 (Simulous = simple + ridiculous)
- Noon Position, Pi-Craft, Mill Valley, CA, 1963; ASIN: B0007F60V6
- Trimaran Third Book, Pi-Craft, Mill Valley, CA, 1965
- Modern Sailboats, Pi-Craft, Mill Valley, CA, [?]

== In popular culture ==
These books refer to journeys made on Piver designs.

- Queequeg's Odyssey, Quen Cultra.
- Barrier Reef by Trimaran, John Gunn. Collins, Sydney, 1966. (35 foot, fibreglassed plywood Lodestar trimaran)

== See also ==
- List of people who disappeared mysteriously at sea
