= Type 26 =

Type 26 may refer to:

- Peugeot Type 26, motor vehicle by the French auto-maker Peugeot
- Type 26 frigate, a future frigate of the Royal Navy
- Type 26 revolver, a revolver of the Imperial Japanese Army
- Type 26 Pillbox, a British WW II defence structure.

== See also ==
- Class 26 (disambiguation)
- T26 (disambiguation)
