= Lock Crowther =

Australian multihull sailboat designer

- Born: 9 September 1940; Brighton, Victoria, Australia
- Occupation: Ship Designer
- Children: Brett Crowther

Lock Crowther (9 September 1940–1993; first name by birth Lachlan) was an Australian multihull sailboat designer. He grew up in Bairnsdale in the East Gippsland region of Victoria. Though his first name was Lachlan by birth, he insisted on being called Lock or Lockie.

== Career ==
Lock and his family built his first boat, a trimaran called Bunyip, in 1959 while he was still a teenager. In 1960 he raced in the Easter regatta at Paynesville, Victoria, Australia, and won against a field of 300 boats. This initial success inspired others to build similar boats. Crowther then studied electrical engineering in Melbourne and in the early 1960s became involved in multihull design and the Amateur Yacht Research Society. In 1962 Trio was built based upon his designs.

Crowther's next design was the Kraken 25, garnering some recognition. Later, Lockie decided to give up his day job in Melbourne and move to Sydney to design multihulls full-time.

In 1969, a Kraken 40 won the New York to Bermuda race with him aboard. Crowther's first offshore racing trimaran, Bandersnatch, won the Sydney to Hobart multihull race in 1996.

== Legacy ==
During Crowther's career, over 2500 of his designs were built. A notable design was the trimaran Spirit of America, an early user of GRP-foam sandwich construction featuring composite beams with unidirectional fibres and turned-down ends. Crowther also developed 'bulbous bows' to reduce pitching, and thus increase speed when sailing upwind in a swell.

After Crowther's death in 1993, Crowther Designs was run by his son, Brett. Based in northern Sydney, it merged with Incat Designs - Sydney in 2005 to form Incat Crowther. Some Crowther designs are now offered through Melbourne-based Bloomfield Innovation, run by a former associate.

== Designs ==
Please note this list is incomplete.

- Bunyip 20 (1959)
- Trio (1962)
- Buccaneer 24
- Buccaneer 28
- Buccaneer 33
- Buccaneer 35
- Buccaneer 36
- Buccaneer 40
- Kraken 18
- Kraken 25
- Kraken 33
- Kraken 40
- spindrift 37
- Quickcat (1986 Auckland Ferry)

== See also ==
- Austral 20
- Trimaran Yacht Club of Victoria
