= Kraken 40 =

Australian sailboat

Development
- Designer: Lock Crowther
- Location: Australia
- Year: 1970
- Name: Kraken 40

Boat
- Draft: 1.75 ft (0.53 m)

Hull
- Type: trimaran
- Hull weight: 2,722 kg (6,001 lb)
- LOA: 39.5 ft (12.0 m)
- LWL: 34.5 ft (10.5 m)
- Beam: 27 ft (8.2 m)

Rig
- Rig type: masthead sloop

Kraken 40 is a trimaran designed by Lock Crowther in Australia and first built in 1970.

== See also ==
- List of multihulls
- Lock Crowther
- Kraken 18
- Kraken 25
- Kraken 33
