= Va'a =

Traditional outrigger canoe from Polynesia

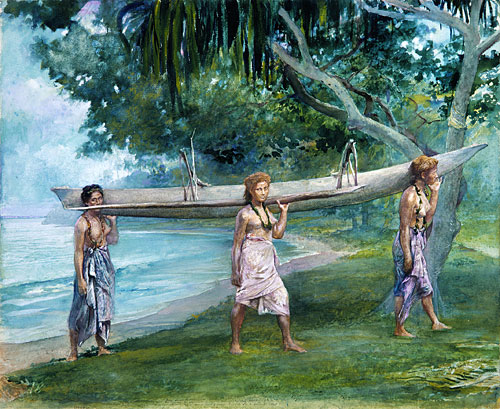
John La Farge 1891 painting of girls carrying a vaʻa at Vaiala, Samoa.

Vaʻa is a word in Samoan and Tahitian which means 'boat', 'canoe' or 'ship'. It is cognate with other Polynesian words such as vaka or the Māori word waka. It is also known as the Wa'a in Hawaiian.

The vaʻa usually takes the form a dugout canoe carved from a single tree trunk, typically used by one to three individuals for fishing activities around the island. It normally has a float or outrigger (called ama in various Polynesian languages), which is attached to the main hull for stability.

The word vaʻa contrasts with larger traditional seagoing vessels for long-distance voyages, whose names include vaʻa tele ('big ship'), alia, or tepukei.

A modern version of the smaller vaʻa is used in the sport of outrigger canoe racing. Due to the extra stability created by the outrigger system, a modified version of the va'a canoe was included as a new Paralympic Games event from 2020.

== History ==
Some sources claim that vaʻa have existed for more than 4,000 years, i.e. well before the birth of the Polynesian world. This actually refers to the innovation of the outrigger canoe, which can be traced back to early Austronesian navigators.

== Sport ==
International Va'a Federation, the International governing body for the sport of Outrigger Canoe/Va'a since 1984.

== Types of vaʻa ==
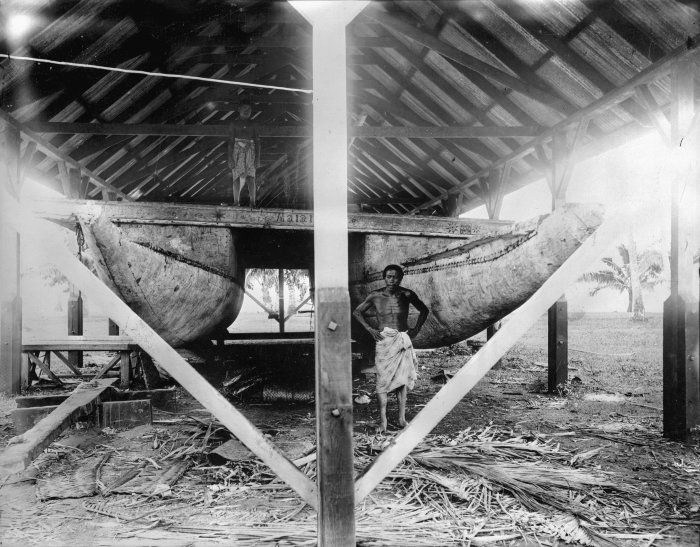
Doubled hulled Vaʻa tele (large Vaʻa) or ʻalia, Samoa, circa 1910

=== Samoa ===
The Samoans have four kinds of canoes, smaller fishing vessels or the larger oceangoing va'a-tele or ʻalia, which are mostly out of use today;

- paopao A single outrigger canoe made from a single log;
- vaʻa-alo A small fishing-canoe.
- Large single canoes, termed respectively la'au lima (five-barred), or six or seven-barred, as the case might be, were canoes varying in length from thirty, fifty, sixty, and even seventy feet, as required. They were balanced by an outrigger firmly lashed to the canoe on the left side at a distance of three feet if meant for pulling, but of five or six feet if required for sailing. The single canoes have a light appearance, the prow and stern being slightly curved upwards, so that merely the bosom or central part of an unloaded canoe rests upon the water.
- ʻalia. Samoan double canoe, va'a-tele (the big canoe), was much larger, and consisted of two canoes, one longer than the other, lashed together with cross-bars amidships, and having the thatched shed or cabin built upon a stage that projected over the stern, instead of in midships, as in the Tonga canoes. It was much larger than this canoe, but more difficult to manage, yet able to carry one or two Vaʻa-alo, or small fishing-canoes, on deck as required.

== Construction ==
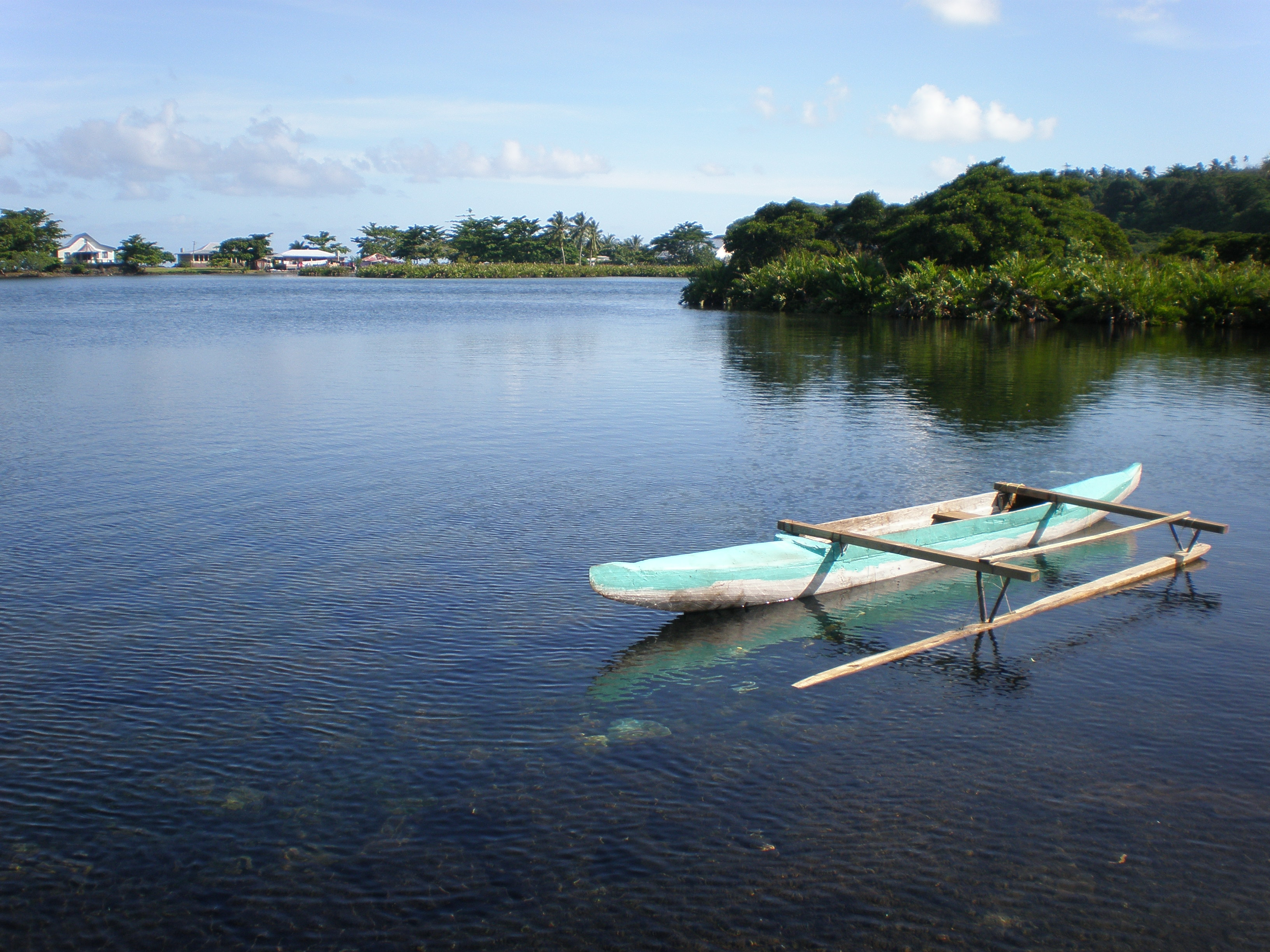
Typical Vaʻa with outrigger for fishing, Savai'i Island, Samoa.

A main hull of a vaʻa can be made in one piece, from a hollowed out trunk of a large tree with the ama float attached later. Other types of Polynesian construction include 'sewing' planks of wood together with special cords and ropes, a type of hand made sennit, important in the material cultures of the people of Oceania.

== Other meanings ==
Vaʻa is also a surname in the Samoa Islands, and may refer to:

- Earl Va'a (b. 1976), Samoan rugby player
- Justin Va'a (b. 1978), Samoan rugby player

== See also ==
- Culture of Samoa
- Polynesian navigation
- Hokulea
- Lakana
- Wa'a
- Outrigger boat
- Regatta
