= Crowther Buccaneer 28 =

Buccaneer 28
Development
- Designer: Lock Crowther
- Location: Australia
- Year: 1973
- Name: Buccaneer 28

Boat
- Draft: 2 ft 6 in (0.76 m)

Hull
- Type: Open trimaran
- Construction: 3/16" sheet plywood
- Hull weight: 2,000 lb (910 kg)
- LOA: 28 ft 3 in (8.61 m)
- LWL: 26 ft 9 in (8.15 m)
- Beam: 21 ft 6 in (6.55 m)

Hull appendages
- Keel: centreboard

Rig
- Rig type: Fractional Bermuda or Marconi rig

Sails
- Total sail area: 610 sq ft (57 m^{2})

Buccaneer 28 was a trailerable trimaran sailboat designed by Lock Crowther. It featured an auxiliary 9HP outboard motor.

== See also ==
- List of multihulls
