= Jay Kantola =

Jay Kantola was an American naval architect who is most known for his work designing multihull sailboats. He began designing multihulls in the 1960s. Kantola was an early proponent of a vessel construction technique called cold molding and cored construction. Cold molding involves bending strips of wood at room temperature to form a desired shape. The shape is then retained by gluing the wood together using epoxy. When the shaped construction is coated with layers of fiberglass saturated with epoxy, the final construct is termed a cored or composite construction. Kantola was one of several designers that worked closely with Meade Gougeon, Joel Gougeon, and Jan Gougeon. These brothers are collectively known as the Gougeon brothers. They also designed vessels and founded a line of epoxy products called West System.

Kantola primarily produced the plans and blueprints for others to construct the final product. One builder he worked closely with for many years was Richard Barrie in Western Boatworks of Reseda, California. Perhaps the most famous vessel that resulted in this collaboration was the 1/8th scale model of the stern section of the vessel RMS Titanic. The 60-foot-long (18 m) stern section was utilized in the sinking scenes shot for the movie Titanic. A second model of the entire vessel at a scale of 1/20th of its actual size now resides in a museum. To construct both models, Kantola utilized drawings of the Titanic's sister ship, the RMS Olympic.

Kantola also designed the personal sailing vessels built by Ricard Barrie and his wife, Kris Barrie, for their own use. The Barrie family weathered a storm aboard the Kantola designed trimaran named Fifth Fox in May 1984 that had winds over 50 knots. In the 1990s, they built a much larger trimaran named Windswept. Windswept is believed to have been the largest trimaran designed by Kantola. It took the Barrie couple eight years to build the 65-foot (19.8-meter) long by 40-foot (12.2-meter) wide vessel. It was ultimately launched in 2000. The vessel featured four cabins, two heads, a large living area, and a 79-foot-tall mast. It could sail at speeds in the low 20-knot range.

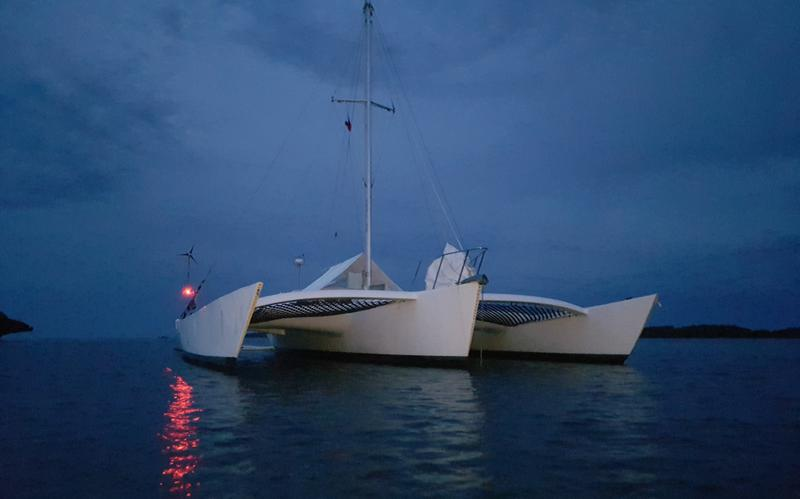
65-foot trimaran sailing vessel designed by Kantola. She launched as Windswept, and at the time of this photograph, she was known as Hot Buoys. It is still sailing as of 2022 in Langkawi, Malaysia and is now known as Erika.

For sheer poetry and performance, Jay Kantola's tris are a class apart. Spaceity, a 32-foot sloop encountered in Pago Pago, presented a symphony of lines, from matched transoms to triple bows. Flat-bottom planing floats give her 180-mile days. A large centerboard provided sportscar handling, but severely restricted her main cabin.

— Randy Thomas, Yachting (1985)

== Other vessels designed by Kantola ==
- Name, trimaran, launched 1979, 34 ft long
- StarTide, trimaran, launched in the late 1980s, length approximately 38 ft
- Name?, trimaran, launched 1981, 35 ft
- Mike Carlson's trimaran, launched?, 39 ft
- Haiku, trimaran, launched 1985, 44 ft long and 26.5 ft wide
