= T26 =

T26 may refer to:

== Rail and transit ==
- GER Class T26, a steam tender locomotive
- Ritsurin-Kōen-Kitaguchi Station, in Takamatsu, Kagawa, Japan
- Shitennōji-mae Yūhigaoka Station, in Tennoji-ku, Osaka, Japan

== Ships and boats ==
- T26 (trimaran), a sailboat
- German torpedo boat T26
- Type 26 frigate, of the Royal Navy

== Weapons and armor ==
- T-26, a Soviet tank
- T-26 Garand, an American prototype rifle
- T26 Pershing, an American prototype tank

== Other uses ==
- Junkers T 26, a German prototype trainer aircraft
- T26 road (Tanzania)
- Slingsby T.26 Kite 2, a British glider
- Talbot Lago Record, an executive car
