= T26 (trimaran) =

Development
- Designer: Victor Tchetchet
- Year: Very late 1940s or early 1950
- Name: T26

Hull
- Type: Open trimaran
- LOA: 26 ft (7.9 m)

T26 was a trimaran sailboat designed by Victor Tchetchet in the very late 1940s or early in 1950. It was the predecessor to his later craft Egg Nog.

T26 was entered into the 1950 One of a Kind Series and placed 21st.

The vessel could reach faster than all other boats on days with moderate to heavy wind, attaining speeds of up to 15 knots (equivalent to 27.78 km (17.26 miles) per hour), but could not go to weather even as well as monohull vessels. The design was enhanced for Tchetchet's subsequent vessel Egg Nog.

== See also ==
- List of multihulls
- Egg Nog
- Egg Nog II
- Victor Tchetchet
