= Ed Horstman =

Ed Horstman is an American naval architect and multihull sailboat designer based in the West Coast of the United States.

== Early life ==
Horstman was born in Kalispell, Montana. He made his way from Montana to California via the U.S. Air Force where he was trained as a helicopter mechanic before serving 4 years in Korea. After the war on the GI Bill Ed attended the Northrop Institute of Technology where he earned a bachelor of science degree in Aeronautical Engineering.

== Career ==
Horstman worked for aviation giants like Boeing, Douglas Aircraft (on the A4 program), and North American Aircraft where he did wind tunnel tests for the XB-70 supersonic bomber.

He designed his first trimaran after seeing an ad clipping for Arthur Piver trimarans. He wrote to Piver requesting information on his 35-foot trimaran, but never received an answer. A friend, said, "You're an engineer, why don't you design one."

Before starting, Ed took two courses on hydrodynamics from the University of Southern California before building a scale model out of foam with removable amas to determine the maximum beam and buoyancy. The model did not have a movable rudder and, when a gust of wind hit the model hard and it turned into the wind, he knew he got the design right. When he could not find a mathematical model to predict the stress on the beams, Horstman again built models of the beams and put them through a battery of stress tests until he was satisfied that his scantlings were strong enough.

He constructed his first trimaran, a 40-footer with $600 that he borrowed from his grandmother in 1961. Although influenced by Piver's designs, Horstman diverged by using Boeing technology to make flush-decked sailboat ""with accommodation in all three hulls—the dreadnaught class of trimarans"
