= Amaryllis (catamaran) =

Amaryllis was a catamaran sailboat designed by Nathanael Greene Herreshoff and launched in 1876. It was an innovative and experimental vessel for its time, featuring two parallel hulls connected by a platform or bridge deck. Herreshoff designed Amaryllis to test the performance and potential advantages of multihull designs.

In 1876, Amaryllis participated in the New York Centennial Regatta, a prestigious sailing competition held to celebrate the 100th anniversary of the United States. She surprised many by performing exceptionally well, even outpacing some of the traditional monohull sailboats. Amaryllis achieved a significant victory in the regatta, showcasing the potential of multihulls in terms of speed and efficiency. However, the success of Amaryllis in the New York Centennial Regatta resulted in a controversial decision. Following the regatta, the organizers of organized sailing competitions, such as the America's Cup, decided to ban multihull sailing vessels from future events. This ban lasted for many years and prevented catamarans and other multihulls from participating in major racing events.

Ironically, Herreshoff was later to become a celebrated monohull designer.

Amaryllis was succeeded by a second catamaran vessel, Tarantella.

It is said that prejudice against multihulls resulting from Amarayllis' superior performance was only overcome by Victor Tchetchet much later in 1946.

== See also ==
- List of multihulls
- Victor Tchetchet
