= Class 26 =

Class 26 may refer to:

- British Rail Class 26, diesel-electric locomotive
- Variant of the Caledonian Railway 782 Class steam locomotive with condensing equipment
- GER Class T26, British 2-4-0 steam tender locomotive
- KTM Class 26, Malaysian diesel-electric freight locomotive
- L&YR Class 26, British 2-6-2T steam locomotive
- SAR Class 26, South African 4-8-4 steam locomotive designed by David Wardale
- New South Wales Z26 class locomotive, Australian 2-6-2T steam locomotive
- SNCB Class 26, Belgian electric locomotive

== See also ==
- Type 26 (disambiguation)
