= Egg Nog (trimaran) =

Egg Nog / Egg Nog I
Development
- Designer: Victor Tchetchet
- Year: Early 1950s
- Name: Egg Nog / Egg Nog I

Boat
- Draft: 1 ft 2 in (0.36 m)

Hull
- Type: Open trimaran
- Hull weight: 500 lb (230 kg)
- LWL: 20 ft 6 in (6.25 m)
- Beam: 13 ft (4.0 m) (overall); 12 ft 6 in (3.81 m) (waterline)

Sails
- Total sail area: 230 sq ft (21 m^{2})

Egg Nog (sometimes Egg Nog I) was a trimaran sailboat designed and built by Victor Tchetchet in New York City in the early 1950s, after his late 1940s vessel T26 and before Egg Nog II.

Egg Nog was faster in lighter airs than its predecessor, T26, and was considered the best (fastest) multihull during summer competitions on the US east coast in 1955.

Together, Tchetchet's vessels were notable for helping to reintroduce multihull sailboats to the western world.

== See also ==
- List of multihulls
