= Atlantic 50 =

The Atlantic 50 (or Atlantic Cat 50) was the flagship design in the Atlantic Cat series of catamaran sailboats by Chris White, which pioneered the forward cockpit concept for catamarans. The model was first launched in 1983.

== See also ==
- List of multihulls
- Chris White
