= Tarantella (catamaran) =

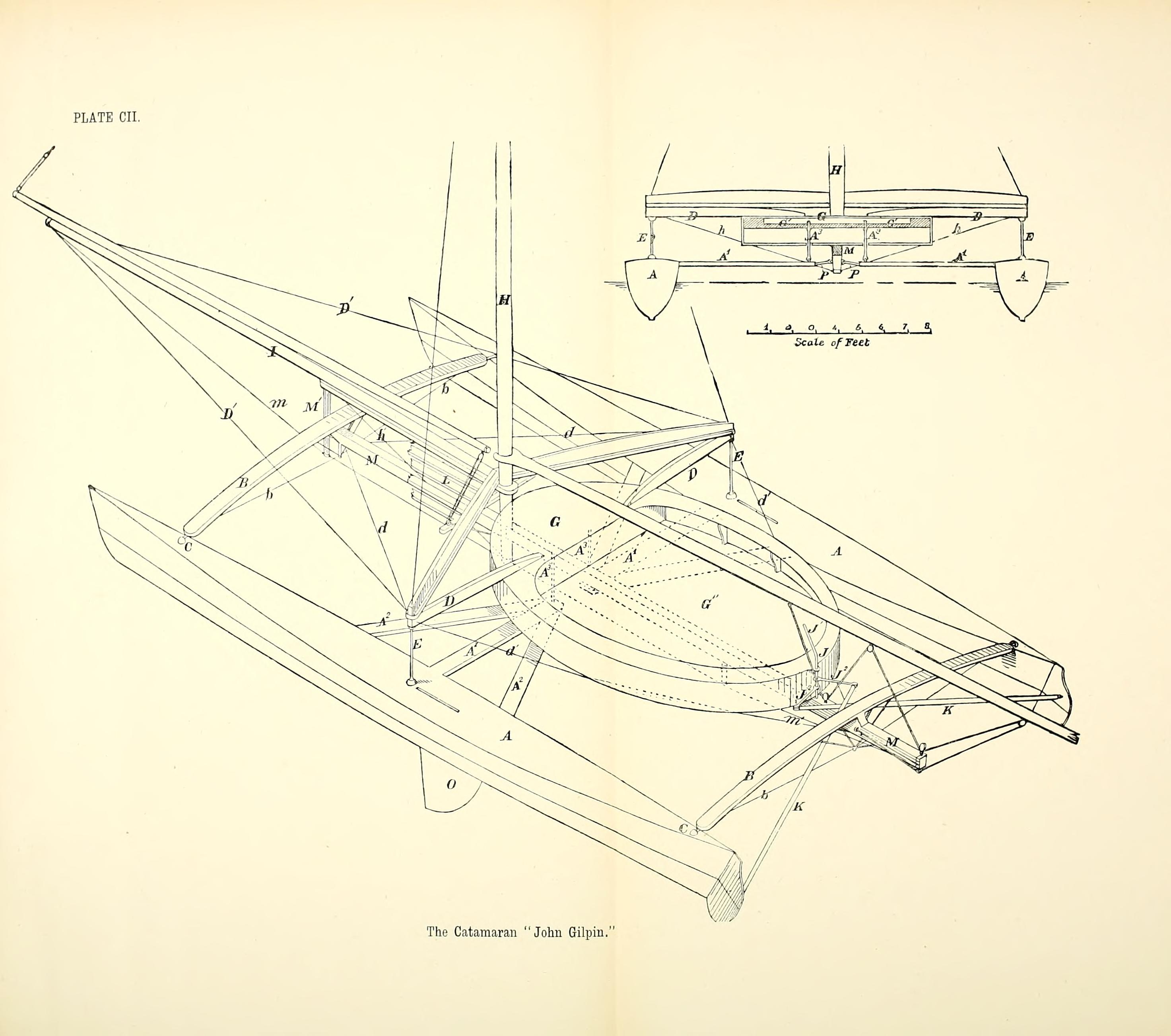
the patent drawing for one of Tarantella's 32ft sisterships

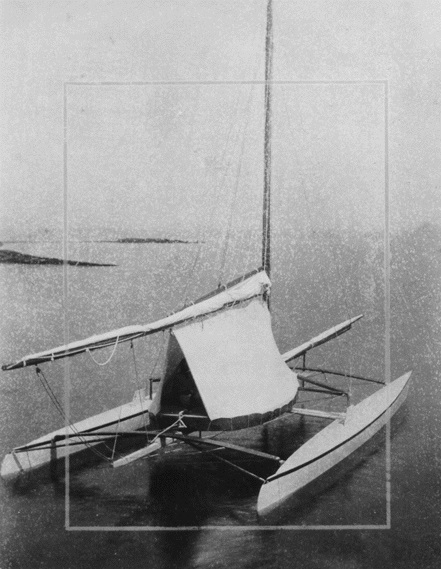
Tarantella

Tarantella was a 33 ft (10 m) sailing catamaran designed by Nathanael Greene Herreshoff. She was launched in 1877, a year after Herreshoff's smaller catamaran Amaryllis won the 1876 New York Centennial Regatta, which resulted in multihulls being banned from regattas. The Tarantella was 15 inches (38 cm) longer than her two patented sisterships Teaser and John Gilpin (measuring approximately 32 feet in length overall). She was eventually exported to the United Kingdom. The brother of her designer described these catamarans as outstanding upwind performers:

I can, with a good whole-sail breeze, beat to windward faster, by a mile an hour at least, than any other sailing vessel afloat.

— Lewis Herreshoff, The Spirit of the Times (November 24th, 1877)

== See also ==
- List of multihulls
- Catamaran
- Nathanael Greene Herreshoff
