= Paopao (canoe) =

Single-outrigger boat from Tuvalu

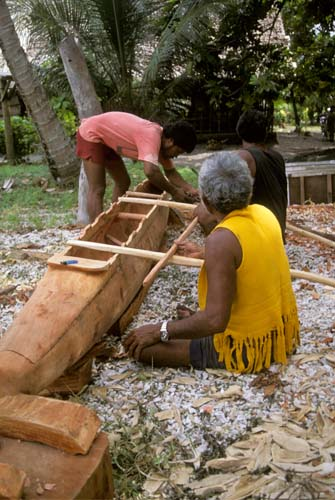
Men carve a canoe on Nanumea Atoll in Tuvalu.

A paopao (from the Samoan language, meaning a small fishing canoe made from a single log), is the name used by the Polynesian-speaking inhabitants of the Ellice Islands (now Tuvalu) for their single-outrigger canoes, of which the largest could carry four to six adults. The large double-hulled sailing canoes (lualua and foulua) had ceased to be constructed in the Ellice Islands some time before contact with Europeans.

Donald Gilbert Kennedy, the resident District Officer in the administration of the Gilbert and Ellice Islands Colony from 1932 to 1938, described the construction of paopao and of the variations of single-outrigger canoes that had been developed on Vaitupu and Nanumea. Gerd Koch, an anthropologist, visited the atolls of Nanumaga, Nukufetau and Niutao, in 1960–61, and published a book on the material culture of the Ellice Islands, which also described the canoes of those islands.

The variations of single-outrigger canoes that had been developed on Vaitupu and Nanumea were reef-type or paddled canoes; that is, they were designed for carrying over the reef and being paddled, rather than being sailed. Outrigger canoes from Nui were constructed with an indirect type of outrigger attachment and the hull is double-ended, with no distinct bow and stern. These canoes were designed to be sailed over the Nui lagoon. The booms of the outrigger are longer than those found in other designs of canoes from the Ellice Islands. This made the Nui canoe more stable when used with a sail than the other designs.

== The skilled woodworker (tufunga) ==
The people of Nanumea are renowned in Tuvalu as canoe master craftsmen. A 1996 survey conducted on Nanumea found some 80 canoes. In 2020 there are about 50 canoes with up to five households practicing traditional canoe building. However, the availability of mature fetau trees (Calophyllum inophyllum) on the island is declining.

An outrigger canoe would be constructed by a skilled woodworker (tofuga or tufunga) of the family, on whose land was a suitable tree. The canoe builder would call on the assistance of the tufunga of other families. The ideal shape the canoe was that of the body of a whale (tafola), while some tufunga shaped the canoe to reflect the body of a bonito (atu). Before steel tools became available, the tufunga used shell and stone adzes, which were rapidly blunted when used. With a group of up to ten tufunga building a canoe, one or two would work on the canoe, while others were engaged in sharpening the edge of one adze after another. Each morning, the tufunga would conduct a religious ceremony (lotu-a-toki) over the adzes before the commencement of work. When steel tools became available, two tufunga would be sufficient to build a canoe.

== Variations in the design of the single outrigger canoe ==
There were differences between the designs used on each island for outrigger canoes that were built in the 19th and 20th centuries. Kennedy described the canoes of Vaitupu as being of 3 types:

- The Vaitupu type – described as the traditional design of the southern islands of the Ellice Islands, which had lengths of 19 feet (5.8 m) to 29 feet (8.8 m);
- The Nanumea type – described as the traditional design of Nanumea, one of the northern islands, which had lengths of 13 feet (4.0 m) to 29 feet (8.8 m);
- The general paopao, referring to a small canoe of any type, which had lengths of 14 feet (4.3 m) to 17 feet (5.2 m).

The main differences between the Vaitupu type and the Nanumea type are in the superstructure – the bow cover (puke mua) and stern cover (puke tua) – that were added to the dug-out canoe. For example, the stern cover of the Nanumea type did not have a tokoulu, or built-up rest for carrying the bonito fishing rod at a trolling angle while hunting for a shoal of bonito. The Nanumea type had in place of the tokoulu, a cross-piece (lango kofe) set immediately in front of the inner edge of the stern cover. The bonito fishing-rod was placed in a groove in the centre of the crosspiece.

The traditional Nanumea type also had a different design for the lifting grip (saunga) and the platform on the booms (kaufuatanga) on the port (ama or outrigger side) of the canoe. The design of the traditional Nanumea type made it impossible for the paddlers occupying the seats on the after and central booms to use their paddles on the outrigger side, which meant they were more liable to fatigue when paddling long distances only on the starboard (katea) side.

== Construction materials ==
On Vaitupu, the wood used was from the broadleaf forest of the Tuvaluan atolls. A log of te fetau, (Calophyllum inophyllum) or te puka (Hernandia peltata) was dug out to form the canoe. The boom (kiato), and the boom leg (tapuvae) that braced the booms, which were attached to the float for the outrigger, were made from a branch of pua (Guettarda speciosa) or tausunu (Heliotropium foertherianum). The outrigger-float (ama) was usually made of te puka.

The float had a diameter of 5 inches (130 mm) to 9 inches (230 mm), depending on the size of the canoe. The float usually had a length in relation to the canoe such that the forward end of the float was laterally opposite the feet of the bow-paddler (tino i mua), and the after end opposite those of the steersman (tautai) in the stern of the canoe.

The hull of the canoe, the booms, boom legs, and the float were attached together using the strong three-plait sennit (tuli kafa). The less durable two-ply twist sennit (kolokolo) was only used for unimportant parts of the construction.

Two distinct types of paddle were used: the common type of paddle; and a large type used by steersmen. The woods used for paddles were pua, te puka, tausunu, fetau (Calophyllum inophyllum), milo or miro (Thespesia populnea), kanava (Cordia subcordata) and fau or fo fafini, or woman's fibre tree (Hibiscus tiliaceus).

All bailers had a shovel shape. Kennedy noted that the same phrase—o ta te liu—applies “to bail out” a canoe and “to hollow out the interior”, when building a canoe.

A canoe, when on a fishing expedition, carried a club (te siki). This is usually a branch of any heavy wood roughly trimmed and 8 feet (2.4 m) in length, and about 2 inches (51 mm) in diameter, which was used to kill a large fish before it is hauled into the canoe.

Canoes made from te puka are expected to last for more than ten years if the hull is protected by paint and the canoe is kept out of the sun when not in use. Canoes made from te fetau last much longer.

In 2021, Tuvaluan boat builders constructed paddling canoes made using modern materials (plywood, epoxy glues and resins), which are lighter than traditional canoes as well as lasting longer. As suitable trees are in short supply, the use of modern materials helps preserve the native forests.

== Fishing and inter-island voyaging by canoe ==
During the day canoes would be taken out to the bonito grounds or for deep-line fishing for yellowfin tuna (Thunnus albacares) (takua), and at night, torch-fishing for flying fish or fishing for palu (ruvettus pretiosus).

Each canoe would be given a proper name and was an important asset of the family. The larger canoes could be used to travel between the Ellice Islands. The discovery of Niulakita is claimed by travellers from Nui, led by Kaunatu who was taking people home to Vaitupu; however, their canoe drifted off course to the south and they arrived at Niulakita before returning home.
