= Polynesian multihull terminology =

Multihull terms originating in the South Pacific

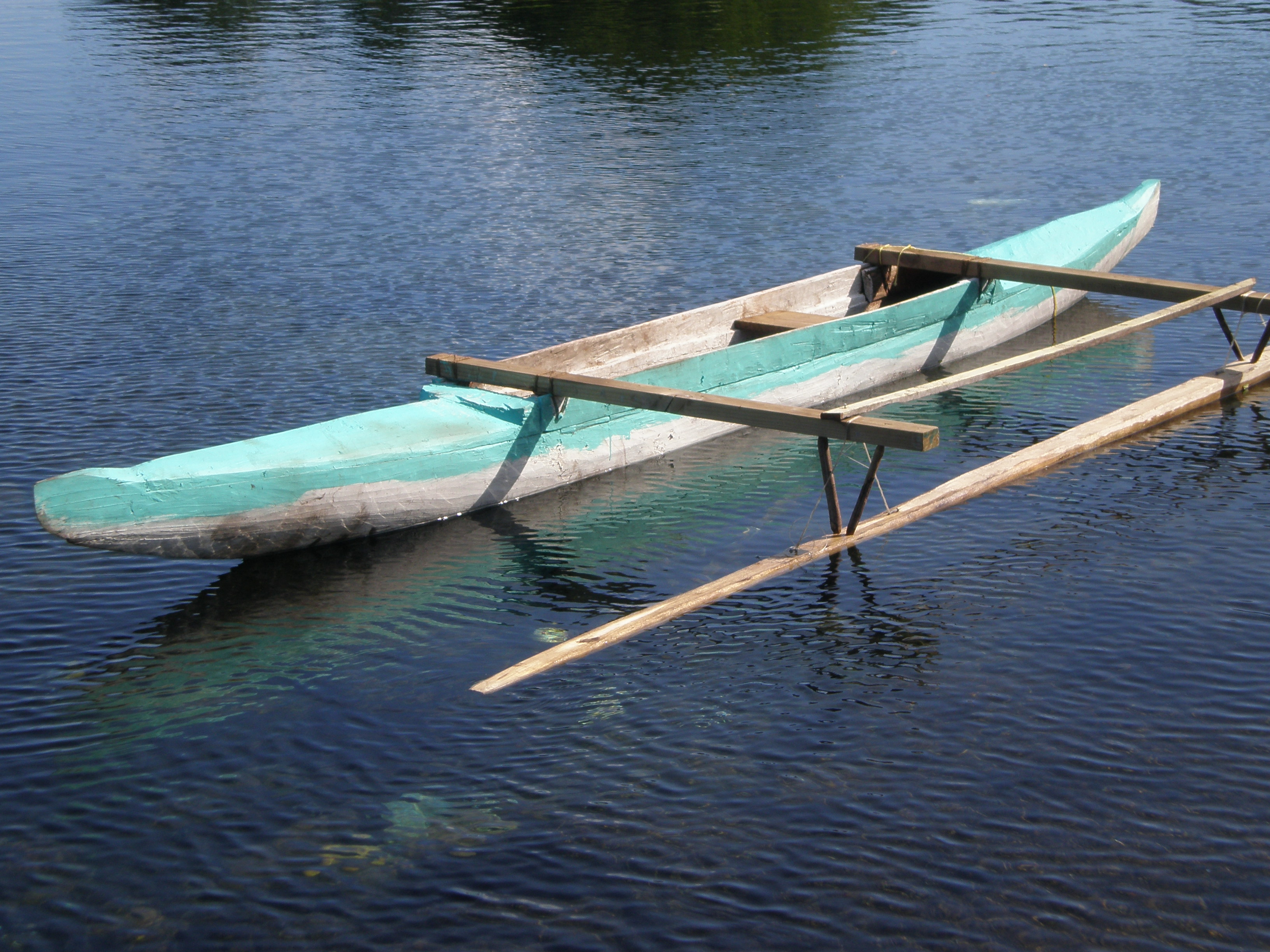
A typical fishing canoe (va'a) of Samoa, showing a simple ama for balance

Polynesian multihull terminology, such as "ama", "aka" and "vaka" (or "waka"), are multihull terms that have been widely adopted beyond the South Pacific, where these terms originated. This Polynesian terminology is in common use in the Americas and the Pacific but is almost unknown in Europe, where the English terms "hull" and "outrigger" form normal parlance. Outriggers, catamarans, and outrigger boats are a common heritage of all Austronesian peoples and predate the Micronesian and Polynesian expansion into the Pacific. They are also the dominant forms of traditional ships in Island Southeast Asian and Malagasy Austronesian cultures, where local terms are used.

== Etymology ==
The term vaka or waka means "boat" or "canoe" in most Polynesian languages. It comes from Proto-Austronesian *abaŋ, meaning "ship" or "canoe". Cognates in other Austronesian languages include Ivatan Awang, Tagalog and Visayan bangka, Malay wangkang, and Fijian waqa.

== "Ama", "aka" and "vaka" ==
The term ama is a word in the Polynesian and Micronesian languages to describe the outrigger part of a canoe to provide stability. Today, among the various Polynesian countries, the word ama is often used together with the word vaka (Cook Islands) or waka (Māori) or va'a (Samoa Islands, Tahiti), cognate words in various Polynesian languages to describe a canoe.

The Polynesian term vaka is the main hull, the ama is the outrigger, and the aka or iako (Hawaiian) is the support connecting the two (not three) hulls. The term ama and aka have been widely applied to modern trimarans.

In modern sailing, the term is sometimes used to refer to the outrigger on double-outrigger canoes (trimarans), or the two sections of a catamaran. However, calling the two sections of a catamaran by the word ama is not technically correct since they are of equal size. A catamaran is technically a wa'a wa'a or double canoe connected by an aka.

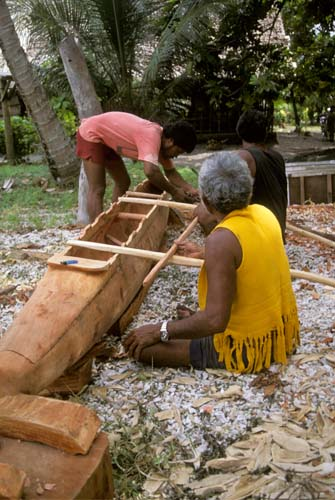
Men carve a paopao (canoe) on Nanumea Atoll in Tuvalu.

== Function ==
On a proa, the ama may provide lift or ballast, depending on whether it is designed to be used to leeward or windward; on a trimaran it is designed primarily to provide lift. There are many shapes of ama; those used in proas are generally laterally symmetric, as the proa is designed to sail with either end forwards, while trimaran ama are one-directional and may have no axis of symmetry.

The most advanced ama are composed of highly curved surfaces that generate lift when driven forward through the water, much like an airplane wing. This lift may be directed to the windward, used to counter slipping to leeward, or may be oriented vertically to counter heeling forces from the sailing rig. These highly curved structures are much more difficult to manufacture than traditional ama and are therefore more expensive. The Bruce foil is an example of a type of leeboard often attached to an ama to assist in producing lift.

== Use of the term in other cultures ==
Even though double-outrigger ships (trimarans, sometimes informally referred to as "proas" historically) of other related Austronesian groups in Island Southeast Asia, Island Melanesia, and Madagascar did not reach Polynesia or Micronesia, they may also sometimes use Polynesian terminology in modern times, especially when used in sport sailing.

The US Navy tri-hull Independence-class littoral combat ship refers to their outboard hull sections as an "Amah". "An Amah tip is the leading edge of the all-aluminum, trimaran-type vessel’s outrigger, or amah, and is more than seven feet across and weighs 850 pounds."

== See also ==
- Polynesian navigation
- Bangka (boat)
- Hōkūleʻa
