= Trimaran Yacht Club of Victoria =

Former Australian yacht club

The Trimaran Yacht Club of Victoria was a club in Victoria, Australia, for persons interested in trimaran sailboats.

== Newsletters ==
The club published the T.Y.C.V Newsletter every two months. The first newsletter was published on 31 March 1970 with a list price of 5c. The final newsletter was published on 11 August 1977 wish a list price of 5c.

== Fate ==
In 1977, the club became the Multihull Yacht Club of Victoria.

In the final edition of the newsletter, the commodore David Drew wrote of this decision:

We have all seen the development of both these craft run in paralell [sic] lines so it is only right that we should incorporate both craft together. The type of experience that can be passed on to members has been gained in well over a decade and it is hoped that the multihull enthusiasts will except [sic] this experience so that they too can add to our seamanship. Our craft are unique and strange to the commons sailor and I feel that the years and show that it is in all our interests to change the outlook that appears to have grown over the years and show that our craft are as safe and capable as any craft that may sail the seas.

— David Drew, Commadore [sic] of the Trimaran Yacht Club of Victoria
