= Chris White (multihull designer) =

American multihull sailboat designer

Chris White is an American multihull sailboat designer.

== Career ==
White built his first trimaran, a Jim Brown designed Searunner 31, in 1973. In the late 1970s he worked with Jim Brown and Dick Newick. His first large design was the 52' trimaran, Juniper, built in southern Virginia and launched in 1981, later sailed around the world by Henk de Velde. In 1983 he started his design business, developing the concept of the forward cockpit or pilot house catamaran. The first of the Atlantic Cats were launched in 1985.

=== Designs ===
- 1981
  - Juniper
- Later 1980s
  - Discovery 20
  - Atlantic 50
- Atlantic Cats
  - Atlantic 48
  - Atlantic 55
  - Atlantic 57
- 2010s
  - Atlantic 47

=== Books ===
In 1990 Chris published The Cruising Multihull, which is still in print.

== See also ==
- Henk de Velde
