= Bunyip 20 =

Racing sailboat

Bunyip / Bunyip 20
Development
- Designer: Lock Crowther
- Location: Australia
- Year: 1959
- Role: day racer
- Name: Bunyip / Bunyip 20

Boat
- Crew: 1-2

Hull
- Type: Open trimaran
- Construction: 3/16" sheet plywood on wooden frames and stringers, wooden mast
- LOA: 20 ft (6.1 m)
- Beam: 11 ft (3.4 m)

Hull appendages
- Keel: centreboard

Rig
- Rig type: Fractional Bermuda or Marconi sloop rig

Sails
- Upwind sail area: 227 sq ft (21.1 m^{2}) (sloop rig - racing); 167 sq ft (15.5 m^{2}) (small headsail)
- Total sail area: 227 sq ft (21.1 m^{2})

Bunyip 20 was a day racing trimaran sailboat designed and built by Lock Crowther and his family in 1959, while he was still a teenager. It was named after the Bunyip, an Australian mythical creature.

In 1960 Crowther raced the first boat at the Easter regatta at Paynesville, Victoria, Australia, and won against a field of 300 boats. This initial success inspired others to build similar boats, and began his career.

I knew that Lockie and his family were keen on sailing and that they had built a trimaran. As the sailing speedboat I saw that afternoon was a trimaran, I guessed, correctly, that it belonged to Lockie's family. It was not long before I'd wangled an invitation to go sailing. Their trimaran, 6 metres long, had been designed by Lockie and built out of plywood on wooden frames and stringers by him, his two brothers and their father. Maybe his sister and mother had a hand in it too; they were a close family. The tri was sloop-rigged with a wooden mast. The balanced jib was attached to a boom. The decks between the main hull and the floats were plywood. In an effort to provide lift, the floats were flat-bottomed. Although this feature was not an absolute failure, more often than not it just created extra drag. The trimaran was named Bunyip, after an Australian mythical creature. Another feature, intended to prevent broaching, was the very full bow on the main hull. This was the reason for the twin jets of water that came off the forefoot, ensuring that at any speed at all the crew became absolutely saturated. On my first outing, we were three-up; I was just a passsenger [sic]. As the wind was fairly light, the Crowthers had rigged a single-luffed spinnaker as a genoa. One of the brothers was out on a trapeze and Lockie was steering. I just sat there, thrilled by the water hosing off the bow into my face, by the rush of wind and by the streaming wake. I was hooked, but I was still a student, with no spare money at all. Building a trimaran myself was out of the question, at least for the time being.

— Howard Stephenson

== See also ==
- List of multihulls
- Lock Crowther
