= Norman Cross (multihull designer) =

Norman Cross (c. 1915 – August 14, 1990) was a Canadian multihull sailboat designer.

== Career ==
A design engineer by profession, Cross worked for Ford Motor Company, then spent 16 years with General Dynamics' Convair Division in their department of wind-tunnel model design and towing basin testing. He spent much of his life in San Diego, California, beginning to design multihulls in the 1950s, starting with catamarans. His full-time multihull development work began in 1968.

== Designs ==
Cross was responsible for at least the following designs:

- Cross 10.5
- Cross 18
- Cross 24 (1963) and later Cross 24 MkII
- Cross 26 (1960s or before) and later Cross 26 MkII
- Cross 27 ("stretched Cross 26 MkII")
- Cross 28
- Cross 30
- Cross 31 and later Cross 31 MkII
- Cross 32R
- Cross 34 and later Cross 34 MkII
- Cross 34R ("stretched Cross 32R")
- Cross 35
- Cross 36
- Cross 36R
- Cross 37
- Cross 38 (1985)
- Cross 39
- Cross 39R ("stretched Cross 36R")
- Cross 39RC
- Cross 40RC
- Cross 40
- Cross 40R
- Cross 42 and later Cross 42 MkII
- Cross 44 ("stretched Cross42 MkII")
- Cross 45R
- Cross 46 and later Cross 46 MkII
- Cross 48 Model-B
- Cross 49
- Cross 50
- Cross 52
- Cross 52R
- Cross 78R (late 1980s)
