= Victor Tchetchet =

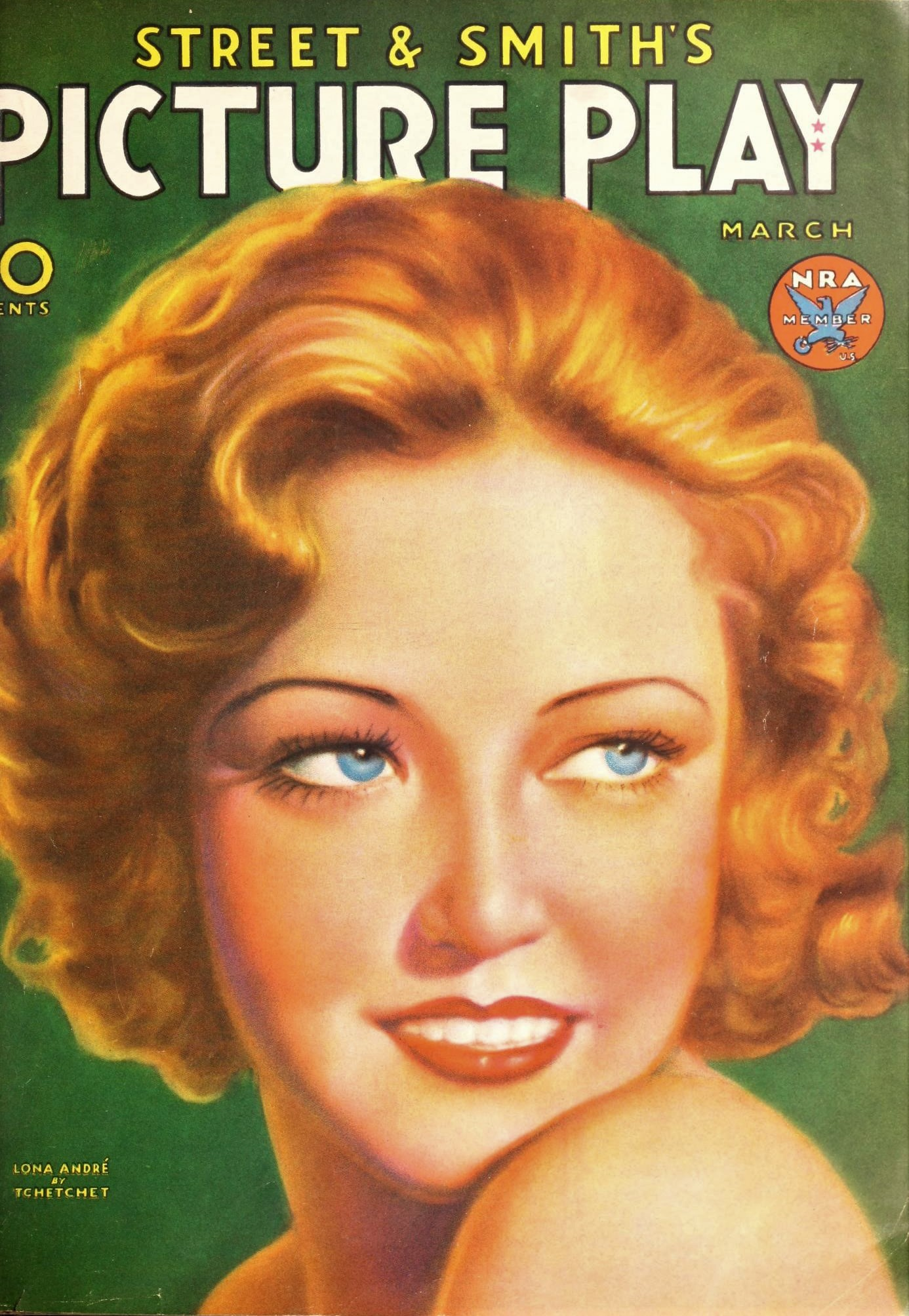
Lona Andre, painted by Victor Tchetchet (1934)

Victor Tchetchet (June 19, 1891 – April 26, 1974) was a pioneering early modern multihull sailboat designer from Ukraine (at his birth part of the Russian Empire) who is thought to have coined the term 'trimaran', though Éric de Bisschop built a trimaran in France earlier. He was also a landscape and portrait painter.

Born in Kyiv, Victor was inspired by South Pacific outriggers to connect two 18 ft (5.5 m) canoes to make a catamaran and enter the Kyiv Imperial Yacht Club's local races. After winning, he was disqualified.

In 1923 Tchetchet emigrated to New York City and further experimented with catamarans and trimarans. In 1945 he launched his first trimaran, of 24 ft (7.3 m) length.

Tchetchet entered the Marblehead Race Week in 1946. Despite a poor performance, his participation helped to overcome the local prejudice against multihulls after Nathanael Herreshoff's 1876 win with the catamaran Amaryllis at the New York Yacht Club's Centennial Regatta. In the same year, he established the International Multihull Boat Racing Association.

== Designs ==
Victor Tchetchet's boat designs include the following:

- T26 (trimaran) - 26 ft (7.9 m) (circa 1949)
- Egg Nog (trimaran) - 24 ft (7.3 m) (circa 1955)
- Egg Nog II (trimaran)

== See also ==
- Trimaran
