= Austral 20 (catamaran) =

Development
- Designer: Charles Cunningham
- Location: Australia
- Year: 1960s
- Name: Austral 20

Hull
- Type: Catamaran
- Construction: Fiberglass
- LOA: 6 m (20 ft)

Austral 20 was a 6 m (20 ft) catamaran produced by Charles Cunningham in Australia in the early 1960s period of experimentation.

It was apparently produced in reasonable numbers by Charles himself.

By now I was earning a proper wage and I wanted to build my own trimaran. For someone who had never made anything more difficult than a doorstop, this was a major decision. I reckoned that I could rely on Lockie and other yachtie friends to advise me on boatbuilding, and save a lot of time by purchasing a ready-made main hull. But who made stock trimaran hulls? No-one, of course; but Charles Cunningham was turning out fibreglass shells for his 6-metre Austral 20 catamaran. I bought one of these, decked it with plywood, built timber-and-ply crossbeams and floats to Lockie's design and fabricated much of the hardware from stainless-steel plate.

— Howard Stephenson

== See also ==
- List of multihulls
- Lock Crowther
