= Trimaran =

Multihull boat

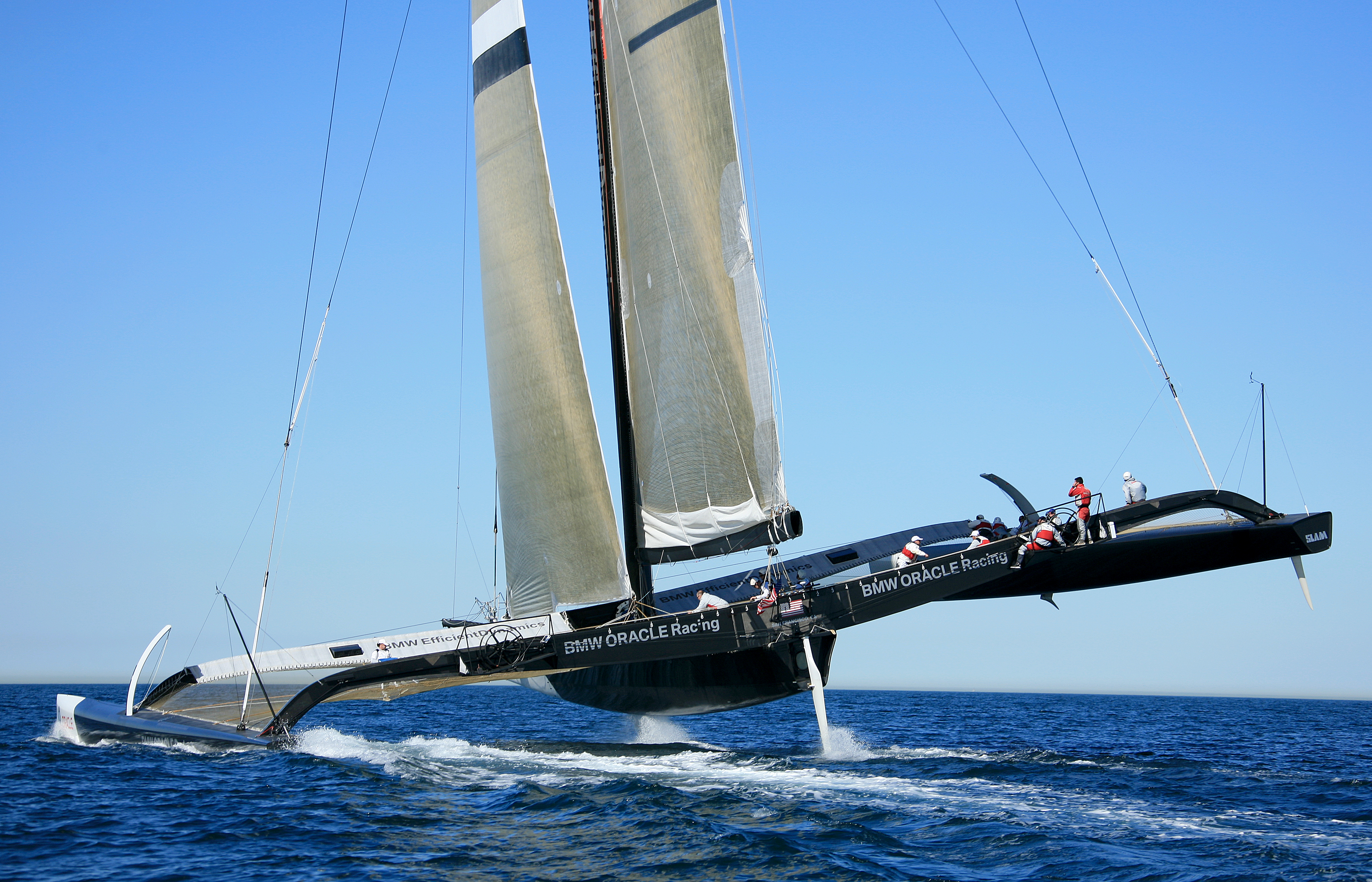
USA-17—a 90-foot-long (27 m) trimaran, type BOR90.

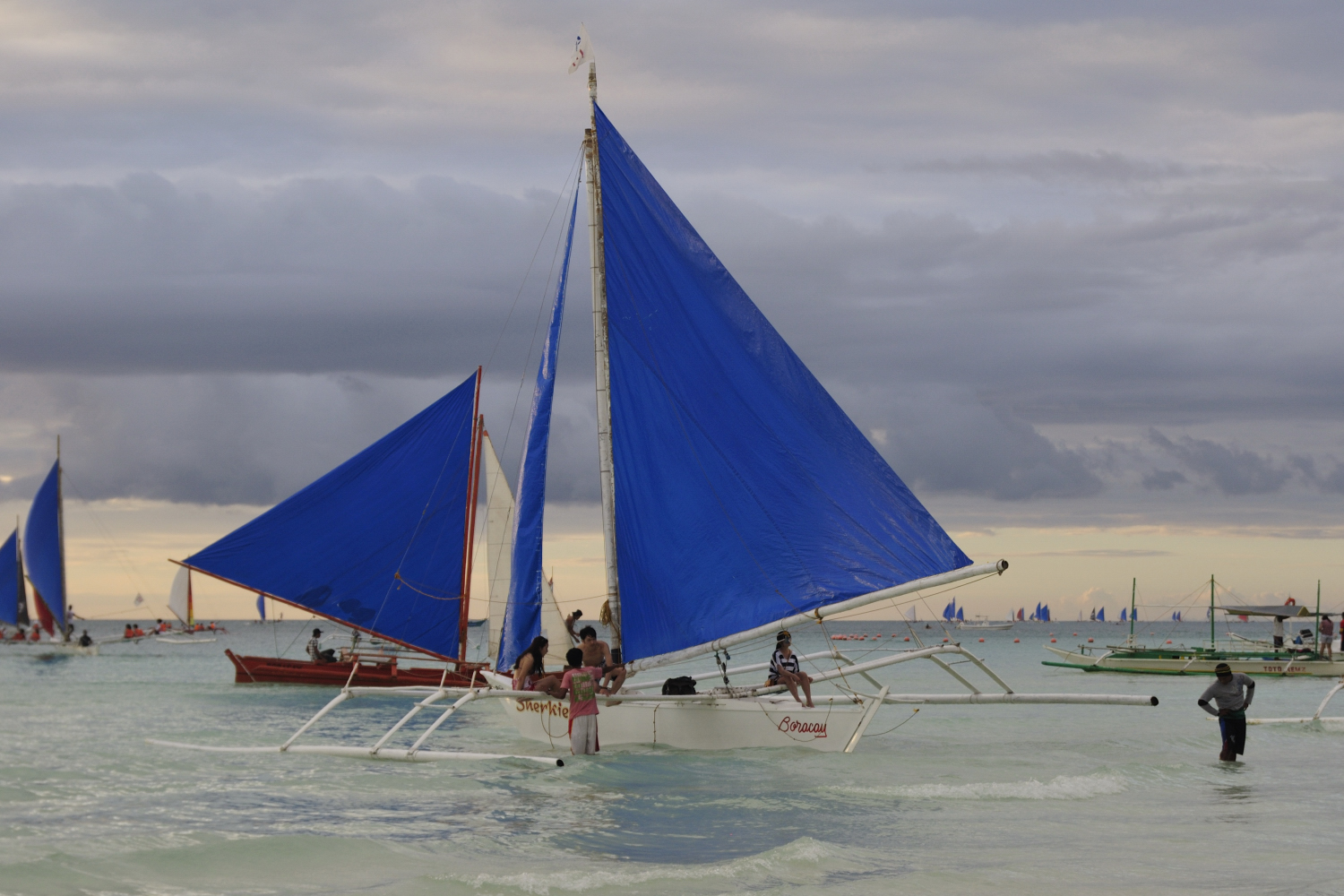
A traditional paraw double-outrigger sailboat (bangka) from the Philippines

A trimaran (or double-outrigger) is a multihull boat that comprises a main hull and two smaller outrigger hulls (or "floats") which are attached to the main hull with lateral beams. Most modern trimarans are sailing yachts designed for recreation or racing; others are ferries or warships. They originated from the traditional double-outrigger hulls of the Austronesian cultures of Maritime Southeast Asia; particularly in the Philippines and Eastern Indonesia, where it remains the dominant hull design of traditional fishing boats. Double-outriggers are derived from the older catamaran and single-outrigger boat designs.

== Terminology ==
The word "trimaran" is a portmanteau of "tri" and "(cata)maran", a term that is thought to have been coined by Victor Tchetchet, a pioneering, Ukrainian-born modern multihull designer. Trimarans consist of a main hull connected to outrigger floats on either side by a crossbeam, wing, or other form of superstructure—the traditional Polynesian terms for the hull, each float and connector are vaka, ama and aka, respectively (although trimarans are not traditionally Polynesian, since they instead use single-outrigger and catamaran configurations).

== Sailing trimarans ==
=== History ===
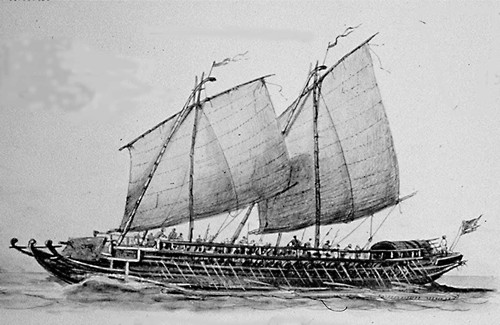
An Iranun lanong, a double-outrigger warship from the Philippines used in the navies of the Sultanates of Maguindanao and Sulu from the 18th to late 19th centuries. They were also commonly used for raids and piracy.

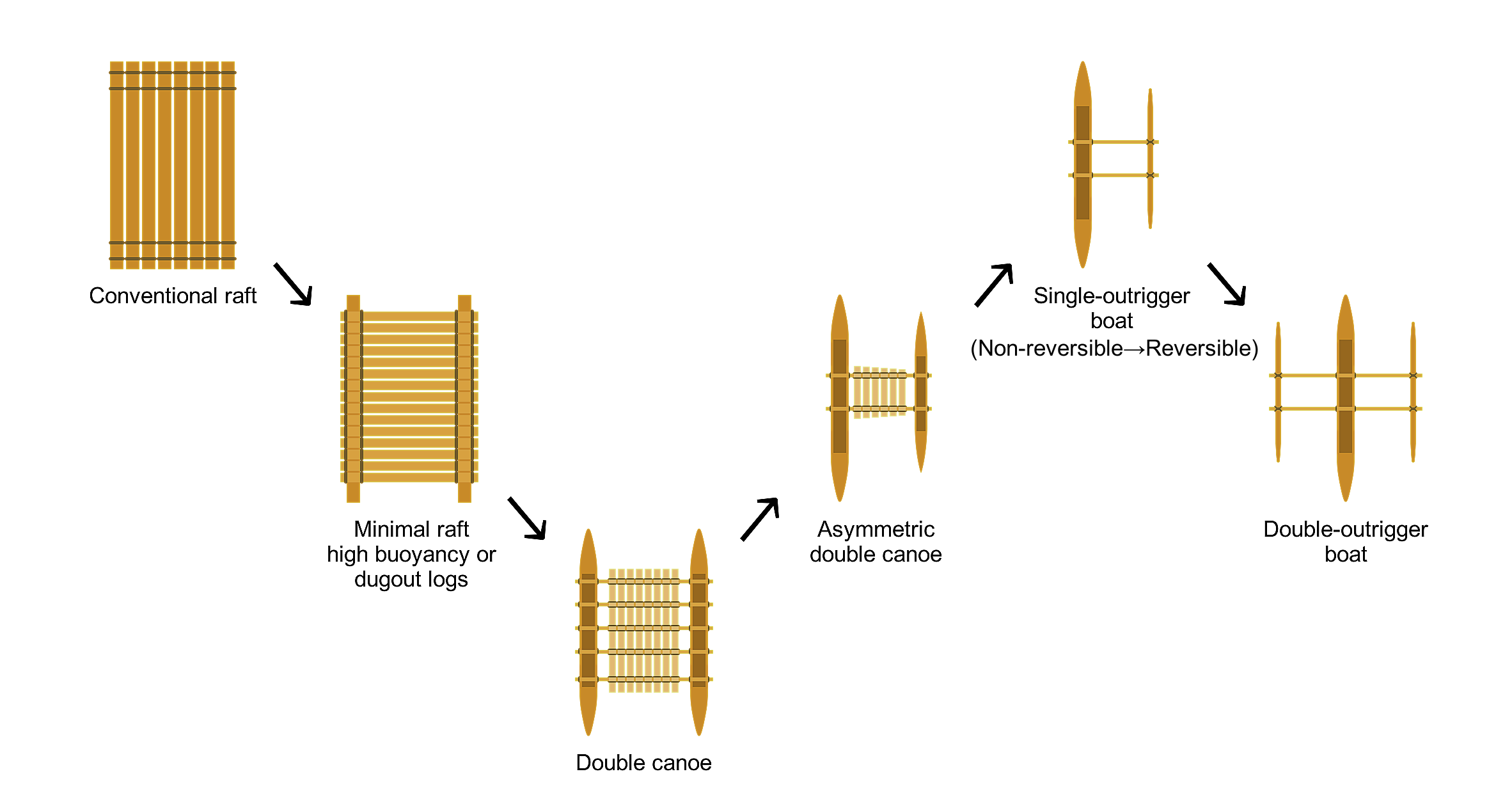
Succession of forms in the development of the Austronesian boat (Mahdi, 1999)

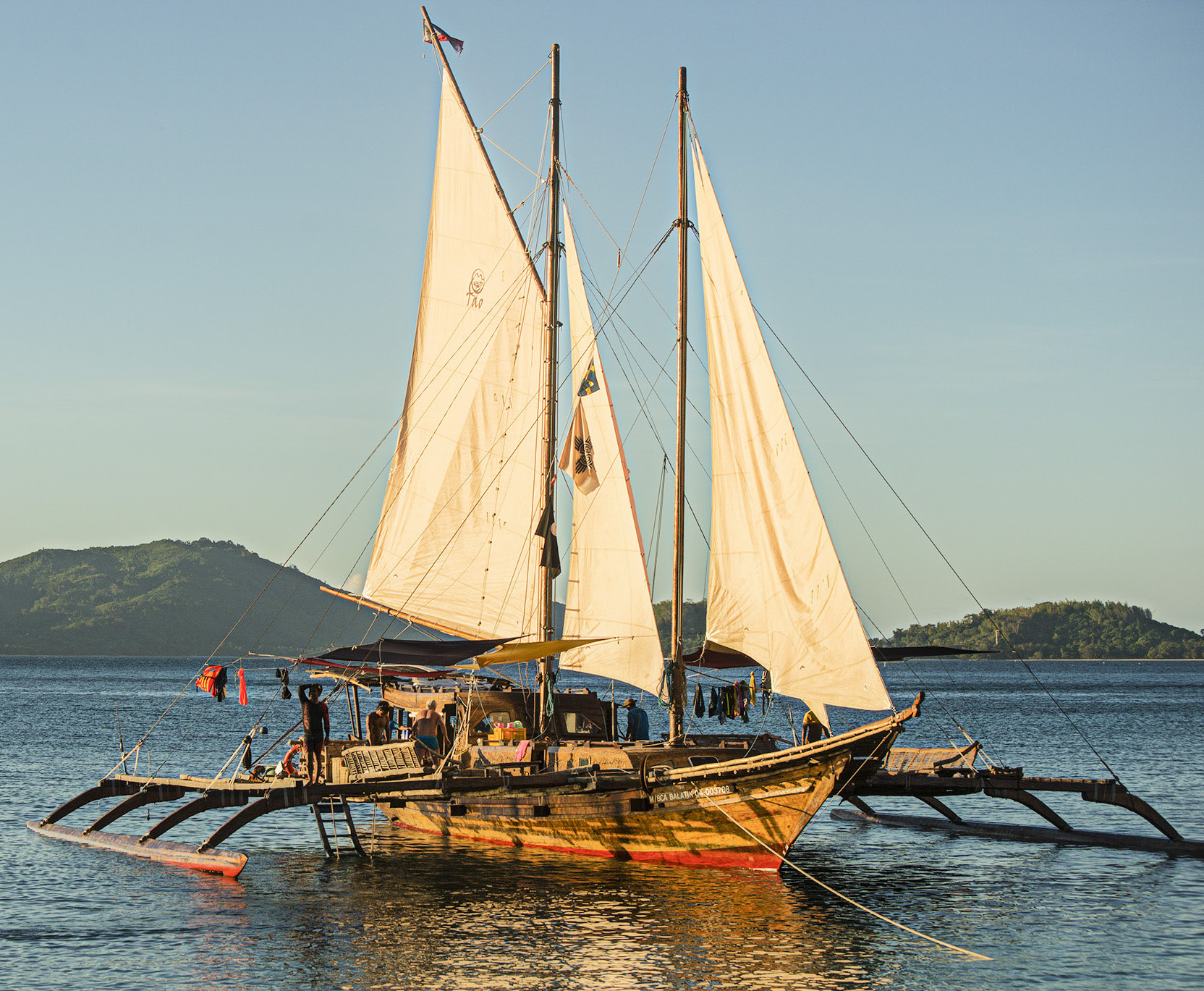
The Balatik, a paraw, a functioning replica of a traditional Austronesian sailing trimaran from the Visayas Islands of the Philippines

The first double-outrigger boats were developed by the Austronesian people and are still widely used today by traditional fishermen in maritime Southeast Asia. It developed from the more ancient single-outrigger boats as a way to deal with the problem of the instability of the latter when tacking leeward. Double-outrigger boats, however, did not develop among Austronesians in Micronesia and Polynesia (although they exist in western Melanesia), where single-outrigger boats and catamarans are used instead.

Warships with double-outriggers were used widely in Maritime Southeast Asia since ancient times up until the early modern period, with examples like the karakoa, lanong kora kora, knabat bogolu, and the Borobudur ships. These were often referred to by Europeans during the colonial era as "proas", a general term which can also refer to single-outriggers and even to native ships without outriggers.

==== 20th century ====
Recreational sailing catamarans and trimarans gained popularity during the 1960s and 1970s. Amateur development of the modern sailing trimaran started in 1945 with the efforts of Victor Tchetchet, a Ukrainian émigré to the US, who built two trimarans made of marine plywood, which were about 24 feet (7.3 metres) long. He is credited with coining the term, "trimaran." In the 1950s and 60s, Arthur Piver designed and built plywood kit trimarans, which were adopted by other homebuilders, but were heavy and not sea-kindly by modern standards. Some of these achieved ocean crossings, nonetheless. Other designers followed, including Jim Brown, Ed Horstman, John Marples, Jay Kantola, Chris White, Norman Cross, Derek Kelsall and Richard Newick, thus bringing the trimaran cruiser to new levels of performance and safety.

Following the homebuilt movement, production models became available. Some trimarans in the 19–36-foot lengths (5.8–11.0 m) are designed as "day-sailers" which can be transported on a road trailer. These include the original Farrier – Corsair folding trimarans, such as the F-27 Sport Cruiser – and original John Westell swing-wing folding trimaran (using the same folding system later adopted also on Quorning Dragonfly) and like trimarans.

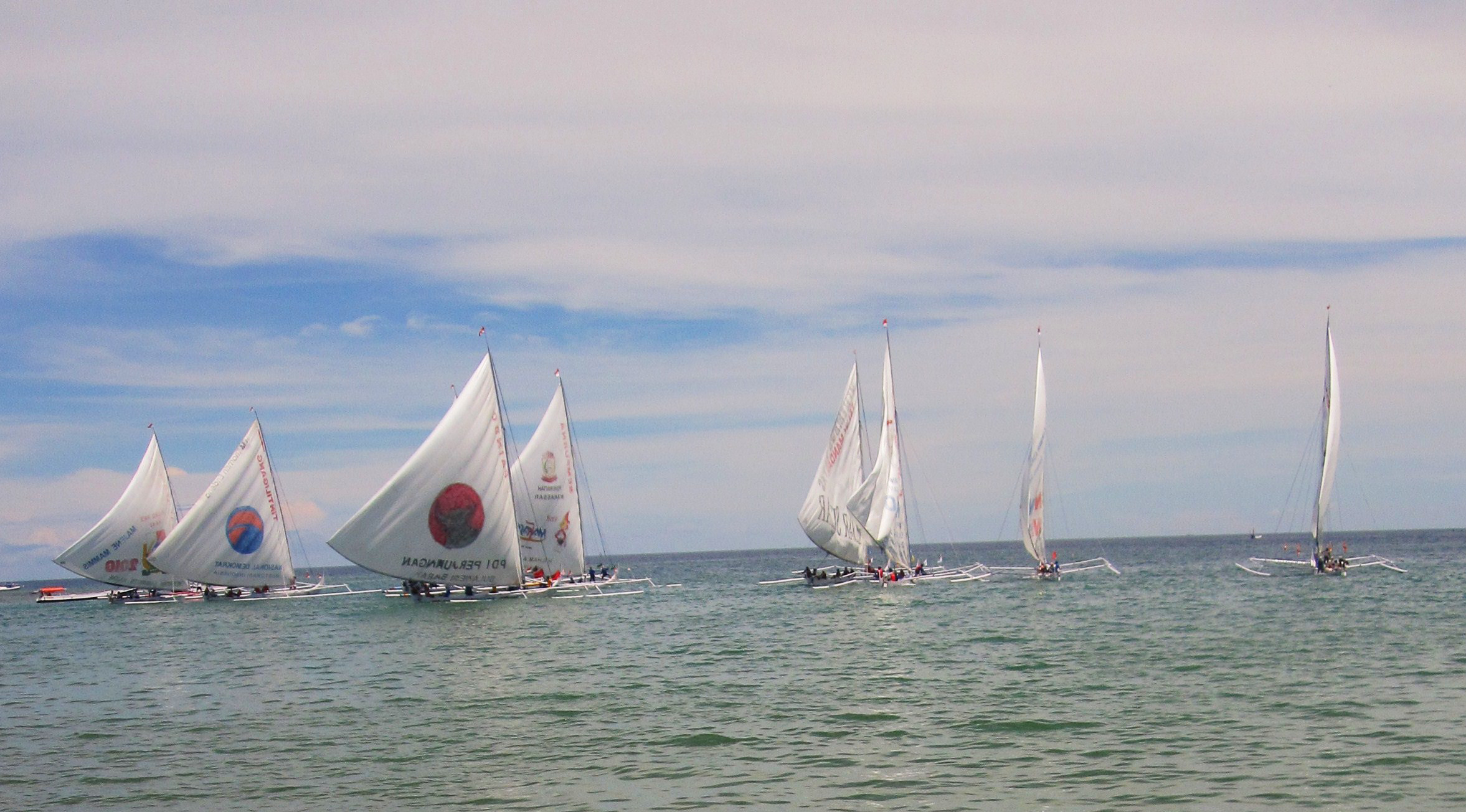
Sandeq double-outrigger sailboats with traditional Austronesian crab claw sails in Majene, West Sulawesi, Indonesia

20th century western-built trimarans typically did not use Austronesian rigging like tanja or crab claw sails. Instead they used a standard Bermuda rig. Trimarans were also typically wider. In addition, trimaran floats were much more buoyant than those of outrigger canoes, to support a large sailplan. This contributed to drag when heavily immersed, and their level of immersion indicates when to reef. Doran (1972) claimed that both the traditional double-outrigger vinta of the Philippines and the single-outrigger wa of the Caroline Islands were still faster than the western-style trimaran used at the time.

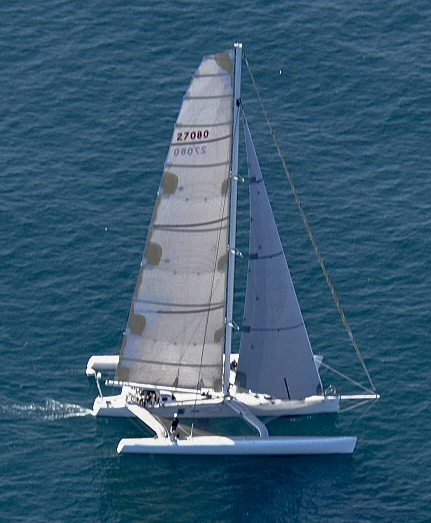
LoeRea, a 60-foot (18-metre) trimaran used in the movie Waterworld.

=== Folding trimarans ===
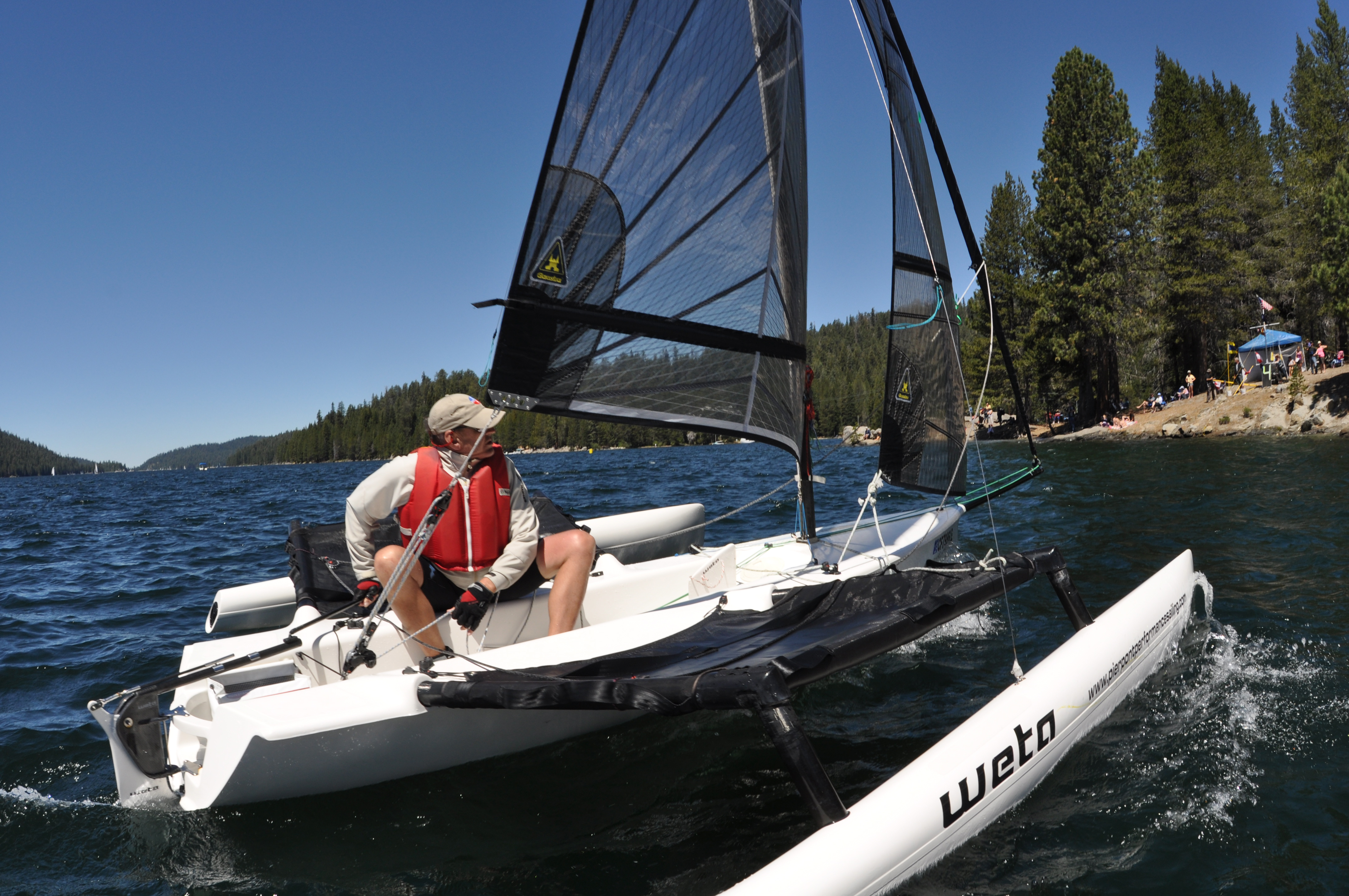
Weta Trimaran racing in the High Sierra Regatta

Several manufacturers build trimarans in which the floats can be removed, repositioned, or folded near to the main hull. This allows them to be trailerable and/or to fit in a normal monohull space in a marina. Several mechanisms allow the amas or outriggers to be stored compactly:

- Demountable fixed tubes that are assembled before launching.
- Telescoping tubes
- Hinge and latch system that allows the amas to fold over the main hull to reduce width for trailing.
- Vertical folding that lifts the amas upwards and over the main hull.
- Horizontal articulation that moves the amas forward or backwards at the same level as the hull.
- Horizontal folding of the amas towards the main hull.

=== Safety ===
Trimaran safety features include amas with multiple sealed partitions, controls that all run to the cockpit, a collision bulkhead, partial or full cockpit coverings or windshields, and drain holes in the cockpit that can adequately drain the cockpit quickly, among other things.

Trimaran capsizes are more likely to be of the pitchpole type than a roll to one side due to their higher sideways stability and speeds. Capsized trimarans are harder to turn upright after they have turtled than monohull boats. While some capsized trimarans righted by sideways rotation may suffer heavy damage to mast and rigging, many modern and ancient trimarans are explicitly designed for this method of righting. Harnesses pulling on the stern toward the bow, or from the bow toward the stern of capsized trimarans have been shown to be able to successfully turn them end-over-end. Several design features reduce the chance of pitch-pole capsize; these include having wing nets with an open weave designed to reduce windage and decks and nets that shed water easily. The best way to avoid capsize is to reduce sail in heavy weather.

== Competition and records ==
Thomas Coville holds the world record of 49 days and 3 hours for sailing solo around the world in the trimaran Sodebo Ultim, finishing on December 25, 2016. The previous record was set by Francis Joyon on January 20, 2008. The 51-year-old Frenchman circled the planet alone in 57 days, 13 hours, 34 minutes, 6 seconds in a trimaran. He beat British sailor Ellen MacArthur's record set in February 2005 for which she spent just over 71 days at sea.

Francis Joyon and a crew of five in the maxi trimaran IDEC SPORT set the absolute (wind or mechanically powered) time for the fastest maritime circumnavigation, in 40 days 23 hours 30 minutes 30 seconds of sailing between Dec 2016 and Jan 2017. Their average speed was 26.85 knots (30.71 MPH) over a total distance of 26,412 nautical miles (48,915 kilometres; 30,394 miles). In early 2020, the same boat won a race retracing the tea clipper route from Hong Kong to London in just under 32 days – one-third the time it took the clippers to sail the route.

Hydroptère, an experimental sailing hydrofoil trimaran, briefly reached 56.3 knots (104.3 km/h; 64.8 mph) near Fos-sur-Mer, but capsized and turtled shortly thereafter.

=== 33rd America's Cup ===
Competing with a giant trimaran the BMW Oracle Racing team won the 2010 America's Cup for the Golden Gate Yacht Club on February 14, 2010, off Valencia, Spain. The team beat the giant catamaran Alinghi 2–0 in the best-of-three series, becoming the first American syndicate to win the cup since 1992. The large rigid wing sail of the USA 17 trimaran provided a decisive advantage and the trimaran won the America's Cup by a considerable margin in each race.

=== Powerboat ===
Earthrace broke the world record for circumnavigating the globe in a motorized boat in 2008 in just under 61 days.

== Trimaran ships ==
The trimaran configurations has also been used for both passenger ferries and warships. The Australian shipbuilding company, Austal, investigated the comparative merits of trimaran ships, catamarans and monohulls. It found that there was an optimum location for the outer hulls in terms of minimizing wave generation and consequent power requirements for operating at high speeds with a payload of 1,000 tonnes. It further found that such a trimaran configuration was superior to a catamaran for roll and lateral force in a beam sea and superior in suppressing motion sickness resulting from a head sea.

The negative considerations for trimarans, compared with catamarans or monohulls are:

- A more complicated and consequently more expensive hull structure for the payload, making them more suited for low-density cargo or passengers.
- More complicated geometry and large size per unit of cargo carried, which makes docking more difficult than for a catamaran or monohull.

Between 2005 and 2020, Austal had built 14 aluminum high-speed trimaran ships, 11 of which were for the US Navy. In 2020, they had 11 trimarans under construction or under order. In addition to shipyards in Australia and the US, the company had shipyards in Vietnam and the Philippines.

In 2005 Austal delivered the 127-metre trimaran (417 ft) Benchijigua Express to Spanish ferry operator Fred Olsen, S.A. for service in the Canary Islands. Capable of carrying 1,280 passengers and 340 cars, or equivalents, at speeds up to 40 knots, this boat was the longest aluminum ship in the world at the time of delivery. A modern warship, the RV Triton was commissioned by British defence contractor QinetiQ in 2000. In October 2005, the United States Navy commissioned for evaluation the construction of a General Dynamics litoral combat ship trimaran designed and built by Austal.

=== High-speed ferries ===
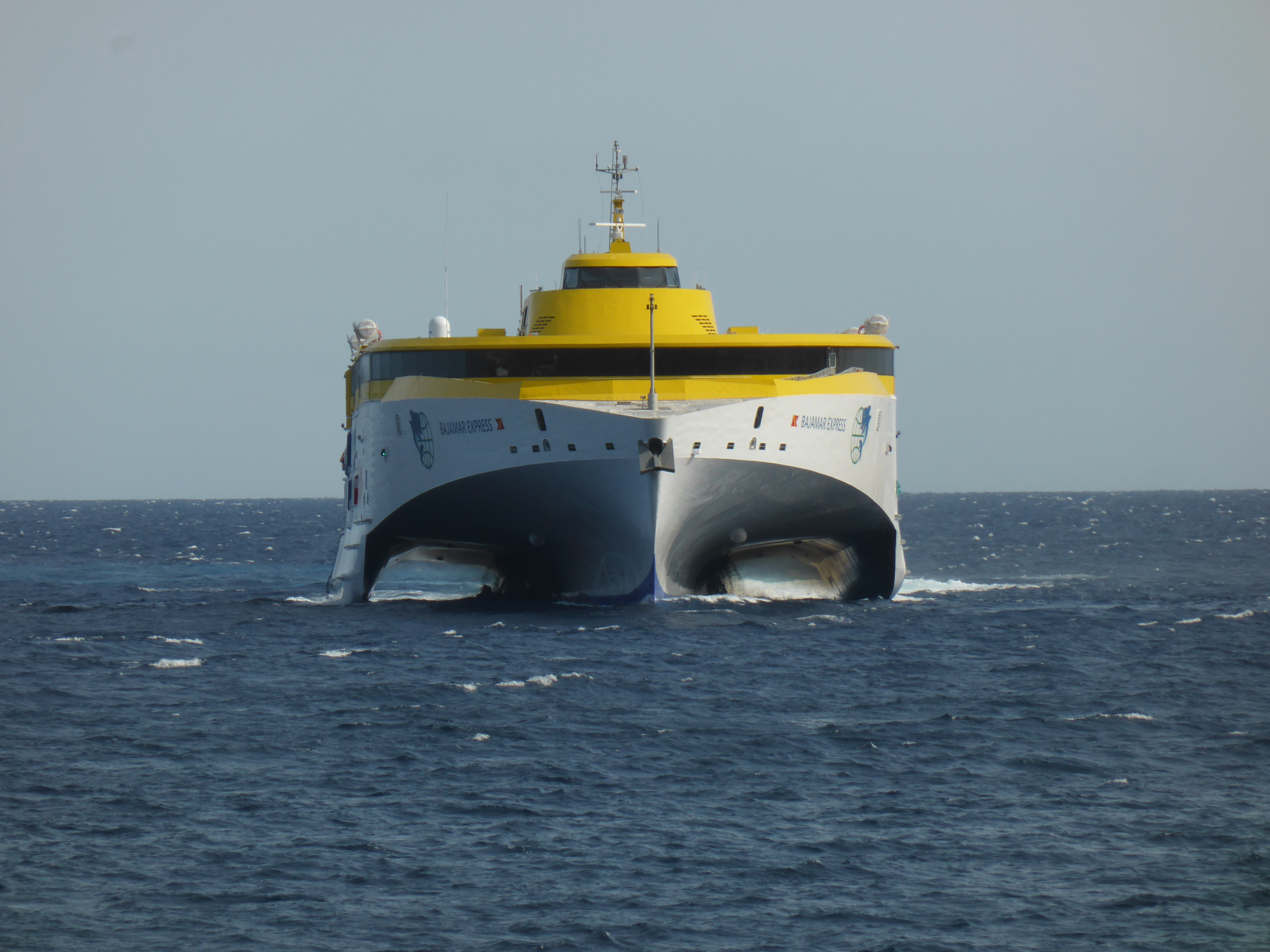
HSC Bajamar Express

High-speed craft are governed by a code that applies to those designed for international passenger voyages that are shorter than four hours from a port of refuge, or cargo craft of 500 gross tonnage no more than eight hours from a port of refuge. All passengers are provided with a seat and there are no enclosed sleeping berths.

The demand for high-speed ferries started in the late 1970s for ferries built mostly in Norway. Ultimately, two Australian shipyards came to prominence, Incat and Austal. They were initially built by many shipyards, but by the turn of the century only two companies were still building larger vessels of over 70 metres and 3,000 Gross Tons. While Incat has specialized in wave-piercing catamarans, Austal has developed high-speed trimarans.

In 2010 Austal built the 102 metre Hull 270, although they were unable to find a buyer for the ship until it was sold to Condor Ferries in 2015 when it was named HSC Condor Liberation and began operating to the Channel Islands. Prospects for trimaran ferries picked up in 2017 when Fred. Olsen Express ordered two 118-metre trimarans for their Canary Islands services, named Bajamar Express and Bañaderos Express. In 2018 a Japanese company ordered an 83-metre trimaran ferry.

=== Naval ships ===
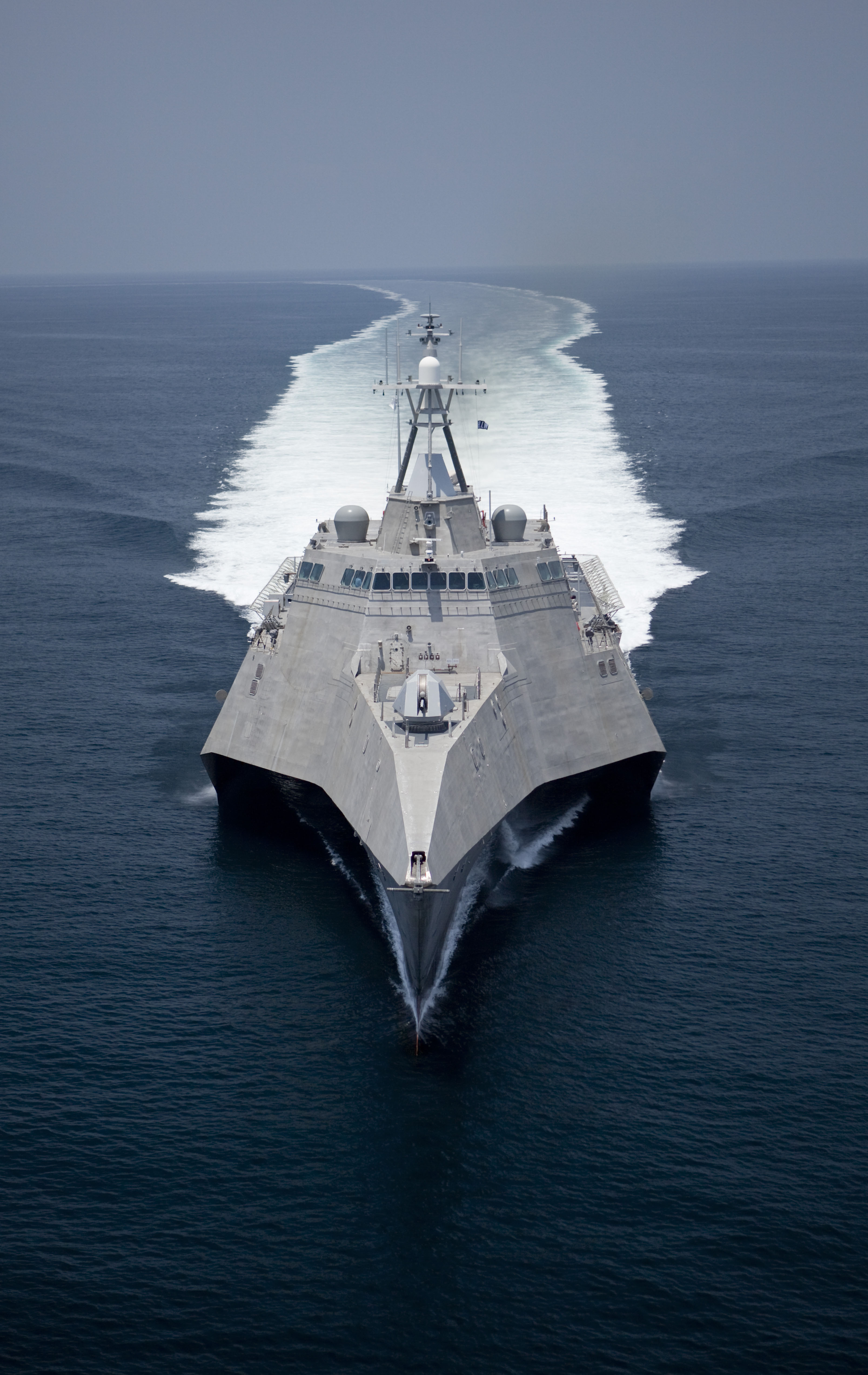
Trimaran warship, USS Independence

The first use of trimaran hull designs in modern navies was in the RV Triton, a research vessel for the Royal Navy. She was built as a technology demonstrator ship for the Royal Navy's Future Surface Combatant, and has been used to prove the viability of the hull form. Since 2007 the ship has been used by the Australian Customs and Border Protection Service's Customs Marine Unit.

Littoral combat ships built by General Dynamics at Bath Iron Works are of a trimaran design. USS Independence (LCS-2) is the first of these ships. Littoral combat ships built by Lockheed are of a monohull design.

First launched on August 31, 2012, at Bali Strait, 63M Carbon Fibre Composite Trimaran Fast Missile Boat (Indonesian: Kapal Cepat Rudal [KCR]) named Klewang-class fast attack craft (Klewang- means a traditional Indonesian single edge sword), was the first stealth trimaran of the Indonesian Navy built by North Sea Boats at Banyuwangi, East Java, Indonesia. Designed by New Zealand Naval Architects LOMOcean Marine this ship combined a number of existing advanced technologies into a single, unique platform; a wave-piercer trimaran hull from, constructed exclusively of infused vinylester carbon fibre cored sandwich materials for all structural elements, with external "stealth" geometry and features intended to reduce detection. The KRI Klewang (625) caught fire because of an electrical short-circuit in the engine room during a maintenance period on September 28, 2012, and was a total loss.

43-meter Ocean Eagle trimarans from CMN wharf with design from Nigel Irens und Prolarge based on the Ocean Adventurer concept will provide coastal protection for Mozambique.

== Image gallery sailing trimarans ==
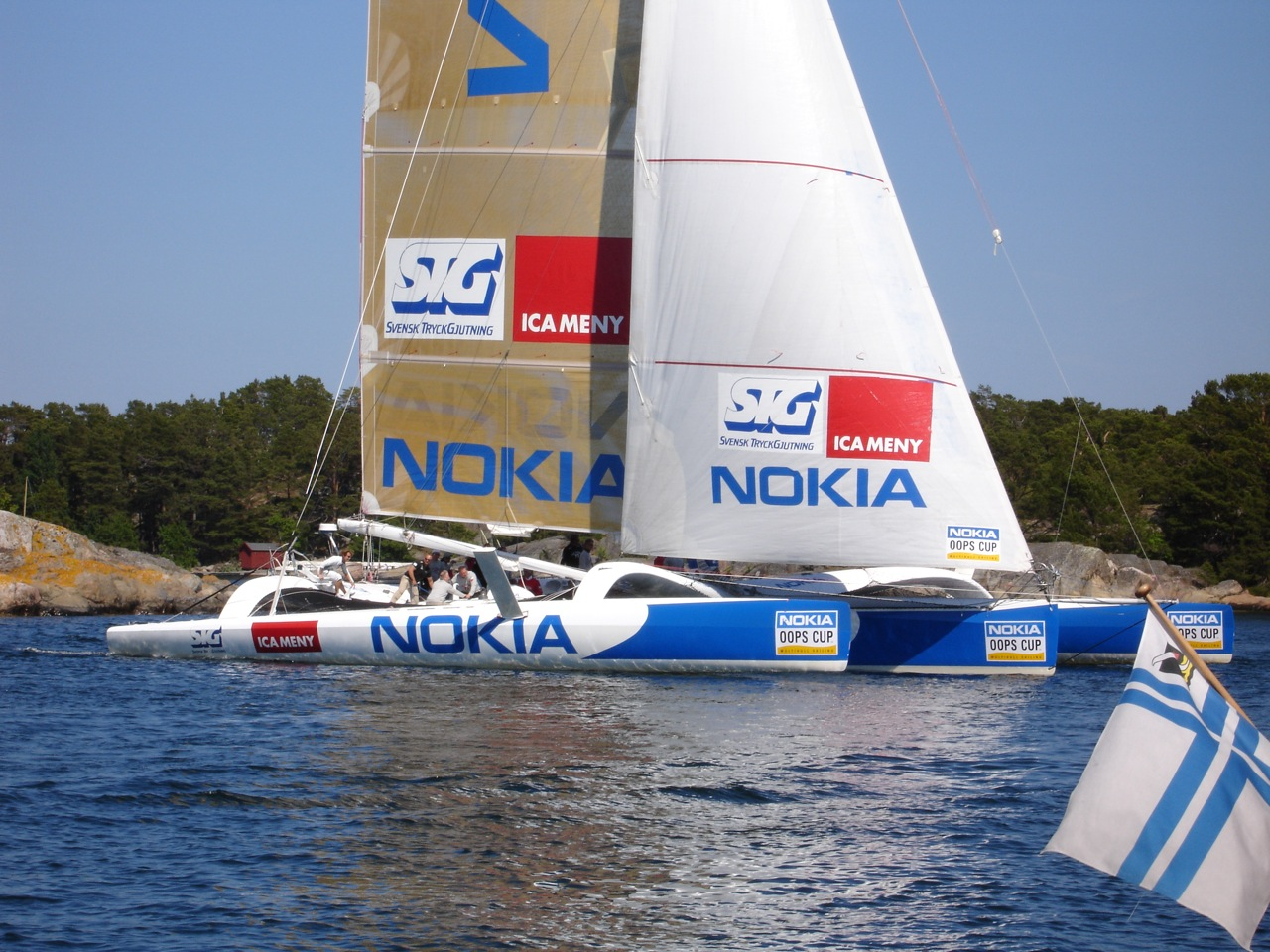
Nokia in 2005, a 60-foot-long (18 m) trimaran, built for the Open Ocean Performance Sixties (ORMA 60) series.

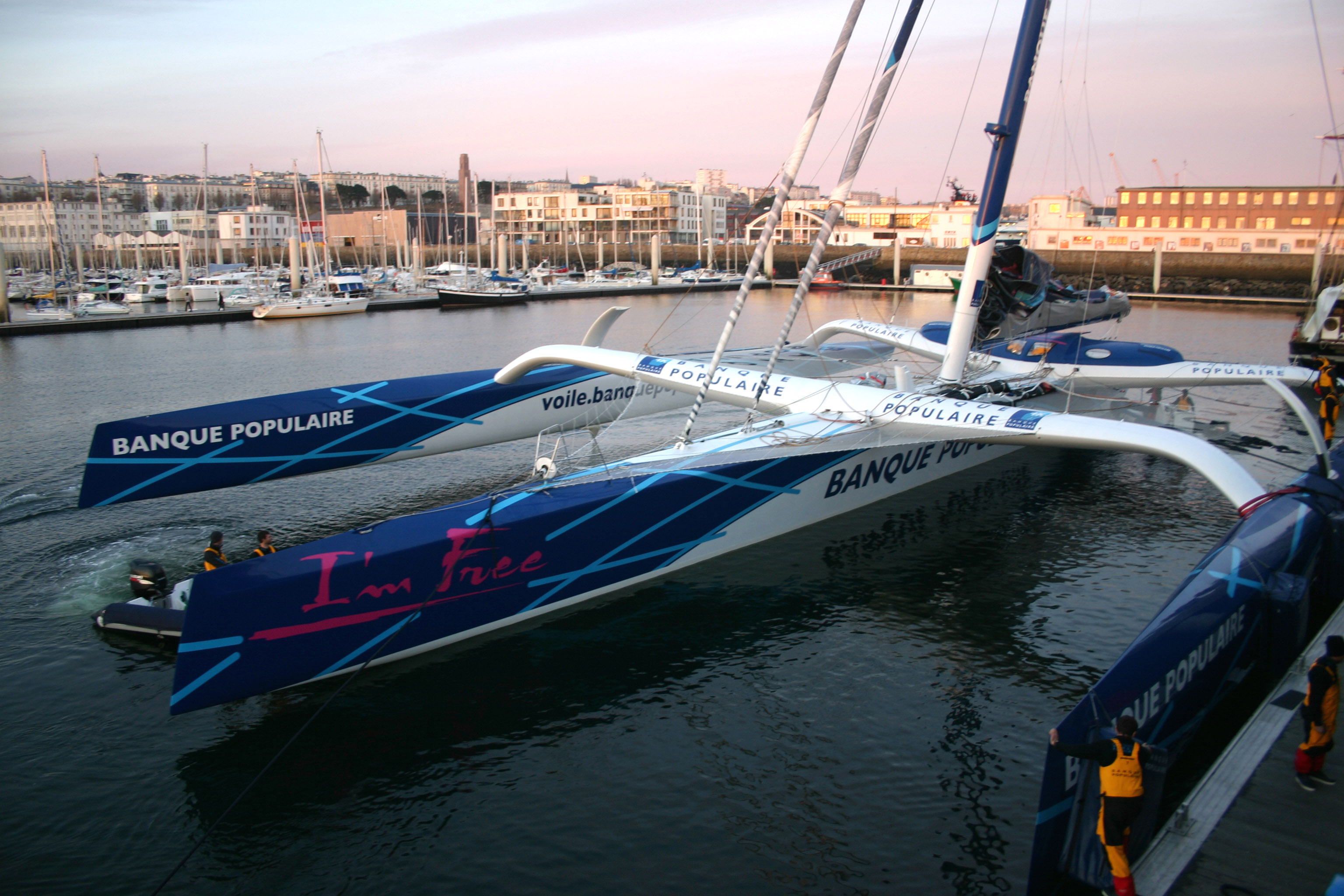
Banque Populaire V in 2009. At the time, the largest maxi-trimaran and holding the 24 hours distance and transatlantic records.

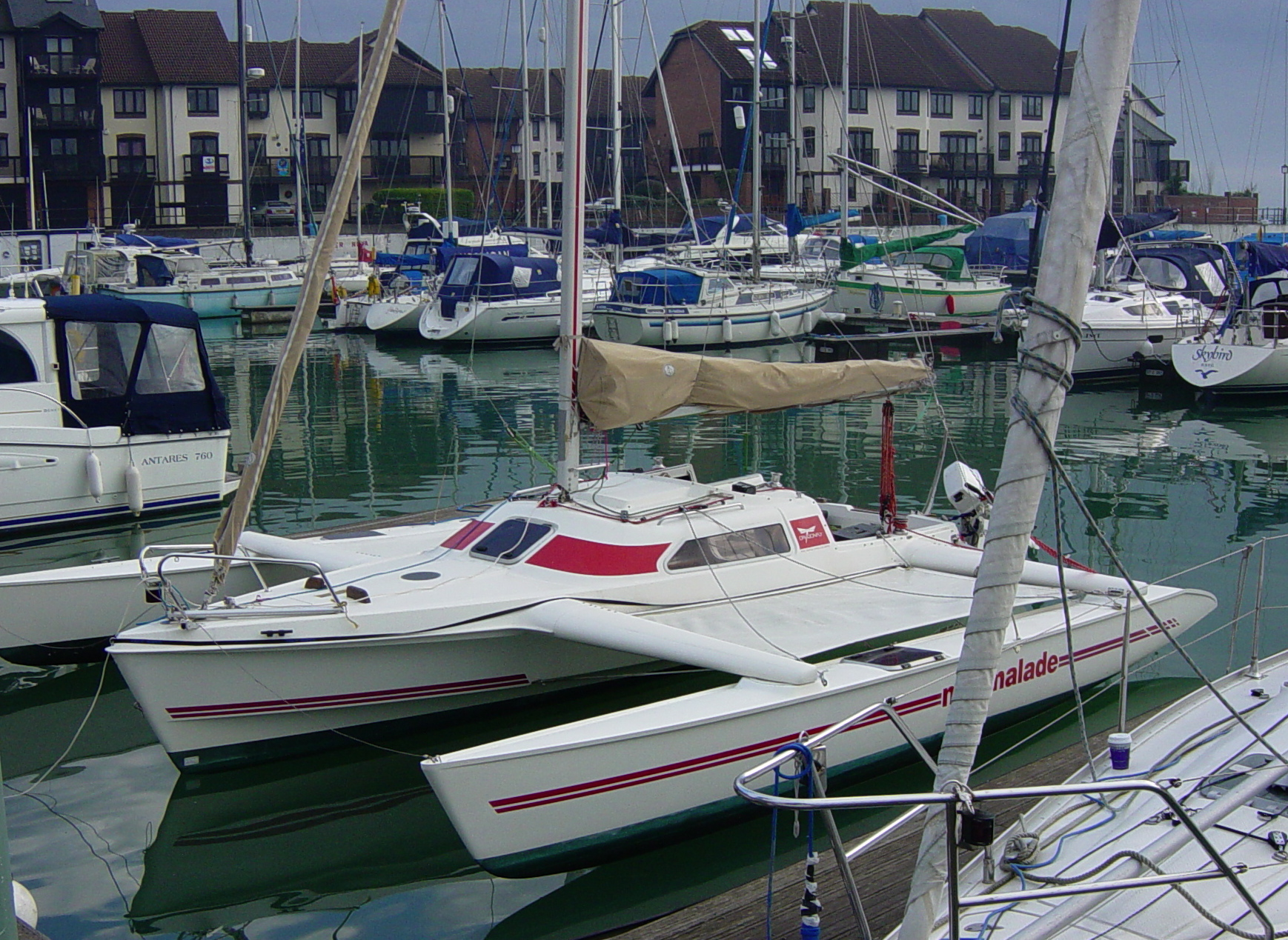
Foldable trimaran with the floats in extended position.

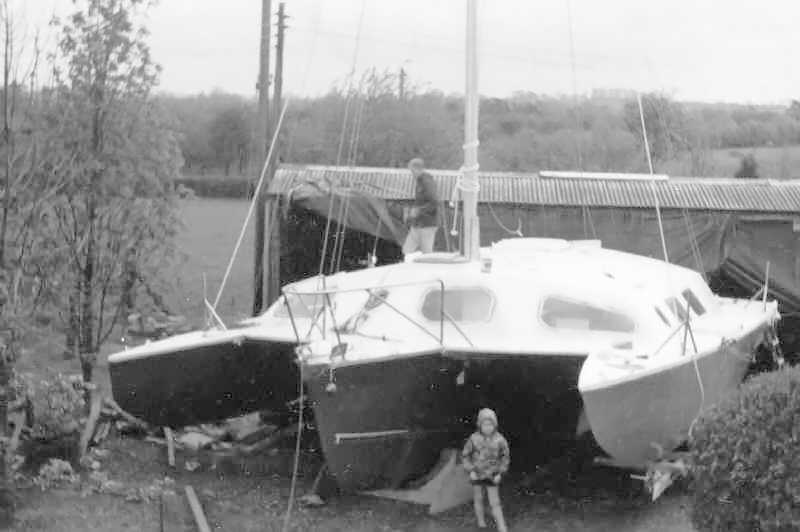
A home-built cruising trimaran under construction in 1972.

== Image gallery engine driven trimarans ==
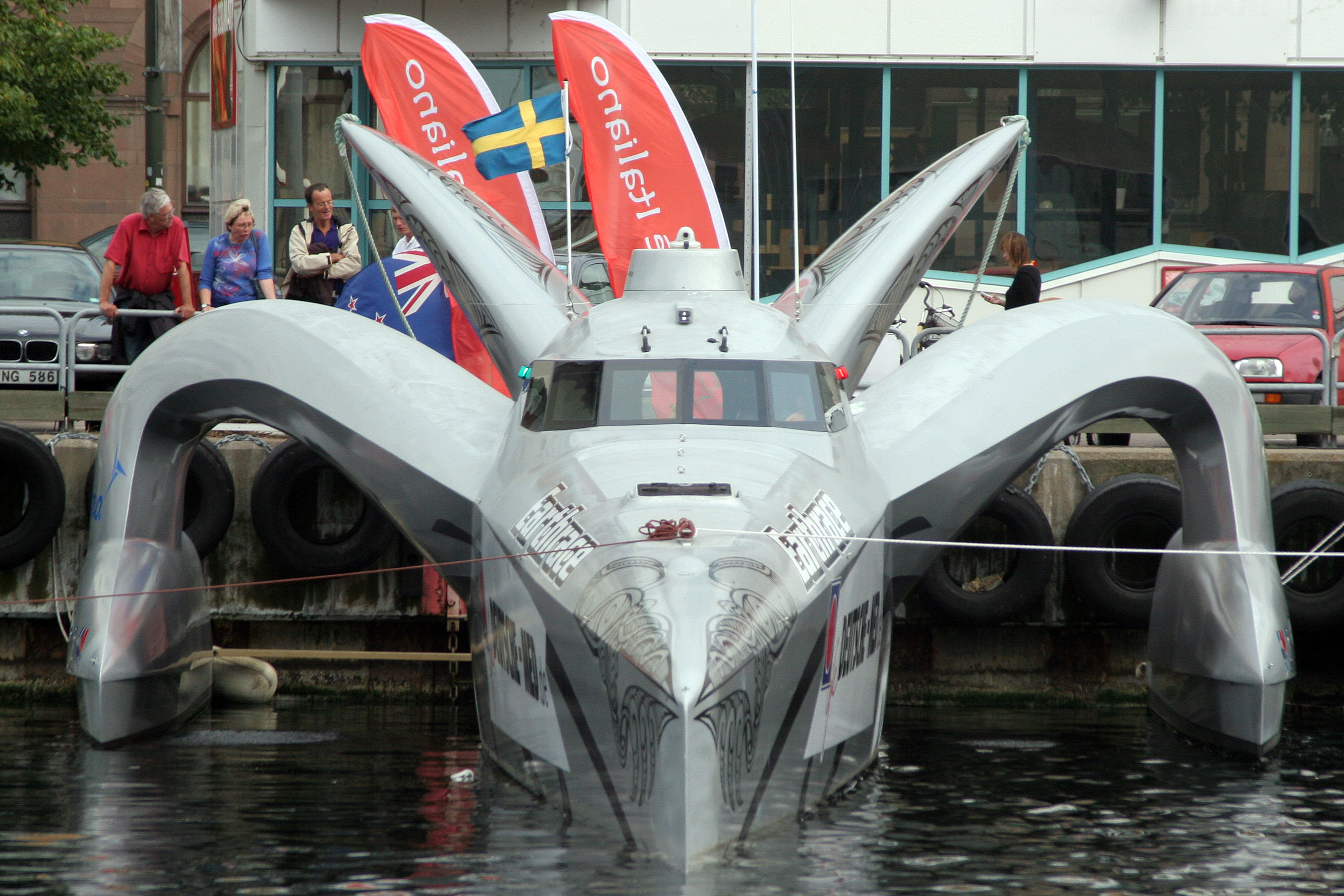
Speedboat Earthrace at a dock in Malmö, Sweden.

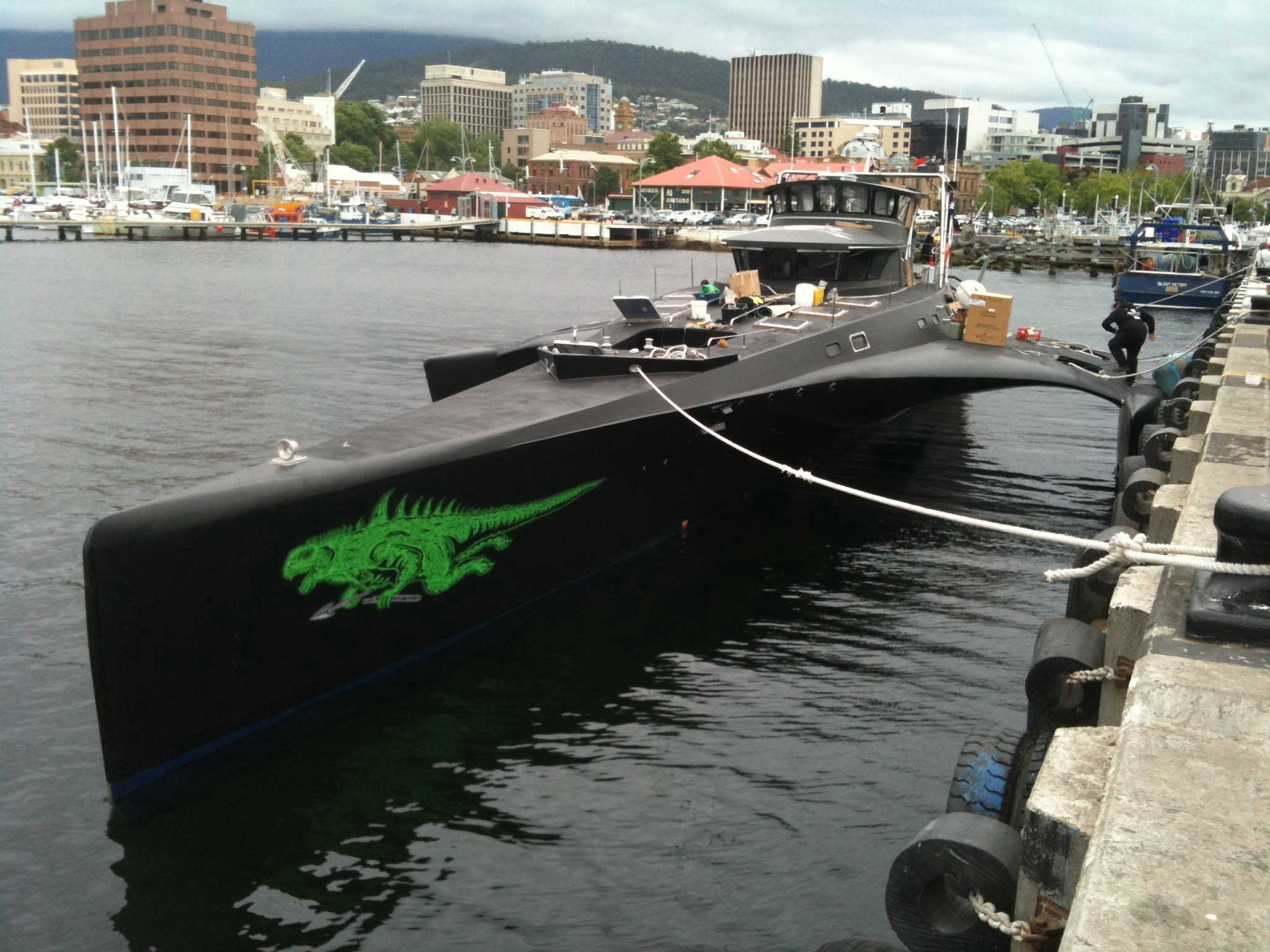
MV Gojira at port in Hobart, Tasmania.

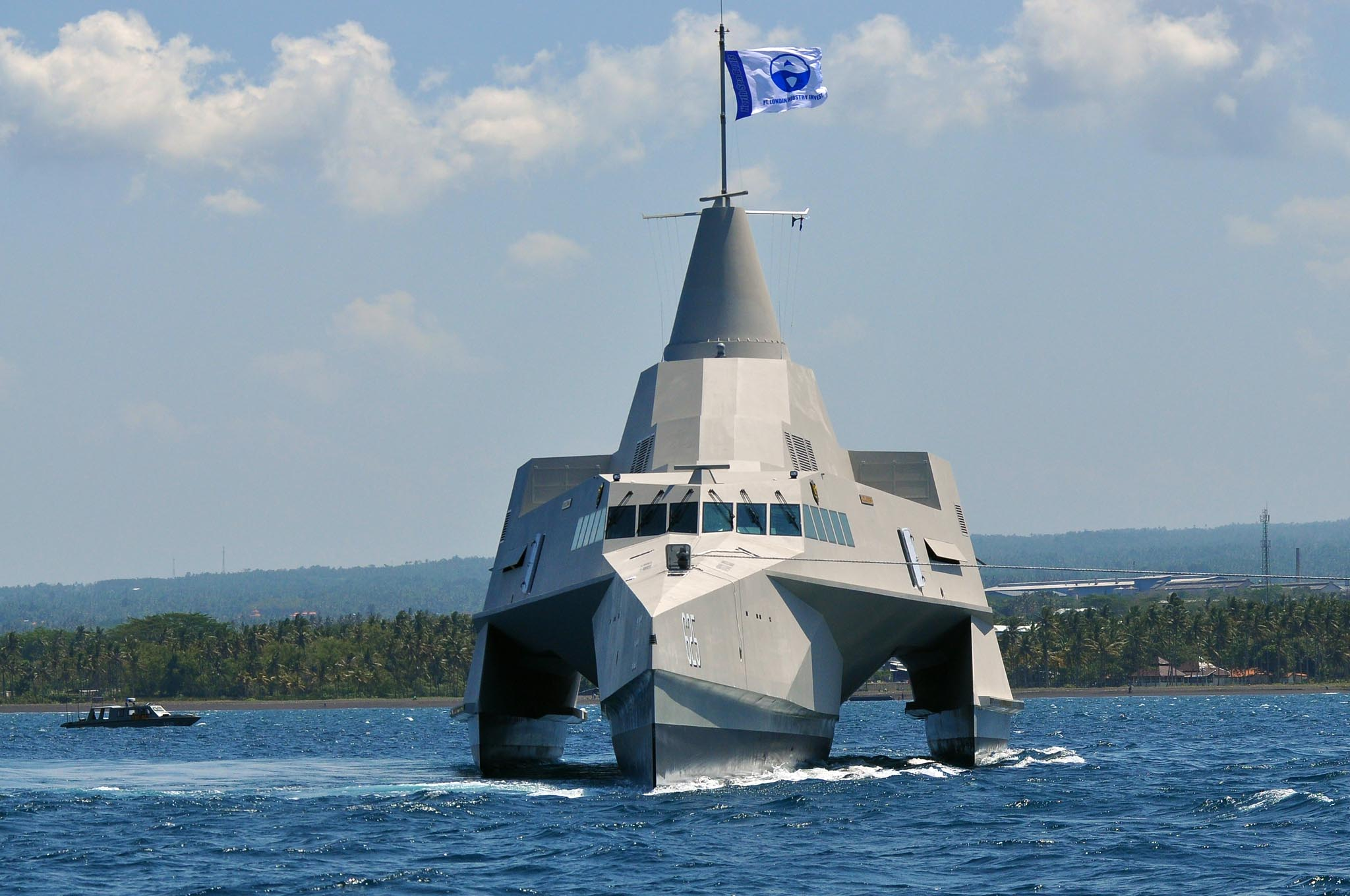
KRI Klewang at Bali Strait in Indonesia.

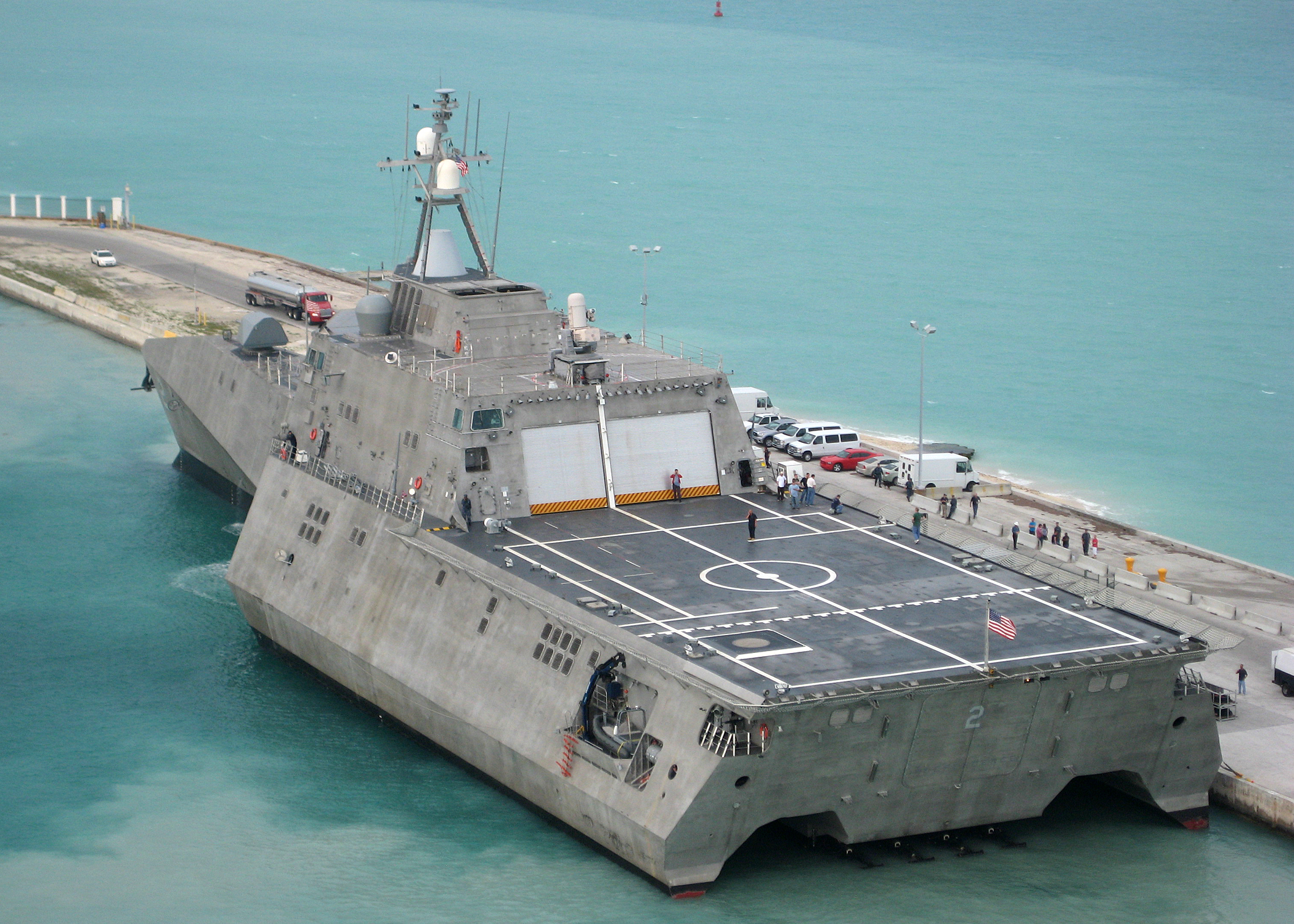
Stern view of Independence

== See also ==
- List of multihulls
- Bangka
- Catamaran
- Multihull
- Sailing
- Turtling (sailing)
