= Leontophoros =

Large wooden ship from classical Greek

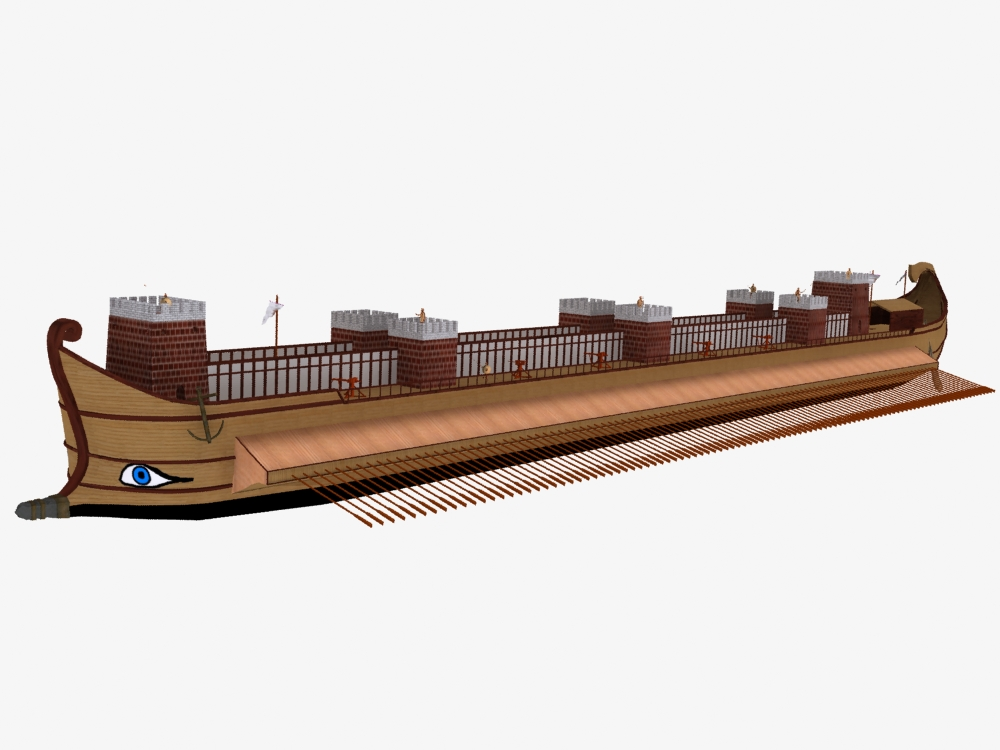
Fanciful digital reconstruction of Leontophoros.

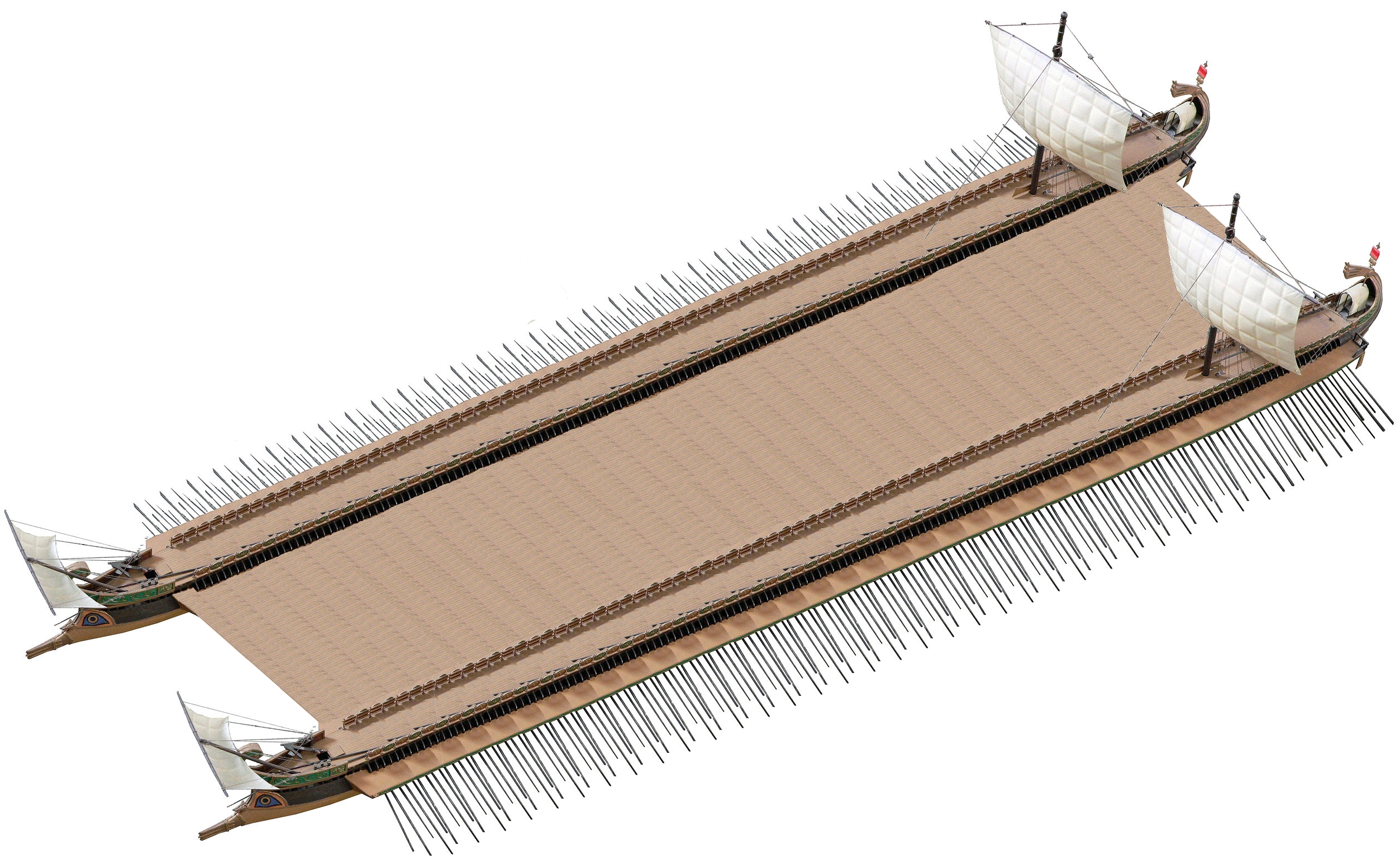
Speculative illustration of the Tessarakonteres with catamaran hulls, as Casson suggests

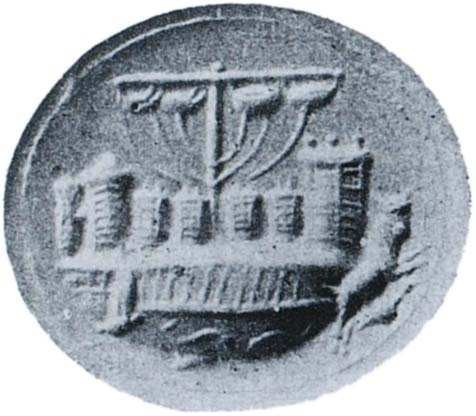
A ship associated with Syracusia, c. 1st century BC – 1st century AD

Leontophoros was a famous ship built in Heraclea for Lysimachos; it was one of the largest wooden ships ever built. There exists a textual fragment by Memnon, the historian of Heraclea, describing the ship:

There was one eight (octareme), which was called Leontophoros, remarkable for its size and beauty. In this ship while there were a hundred men rowing each file so that there were eight hundred men from each side, from both sides there were one thousand six hundred oarsmen. Those who fought from the deck were one thousand two hundred. And there were two helmsmen.

According to Tarn the ship was built for Demetrius I of Macedon and after his death passed to Lysimachos, but this is disputed. This and other information on the ship was analysed by Morrison. Using the data provided by Vitruvius on the space allowed for each oarsman, Morrison concluded that the ship was at least 110 m long and almost 10 m wide. This and other parameters of the ship are a subject of controversy. Objections are raised against the idea of a ship of such size:

1. With the dimensions proposed by Morrison (110 m long, almost 10 m wide), such a long vessel would have been difficult to turn.
2. A seagoing ship built entirely of wood might be safe in the size range of 70–75 m, but beyond that, metal bracings are needed to strengthen the hull.
3. The size proposed by Morrison is longer than the longest ships of the line of the 19th century. If their hull becomes too long, the hull cannot withstand differential pressures caused by surface waves.
4. It would be surprising if a ship of such size did not suffer from structural problems.

Unlike other known super-ships of the Hellenistic age, Tessarakonteres and Syracusia, Leontophoros actually participated in battles (Plutarch, "Demetrius", 20, 43, Memnon, 8.4).

Lysimachos was killed in 281 BC, and his fleet, including Leontophoros, was inherited by Ptolemy Keraunos, who then became the king of Macedonia. It is said that the ship was responsible for the defeat of Antigonus II by Ptolemy in 280 BC. According to Memnon:

When battle was joined, the victory went to Ptolemy who routed the fleet of Antigonus, with the ships from Heracleia fighting most bravely of all; and of the ships from Heracleia, the prize went to the eight-banker "lion-bearer".

Morrison writes:

In spite of her success in battle, this was an experiment which was not repeated, but Lysimachos's ship was nevertheless remembered for its beauty.

== See also ==
- Tessarakonteres, a large Egyptian ship with disputed size
- Syracusia, a large ancient Greek ship
- Jong, a type of large Javanese ship, some are noted to be larger than the largest Portuguese ships
- Baochuan, the Chinese treasure ship
- Hellenistic-era warships
