= Crossbow (disambiguation) =

A crossbow is a projectile-shooting weapon.

Crossbow may also refer to:

== Media and entertainment ==
- Crossbow (TV series), based on William Tell
- Crossbow (video game)
- Crossbow (film), a 2007 Australian coming-of-age drama
- Crossbow (journal), a UK conservative publication
- "The Crossbow", a 1962 episode of Bolek and Lolek

== Military ==
- Operation Crossbow, a World War II campaign
  - Operation Crossbow (film), based on the above operation
- HMS Crossbow (D96), a destroyer in Britain's Royal Navy

== Technology ==
- Crossbow Technology, a former California-based electronics company
- Crossbow, the project name for Solaris network virtualization and resource control
- Crossbow, the code name for Windows Mobile 6.0

== Transportation ==
- Crossbow (proa), an early 1970s asymmetrical catamaran
  - Crossbow II (proa), a late 1970s successor craft
- KTM X-Bow (read as "Crossbow"), a sports car

== See also ==
- Crossbow bolt, a projectile
