= Monocat =

A monocat is a type of multihull with a single hull fore and two hulls aft. One could say that it begins like a monohull and ends like a catamaran, Hence the name. Narrower than the usual multihulls, it comes in motor and sailing flavours. It combines advantages of both mono and multihulls. A quite famous one is Jacques Cousteau's Alcyone (1985 ship). French architect Jacques Fauroux has drawn some.
