= Gloucester 15 =

Sailboat class

Development
- Designer: Rod Macalpine-Downie and Dick Gibbs
- Location: United States
- Year: 1987
- No. built: 6,000
- Builder: Gloucester Yachts
- Role: Sailing dinghy

Boat
- Displacement: 600 lb (272 kg)
- Draft: 4.08 ft (1.24 m) with centerboard down

Hull
- Type: monohull
- Construction: fiberglass
- LOA: 15.00 ft (4.57 m)
- LWL: 14.04 ft (4.28 m)
- Beam: 6.00 ft (1.83 m)

Hull appendages
- Keel: centerboard
- Rudder: transom-mounted rudder

Rig
- Rig type: Bermuda rig

Sails
- Sailplan: fractional rigged sloop
- Total sail area: 150.00 sq ft (13.935 m^{2})

The Gloucester 15 is an American sailing dinghy that was designed by Rod Macalpine-Downie and Dick Gibbs and first built in 1987.

The Gloucester 15 is a development of the Chrysler Marine 1972 Mutineer 15 design, with a heavier displacement.

== Production ==
The design was built by Gloucester Yachts in the United States, with 6,000 boats completed starting in 1987, but it is now out of production.

== Design ==
The Gloucester 15 is a recreational sailboat, built predominantly of fiberglass, with wood trim. It has a fractional sloop rig, a plumb stem, a vertical transom, a transom-hung rudder controlled by a tiller and a retractable centerboard. It displaces 600 lb (272 kg).

The boat has a draft of 4.08 ft (1.24 m) with the centerboard extended and 8 in (20 cm) with it retracted, allowing beaching or ground transportation on a trailer.

The design has a hull speed of 5.03 kn (9.32 km/h).

== See also ==
- List of sailing boat types

Related development

- Mutineer 15
