= Rod Macalpine-Downie =

English sailboat designer and sailor

- Born: James Roderick Macalpine-Downie; May 9, 1934; Appin, Argyll and Bute, Scotland
- Died: 9 January 1986 (aged 51)
- Education: Eton College
- Known for: Yacht designer
- Spouse: Shirley Macalpine-Downie
- Children: 3

James Roderick Macalpine-Downie (9 May 1934 – 9 January 1986), known as Rod Macalpine-Downie, was an English multihull sailboat designer and sailor.

Son of Lieutenant-Colonel Archibald James Macalpine-Downie (died 1958), M.B.E., Royal Tank Regiment, of a landed gentry family of Appin, he was a King's Scholar at Eton with a focus on biology, but seriously considered a career as a concert violinist. Macalpine-Downie and his wife, Shirley Agnes (née Reid), had two sons and a daughter.

== Design career ==
After seeing a Shearwater catamaran while chicken farming in Scotland, Macalpine-Downie resolved to design a superior vessel, producing the Thai Mk4 catamaran.

The Thai Mk4 was extremely successful, winning all six races of the 1962 European 'one of a kind' regatta, in addition to the first International Catamaran Challenge in 1963.

== Legacy ==
Macalpine-Downie is said to have been the first to try both 'una rig' and wing masts.

His two most famous designs were the high-speed Crossbow multihulls which set sailing speed records in the 1970s and 1980s. The Crossbow proa set a speed record of 26.30 knots in 1973. Its successor, Crossbow II, set a new record in 1980 of 36.00 knots, a mark which was not surpassed till 1986.

== Death ==
Macalpine-Downie died in 1986, aged 52. A new Crossbow design was partly completed, which Macalpine-Downie believed was capable of 70+ knots.

== Designs ==
- British Oxygen - a 70 foot catamaran designed for Gerry Boxall and Robin Knox-Johnston, and in which they won the 1974 two handed Round Britain race
- Buccaneer 18 sailing dinghy
- Crossbow and Crossbow II multihulls
- Gloucester 15 sailing dinghy
- Mirrorcat catamaran
- Mutineer 15 day sailer
- Phoenix 18 catamaran
- Iroquois (Mk2 launched 1969) racer/cruiser 30’/9.3m catamaran, a very successful design with over 400 built by Sailcraft Ltd, UK
- Comanche 32 (1978) cruiser 32’/9.8m catamarans, a very successful design built by Sailcraft Ltd, UK
- Apache cruiser 41’/12.5m catamaran built by Sailcraft Ltd, UK

== See also ==
- Catamaran
- Shearwater I
- Thai Mk4
