= Trifle (disambiguation) =

Trifle is a layered dessert.

Trifle(s) may also refer to:

- Trifle (metal), a grade of pewter 84 parts of tin, 7 of antimony, and 4 parts of copper
- Trifle (trimaran) trimaran sailboat designed by Derek Kelsall and produced in 1966
- Trifles (play), one-act play by Susan Glaspell
- Trifles (1930 film), short film based on the play with Jason Robards Sr. and Sarah Padden
- a small piece of jewellery
- word meaning something of insignificance
- to treat (someone or something) without seriousness or with a lack of respect
