= Multihull =

Ship or boat with more than one hull

The relationship between monohulls & multihulls

A multihull is a boat or ship with more than one hull, whereas a vessel with a single hull is a monohull. The most common multihulls are catamarans (with two hulls), and trimarans (with three hulls). There are other types, with four or more hulls, but such examples are very rare and tend to be specialised for particular functions.

== Multihull history ==
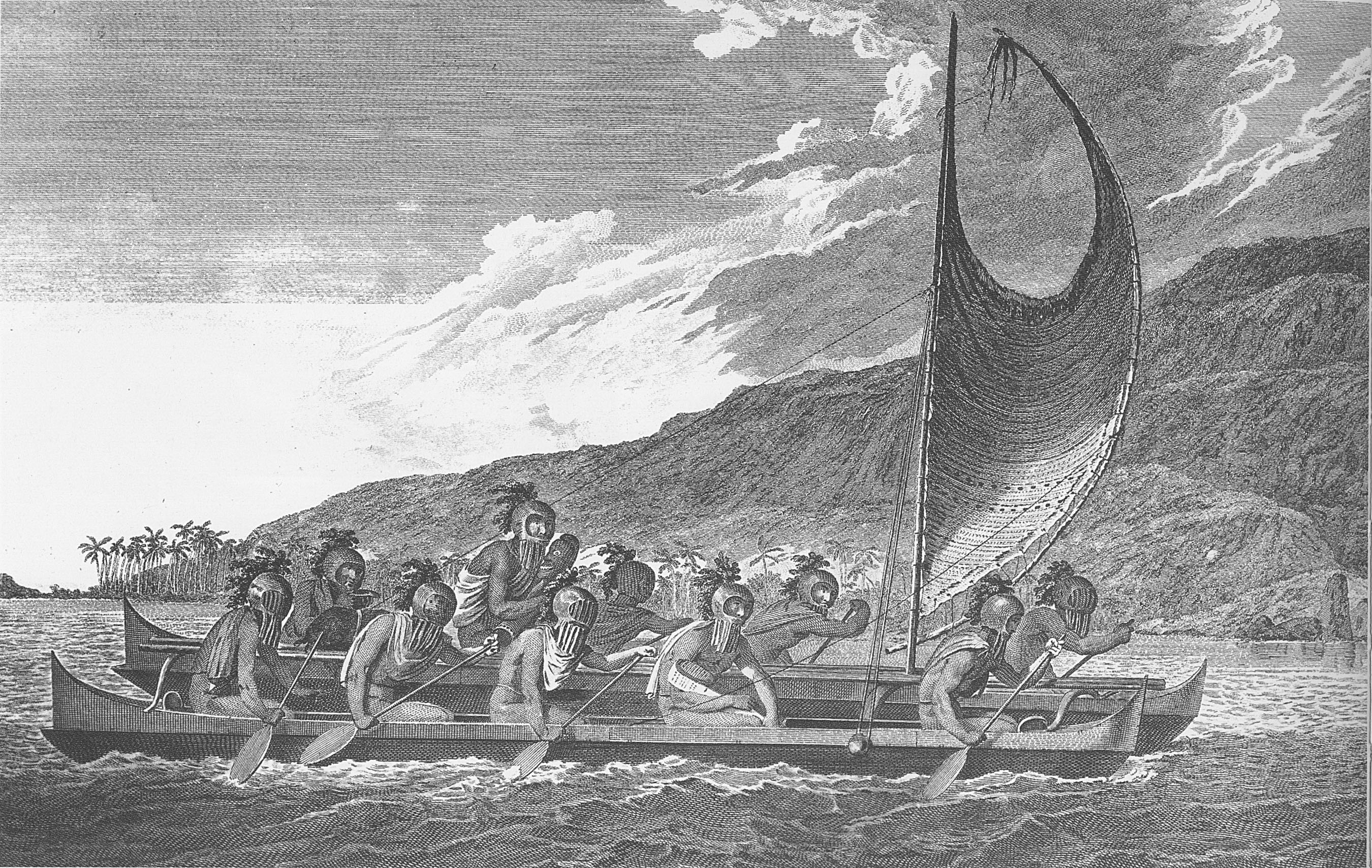
A Polynesian catamaran

Single-outrigger boats, double-canoes (catamarans), and double-outrigger boats (trimarans) of the Austronesian peoples are the direct antecedents of modern multihull vessels. They were developed during the Austronesian Expansion (c. 3000 to 1500 BC) which allowed Austronesians to colonize maritime Southeast Asia, Micronesia, Island Melanesia, Madagascar, and Polynesia. These Austronesian vessels are still widely used today by traditional fishermen in Austronesian regions in maritime Southeast Asia, Oceania and Madagascar; as well as areas they were introduced to by Austronesians in ancient times like in the East African coast and in South Asia.

Greek sources also describe large third-century BC catamarans, one built under the supervision of Archimedes, the Syracusia, and another reportedly built by Ptolemy IV Philopator of Egypt, the Tessarakonteres.

=== 20th-century origins ===
In 1916, Leonardo Torres Quevedo patented the Binave, the first modern steel multihull that introduced flexible structural joints to solve sea-induced torsion, an early contribution to the engineering of high-speed catamarans.

=== Modern developers ===
Modern pioneers of multihull design include James Wharram (UK), Derek Kelsall (UK), Tom Lack (UK), Lock Crowther (Aust), Hedly Nicol (Aust), Malcolm Tennant (NZ), Jim Brown (USA), Arthur Piver (USA), Chris White (US), Ian Farrier (NZ), LOMOcean (NZ), Darren Newton (UK), Jens Quorning (DK) and Dick Newick (USA).

== Multihull types ==
=== Single-outrigger ("proa") ===
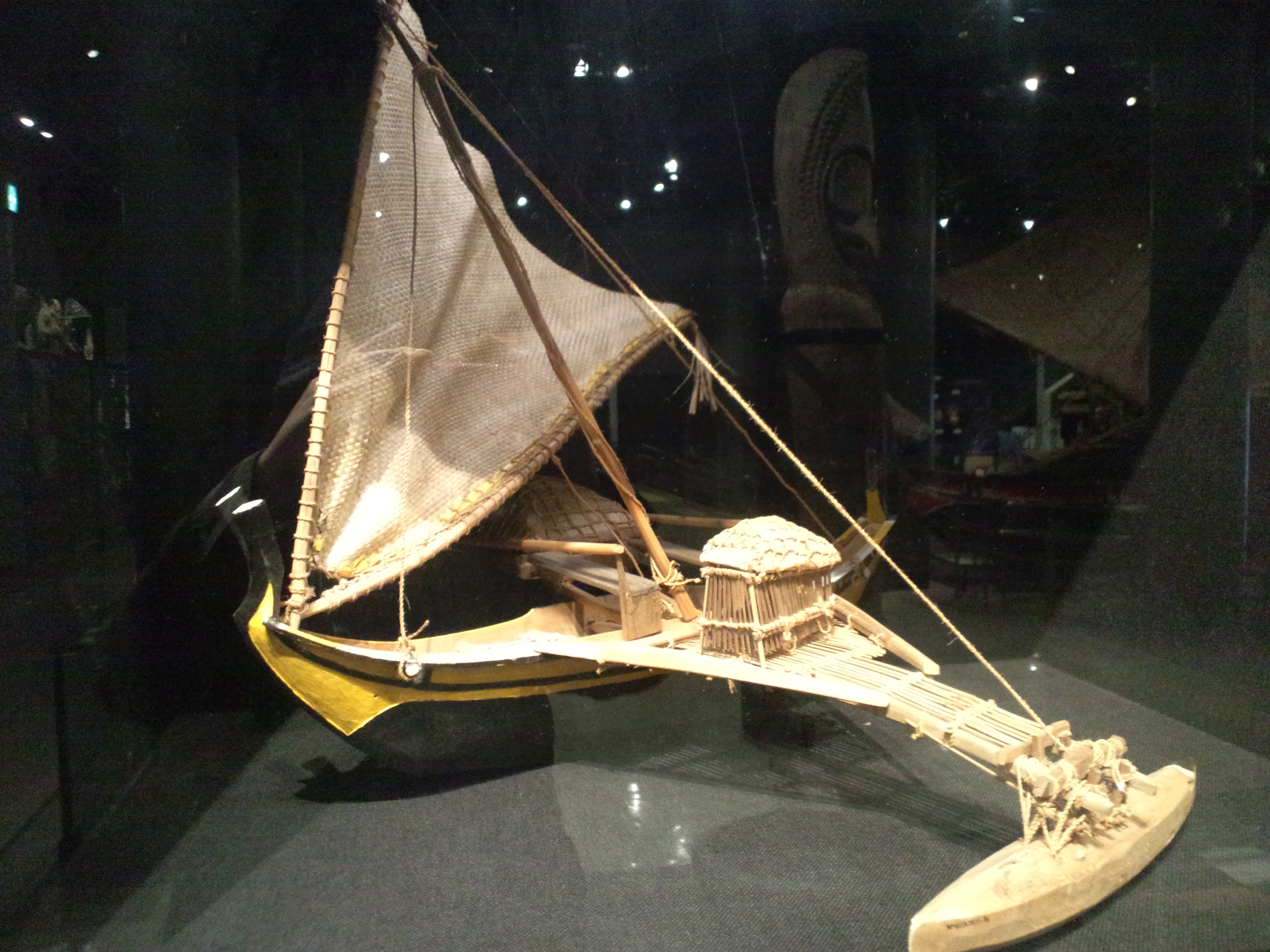
Model of a wa, a single-outrigger vessel, from Woleai in the National Museum of Ethnology (Japan)

A single-outrigger canoe is a canoe with a slender outrigger ("ama") attached by two or more struts ("akas"). This craft will normally be propelled by paddles. Single-outrigger canoes that use sails are usually inaccurately referred to by the name "proa". While single-outrigger canoes and proas both derive stability from the outrigger, the proa has the greater need of the outrigger to counter the heeling effect of the sail. The outrigger on a proa can either be on the lee or windward side, or in a tacking proa, interchangeable. However, more recently, proas tend to keep the outrigger either to leeward or to wind which means that instead of tacking, a "shunt" is required, whereby the bow becomes the stern, and the stern becomes the bow.

=== Catamaran (twin-hull) ===
A catamaran is a vessel with twin hulls. Commercial catamarans began in 17th century England. Separate attempts at steam-powered catamarans were carried out by the middle of the 20th century. However, success required better materials and more developed hydrodynamic technologies. During the second half of the 20th century catamaran designs flourished. Catamaran configurations are used for racing, sailing, tourist and fishing boats.

The hulls of a catamaran are typically connected by a bridgedeck, although some simpler cruising catamarans simply have a trampoline stretched between the crossbeams (or "akas"). Small beachable catamarans, such as the Hobie Cat, also have only a trampoline between the hulls.

Catamarans derive stability from the distance between the hulls—transverse clearance—the greater this distance, the greater the stability. Typically, catamaran hulls are slim, although they may flare above the waterline to give reserve buoyancy. The vertical clearance between the design waterplane and the bottom of the bridge deck determines the likelihood of contact with waves. Increased vertical clearance diminishes such contact and increases seaworthiness, within limits.

The twin-hull (catamaran) design is effective in enhancing the stability of very small, lightweight and narrow personal boats designed for paddling and powering with portable outboard motors.

=== Trimaran (double-outrigger) ===
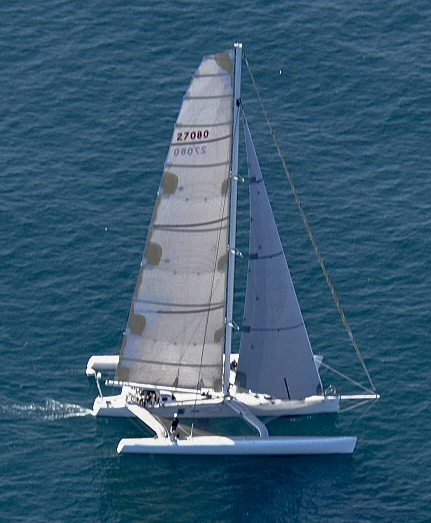
A 60' trimaran with high aspect fractional Bermuda rig

A trimaran (or double-outrigger) is a vessel with two outrigger floats attached on either side of a main hull by a crossbeam, wing, or other form of superstructure. They are derived from traditional double-outrigger vessels of maritime Southeast Asia. Despite not being traditionally Polynesian, western trimarans use traditional Polynesian terms for the hull (vaka), the floats (ama), and connectors (aka). The word trimaran is a portmanteau of tri and (cata)maran, a term that is thought to have been coined by Victor Tchetchet, a pioneering modern multihull designer, born in Ukraine (at that time part of the Russian Empire).

Some trimaran configurations use the outlying hulls to enhance stability and allow for shallow draft, examples include the experimental ship RV Triton and the Independence class of littoral combat ships (US).

=== Four and five hulls ===
Some multihulls with four (quadrimaran) or five (pentamaran) hulls have been proposed; few have been built. In 2018 a Swiss entrepreneur sought funding to build a sail-driven quadrimaran called Manta that would use solar power to scoop plastic from the ocean. Manta was still under development as of the end of 2023. A French manufacturer, Tera-4, produces motor quadrimarans which use aerodynamic lift between the four hulls to promote planing and reduce power consumption.

Design concepts for vessels with two pair of outriggers have been referred to as pentamarans. The design concept comprises a narrow, long hull that cuts through waves. The outriggers then provide the stability that such a narrow hull needs. While the aft sponsons act as trimaran sponsons do, the front sponsons do not touch the water normally; only if the ship rolls to one side do they provide added buoyancy to correct the roll. BMT Group, a shipbuilding and engineering company in the UK, has proposed a fast cargo ship and a yacht using this kind of hull.

=== SWATH multihulls ===
A narrow waterline distinguishes a SWATH ship from a conventional catamaran

Multihull designs may have hull beams that are slimmer at the water surface ("waterplane") than underwater. This arrangement allows good wave-piercing, while keeping a buoyant hydrodynamic hull beneath the waterplane. In a catamaran configuration this is called a small waterplane area twin hull, or SWATH. While SWATHs are stable in rough seas, they have the drawbacks, compared with other catamarans, of having a deeper draft, being more sensitive to loading, and requiring more power because of their higher underwater surface areas. Triple-hull configurations of small waterplane area craft had been studied, but not built, as of 2008.

== Performance ==
Each hull of a multihull vessel can be narrower than that of a monohull with the same displacement and long, narrow hulls, a multihull typically produces very small bow waves and wakes, a consequence of a favorable Froude number. Vessels with beamy hulls (typically monohulls) normally create a large bow wave and wake. Such a vessel is limited by its "hull speed", being unable to "climb over" its bow wave unless it changes from displacement mode to planing mode. Vessels with slim hulls (typically multihulls) will normally create no appreciable bow wave to limit their progress.

In 1978, 101 years after catamarans like Amaryllis were banned from yacht racing they returned to the sport. This started with the victory of the trimaran Olympus Photo, skippered by Mike Birch in the first Route du Rhum. Thereafter, no open ocean race was won by a monohull. Winning times dropped by 70%, since 1978. Olympus Photo's 23-day 6 hr 58' 35" success dropped to Gitana 11's 7d 17h 19'6", in 2006. Around 2016 the first large wind driven foil-borne racing catamarans were built. These cats rise onto foils and T-foiled rudders only at higher speeds.

== Sailing multihulls and workboats ==
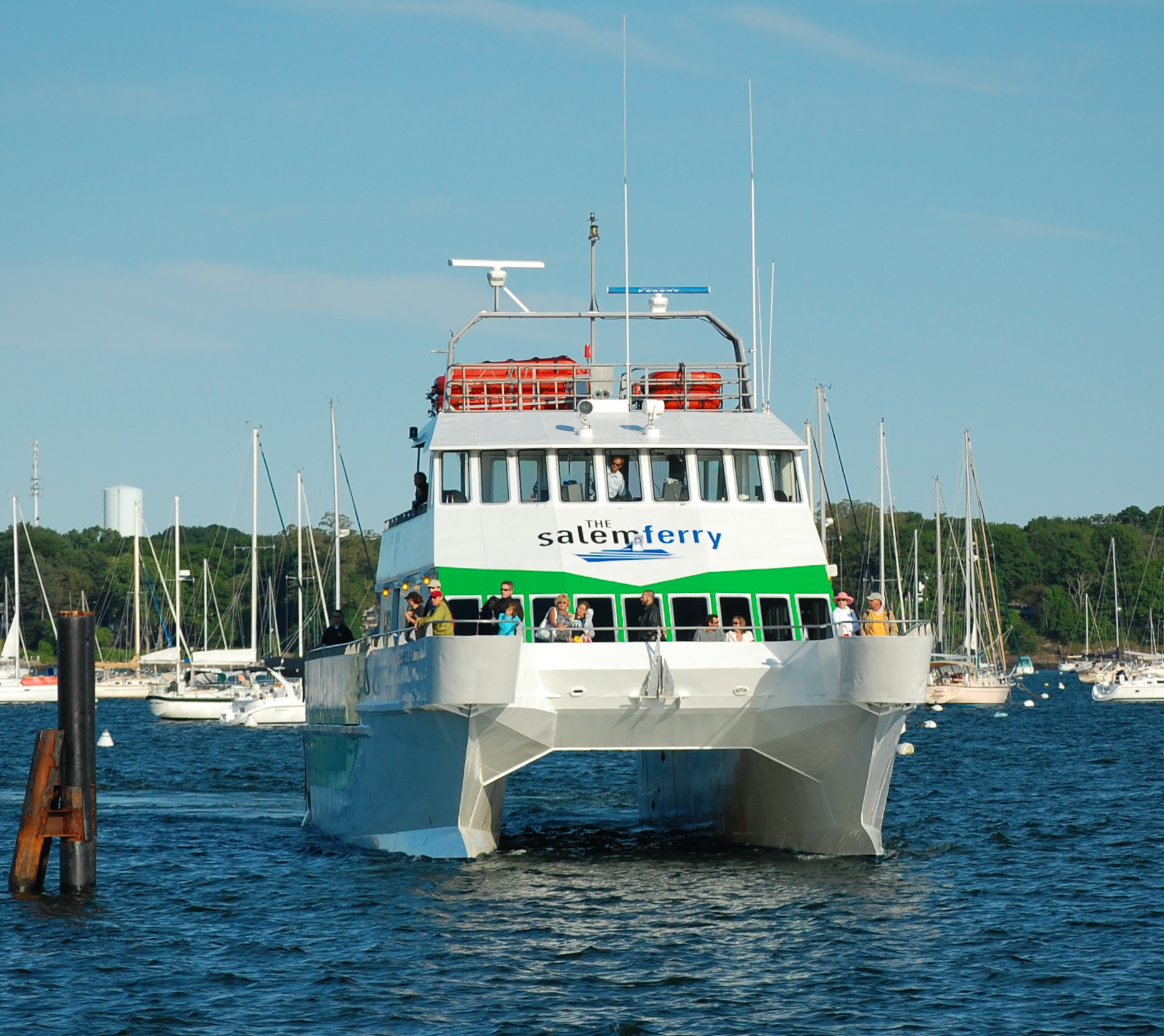
A catamaran ferry in Salem, Massachusetts

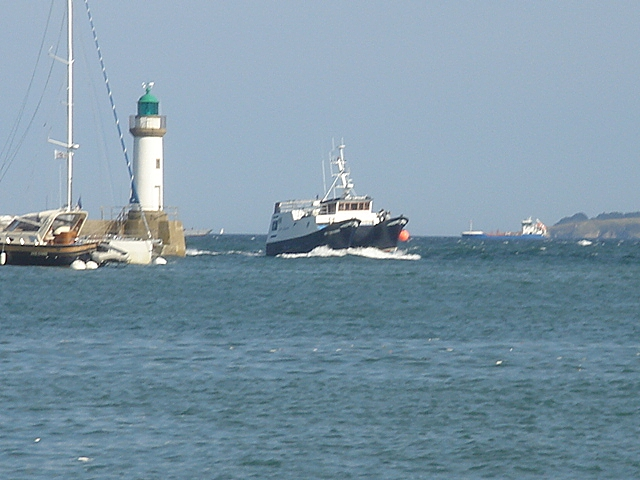
A French catamaran trawler

The increasing popularity of catamaran since the 1960s is down to the added space, speed, shallow draft, and lack of heeling underway. The stability of a multihull makes sailing much less tiring for the crew, and is particularly suitable for families. Having no need for ballast for stability, multihulls are much lighter than monohull sailboats; but a multihull's fine hull sections mean that one must take care not to overload the vessel. Powerboats catamarans are increasingly used for racing, cruising and as workboats and fishing boats. Speed, the stable working platform, safety, and added space are the prime advantages for power cats.

"The weight of a multihull, of this length, is probably not much more than half the weight of a monohull of the same length and it can be sailed with less crew effort."

Racing catamarans and trimarans are popular in France, New Zealand and Australia. Cruising cats are commonest in the Caribbean and Mediterranean (where they form the bulk of the charter business) and Australia. Multihulls are less common in the US, perhaps because their increased beam require wider dock/slips. Smaller multihulls may be collapsible and trailerable, and thus suitable for daybooks and racers. Until the 1960s most multihull sailboats (except for beach cats) were built either by their owners or by boat builders; since then companies have been selling mass-produced boats, of which there are more than 150 models.

== See also ==
- List of multihulls
- International C-Class Catamaran Championship
- International Catamaran Challenge Trophy
- Monocat
- Round Texel
- Sailing
- Turtling
- Trampoline (multihulls)

== References and Bibliography ==
- Jim Howard, Charles J. Doane (2000). Handbook of offshore cruising: The Dream and Reality of Modern Ocean Cruising. Sheridan House, Inc. p. 280. ISBN 1-57409-093-3.
- C. A. Marchaj (2000). Aero-Hydrodynamics of Sailing. Tiller Publishing. ISBN 1-888671-18-1.
- C. A. Marchaj. Sail Performance. McGraw Hill. p. 400. ISBN 0-07-141310-3.
- C. A. Marchaj. Seaworthiness:The Forgotten Factor. Tiller Publishing. p. 372. ISBN 1-888671-09-2.
- Gavin le Sueur. Multihull Seamanship. Fernhurst books. p. 148. ISBN 9781912177080.
- Harvey, Derek, Multihulls for Cruising and Racing, Adlard Coles, London 1990, ISBN 0-7136-6414-2
