= Mutineer 15 =

Sloop sailboat manufactured by Nickels Boat Works

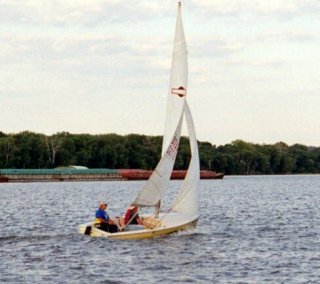
- Mutineer and barge share the Mississippi River

Development
- Designer: Rod Macalpine-Downie and Dick Gibbs
- Location: Chrysler Corporation, Marine Division
- Year: 1971
- Design: GRP

Boat
- Crew: 2
- Draft: 4 ft 1 in (1.24 m)

Hull
- Type: Monohull
- Construction: One-Design
- Hull weight: 410 lb (190 kg)
- LOA: 15 ft (4.6 m)
- LWL: 14 ft 1 in (4.29 m)
- Beam: 6 ft (1.8 m)

Hull appendages
- Keel: Centerboard

Rig
- Rig type: Fractional Sloop
- Mast height: 21 ft 8 in (6.60 m)

Sails
- Mainsail area: 100 sq ft (9.3 m^{2})
- Jib/genoa area: 50 sq ft (4.6 m^{2})
- Spinnaker area: 166 sq ft (15.4 m^{2})
- Upwind sail area: 150 sq ft (14 m^{2})

The Mutineer 15 is a 15-foot (4.6 m) long fractional sloop sailboat currently manufactured by Nickels Boat Works. It has a dinghy centerboard hull, no ballast, and displaces 410 pounds. The Mutineer 15 has a 6-foot (1.8 m) beam, maximum draw of 4.08 feet (1.24 m), and has 150 square feet (14 m^{2}) of sail area. The Mutineer 15 is commonly used for both day sailing and class racing. The Mutineer 15 can be comfortably sailed as a day sailer with a crew of four, but can also be raced with a crew of two, or even single-handed by semi-experienced to experienced sailors.

In 1968 boat designers Rod Macalpine-Downie and Dick Gibbs designed the Buccaneer 18. It was a popular sailboat design, but it led to a demand for a lighter, more affordable boat. Three years later, in 1971, Macalpine-Downie and Gibbs finished the design on the Mutineer 15. The Mutineer and Buccaneer are very similar in basic design, and include many of the same features. At the time it was designed, the Mutineer had several innovative features, including the roller furling jib, spinnaker rigging, and a foredeck launcher tube.

The Mutineer 15 had a series of manufacturers over the years. It was originally designed and manufactured as part of the Marine branch of the Chrysler corporation. When the Chrysler corporation restructured as part of a financial crisis in the 1970s, it sold the rights to the boat to Texas Marine International. In rapid succession, the Mutineer was then manufactured by Wellcraft Marine, Gloucester Yachts, and Cardinal Yachts. In 2003 Cardinal Yachts sold the boat rights to Nickels Boat Works, who modified the design slightly. Nickels Boat Works is the current manufacturer of the Mutineer 15.

== History ==
The Mutineer 15 has gone through a series of company changes since its introduction in 1971. It was designed and first produced by the Marine division of Chrysler. The original design was developed by boat designers, Rod Macalpine-Downie and Dick Gibbs, who had previously worked on the Buccaneer 18. Several innovative features were included in their design, making the Mutineer 15 suitable for both racing and cruising applications. Some of these features included a roller furling jib, spinnaker rigging, a foredeck launcher tube, hiking straps, and a hiking stick. who included several innovative features in their design.

=== 1971–1980 ===
Between the boat's release in 1971 until 1980, Chrysler built over 6000 Mutineer 15s. Due to a financial crisis, however, Chrysler was forced to turn to the government for loans. The government stipulated that as part of the loan guarantees Chrysler was required to sell the marine division of its company. In 1980, Chrysler Boat, which included the rights to the Mutineer 15, was sold to Texas Marine International.

=== 1980–1984 ===
Texas Marine International was founded by former Chrysler Corporation executives. Texas Marine manufactured the boats from 1981 to 1982 but it soon failed financially as well. In 1982 another company, Wellcraft Marine, purchases the rights to the Mutineer 15 from Texas Marine and began manufacturing them under a different name, Starwind 15. Wellcraft Marine built Mutineer 15 (sold under the name Starwind 15) for two years from 1982 until 1984.

=== 1985–2003 ===
In 1985 Gloucester Yachts purchased the rights to the Mutineer 15. The company built approximately 40 of the boats before selling them to Cardinal Yachts in 1986. The rights to the Mutineer 15 were held by Cardinal Yachts until 2003 when Nickels Boat Works purchased the molds.

=== 2003–Present ===
In the winter between 2007 and 2008 Nickels Boat Works completely revamped the molds in addition to making modifications to the boat itself, particularly in the cockpit and deck. While the hull design stayed the same, these changes constituted the third round of significant improvements to the boat's deck and cockpit design since it was first sold on the market in 1971. For a photo documentation of the changes over time, see: http://mutineer15.org/mutineer-timeline.html The Mutineer 15 is still in production today.

=== Owners ===
In total, the Mutineer 15 has had six different owners between 1971 and today.

1. Chrysler (1971–1980)
2. Texas Marin International (1981–1982)
3. Wellcraft Marine (1982–1984)
4. Gloucester Yachts (1985–1986)
5. Cardinal Yachts (1986–2003)
6. Nickels Boat Works (2003–Present)

== Specifications ==
The Mutineer 15 is a sloop with a fractional rig. It is 15 feet (4.6 m) long from bow to stern (LOA) and the Waterline length (LWL) of the boat is 14 feet (4.3 m), 1 inch. The primary construction material for the Mutt is fiberglass, with molded-in and textured cockpit seats and skid-resistant deck and flooring.

The cockpit itself is 7 feet (2.1 m) long. Standard racing crew on the Mutt is two, but for day sailing the Mutt has a maximum capacity of 4 people or 750 pounds. The Mutt can also be rigged for single-handing for those with enough experience. On the original Chrysler boats, the deck was white with a green or yellow hull. Ronstan and Harken hardware comes standard on Nickels Mutineers. The Mutineer 15 is equipped with a cunningham, boomvang, and jib uphaul system. Depending on the model there is either foam flotation (older) or fully sealed air tanks (Nickels Mutineers) to provide additional flotation.

The boat has a centerboard that can be raised and lowered according to varying conditions and for ease of transport. When the centerboard is fully extended, the Mutineer 15 will draw a maximum of 4 feet 1 inch (1.24 m) When the centerboard is raised the boat will draw a maximum of 8 inches. The boat displaces a total of 410 pounds.

The mast is 21 feet 8 inches (6.60 m) tall. The total upwind sail area for the Mutt is 150 square feet (14 m^{2}). The main sail is 100 square feet (9.3 m^{2}), and the jib is 50 square feet (4.6 m^{2}) maximum. The Mutineer can also be rigged for a spinnaker. All Mutineers built since 2008 come rigged for a spinnaker from the factory. Sail area for the spinnaker is 166 square feet (15.4 m^{2}) maximum.

The Mutt comes standard with a 3.8 oz minimum Dacron jib. A Mylar jib is also allowed. The standard main is also minimum 3.8 oz Dacron with 4 battens. The Mutt can also be rigged for a spinnaker. The jib can be reefed from the cockpit; the main has mid-boom sheeting. The jib is roller furling and the bow is equipped with a spinnaker launcher. Neil Pryde is the current provider of the standard sails for Nickels Mutineers, although they offer upgrades to North, Quantum, Schurr, and Vermont Sailing Partners sails.

== Mutineer versus Buccaneer ==
The Buccaneer 18 was designed in 1968 by Rod Macalpine-Downie and Dick Gibbs under the marine division of the Chrysler corporation. The boat was very popular, but it also created a demand for a smaller, lighter, and more affordable version of the 18-foot (5.5 m) boat. This led Macalpine-Downie and Gibbs to create another, smaller version of the Buccaneer: the Mutineer.

There are several major differences between the Mutineer and Buccaneer. The Buccaneer is 18 feet (5.5 m) long, making it 3 feet (0.91 m) longer than the Mutineer. Despite being a shorter boat, the beam of the Mutineer is comparable to that of the Buccaneer, making the boat more comfortable and stable for its size. Additionally, the Buccaneer is almost 100 pounds heavier than the Mutineer, and has a larger and higher sail plan (175 sq ft versus 150 sq ft). In general, the Mutineer is better suited for a cross-over between recreational sailing and racing. The Mutineer is a slightly slower boat than the Buccaneer in lighter winds, but is faster and easier to handle in medium and heavier winds as the Buccaneer becomes overpowered.

Due to their shared history, however, there are remarkable similarities as well. The boat designs are so similar that many parts (mast, boom, tiller, shrouds, running lines) are different only in their length. The rigging hardware, centerboard, and rudder are the same on both boats, and the sails are scaled versions of each other. It is sometimes possible to substitute Mutt parts for Bucc parts, and vice versa. Finally, throughout many company changes, the Mutineer and Buccaneer have always been sold together and today both are manufactured by Nickels Boat Works

== Class Racing ==
The Mutineer Class Association (MCA) has been actively working to recruit more members and increase racing. They have held Mutineer Nationals since 2002, and participation in nationals has increased every year since. The MCA also helps to organize other regattas. In order to participate in these regattas, you must be a member of the MCA.

Currently there are 3 active Mutineer 15 fleets in the continental United States. The first was fleet 34 in Alabama. In 2010, 3 other fleets became active: Fleet 2 in Texas and Fleet 18 in Florida. Two other fleets are organizing with the intention of activating: Fleet 6 in Michigan and Fleet 1 in the Mid-Atlantic.

== See also ==
- Gloucester 15
