= Round Texel =

Catamaran race in the Netherlands

Round Texel (Dutch: Ronde om Texel) is the biggest catamaran race in the world, with an annual average of 600 participants.

The Ronde om Texel is a regatta for catamarans around the island of Texel in The Netherlands. Round Texel was first organized in 1978. In that year, Sigi Lach (from Germany) won in a Hobie 14 in a field of 84 participants. Since then the race grown into the biggest catamaran race in the world with an annual average of 600 cats participating. The race has its start and finish near Paal 17 on the North Sea and is approximately 100 kilometres (62 mi) long. It is organized once a year on a Saturday in June. The race starts an hour before high tide to ensure that there is enough water to pass the high mud flats northeast of the island. This tidal prerequisite determines the date that is chosen each year for the event.

Strong tidal currents and variable winds around the island makes Round Texel a highly tactical race that has been won alternately by professional sportsmen and skilled outsiders. Notable winners have been Reginald White, the first multihull Olympic champion, who won Round Texel in 1994 at the age of 59. In 2003, the trophy went to Darren Bundock and Glen Ashby, world champion in several multihull classes in 2003, 2004 and 2005. The 30th anniversary race on June 23, 2007, was won by Darren Bundock and Glenn Ashby from Australia in a F18 Hobie Tiger. Line honours were won in 2007 and 2008 by Xander Pols and Tjiddo Veenstra. In 2009, they took a second place in the line honours ranking.

The helm Carolijn Brouwer and her crew Wouter Samama made history after becoming the first female helmsman to win. This was also the first edition, which was held on Sunday (as a result of heavy winds' om Saturday).
