= Callixenus of Rhodes =

Hellenistic author from Rhodes

Callixenus of Rhodes (Ancient Greek: Καλλίξενος or Καλλίξεινος ὁ Ῥόδιος) was a Hellenistic author from Rhodes. He was a contemporary of Ptolemy II Philadelphus, Ptolemy III Euergetes and Ptolemy IV Philopator. He wrote two works, both of which are lost.

== Works ==
- Peri Alexandreias - A work consisting of four books, and referenced much by Athenaeus It contained the main account of the Tessarakonteres.
- An untitled catalogue of painters and sculptors (Zografon te kai andriantopoion anagrafe), of which Sopater, in the twelfth book of his Eclogae had made an abridgement.

== Bibliography ==
- Keyser, Paul T. (2014). "Kallixeinos of Rhodes (627)". In Ian Worthington (ed.). Brill's New Jacoby. Brill Online.
