= Mirrorcat =

Mirrorcat was a 1960s 40 ft (12 m) ocean-going catamaran sailboat designed by Rod Macalpine-Downie. The vessel took part in the 1967 Crystal Trophy race in the English Channel, and the first Round Britain and Ireland Race. At the time, it was considered one of the fastest ocean-going multihulls in the world.

== See also ==
- List of multihulls
- Trifle (trimaran)
