= Syracusia =

Ancient Greek ship

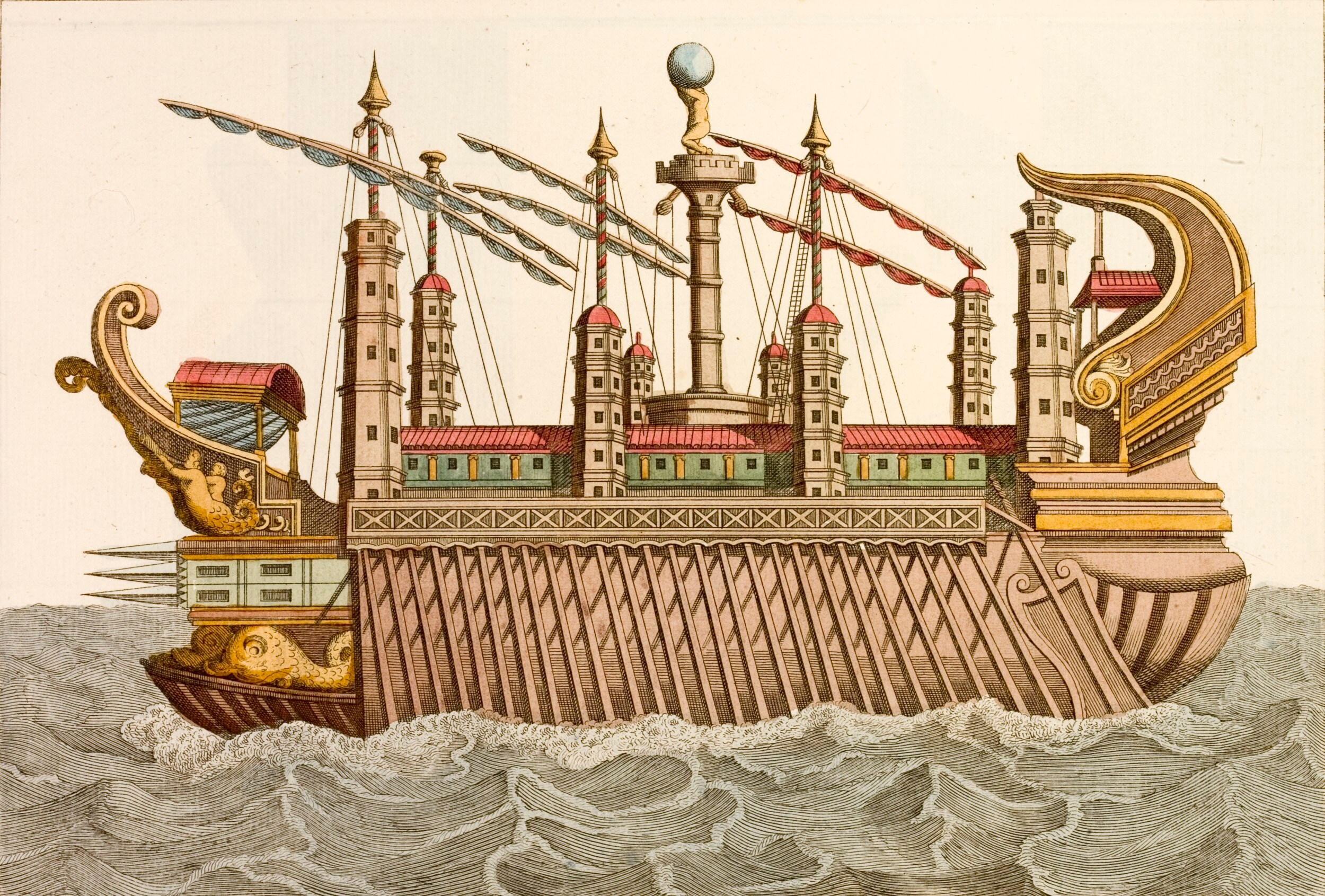
Syracusia as imagined in 1671.

Syracusia (Greek: Συρακουσία, syrakousía, literally "of Syracuse") was an ancient Greek ship sometimes claimed to be the largest transport ship of antiquity. She was reportedly too big for any port in Sicily, and thus only sailed once from Syracuse in Sicily to Alexandria in the Ptolemaic Kingdom of Egypt, whereupon she was given as a present to Ptolemy III Euergetes. The exact dimension of Syracusia is unknown; Historian Michael Lahanas put it at 55 metres (180 ft) long, 14 m wide, and 13 m high.

== General characteristics ==
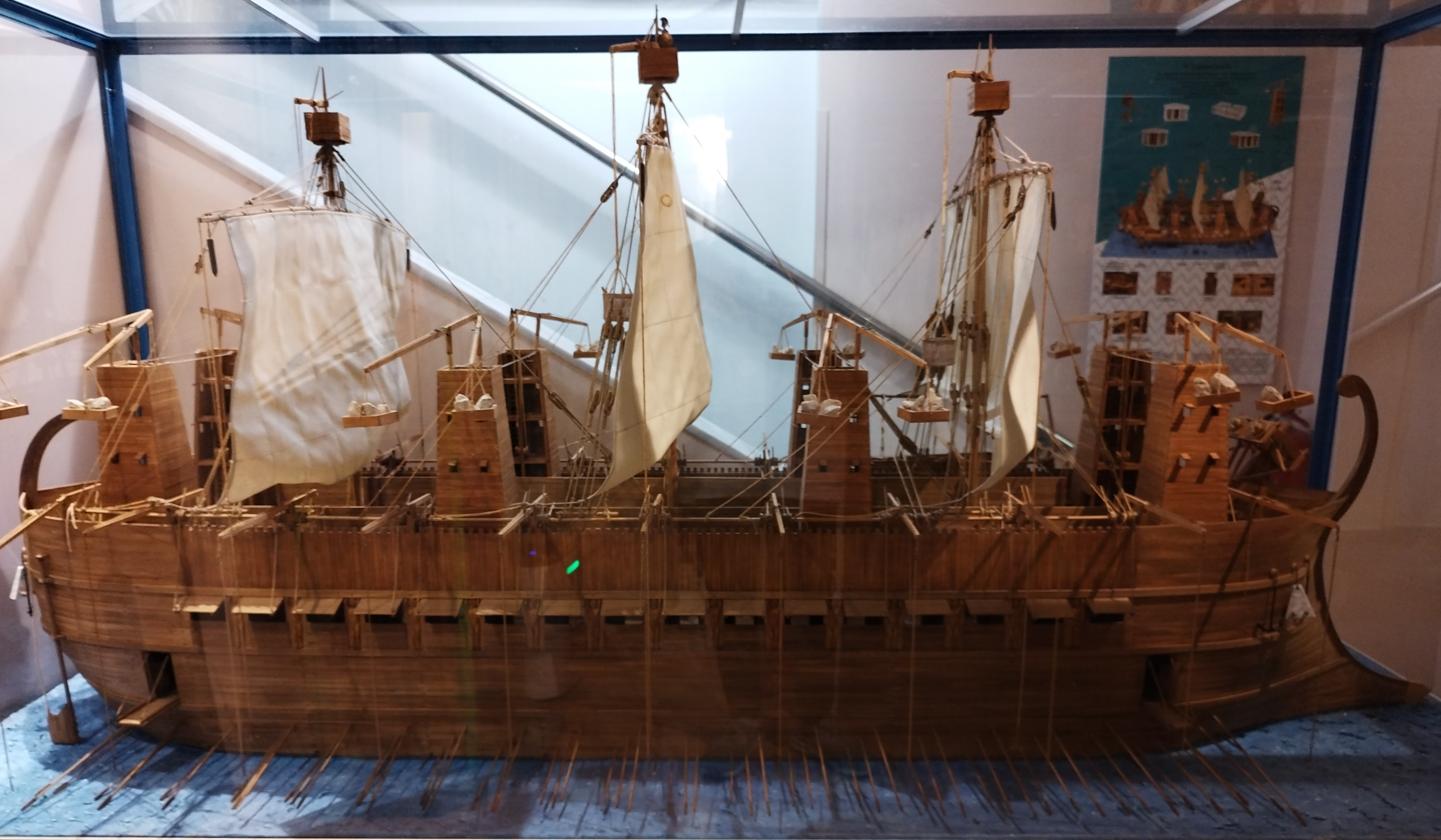
A miniature replica of Syracusia by Kotsanas Museum of Ancient Greek Technology in Athens, Greece.

Syracusia was designed by Archimedes and built around 240 BC by Archias of Corinth on the orders of Hieron II of Syracuse. The historian Moschion of Phaselis said that Syracusia could carry a cargo of some 1600 to 1800 tons and a capacity of 1,942 passengers. She reputedly bore more than 200 soldiers, as well as a catapult. She sailed only once to berth in Alexandria, where she was later given to Ptolemy (Ptolemaios) III Euergetes of Egypt and renamed Alexandreia (Greek: Αλεξάνδρεια, literally "of Alexandria").

A discussion of this ship, as well as the complete text of Athenaeus (a late 2nd-century Greek writer who quotes a detailed description of Syracusia from Moschion, an earlier, now lost, writer) is in Casson's Ships and Seamanship in the Ancient World.

Of particular interest in the discussion of the construction of the ship is the detailed description of the efforts taken to protect the hull from biofouling, including coating it with horsehair and pitch. This may be the first example of proactive antifouling technology (designed to prevent the attachment of fouling organisms, rather than to remove them).

== Appearance ==
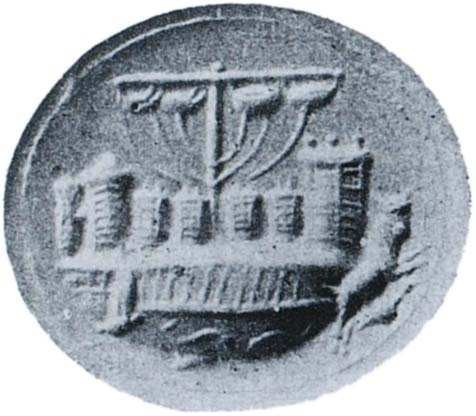
A ship associated with Syracusia, c. 1st century BC – 1st century AD

Not much is known about the outside appearance of the ship, but Athenaeus describes that the top deck, which was wider than the rest of the ship, was supported by beautifully crafted wooden Atlases instead of simply wooden columns. Additionally, the top deck featured eight towers, equipped with two archers and four fully armed men. On the bow of the ship was a raised platform for fighting, on top of which was a giant catapult. 20 rows of oars would also have been visible from the outside, and possibly a promenade lined with flowers and tents for use by the passengers.

=== Amenities ===
In terms of passenger comfort, Syracusia would be the equivalent of Titanic compared to other ships of the era. Her innovative design and sheer size allowed for the creation of various recreational spaces aboard, including a garden and an indoor Greek bath with hot water. The lower levels of the ship were reserved for the crew and the soldiers on board, while the upper levels were for the use of passengers. According to Athenaeus, the ship was beautifully decorated using materials such as ivory and marble, while all public spaces were floored with mosaics depicting the entire story of the Iliad. The ship was also equipped with a library, a drawing room and a gymnasium for use by the passengers, as well as a small temple dedicated to Aphrodite.

== Legacy ==
The eventual fate of Syracusia is unknown. Ptolemy's son sought to outdo Syracusia. He ordered the construction of a huge warship, the Tessarakonteres: 420 feet long, and bearing more than 4,000 oarsmen and 2,850 soldiers. However, according to Plutarch, it was almost immobile. British classical scholar Armand D'Angour has argued that the construction of the Syracusia by Archimedes at the behest of Hieron II underlies the story told by Vitruvius that Hieron asked Archimedes to assess the metal content of a fabricated gold crown, leading to the latter's discovery of the buoyancy principle associated with his name.

== See also ==
- Baochuan
- Caligula's Giant Ship
- Isis
- Jong
- Nemi ships
- List of world's largest wooden ships
- Timeline of largest passenger ships
- Early and simple domes
