= Hellenistic-era warships =

Oared warships

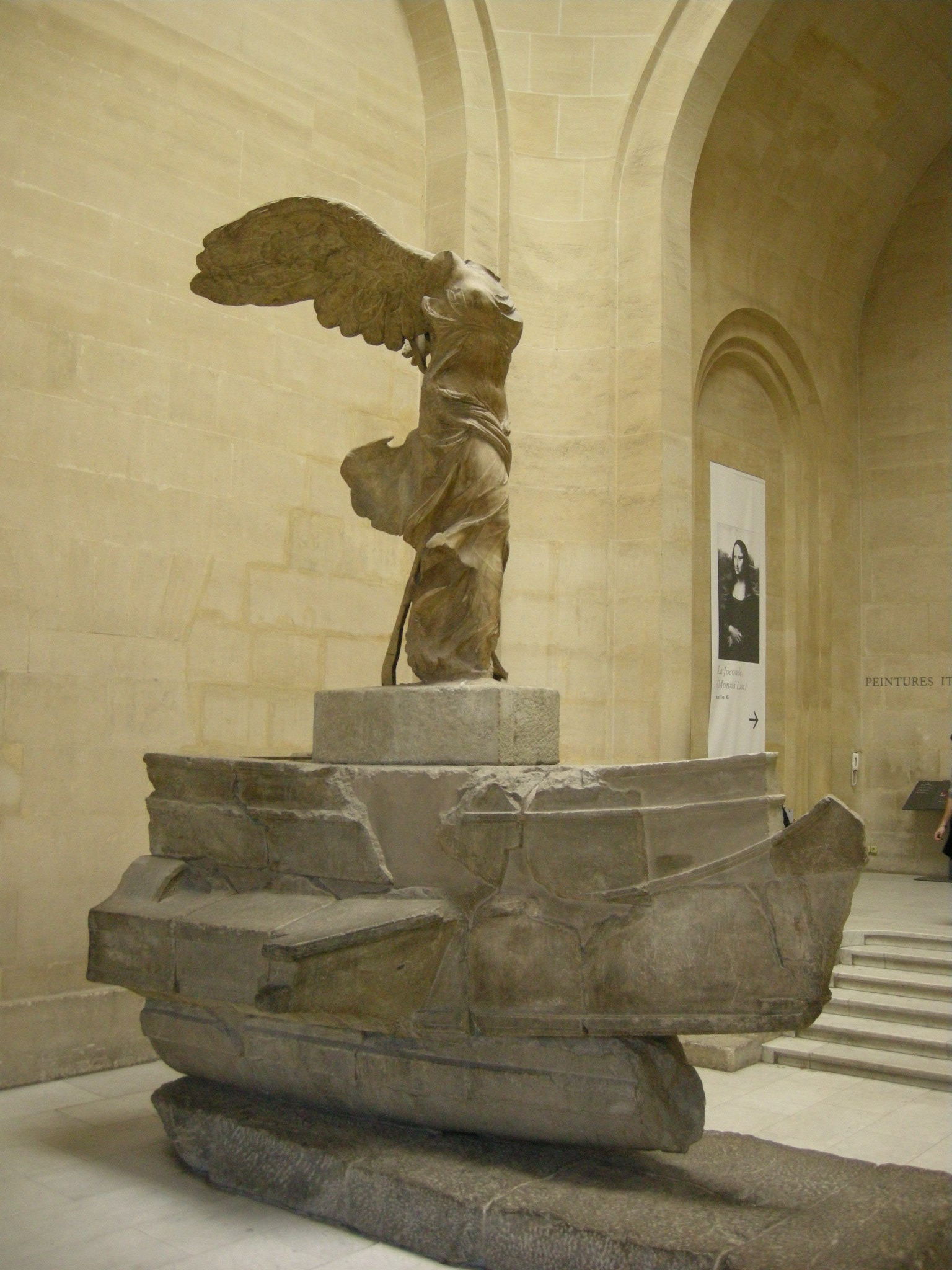
The famous 2nd century BC Nike of Samothrace, standing atop the prow of an oared warship, most probably a trihemiolia.

From the 4th century BC on, new types of oared warships appeared in the Mediterranean Sea, superseding the trireme and transforming naval warfare. Ships became increasingly large and heavy, including some of the largest wooden ships hitherto constructed. These developments were spearheaded in the Hellenistic Near East, but also to a large extent shared by the naval powers of the Western Mediterranean, specifically Carthage and the Roman Republic. While the wealthy successor kingdoms in the East built huge warships ("polyremes"), Carthage and Rome, in the intense naval antagonism during the Punic Wars, relied mostly on medium-sized vessels. At the same time, smaller naval powers employed an array of small and fast craft, which were also used by the ubiquitous pirates. Following the establishment of complete Roman hegemony in the Mediterranean after the Battle of Actium, the nascent Roman Empire faced no major naval threats. In the 1st century AD, the larger warships were retained only as flagships and were gradually supplanted by the light liburnians until, by Late Antiquity, the knowledge of their construction had been lost.

== Terminology ==
Most of the warships of the era were distinguished by their names, which were compounds of a number and a suffix. Thus the English term quinquereme derives from Latin quīnquerēmis and has the Greek equivalent πεντήρης (pentḗrēs). Both are compounds featuring a prefix meaning "five": Latin quīnque, ancient Greek πέντε (pénte). The Roman suffix is from rēmus, "oar": hence "five-oar". As the vessel cannot have had only five oars, the word must be a figure of speech meaning something else. There are a number of possibilities. The -ηρης occurs only in suffix form, deriving from ἐρέσσω (eréssō), "(I) row". As "rower" is ἐρέτης (erétēs) and "oar" is ἐρετμόν (eretmón), -ērēs does not mean either of those but, being based on the verb, must mean "rowing". This meaning is no clearer than the Latin. Whatever the "five-oar" or the "five-row" originally meant was lost with knowledge of the construction, and is, from the 5th century on, a hotly debated issue. For the history of the interpretation efforts and current scholarly consensus, see below.

== Evolution of design ==
In the great wars of the 5th century BC, such as the Persian Wars and the Peloponnesian War, the trireme was the heaviest type of warship used by the Mediterranean navies. The trireme (Greek: τρῐήρης (triḗrēs), "three-oared") was propelled by three banks of oars, with one oarsman each. During the early 4th century BC, however, variants of the trireme design began to appear: invention of the quinquereme (Gk.: πεντήρης (pentḗrēs), "five-oared") and the hexareme (Gk. hexērēs, "six-oared") is credited by the historian Diodorus Siculus to the tyrant Dionysius I of Syracuse, while the quadrireme (Gk. tetrērēs, "four-oared") was credited by Aristotle to the Carthaginians.

=== Oar system ===
Depiction of the position of the rowers in three different levels (from top: thranitai, zygitai and thalamitai) in a Greek trireme.

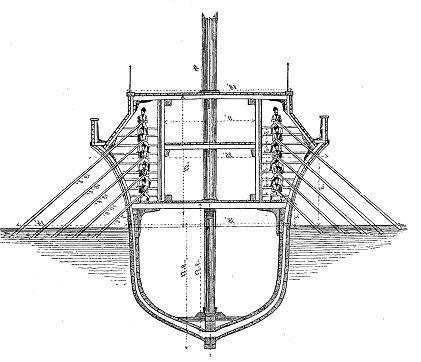
19th-century interpretation of the quinquereme's oaring system, with five levels of oars.

Far less is known with certainty about the construction and appearance of these ships than about the trireme. Literary evidence is fragmentary and highly selective, and pictorial evidence unclear. The fact that the trireme had three levels of oars (trikrotos naus) led medieval historians, long after the specifics of their construction had been lost, to speculate that the design of the "four", the "five" and the other later ships would proceed logically, i.e. that the quadrireme would have four rows of oars, the quinquereme five, etc. However, the eventual appearance of bigger polyremes ("sixes" and later "sevens", "eights", "nines", "tens", and even a massive "forty"), made this theory implausible. Consequently, during the Renaissance and until the 19th century, it came to be believed that the rowing system of the trireme and its descendants was similar to the alla sensile system of the contemporary galleys, comprising multiple oars on each level, rowed by one oarsman each. 20th-century scholarship disproved that theory, and established that the ancient warships were rowed at different levels, with three providing the maximum practical limit. The higher numbers of the "fours", "fives", etc. were therefore interpreted as reflecting the number of files of oarsmen on each side of the ship, and not an increased number of rows of oars.

The most common theory on the arrangement of oarsmen in the new ship types is that of "double-banking", i.e., that the quadrireme was derived from a bireme (warship with two rows of oars) by placing two oarsmen on each oar, the quinquereme from a trireme by placing two oarsmen on the two uppermost levels (the thranitai and zygitai, according to Greek terminology), and the later hexareme by placing two rowers on every level. Other interpretations of the quinquereme include a bireme warship with three and two oarsmen on the upper and lower oar banks, or even a monoreme (warship with a single level of oars) with five oarsmen. The "double-banking" theory is supported by the fact that the 4th-century quinqueremes were housed in the same ship sheds as the triremes, and must therefore have had similar width (c. 16 feet (4.9 m)), which fits with the idea of an evolutionary progression from the one type to the other.

The reasons for the evolution of the polyremes are not very clear. The most often forwarded argument is one of lack of skilled manpower: the trireme was essentially a ship built for ramming, and successful ramming tactics depended chiefly on the constant maintenance of a highly trained oar crew, something which few states aside from Athens with its radical democracy had the funds or the social structure to do. Using multiple oarsmen reduced the number of such highly trained men needed in each crew: only the rower at the tip of the oar had to be sufficiently trained, and he could then lead the others, who simply provided additional motive power. This system was also in use in Renaissance galleys, but jars with the evidence of ancient crews continuing to be thoroughly trained by their commanders. The increased number of oarsmen also required a broader hull, which on the one hand reduced the ships' speed, but on the other offered several advantages: larger vessels could be strengthened to better withstand ramming, while the wider hull increased their carrying capacity, allowing more marines, and eventually catapults, to be carried along. The decks of these ships were also higher above the waterline, while their increased beam afforded them extra stability, making them superior missile platforms. This was an important fact in an age where naval engagements were increasingly decided not by ramming but by less technically demanding boarding actions. It has even been suggested by Lionel Casson that the quinqueremes used by the Romans in the Punic Wars of the 3rd century were of the monoreme design (i.e., with one level and five rowers on each oar), being thus able to carry the large contingent of 120 marines attested for the Battle of Ecnomus.

An evolution to larger ships was also desirable because they were better able to survive a bow-on-bow ramming engagement, which allowed for increased tactical flexibility over the older, smaller ships which were limited to broad-side ramming. Once bigger ships had become common, they proved their usefulness in siege operations against coastal cities, such as the siege of Tyre by Alexander the Great, as well as numerous siege operations carried out by his successors, such as the siege of Rhodes by Demetrius Poliorcetes.

=== Construction ===
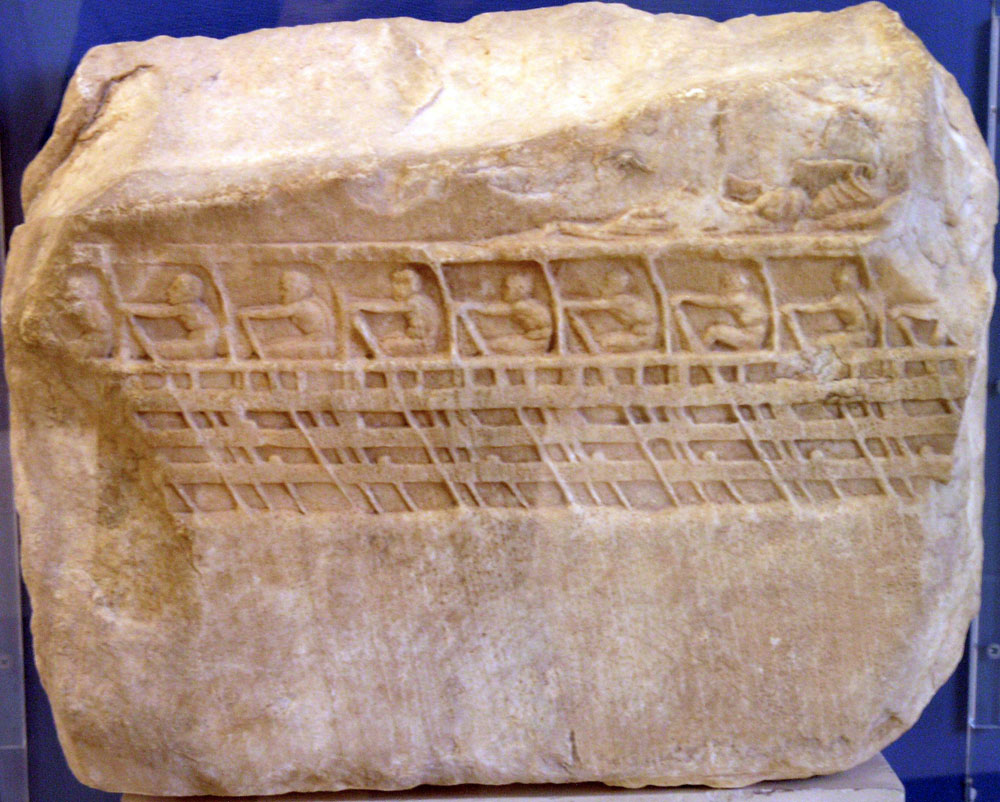
The Lenormant Relief, from the Athenian Acropolis, depicting the rowers of an "aphract" Athenian trireme, c. 410 BC. Found in 1852, it is one of the main pictorial testaments to the layout of the trireme.

There were two chief design traditions in the Mediterranean, the Greek and the Punic (Phoenician/Carthaginian) one, which was later copied by the Romans. As exemplified in the trireme, the Greeks used to project the upper level of oars through an outrigger (parexeiresia), while the later Punic tradition heightened the ship, and had all three tiers of oars projecting directly from the side hull.

Based on iconographic evidence from coins, Morrison and Coates have determined that the Punic triremes in the 5th and early 4th centuries BC were largely similar to their Greek counterparts, most likely including an outrigger. From the mid-4th century, however, at about the time the quinquereme was introduced in Phoenicia, there is evidence of ships without outriggers. This would have necessitated a different oar arrangement, with the middle level placed more inwards, as well as a different construction of the hull, with side-decks attached to it. From the middle of the 3rd century BC onwards, Carthaginian "fives" display a separate "oar box" that contained the rowers and that was attached to the main hull. This development of the earlier model entailed further modifications, meaning that the rowers would be located above deck, and essentially on the same level. This would allow the hull to be strengthened, and have increased carrying capacity in consumable supplies, as well as improve the ventilation conditions of the rowers, an especially important factor in maintaining their stamina, and thereby improving the ship's maintainable speed. It is unclear however whether this design was applied to heavier warships, and although the Romans copied the Punic model for their quinqueremes, there is ample iconographic evidence of outrigger-equipped warships used until the late imperial period.

In the Athenian Sicilian Expedition of 415–413 BC, it became apparent that the topmost tier of rowers, the thranitai, of the "aphract" (un-decked and unarmoured) Athenian triremes were vulnerable to attack by arrows and catapults. Given the prominence of close-quarters boarding actions in later years, vessels were built as "cataphract" ships, with a closed hull to protect the rowers, and a full deck able to carry marines and catapults.

=== Rigging ===
Ships could feature one to two masts, the secondary mast being called dolon or artemon in Greek. Three-masted ships came into use at the mid-1st century AD, although they remained less usual. Masts could be taken down during battle. Around this time, topsails also came to use, while lateens or triangle sails were introduced the following century. Sails were generally made of linen, papyrus or other fibers, sometimes in the same sail, while the edges were bound with leather. The sails were often coloured, with black meaning mourning, while purple or vermilion marked the ship of an admiral or a royal. Sometimes only the topsail was coloured while the sail below was plain. For scout ships, sometimes sails and ropes were dyed saltwater blue in order to make them harder to spot. Roman emperors would sometimes sport their title and emblems woven on the sails in gold. Flagships might feature a flag by day and a distinctive set lights. Flags, both to mark allegiance and to use for signalling, were used since ancient times.

== Heavy warships ==
=== Quadrireme ===
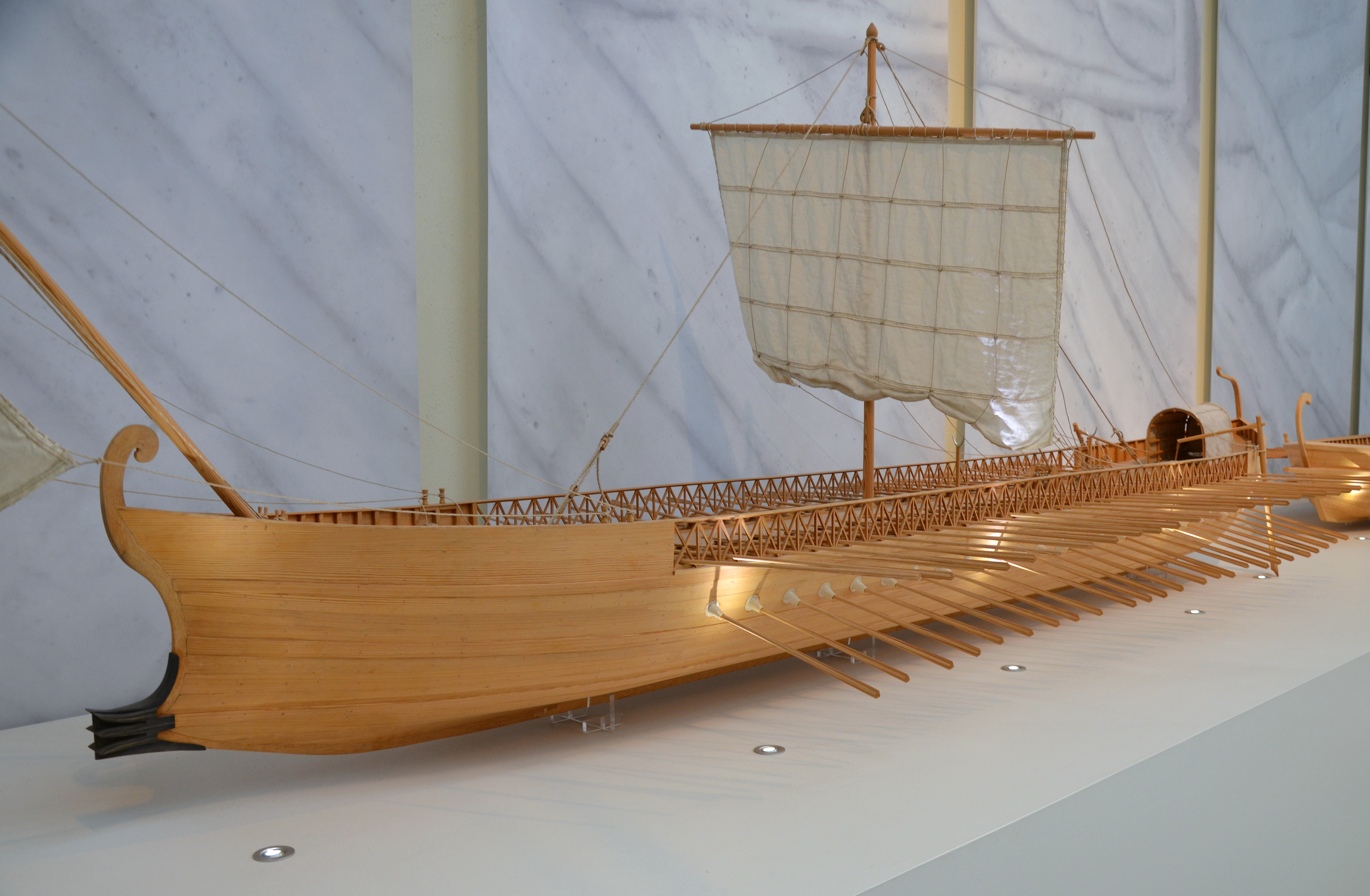
1:10 scale model reconstruction of a quadrireme based on a graffito from Alba Fucens in Italy, mid-1st century AD, Museum für Antike Schiffahrt, Mainz

Pliny the Elder reports that Aristotle ascribed the invention of the quadrireme (Latin: quadriremis; Ancient Greek: τετρήρης, tetrērēs) to the Carthaginians. Although the exact date is unknown, it is most likely the type was developed in the latter half of the 4th century BC. Their first attested appearance is at the Siege of Tyre by Alexander the Great in 332 BC, and a few years later, they appear in the surviving naval lists of Athens. In the period after Alexander's death (323 BC), the quadrireme proved very popular: the Athenians made plans to build 200 of these ships, and 90 out of 240 ships of the fleet of Antigonus I Monophthalmus (r. 306–301 BC) were "fours". Subsequently, the quadrireme was favoured as the main warship of the Rhodian navy, the sole professional naval force in the Eastern Mediterranean. In the Battle of Naulochus in 36 BC, "fours" were the most common ship type fielded by the fleet of Sextus Pompeius, and several ships of this kind are recorded in the two praetorian fleets of the Imperial Roman navy.

It is known from references from both the Second Punic War and the Battle of Mylae that the quadrireme had two levels of oarsmen, and was therefore lower than the quinquereme, while being of about the same width (c. 5.6 m). Its displacement must have been around 60 tonnes, and its carrying capacity at c. 75 marines. It was especially valued for its great speed and manoeuvrability, while its relatively shallow draught made it ideal for coastal operations. The "four" was classed as a "major ship" (maioris formae) by the Romans, but as a light craft, serving alongside triremes, in the navies of the major Hellenistic kingdoms like Egypt.

=== Quinquereme ===
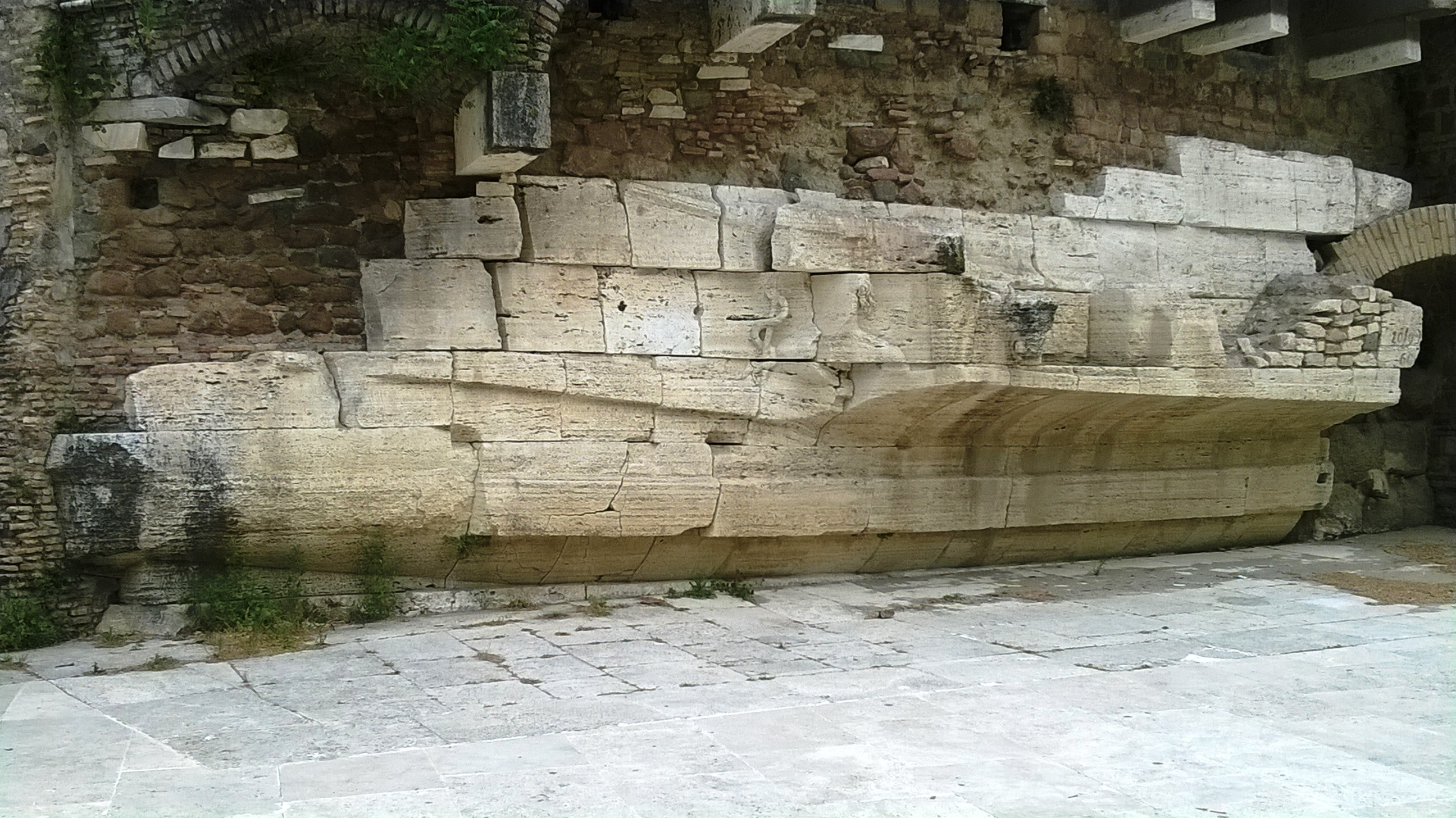
The Isola Tiberina prow in Rome. according to Coates, it depicts a Greek-type "five" or "six", while according to Murray, it is a "five".

Perhaps the most famous of the Hellenistic-era warships, because of its extensive use by the Carthaginians and Romans, the quinquereme (Latin: quīnquerēmis; Ancient Greek: πεντήρης, pentērēs) was invented by the tyrant of Syracuse, Dionysius I (r. 405–367 BC) in 399 BC, as part of a major naval armament program directed against the Carthaginians. During most of the 4th century, the "fives" were the heaviest type of warship, and often used as flagships of fleets composed of triremes and quadriremes. Sidon had them by 351, and the Athenian navy fielded some in 324.

In the eastern Mediterranean, they were superseded as the heaviest ships by the massive polyremes that began appearing in the last two decades of the 4th century, but in the West, they remained the mainstay of the Carthaginian navy. When the Roman Republic, which hitherto lacked a significant navy, was embroiled in the First Punic War with Carthage, the Roman Senate set out to construct a fleet of 100 quinqueremes and 20 triremes. According to Polybius, the Romans seized a shipwrecked Carthaginian quinquereme and used it as a blueprint for their own ships, but it is stated that the Roman copies were heavier than the Carthaginian vessels, which were better built. The quinquereme provided the workhorse of the Roman and Carthaginian fleets throughout their conflicts, although "fours" and "threes" are also mentioned. Indeed, so ubiquitous was the type that Polybius uses it as a shorthand for "warship" in general.

According to Polybius, at the Battle of Cape Ecnomus, the Roman quinqueremes carried a total crew of 420, 300 of whom were rowers, and the rest marines. Leaving aside a deck crew of c. 20 men, and accepting the 2–2–1 pattern of oarsmen, the quinquereme would have 90 oars in each side, and 30-strong files of oarsmen. The fully decked quinquereme could also carry a marine detachment of 70 to 120, giving a total complement of about 400. A "five" would be c. 45 m long, displace around 100 tonnes, be some 5 m wide at water level, and have its deck standing c. 3 m above the sea. Polybius said the quinquereme was superior to the old trireme, which was retained in service in significant numbers by many smaller navies. Accounts by Livy and Diodorus Siculus also show that the "five", being heavier, performed better than the triremes in bad weather.

The Republic of Venice in the 1520s built what was called a quinquereme based on the design of Vettor Fausto, who based it on his readings of classical texts.

=== Hexareme ===
The hexareme or sexireme (Latin: hexēris; Ancient Greek: ἑξήρης, hexērēs) is affirmed by the ancient historians Pliny the Elder and Aelian to have been invented in Syracuse. "Sixes" were certainly present in the fleet of Dionysius II of Syracuse (r. 367–357, 346–344 BC), but they may well have been invented in the last years of his father, Dionysius I. "Sixes" were rarer than smaller vessels, and appear in the sources chiefly as flagships: at the Battle of Ecnomus, the two Roman consuls each had a hexareme, Ptolemy XII (r. 80–58, 55–51 BC) had one as his personal flagship, as did Sextus Pompeius. At the Battle of Actium, hexaremes were present in both fleets, but with a notable difference: while in the fleet of Octavian they were the heaviest type of vessel, in the fleet of Mark Antony they were the second smallest, after the quinqueremes. A single hexareme, the Ops, is later recorded as the heaviest ship serving in the praetorian Fleet of Misenum.

The exact arrangement of the hexareme's oars is unclear. If it evolved naturally from the earlier designs, it would be a trireme with two rowers per oar; the less likely alternative is that it had two levels with three oarsmen at each. Reports about "sixes" used during the 1st-century BC Roman civil wars indicate that they were of a similar height to the quinqueremes, and record the presence of towers on the deck of a "six" serving as flagship to Marcus Junius Brutus.

=== Septireme ===
Pliny the Elder attributes the creation of the septireme (Latin: septiremis; Ancient Greek: ἑπτήρης, heptērēs) to Alexander the Great. Curtius corroborates this, and reports that the king gave orders for wood for 700 septiremes to be cut in Mount Lebanon, to be used in his projected circumnavigations of the Arabian peninsula and Africa. For Salamis, Demetrius Poliorcetes had seven such ships built in Phoenicia and, later, Ptolemy II (r. 283–246 BC) had 36 septiremes constructed. Pyrrhus of Epirus (r. 306–302, 297–272 BC) also apparently had at least one "seven", which was captured by the Carthaginians and eventually lost at Mylae.

Presumably, the septireme was derived by adding a standing rower to the lower level of the hexareme.

=== Octeres ===
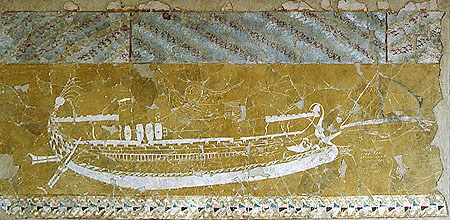
Graffiti from the Greek colony of Nymphaion in the Crimea, depicting a heavy polyreme of the 3rd century BC, with fore- and aft-castles.

Very little is known about the octeres (Ancient Greek: ὀκτήρης, oktērēs). At least two of their type were in the fleet of Philip V of Macedon (r. 221–179 BC) at the Battle of Chios in 201 BC, where they were rammed in their prows. Their last appearance was at Actium, where Mark Antony is said by Plutarch to have had many "eights". Based on the comments of Orosius that the larger ships in Antony's fleet were only as high as the quinqueremes (their deck standing at c. 3 m above water), it is presumed that "eights", as well as the "nines" and "tens", were rowed at two levels.

An exceptionally large "eight", the Leontophoros, is recorded by Memnon of Heraclea to have been built by Lysimachus (r. 306–281 BC), one of the Diadochi. It was richly decorated, required 1,600 rowers (8 files of 100 per side) and could support 1,200 marines. Remarkably for a ship of its size, its performance at sea was reportedly very good. The Romans used similar ships as troop carriers and flagships.

=== Enneres ===
The ennērēs (Greek: ἐννήρης) is first recorded in 315 BC, when three of their type were included in the fleet of Antigonus Monophthalmus. The presence of "nines" in Antony's fleet at Actium is recorded by Florus and Cassius Dio, although Plutarch makes explicit mention only of "eights" and "tens". The oaring system may have been a modification of the quadrireme, with two teams of five and four oarsmen.

=== Deceres ===
Like the septireme, the deceres (Ancient Greek: δεκήρης, dekērēs) is attributed by Pliny to Alexander the Great, and they are present alongside "nines" in the fleet of Antigonus Monophthalmus in 315 BC. Indeed, it is most likely that the "ten" was derived from adding another oarsman to the "nine". A "ten" is mentioned as Philip V's flagship at Chios in 201 BC, and their last appearance was at Actium, where they constituted Antony's heaviest ships.

=== Larger polyremes ===
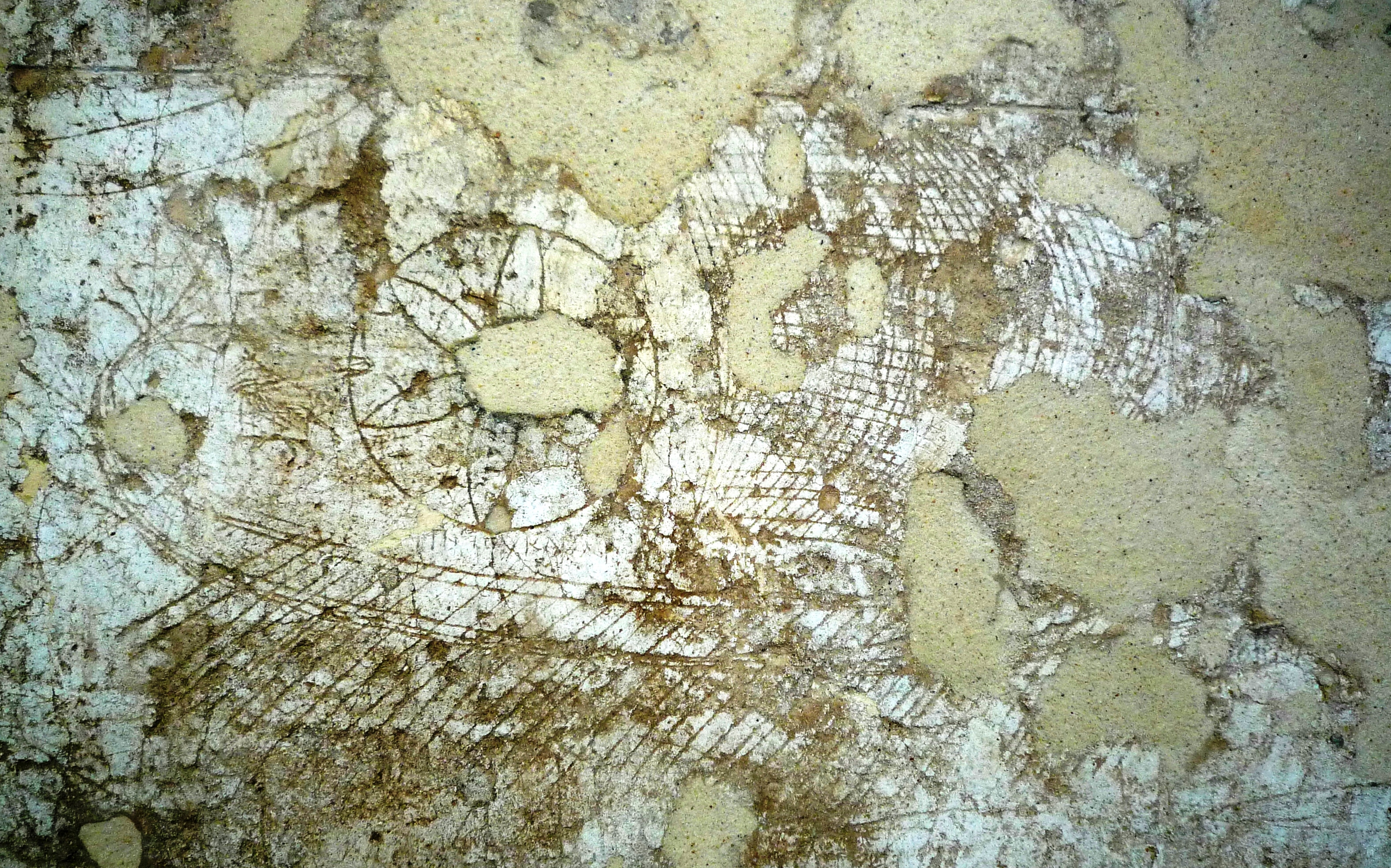
This graffito perhaps represents a very large polyreme ship, as it shows 50 oars on one side. It was first copied by Capt. Carlini in the 1930s and is now preserved at the Archaeological Museum of Delos where this picture was taken in 2015.

The tendency to build ever bigger ships that appeared in the last decades of the 4th century did not stop at the "ten". Demetrius Poliorcetes built "elevens", "thirteens", "fourteens", "fifteens" and "sixteens", and his son, Antigonus II Gonatas had an "eighteen", while Ptolemy II's navy fielded 14 "elevens", 2 "twelves", 4 "thirteens", and even one "twenty" and two "thirties". Eventually, Ptolemy IV built a "forty" (tessarakontērēs) that was 130 metres (430 ft) long, required 4,000 rowers and 400 other crew, and could support a force of 2,850 marines on its decks. However, "tens" seem to be the largest to have been used in battle.

The larger polyremes were possibly double-hulled catamarans. It has been suggested that, with the exception of the "forty", these ships must have been rowed at two levels.

== Light warships ==
Several types of fast vessels were used during this period, the successors of the 6th and 5th-century BC triacontors (τριακόντοροι, triakontoroi, "thirty-oars") and pentecontors (πεντηκόντοροι, pentēkontoroi, "fifty-oars"). Their primary use was in piracy and scouting, but they also found their place in the battle line.

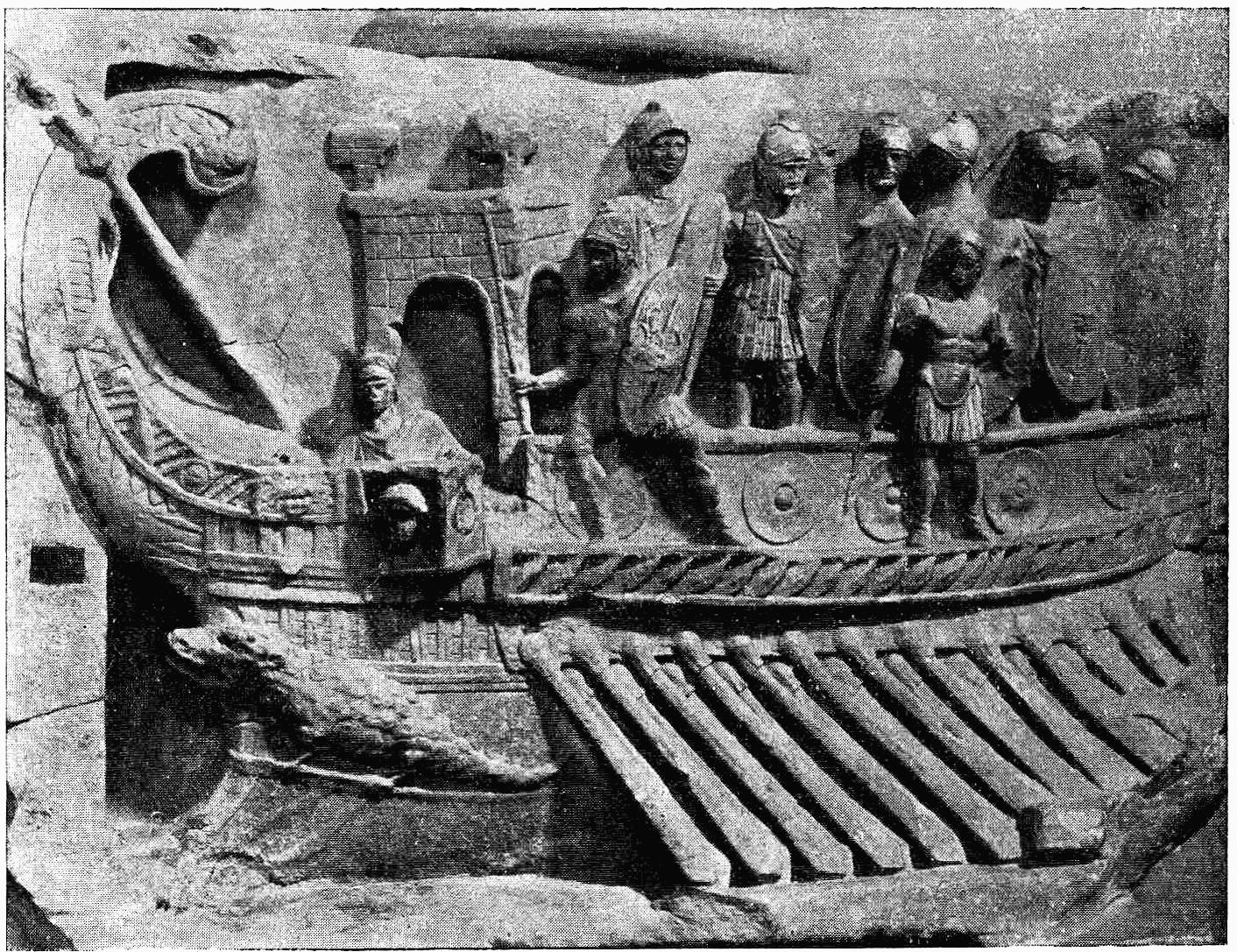
A Roman bireme depicted in a relief from the Temple of Fortuna Primigenia in Praeneste (Palastrina), which was built c. 120 BC; exhibited in the Pius-Clementine Museum (Museo Pio-Clementino) in the Vatican Museums.

=== Lembos ===
The term lembos (from Greek: λέμβος, "skiff", in Latin lembus) is used generically for boats or light vessels, and more specifically for a light warship, most commonly associated with the vessels used by the Illyrian tribes, chiefly for piracy, in the area of Dalmatia. This type of craft was also adopted by Philip V of Macedon, and soon after by the Seleucids, Rome, and even the Spartan king Nabis in his attempt to rebuild the Spartan navy.

In contemporary writings, the name was associated with a class rather than a specific type of vessels, as considerable variation is evident in the sources: the number of oars ranged from 16 to 50, they could be one- or double-banked, and some types did not have a ram, presumably being used as couriers and fast cargo vessels.

=== Hemiolia ===
The hemiolia or hemiolos (Greek: ἡμιολία [ναῦς] or ἡμίολος [λέμβος]) was a light and fast warship that appeared in the early 4th century BC. It was particularly favoured by pirates in the eastern Mediterranean, but also used by Alexander the Great as far as the rivers Indus and Hydaspes, and by the Romans as a troop transport. It is likely that the type was invented by pirates, probably in Caria.

Little is known of their characteristics, but Arrian, based on Ptolemy I (r. 323–283 BC), includes them amongst the triacontors. According to one view, it was manned by half the number of oarsmen to make room for the fighters. According to another, there were one and a half files of oarsmen on each side, with the additional half file placed amidships, where the hull was wide enough to accommodate them. In this view, they could have had 15 oars on each side, with a full file of ten and a half file of five or instead the middle oars may have been double-manned. Given their lighter hulls, greater length and generally slimmer profile, the hemiolia would have had an advantage in speed even over other light warships like the liburnian.

=== Trihemiolia ===
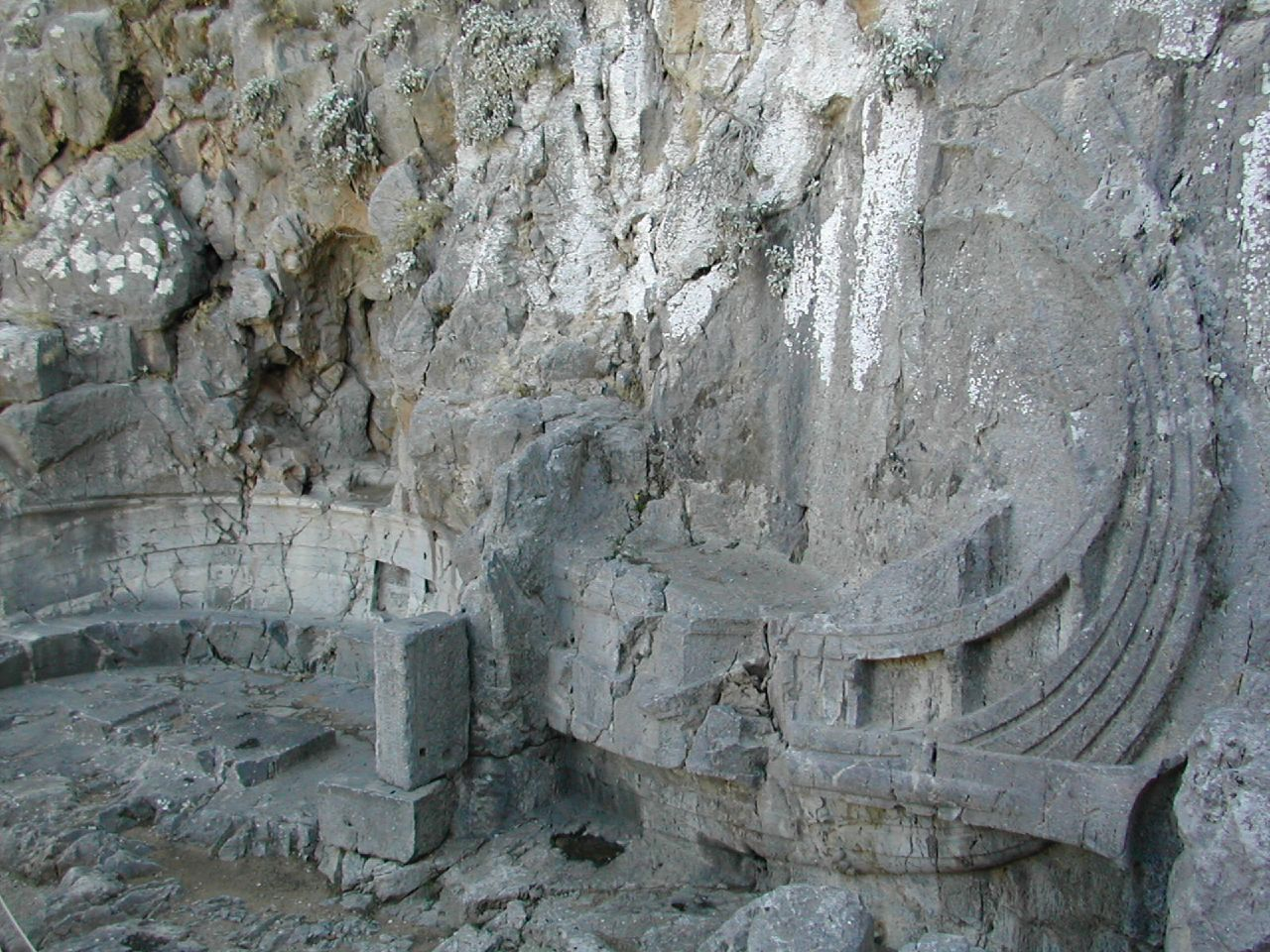
Relief of a Rhodian galley, most likely a trihemiolia, carved in the rock beneath the acropolis of Lindos.

The trihemiolia (Greek: τριημιολία [ναῦς]) first appears in accounts of the Siege of Rhodes by Demetrius Poliorcetes in 304 BC, where a squadron of trihemioliai was sent out as commerce raiders. The type was one of the chief vessels of the Rhodian navy, and it is very likely that it was also invented there, as a counter to the pirates' swift hemioliai. So great was the attachment of the Rhodians to this type of vessel, that for a century after their navy was abolished by Gaius Cassius Longinus in 46 BC, they kept a few as ceremonial vessels.

The type was classed with the trireme, and had two and a half files of oarsmen on each side. Judging from the Lindos relief and the famous Nike of Samothrace, both of which are thought to represent trihemioliai, the two upper files would have been accommodated in an oarbox, with the half-file located beneath them in the classic thalamitai position of the trireme. The Lindos relief also includes a list of the crews of two trihemioliai, allowing us to deduce that each was crewed by 144 men, 120 of whom were rowers (hence a full file numbered 24). Reconstruction based on the above sculptures shows that the ship was relatively low, with a boxed-in superstructure, a displacement of c. 40 tonnes, and capable of reaching speeds comparable with those of a full trireme. The trihemiolia was a very successful design, and was adopted by the navies of Ptolemaic Egypt and Athens among others. Despite being classed as lighter warships, they were sometimes employed in a first-line role, for instance at the Battle of Chios.

=== Liburnians ===
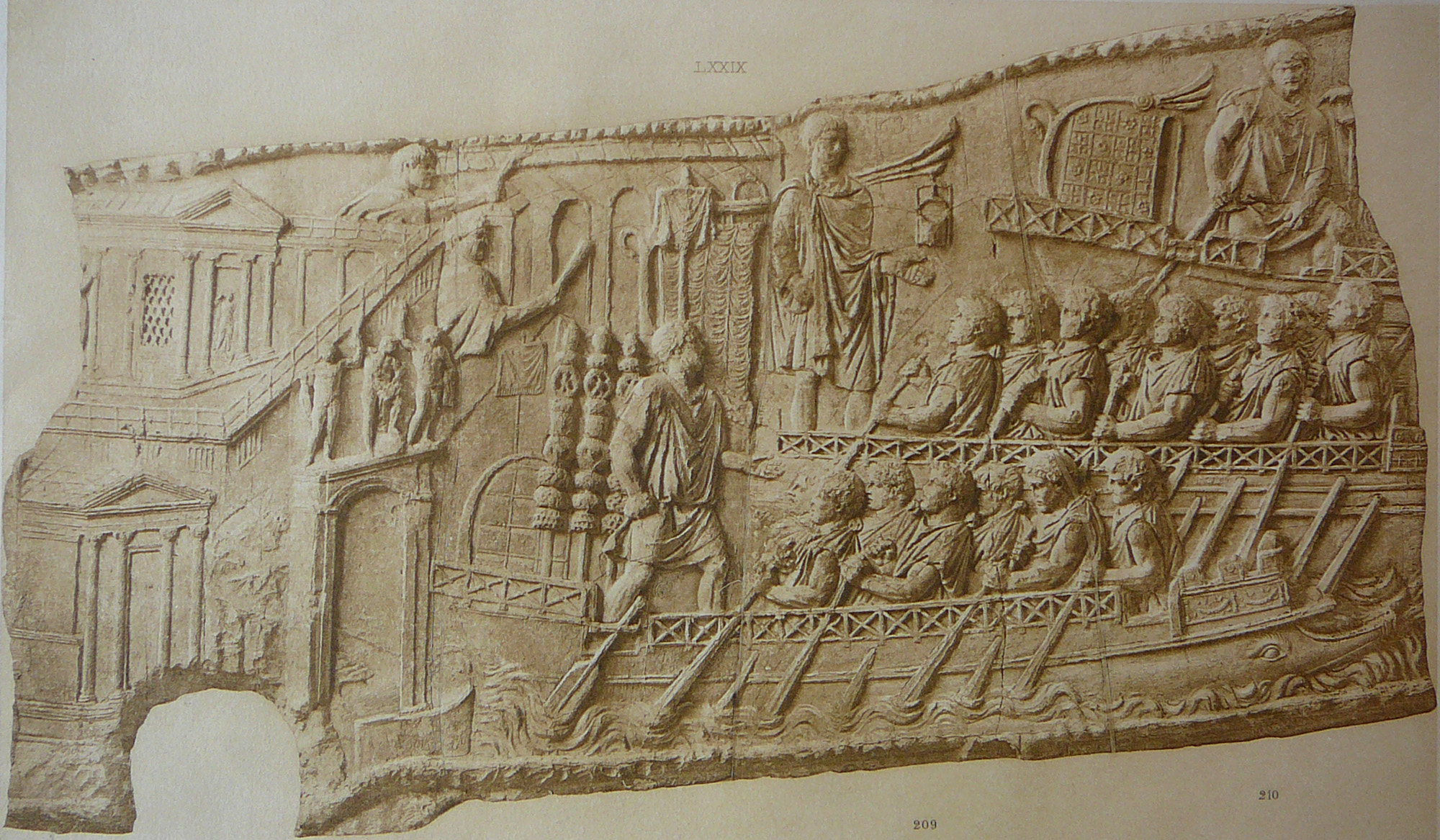
Bireme Roman warships, probably liburnians, of the Danube fleet during Trajan's Dacian Wars.

The liburnian (Latin: liburna, Greek: λιβυρνίς, libyrnis) was a variant of lembos invented by the tribe of the Liburnians. Initially used for piracy and scouting, this light and swift vessel was adopted by the Romans during the Illyrian Wars, and eventually became the mainstay of the fleets of the Roman Empire following Actium, displacing the heavier vessels. Especially the provincial Roman fleets were composed almost exclusively of liburnians. Livy, Lucan and Appian all describe the liburnian as bireme; they were fully decked (cataphract) ships, with a sharply pointed prow, providing a more streamlined shape designed for greater speed. In terms of speed, the liburnian was probably considerably slower than a trireme, but on a par with a "five".

== See also ==
- Hellenistic armies

== Sources ==
- Lucien Basch (1989) "Le 'navire invaincu à neuf rangées de rameurs' de Pausanias (I, 29.1) et le 'Monument des Taureaux', à Delos", in TROPIS III, ed. H. Tzalas, Athens. ISBN 978-1-107-00133-6
- Casson, Lionel (1991). The Ancient Mariners (2nd ed.). Princeton University Press. ISBN 0-691-01477-9.
- Casson, Lionel (1995). Ships and Seamanship in the Ancient World. Baltimore and London: Johns Hopkins University Press. ISBN 0-8018-5130-0.
- Casson, Lionel (1994). "The Age of the Supergalleys". Ships and Seafaring in Ancient Times. University of Texas Press. ISBN 0-292-71162-X. Archived from the original on 2016-10-14.
- Coates, John F. (1995). "The Naval Architecture and Oar Systems of Ancient Galleys". In Morrison, John S.; Gardiner, Robert (eds.). The Age of the Galley: Mediterranean Oared Vessels Since Pre-Classical Times. London: Conway Maritime Press. pp. 127–141. ISBN 0-85177-554-3.
- Ferreiro, Larrie D. (2010). "The Aristotelian Heritage in Early Naval Architecture, From the Venice Arsenal to the French Navy, 1500–1700". Theoria: An International Journal for Theory, History and Foundations of Science. 25 (2): 227–241. doi:10.1387/theoria.617. hdl:10810/39435. S2CID 170627252.
- Foley, Vernon; Soedel, Werner (April 1981). "Ancient oared warships". Scientific American. 244 (4): 116–129. Bibcode:1981SciAm.244d.148F. doi:10.1038/scientificamerican0481-148.
- Goldsworthy, Adrian (2000). The Fall of Carthage: The Punic Wars 265–146 BC. Cassell. ISBN 0-304-36642-0.
- Meijer, Fik (1986). A History of Seafaring in the Classical World. Croom and Helm. ISBN 0-312-00075-8.
- J. S. Morrison and R. T. Williams, Greek Oared Ships: 900–322 BC, Cambridge University Press, 1968.
- Morrison, John S.; Coates, John F. (1996). Greek and Roman Oared Warships. Oxford: Oxbow Books. ISBN 1-900188-07-4.
- Morrison, John S. (1995). "Hellenistic Oared Warships 399-31 BC". In Morrison, John S.; Gardiner, Robert (eds.). The Age of the Galley: Mediterranean Oared Vessels Since Pre-Classical Times. London: Conway Maritime Press. pp. 66–77. ISBN 0-85177-554-3.
- Murray, William (2012). The Age of Titans, the Rise and Fall of the Great Hellenistic Navies. Oxford University Press. ISBN 978-0-19-538864-0.
- Rankov, Boris (2013). "Ships and Shipsheds". Shipsheds of the Ancient Mediterranean. Cambridge University Press. pp. 76–101.
- de Souza, Philip (2008). "Naval Forces". In Sabin, Philip; van Wees, Hans; Whitby, Michael (eds.). The Cambridge History of Greek and Roman Warfare, Volume 1: Greece, the Hellenistic world and the rise of Rome. Cambridge University Press. pp. 357–367. ISBN 978-0-521-85779-6.
- Torr, Cecil (1895). Ancient Ships. Harvard University Press.
