= Crossbow II =

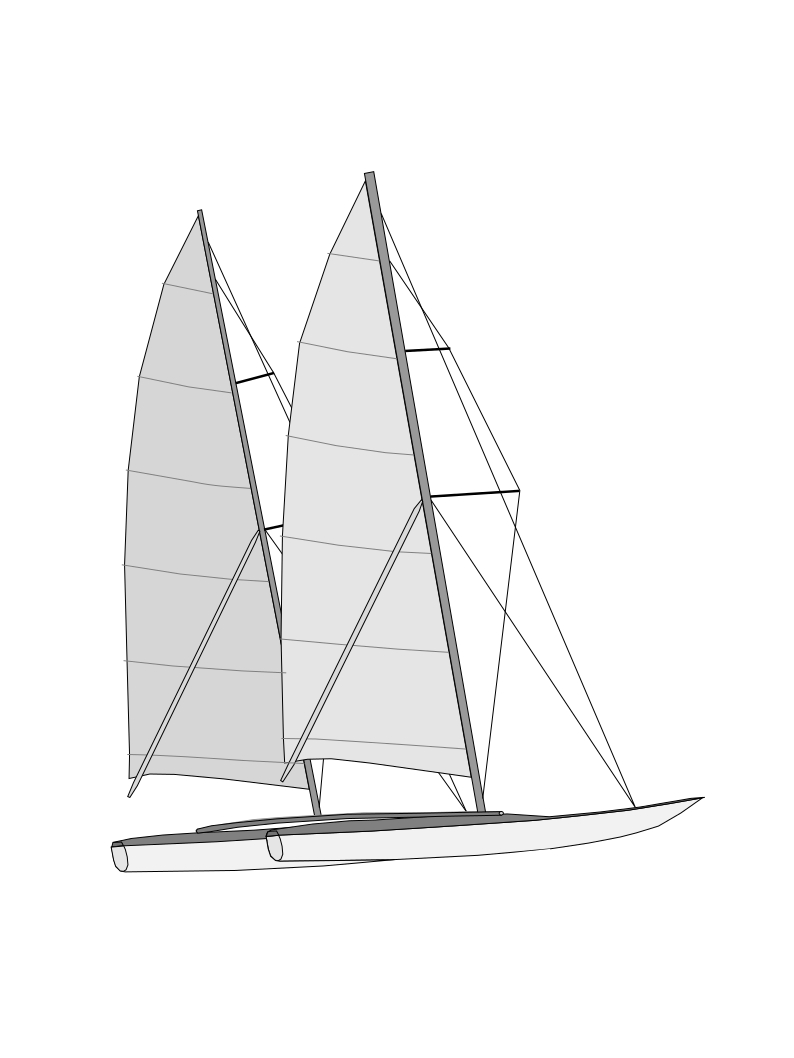
Crossbow II

Crossbow II was a late 1970s proa (or asymmetrical catamaran) sailboat, the successor craft to Crossbow.

The catamaran was designed by Rod Macalpine-Downie and was built by former Olympian Tim Whelpton at his boatyard in Upton near Acle.

It revised the world sailing speed record of its predecessor until 1980, finally reaching 36 knots (41 mph), a record it held until 1986.

== See also ==
- List of multihulls
- Crossbow
- Sir Timothy James Alan Colman
