= Tessarakonteres =

3rd century BC Egyptian catamaran galley

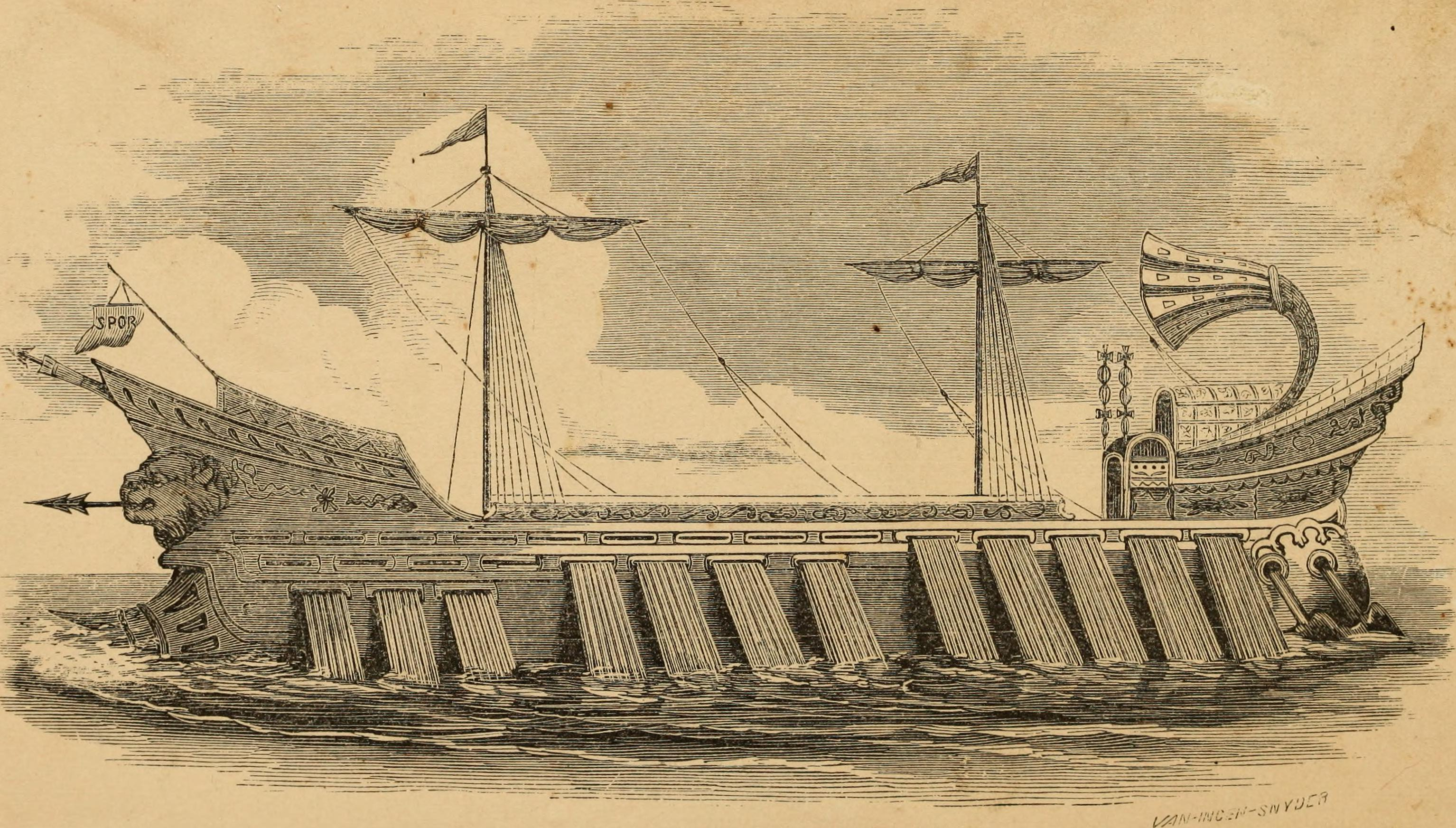
The Tessarakonteres, 1858 illustration

Tessarakonteres (Greek: τεσσαρακοντήρης, "forty-rowed"), or simply "forty", was a very large catamaran galley reportedly built in the Hellenistic period by Ptolemy IV Philopator of Egypt. It was described by a number of ancient sources, including a lost work by Callixenus of Rhodes and surviving texts by Athenaeus and Plutarch. According to these descriptions, supported by modern research by Lionel Casson, the enormous size of the vessel made it impractical and it was built only as a prestige vessel, rather than an effective warship. The name "forty" refers not to the number of oars, but to the number of rowers on each vertical "column" of oars that propelled it, and at the size described it could have been the largest ship constructed in antiquity, and probably the largest human-powered vessel ever built.

== Sources ==
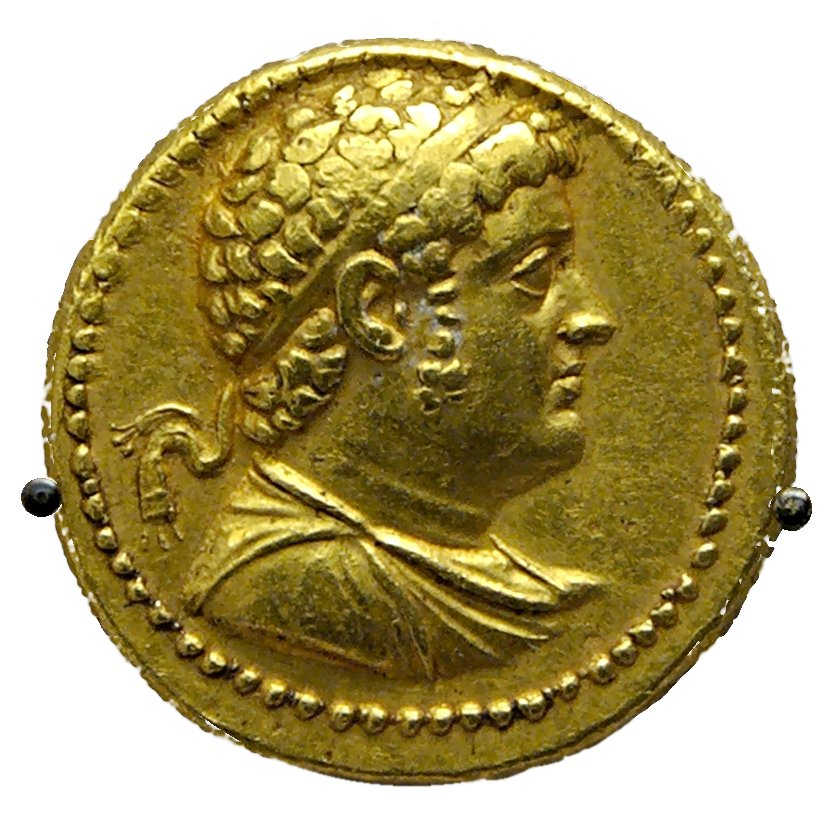
Ptolemy IV, who ordered the ship built

The "forty" was reportedly built by Ptolemy IV Philopator of Egypt in the 3rd century BC. It was first described by his contemporary Callixenus of Rhodes in the lost Peri Alexandreias. In the early-3rd century AD, Athenaeus quotes this in his Deipnosophistae.

Philopator built a ship with forty ranks of rowers, being two hundred and eighty cubits long and thirty-eight cubits from one side to the other; and in height up to the gunwale it was forty-eight cubits; and from the highest part of the stern to the water-line was fifty-three cubits; and it had four rudders, each thirty cubits long ... And the ship had two heads and two sterns, and seven beaks ... And when it put to sea it held more than four thousand rowers, and four hundred supernumeraries; and on the deck were three thousand marines, or at least two thousand eight hundred and fifty. And besides all these there was another large body of men under the decks, and a vast quantity of provisions and supplies.

Plutarch, writing in the late 1st century AD, also mentioned this immense vessel in his Life of Demetrius, part of his Parallel Lives series, disagreeing or misquoting slightly on the height to top of stern, which he reports as forty-eight cubits:

Ptolemy Philopator built [a ship] of forty banks of oars, which had a length of two hundred and eighty cubits, and a height, to the top of her stern, of forty-eight; she was manned by four hundred sailors, who did no rowing, and by four thousand rowers, and besides these she had room, on her gangways and decks, for nearly three thousand men-at‑arms. But this ship was merely for show; and since she differed little from a stationary edifice on land, being meant for exhibition and not for use, she was moved only with difficulty and danger.

Note that the translation of "forty banks" is overliteral; see below.

== Configuration of the oars ==
Depiction of the position of the rowers in three different levels (from top: thranitai, zygitai and thalamitai) in a Greek trireme.

The trireme, a three-ranked galley with one man per oar, was the main Hellenistic warship up to and into the 4th century BC. At that time, a requirement for heavier ships led to the development of "polyremes" meaning "many oars", applied to "fours" (tetre- in Greek, quadri- in Latin) or more and "fives" (penta- in Greek, quinque- in Latin) and later up to "tens", the largest that seems to have been used in battle. Larger polyremes were built, with Ptolemy II Philadelphus eventually building a "twenty" and a "thirty", and Ptolemy IV Philopator building the "forty".

The maximum practical number of oar ranks a ship could have logistically was three (Greek and Latin tri-). Beyond three, the number in the type name did not refer to the number of ranks of oars any more (as for biremes and triremes, respectively two and three ranks of oars with one rower per oar), but to the number of rowers per vertical section, with several men on each oar. Indeed, just because a ship was designated with a larger type number did not mean it necessarily had or operated all three possible ranks: the quadrireme may have been a simple evolution of a standard trireme, but with two rowers on the top oar; it may also have been a bireme with two men on each oar; or it may just have had a single rank with four men on each single oar. Classes of ship could differ in their configuration between regions and over time, but in no case did a "four" ship have four horizontal ranks of oars.

From galleys used in the 16th to 18th centuries AD, it is known that the maximum number of men that can operate a single oar efficiently is eight. Further, Casson writes that the oars were the proper length for no more than eight rowers.

Mention by Callixenus of the "forty's" thranite (the uppermost rowing level of a trireme) oars leads Casson to determine that the "forty" had three ranks. He points to the practical limit of eight rowers to an oar, giving a maximum size class of "twenty-four", as well as to the need for a vastly larger deck than one ship could provide in order to accommodate the reported numbers of marines. Combined with Callixenus's description of the ship having two heads and two sterns, Casson suggests that the "forty" must have been a catamaran made up of two three-ranked "twenties" joined by a deck. Each column or section of the ship would be composed of twenty rowers; perhaps eight rowers on each section's top rank, seven in the middle, and five on the bottom rank.

== Specifications ==
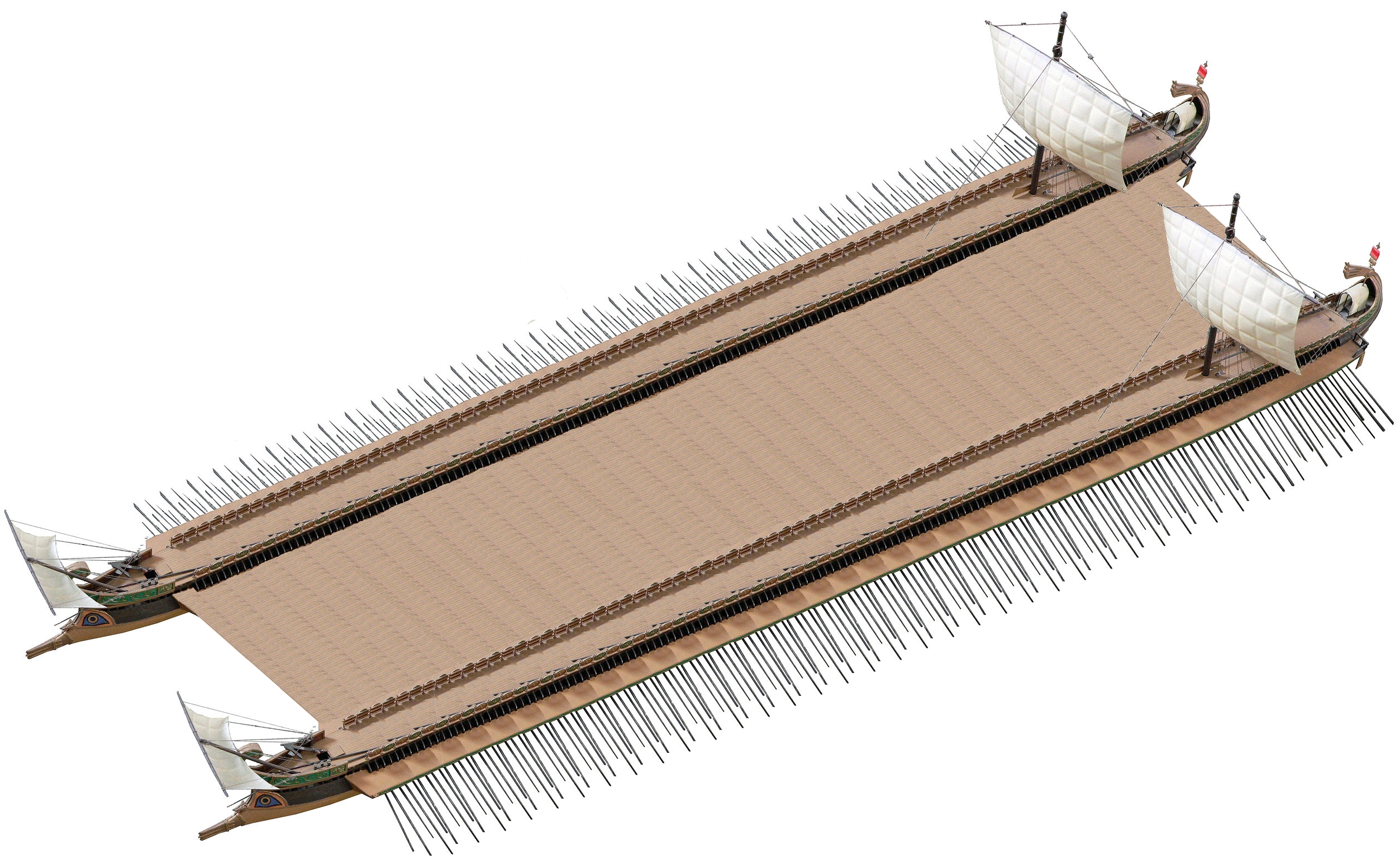
Speculative illustration of the Tessarakonteres with catamaran hulls, as Casson suggests

As a catamaran of two "twentys" with 4,000 oarsmen, there would be 2,000 per hull and therefore 1,000 per side. The 130 m length would allow ample room for the 50 vertical sections of three oars each, with each vertical section accommodating 20 rowers (hence the designation "twenty"). Thus there would be 150 oars per side. Casson has suggested that it was possible that the two internal sides were not equipped with oars and that the rowers there acted as reserve crew for those on the outer side, so the "forty" would have had either 300 or 600 oars.

=== Details ===
- Length: 280 cubits, 420 ft (130 m)
- Beam: 38 cubits, 57 ft (17 m) (per catamaran hull if Casson is correct)
- Height from waterline to tip of stern: 53 cubits, 79.5 ft (24.2 m)
- Height from waterline to tip of prow: 48 cubits, 72 ft (22 m)
- Length of steering oars (4): 30 cubits, 45 ft (14 m)
- Longest rowing oars: 38 cubits, 57 ft (17 m)
- Oarsmen: 4,000
- Officers, ratings, deckhands: 400
- Marines: 2,850

=== Use ===
It had seven naval rams, with one primary, and the deck would have provided a stable platform for catapults that were often mounted on supergalleys. However, the "forty" was likely just a showpiece; Plutarch describes the ship as for exhibition only.

=== Launch ===
In order to launch the huge ship the engineers devised a – then novel – dry dock construction:

But after that a Phoenician devised a new method of launching it (the Tessarakonteres), having dug a trench under it, equal to the ship itself in length, which he dug close to the harbour. And in the trench he built props of solid stone five cubits deep, and across them he laid beams crosswise, running the whole width of the trench, at four cubits' distance from one another; and then making a channel from the sea he filled all the space which he had excavated with water, out of which he easily brought the ship by the aid of whatever men happened to be at hand; then closing the entrance which had been originally made, he drained the water off again by means of engines (organois); and when this had been done the vessel rested securely on the before-mentioned cross-beams.

It has been calculated that the dock might have needed around 750,000 gallons of water to lift up the vessel.

== Controversy ==
Even in the 19th century, the fabulous description of the vessel has been questioned. Given the technical problems facing a ship of such size, the vessel would not have existed at all, or the description given was an exaggeration. Frank Boott Goodrich (1858) pointed out several problems of the vessel:

- The vessel was originally stated to be forty tiers (of rowers). The vessel would need oars of some 70 feet (21.34 m) in length for the topmost tier, unlikely to be feasible in that era.
- Since the number of oars and oarsmen is stated to be 4000, they would have been hard to manage.
- The size of the complement is fantastical too, 2850 combatant and 4000 rowers, a total of 6850 men.
- The vessel was said to have "double prows"; if this is interpreted as catamaran, the force and pressure of water would separate them due to the great resistance exerted by the huge size of the vessel.
- The huge size of the vessel would prove to be very hard to maneuver, a U-turn requiring about 1 hour in a large radius.

== See also ==
- Chinese treasure ship, believed by some to be ceremonial thanks to its impractical size
- Leontophoros, another Hellenistic ship with disputed length
- Jong, a type of large Javanese ship, some are noted to be larger than the largest Portuguese ships
- List of longest wooden ships

== Sources ==
- Landels, J. G. (2000), Engineering in the Ancient World (Revised ed.), University of California Press, ISBN 0-520-22782-4
- Oleson, John Peter (1984), Greek and Roman Mechanical Water-Lifting Devices: The History of a Technology, University of Toronto Press, ISBN 90-277-1693-5
