= Derek Kelsall =

Welsh sailboat designer (1933–2022)

Derek Kelsall (15 May 1933 – 11 December 2022) was an English multihull sailboat designer latterly resident in New Zealand. He began his career in surveying and in the oil industry. Born in north Wales on 15 May 1933, he died in Thames, New Zealand on 11 December 2022, at the age of 89.

== Toria ==
Toria was a trimaran sailboat designed by Kelsall and launched in 1966. It was named after Kelsall's daughter. In 1966 Toria won the first RWYC Two-Handed Round Britain Race. It also won fifth place in the solo Atlantic race. In 1976, it caught fire during the solo Atlantic race. Toria was the first design by Kelsall, the first foam sandwich constructed trimaran in the world, and is directly credited with igniting French interest in multihull sailing.

I believe it is fair to say that [Toria] set the style for the racing trimarans. She sailed on two hulls, minimum weight foam sandwich, long full buoyant floats with full transom, curved beam and with one hull flying even at rest. Toria's weakness was her rig, which we put right on sister ship Trifle - same hulls, 20% wider, full battened mainsail, rotating mast and 7/8ths genoa.

— Derek Kelsall

== Trifle ==
Toria led directly to the design of Trifle, a 42 ft (13 m) trimaran sailboat designed by Kelsall and produced in 1966 as a further development of his first trimaran. Featuring a full roach main and small jib, the vessel took part in the 1967 Crystal Trophy race in the English Channel. At the time, it was considered one of the fastest ocean-going multihulls in the world.

== VSD 2 ==
VSD 2 was a 54-ft trimaran designed by Kelsall and built in 1979 for French yachtsman Eugène Riguidel who sailed her in the 1981 TwoSTAR, in which he achieved eighth place. Its load waterline length was 16.4 m (54 ft).

== See also ==
- List of multihulls
- Mirrorcat (catamaran)
