= Crossbow (proa) =

Crossbow was an early 1970s proa (or asymmetrical catamaran) sailboat.

The vessel was designed by Rod Macalpine-Downie. It was 56 feet long and had a 60 foot mast, but was only 22 inches wide. It was built of cold moulded plywood. The smaller, outrigger hull was removed by 30 feet from the main hull.

In 1972 Crossbow claimed the record for the world's fastest yacht at 26.3 knots.

Crossbow has been preserved and was owned by Sir Timothy Colman.

== See also ==
- List of multihulls
- Crossbow II
- Sir Timothy James Alan Colman
