= Lionel Casson =

American classicist (1914–2009)

- Born: Lionel I. Cohen; July 22, 1914; Brooklyn, New York City
- Died: July 18, 2009 (aged 94); New York City
- Education: New York University
- Occupation: Classicist
- Spouse: Julia Michelman (m. 1946 - 2009, his death)

Lionel Casson (July 22, 1914 – July 18, 2009) was a classical archaeologist, professor emeritus at New York University, and a specialist in maritime history. He earned his B.A. in 1934 at New York University, and in 1936 became an assistant professor. He later earned his Ph.D. there during 1939. In 2005 he was awarded the Archaeological Institute of America Gold Medal.

== Early years ==
He was born Lionel I. Cohen on July 22, 1914, in Brooklyn, and later changed his last name to "Casson". As a teenager he owned a sailboat that he would use on Long Island Sound. He attended New York University for all of his collegiate studies, earning a bachelor's degree there in 1934, a master's in 1936 and his Ph.D. in 1939 and was employed at NYU as an instructor. He served as an officer of the United States Navy during World War II, responsible for the interrogation of prisoners of war.

After completing his military service, Casson returned to NYU, where he served as a professor of classics from 1961 to 1979. The author of 23 books on maritime history and classic literature, Casson used ancient material ranging from Demosthenes's speeches and works by Thucydides to cargo manifests and archeological studies of ancient shipwrecks and the contents of the amphorae they carried to develop a framework for the development of shipbuilding, maritime trade routes and naval warfare in the ancient world.

== Classics ==
In a 2005 speech to the Archaeological Institute of America accepting its Gold Medal, Casson recalled a visit to Southern France in 1953 when he had the opportunity to visit Jacques-Yves Cousteau, who was performing an investigation of an ancient shipwreck. Once he visited the warehouse with the hundreds of amphorae that had been brought to the surface, Casson said that he immediately knew that he "was in on the beginning of a totally new source of information about ancient maritime matters and I determined then and there to exploit it" and integrate this new trove of data with the information he had been able to assemble from ancient writings.

His 1959 book The Ancient Mariners: Seafarers and Sea Fighters of the Mediterranean in Ancient Times told how civilizations along the Mediterranean Sea began by having their ships travel along the coast and then advanced to voyages across the sea, far from the sight of shore. Commerce and military ventures resulted in journeys to such remote locales as India with more specialized crafts designed that expanded the original flat-bottomed boats into vessels such as the trireme propelled by hundreds of oarsmen to speeds of seven knots by its 170 oars. Illustrated History of Ships and Boats, published by Doubleday in 1964, provided a history of boats from ancient craft carved from wood or made from animal skins up to the day's most modern nuclear submarines.

Yale University Press published Casson's 2001 book Libraries in the Ancient World that uses references in ancient works and archeological evidence in the Middle East and the Greco-Roman world to follow the development of writing, the creation of the first books and the process of copying them by hand and assembling them into libraries. In the book, Casson puts Homer at the top of a most-popular author list, "with the Iliad favored over the Odyssey" on his best-seller list. He documents the transitions from clay tablets, to papyrus and parchment scrolls, and the development of the codex as the precursor of the modern book. Casson rejects the accepted wisdom that the Library of Alexandria was destroyed in 48 BC and argues that evidence shows that it continued in existence until 270 AD during the reign of Roman Emperor Aurelian.

He was a member of the all-male literary banqueting club the Trap Door Spiders.

Casson died of pneumonia in Manhattan at age 94 on July 18, 2009. He was survived by his wife, the former Julia Michelman, as well as two daughters and two grandchildren.

== Bibliography ==
- Casson, Lionel (1959). The Ancient Mariners : Seafarers and Sea Fighters of the Mediterranean in Ancient Times. Victor Gollancz.
- Casson, Lionel (1991). The Ancient Mariners (Second Edition). Princeton University Press. ISBN 0-691-01477-9
- Casson, Lionel (1960). Masters of Ancient Comedy. The MacMillan Co.
- Casson, Lionel (1980). Masters of Ancient Comedy: Selections from Aristophanes, Menander, Plautus, Terence. Funk & Wagnalls Co. ISBN 0-308-60016-9
- Casson, Lionel (1962). Selected Satires of Lucian. (Translated and edited by Casson.)
- Casson, Lionel (1964). Illustrated History of Ships & Boats. Doubleday & Company, Inc.
- Casson, Lionel (1974). Travel in the Ancient World. George Allen & Unwin Ltd.
- Casson, Lionel (1994). Travel in the Ancient World (Second Edition). The Johns Hopkins University Press. ISBN 0-8018-4808-3
- Casson, Lionel (1975). The Horizon Book of Daily Life in Ancient Rome. Simon & Schuster. ISBN 0-07-010216-3
- Casson, Lionel (1999). Everyday Life in Ancient Rome (Revised and Expanded Edition). The Johns Hopkins University Press. ISBN 0-8018-5992-1
- Casson, Lionel (1977). Mysteries of the Past. American Heritage Publishing Co.
- Casson, Lionel (1983). Great Ages of Man: Ancient Egypt. Random House Value Publishing. ISBN 0-517-41233-0
- Casson, Lionel (1995). Ships and Seamanship in the Ancient World. The Johns Hopkins University Press. ISBN 0-8018-5130-0
- Casson, Lionel (2001). Everyday Life in Ancient Egypt (Revised and Expanded Edition). The Johns Hopkins University Press. ISBN 0-8018-6601-4
- Casson, Lionel (2002). Libraries in the Ancient World (New Edition). Yale University Press. ISBN 0-300-09721-2
