= Monohull =

Type of boat or ship having only one hull

The relationship between monohulls & multihulls

A monohull is a type of boat having only one hull, unlike multihulled boats which can have two or more individual hulls connected to one another.

== Fundamental concept ==
Among the earliest hulls were simple logs, but these were generally unstable and tended to roll over easily. Hollowing out the logs into a dugout canoe doesn't help much unless the hollow section penetrates below the log's center of buoyancy, then a load carried low in the cavity actually stabilizes the craft. Adding weight or ballast to the bottom of the hull or as low as possible within the hull adds stability.

Naval architects place the center of gravity substantially below the center of buoyancy; in most cases this can only be achieved by adding weight or ballast. The use of stones and other weights as ballast can be traced back to the Romans, Phoenicians and Vikings. Modern ships carry tons of ballast in order to maintain their stability; even heavily laden cargo ships use ballast to optimize the distribution of weight.

== Uses ==
This is the most prevalent form of waterborne vessel.

== Variations ==
- Keels - Most sailing ships and larger sailboats have deep keels containing ballast which adds horizontal stabilility.
- Displacement hulls - Monohull boats frequently ride deeply in the water, this is known as a displacement hull.
- Planing hulls - Hulls that ride on top of the water are called planing hulls, because when they reach speed, the hulls are substantially lifted above the water; this is known as planing (to plane).

== References and bibliography ==
- Jim Howard, Charles J. Doane (2000). Handbook of offshore cruising: The Dream and Reality of Modern Ocean Cruising. Sheridan House, Inc. p. 280. ISBN 1-57409-093-3.
- C. A. Marchaj (2000). Aero-Hydrodynamics of Sailing. Tiller Publishing. ISBN 1-888671-18-1.
- C. A. Marchaj. Sail Performance. McGraw Hill. p. 400. ISBN 0-07-141310-3.
- C. A. Marchaj. Seaworthiness:The Forgotten Factor. Tiller Publishing. p. 372. ISBN 1-888671-09-2.

== See also ==
- Sailing
- Yachts
- Sailboats
- Multihull
- Keel
- Displacement (fluid)
- Displacement hull
- Hydrodynamics
- Buoyancy
- Catamaran
