= List of multihulls =

== Types ==
- catamaran = two symmetric hulls
- Pacific proa = two asymmetric hulls, reverse-shunting (interchangeable bow/stern)
- trimaran = three hulls
- quadrimaran = four hulls
- pentamaran = five hulls

== Pre-modern Austronesian ==
- ʻalia
- Amatasi
- Balangay
- Basnigan
- Baurua
- Camakau
- Catamaran
- Drua
- Jukung
- Kaep
- Kalia
- Karakoa
- Kora kora
- Lakana
- Lakatoi
- Ngalawa
- Oruwa
- Outrigger canoe
- Pahi
- Paraw
- Paruwa
- Proa
- Sandeq
- Takia
- Tepukei
- Tipairua
- Tongiaki
- Va'a-tele
- Vaka katea
- Vinta
- Wa
- Yathra doni

== Pre-modern Western ==
- Tessarakonteres and Thalamegos (3rd century BC)
- Simon & Jude or Invention I (1662)
- Invention II (1662)
- Experiment (1664)
- St. Michael the Archangel (1684)
- Experiment (1786)
- Taurus (1790s)

== 19th century ==
- Jersey (1812)
- York (1813)
- Nassau (1814)
- Steam Battery (1815)
- Double Trouble (1820)
- Castaliâ (1874)
- Amaryllis (1876)
- Calais-Douvres or Express (1877)
- Duplex (1877)
- Duster (1877)
- John Gilpin (1877)
- Original (early 19th century)
- Tarantella (1877)
- Teaser (1878)
- Zarifa (1878)
- Proa #1 (1898)

== 1900s ==
- Proa #2 (1903)
- Proa #3 (1903)
- Proa #4 (1908)
- Kommuna (1912), original name Volkhov

== 1930s ==
- Kaimiloa
- Kaimiloa-Wakea

== 1940s ==
- Manu Kai
- Naramatac
- Shearwater I

== 1950s ==
- Aikane
- Ay Ay
- Bunyip 20
- Egg Nog
- Frolic
- Last Pal
- Tangaroa (catamaran)
- Rongo
- Shearwater III
- Waikiki Surf
- Wharram catamarans

== 1960s ==
- DC‐14 Phantom
- A Class
- B Class
- C Class
- D Class
- Beverly
- Catalac 9M
- Cheshire 14
- Hellcats II
- Hirondelle Mk I
- Hobie 14
- Hobie 16
- Isotope
- Kraken 18
- Kraken 25
- Kraken 33
- Kraken 40
- Lodestar
- Pacific Catamaran
- Phoca or Tenmen
- Pen Duick IV or Manureva
- Rehu Moana
- Searunner 25
- Searunner 31
- Searunner 37
- Searunner 40
- Shark
- Snow Goose
- Stingray catamaran
- Tigercat
- Toria
- Tornado
- Trice
- Trifle
- Trine
- Trio

== 1970s ==
- Acapella (Olympus Photo)
- Catalac 8M
- Catalac 10M
- Catalac 12M
- Constant Camber 26
- Constant Camber 32
- Crossbow
- Crossbow II
- Crowther Buccaneer 24
- Crowther Buccaneer 28
- Crowther Buccaneer 33
- Crowther Buccaneer 36
- Crowther Buccaneer 40
- Dart 18
- Farrier Command 10
- Farrier Trailertri 18
- Farrier Trailertri 680
- Farrier Trailertri 720
- FT
- G-Cat 5.0
- Great Britain III
- Halcat
- Hobie 18
- Kaimalino
- Kriter IV
- Miss Nylex
- Nacra 5.2
- Polynesian Concept
- Prindle 18
- Reynolds 21
- Seaclipper 28
- Searunner 34
- Sprint 15
- Stiletto 27
- Sunburner
- Telstar 26 MK1
- Telstar 26 MK2
- Telstar 26 MK3
- Telstar 35
- Telstar 8m
- Third Turtle
- Topcat F1
- Trident 27
- Venta

== 1980s ==
- Atlantic 50
- Auscat
- Brittany Ferries
- Casamance 43
- Constant Camber 3M
- Constant Camber 23 Cyclone
- Constant Camber 30
- Constant Camber 35
- Constant Camber 37
- Constant Camber 40
- Constant Camber 44
- Corneel 26
- Dict Robert
- Discovery 20
- Dragonfly 800
- Elf Aquitaine
- Farrier F-27
- Farrier Tramp
- Fidji 39
- Fleury Michon (yacht)
- Fleury Michon IV
- FMV
- Formula Tag
- Gauliosis IV
- Gautier II
- G-Cat 5.7
- Great Britain IV
- Jet Services II
- Jet Services V
- Freshwater class
- First Fleet class
- Hobie 17
- Juniper
- Lagoon 55 (1987)
- Lagoon 57
- VSD 2
- Llinase
- Louisiane 37
- Maldives 32
- Matilda
- Matilda II
- Matilda III
- Matilda IV
- Moxie
- Mystère 6.0
- Our Lady Patricia
- Our Lady Pamela
- Paul Ricard
- Phantom 16 (catamaran)
- Prindle 18-2
- RC-27
- Royale II
- Sarimanok
- Seaclipper 10
- Seaclipper 34
- Seaclipper 38
- Seaclipper 41
- Sidinox
- ARC 15
- ARC 17
- ARC 19
- SuperCat 20
- Taipan 4.9
- Topcat Spitfire 2.3
- Topcat Spitfire 2.5
- Trac 14
- Trac 16
- William Saurin

== 1990s ==
- Antigua 37
- ARC 22
- Athena 38
- Avalon 8.2
- Avalon 9
- Bahia 46
- Brady 52
- Cable and Wireless Adventurer
- Cat-Link IV
- Cat Link V
- Catalonia
- Catana 581
- Catri 26
- Cat
- Centaurus II
- CityCat
- Condor 10
- Condor 12
- Condor Express
- Condor Vitesse
- Dart 16
- Douce France
- Dragonfly 600
- Dragonfly 1000
- Farrier F-9
- Farrier F-24 Mk II
- Farrier F-31
- Farrier F-36
- Farrier F-82
- Hammerhead 34
- Hoverspeed France
- Incat 045
- Incat 046
- Incat 050
- HarbourCat class
- Hobie Miracle 20
- Hobie Tiger
- Lagoon 35
- Lagoon 37
- Lagoon 380
- Lagoon 410
- Lagoon 42
- Lagoon 47
- Lagoon 470
- Marquises 53
- Marquises 56
- MDV1200
- Mystère 4.3
- Nacra 20
- Open 60
- Phantom 14 (catamaran)
- RC-30
- RV Triton
- Sealion 2000
- RiverCat class
- Scarab 670
- Seacat Scotland
- Seaclipper 16
- Sea Runner
- Stena Lynx III
- Stena Voyager
- Taipan 5.7
- Tobago 35
- Tarifa Jet
- Topcat K1
- Topcat K2
- Topcat K3
- TriFoiler
- Venezia 42
- WindRider 16
- WindRider Rave

== 2000s ==
- ARC 21
- Astus 14.1
- Astus 16.1
- Astus 20.1
- Astus 22
- Aussie 3m
- Belize 43
- Benchijigua Express
- Brady 45
- Catri 23
- Catri 24
- Corsair 28
- Corsair 37
- Dash 750
- Dragonfly 28
- Dragonfly 35
- Dragonfly 920
- Dragonfly 1200
- Earthrace
- Eleuthera 60
- Explorer 44
- Extreme 40
- Farrier F-32
- Farrier F-33
- Farrier F-39
- Farrier F-41
- Fountaine Pajot Eleuthera 60
- Formula 18
- Hobie Dragoon
- Hobie Getaway
- Hobie Wildcat
- Huakai
- Hydroptère
- Incat Tasmania
- HSV-2 Swift
- Independence class
- Lagoon 380
- Lagoon 570
- Lagoon 440
- Lagoon 500
- Lagoon 420
- Lagoon 400
- Lagoon 620
- Lagoon Power 43
- Lagoon Power 44
- Lavezzi 40
- Lipari 41
- M80 Stiletto
- Mahe 36
- MGC 66
- Milenium
- Multi 23
- Sorrento
- Nacra Infusion
- Tera Jet 3
- Orana 44
- Orange II
- Sea Fighter
- SL 16
- Spirit of Kangaroo Island
- Spitfire
- Sprint 750
- SuperCat class
- Telstar 28
- The Cat
- Type 022
- USAV Spearhead
- Viper F16
- Westpac Express
- Weta
- WindRider 10
- WindRider 17

== 2010s ==
- AC45
- AC72
- Alegria 67
- Amatasi 27
- Astus 18.2
- Astus 20.2
- Astus 24
- Atlantic 47
- Baydream 5.5
- Brady 57
- Brady Pathfinder M Series
- Catri 25
- Catri 27
- Constant Camber DC-3
- Cruze 970
- Dragonfly 32
- Ducky14s
- Ducky16
- Expandacraft Pocketcat
- Farrier F-22
- Farrier F-44
- Farrier F-85
- Flying Phantom Elite
- Flying Phantom Essentiel
- Formula 16
- Francisco
- Galathea 65
- Helia 44
- Ipanema 58
- Klewang
- Lagoon 52
- Lagoon 39
- Lagoon 450
- Lagoon 42-2
- Lagoon 560
- Lagoon 40
- Lagoon 77
- Lagoon 50
- Lagoon 46
- Lagoon 65
- Makar
- M32
- Nacra F16
- Nacra 17
- Neel 45
- Neel 65
- Planet
- Pulse 600
- Saba 50
- Salina 48
- Sanya 57
- Seacart 26
- Seacart 30
- Seaclipper 20
- Seaclipper 24
- Spearhead
- Topcat 4.5 (K4)
- Topcat Chico
- Tuo Chiang-class corvette
- Victoria 67
- Wavelength 780
- WindRider Rave V

== 2020s ==
- Dragonfly 36
- Dragonfly 40
- Lagoon 55
- Lagoon 51

== Brands ==
- Astusboats (Astus)
- Austal
- Brady Catamarans (Brady)
- Catrigroup
- Corsair Marine
- Dragonfly Trimarans (Dragonfly)
- Expandacraft
- Farrier Marine
- Fountaine-Pajot
- Gunboat (multihull) (Gunboat)
- Hobie
- Incat
- Kværner
- Lagoon catamaran
- Mystère
- Nacra Sailing
- Neel
- Outremer
- Prindle
- Rapido
- Seacart
- Sunreef
- Telstar
- Topcat
- Torpen
- Tricat
- Wavelength
- WindRider

== Unsorted ==
- Cross 18
- Cross 24
- Cross 26
- Cross 36
- Cross 46
- Cross 50
- Cross 52
- Crowther Buccaneer 35
- Farrier F-25
- Farrier F-28
- Fulmar 19
- Hammerhead 54
- RC 27
- RC 30
- Scarab 16
- Scarab 18
- Scarab 22
- Scarab 32
- Scarab 350
- Scarab 650
- Scarab 8
- Skyhook 39
- Stealth F16
- Strike 15
- Strike 16
- Strike 18
- Tri-star 18
- Tri-star 24
- Tri-star 25
- Tri-star 26 MT
- Tri-star 27-9
- Tri-star 31 CM
- Tri-star 31
- Tri-star 32 XR
- Tri-star 35 XR
- Tri-star 35
- Tri-star 36
- Tri-star 37 XRC
- Tri-star 38 / 39
- Tri-star 40 LW
- Tri-star 42
- Tri-star 43 MC
- Tri-star 43 XRC
- Tri-star 44 LW
- Tri-star 45
- Tri-star 49
- Tri-star 50
- Tri-star 51 MC
- Tri-star 54
- Tri-star 60 / 63
- Tri-star 65
- Tri-star 80
- TRiAK
- Trikala 19
- Unicorn
- W17
