= Dart 16 =

Sailing catamaran

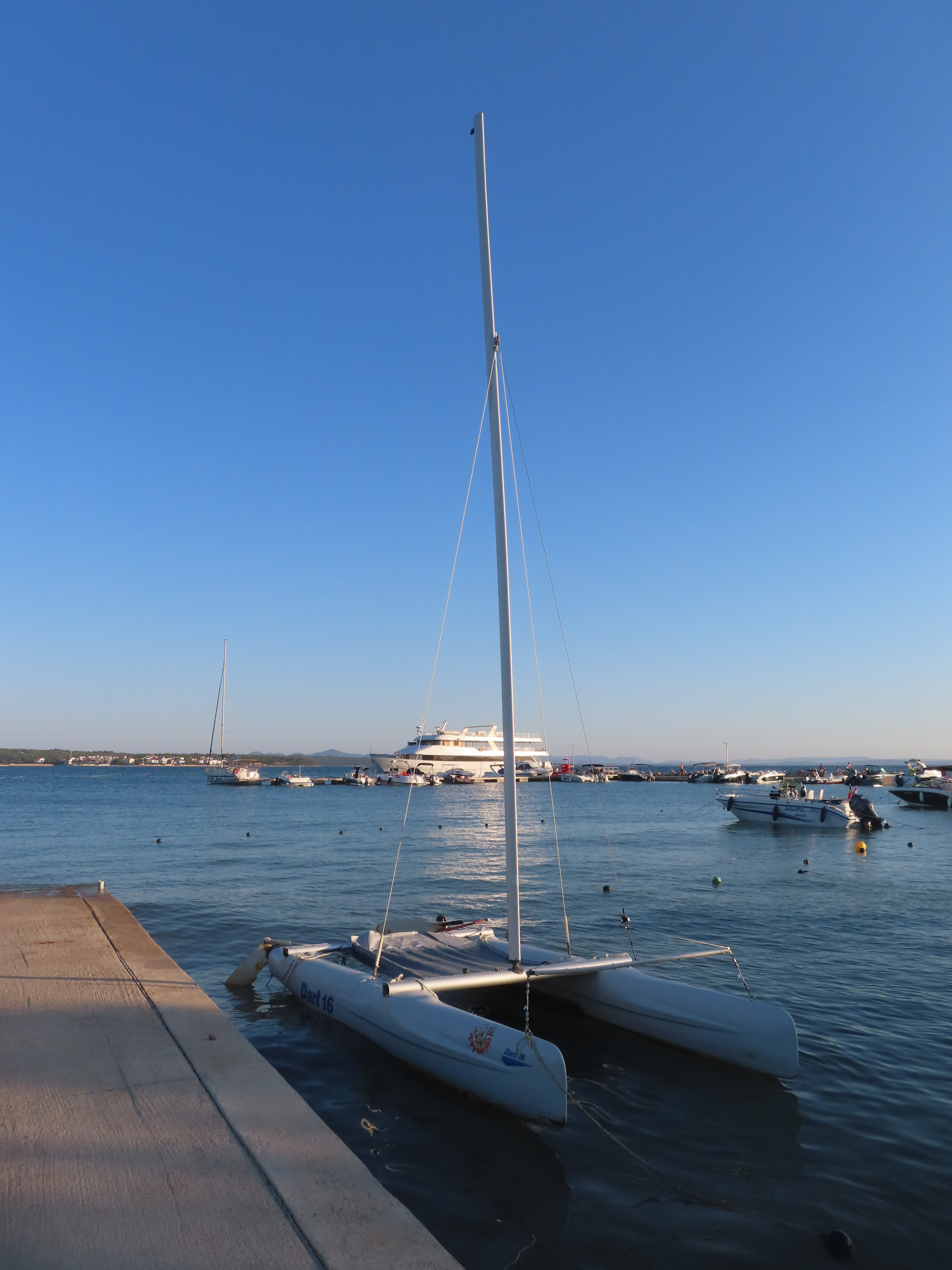

Boat
- Crew: 2

Hull
- Hull weight: 125 kg
- LOA: 4.80 m (15.7 ft)
- Beam: 2.30 m (7 ft 7 in)

Rig
- Mast height: 7.50 m (24.6 ft)

Sails
- Mainsail area: 10.40 m^{2}
- Jib/genoa area: 2.70 m^{2}
- Spinnaker area: 11.53 m^{2}

Racing
- RYA PN: 863

The Dart 16 is a one-design 4.80-m long sailing catamaran. It is designed to be sailed by two people. It races off a Portsmouth Yardstick of 863.

== History ==
The Dart 16 Race was first built in 1997.

== Design ==
The Dart 16 is a modern beach catamaran that is fast, affordable, and seaworthy. Like most Dart catamarans except for the Dart 20 EXP it lacks the main boom, as well as daggerboards, spreaders, and complicated trimming mechanisms.

The lower part of the hulls have skegs typical for a beach catamaran. The most noticeable difference to the popular Dart 18 and Sprint 15 catamarans is that the hulls are made out of Tecrothene, a thermo plastic. This material is very impact- and scratch-resistant, but somewhat heavier and harder to repair than fiberglass. The kick-up rudders are similar to the Hobie 16.

The rigging consists of a rotating aero-dynamically shaped aluminum mast held by a forestay and two shroud wires. There is a trapeze for the crew.

The mainsail does not have a boom. It is fully battened and is controlled by a main sheet with a 6:1 mechanical advantage. The main sheet system has ball-bearing block system with a ratchet and jamming cleat.

The option of a gennaker sail is available.

== See also ==
- List of multihulls
