= Fleury Michon (yacht) =

Fleury Michon was a 75-foot (23 m) waterline length trimaran that was sailed across the Atlantic Ocean in 1987.

== See also ==
- List of multihulls
- Fleury Michon IV
