= Naval Force 3 =

French maritime company

Naval Force 3 is a French sailboat manufacturer based in La Rochelle. They produce a range of boats, including trimarans.

== Trimaran models ==
- Challenge 26 (Drop 26)
- Challenge 30 Trimaran de croisière repliable et transportable de 30 pieds.
- Challenge 33
- Challenge 37
- Challenge 42

== Catamaran models ==
- Twist
- Piana 30
- Piana 30.2
- Piana 37
- Tropic 40
- Tropic 50
- Tropic 60
- Many boat charter model

== Monohull models ==
- Class 2m
- S40
- Boheme 30
- Boheme 33

== See also ==
- List of multihulls
