= Searunner 40 =

Trimaran sailboat

Development
- Designer: Jim Brown and John Marples
- Year: 1960s
- Role: offshore cruising
- Name: Searunner 40

Boat
- Crew: 1-6
- Draft: 3 ft (0.91 m) (hull); 7 ft (2.1 m) (centerboard)

Hull
- Type: Trimaran
- Hull weight: 11,000 lb (5,000 kg)
- LOA: 43 ft (13 m)
- Beam: 24 ft (7.3 m)

Rig
- Rig type: Cutter

Sails
- Total sail area: 1,000 sq ft (93 m^{2})

The Searunner 40 is a trimaran sailboat from the 1960s designed by Jim Brown and John Marples. It is the largest boat in the Searunner series.

== See also ==
- List of multihulls
- Searunner 25
- Searunner 31
- Searunner 34
- Searunner 37
