= Constant Camber 37 =

Trimaran sailboat

Development
- Designer: John Marples
- Year: 1980s
- Name: Constant Camber 37

Boat
- Draft: 10 ft (3.0 m)

Hull
- Type: Trimaran
- LOA: 37 ft (11 m)
- Beam: 23 ft (7.0 m)

The Constant Camber 37 is a trimaran sailboat designed by John Marples in the 1980s.

== See also ==
- List of multihulls
