= Amatasi 27 =

Amatasi 27 is a James Wharram designed fishing catamaran. It is inspired by the traditional amatasi vessels of Samoa, and has been described as a "pioneering environmentally friendly fishing boat".

== Awards ==
Amatasi 27 was designed for the 2010 Design Competition in Classic Boat magazine. The brief was for a fishing boat under 30 ft (9.1 m) that would not need a licence for fishing under sail or oar. Amatasi 27 won first prize.

== See also ==
- List of multihulls
