= Avalon 9 =

Australian sailboat

Development
- Designer: Ray Kendrick
- Location: Australia
- Name: Avalon 9

Boat
- Draft: 0.3 m (0.98 ft) (board up); 1.35 m (4.4 ft) (board down)

Hull
- Type: trimaran
- Construction: marine plywood, epoxy resin, fibreglass, structural aluminium
- Hull weight: 1,200 kg (2,600 lb)
- LOA: 9 m (30 ft)
- LWL: 8.46 m (27.8 ft)

Hull appendages
- Keel: Centreboard

Rig
- Rig type: Fractional Bermuda or Marconi rig with headsails
- Mast height: 12 m (39 ft)

Sails
- Mainsail area: 32.7 m^{2} (352 sq ft)
- Jib/genoa area: 21 m^{2} (230 sq ft) (No. 1 headsail); 15 m^{2} (160 sq ft) (No. 2 headsail)
- Spinnaker area: 50 m^{2} (540 sq ft)

The Avalon 9 trimaran is a trailerable fast cruising and racing sailboat designed by Ray Kendrick. It is a development of the earlier Avalon 8.2 and is similar to the Scarab 8 with more space. It is sold in plan form.

== See also ==
- List of multihulls
