= Constant Camber 3M =

Trimaran sailboat

Development
- Designer: John Marples
- Year: 1980s
- Name: Constant Camber 3M

Boat
- Crew: 1
- Draft: 11 in (0.28 m) (hull only); 2 ft 6 in (0.76 m)

Hull
- Type: trimaran
- Hull weight: 150 lb (68 kg)
- LOA: 10 ft (3.0 m)
- LWL: 10 ft (3.0 m)
- Beam: 8 ft (2.4 m) (overall); 2 ft 2 in (0.66 m) (main hull)

Rig
- Rig type: cat rig
- Mast height: 17 ft 11 in (5.46 m) (mast only); 20 ft (6.1 m) (bridge clearance)

Sails
- Mainsail area: 60 sq ft (5.6 m^{2})
- Total sail area: 130 sq ft (12 m^{2})

Constant Camber 3M is a 10 ft (3.0 m) cat-rigged solo harbor racer/trainer trimaran sailboat designed in the 1980s by John Marples.

== See also ==
- List of multihulls
