= Constant Camber 26 =

Development
- Designer: John Marples
- Year: 1970s
- Name: Constant Camber 26

Boat
- Crew: 2 adults & 2 children
- Draft: 2 ft (0.61 m) (CB up), 3.92 ft (1.19 m) (CB down)

Hull
- Type: Trimaran
- Construction: Multihull; Constant camber cold-molded
- LOA: 26 ft (7.9 m)
- LWL: 23.83 ft (7.26 m)
- Beam: 18 ft (5.5 m) (open), 7.92 ft (2.41 m) (folded)

Rig
- Rig type: sloop

Sails
- Total sail area: 308 sq ft

Constant Camber 26 is a 26 ft (7.9 m) cruising sloop trimaran sailboat designed in the 1970s by John Marples featuring berths for two adults and two children. The constant camber hull is constructed using a single master template to produce each panel, resulting in a design with unchanging curvature, imparting extraordinary strength similar to an eggshell. The panels are laminated using a vacuum bagging technique, as described in Marples' article, "Backyard Vacuum Bagging," written for WoodenBoat Magazine. A unique and appealing feature, aside from its modular construction, is that her cross arms fold up and in, reducing her beam to just under 8 ft (2.4 m), making this trimaran fully trailerable.

== See also ==
- List of multihulls
