= Topcat =

Sailing catamaran boat class

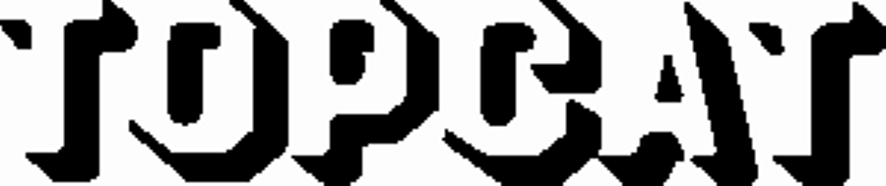
Class Symbol

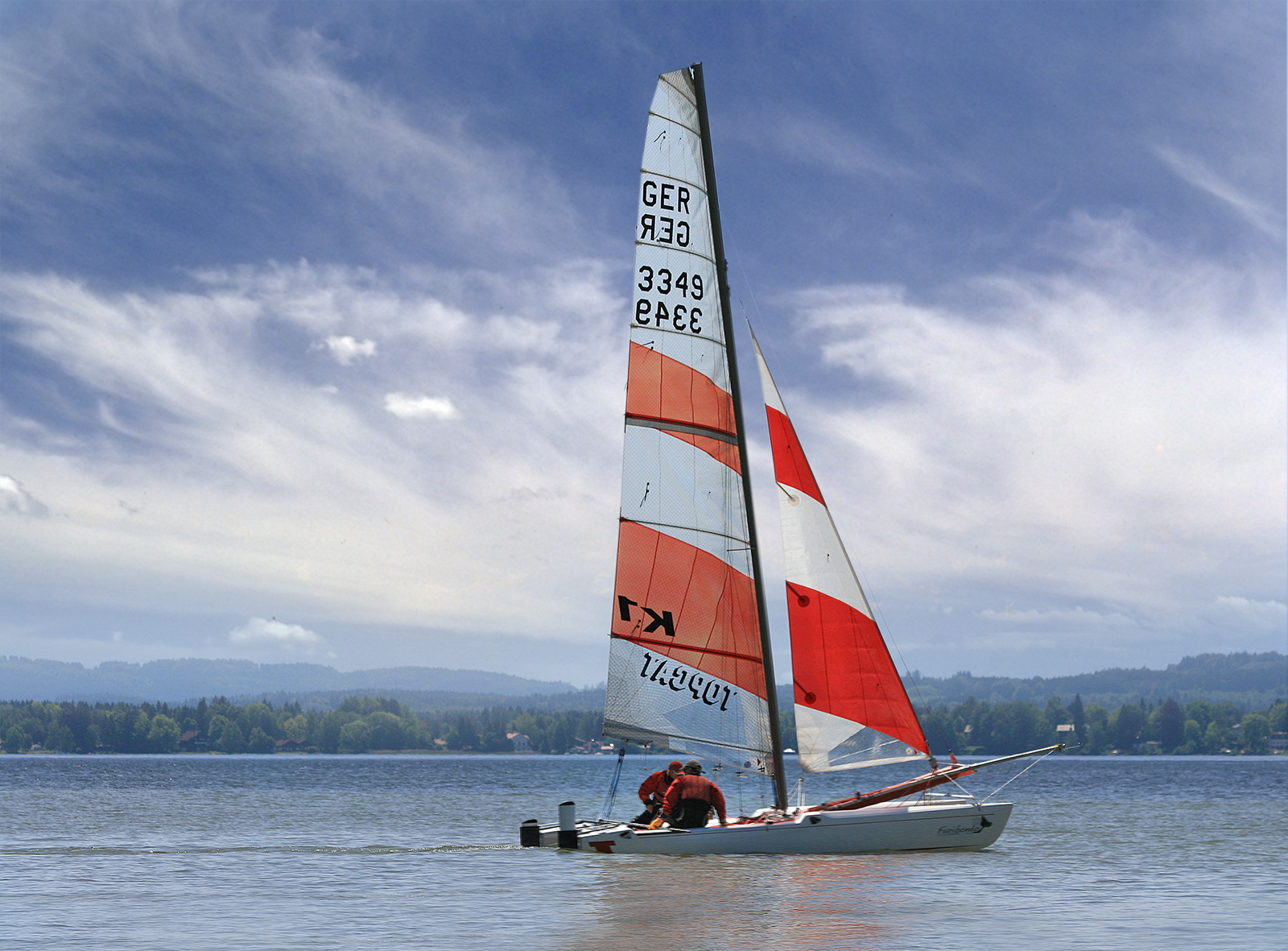
TOPCAT K1 with 18 ft LOA

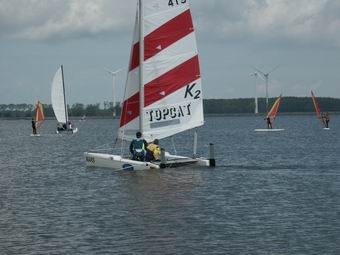
TOPCAT K2 with 17 ft LOA

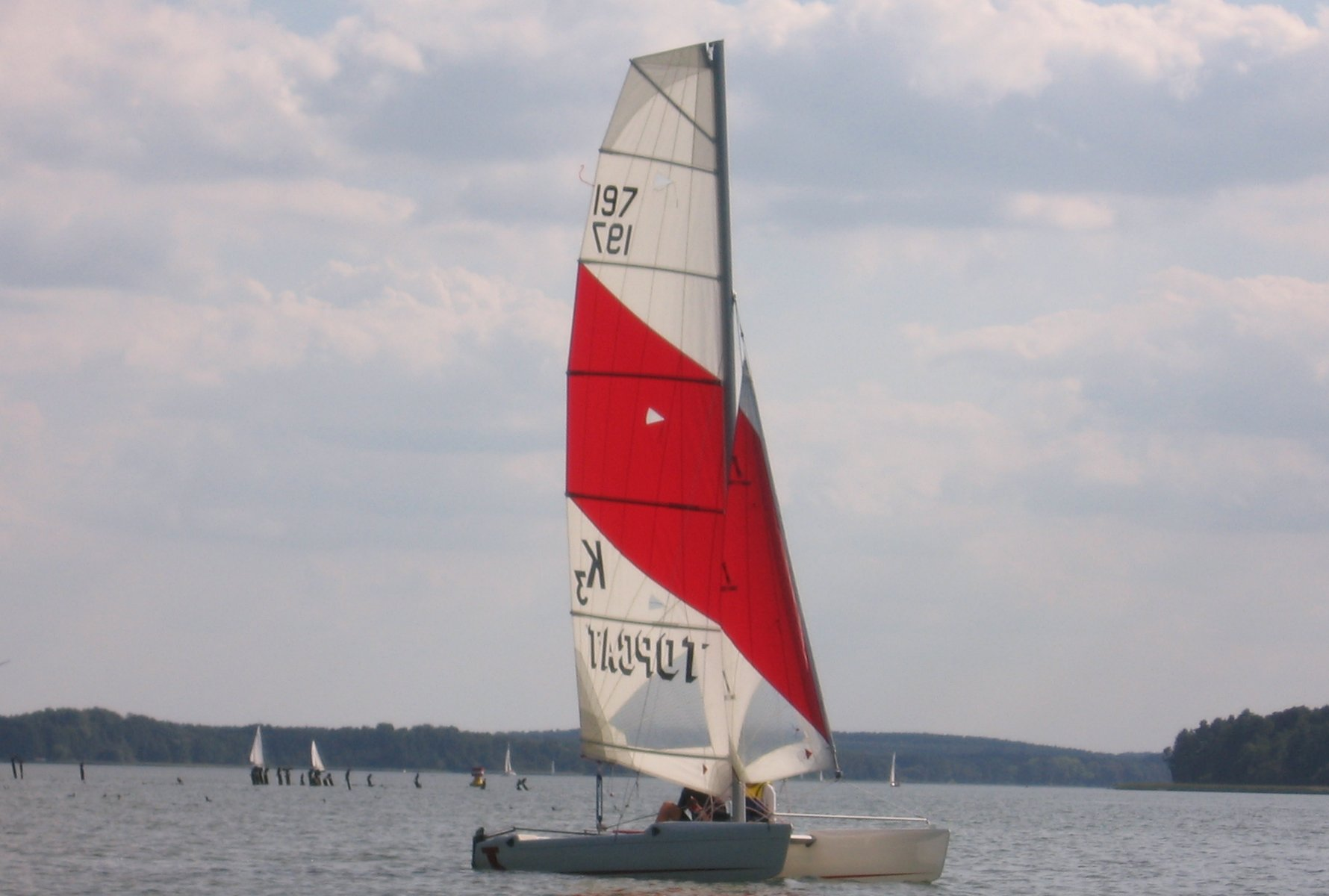
TOPCAT K3 with 16,1 ft LOA

The Topcat is a one-design sailing catamaran boat class which is divided into several boat sizes.

== General ==
The Topcat sailing catamarans are fast, seaworthy, popular, and affordable twin-hull boats ranging in size from 3.60 m (12 ft) to 5.50 m (18 ft). They have world-wide distribution and are differentiated by:

- Production of the hulls in fiberglass
- Hull design without daggerboards
- Assembly without bolts
- Transportable on a trailer (width less than 2.55 m to comply with German traffic laws)
- Transportable on the roof rack of a car
- Simplification of existing designs

== History ==
- 1975 In the mid-70s two German A-Cat sailors, Bernd Breymann und Klaus Enzmann, were unhappy with the complicated transport and assembly of their boats. Klaus Enzmann built a first prototype without daggerboards or rudders, similar to the Spanish "Patin-Vela", but with many of the successful details of the later boats.
- 1976 The new "Kick-up" rudder was added to the prototype. The rudder and other Topcat details were registered as patents.
- 1977 The first Topcat appeared, a 4.80 m long twin-hull boat that was simply plugged together. It had a mast height of 7.00 m, a jib sail of 3.6 m², and a mainsail of 11.2 m².
- 1977-1979 Production of the first 60 Topcats. Capacity was limited by the rented wood shack, so the production of the hulls was moved to Italy, and company headquarters was moved to Gilching, Germany. In 1979 Bernd Breymann and Klaus Enzmann founded TOPCAT GmbH. Worldwide distribution of the boat was supported by onsite training.
- 1981 The first Topcat class association was established. The first Topcat bases were founded at the Lake Garda.
- 1983 Creation of ITCA (International Topcat Class Association). In the same year the first European championship was held in Brenzone, Lake Garda, with 44 boats from 5 countries.
- 1985 The faster and wider 18 ft dual-trapeze "Spitfire" model appeared. More volume was added to the hulls, which was much appreciated by heavier crews. Furthermore, the sails were redesigned, to improve low-wind performance.
- 1993-2000 Development of the modular K-series boats, to increase speed, safety, and handling. The K1, K2, and K3 boats are approved for ITCA racing.
- 2005 The 4.5 model was released, to address the low load-carrying capacity of the entry-level model. The 4.5 was renamed K4 in 2013, and relaunched as a youth-crew model. For young sailors the Topcat Chico model was developed.
- 2005 The Topcat was recognized as an official ISAF racing class. The first world championship was held in September 2005 in Torbole at Lake Garda.

== Design ==
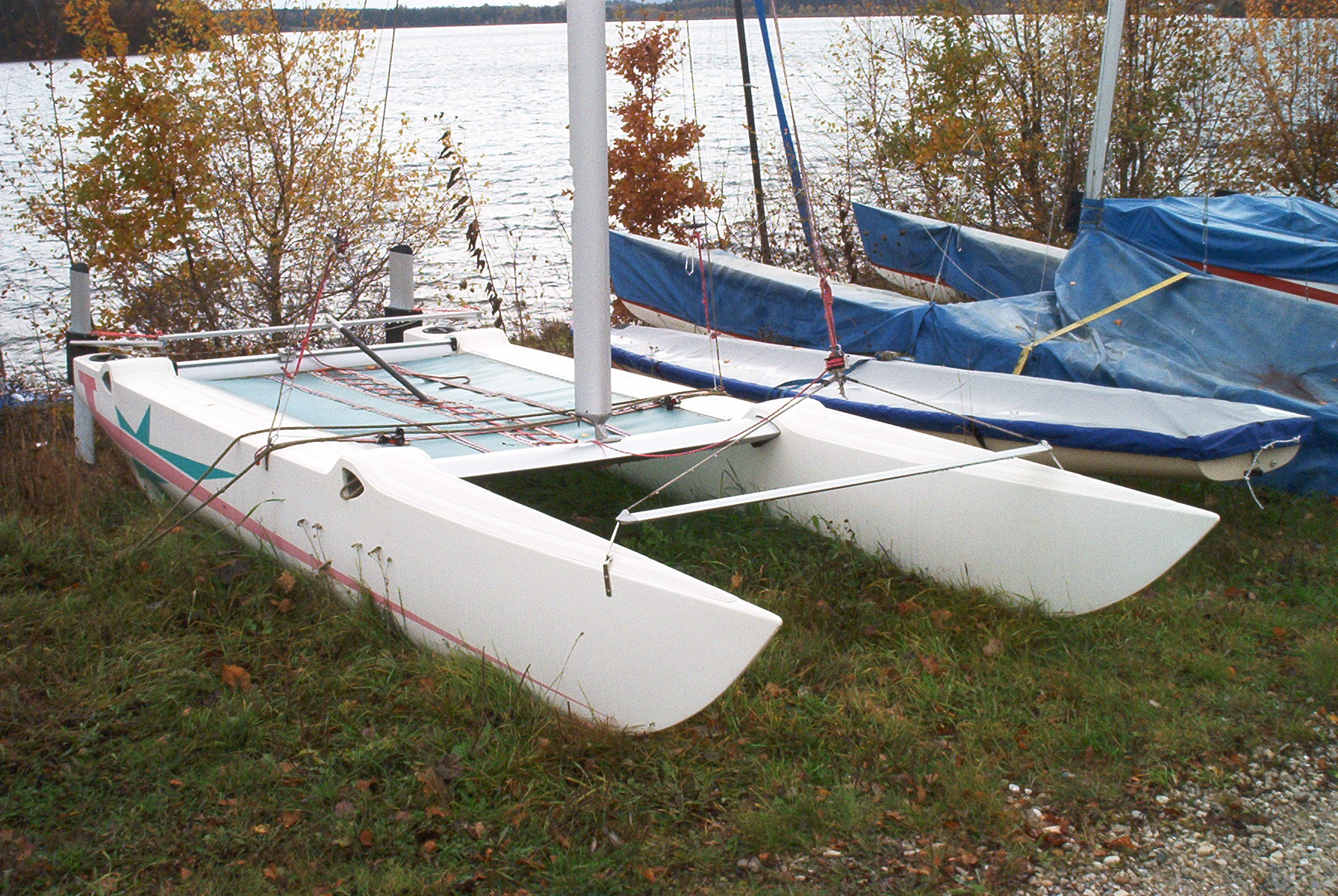

The Topcat lacks the dangerous main boom, as well as daggerboards, spreaders, shroud adjusters, and other complicated trimming mechanisms.

To compensate for the missing daggerboards, the hull profiles are narrow and deep, and form a keel, similar to the Dart 18 and other beach catamarans. This is a compromise between lateral stability, agility in maneuvers, and ability to run up the beach. The material of the hulls is fiberglass, with a strength of a few millimeters on top and on the upper sides. Extra material is applied in areas subject to abrasion and stress forces: at the keel, and where the beams, shrouds, and rudders connect to the hulls. There are special boat versions with a build-up keel for sailing schools and for sailing areas with coral reefs. The surface of the hulls is covered by a gelcoat. Each hull has a dry storage compartment accessible by sealed hatch covers.

The aluminum beams are plugged into the hulls, and the assembly is held together by a tightly laced trampoline. The trampoline consists of two sheets of fabric. Each sheet has a round rubber edge that is threaded into an aluminum rail connected to the hull. The trampoline is laced in the middle, similar to a corset. For safety the front beam contains a line to assist in righting the boat after capsizing.

The rudders do not have to rotate upwards in low water, but slide upwards inside their cheek plates when a retaining line is pulled. The boat can still be steered when the rudders are at the keel line, this allows sailing in areas with low water levels.

The rigging consist of an aero-dynamically shaped aluminum mast held by a forestay and two shroud wires. The mast sits on top of a round knob riveted to the front beam, and rotates freely. The K1 and Spitfire models have diamond spreaders to stabilize the mast. Some masts can be divided into two parts for easier transportation. There is a trapeze for the crew and/or helmsman.

- The mainsail does not have a boom, and has full battens. The sail can be adjusted to wind conditions by a cunningham, and is connected to the mast top by a hook and latch system. The sail is controlled by a main sheet tackle with 7:1 or 8:1 mechanical advantage. The lower main sheet block has a cam cleat and an optional ratchet, and is connected to a traveller that runs the full length of the beam.
- The jib is controlled by a jib sheet that runs through a block and cleat with a 2:1 mechanical advantage. Jib traveller and ratchet blocks are optional. A jib furling system is standard.
- A gennaker or reacher sail can be added to the K1, K2, K3 and K4 models, and allows a considerable speed increase when sailing downwind.
- The blocks in the racing versions are by Harken.

There are three sail types available:

- Dacron Classic (Beginner)
- Dacron Streamcut (Advanced)^{1}
- PenTex foil (Racing)^{1}

The Streamcut and PenTex sails have a larger sail area, and an almost rectangular shape.

^{1} approved for racing by ITCA

== Model overview and technical specifications ==
Topcat model overview 1977 to 2015
Series	F1 / F2	Spitfire 2.3 / 2.5	K1	K2	K3	K4 / 4.5	Chico
Period	1977-2005	1985 -1993	since 1993	since 1995	since 1999	since 2005	since 2005
LOA	4.80 m	5.48 m	5.48 m	5.17 m	4.92 m	4.50m	3.60 m
LOA	15.7 ft	18.0 ft	18.0 ft	17.0 ft	16.1 ft	14.8 ft	11.8 ft
BOA	2.00 m	2.50 m	2.50 m	2.44 m	2.21 m	2.21 m	1.98m
Mast height	7.00 m	9.20 m	9.15 m	8.20 m	7.60 m	7,00 m	5,76 m
Weight	115 kg	180 kg	170 kg	155 kg	138 kg	115 kg	80 kg
Sail area Mainsail	11.2 m^{2}	16.7 m^{2}	16.7 m^{2}	15.9 m^{2}	14.9 m^{2}	11,0 m^{2}	5,8 m^{2}
Sail area Jib	3.6 m^{2}	5.4 m^{2}	5.4 m^{2}	4.2 m^{2}	3.2 m^{2}	2.5 m^{2}	2.1 m^{2}
Sail area Gennaker	--.- m^{2}	--.- m^{2}	18.8 m^{2}	16.3 m^{2}	16.3 m^{2}	12.0 m^{2}	--.- m^{2}
Trapeze	1	2	2	2	1	1	1
Crew	1/2	2	2	1/2	1/2	1/2	2 (kids)
DPN	-	-	88	-	75	-	-

- K1 units build: 2920 total, 20 in 2013

== See also ==
- List of multihulls
