= Neel 45 =

Cruising trimaran boat

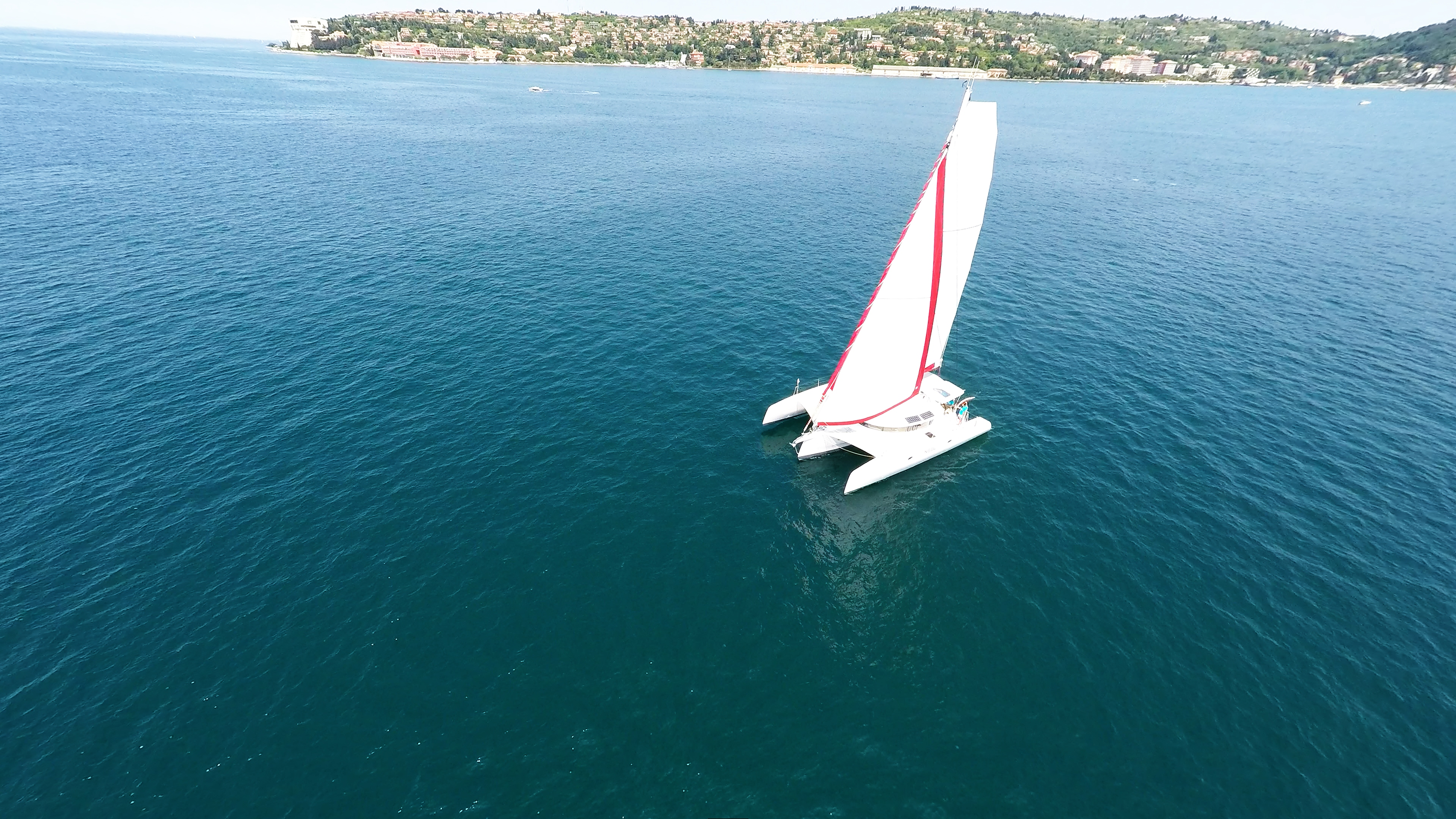
- A Neel 45 sailing in Slovenia. (2015)

Development
- Designer: Eric Bruneel (conception) and Joubert-Nivelt (design)
- Location: La Rochelle, France
- Year: 2011
- Name: Neel 45

Boat
- Draft: 4 ft (1.2 m)

Hull
- Type: Cruising trimaran
- Construction: Glass / isophthalic polyester resin / closed-cell foam and honeycomb PVC sandwich
- Hull weight: 6,500 kg (14,300 lb) (light); 9,000 kg (20,000 lb) (full load)
- LOA: 44 ft (13 m)
- Beam: 28 ft (8.5 m)

Rig
- Rig type: Fractional Bermuda or Marconi rig with genoa
- Mast height: 63 ft (19 m)

Sails
- Mainsail area: 645 sq ft (59.9 m^{2})
- Jib/genoa area: 65 sq ft (6.0 m^{2})
- Spinnaker area: 495 sq ft (46.0 m^{2})

Neel 45 is a cruising trimaran designed by Joubert-Nivelt and produced by Neel Trimarans.

== Reception ==
The boat was selected among the Best Boats of 2013 by Sail Magazine and praised for its speed, comfort, construction quality and ergonomics, but criticized for its learning curve and a need for power winches. It was also praised by Cruising World, being awarded 'Most Innovative' for 2013 and garnering compliments for its interior design, performance and detailing.

== See also ==
- List of multihulls
- Trimaran
