= Formula Tag =

Formula Tag was a 74-foot waterline length catamaran that was sailed across the Atlantic Ocean in 1984.

== See also ==
- List of multihulls
