= Jet Services V =

Jet Services V was a 75-foot waterline length catamaran that was sailed across the Atlantic Ocean in 1988 and 1990.

== See also ==
- List of multihulls
- Jet Services II
