= Sidinox =

Sidinox was a 52-foot waterline length proa that was sailed across the Atlantic Ocean in 1981.

== See also ==
- List of multihulls
