= Brady catamarans =

A Brady 45 sailing catamaran
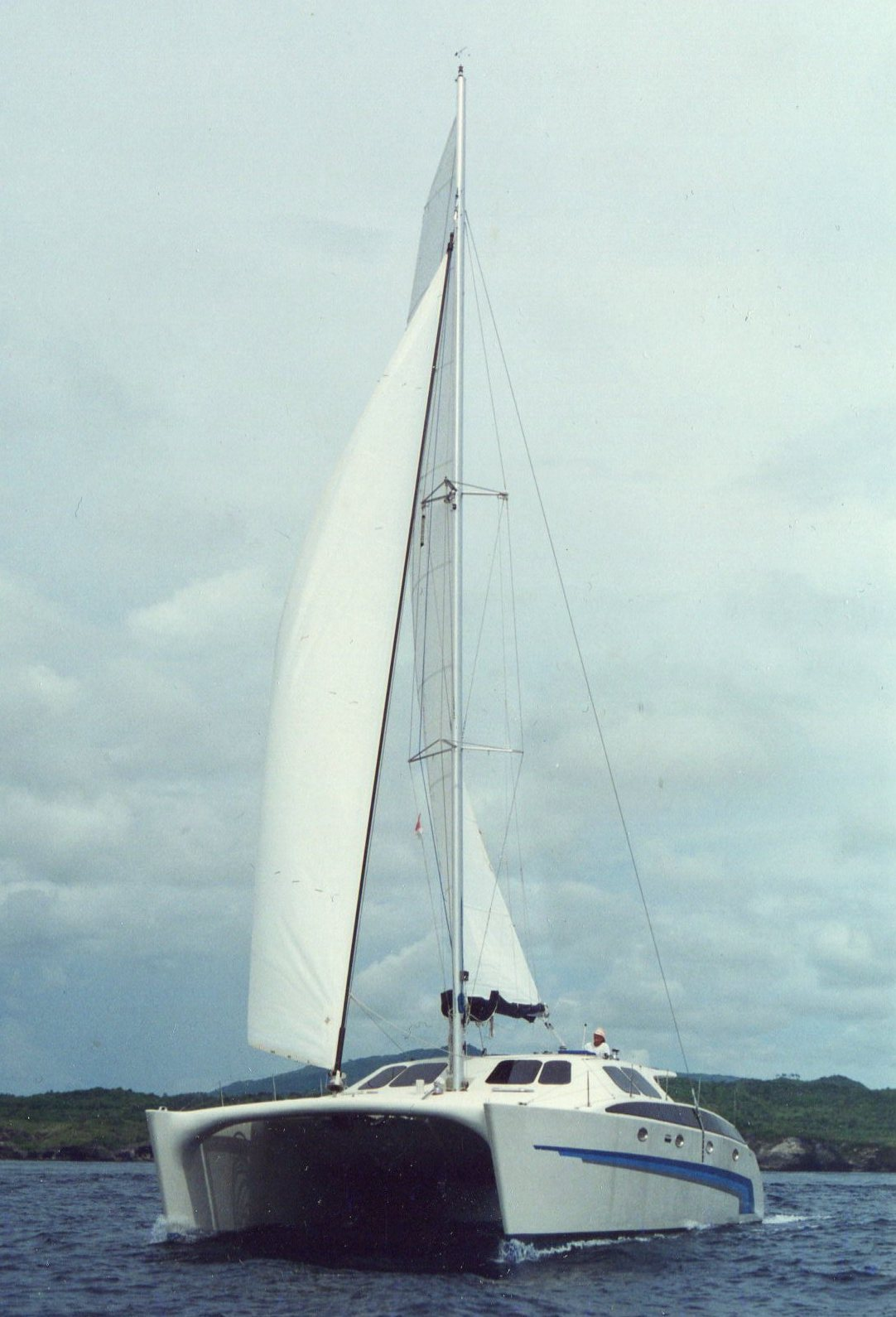
- Founded: 1976
- Founder: Peter Brady
- Headquarters: Brisbane, Australia
- Products: Catamarans

Brady catamarans are twin-hulled boats that are designed by Peter Brady, a New Zealand designer. Brady originally designed sailing cats, motorsailers and power cats, but for the last 20 years the firm (now called Pathfinder Powercats) has specialised in powered catamarans exclusively.

== Construction ==
Brady catamarans are either constructed at Brady's boatyard in Brisbane Australia, or plans-built by third-party constructors for private owners. Brady catamarans tend to be built in small numbers or even as one-offs, so the firm has adopted "strip-plank" as the optimum construction method. Strip-build involves attaching strips of cedar onto formers, the strips themselves being glued edge-on with epoxy. The completed wooden monococque is then covered with fiberglass matting and epoxy resin. This method is very suitable for low-volume construction, avoiding the need to build a female mould; it is simpler and cheaper to manufacture a plywood jig that may be discarded afterwards.

== Brady catamaran models ==
Brady catamaran models include:

- Brady 45 - sailing yacht with twin 40 hp Yanmar auxiliary engines.
- Brady 52 "Passagemaker" - a motorsailer with a modest-area staysail schooner rig and twin Perkins 95 hp main engines.
- Brady 57 "Pathfinder pilothouse 17.4" - a luxury 57' cruising motoryacht.
- Brady Pathfinder M Series - a range of displaning power catamarans between 41 and 49 ft.
- Brady Powercats - various models for leisure, fishing, and business use.

== See also ==
- List of multihulls
- Boat building
