= Multi 23 =

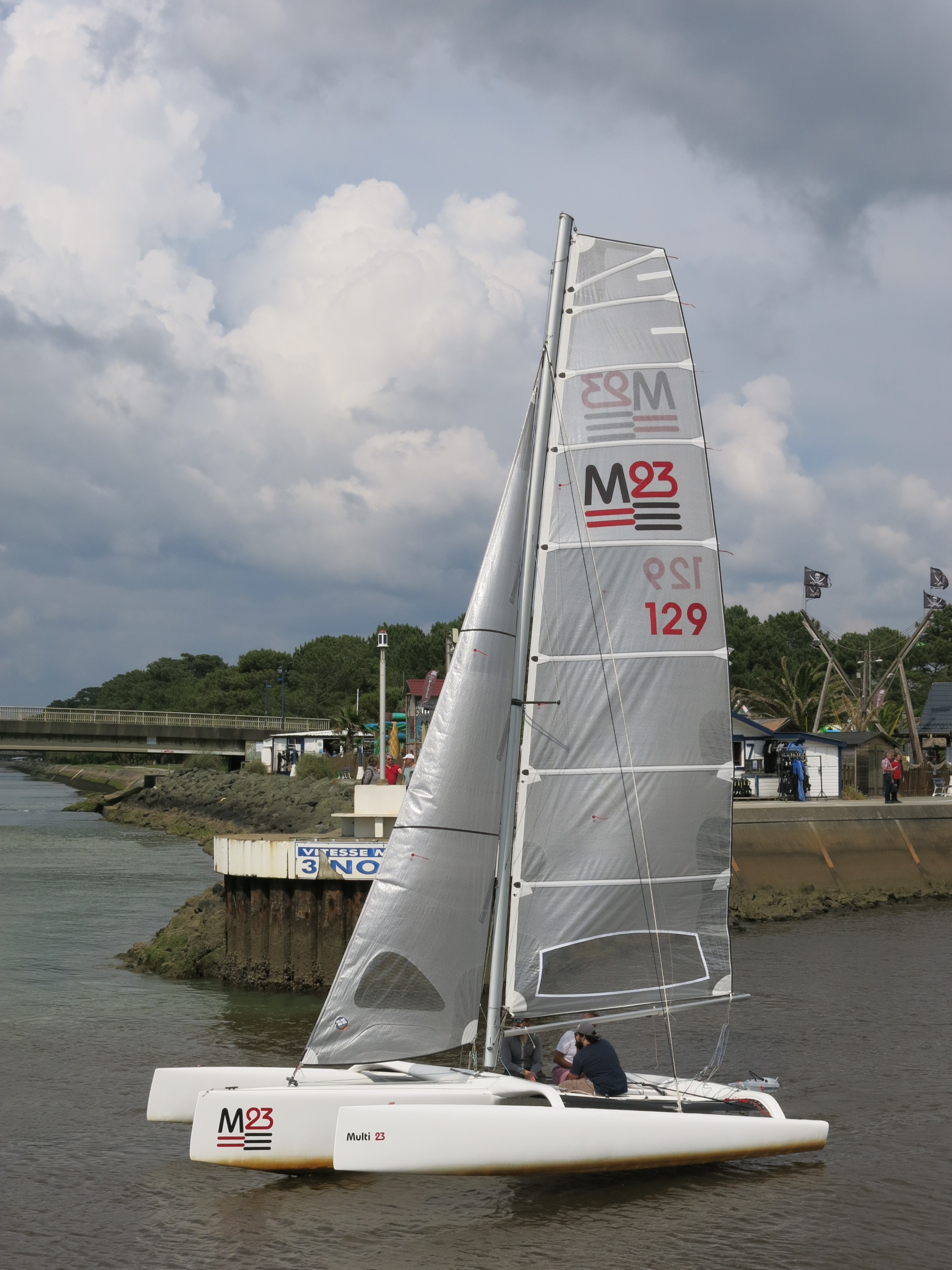
- Multi 23 in the marina of Capbreton (France)

Development
- Designer: VPLP
- Year: 2007
- Builder: Torpen International Boats
- Name: Multi 23

Hull
- Type: Open trimaran
- Construction: Vinylester resin, fiberglass, carbon fiber, PVC, aluminium rotating wing-mast
- Hull weight: 400 kg (880 lb)
- LOA: 6.72 m (22.0 ft)
- Beam: 4.8 m (16 ft)

Hull appendages
- Keel: kick-up centreboard

Rig
- Rig type: Fractional Bermuda or Marconi rig with gennaker/asymmetric spinnaker
- Mast height: 10.8 m (35 ft)

Sails
- Mainsail area: 22.02 m^{2} (237.0 sq ft)
- Jib/genoa area: 8.06 m^{2} (86.8 sq ft)
- Spinnaker area: 40.72 m^{2} (438.3 sq ft)

Multi 23 is a trimaran designed by VPLP and manufactured by Torpen International Boats in Qingdao, Shandong province, China.

== See also ==
- List of multihulls
- Torpen International Boats
- VPLP
