= Centaurus II =

Development
- Designer: E. N. Maryanov
- Location: Kirov Plant yacht club, Strelna, St. Petersburg, Russia
- Year: 1994
- Role: cruising catamaran
- Name: Centaurus II

Boat
- Crew: 5
- Draft: 0.5 m (1.6 ft) (hulls); 3.5 m (11 ft) (centerboards); 1.3 m (4.3 ft) (steering boards)

Hull
- Type: Catamaran
- Construction: pine, ash, larch, plywood, fiberglass
- Hull weight: 16,000 kg (35,000 lb)
- LOA: 16.5 m (54 ft)
- LWL: 15.5 m (51 ft)
- Beam: 10 m (33 ft)

Hull appendages
- Keel: centerboards

Rig
- Rig type: Bermuda or Marconi rigged sloop
- Mast height: 24 m (79 ft) (from water level)

Sails
- Mainsail area: 148 m^{2} (1,590 sq ft)

Centaurus II is a cruising catamaran designed by E.N. Maryanov in 1994.

== See also ==
- List of multihulls
