= Wētā Trimaran =

Sailing boat developed in New Zealand

- Class symbol

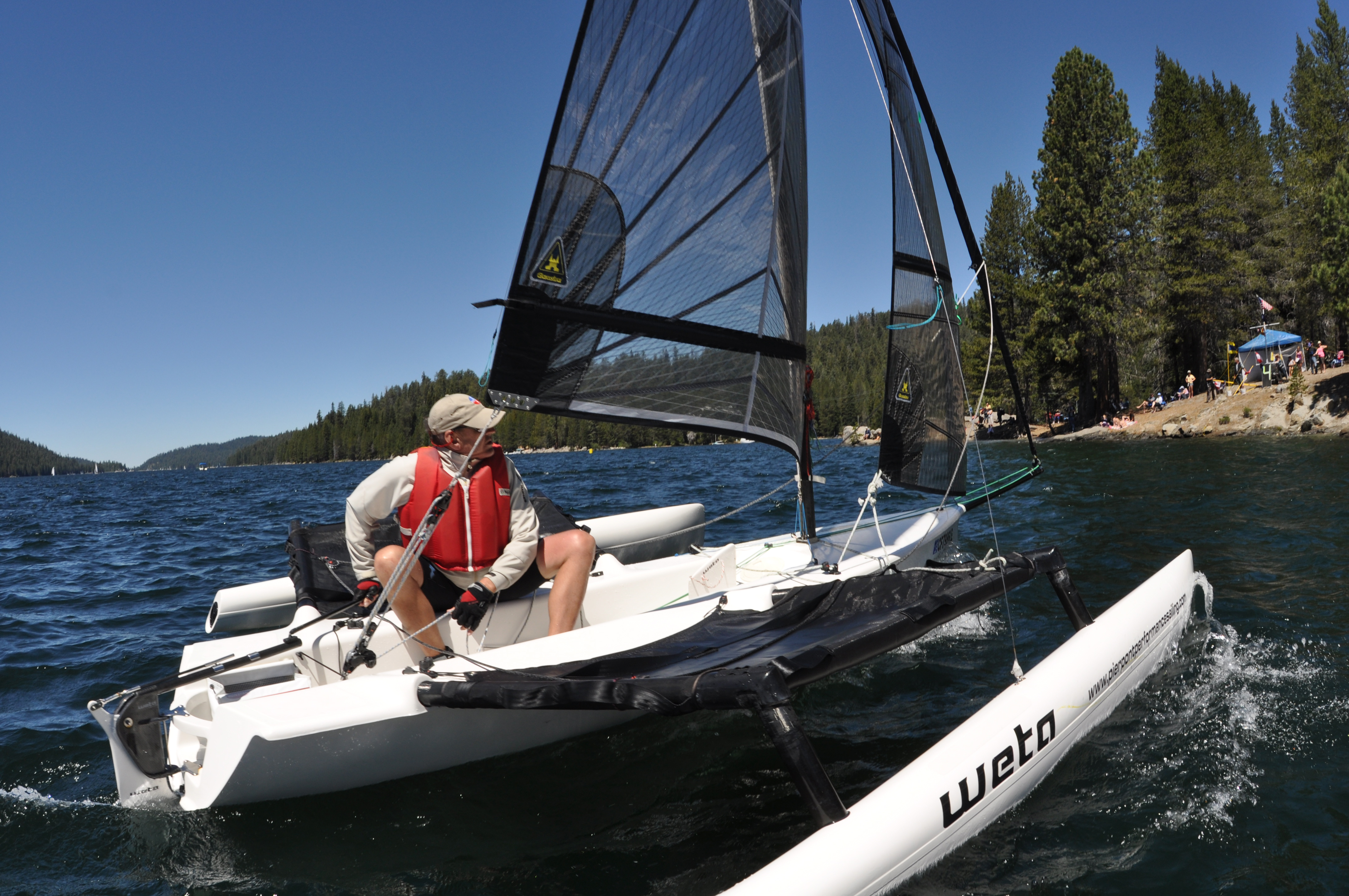
- Weta racing in the High Sierra Regatta

Development
- Designer: Roger and Chris Kitchen, Tim Clissold
- Location: Auckland, New Zealand
- Year: 2006
- Design: One-design
- Name: Wētā Trimaran

Boat
- Crew: 1–3 adults / max 240 kg (530 lb)

Hull
- Type: Open trimaran
- Construction: Carbon fiber, fiberglass and foam
- Hull weight: Approx. 120 kg (260 lb) (fully rigged)
- LOA: 4.4 m (14 ft)
- Beam: 3.5 m (11 ft) (rigged); 1.7 m (5.6 ft) (on trailer)

Hull appendages
- Keel: Daggerboard

Rig
- Rig type: Fractional Bermuda or Marconi rig with gennaker
- Mast height: 6.6 m (22 ft) → 6.6 m (22 ft)

Sails
- Mainsail area: 9.3 m^{2} (100 sq ft) (Sq. Top)
- Jib/genoa area: 3.2 m^{2} (34 sq ft)
- Spinnaker area: 8 m^{2} (86 sq ft)
- Upwind sail area: 20.5 m^{2} (221 sq ft) (Square Top)

Racing
- D-PN: 83 for 1-up and 89 for 2-up
- RYA PN: 950

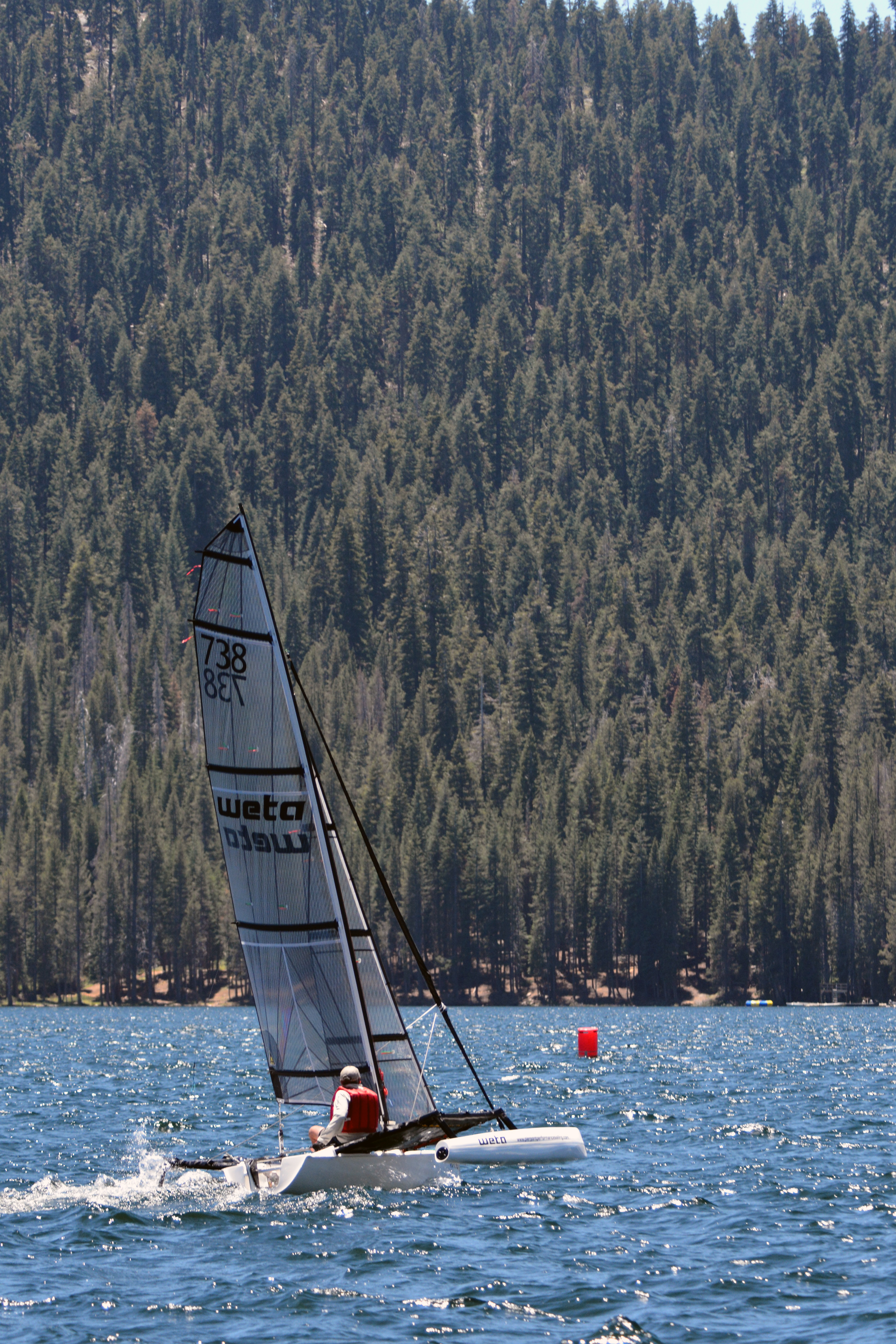
Wētā racing on Huntington Lake California High Serra Regatta

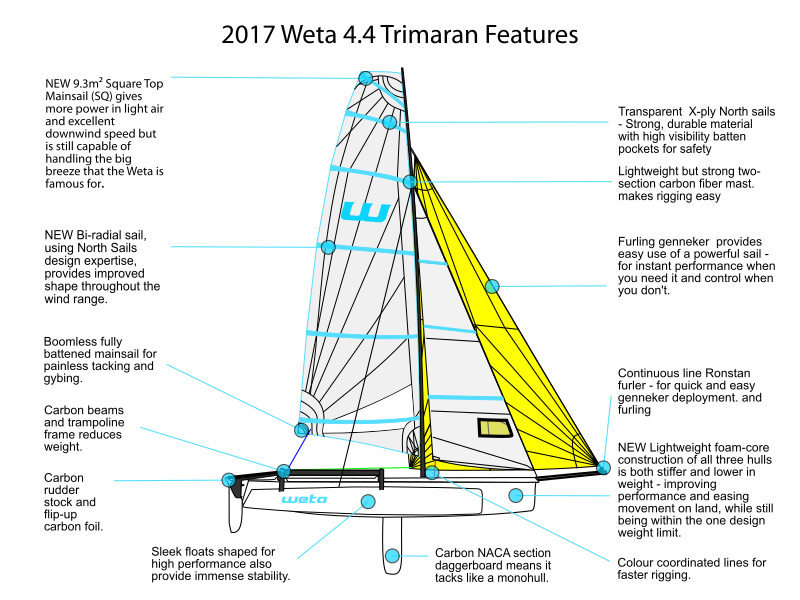
2017 Wētā features

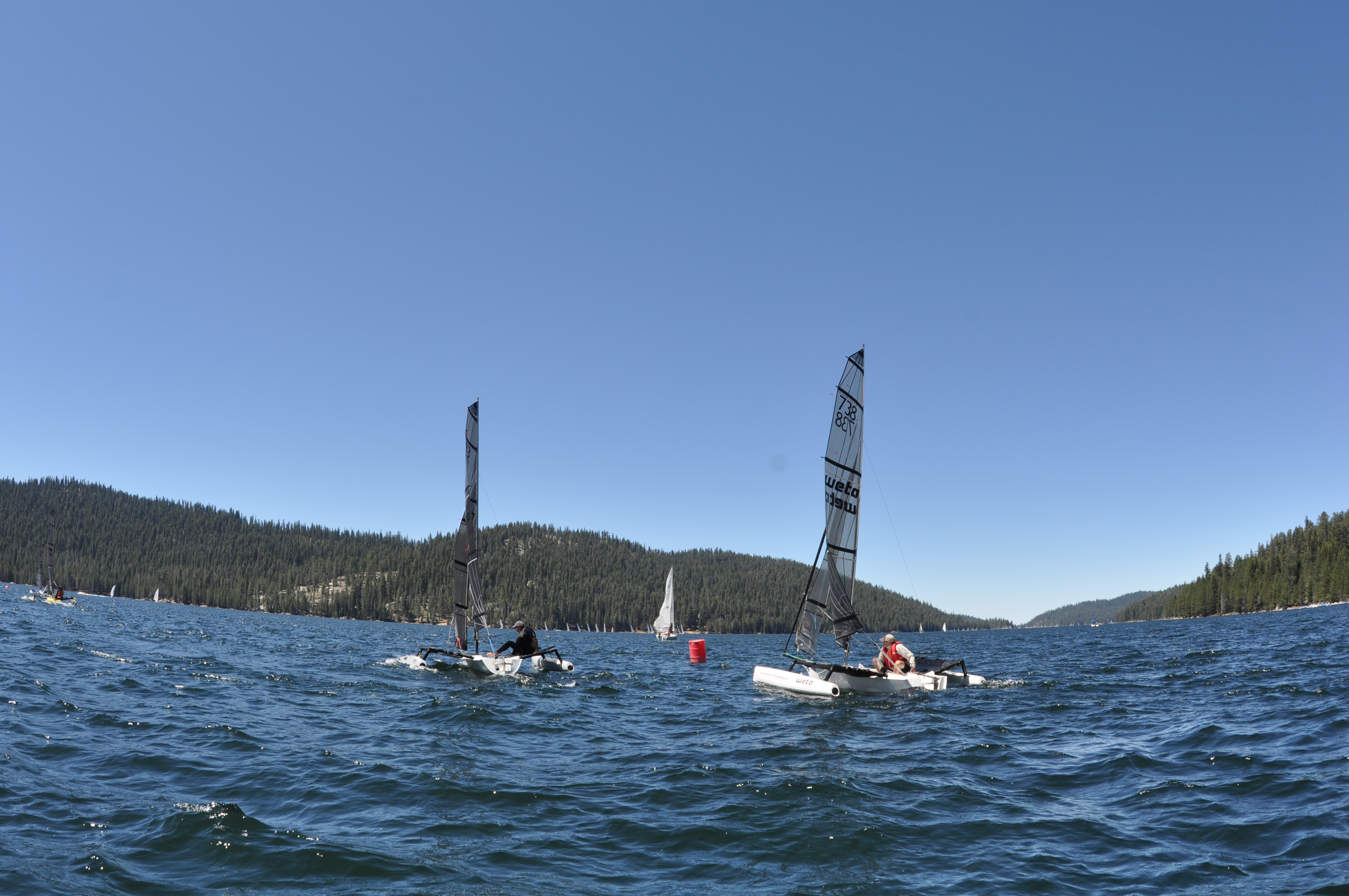

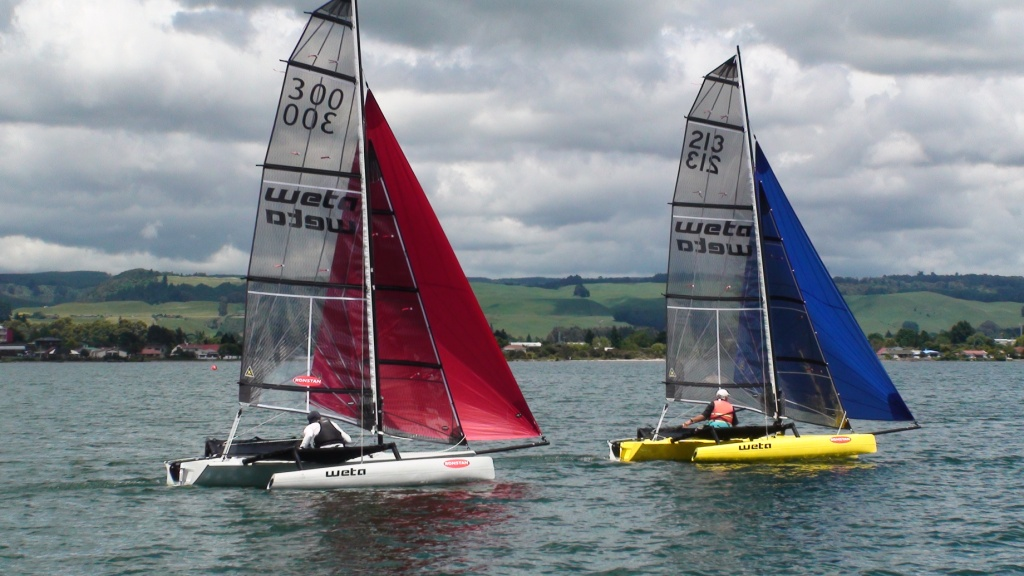

The Wētā 4.4 Trimaran is a 4.4-metre (14-foot) sailing dinghy conceived and developed in New Zealand from 2001 to 2006 by Roger and Chris Kitchen and others with original drawings by TC Design's Tim Clissold.

== Design ==
The boat is constructed from fibreglass and carbon fibre, and is popular as a racing boat or for recreational sailing. It has added stability and righting moment from the trimaran amas or floats.

== Recognition ==
The Wētā Trimaran is recognized as one design class by Yachting New Zealand, the French Sailing Federation, and the Royal Yachting Association in the UK. It has been approved for the Paralympics and World Masters Games.

== Awards ==
In 2010 the Wētā Trimaran was awarded Boat of the Year by Sailing World magazine.

== Builds ==
There are two distinct builds of the Wētā Trimaran, the 'original build' and the '2015 Wētā' which was created from a new mold and included (mostly internal) hull revisions. In April 2017, Wētā announced the availability of a foam-core Wētā which as well as being stiffer is right on the minimum weight of 120 kg in the class rules.

=== Original build ===
Early prototypes were produced in New Zealand but from 2006 to 2014 the 'original build' was manufactured in China for Wētā Marine and sold internationally. In 2020, 1300+ boats have been sold to date with the largest fleets in France and the USA. The original sails were manufactured by Dutch windsurfing sail-maker, Gaastra.

The design evolved over time:

- Color changes (Most boats were produced to four RAL color codes: Red (3020), Yellow (1018), Green (6018), Light Grey (7035). Some very early boats featured alternative red and yellow hues). Current 2020 colours are White, Grey, Blue, Yellow or Orange.
- Three rudders
- New deeper daggerboard
- Mylar sails (dacron optional)
- Minor modifications to forestay tack fitting
- Optional furling jib
- Optional mainsails:
  - Small training mainsail
  - Heavy weather mainsail
  - 'Resort' mainsail (Dacron)

=== 2015 Wētā ===
In 2014 the new 2015 Wētā was announced with a switch to a new manufacturer, Xtreme Sailing Products (XSP), based in Singapore (with the factory in nearby Batam, Indonesia). XSP produced a new mould and made structural and cosmetic improvements, including:

- Deck (screecher furler cleat on cockpit side, swaged stays, Liros ropes and optional hiking strap, enhanced grip, new raised foredeck detail for enhanced strength and durability)
- Floats (Change to seamless construction and removal of rear lip. Switch to Nairn hatches.)
- Sails (Switch of manufacturer to North Sails)
- Centrecase (precision fit via nylon pile)
- Trampoline (improved alignment via custom carbon pads)
- Rudder bar and gudgeons (strength and durability enhancement)

In September 2014 the first of the new '2015 Wētā' build were shipped to customers in the US.

=== 2017 Foam Core Wētā and Square Top Sail ===
In April 2017, Wētā announced the availability of a foam-core hull (right on the class weight limit of 120 kg) and bi-radial cut 9.3 m$^2$ square top mainsail (compared to the original Pin-head 8.3 m$^2$ mainsail. Nearly all Wētā built since 2018 have been foam core and the Square Top sail has been adopted as the standard sail for racing in most regions.

=== 2020 Self-tacking jib kit ===
In February 2020, Wētā announced the availability of a Self-Tacking Jib kit designed to be retrofitted to existing hulls or as an addition to new boats. The kit allows tacking without adjusting the jib sheets and includes a slightly smaller jib which is 3.0sqm. Around 6% less sail area than the standard jib at 3.2sqm.

=== 2020 Twin Tiller Extension kit ===
In August 2020, a twin tiller extension kit was announced. The kit consists of a second tiller extension, bolts to attach both extensions to the tiller and a shock-cord and ring system to prevent the inactive tiller dragging in the water. The benefit is that you no longer have to pass the tiller around the stern when tacking.

=== 2022 Branding Revision ===
In April 2022, the branding was changed from "Weta: Fun. Fast. Easy" to "Wētā: Life's Better". The addition of the macrons was made to properly align with the Māori language definition.

== Performance ==
- Top recorded speed (best 10-second average): 21.4 kn (24.63 MPH) by Tom Kirkman, USA
- Rigging time: 20 minutes
- PYS DP-N is 83 for 1-up and 89 for 2-up

== See also ==
- List of multihulls
