= Venta (catamaran) =

Development
- Location: Latvia
- Year: 1973
- Role: racer
- Name: Venta

Hull
- Type: catamaran
- LOA: 11 m (36 ft)
- Beam: 7 m (23 ft)

Sails
- Total sail area: 80 m^{2} (860 sq ft)

Venta was a catamaran designed in Latvia in 1973. At the time it was considered "comfortable, secure, moderately priced and faster than the best single hull yachts", became popular and won all the local races.

== See also ==
- List of multihulls
