= Kriter IV =

- Designer(s): Xavier Joubert
- Builder: Constructions Mécaniques de Normandie; Cherbourg, France
- Launched: 1978

Specifications
- Length: 23 m (75 ft) (LOA)

Kriter IV was a 66-foot waterline length trimaran which was sailed across the Atlantic Ocean in 1979. It was designed entirely of aluminum by Xavier Joubert as an extension of Eric Tabarly's Manureva and constructed by the French shipyard Constructions Mécaniques de Normandie (CMN) for Olivier de Kersauson.

It competed in the Route du Rhum in 1978, finishing fourth and achieving speeds of over 30 knots (55.56 kilometres (34.52 miles) per hour).

== See also ==
- List of multihulls
