= Lagoon 470 =

Sailboat class

Development
- Designer: Van Peteghem/Lauriot-Prevost
- Location: France
- Year: 1998
- No. built: 51
- Builders: Jeanneau; Construction Navale Bordeaux; Lagoon Catamaran
- Role: Cruiser
- Name: Lagoon 470

Boat
- Displacement: 20,569 lb (9,330 kg)
- Draft: 4.43 ft (1.35 m)

Hull
- Type: multihull
- Construction: fiberglass
- LOA: 47.57 ft (14.50 m)
- LWL: 44.95 ft (13.70 m)
- Beam: 25.92 ft (7.90 m)
- Engine: Twin Yanmar diesel engines total of 80 hp (60 kW)

Hull appendages
- Keel: twin keels
- Ballast: none
- Rudder: twin rudders

Rig
- Rig type: Bermuda rig

Sails
- Sailplan: fractional rigged sloop
- Mainsail area: 807 sq ft (75.0 m^{2})
- Jib/genoa area: 485 sq ft (45.1 m^{2})
- Total sail area: 1,183.00 sq ft (109.904 m^{2})

The Lagoon 470 is a French catamaran sailboat that was designed by Van Peteghem/Lauriot-Prevost as a cruiser and yacht charter boat and first built in 1998.

The boat replaced the Lagoon 47 in the company product line.

== Production ==
The design was built by Jeanneau's Lagoon catamaran division, later part of Construction Navale Bordeaux (CNB) and Groupe Beneteau in France. Production ran from 1998 to 2005, with 51 boats completed.

== Design ==
The Lagoon 470 is a recreational catamaran, built predominantly of vinylester fiberglass sandwich, with wood trim. It has a fractional sloop rig, with a deck-stepped mast and aluminum spars. The hulls have raked stems, reverse transoms with steps, twin rudders controlled by a wheel and twin keels. It displaces 20,569 lb (9,330 kg).

The boat has a draft of 4.43 ft (1.35 m) with the standard twin keels.

The boat is fitted with twin Yanmar diesel engines and saildrives, producing a 40 hp (30 kW) each or optional 54 hp (40 kW) for docking and maneuvering. The fuel tank holds 127 U.S. gallons (480 L; 106 imp gal) and the fresh water tank has a capacity of 158 U.S. gallons (600 L; 132 imp gal).

For the yacht charter role the boat may be equipped with four cabins, each with its own head. For personal use the number of heads are reduced to three. The central salon has a table and seating for eight to ten people, plus a navigation station and a galley to port.

The design has a hull speed of 8.98 kn (16.63 km/h).

== Operational history ==
In a 2003 Cruising World review, Ralph Naranjo wrote, "designers Marc Van Peteghem and Vincent Lauriot Prévost took the strengths and weaknesses of the older Lagoon 47 and created a multifaceted multihull, ready to play the role of a liveaboard, charter boat, or long-distance cruiser. The transition from the Lagoon 47 to the Lagoon 470 entailed a major hull and deck redesign and a new approach to the use of space below, resulting in a truly new boat."

== See also ==
- List of multihulls
- List of sailing boat types
