= Royale II =

Royale II was an 80-foot waterline length catamaran that was sailed across the Atlantic Ocean in 1986.

== See also ==
- List of multihulls
