= Brittany Ferries (trimaran) =

Ship

Brittany Ferries was a 60-foot waterline length trimaran that was sailed across the Atlantic Ocean in 1981.

== See also ==
- List of multihulls
