= Ray Kendrick =

Australian multihull sailboat designer

Ray Kendrick is an Australian multihull sailboat designer. He works with partner Fran Sneesby as Team Scarab. Previously, he worked under the Kendrick Designs entity.

== Designs ==
- Aussie
- Avalon 8.2
- Avalon 9
- Scarab 8
- Scarab 16
- Scarab 18
- Scarab 22
- Scarab 32
- Scarab 350
- Scarab 650
- Scarab 670
