= FMV (catamaran) =

FMV was a 60-foot waterline length catamaran that was sailed across the Atlantic Ocean in 1981.

== See also ==
- List of multihulls
