= Original (catamaran) =

19th century catamaran

Original was a catamaran built by Englishman Mayflower Crisp in Rangoon, Burma in the early 19th century.

Being taught by experience in the brig Bucephalus, which had a great rise of floor, that the form of the floor did not govern velocity, I built an experimental schooner called the "Original," on the double canoe or fallen floor principle, length 45 feet, breadth 9 feet, depth forward 5 feet, after 6 feet, to sail 3 feet by the stern. She proved to be a fast sailing fine sea boat; she traded during the S. W. monsoon between Rangoon and Tenasserim Provinces for several years.

— Mayflower Crisp

== See also ==
- List of multihulls
- Catamaran
