= Aldis Eglājs =

Latvian sailboat designer

Aldis Eglājs (born 6 February 1936 in Riga) is a Latvian multihull sailboat designer.

== Designs ==
=== Catamarans ===
- Centaurus 35
- Centaurus 38

=== Trimarans ===
- Catri 27
- Catri 26
- Catri 25 (2014)
- Catri 24
- Catri 23

== See also ==
- Catrigroup
