= Searunner 25 =

Trimaran sailboat

Development
- Designer: Jim Brown
- Year: 1960s
- Role: inland and coastal cruising
- Name: Searunner 25

Boat
- Crew: 1-2
- Draft: 1.35 ft (0.41 m) (hull); 4.5 ft (1.4 m) (centerboard)

Hull
- Type: Trimaran
- Construction: 1/4" plywood
- Hull weight: 2,500 lb (1,100 kg)
- LOA: 25 ft (7.6 m)
- LWL: 23.1 ft (7.0 m)
- Beam: 16.7 ft (5.1 m)

The Searunner 25 is a trimaran sailboat from the 1960s designed by Jim Brown. It is the smallest boat in the Searunner series.

== See also ==
- List of multihulls
- Searunner 31
- Searunner 34
- Searunner 37
- Searunner 40
