= Tigercat (sailboat) =

1960s catamaran sailboat

Tigercat was a 1960s catamaran sailboat of the Eastern Multihull Sailing Association. In 1961 it was defeated by John Fisk sailing Hellcats II of the Clapham Sands Sailing Club four races to one.

== See also ==
- List of multihulls
- Trimaran
