= William Saurin (trimaran) =

William Saurin was an 80-foot (24 m) waterline length trimaran that was sailed across the Atlantic Ocean in 1984.

== See also ==
- List of multihulls
