= Aussie (trimaran) =

Australian sailboat

Development
- Designer: Ray Kendrick
- Location: Australia
- Year: About 2000
- Name: Aussie

Boat
- Crew: 1

Hull
- Type: Open trimaran
- Construction: 4 mm plywood and epoxy resin, tab and slot construction.
- LOA: 3 m (9.8 ft)

Hull appendages
- Keel: Centreboard

Rig
- Rig type: Bermuda or Marconi rig

The Aussie trimaran is a day-racing sailboat designed by Ray Kendrick to conform to International 3 metre sailing class rules. It is sold in plan form.

== See also ==
- List of multihulls
