= Gautier II =

43-foot waterline length trimaran

Gautier II was a 43-foot waterline length trimaran that was sailed across the Atlantic Ocean in 1981.

== See also ==
- List of multihulls
