= Catalac catamarans =

Former English catamaran construction company

Catalac
- Type: Limited Company
- Founded: 1976
- Founder: Tom Lack
- Headquarters: Christchurch, Dorset, England
- Products: Catamarans
- Website: catamaransite.com

Catalac is a defunct English maritime construction company that specialised in building sailing catamarans. The company was founded by Tom Lack (hence "Cata + Lac"), in Christchurch, Dorset. After a successful period of production, the company closed in 1986. In the 1990s, the Catalac 9M was briefly revived and updated in the US as the "Catalac 900".

== Catalac catamarans ==
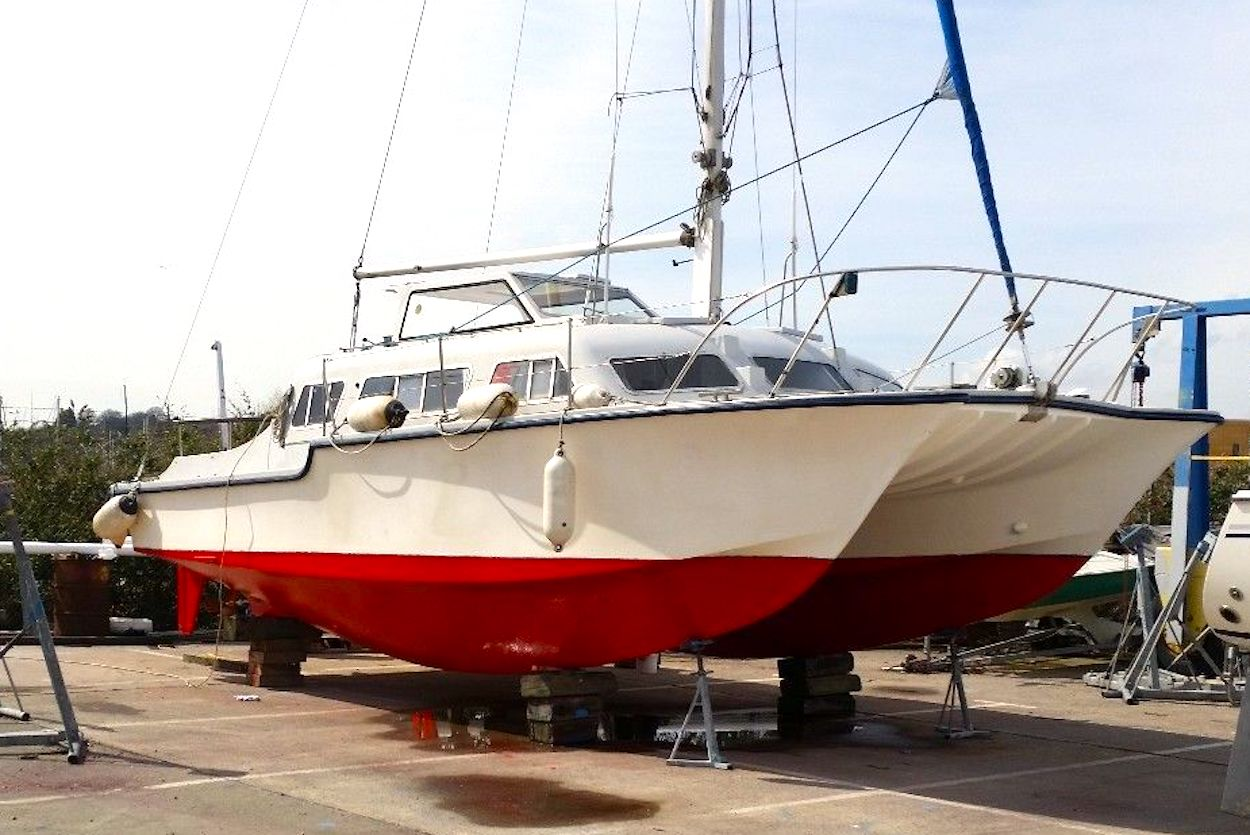
A Catalac 9M ashore, showing underwater hull profile with pronounced "rocker".

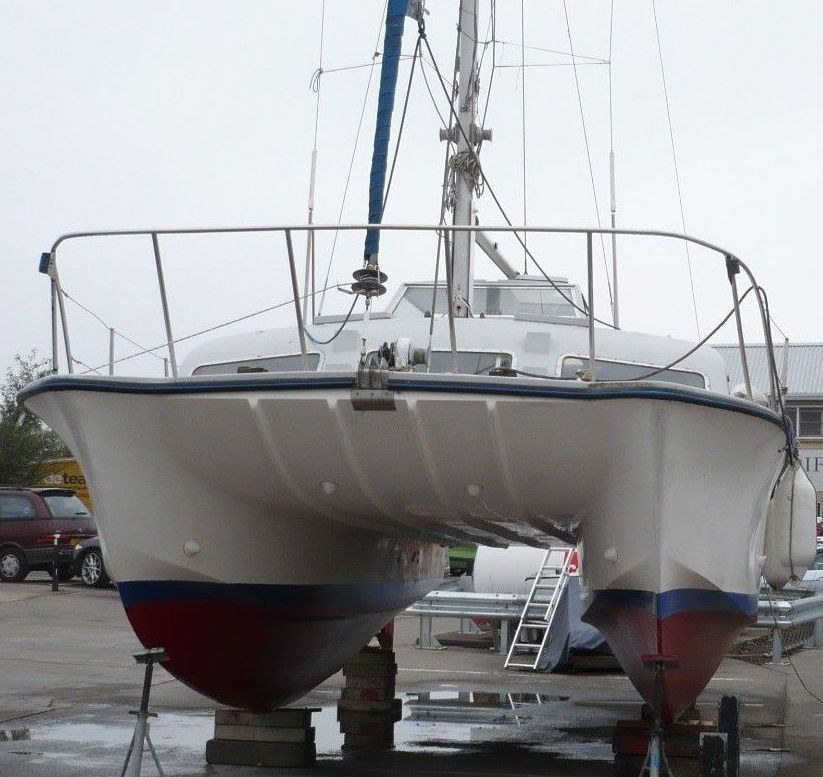
A Catalac 9M, showing the solid foredeck, the flared bow, and the hard chine hull section which gives reserve buoyancy.

The Catalac company's main model was the 9-metre 9M. All the other models are derived from the 9M and use a similar design concept; the 8M even used the same hulls as the 9M. All Catalacs were very strongly-built with thick grp hulls and glass windows. Some of the superstructure, such as the solid foredeck, was of sandwich grp construction. Compared to modern designs, Catalacs had a narrow beam of less than half the LOA, and vertical transoms (rather than the more modern "sugar scoop" with transom steps). Initially featuring lifting dinghy-type rudders, Catalac moved to fixed rudders protected by a skeg; this allowed the boats to sail a little closer to the wind. Only the 9M has a staggered sheerline (which allows easy aft access from a pontoon); the other models all have an unbroken sheerline.

The sailplan is a masthead Bermuda sloop of modest area. Although modern catamarans tend to have a fractional rig, the Catalac's mainsail has a straight leech, short battens and no roach. Twin backstays run to the transoms, enabling the forestay to be kept taut. The babystay gives a slight mast curvature to enable a fuller-shaped mainsail. There are no known examples of a Catalac ever pitchpoling or being blown over and upturned.

All Catalac catamarans feature:

- Widely-flaring chines and overhanging bows.
- A considerable "rocker" underwater profile to allow manoeuvrability and skidding to leeward under high winds.
- Solid foredeck with no trampoline.
- Twin inboard diesels (sited aft), or single centrally-placed steered outboard.
- Vertical transoms.
- Aft cockpit with protected wheel steering.
- Conventional accommodation, with two main berths on the bridgedeck forward of the saloon.
- Occasional single berths further aft in the hulls.
- Galley-below layout (in the port or starboard hull).
- Single head & shower room.
- Roller furling on the forestay.

== Reception ==
Catalacs have been very well received. In Cruising in Catamarans Charles Kanter declared that the Catalac "27 and 30 are among the best cruising catamarans ever produced". Kanter wrote,"when sailing in a 41-foot Catalac 12M alongside a beautiful 55 foot gold-plate ketch, Pacific High, we loped along with a steady upright forward motion and in 3 hours they were hull down over the horizon. In 16 hours we had covered 140-odd miles". In Catamarans for Cruising, Jim Andrews (himself a Catalac owner) praises the 9M's interior layout and its good sea-keeping qualities. A Practical Boat Owner magazine review of a Catalac 9M summarised it as a "competent, versatile and long-lasting cat".

Overall, 255 Catalac 9M boats were made, making it the most successful model in the range. The other production figures are: 8M - 216 built; 10M - 45 built; 11M - (no data); 12M - 27 built.

== Catalac models ==
Catalac 8M (a.k.a. 27)

- LOA: 27"
- LWL: 25' 4"
- Beam: 13' 8"
- Draft: 2' 4"
- Displacement: 6,000 lbs (dry)
- Sail area: Main xx sq ft, Jib 348 sq ft

Catalac 9M (a.k.a. 30)

- LOA: 29' 3"
- LWL: 25' 4"
- Beam: 13' 9"
- Draft: 2' 6"
- Displacement: 8,000 lbs (dry)
- Sail area: Main xx sq ft, Jib 348 sq ft

Catalac 10M (a.k.a. 34)

- LOA: 33' 8"
- LWL: 27'
- Beam: 15' 3"
- Draft: 2' 9"
- Displacement: 11,000 lbs (dry)
- Sail area: Main 283 sq ft, Genoa 333 sq ft

Catalac 11M (a.k.a. 36)

- LOA: 35' 9"
- LWL: 28' 3"
- Beam: 15' 5"
- Draft: 2' 9"
- Displacement: 13,000 lbs (dry)
- Sail area: Main 27fsq.ft; Genoa 333 sq.ft

Catalac 12M (a.k.a. 41)

- LOA: 40' 10"
- LWL:36' (est)
- Beam: 17' 6"
- Draft: 3' 1"
- Displacement: 18,500 lbs (dry)
- Sail area: Main: 336 sq ft, Genoa 410 sq ft

== See also ==
- List of multihulls
