= Lagoon 420 =

Sailboat class

Development
- Designer: Van Peteghem/Lauriot-Prevost
- Location: France
- Year: 2006
- No. built: 270
- Builder: Jeanneau
- Role: Cruiser
- Name: Lagoon 420

Boat
- Displacement: 16,040 lb (7,276 kg)
- Draft: 4.16 ft (1.27 m)

Hull
- Type: catamaran
- Construction: fiberglass
- LOA: 41.33 ft (12.60 m)
- LWL: 40.33 ft (12.29 m)
- Beam: 24.58 ft (7.49 m)
- Engine: one diesel engine/two electric motors

Hull appendages
- Keel: twin keels
- Rudder: two spade-type rudders

Rig
- Rig type: Bermuda rig

Sails
- Sailplan: fractional rigged sloop
- Total sail area: 809.00 sq ft (75.159 m^{2})

The Lagoon 420 is a French sailboat that was designed by Van Peteghem/Lauriot-Prevost as a cruiser and yacht charter boat, first built in 2006, as a 2007 model year introduction.

The boat was introduced at the 2006 US Sailboat Show in Annapolis, Maryland.

The Lagoon 420 has a unique hybrid diesel-electric drive system and sold as the first production hybrid sailboat. When a more conventional dual diesel engine arrangement was installed, the boat was designated as the Lagoon 421.

== Production ==
The design was built by Lagoon catamaran in France, starting in 2006 with 270 boats built, but it is now out of production.

The Lagoon 420 was replaced in production by the Lagoon 42-2 in 2016.

== Design ==
The Lagoon 420 is a recreational catamaran, built predominantly of polyester fiberglass, with wood trim. It has a fractional sloop rig. The hulls have plumb stems, reverse transoms with swimming platforms, dual internally mounted spade-type rudders controlled by a wheel and twin fixed fin keels. The helm station is mounted to the aft port salon bulkhead and has a rigid bimini top. The catamaran displaces 16,040 lb (7,276 kg).

The boat has a draft of 4.16 ft (1.27 m) with the standard twin keels.

The Lagoon 420 is fitted with a single 13.5-KVA 110-volt Onan diesel generator, which charges two banks of 12 volt batteries. The batteries power two 72 volt DC Nidec Leroy-Somer electric motors, one in each hull, for docking and maneuvering. While sailing the electric motors can provide regenerative charging of the batteries via the propellers. The fuel tank holds 79 U.S. gallons (300 L; 66 imp gal) and the fresh water tank has a capacity of 92 U.S. gallons (350 L; 77 imp gal). The Lagoon 421 has dual Yanmar 40 or 75 hp (30 or 56 kW) diesel engines, powering two saildrives.

The design was built with an interior in "owner's" or "charter" layout. The three-cabin owner's version has the port hull equipped with a queen-sized double berth aft, a lounge amidships and a large head with a shower forward. The starboard hull has a double berth-equipped cabin fore and aft with two heads amidships, with a shared shower. The four cabin charter version has sleeping accommodation for eight people, with both hulls arranged the same as the starboard hull on the owner's version. There is also a central salon, including the galley and navigation station.

The design has a hull speed of 8.51 kn (15.76 km/h).

== Operational history ==
In a 2007 Cruising World review, Jeremy McGeary wrote, "it's too early yet to see where the future of electric drive in sailboats is headed, but Lagoon has taken a bold step with the Lagoon 420 Hybrid, its first production sailing cat that marries a diesel generator and electric propulsion motors. In other respects, the 420 delivers what the world’s biggest catamaran builder always does: a comfortable ride in well-appointed surroundings."

== See also ==
- List of multihulls
- List of sailing boat types
