= Constant Camber 32 =

High-performance racing sailboat

Development
- Year: 1970s
- Name: Constant Camber 32

Boat
- Crew: 2

Hull
- Type: trimaran
- LOA: 32 ft (9.8 m)

Rig
- Rig type: sloop

Constant Camber 32 is a 32 ft (9.8 m) high performance day-racing / fast cruiser sloop trimaran sailboat designed in the 1970s for protected water and featuring berths for two adults.

== See also ==
- List of multihulls
