= Elf Aquitaine (catamaran) =

Elf Aquitaine was a 62-foot waterline length catamaran that was sailed across the Atlantic Ocean in 1981.

== See also ==
- List of multihulls
