= Searunner 37 =

Trimaran sailboat

Development
- Designer: Jim Brown
- Year: 1960s
- Name: Searunner 37

Boat
- Crew: 1-5
- Draft: 2.08 ft (0.63 m) (hull); 6.33 ft (1.93 m) (centerboard)

Hull
- Type: Trimaran
- Construction: Fiberglass over plywood
- Hull weight: 8,500 lb (3,900 kg)
- LOA: 37.33 ft (11.38 m)
- LWL: 34.33 ft (10.46 m)
- Beam: 5.83 ft (1.78 m) (center hull); 22.25 ft (6.78 m) (full beam)

Rig
- Mast height: 45 ft (14 m) (length); 48.5 ft (14.8 m) (bridge clearance)

Sails
- Mainsail area: 268 sq ft (24.9 m^{2})
- Total sail area: 760 sq ft (71 m^{2})

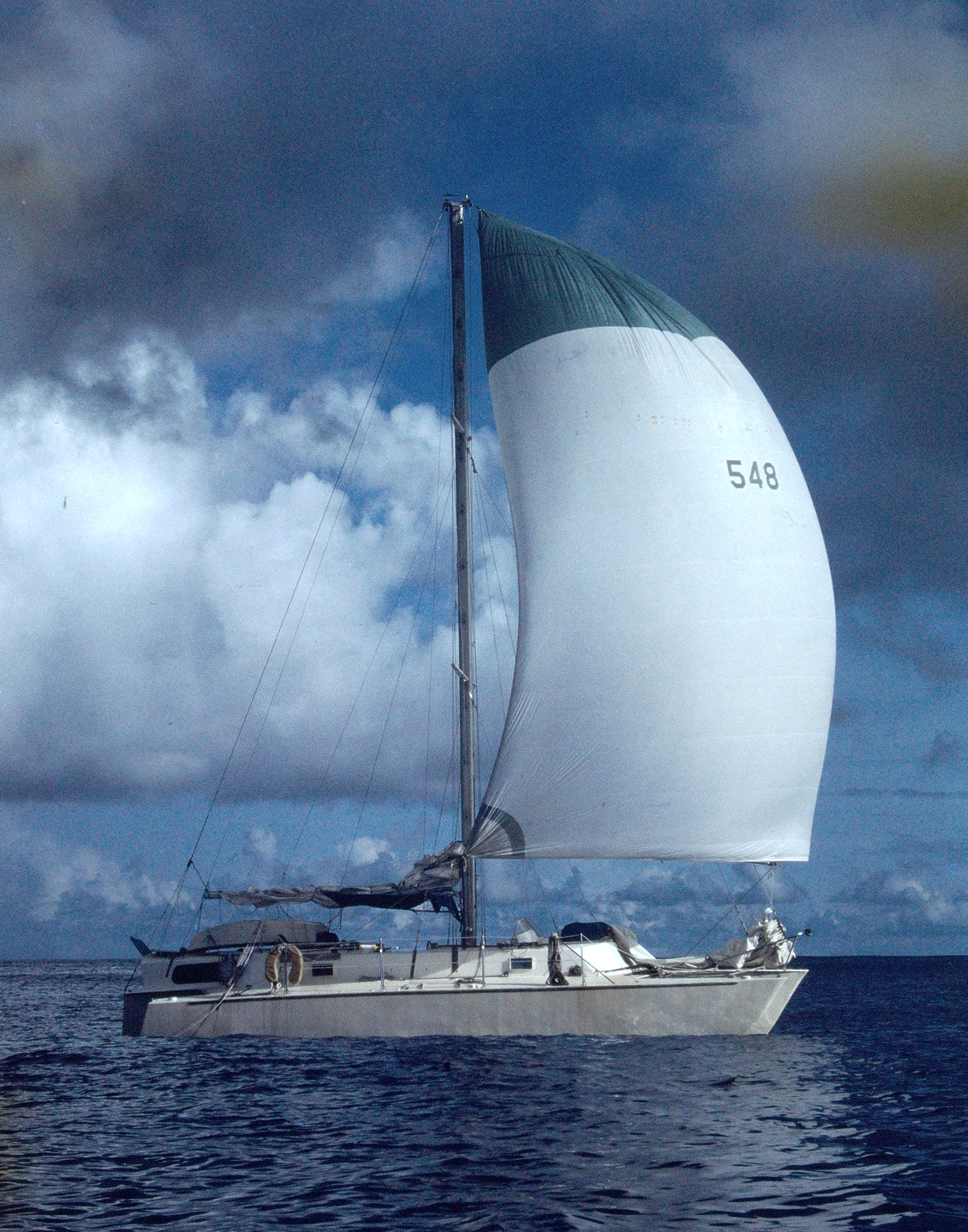
searunner 37 near the equator and international date line

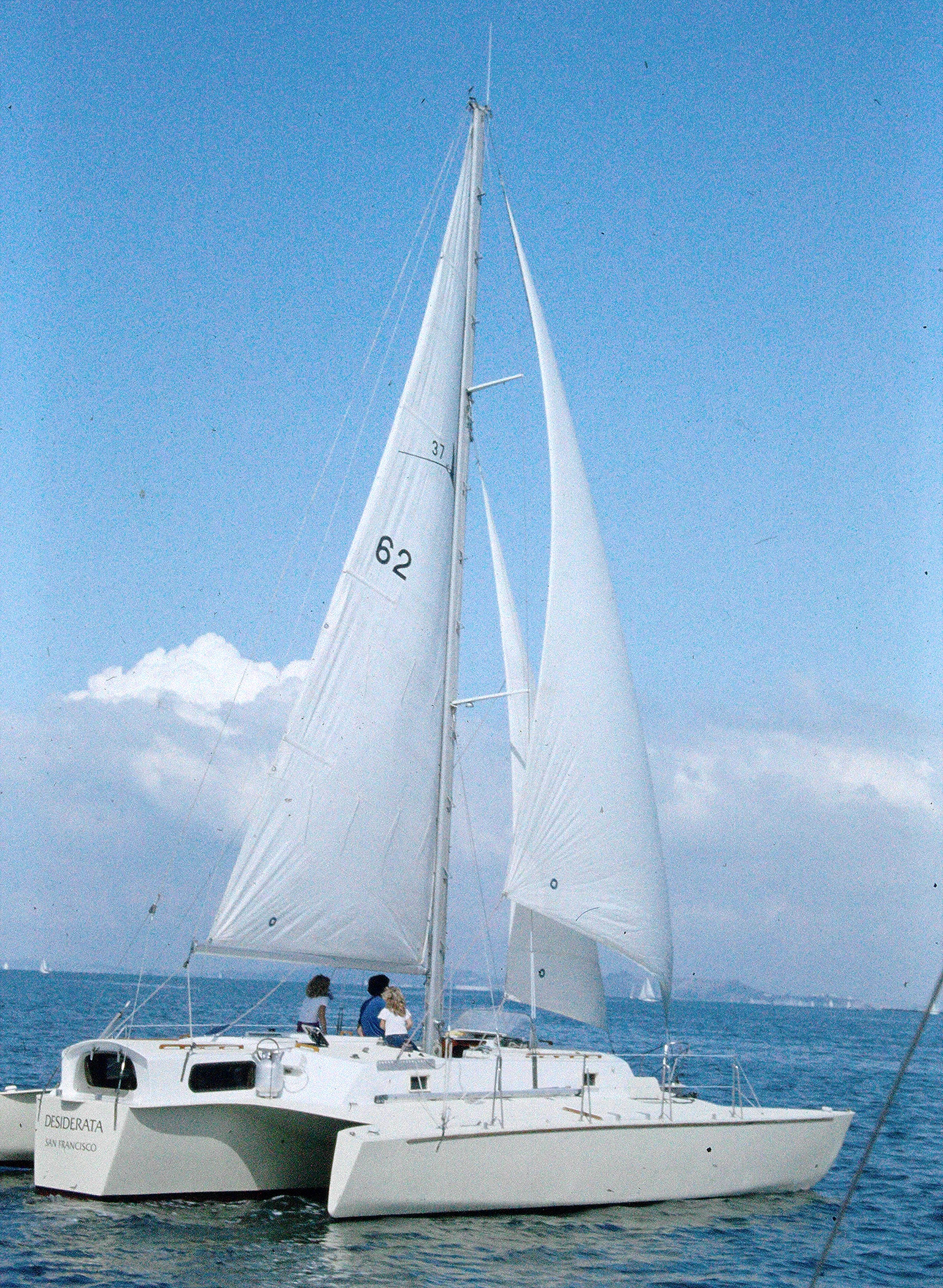
Searunner 37 on San Francisco Bay 1980

The Searunner 37 is a trimaran sailboat designed by Jim Brown in the 1960s. It is the second largest boat in the Searunner series, the largest being the Searunner 40.

== Reception ==
Jim Brown stayed with Piver's narrow-waisted hulls while introducing the centerboard, center cockpit, and cutter rig. Of the 47 multihulls we spotted outside U.S. waters, 13 were Brown designs. While poor payload capacity and hobby-horsing are owner complaints with the 31 and 37, his 40-footer gets high marks. The Searunner's safety record is outstanding. Its divided accommodation provides the best ventilation of any boat in the tropics.

— Randy Thomas, Yachting (1985)

== See also ==
- List of multihulls
- Searunner 25
- Searunner 31
- Searunner 40
