= Catri 25 =

Development
- Designer: Aldis Eglājs
- Location: Latvia
- Year: 2014
- Role: cruiser / racer
- Name: Catri 25

Boat
- Crew: 3 adults

Hull
- Type: Open trimaran
- Construction: E-glass/isophatic polyester resin, divinycell infusion formed sandwich, carbon/epoxy resin infusion formed laminate.

Hull appendages
- Keel: Centreboard

Rig
- Rig type: Fractional Bermuda or Marconi rig with headsail

Sails
- Mainsail area: 33 m^{2} (360 sq ft)
- Jib/genoa area: 14.7 m^{2} (158 sq ft)
- Spinnaker area: 23 m^{2} (250 sq ft)
- Total sail area: 70.7 m^{2} (761 sq ft)

Catri 25 is a foiled trimaran marketed by Catrigroup of Latvia that underwent initial testing in 2013–2014. It was designed as "an ultimate speed Category C cruising & racing micro-trimaran", with speed advantages provided by the hydrofoils. It follows the previous Catri23 and Catri24 designs.

== See also ==
- List of multihulls
