= Gauliosis IV =

Gauliosis IV was a 42-foot waterline length trimaran that was sailed across the Atlantic Ocean in 1982.

== See also ==
- List of multihulls
