= Jet Services II =

Jet Services II was a 60-foot waterline length catamaran that was sailed across the Atlantic Ocean in 1984.

== See also ==
- List of multihulls
- Jet Services V
