= Searunner 31 =

Trimaran sailboat

Development
- Designer: Jim Brown
- Year: 1960s
- Name: Searunner 31

Boat
- Crew: 1–4
- Draft: 1.92 ft (0.59 m) (hull); 5.75 ft (1.75 m) (centerboard)

Hull
- Type: Trimaran
- Hull weight: 4,000 lb (1,800 kg)
- LOA: 31.17 ft (9.50 m)
- LOH: 28.08 ft (8.56 m)
- Beam: 18.67 ft (5.69 m) (full); 5 ft (1.5 m) (main hull)

Rig
- Mast height: 35 ft (11 m) (from trunk); 41 ft (12 m) (bridge clearance)

Sails
- Mainsail area: 195 sq ft (18.1 m^{2})
- Total sail area: 552 sq ft (51.3 m^{2})

The Searunner 31 is a trimaran sailboat designed by Jim Brown in the 1960s. It is the most popular boat in the Searunner series, which includes models from 25 ft (7.6 m) to 40 ft (12 m).

The Searunner 31 is a small, trailerable trimaran sailboat known for its performance, versatility, and seaworthiness. It was designed to be sailed single-handedly or with a small crew and was intended for both cruising and racing.

Jim Brown designed the Searunner 31 as part of his series of Searunner trimarans, which includes various sizes ranging from 25 to 52 feet (7.6 to 15.8 meters). The Searunner line of trimarans is highly regarded for its innovative design and practicality.

The Searunner 31 features three hulls connected by crossbeams, with the central hull being wider and providing stability. This design offers several advantages, including increased speed, stability, and spacious accommodation compared to monohull sailboats of similar size.

The sail plan of the Searunner 31 typically includes a main sail, jib, and sometimes a spinnaker. The trimaran configuration allows for efficient sailing in a wide range of wind conditions, with the ability to achieve higher speeds than monohull designs.

One of the notable characteristics of the Searunner 31 is its folding mechanism. The amas (outer hulls) can be folded parallel to the center hull, reducing the beam and allowing the boat to be easily trailered or stored in a marina slip.

== Reception ==
Jim Brown stayed with Piver's narrow-waisted hulls while introducing the centerboard, center cockpit, and cutter rig. Of the 47 multihulls we spoke outside U.S. waters, 13 were Brown designs. While poor payload capacity and hobby-horsing are owner complaints with the 31 and 37, his 40-footer gets high marks. The Searunner's safety record is outstanding. Its divided accommodation provides the best ventilation of any boat in the tropics.

— Randy Thomas, Yachting (1985)

== See also ==
- List of multihulls
- Searunner 25
- Searunner 37
- Searunner 40
