= Lagoon 47 =

Sailboat class

Development
- Designer: Van Peteghem/Lauriot-Prevost
- Location: France
- Year: 1992
- Builders: Jeanneau; Lagoon Catamaran
- Role: Cruiser
- Name: Lagoon 47

Boat
- Displacement: 19,842 lb (9,000 kg)
- Draft: 3.58 ft (1.09 m)

Hull
- Type: catamaran
- Construction: fiberglass
- LOA: 46.25 ft (14.10 m)
- LWL: 42.67 ft (13.01 m)
- Beam: 24.92 ft (7.60 m)
- Engine: Two Yanmar 3JH3E 40 hp (30 kW) diesel engines

Hull appendages
- Keel: twin keels
- Rudder: Twin spade-type rudders

Rig
- Rig type: Bermuda rig

Sails
- Sailplan: fractional rigged sloop

The Lagoon 47 is a French sailboat that was designed by Van Peteghem/Lauriot-Prevost as a cruiser and first built in 1992.

The design was popular in the yacht charter business and was replaced in the company product line by the Lagoon 470 in 1998.

== Production ==
The design was built by Jeanneau's Lagoon catamaran division in France, starting in 1992, but it is now out of production.

== Design ==
The Lagoon is a recreational catamaran, built predominantly of polyester fiberglass, with wood trim. It has a fractional sloop rig, with a deck-stepped mast, two sets of swept spreaders and aluminum spars with continuous stainless steel wire rigging. The hulls have raked stems, reverse transoms with swimming platforms, dual internally mounted spade-type rudders controlled by a wheel and twin fixed fin keels. It displaces 19,842 lb (9,000 kg).

The boat has a draft of 3.58 ft (1.09 m) with the standard twin keels. It is fitted with twin Japanese Yanmar 3JH3E diesel engines of 40 hp (30 kW) each for docking and maneuvering.

The design has a hull speed of 8.75 kn (16.21 km/h).

== Operational history ==
In a 2016 review, Multihulls World reported, "following the Lagoon 55, one of the most beautiful production catamarans destined for character, here is the Lagoon 47, more manageable... and cheaper! Charterers will not fear taking it out without the help of a crew and the "owner" version will interest those who want to make an ocean voyage on a fast boat that's both pleasant to live on a fast boat that's both pleasant to live on and to look at."

== See also ==
- List of multihulls
- List of sailing boat types
