= Dict Robert =

Dict Robert was a 50-foot waterline length trimaran that was sailed across the Atlantic Ocean in 1981.

== See also ==
- List of multihulls
