= Lagoon 42-2 =

Sailboat class

Development
- Designer: Van Peteghem/Lauriot-Prevost; Nauta Design
- Location: France
- Year: 2016
- Builder: Lagoon Catamaran
- Role: Cruiser
- Name: Lagoon 42-2

Boat
- Displacement: 26,460 lb (12,002 kg)
- Draft: 4.08 ft (1.24 m)

Hull
- Type: catamaran
- Construction: fiberglass
- LOA: 42.00 ft (12.80 m)
- LWL: 41.00 ft (12.50 m)
- Beam: 25.25 ft (7.70 m)
- Engine: Two Yanmar 4JH4 45 hp (34 kW) diesel engines

Hull appendages
- Keel: twin keels
- Rudder: Twin spade-type rudders

Rig
- Rig type: Bermuda rig

Sails
- Sailplan: fractional rigged sloop
- Mainsail area: 743 sq ft (69.0 m^{2})
- Jib/genoa area: 377 sq ft (35.0 m^{2})
- Other sails: Code 0: 732 sq ft (68.0 m^{2})
- Upwind sail area: 1,119 sq ft (104.0 m^{2})
- Downwind sail area: 1,475 sq ft (137.0 m^{2})

The Lagoon 42-2, also called the Lagoon 42-2016, is a French sailboat that was designed by Van Peteghem/Lauriot-Prevost with styling by Nauta Design. It was designed as a cruiser for private owners and the yacht charter market, and was first built in 2016.

The Lagoon 42-2 replaced the 2007 Lagoon 420 in production.

The design is marketed by the manufacturer as the Lagoon 42, but is usually referred to as the 42-2 to differentiate it from the unrelated 1990 Lagoon 42 design.

== Production ==
The design has been built by Lagoon catamaran in France, since 2016 and remains in production.

== Design ==
The Lagoon 42-2 is a recreational catamaran, built predominantly of injection-molded polyester fiberglass sandwich, with wood trim. It has a fractional sloop rig with a bowsprit, with a deck-stepped VMG Soromap mast, a single set of swept diamond spreaders and aluminum spars with continuous 1X19 stainless steel wire rigging. A square top mainsail is optional. The hulls have plumb stems, reverse transoms with swimming platforms, dual internally mounted spade-type rudders controlled by a wheel and twin fixed fin keels. It displaces 26,460 lb (12,002 kg).

The boat has a draft of 4.08 ft (1.24 m) with the standard twin keels.

The boat is fitted with twin Japanese Yanmar 4JH4 diesel engines of 45 hp (34 kW) each, for docking and maneuvering. The fuel tank holds 79 U.S. gallons (300 L; 66 imp gal) and the fresh water tank has a capacity of 79 U.S. gallons (300 L; 66 imp gal).

The design has sleeping accommodations for six or eight people in three or four cabins. The three cabin interior has a cabin with a double berth in the bow and stern of the port hull and the stern of the starboard hull cabin. There are three heads with showers, one for each cabin, including a large head in the starboard hull bow and two amidships to port. The four cabin interior adds a cabin and head in the starboard hull bow. The salon has an L-shaped settee. The galley is located across both sides aft in the salon and is equipped with a four-burner stove, an ice box and double sinks. A navigation station is opposite the galley, on the starboard side. Cabin maximum headroom is 79 in (201 cm).

For reaching or sailing downwind the design may be equipped with a code 0 sail of 732 sq ft (68.0 m^{2}).

The design has a hull speed of 8.58 kn (15.89 km/h).

== Operational history ==
A katamarans.com review, reported, "This is a heavy boat, so you will need to put some money in your sail locker to power it. Off the wind, you can call these boats nippy (it's a catamaran after all), but you won't be setting any speed records closer to the wind, particular in lighter conditions. Make sure the square top mainsail is at the top of your options list. A code 0 would be nice too."

In a 2016 review for Sail Magazine, Zuzana Prochazka wrote, "we set a giant aquamarine 732ft² Code 0 that dwarfed pretty much everything around us, including Lagoon's new 63ft power cat that came alongside to take pictures and toss us some liquid refreshments. At a 75 degree apparent wind angle, we sailed at 7 knots in just 10 knots of breeze. Our speed then fell to 5.3 knots as we bore away to 110 degrees. (Later, the boat went to Bimini and reported doing 15 knots in 22 knots of true wind on flat water with the kite up.) I wished for windier conditions, but since that was not to be, the next best thing was sailing back under the bridge with the enormous gennaker flying."

== See also ==
- List of multihulls
- List of sailing boat types
