= Telstar trimaran =

Telstar trimarans is a line of trimarans most recently built by the Performance Cruising Inc shipyard in Annapolis, Maryland.

The line has been designed and built by Tony Smith, with the initial design created in early 1970s. Construction continued until 1981 with some minor modifications to the main design, and then stopped. A completely re-designed model, Telstar 28, has been re-launched in 2003 and in production until late 2009. Currently the production is on hold and it is not clear if it will resume.

All models of the Telstar line has been designed as foldable trimarans suitable for both racing and cruising and focused around a few key design aspects: trailerability, ease of handling by a single person, safety, good cruising accommodations, and shallow draft. New Telstar models sport a folding mechanism allowing its outer hulls (amas or outriggers) to be retracted alongside the main hull, while still allowing the boat to be moved under the engine power. This permits the boat to use marina berths intended for monohulls and be trailered without a need for special permits. Another unique design point is the system for raising and lowering the mast without the need for any external equipment. This allows the boat to be taken in and out of a trailer in a matter of an hour. The Telstar trimarans have shallow draft and can be beached since both their centreboard and the rudder can be lifted.

== History ==
The Telstar line has been designed and built by Tony Smith; in 1969 Tony Smith was 25 years old and had built two 25 ft (7.6 m) trimarans and raced 3,000 miles (4,800 km) round Britain in a 33 ft (10 m) trimaran. Smith had developed a vast store of knowledge about trimarans and their behavior in varying sea states. As Tony describes, "I was ready to make the next quantum leap in design." Up to that point, most trimarans had been built using flat sheets of plywood which had been the latest technology developed after the war. Fiberglass was only beginning to make its way into boat building. Tony's design criteria for a 26' trimaran included 4 person accommodation, standing head room, load carrying, maneuverability, good looks and speed. Of course, Smith was also out to create a more reliable design, as the early plywood trimarans had a terrible reputation for falling apart. Using fiberglass technology, Smith could now make a round hull that had the least wetted surface - making for a faster boat. Throughout this early phase of design, Smith was living with his parents; he pinned up designs all over the house showing different drawings of Telstar. "I believed that if it looked right it probably was," says Smith of his early designs.

Smith built the prototype Telstar in his parents' garage. The "shop" even included an oven to shape ridged foam for the foam sandwich construction to produce the necessary shapes, as Smith did not want to accept a compromise shape because of material constraints. The first Telstar was built solid at 15 ft (4.6 m) beam. The first sail of Telstar was "unbelievable." Almost immediately it reached 15 knots. It was faster than any racing cat, tacked like a dinghy and went to windward better than any mono hull. The accommodation was better than any 26 ft (7.9 m) Folk-boat which was a very popular mono hull at the time. Telstar was a true revolution - winning every race and it was pure fun to sail. Of course the first boat was very light being built of foam sandwich construction. A year later, Smith launched his first company – A.J.S. Sandwich Yacht Construction in Sandwich, Kent in England to manufacture the new design. The first version of Telstar was very successful and more than 300 units were manufactured, in various revisions.

In 1974 Tony designed and produced a bigger, 35 feet (11 m) version of Telstar, with rigid hull joins and bigger accommodations. Only a few were produced.

In 1981, Tony Smith relocated with his family to United States. A new company, Performance Cruising Inc, was formed in Annapolis, MD to continue manufacturing of the Telstar line. Shortly after that a fire destroyed the factory and the Telstar hull molds.

Smith switched to design and produced a completely new boat – the Gemini catamaran. The production was very successful and resulted in Smiths' developing a very streamlined system with manufacturing done all at one site and direct sales system. The success of Gemini provided a financial stability and a foundation to look back into Telstar design. In 2003 a completely redesigned Telstar 28 was launched, featuring improved hull shapes, a new folding mechanism, and a new mast raising system. The boat was well received and drew a lot of interest. The construction went on and about 90 hulls were built until production halted in 2009. In 2009, a combination of a slowing economy and Tony Smith going for a semi-retirement forced the stop of the Telstar construction. The company split the two product lines and formed a new company to handle the Telstar 28 trimarans. The Gemini line of catamarans continues to be sold under the Performance Cruising brand, and the company went into partnership with Catamaran Company. The Telstar 28 line was put on hold with an unclear future.

== Product line ==
=== Telstar 26 MK1 ===
The first model in the Telstar series. First produced in 1970 and in production until 1975. 80 hulls of this type were built, all by Sandwich Yacht Construction Ltd in United Kingdom. The design was novel at the time and showed that combination of speed, comfort, safety and accommodations can be achieved in a single design.

The boat was designed with amas connected to the main hull by rigid decks. The outer hulls and decks could fold down for trailering. Accommodations included seating for up to eight on benches that convert to 4 single bunks, one bunk extending to a double, galley, dining table, and a marine toilet in the forecabin. The estimated top speed was 15 knots.

LOA (length overall):	26 ft 3 in
LWL (length at waterline):	24 ft 6 in
Beam:	15 ft (4.6 m)
Draft minimum:	1 ft 6 in
Draft maximum:	4 ft 7 in
Sail area:	340 sq ft (32 m^{2})
Mast height (above deck):	30 ft 2 in
Number of berths:	4 - 5
Typical engine:	9.9 HP
Displacement	3500 lb

=== Telstar 26 MK2 ===
The Telstar 26 MK 2 is a refinement of the MK 1 model. The improvements included increased headroom in the main cabin (to 6 ft) and changes to the folding mechanism of the amas. This model was produced from 1976 to 1978. A reported 88 hulls of that make were produced. Tony Smith produced a fixed ama version of the Mk 2, Telstar SP (the hinges and removable struts were replaced with solid struts), with kevlar reinforcement, a metal centreboard (housed in a fully enclosed casing) and a three-quarter rig on longer mast which he raced in the 1978 Round Britain Race (finishing in 10th place), the AZAB and the STAR. This example still in commission and is based on the Clyde in Scotland.

=== Telstar 26 MK3 ===
The Telstar 26 MK 3 is a further development of the MK 2. The improvements included an increase in beam of the main hull to improve the interior volume. Overall beam of the boat has increased to 16 ft (4.9 m), from earlier 15 ft (4.6 m). The model was built between 1978 and 1979.

=== Telstar 8m ===
The Telstar 8m was a continuation of the Telstar 26 line. It was in production from 1979 to 1981 and was the last model in the early Telstar line. This model was built in the UK and later production moved to the US with relocation of the Telstar factory. Only a few hulls were manufactured in the US plant. The production stopped due to the factory fire. There were two versions of the Telstar 8m: regular one and Telstar 8m/E. The 'E' version was lighter and with a taller rig.

The Manta 29, manufactured in Townsville, Australia, in the 1980s, is a very similar design to the 8m or 26 MK3, with very similar shape of all main features, but made with different parts. It is slightly longer at the stern, to give a longer rudder handle .

LOA (length overall):	26 ft 3 in
LWL (length at waterline):	24 ft 6 in
Beam:	16 ft (4.9 m)
Draft minimum:	1 ft 6 in
Draft maximum:	4 ft 7 in
Sail area:	296 sq ft (27.5 m^{2})
Mast height (above deck):	
Number of berths:	4
Typical engine:	9.9 HP
Displacement	3500 lb

=== Telstar 35 ===
The Telstar 35 was constructed in 1974 and had a very short production. About 8 hulls of this model were constructed. The boat differ from other Telstars in having rigid hull joins, with no ability to fold it for trailering. It provided much larger accommodations than other Telstar models.

LOA (length overall):	35 ft (11 m)
LWL (length at waterline):	
Beam:	
Draft minimum:	
Draft maximum:	
Sail area:	470 sq ft (44 m^{2})
Mast height (above deck):	
Number of berths:	
Typical engine:	
Displacement	11000 lb

=== Telstar 28 ===
The Telstar 28 has been introduced in January 2003. It has been a complete redesign comparing the original Telstar series from 20 year earlier. It however kept the same principles in mind of delivering a good weekend cruising boat, easy to sail, easy to trailer and with good performance characteristics. This model is also known as T2.

The Telstar 28 has a number of distinguishing features, when comparing to the earlier versions as well as other foldable trimarans. Most notable is the folding mechanism for the amas. The amas fold in, by swiveling in and out alongside the main hull, reducing the beam from 18 ft (5.5 m) to 8 ft 6 in, without extending the boat's overall length. The amas submerse approximately an additional four inches when retracted but retain their orientation to the main hull, so no additional surface is exposed to fouling if the amas were painted for the retracted waterline. This allows the boat to be berthed in a standard marina slip for extended period of time, eliminating one of the main problems facing trimaran owners. The folding mechanism is locked in the in or out position by a pair of line clutches in each cockpit locker, where one line controls the tension of the trampolines and the other actually locks the ama in position.

Second important innovation is the mast folding system. The mast can be raised or lowered by a single person controlling a single line run from the mast base to one of the genoa sheet winches. The mast is supported during the raising and lowering process by a set of metal A-frames, one set of which doubles as the lower aft shrouds when the mast is raised. The whole system does not require any adjustment to be made to the standing rigging.

Comparing to earlier Telstars, this model is beamier and longer. The increased stability allows it to carry more sail area. The additional sail area gives this Telstar model improved performance over the older models. However, the older models had more interior room due to the changes in hull shape that were made to accommodate the new folding system.

To date about 90 hulls of this type were built. The production has stopped in 2009 due to the overall economic conditions. Since then the Performance Cruising company has been split into two companies: Performance Cruising, now owned by a management company headed by Tony's daughter, Laura Hershfeld, which now is responsible for the Gemini line of catamarans partnered with Catamaran Company, which manages the PCI marina facilities and acts as a broker for Gemini catamarans; and Performance Sailing, which was formed to handle the Telstar 28 line. However, this company has not resumed production of the Telstar 28 and the fate of the Telstar 28 is currently in limbo.

LOA (length overall):	27 ft 6 in
LWL (length at waterline):	26 ft 6 in
Beam:	18 ft (5.5 m)
Draft minimum:	1' 2"
Draft maximum:	4' 3" for the earlier models, and 5 ft (1.5 m) for the later ones
Sail area:	524 sq ft (48.7 m^{2}) for the normal mast version, slightly more for the tall mast version as the mainsail has approximately an additional 3' of luff length, since the boom is a slight bit lower on the tall mast versions.
Mast height (above deck):	35 ft 6 in or 38 ft (12 m) for the tall mast versions
Number of berths:	4
Typical engine:	20 HP or 50 HP
Displacement	4000 lb
