= Sprint 15 =

- On the Beach at Pentewan Sands UK

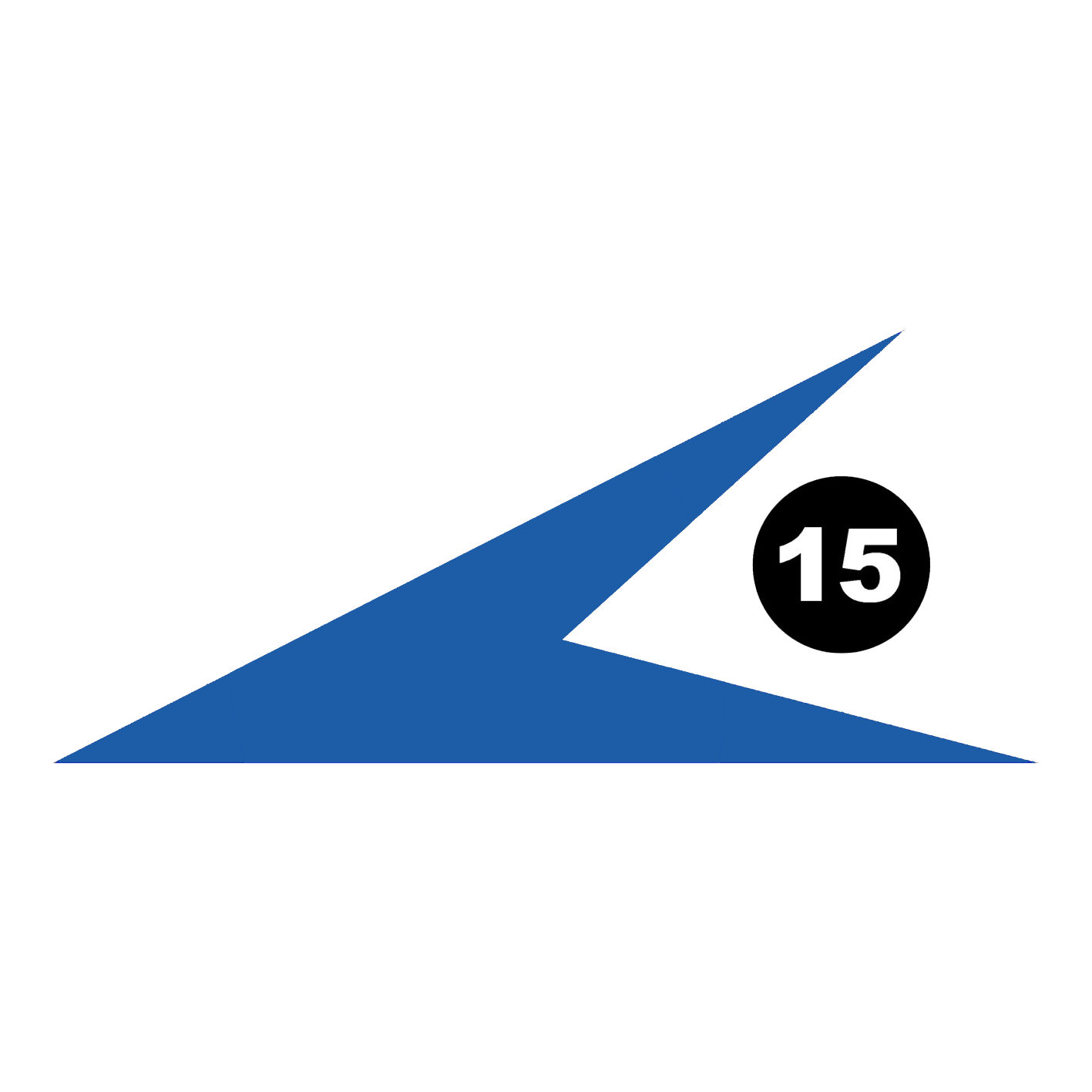

Boat
- Crew: 1 or 2

Hull
- Hull weight: 114 kg
- LOA: 4.54 m (14.9 ft)
- Beam: 2.13 m (7 ft 0 in)

Rig
- Mast height: 6.715 m (22.03 ft)

Sails
- Mainsail area: 10.19 m^{2}
- Jib/genoa area: 2.10 m^{2}

Racing
- RYA PN: 894 (2 sails); 931 (1 sail)

The Dart 15 is a one-design 15-foot-long (4.6 m) glassfibre sailing catamaran, principally sailed in the UK. It is designed to be sailed by one or two people and has a furling jib and trapeze. It can be raced with or without the jib and trapeze, and there are national championships held in both categories. Between 2005 and 2022 the class was known as the Sprint 15.

== Weight ==
Hull 33 kg per hull; Trolley 6 kg; Road base 100 kg; Trailing weight 174.5 kg; Mast 10.5 kg.

== RYA handicap ratings ==
- 926 - Sailed "Unarig" (one person with just the main)
- 904 - Sailed "Sport" (one person with main, jib & trapeze)

== History ==
The Dart 15 was designed in 1979 by Rodney March, who was also responsible for the design of the Olympic Tornado class catamaran. Originally built by Panthercraft Ltd of Penryn in Cornwall as the "Spark", the boat was then sold through The Laser Centre in Banbury, UK and was renamed the Dart 15. Production was transferred in 2005 to Collins Fibreglass of South Africa, who also manufacture the Dart 18 catamaran. In 2005 the name of the boat was changed from Dart 15 to Sprint 15. On 1 January 2023 the class's name reverted to Dart 15. At present just over 2,000 Dart 15 boats have been sold, and there is an active class association and racing schedule. The Dart 15 is in the top 2 most popular racing catamaran fleets each year in the UK (by national championship entries).

A Dart 15 was sailed single-handedly clockwise around the British mainland in the summer of 2019.

== See also ==
- List of multihulls
