= Stingray catamaran =

The Stingray Catamaran sport catamaran is an Australian designed 5.5 m long beach catamaran with a twin trapeze setup.

It is sailed doublehanded with a jib and mainsail.

== Overview ==
Built out of plywood or a fiberglass/foam composition the Stingray has an 18 (5.5m) foot hull that weighs 88.5 kg, which is light for a boat of its size. The boat has both a mainsail and a jib totaling 225 square feet (20.9m2) of sail surface area. Due to its simplicity of design and efficient rig system even sailors with little experience can navigate it easily.

Originally designed in the 1960s, the Stingray platform was overhauled in the 1980s with a taller wing-shaped mast and greater sail area. There are now two types of stingrays; those of the original design, called Mk1; and those with the "Big Rig," referred to as Mk2 Stingrays. Very few of the original Mk1's are still in existence.

The stingray continues to be considered a fast boat although it could be seen as an older design. With its very large jib it is quite fast on a reach. Stingrays are well renowned racing boats, particularly in passage style races like the Goolwa-Milang in South Australia.

== Class development ==
The Stingray is still actively sailing in South Australia and Victoria. National titles continue to be held each summer.

Although outside class rules and unable to be used in class competition (i.e. National Titles) recent years have seen Asymmetric Spinnakers or 'Kites' added to the Stingray for increased downwind performance. Two of the Kite enabled Stingrays were set up in South Australia by members of the Victor Harbor Yacht Club. Despite speculation that the rig would not be able sustain the high loads inflicted by the Kite The Shadow (#582) now based in VIC is yet to have any serious malfunction, and the manufacturer of the "Superwing" mast feels the mast is strong enough.

== See also ==
- History of sailing

== More information ==
http://www.stingraycatamaran.com
