= Neel Trimarans =

Manufacturer of trimarans

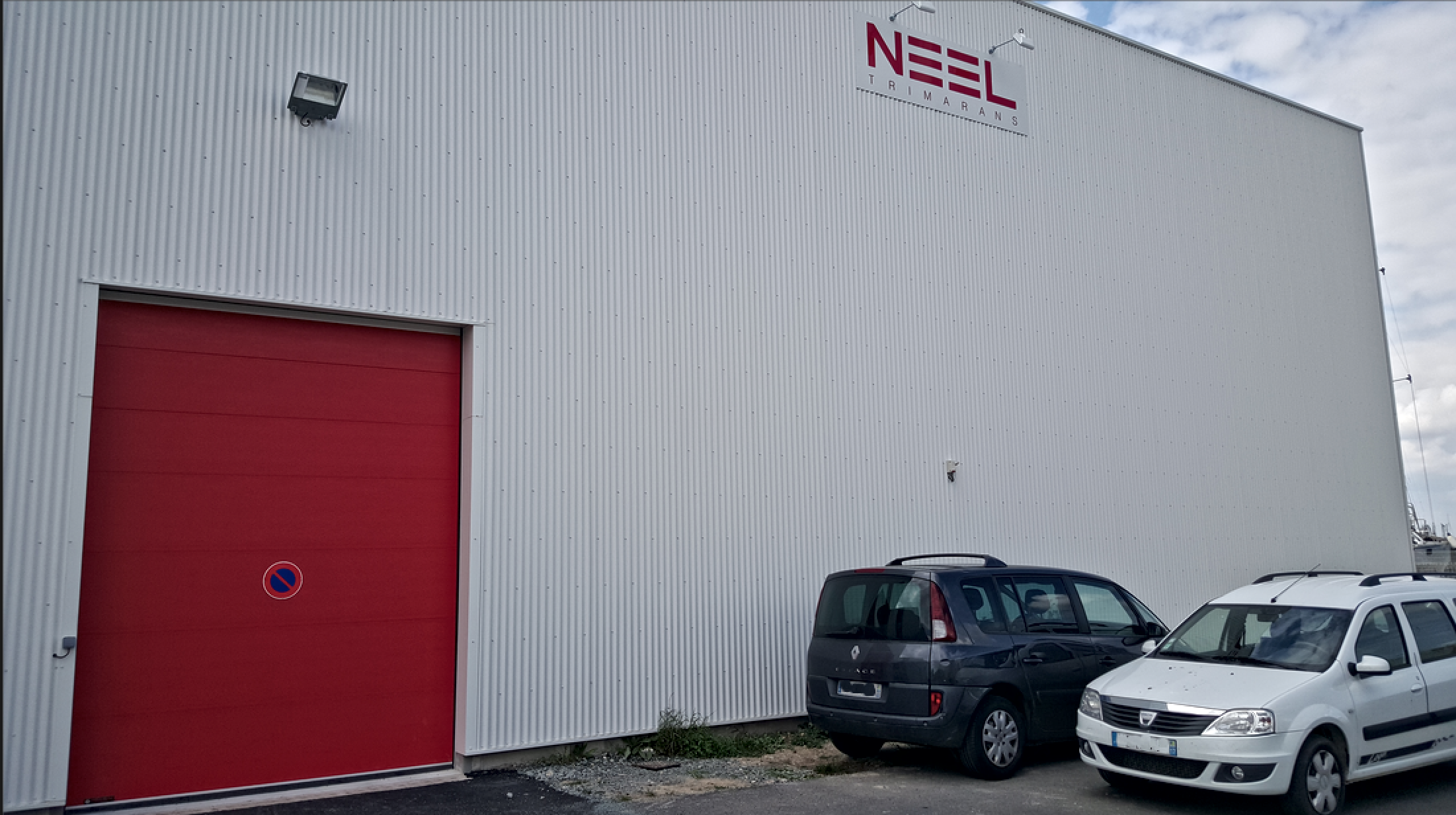
The Neel Trimarans Facility in La Rochelle, France. Photographed April 27, 2015.

Neel Trimarans is a manufacturer of trimarans based in La Rochelle, France.

The company was founded and is managed by Eric Bruneel, formerly of Fountaine-Pajot, a large and established manufacturer in the same area with a catamaran focus.

== History ==
2010

Design of the NEEL 50 prototype, validation of the concept and first communications on the NEEL-TRIMARANS brand.

2011

Design and production of the NEEL 45, the company’s first production boat. CE certification of the world’s first deep-sea cruising trimaran.

2012

NEEL 45 is launched. It will sell more than 26 models.

2013

- NEEL 45 is elected Boat of the Year by Sailing World and receives the Innovation Award by Cruising World (2 prestigious American awards).
- Creation of the dealers network, purchase of land for the construction of a factory on the plateau nautique of La Rochelle.

2014

- Establishment of the plant on the plateau nautique of La Rochelle.
- Design studies for NEEL 65 and manufacture of industrial tools.

2015

- The first NEEL 65 is equipped for commercial use with a permanent crew for luxury charter. It defines the company towards new quality standards.
- The NEEL 45 “La Caravelle” is the winner of the ARC (Transatlantic Rally-Race). It demonstrates the performance of a trimaran against carbon catamarans.

2017

Launch of NEEL 51

2018

- The NEEL 51 is three-time awarded (European Yacht of the Year, Multihull of the Year, USA Best Boat)
- Construction of the 2nd plant and new NEEL-TRIMARANS offices
- Acquisition of a new shipyard (TechniYachts) on the plateau nautique in La Rochelle: + 5,000 square meters
- Launch of the NEEL 65 EVOLUTION, a new version of the NEEL 65 with an optimized interior layout.

2019

- Launch of NEEL 47.
- The NEEL 47 is the winner (all categories combined) of the ARC +, a transatlantic rally race.

2020

- NEEL-TRIMARANS celebrates its 10th anniversary.
- Launch of the LEEN range of trimarans (powered trimarans).

2021

- Launch of the NEEL 43 – Yannick Bestaven, winner of the 2021 Vendée Globe, is the Godfather of the model.
- Launch of the first LEEN 56, the first trawler trimaran with a hybrid motorisation.
- Construction and delivery of 2 new factories and an office building on the Plateau nautique of La Rochelle.
- Creation of TRIMARAN YACHT CHARTER, a subsidiary of NEEL-TRIMARANS specialized in the rental and sale of NEEL trimarans.

2022

- Launch of the first LEEN 72, flagship of the LEEN-TRIMARANS range.
- Announcement of the LEEN 50.
- Purchase of a new production plant in Périgny (12,300 additional sq. m. of production area).
- Announcement of the NEEL 52.

== Models ==
- Neel 45
- Neel 47
- Neel 65
