= Fleury Michon IV =

Fleury Michon IV was a 42-foot waterline length catamaran that was sailed across the Atlantic Ocean in 1981.

== See also ==
- List of multihulls
- Fleury Michon
