= Amatasi =

Type of Samoan double-hulled watercraft

Amatasi are a type of Samoan double-hulled watercraft. Its sails were woven pandanus leaves tied to 2 spars. The hull was sometimes built of planks. Lashed together, large double canoes 30–60 feet (9–18 metres) long could carry 25 men on journeys of hundreds of miles.

== See also ==
- List of multihulls
- va'a
- va'a-tele
