= Avalon 8.2 =

Development
- Designer: Ray Kendrick
- Location: Australia
- Year: About 1990
- Name: Avalon 8.2

Boat
- Crew: 3-4
- Draft: 0.3 m (0.98 ft) (board up); 1.35 m (4.4 ft) (board down)

Hull
- Type: trimaran
- Construction: Foam core strip planks or foam sandwich over male mould.
- Hull weight: 1,000 kg (2,200 lb)
- LOA: 8.2 m (27 ft)
- LWL: 7.685 m (25.21 ft)
- Beam: 6.2 m (20 ft); 2.5 m (8.2 ft) (folded)

Hull appendages
- Keel: centerboard

Rig
- Rig type: Bermuda or Marconi rig

Sails
- Total sail area: 36.6 m^{2} (394 sq ft)

The Avalon 8.2 folding trimaran is a trailerable fast cruising and racing sailboat designed by Ray Kendrick. It is sold in plan form.

== See also ==
- List of multihulls
