= Torpen International Boats =

Torpen International Boats are the manufacturers of the Multi 23 trimaran sailboat, designed by French firm VPLP. The boats are manufactured in Qingdao, Shandong province, China.

== See also ==
- Trimaran
- VPLP
