= Dart 18 =

Sailing catamaran class

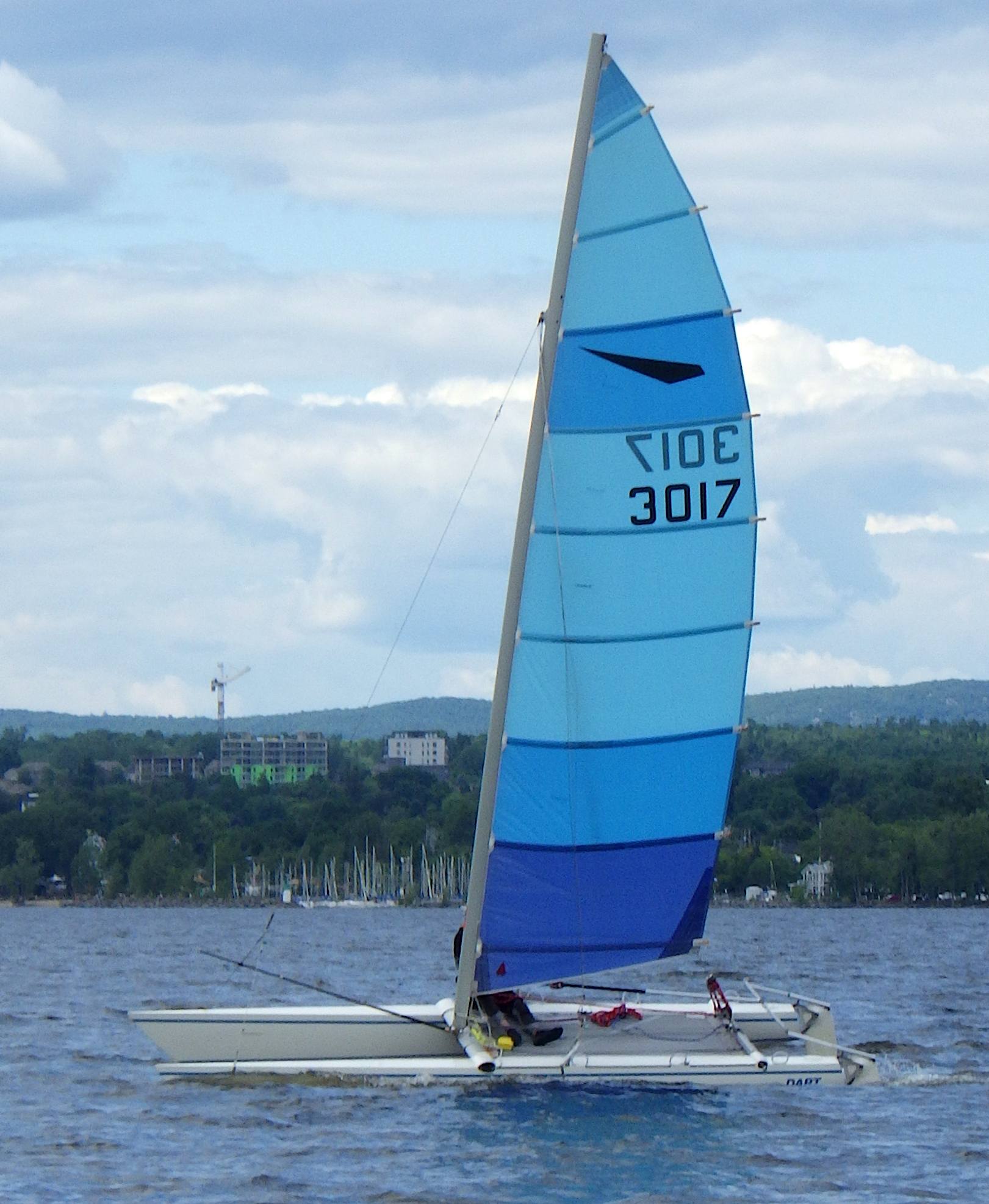
- Dart 18

Boat
- Crew: 2

Hull
- Hull weight: 130 kg
- LOA: 5,480 m (17,980 ft)
- Beam: 2,280 m (7,480 ft)

Rig
- Mast height: 8 m (26 ft)

Sails
- Mainsail area: 12.92 m^{2}
- Jib/genoa area: 3.16 m^{2}
- Spinnaker area: 15.5 m^{2}, not legal for racing

Racing
- D-PN: 76.3
- RYA PN: 805

The Dart 18 is a one-design 18-foot (5.5 m) long glassfibre sailing catamaran. It is designed to be sailed by two people and can achieve speeds of up to 20 knots. This is reflected in its Portsmouth Yardstick of 805 and D-PN of 76.3

== History ==
The Dart 18 was designed and built by Panthercraft, which was formed in 1969

The first Dart 18, designed and built in Falmouth, Cornwall, is now owned by the National Maritime Museum Cornwall. Up to the present, a number of improvements have been made, but the original concept was preserved through strict class rules. More than 8350 boats have been built up to 2016, which are sailed in more than 16 nations on 4 continents. Since 2012, Windsport International holds the worldwide licence to build the Dart 18.

The boats are manufactured since 2005 at Collins Fibreglass Plastics in South Africa and in Europe. The World Championship results can be found here.

== Design ==
The hulls of the Dart 18 are similar to most sailing catamarans, but without centreboards. Instead, the lower part of the hulls have skegs typical for a beach catamaran. The hull material is glassfibre. Both hulls are filled with flotation inserts to preserve buoyancy in case of damage. The inside of each hull can be reached through a hatch cover located at the rear of each hull. The boat is assembled by attaching the main and rear beams to the hulls with spring-loaded retaining clips, and lacing the trampoline to the beams and hulls. The two rudders are removable without tools, retract on impact with the beach, and can be locked in the up position.

The rigging consists of a rotating mast held by a forestay and two shroud wires. The shrouds can be adjusted by simply moving the bolts in the chainplates. The Dart 18 mast does not have spreaders. There is a trapeze for the crew.

The mainsail does not have a boom, has nine full battens, and is controlled by a main sheet with a 7:1 mechanical advantage. The jib sail has two short battens, and is controlled by a jib sheet with a 2:1 mechanical advantage. The main sheet block and both jib sheet blocks have a ratchet and a cleat.

A gennaker sail can be added, but is not legal for racing. This is usually combined with a jib furling system. The boat can also be sailed by one person, without a foresail, with a D-PN of 78.7.

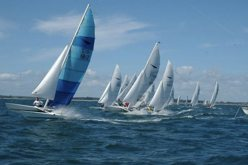

== See also ==
- List of multihulls
