= John Marples =

Multihull sailboat designer

John Marples (born 1944) is a multihull sailboat designer who collaborates with Jim Brown.

The pair are responsible for the Constant camber (1970s-present), Seaclipper (1970s-present) and Searunner (1960s-1970) series of trimarans.

== See also ==
- Trimaran
- Polyreme
