= Lagoon 560 =

Sailboat class

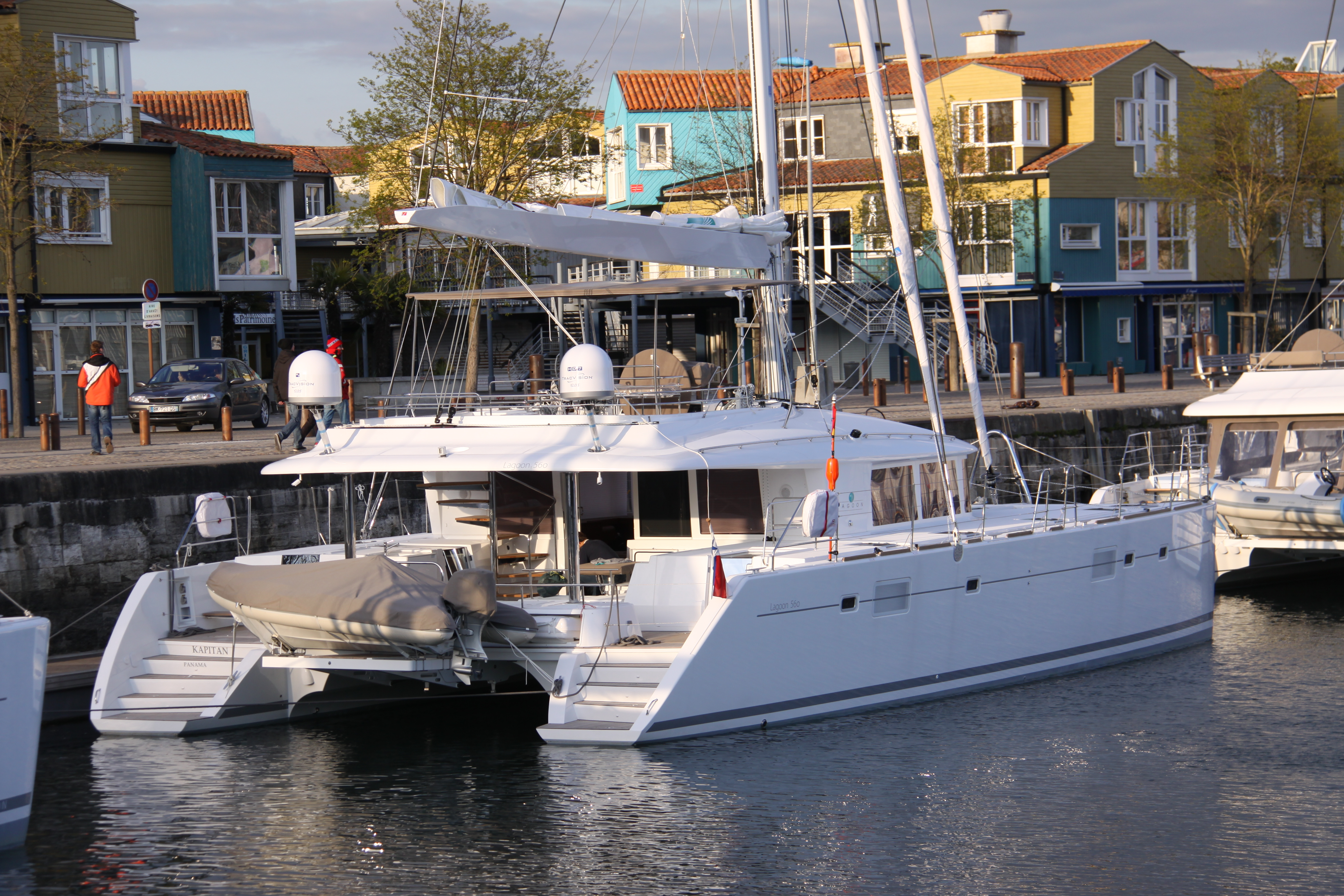

Development
- Designer: Van Peteghem/Lauriot-Prevost; Patrick le Quément; Nauta Design
- Location: France
- Year: 2010
- Builder: Lagoon Catamaran
- Role: Cruiser

Boat
- Displacement: 70,547 lb (32,000 kg)
- Draft: 4.92 ft (1.50 m)

Hull
- Type: catamaran
- Construction: fiberglass
- LOA: 56.00 ft (17.07 m)
- LWL: 54.00 ft (16.46 m)
- Beam: 30.97 ft (9.44 m)
- Engine: Two Yanmar Yanmar 2GM20 75 or 110 hp (56 or 82 kW) diesel engines

Hull appendages
- Keel: twin keels
- Rudder: spade-type rudders

Rig
- Rig type: Bermuda rig

Sails
- Sailplan: fractional rigged sloop
- Mainsail area: 1,356 sq ft (126.0 m^{2})
- Jib/genoa area: 872 sq ft (81.0 m^{2})
- Gennaker area: 2,530 sq ft (235 m^{2})
- Other sails: code 0: 1,507 sq ft (140.0 m^{2}) squre-head mainsail: 1,378 sq ft (128.0 m^{2})
- Upwind sail area: 2,228 sq ft (207.0 m^{2})
- Downwind sail area: 3,886 sq ft (361.0 m^{2})

The Lagoon 560 is a French sailboat that was designed by Van Peteghem/Lauriot-Prevost, with the exterior design by Patrick le Quément and interior design by Nauta Design. It was intended as an offshore cruiser and also for the yacht charter role and first built in 2010.

== Production ==
The design was built by Lagoon catamaran in France, from 2010 to 2019, but it is now out of production. An improved S2 version was produced from 2014.

The Lagoon 560 replaced the Lagoon 57 in the company product line.

== Design ==
The Lagoon 560 is a recreational catamaran, built predominantly of infused polyester fiberglass. It has solid fiberglass hulls below the waterline, with a balsa core above the waterline and in the deck. It has a fractional sloop rig, with a deck-stepped mast, two sets of swept spreaders and aluminum spars with 1X19 stainless steel wire rigging. The hulls have slightly raked stems, reverse transoms with swimming platforms, dual internally mounted spade-type rudders controlled by a wheel located on a large flying bridge and twin fixed fin keels. It displaces 70,547 lb (32,000 kg).

The boat has a draft of 4.92 ft (1.50 m) with the standard twin keels.

The boat is fitted with twin Japanese Yanmar diesel engines of 75 hp (56 kW) with saildrives or optionally 110 hp (82 kW) Yanmars with folding propellers. Unlike some smaller Lagoon siblings, which have saildrives mounted AFT of the rudders, the 560 model has V-drives to short prop-shafts, with the propellers sited FORWARD of the rudders. The two fuel tanks hold a total of 364 U.S. gallons (1,380 L; 303 imp gal) and the two fresh water tanks have a combined capacity of 252 U.S. gallons (950 L; 210 imp gal).

The design was built with several different interior layouts, with three to five cabins and sleeping accommodation for six to nine people. Each cabin has a private head. The galley may be located on the port side of the main salon or in the aft portion of the port hull. A forward facing navigation station is located in the front of the main salon and can be used to sail the boat from with the autopilot. The main salon may be fitted with one or two L-shaped settees. The aft cockpit lounge also has a U-shaped settee. Cabin maximum headroom is 80 in (203 cm).

For reaching or sailing downwind the design may be equipped with an asymmetrical spinnaker of 2,530 sq ft (235 m^{2}) or a code 0 sail of 1,507 sq ft (140.0 m^{2}).

The design has a hull speed of 10.03 kn (18.58 km/h).

== Operational history ==
In a 2011 Cruising World review, Mark Pillsbury wrote, "with accommodations on three levels, an overall length of 56 feet, and a beam of 31 feet, this latest entry from the world's largest catamaran builder was bigger than the house where my wife and I raised two children and a large dog. And with AC, a washer and dryer, a fridge, a freezer and icemaker, a built-in wine locker, and a master cabin complete with its own companionway, it looked to be a whole lot more comfortable. Plus, I'd discover a couple of days later, this cat could sail."

A Sail Magazine 2011 introductory review reported, "the latest boat from the world's largest catamaran builder replaces the long-in-the-tooth Lagoon 57 and joins the 500 and 620 in Lagoon's revamped flagship line. And flagship is about right; you'd need an 80ft monohull to get anywhere near the space you'll find on this big cruiser. "

In a 2012 review for Sail Magazine, Andrew Burton wrote, "out on Miami's Biscayne Bay, we hoisted the huge square-top main and unfurled the genoa, accelerating to a respectable 4.2 knots in 6.5 knots of true wind. That was fine for a while, but my French hosts wanted to play, so we unfurled a giant gennaker. Sailing at a true wind angle of 75 degrees, we were soon going almost as fast as the wind, with the twin hulls slicing cleanly through the slight chop."

== See also ==
- List of multihulls
- List of sailing boat types
