= Lagoon 40 =

Sailboat class

Development
- Designer: Van Peteghem/Lauriot-Prevost; Patrick le Quément; Nauta Design
- Location: France
- Year: 2017
- Builder: Lagoon Catamaran
- Role: Cruiser
- Name: Lagoon 40

Boat
- Displacement: 23,997 lb (10,885 kg)
- Draft: 4.43 ft (1.35 m)

Hull
- Type: catamaran
- Construction: fiberglass
- LOA: 38.52 ft (11.74 m)
- LWL: 37.96 ft (11.57 m)
- Beam: 22.18 ft (6.76 m)
- Engine: Two Yanmar 3YM30 29 or 45 hp (22 or 34 kW) diesel engines with saildrives

Hull appendages
- Keel: twin keels
- Rudder: spade-type rudders

Rig
- Rig type: Bermuda rig

Sails
- Sailplan: fractional rigged sloop
- Mainsail area: 511 sq ft (47.5 m^{2})
- Jib/genoa area: 364 sq ft (33.8 m^{2})
- Other sails: code 0: 706 sq ft (65.6 m^{2})
- Upwind sail area: 875 sq ft (81.3 m^{2})
- Downwind sail area: 1,217 sq ft (113.1 m^{2})

The Lagoon 40 is a French sailboat that was designed by Van Peteghem/Lauriot-Prevost with the exterior design by Patrick le Quément and interior design by Nauta Design. It was intended as a cruiser and for the yacht charter role and first built in 2017.

== Production ==
The design has been built by Lagoon catamaran in France since 2017 and remained in production in 2023.

The design replaced the Lagoon 39 and Lagoon 400 in the company product line.

== Design ==
The Lagoon 40 is a recreational catamaran, built predominantly of vacuum infused polyester fiberglass, with wood trim. The design is solid fiberglass below the waterline, with a balsa core above the waterline and in the deck. It has a fractional sloop rig, with a deck-stepped mast, one set of swept diamond spreaders and aluminum spars with 1X19 stainless steel wire rigging. The hulls have plumb stems, reverse transoms with swimming platforms, dual internally mounted spade-type rudders controlled by a wheel and twin fixed fin keels. It displaces 23,997 lb (10,885 kg).

The boat has a draft of 4.43 ft (1.35 m) with the standard twin keels

The boat is fitted with twin Japanese Yanmar 3YM30 diesel engines of 29 or 45 hp (22 or 34 kW) with saildrives, for docking and maneuvering. The fuel tank holds 106 U.S. gallons (400 L; 88 imp gal) and the fresh water tank has a capacity of 79 U.S. gallons (300 L; 66 imp gal).

The design has a number of different interior layouts with three of four cabins and sleeping accommodation for six to eight people. The three cabin interior has an "owner's" cabin in the port hull with a double berth aft, a lounge amidships and a large head with a shower forward. The starboard hull has a cabin fore and another aft with a shared head in between. The four cabin "charter" layout has cabins fore and aft in each hull with either small private heads amidships or one larger shared head. The main salon has an L-shaped settee and two seats. The galley is located on the port side of the salon, aft. The galley is L-shaped and is equipped with a four-burner stove, a refrigerator, freezer and a double sink. A navigation station is opposite the galley, on the starboard side, facing aft. The aft cockpit has additional seating, including a L-shaped settee. Cabin maximum headroom is 79 in (201 cm).

For sailing downwind the design may be equipped with a code 0 sail of 706 sq ft (65.6 m^{2}).

== Operational history ==
In a 2018 review for boats.com, Zuzana Prochazka wrote, "French catamaran builder, Lagoon, has been searching for the magic bullet for 20 years. With the new Lagoon 40, they may have found it. The dilemma has been how to replace their uber-popular 380 cat that launched over 800 hulls and is still in (limited) production. Couples loved the layout, size and price point of that model and every subsequent 40-footer has failed to pry that entry-level-seeking demographic fully away from the older design. But with the introduction of the new and agile 40, Lagoon may just be able to retire the old molds once and for all."

In a 2018 Sail Magazine review, Zuzana Prochazka wrote, "the key to sailing the Lagoon 40 is the 706 sq ft Code 0. With romping fun conditions outside Government Cut just off South Beach in Miami, we unfurled the large headsail and soon found ourselves touching 10 knots of boatspeed in 16-18 knots of true wind on a beam reach. As we hardened up to 50 degrees and the true wind dropped to 15 knots, we still held onto 7.9 knots. The important thing to note here is that this cat will keep her speed even at a 50-degree apparent wind angle, making her more than just a downwind cruiser."

A Katamarans review stated, "the Lagoon 40 has every chance of overtaking the 380 as Lagoon's best selling model as long as they don't launch another entry level boat any time soon."

== See also ==
- List of multihulls
- List of sailing boat types
