= Lagoon 380 =

Sailboat class

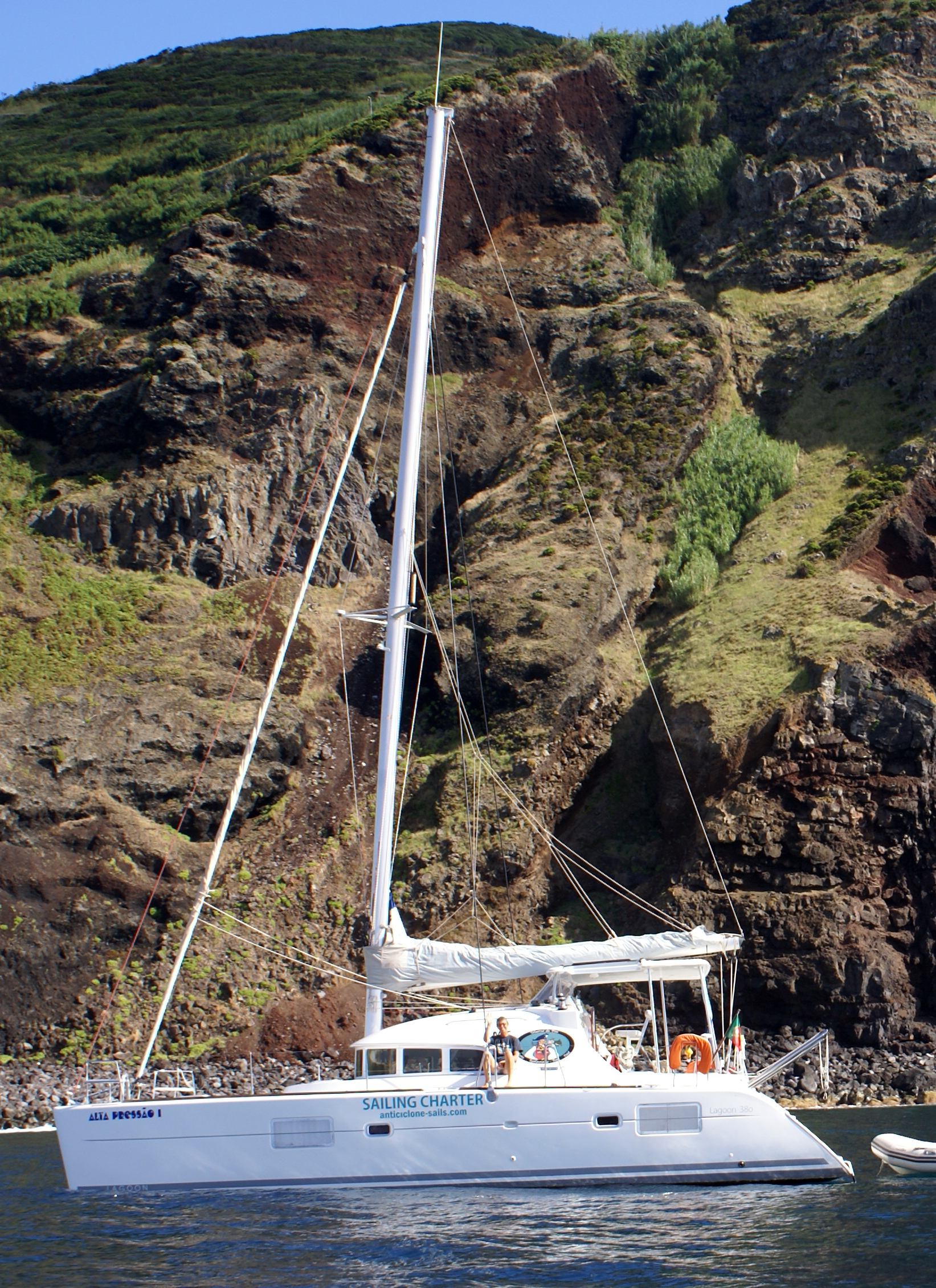

Development
- Designer: Van Peteghem/Lauriot-Prevost
- Location: France
- Year: 1999
- No. built: about 1,000
- Builders: Jeanneau; Construction Navale Bordeaux; Lagoon Catamaran
- Role: Cruiser
- Name: Lagoon 380

Boat
- Displacement: 16,005 lb (7,260 kg)
- Draft: 3.77 ft (1.15 m)

Hull
- Type: catamaran
- Construction: fiberglass
- LOA: 37.89 ft (11.55 m)
- LWL: 36.08 ft (11.00 m)
- Beam: 21.42 ft (6.53 m)
- Engine: twin Volvo or Yanmar 20 hp (15 kW) diesel engines

Hull appendages
- Keel: twin keels
- Ballast: none
- Rudder: twin rudders

Rig
- Rig type: Bermuda rig

Sails
- Sailplan: fractional rigged sloop
- Mainsail area: 560 sq ft (52 m^{2})
- Jib/genoa area: 323 sq ft (30.0 m^{2})
- Gennaker area: 570 sq ft (53 m^{2})
- Upwind sail area: 883 sq ft (82.0 m^{2})
- Downwind sail area: 1,130 sq ft (105 m^{2})

The Lagoon 380 is a French sailboat that was designed by Van Peteghem/Lauriot-Prevost as a cruiser and also for the yacht charter role. It was first built in 1999.

According to the website Katamarans, the Lagoon 380 is described as "the best-selling catamaran in the world" until the introduction of the Lagoon 42.

== Production ==
The design was built by the Lagoon catamaran division of Jeanneau in France and was the smallest catamaran in their product line. The division was later sold to Construction Navale Bordeaux (CNB) which became part of Groupe Beneteau. Production started in 1999 and the improved Lagoon 380 S2 model was introduced in 2003. Production ran until 2019 with about 1,000 boats completed.

The design was replaced in the line by the Lagoon 40.

== Design ==
The Lagoon 380 is a recreational catamaran, built predominantly of solid polyester fiberglass below the waterline, with portions above the waterline a polyester fiberglass and balsa or foam sandwich. The deck is a balsa sandwich. It has a fractional sloop masthead sloop rig, with a deck-stepped mast, one set of swept diamond spreaders and aluminum spars with continuous stainless steel wire rigging. The twin hulls have nearly plumb stems, reverse transoms with steps and swimming platforms, twin spade rudders controlled by a wheel and twin fixed keels. It displaces 16,005 lb (7,260 kg).

The boat has a draft of 3.77 ft (1.15 m) with the standard twin keels.

The boat is fitted with either two Swedish Volvo or two Japanese Yanmar diesel engines of 20 or 29 hp (15 or 22 kW) for docking and maneuvering. The fuel tank holds 58.2 U.S. gallons (220 L; 48.5 imp gal) and the fresh water tank has a capacity of 79.3 U.S. gallons (300 L; 66.0 imp gal).

A rigid bimini top became a standard item later in production.

The boat was built with either a three or four cabin layout for private or yacht charter use. Both arrangements have a main salon with an oval table and U-shaped seating around it. The galley is located in the aft starboard part of the main salon. The galley is equipped with a two-burner stove, an ice box and a double sink. A navigation station is opposite the galley, on the port side of the salon. On the four cabin layout there is a double berth fore and aft in each hull with a head in the center of each hull in between the cabins. The three cabin layout trades the starboard forward cabin for a larger head, while retaining the port side head. Cabin maximum headroom is 80 in (203 cm) in the main salon and 74 in (188 cm) in the cabins.

For sailing downwind the design may be equipped with an asymmetrical gennaker of 570 sq ft (53 m^{2}). The design has a hull speed of 8.05 kn (14.91 km/h).

The S2 model was introduced in 2003 and incorporated a number of small improvements, including a bigger shower area, improved shelving for storage, a redesigned galley and a double helm seat. Katamarans.com notes, "these were all minor changes, more of a marketing update if anything, and many prospective buyers prefer the older boats which have more storage, better quality interior finishes and easier access to the engines."

== Operational history ==
The Lagoon 380 has been used for ocean crossings and global circumnavigations.

A catamaranreviews.com review reported, "the Lagoon 380 has above average performance and can reach speeds up to 10 knots in strong winds. With the wider hulls, weight and low aspect keels, the Lagoon 380 performance significantly decreases as you get closer to apparent wind. It is also slow in lighter winds, and most sailors will prefer to motor."

A review in katamarans.com described the boat: "it isn't the quickest catamaran, she's slow to get going in light airs. She is not great going to windward with those fat hulls and fixed keels. 50 degrees to true is probably optimal, with leeway. At 45 degrees, the speed drops off and the leeway picks up ... the sail plan will happily cover you from anything from 9 knots of wind to 35. You should be averaging 7 knots SOG most of the time giving you 150 nm a day- perfectly acceptable for safe long distance cruising."

== See also ==
- List of multihulls
- List of sailing boat types
