= Lagoon 77 =

Sailboat class

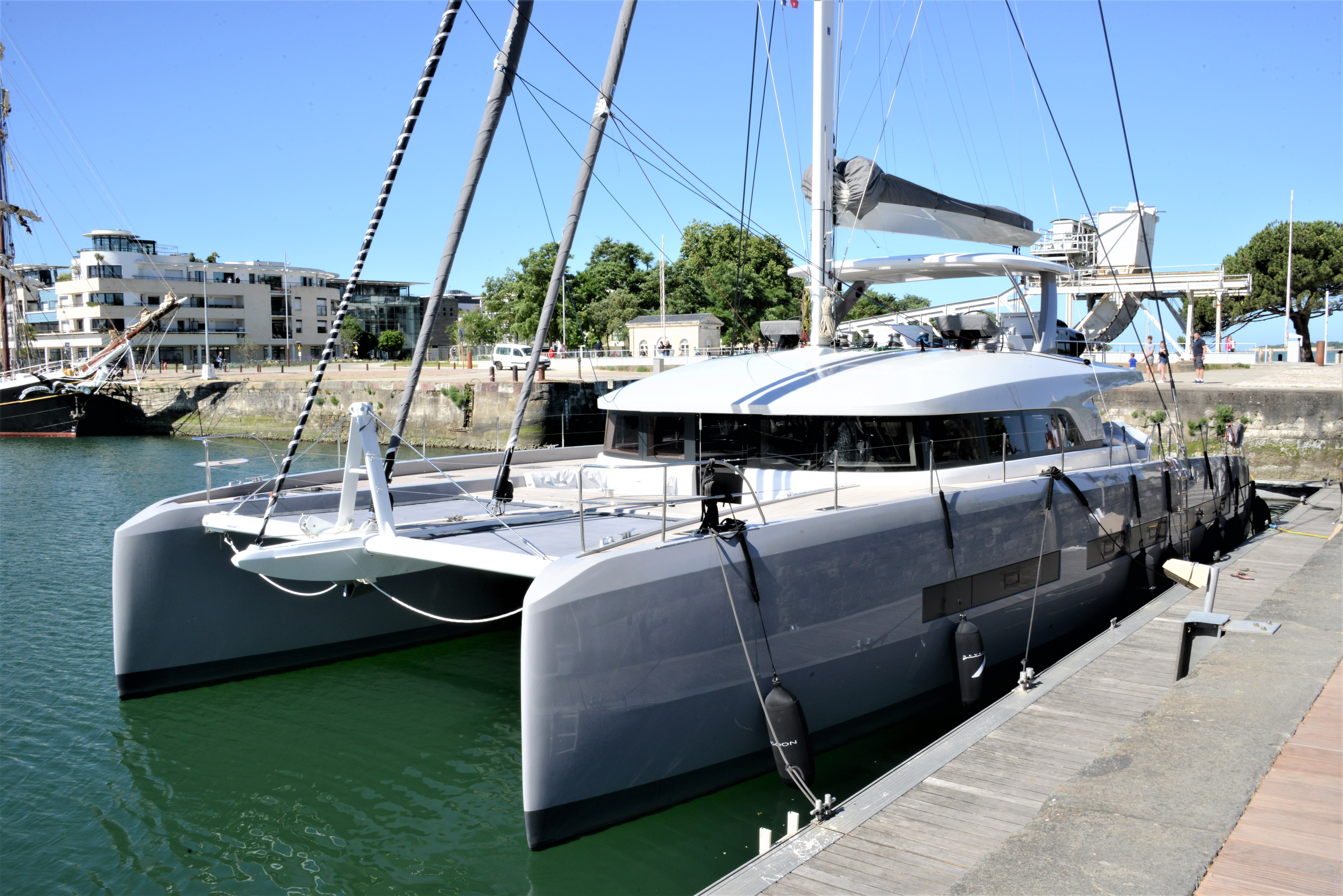

Development
- Designer: Van Peteghem/Lauriot-Prevost; Patrick le Quément; Nauta Design
- Location: France
- Year: 2017
- Builder: Lagoon Catamaran
- Role: Cruiser
- Name: Lagoon 77

Boat
- Displacement: 139,658 lb (63,348 kg)
- Draft: 6.25 ft (1.91 m)

Hull
- Type: catamaran
- Construction: fiberglass
- LOA: 78.22 ft (23.84 m)
- LWL: 75.62 ft (23.05 m)
- Beam: 36.09 ft (11.00 m)
- Engine: Two Volvo D4-175 175 hp (130 kW) diesel engines

Hull appendages
- Keel: twin keels
- Rudder: Twin spade-type rudders

Rig
- Rig type: Bermuda rig

Sails
- Sailplan: 9/10 fractional rigged sloop
- Mainsail area: 2,207 sq ft (205.0 m^{2})
- Jib/genoa area: 1,404 sq ft (130.4 m^{2})
- Gennaker area: 4,820 sq ft (448 m^{2})
- Other sails: code 0: 2,207 sq ft (205.0 m^{2})
- Upwind sail area: 3,610 sq ft (335 m^{2})
- Downwind sail area: 7,136 sq ft (663.0 m^{2})

The Lagoon 77, also marketed as the Lagoon Seventy 7, is a French sailboat that was designed by Van Peteghem/Lauriot-Prevost with the exterior design by Patrick le Quément and interior design by Nauta Design. It was intended as a cruiser and for the yacht charter role and first built in 2017.

The design has won numerous awards and is the largest boat built by Lagoon.

== Production ==
The design has been built by Lagoon catamaran in France, since 2017 and remained in production in 2023.

== Design ==
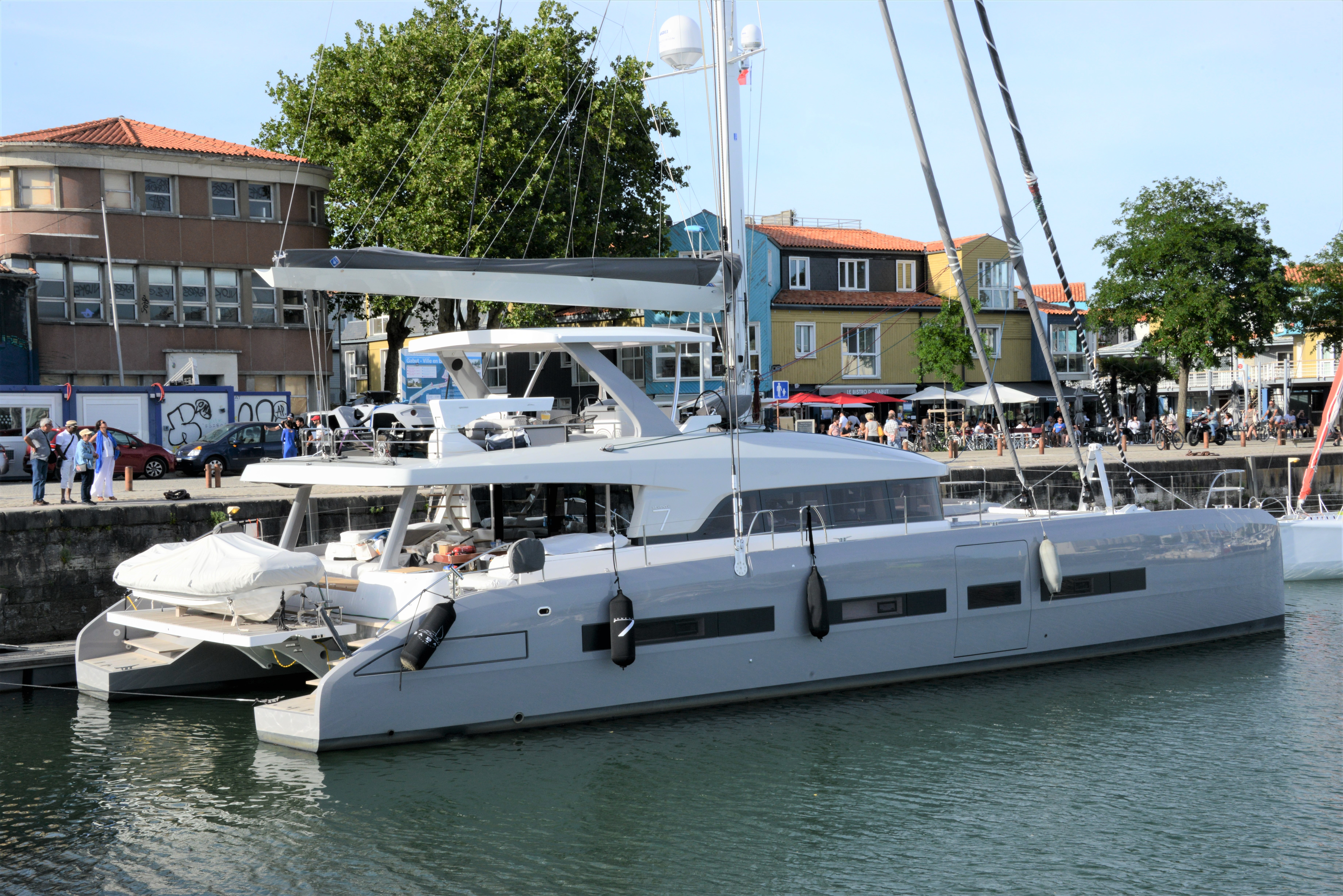
Lagoon 77

The Lagoon 77 is a recreational catamaran, built predominantly of vacuum infused polyester fiberglass, with wood trim. The design is solid fiberglass below the waterline, with a balsa core above the waterline and in the deck. It has a 9/10 fractional sloop rig, with a deck-stepped mast, three sets of swept diamond spreaders and aluminum spars. The forestay is stainless steel rod, while the shrouds are Kevlar. The hulls have plumb stems, reverse transoms with swimming platforms and a central boat lift, dual internally mounted spade-type rudders controlled by dual wheels on the flying bridge and twin fixed fin keels. It displaces 139,658 lb (63,348 kg) and normally is sailed by a professional crew.

The boat has a draft of 6.25 ft (1.91 m) with the standard twin keels.

The boat is fitted with twin Swedish Volvo D4-175 diesel engines of 175 hp (130 kW) or twin John Deere N5 230 hp (172 kW) diesel engines for docking and maneuvering. The fuel tank holds 740 U.S. gallons (2,800 L; 620 imp gal) and the fresh water tank has a capacity of 423 U.S. gallons (1,600 L; 352 imp gal).

The design is highly customizable and may fit four to six cabins, each with a private head, and providing sleeping accommodation for eight to twelve people. When a "owner's" cabin is fitted, it is located in the starboard hull and may include an optional fold out "veranda" with a swim ladder. The port hull can replace cabins with a massage room, a movie theater, a playroom, or a full conference room. Cabin maximum headroom is 86 in (218 cm).

For sailing downwind the design may be equipped with a code 0 sail of 2,207 sq ft (205.0 m^{2}) or an asymmetrical spinnaker of 4,820 sq ft (448 m^{2}).

== Operational history ==
A catamaranreviews.com review noted, "in conclusion, the Lagoon 77 catamaran with its optimum performance, extravagant living areas and exquisite facilities on board is one majestic catamaran to take to the sea – the worth of which is reflected in its price tag!"

Katamarans reported, "what I particularly like about this design, is how VPLP have created a sleek looking yacht while sticking to that Lagoon winning formula: comfortable, safe sailing platforms that use every inch of space available. Having a yacht like this at the top of their range can only help the Lagoon brand in the long run."

In a 2017 review for boats.com, Zuzana Prochazka wrote, "hull number-one of Lagoon’s new 77-footer, the SEVENTY 7, dominated the Miami boat show this winter. She rested at the dock, pulsating, almost breathing, as fingers pointed and mouths gaped open. Between her size and stand-out features, she commanded attention and sprouted lines of spectators wanting to inspect this newcomer. A big beastie, she’ll be the coveted domain of a lucky few enjoying crewed luxury whether in private ownership or on charter."

The topRik Team in their review of the yacht highlighted such advantages: "After all of our testing, we can tell you about the impressions that we received on the basis of our own experience and conversations with customers. A number of strengths of this model can be identified.

- Even at the early manufacturing stage, we are given a huge opportunity to choose a layout, additional options and almost complete customization.
- The opportunity to receive luxurious living conditions even a thousand miles away from civilization - a large amount of social and living space turn the yacht into a real floating palace.
- Full automation of ship management allows reducing the minimum crew size at sea to just three people, this is also facilitated by the most up-to-date technology used for the vessel's systems.
- Decent seaworthiness.
- Reliability of design, stability and great autonomy, which allows you to make transitions over long distances and fully commit to ocean voyages."

== See also ==
- List of multihulls
- List of sailing boat types
