= Lagoon 500 =

Sailboat class

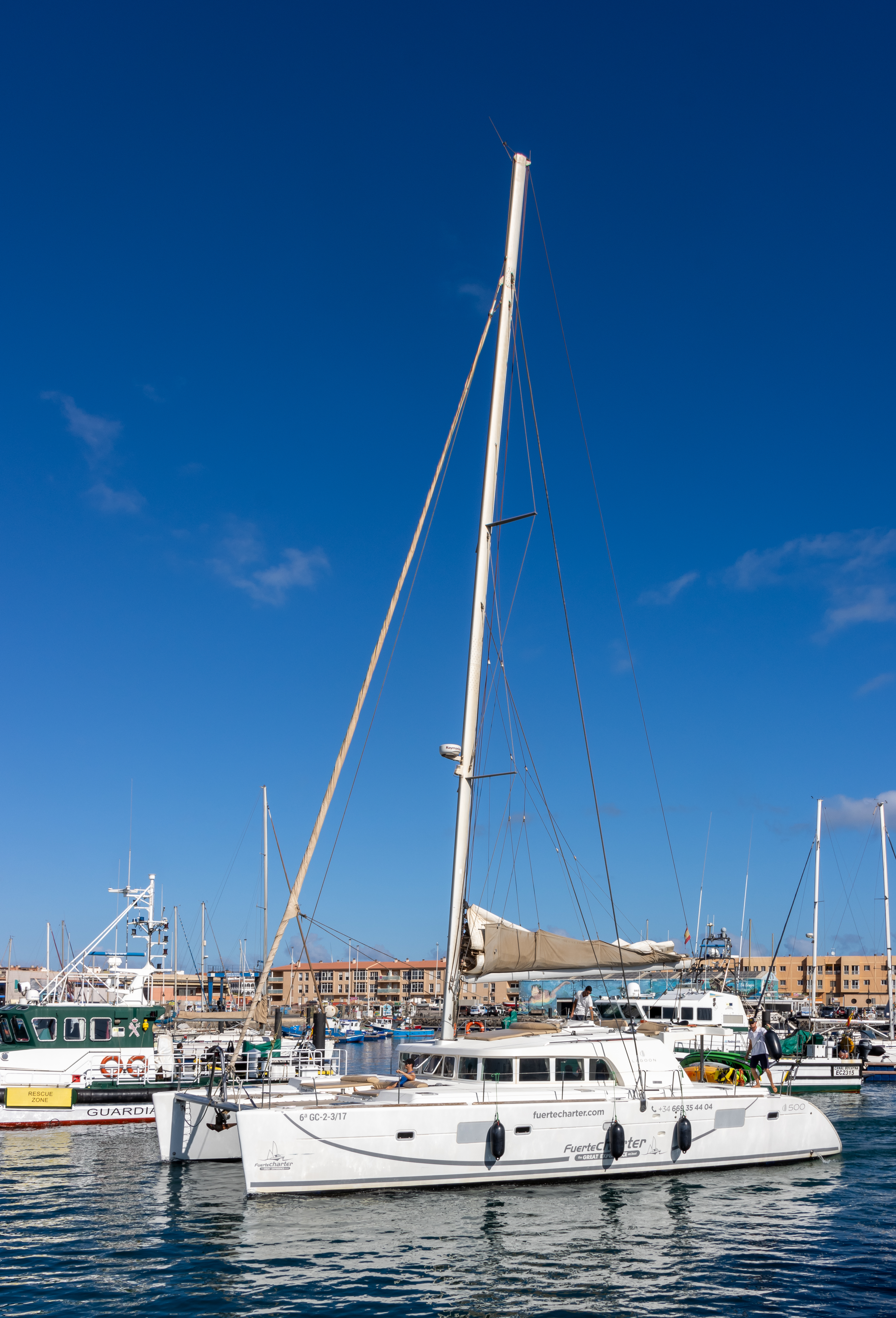

Development
- Designer: Van Peteghem/Lauriot-Prevost
- Location: France
- Year: 2005
- No. built: 150
- Builder: Lagoon Catamaran
- Role: Cruiser
- Name: Lagoon 500

Boat
- Displacement: 38,808 lb (17,603 kg)
- Draft: 4.58 ft (1.40 m)

Hull
- Type: catamaran
- Construction: fiberglass
- LOA: 51.00 ft (15.54 m)
- LWL: 49.00 ft (14.94 m)
- Beam: 28.00 ft (8.53 m)
- Engine: Two Yanmar 75 hp (56 kW) diesel engines

Hull appendages
- Keel: twin keels
- Rudder: Twin spade-type rudders

Rig
- Rig type: Bermuda rig

Sails
- Sailplan: fractional rigged sloop
- Mainsail area: 1,055 sq ft (98.0 m^{2})
- Jib/genoa area: 670 sq ft (62 m^{2})
- Gennaker area: 1,561 sq ft (145.0 m^{2})
- Upwind sail area: 1,724 sq ft (160.2 m^{2})
- Downwind sail area: 2,616 sq ft (243.0 m^{2})

The Lagoon 500 is a French sailboat that was designed by Van Peteghem/Lauriot-Prevost and first built in 2005.

== Production ==
The design was built by Lagoon catamaran in France, from 2005 to 2012.

The boat was replaced in the company product line by the Lagoon 52 in 2011.

== Design ==
The Lagoon 500 is a recreational catamaran. It has a fractional sloop rig, with a deck-stepped mast, two sets of swept spreaders and aluminum spars with 1X19 stainless steel wire rigging. The hulls have raked stems, reverse transoms with swimming platforms, dual internally mounted spade-type rudders controlled by a wheel on a flying bridge and twin fixed fin keels. Base specifications state displacement of 38,808 lb (17,603 kg).

The boat has a draft of 4.58 ft (1.40 m) with the standard twin keels.

The boat is fitted with either 55 hp (41 kW) or 75 hp (56 kW) diesel engines, with saildrives. Fuel capacity is 254 U.S. gallons (960 L; 211 imp gal) and fresh water capacity is 254 U.S. gallons (960 L; 211 imp gal).

The design has three to five cabins. The main salon has an L-shaped settee while the rear cockpit lounge has a U-shaped settee. The galley is located on the port side of the main salon and is U-shaped. Cabin maximum headroom is 80 in (203 cm).

== Operational history ==
In a 2005 Sail Magazine review noted, "following up on their successful Lagoon 440 catamaran, the Peteghem-Prevost design team has created a 51-footer that will be available with several options—an owner's version with a three- or a four-cabin arrangement and a charter version with four or five cabins."

In a 2006 Cruising World review, Jeremy McGeary wrote, "with sheets eased, the Lagoon 500 behaved as though 20 knots of wet wind were nothing, zooming along at 10 knots and over, steady as a ferryboat, and giving a preview of how it would devour the passages that lie between the Caribbean’s Windward Islands."

In a review for Cruising Sea, Daniella Wender wrote, "the Lagoon 500 is a conscientiously designed vessel that employs the sailing techniques of larger Lagoon models into a more compact vessel. The 500 is ideal for cruising but is not built for excessive speeds."

== See also ==
- List of multihulls
- List of sailing boat types
