= Lagoon 52 =

Sailboat class

Development
- Designer: Van Peteghem/Lauriot-Prevost; Patrick le Quément; Nauta Design
- Location: France
- Year: 2011
- Builder: Lagoon Catamaran
- Role: Cruiser

Boat
- Displacement: 57,403 lb (26,038 kg)
- Draft: 5.08 ft (1.55 m)

Hull
- Type: catamaran
- Construction: fiberglass
- LOA: 52.00 ft (15.85 m)
- LWL: 51.16 ft (15.59 m)
- Beam: 28.67 ft (8.74 m)
- Engine: Two 57 hp (43 kW) diesel engines

Hull appendages
- Keel: twin keels
- Rudder: Twin spade-type rudders

Rig
- Rig type: Bermuda rig

Sails
- Sailplan: fractional rigged sloop
- Mainsail area: 1,044 sq ft (97.0 m^{2})
- Jib/genoa area: 635 sq ft (59.0 m^{2})
- Gennaker area: 2,744 sq ft (254.9 m^{2})
- Other sails: genoa: 753 sq ft (70.0 m^{2}) square topped mainsail: 1,151 sq ft (106.9 m^{2}) staysail: 473 sq ft (43.9 m^{2}) code 0: 1,636 sq ft (152.0 m^{2})
- Upwind sail area: 1,905 sq ft (177.0 m^{2})
- Downwind sail area: 3,897 sq ft (362.0 m^{2})

The Lagoon 52 is a French sailboat that was designed by Van Peteghem/Lauriot-Prevost, with the exterior design by Patrick le Quément and interior by the Italian firm Nauta Design. It was intended as a cruiser and for the yacht charter role and first built in 2011.

== Production ==
The design was built by Lagoon catamaran in France, from 2011 to 2022, but it is now out of production.

== Design ==
The Lagoon 52 is a recreational catamaran, built predominantly of polyester fiberglass sandwich construction, with wood trim. The lower hulls are solid infused fiberglass while above the waterline and the decks are resin-infused fibreglass over a balsa core. It has a fractional sloop rig, with a deck-stepped mast, two sets of swept diamond spreaders and aluminum spars with 1X19 stainless steel wire rigging. The hulls have plumb stems, reverse transoms with swimming platforms, dual internally mounted spade-type rudders controlled by a wheel and twin fixed fin keels. It displaces 57,403 lb (26,038 kg).

The boat was built in two models, the Lagoon 52 F with a full-width flying bridge and the Lagoon 52 S "Sportop", with a raised helm station to port and aft of the salon with a rigid bimini top.

The boat has a draft of 5.08 ft (1.55 m) with the standard twin keels.

The boat is fitted with twin 57 or 80 hp (43 or 60 kW) diesel engines for docking and maneuvering. The fuel tank holds 262 U.S. gallons (990 L; 218 imp gal) and the fresh water tank has a capacity of 253 U.S. gallons (960 L; 211 imp gal).

The design has a large number of interior layouts, with three to six cabins providing sleeping accommodation for six to 14 people. In all interiors each cabin has its own head with a shower. The main salon has an L-shaped settee and a forward facing navigation station. The galley is located on the port side of the salon. The galley is U-shaped and is equipped with a four-burner stove, a refrigerator, freezer and a double sink. The cockpit lounge has additional seating, including a U-shaped settee. Cabin maximum headroom is 85 in (216 cm).

For sailing downwind the design may be equipped with an asymmetrical spinnaker of 2,744 sq ft (254.9 m^{2}) or a code 0 sail of 1,636 sq ft (152.0 m^{2}).

== Operational history ==
In a 2013 Cruising World review, Herb McCormick wrote, "When one is perched behind the articulating wheel (it can either be centred or cocked slightly to port or starboard) of the 52 on the expansive flybridge, the wide, commanding view is spectacular, as is the powerful performance. With a full crew of talented sailors aboard for our test run in the open ocean off Miami (at one point, there were seven of us on the bridge, and it was most definitely not crowded), I did my best, from my second-story vantage point, to keep them hopping. Working through the headsail progressions, under genoa and full main, in about 17 knots of true wind, our closehauled speeds ranged from 8.5 to 10 knots. But when we swapped the working sail for the gargantuan code zero reacher and spun the wheel down a few degrees, the 52 really took off, making a solid 12 knots with ease."

In a 2014 review in Sail Magazine, Tom Dove wrote, "Although you might not immediately notice the differences between this boat and its predecessors, they are dramatic. For example, moving the mast back to the 43 percent point to get a larger foretriangle required moving the center of buoyancy of the hulls aft as well. That, in turn, meant reshaping the hulls and making the bows sharper, not to mention adjusting the overall center of lateral resistance to keep the boat balanced with the big jib and small mainsail. Moving the mast aft also required some kind of new support, as the main bulkhead at the forward end of the saloon is no longer usable as a base. That meant creating an entirely new support structure: which Lagoon has done in the form of a big, stiff, reinforced grid concealed within the cabin and hull, and a strong compression post in the middle of the boat"

In a 2015 Cruising Sea review, Daniella Wender wrote, "Overall, the 52 has been vastly improved by Lagoon’s redesign. Compared to other vessels of the same size, the 52 has more space and comfort without compromising the performance, stability, and safety of the vessel. The design may not appeal to every sailor, which is why there are so many designs from which to choose."

A 2021 review for yacht4less, stated, "with the Lagoon 52, you get unrivalled performance, as well as comfort and safety."

== See also ==
- List of multihulls
- List of sailing boat types
