= Lagoon 570 =

Sailboat class

Development
- Designer: Van Peteghem/Lauriot-Prevost
- Location: France
- Year: 2000
- Builders: Construction Navale Bordeaux; Lagoon Catamaran
- Role: Cruiser
- Name: Lagoon 570

Boat
- Displacement: 33,025 lb (14,980 kg)
- Draft: 4.58 ft (1.40 m)

Hull
- Type: catamaran
- Construction: fiberglass
- LOA: 55.92 ft (17.04 m)
- LWL: 52.00 ft (15.85 m)
- Beam: 30.00 ft (9.14 m)
- Engine: Two Yanmar 56 hp (42 kW) diesel engines

Hull appendages
- Keel: twin keels
- Rudder: Twin skeg-mounted/internally-mounted spade-type/transom-mounted rudders

Rig
- Rig type: Bermuda rig

Sails
- Sailplan: fractional rigged sloop
- Mainsail area: 1,119 sq ft (104.0 m^{2})

The Lagoon 570 is a French sailboat that was designed by Van Peteghem/Lauriot-Prevost as a cruiser and first built in 2000.

== Production ==
The design was built by the Lagoon catamaran division of Construction Navale Bordeaux (CNB) in France, from 2000 to 2008, but it is now out of production.

Half of the boat's production went to private owners and half to yacht charter operators.

== Design ==
The boat was the result of more than 8,000 hours of research and development effort and replaced the Lagoon 57 in production.

The Lagoon 570 is a recreational catamaran, built predominantly of vacuum bag molded vinylester fiberglass with a balsa core and teak trim. It has a fractional sloop rig, with a deck-stepped mast, two sets of swept spreaders and aluminum spars with continuous stainless steel wire rigging. The hulls have slightly raked stems, reverse transoms with swimming platforms, dual internally mounted spade-type fiberglass rudders controlled by dual wheels and twin fixed fin keels. It displaces 33,025 lb (14,980 kg).

The boat has a draft of 4.58 ft (1.40 m) with the standard twin keels.

The boat is fitted with twin Japanese Yanmar diesel engines of 56 hp (42 kW) each for docking and maneuvering. The fuel tank holds 200 U.S. gallons (760 L; 170 imp gal) and the fresh water tank has a capacity of 1,200 U.S. gallons (4,500 L; 1,000 imp gal).

In charter configuration, the design has sleeping accommodation for ten people, with a double berth cabins in the bow and stern of each hull, plus one extra double berth aft to starboard. The main salon has an L-shaped settee and a round settee. The galley is located on the port side of the salon. The galley is of straight configuration and is equipped with a stove, an ice box and a double sink. A navigation station forward in the salon. There are five heads, one for each cabin.

For sailing downwind the design may be equipped with an asymmetrical gennaker.

The design has a hull speed of 9.66 kn (17.89 km/h).

== Operational history ==
In a 2002 Cruising World review, Tim Murphy wrote, "the helm placement at the cockpit's aft outboard corner is a compromise between the bulkhead-mounted steering stations of a Prout, Fountaine Pajot, or Perry and Catana's fully exposed helm station at the aft end of the hulls. From the Lagoon's helm, you have a good view of the main and some protection from the cockpit bimini, although the cabin top obscures part of the view directly ahead; you find yourself alternately looking over and through the cabin. 'On a vessel that goes 10 knots, you want a good view from the helm,' said Boat of the Year judge Ralph Naranjo."

In a Cruising Sea review, Daniella Wender wrote, "the 570 displays considerable power and handles well in moderate winds. I was surprised that the controls only took a light hand and were very easy to get the hang of before I felt completely comfortable at the helm."

In a 2002 review for Sailing Magazine, John Kretschmer wrote, "I brought the boat up onto a close reach, and with apparent winds of 12 knots, we touched 9 on the speedo. We were sailing with the genoa and staysail, and coming up a bit farther, I was impressed that we could keep the speed up while sailing at 50 degrees apparent. The helm was light and balanced. Coming through the wind is slower on a multihull than with a monohull, and for best results requires a little backing of the headsail, but the quick acceleration makes up for slow tacking. According to the skipper, the 570 reaches at around 8 knots in 10 knots true, and easily hits more than 10 knots in a 20-knot wind."

== See also ==
- List of multihulls
- List of sailing boat types
