= Lagoon 65 =

Sailboat class

Development
- Designer: Van Peteghem/Lauriot-Prevost; Patrick le Quément; Nauta Design
- Location: France
- Year: 2019
- Builder: Lagoon Catamaran
- Role: Cruiser
- Name: Lagoon 65

Boat
- Displacement: 88,185 lb (40,000 kg)
- Draft: 5.09 ft (1.55 m)

Hull
- Type: catamaran
- Construction: fiberglass
- LOA: 67.42 ft (20.55 m)
- LWL: 63.32 ft (19.30 m)
- Beam: 32.81 ft (10.00 m)
- Engine: Two Volvo D3-150 150 hp (112 kW) diesel engines

Hull appendages
- Keel: twin keels
- Rudder: spade-type rudders

Rig
- Rig type: Bermuda rig

Sails
- Sailplan: fractional rigged sloop
- Mainsail area: 1,835 sq ft (170.5 m^{2})
- Jib/genoa area: 1,054 sq ft (97.9 m^{2})
- Upwind sail area: 2,889 sq ft (268.4 m^{2})

The Lagoon 65, marketed as the Lagoon Sixty 5, is a French sailboat that was designed by Van Peteghem/Lauriot-Prevost with the exterior design by Patrick le Quément and interior design by Nauta Design. It was intended as a cruiser for private ownership and also for the yacht charter role, and first built in 2019.

The boat is the sailing version of the Lagoon 67 powerboat.

== Production ==
The design has been built by Lagoon catamaran in France, since 2019 and remained in production in 2023.

== Design ==
The Lagoon 65 is a recreational catamaran, built predominantly of vacuum infused polyester fiberglass, with wood trim including teak decks. The design is solid fiberglass below the waterline, with a balsa core above the waterline and in the deck. It has a fractional sloop rig, with a deck-stepped mast, two sets of swept diamond spreaders and aluminum mast and carbon fiber boom with stainless steel wire rigging. A carbon fiber mast is optional. The hulls have plumb stems, reverse transoms with swimming platforms, a central aft boat lift, dual internally mounted spade-type rudders controlled by dual wheels on a flying bridge and twin fixed fin keels. It displaces 88,185 lb (40,000 kg).

The boat has a draft of 5.09 ft (1.55 m) with the standard twin keels.

The boat is fitted with twin Swedish Volvo D3-150/D4-175 diesel engines of 150 or 195 hp (112 or 145 kW) with folding propellers, for docking and maneuvering. The fuel tank holds 344 U.S. gallons (1,300 L; 286 imp gal) and the fresh water tank has a capacity of 264 U.S. gallons (1,000 L; 220 imp gal).

The design has been built with several different interiors with four or five cabins, providing sleeping accommodation for eight to ten people. In all interiors each cabin has a private head with a shower. The main salon has an L-shaped settee. The galley is located on the port side of the salon. The galley has an island and is equipped with a stove, a refrigerator, freezer and sink. A navigation station is forward in the salon, on the port side and the boat can be sailed from there using the autopilot. Additional seating is located in the aft cockpit lounge, on the flying bridge and forward of the coach house.

For reaching or sailing downwind, the design may be equipped with a code 0 sail.

== Operational history ==
Naval architect Marc Van Peteghem of VPLP design, wrote of his design, "the Sixty 5 is a yacht on a human scale. I am a sailor at heart and there was no way the Sixty 5 wasn’t going to be a really easy to use yacht that you could cruise far and wide under sail in comfort and with seakeeping qualities inherited from her big sister. I dream of going long term cruising on this boat. Her long legs allow you to eat up the miles and then you can enjoy her comfort at stopovers."

In a 2019 review for Bluewater Sailing, Sandy Parks wrote, "the Sixty 5 is a Luxury yacht but built on a production line. Lagoon has perfected the art and science of building yachts both efficiently and with offshore sailing and long term durability in mind. Many Lagoons have made trans-oceanic passages either with their owners or when delivered to the charter fleets around the world."

In a 2022 Cruising World review, Herb McCormick wrote, "Lagoon is presently building about 20 boats a year. All have gone to private owners, not charter companies, though many owners are offering their boats with full crews from five to 10 weeks a year, to offset expenses. It’s a business model that’s tried-and-true with the superyacht set. The Sixty 5 is a lot of boat to handle, and nearly all owners will employ a hired captain, and chef and mate, who have their own dedicated quarters aboard."

== See also ==
- List of multihulls
- List of sailing boat types
