= Lagoon 400 =

Sailboat class

Development
- Designer: Van Peteghem/Lauriot-Prevost
- Location: France
- Year: 2009
- No. built: 264 (excluding S2)
- Builder: Lagoon Catamaran
- Role: Cruiser
- Name: Lagoon 400

Boat
- Displacement: 22,531 lb (10,220 kg)
- Draft: 3.97 ft (1.21 m)

Hull
- Type: catamaran
- Construction: fiberglass
- LOA: 39.27 ft (11.97 m)
- LWL: 37.57 ft (11.45 m)
- Beam: 23.79 ft (7.25 m)
- Engine: Two 29 hp (22 kW) diesel engines

Hull appendages
- Keel: twin keels
- Rudder: Twin spade-type rudders

Rig
- Rig type: Bermuda rig

Sails
- Sailplan: fractional rigged sloop masthead sloop
- Mainsail area: 603 sq ft (56.0 m^{2})
- Jib/genoa area: 301 sq ft (28.0 m^{2})
- Gennaker area: 818 sq ft (76.0 m^{2})
- Upwind sail area: 903 sq ft (83.9 m^{2})
- Downwind sail area: 1,421 sq ft (132.0 m^{2})

The Lagoon 400 is a French sailboat that was designed by Van Peteghem/Lauriot-Prevost as a cruiser and first built in 2009.

The boat is a development of the 1997 Lagoon 410.

== Production ==
The design was built by Lagoon catamaran in France, 2009 to 2012 with 264 boats completed and then in its improved S2 version from 2012 to 2017, but it is now out of production.

== Design ==
The Lagoon 400 is a recreational catamaran, built predominantly of polyester fiberglass, with wood trim. It has a fractional sloop rig, with a deck-stepped mast, two sets of swept diamond spreaders and aluminum spars with 1X19 stainless steel wire rigging. A bowsprit and square-headed mainsail were optional. The hulls have nearly plumb stems, reverse transoms with swimming platforms, dual internally mounted spade-type rudders controlled by a wheel and twin fixed fin keels. The original production version displaces 22,531 lb (10,220 kg) and the S2 version displaces 22,818 lb (10,350 kg).

The improved S2 model introduced improved galley cupboard storage, a new electrical panel and changes to the cabin layouts, as well as other minor interior cosmetic changes.

The boat has a draft of 3.97 ft (1.21 m) with the standard twin keels.

The boat is fitted with twin Yanmar diesel engines of 29 or 40 hp (22 or 30 kW) each, for docking and maneuvering. The fuel tank holds 106 U.S. gallons (400 L; 88 imp gal) and the fresh water tank has a capacity of 79 U.S. gallons (300 L; 66 imp gal).

The design has sleeping accommodation for four to eight people with up to four cabins, with double berth cabins fitted fore and aft in each hull. The main salon has an L-shaped settee plus there is a U-shaped settee in the cockpit. The galley is located in the salon on the starboard side. The galley is L-shaped and is equipped with a three-burner stove, an ice box and a double sink. A navigation station is opposite the galley, on the port side. Two to four heads can be fitted in the hulls. Cabin maximum headroom is 84 in (213 cm).

For sailing downwind the design may be equipped with a gennaker of 818 sq ft (76.0 m^{2}) or a code 0 sail.

The design has a hull speed of 8.21 kn (15.20 km/h).

== Operational history ==
In a review, katamarans.com reported, "the 400 is one of Lagoon's 3rd generation designs that evolved from their classic 410. Although Lagoon veered to more comfort over performance in this generation, the 400 is still a competent sailor in a breeze, but she's no lightweight and struggles in lighter airs (under 10 knots) unless you have the bowsprit to fly the larger sails (gennaker, code 0 for example)."

In a 2010 Cruising World review, Steve Callahan wrote, "under sail, the 400 also tacks well. The small jib is a cinch to handle, and with the roll-up screecher, one gains a simple and minimal sail plan that's very easy to power up or down. That said, 75 inches of freeboard to the deck plus a high superstructure and low-aspect keels mean this is a boat that shouldn't be pinched up; it performs best when sailed fully powered and backed off a few degrees from a closehauled heading."

In a review for Cruising Sea, Daniella Wender wrote, "it's not much of a vacation if the boat is too cramped or passengers are falling over each other, but at the same time, the 400 invites social activity and conversation, almost creating the illusion that the entire vessel is a floating family rec room."

== See also ==
- List of multihulls
- List of sailing boat types
