= Lagoon 620 =

Sailboat class

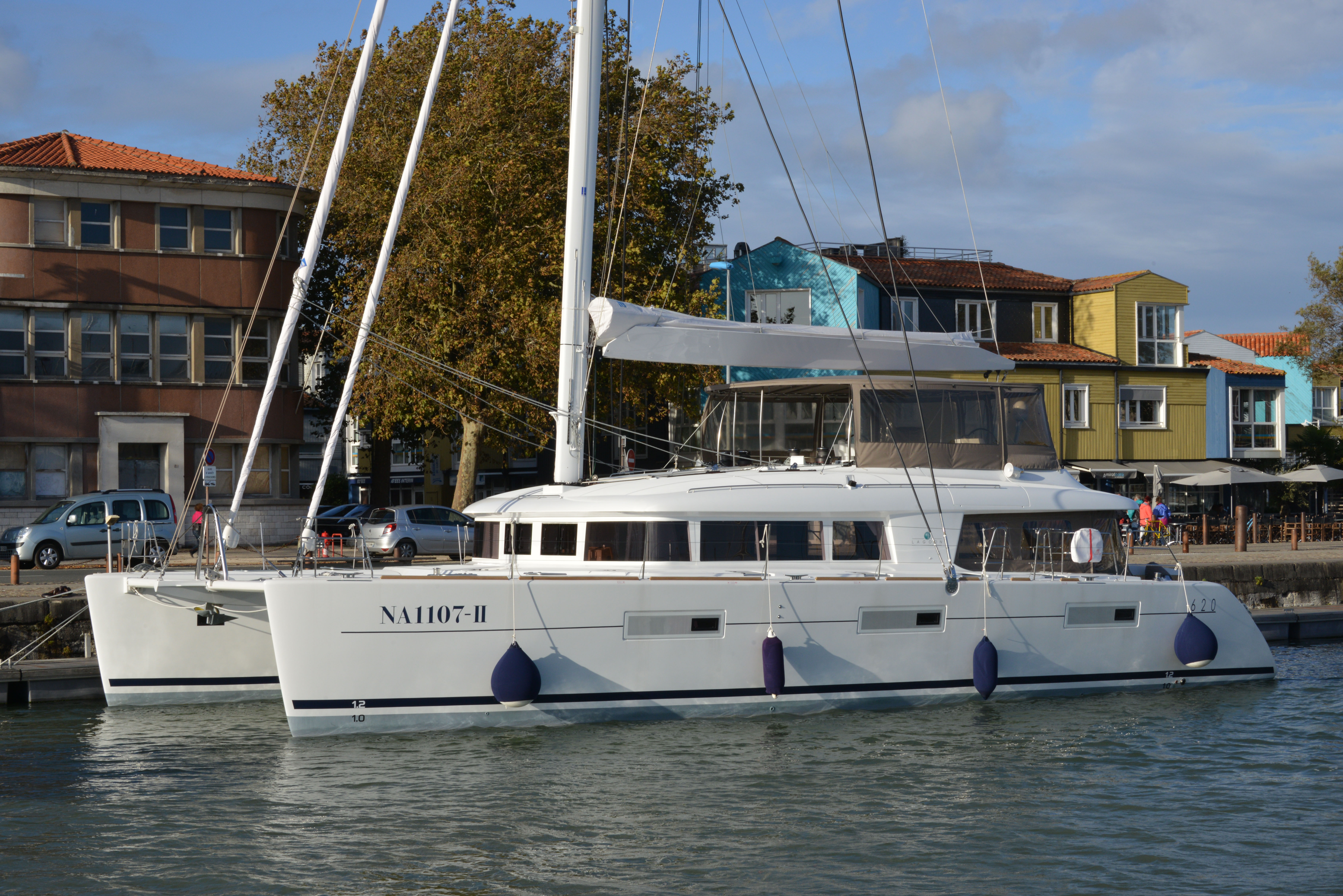

Development
- Designer: Van Peteghem/Lauriot-Prevost; Patrick le Quément; Nauta Design
- Location: France
- Year: 2009
- Builder: Lagoon Catamaran
- Role: Cruiser
- Name: Lagoon 620

Boat
- Displacement: 71,076 lb (32,240 kg)
- Draft: 5.09 ft (1.55 m)

Hull
- Type: catamaran
- Construction: fiberglass
- LOA: 62.04 ft (18.91 m)
- LWL: 59.71 ft (18.20 m)
- Beam: 32.81 ft (10.00 m)
- Engine: Two 110 hp (82 kW) diesel engines

Hull appendages
- Keel: twin keels
- Rudder: Twin internally-mounted spade-type rudders

Rig
- Rig type: Bermuda rig

Sails
- Sailplan: fractional rigged sloop
- Mainsail area: 1,572 sq ft (146.0 m^{2})
- Jib/genoa area: 980 sq ft (91 m^{2})
- Spinnaker area: 3,229 sq ft (300.0 m^{2})
- Gennaker area: 2,045 sq ft (190.0 m^{2})
- Other sails: Code 0: 1,991 sq ft (185.0 m^{2})
- Upwind sail area: 2,552 sq ft (237.1 m^{2})
- Downwind sail area: 4,801 sq ft (446.0 m^{2})

The Lagoon 620 is a French sailboat that was designed by Van Peteghem/Lauriot-Prevost, with exterior design by Patrick le Quément and interior design by Nauta Design. It was designed as a cruiser and first built in 2009.

== Production ==
The design was built by Lagoon catamaran in France, from 2009 to 2019, but it is now out of production.

The boat went through a design update in 2012, that included an interior redesign.

== Design ==
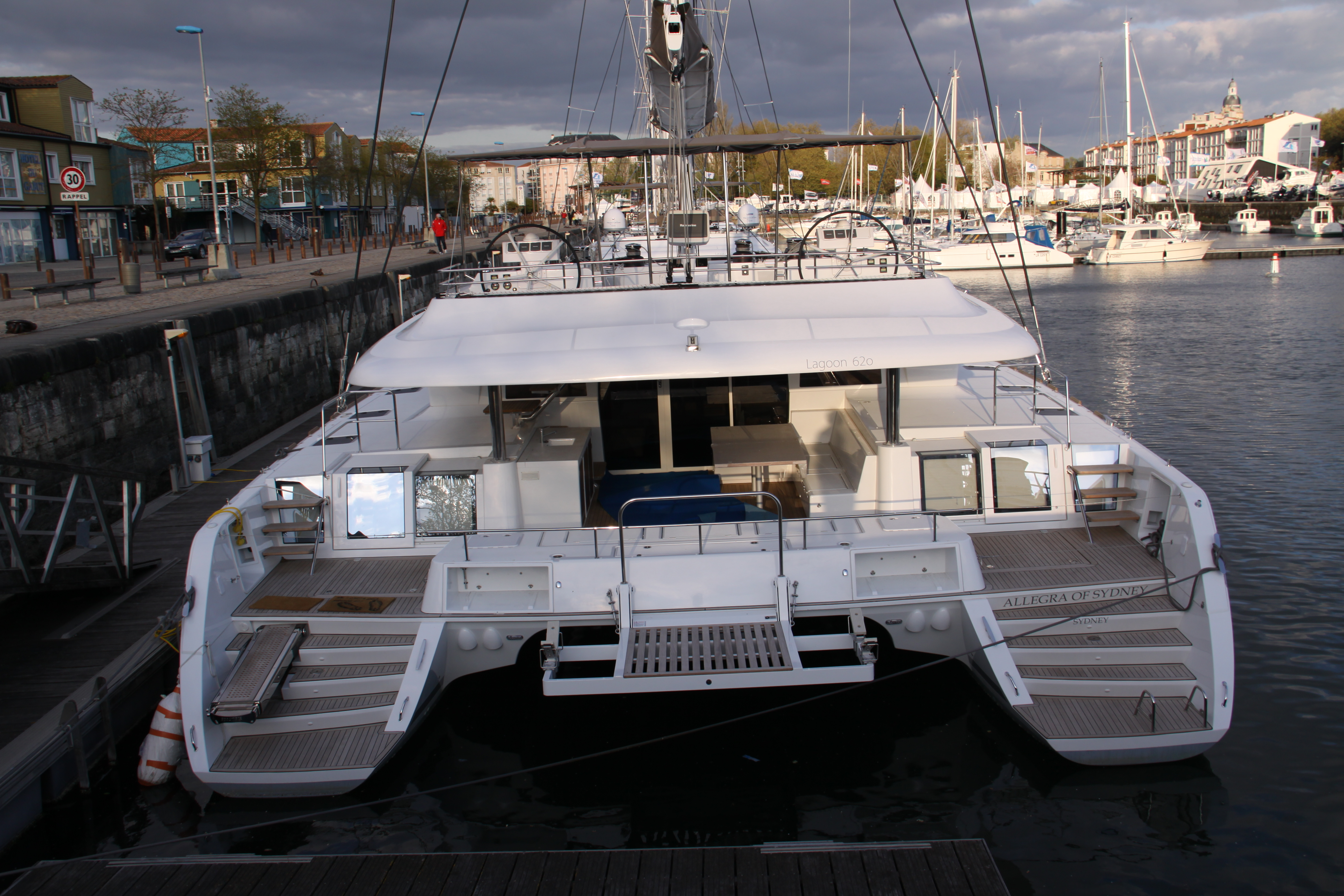
Lagoon 620 stern view

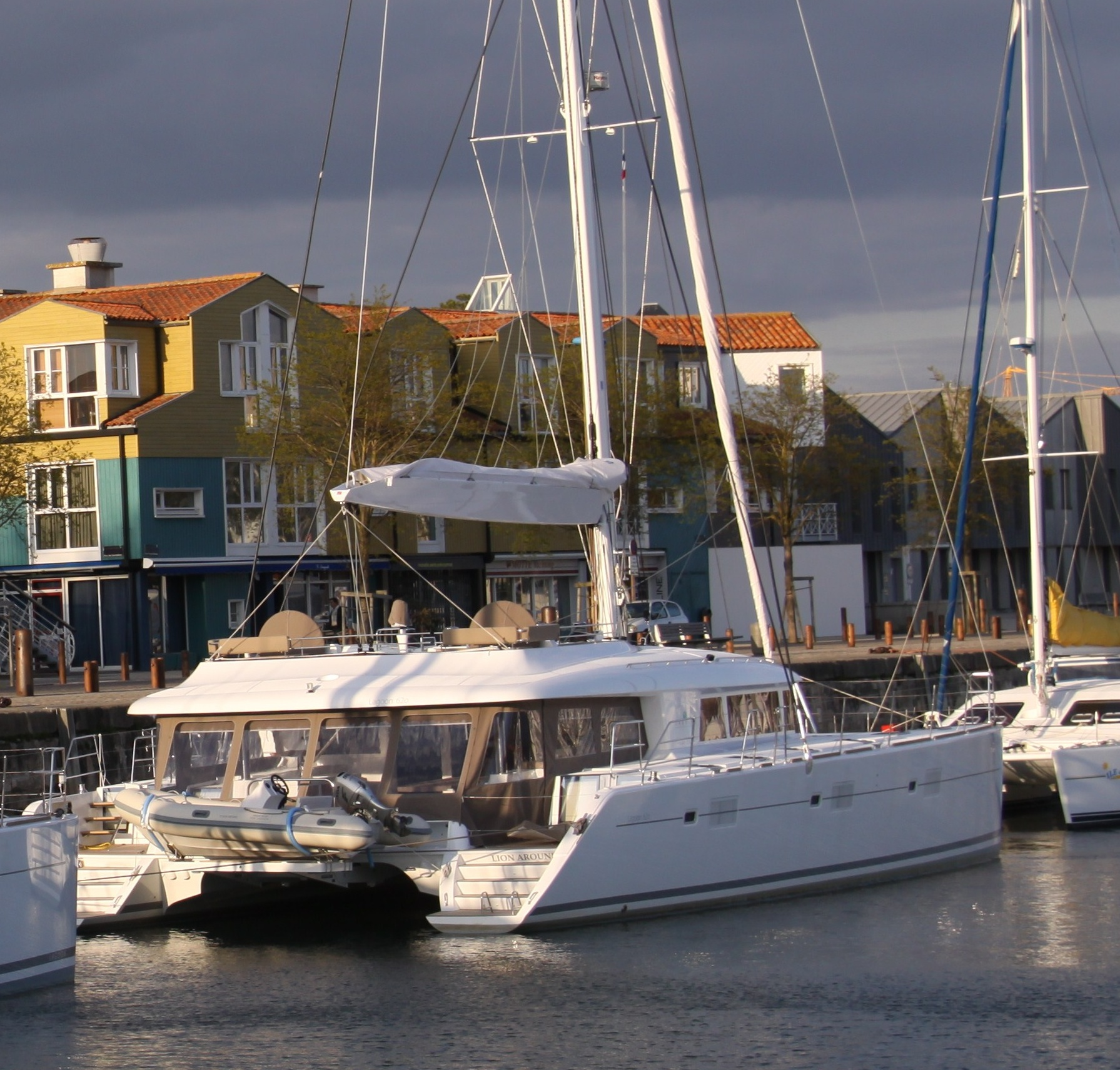
Lagoon 620

The Lagoon 620 is a recreational catamaran, built predominantly of vacuum infused polyester fiberglass sandwich, with wood trim. It has a fractional sloop rig, with a deck-stepped mast, two sets of swept spreaders and aluminum spars with 1X19 stainless steel wire rigging. The hulls have slightly raked stems, reverse transoms with swimming platforms, dual internally mounted spade-type rudders controlled by dual wheels located on the flying bridge, and twin fixed fin keels. It displaces 71,076 lb (32,240 kg).

The boat has a draft of 5.09 ft (1.55 m) with the standard twin keels.

The boat is fitted with twin 110 hp (82 kW) diesel engines for docking and maneuvering. The fuel tank holds 343 U.S. gallons (1,300 L; 286 imp gal) and the fresh water tank has a capacity of 253 U.S. gallons (960 L; 211 imp gal).

The design has sleeping accommodation for eight to 14 people, with a number of different four- to six-cabin interior layouts in the port and starboard hulls. In all layouts each cabin has a private head with a shower. The main salon has an L-shaped settee and a forward-facing navigation station. The galley is of straight configuration and is equipped with a four-burner stove, a refrigerator, freezer and a double sink. Cabin maximum headroom is 81 in (206 cm). There is also an aft cockpit lounge and seating on the flying bridge.

For sailing downwind the design may be equipped with a symmetrical spinnaker of 3,229 sq ft (300.0 m^{2}), an asymmetrical gennaker of 2,045 sq ft (190.0 m^{2}) or a code 0 sail of 1,991 sq ft (185.0 m^{2}).

The design has a hull speed of 10.35 kn (19.17 km/h).

== Operational history ==
In a 2015 review for boats.com, Zuzana Prochazka wrote, "at over 70,000 pounds this is not a light cat, despite the infusion molded construction. And the hulls are broad all the way forward, so pointing to weather will be challenging. But off the wind with a gennaker, this boat should produce 10 to 12 knots of speed in 25 knots of wind."

== See also ==
- List of multihulls
- List of sailing boat types
