= Sun Fast 20 =

1985 French recreational keelboat

Development
- Designer: Jacek Centkowski
- Location: France
- Year: 1985
- No. built: 500
- Builder: Jeanneau
- Role: Cruiser-Racer
- Name: Sun Fast 20

Boat
- Displacement: 1,720 lb (780 kg)
- Draft: 4.26 ft (1.30 m) with keel down

Hull
- Type: monohull
- Construction: fiberglass
- LOA: 21.00 ft (6.40 m)
- LWL: 18.86 ft (5.75 m)
- Beam: 7.87 ft (2.40 m)
- Engine: outboard motor

Hull appendages
- Keel: lifting keel
- Ballast: 595 lb (270 kg)
- Rudder: transom-mounted rudder

Rig
- Rig type: Bermuda rig
- I foretriangle height: 20.33 ft (6.20 m)
- J foretriangle base: 7.83 ft (2.39 m)
- P mainsail luff: 25.08 ft (7.64 m)
- E mainsail foot: 9.16 ft (2.79 m)

Sails
- Sailplan: fractional rigged sloop
- Mainsail area: 129 sq ft (12.0 m^{2})
- Jib/genoa area: 75 sq ft (7.0 m^{2})
- Gennaker area: 304 sq ft (28.2 m^{2})
- Upwind sail area: 205 sq ft (19.0 m^{2})
- Downwind sail area: 433 sq ft (40.2 m^{2})

The Sun Fast 20 is a recreational keelboat built by Jeanneau in France starting in 1985, and in Poland starting in 1993 with 500 boats completed. It is part of the Sun Fast sailboat range.

Built predominantly of polyester fiberglass, the deck has a balsa core. The hull has a slightly raked stem, a walk-through reverse transom, a transom-hung rudder controlled by a tiller and a retractable lifting keel. It displaces 1,720 lb (780 kg) and carries 595 lb (270 kg) of cast iron ballast. It has a draft of 4.26 ft (1.30 m) with the keel extended and 0.82 ft (0.25 m) with it retracted. It has a hull speed of 5.82 kn (10.78 km/h).

It has four berths with a V-berth and two settee berths in the cabin. The head is a portable type.

It has a 7/8 fractional sloop rig, with a deck-stepped mast, a single set of swept spreaders and aluminum spars with continuous stainless steel wire rigging. For sailing downwind the design may be equipped with an asymmetrical spinnaker of 304 sq ft (28.2 m^{2}), flown from a retractable bowsprit.
