= Sun Fast 17 =

1990s French recreational keelboat

Development
- Designer: Jacek Centkowski
- Location: France
- Year: 1994
- No. built: ~300
- Builder: Jeanneau
- Role: Cruiser
- Name: Sun Fast 17

Boat
- Displacement: 1,323 lb (600 kg)
- Draft: 3.28 ft (1.00 m)

Hull
- Type: monohull
- Construction: fiberglass
- LOA: 16.57 ft (5.05 m)
- LWL: 15.09 ft (4.60 m)
- Beam: 7.55 ft (2.30 m)
- Engine: outboard motor

Hull appendages
- Keel: centerboard
- Ballast: 276 lb (125 kg)
- Rudder: transom-mounted rudder

Rig
- Rig type: Bermuda rig
- I foretriangle height: 16.58 ft (5.05 m)
- J foretriangle base: 5.41 ft (1.65 m)
- P mainsail luff: 19.19 ft (5.85 m)
- E mainsail foot: 7.87 ft (2.40 m)

Sails
- Sailplan: fractional rigged sloop
- Mainsail area: 97 sq ft (9.0 m^{2})
- Jib/genoa area: 48 sq ft (4.5 m^{2})
- Gennaker area: 161 sq ft (15.0 m^{2})
- Upwind sail area: 145 sq ft (13.5 m^{2})
- Downwind sail area: 258 sq ft (24.0 m^{2})

The Sun Fast 17 is a French sailboat that was designed by Jacek Centkowski as a cruiser and first built in 1994.

The boat is part of the Sun Fast sailboat range and was developed into the Balt 17.

== Production ==
The design was built by Jeanneau in France, from 1994 to 1999, with about 300 boats completed, but it is now out of production.

== Design ==
The Sun Fast 17 is a recreational keelboat, built predominantly of fiberglass, with wood trim. It has a 3/4 fractional sloop rig, with a keel-stepped mast, a single set of swept spreaders and aluminum spars with continuous stainless steel wire rigging. The hull has a slightly raked stem, a walk-through reverse transom, a transom-hung rudder controlled by a tiller and a retractable centerboard. It displaces 1,323 lb (600 kg) and carries 276 lb (125 kg) of cast iron ballast.

The boat has a draft of 3.28 ft (1.00 m) with the centerboard extended and 0.82 ft (0.25 m) with it retracted, allowing operation in shallow water, beaching or ground transportation on a trailer.

The boat is normally fitted with a small 4 hp (3 kW) outboard motor for docking and maneuvering.

The design has sleeping accommodation for four people, with a double "V"-berth in the bow cabin and two straight settees in the main cabin and an aft cabin with a double berth on the port side. Cabin headroom is 52 in (132 cm).

For sailing downwind the design may be equipped with a asymmetrical spinnaker of 161 sq ft (15.0 m^{2}) flown from a retractable bowsprit.

The design has a hull speed of 5.21 kn (9.65 km/h).
