= Lagoon 410 =

Sailboat class

Development
- Designer: Van Peteghem/Lauriot-Prevost
- Location: France
- Year: 1997
- No. built: 283
- Builders: Jeanneau; Construction Navale Bordeaux; Lagoon Catamaran
- Role: Cruiser
- Name: Lagoon 410

Boat
- Displacement: 15,961 lb (7,240 kg)
- Draft: 3.94 ft (1.20 m)

Hull
- Type: catamaran
- Construction: fiberglass
- LOA: 40.58 ft (12.37 m)
- LWL: 38.29 ft (11.67 m)
- Beam: 26.25 ft (8.00 m)
- Engine: Twin 54 hp (40 kW) diesel engines

Hull appendages
- Keel: twin keels
- Ballast: none
- Rudder: twin rudders

Rig
- Rig type: Bermuda rig

Sails
- Sailplan: fractional rigged sloop
- Mainsail area: 603 sq ft (56.0 m^{2})
- Jib/genoa area: 409 sq ft (38.0 m^{2})
- Spinnaker area: 1,163 sq ft (108.0 m^{2})
- Upwind sail area: 1,012 sq ft (94.0 m^{2})
- Downwind sail area: 1,765 sq ft (164.0 m^{2})

The Lagoon 410 is a French sailboat that was designed by Van Peteghem/Lauriot-Prevost as a cruiser and first built in 1997.

The boat replaced the 1994 Lagoon 42 in the company product line and the original 410 was replaced by an updated version, the Lagoon 410-S2.

== Production ==
The design was built by in France Jeanneau's Lagoon catamaran division, which was later sold to Construction Navale Bordeaux (CNB) and is now part of Beneteau. It was built from 1997 to 2006, with 283 boats completed, but it is now out of production.

== Design ==
The Lagoon 410 is a recreational sailing catamaran, built predominantly of polyester fiberglass, with some sections from fiberglass sandwich. It has a fractional sloop rig, with a deck-stepped mast, one set of diamond swept spreaders and aluminum spars with continuous stainless steel wire rigging. The hulls have slightly raked stems, reverse transoms with steps, twin internally mounted spade-type rudders controlled by a wheel and twin fixed keels. It displaces 15,961 lb (7,240 kg).

The boat has a draft of 3.94 ft (1.20 m) with the standard keels.

The boat is fitted with twin diesel engines of 27 hp (20 kW) each, for docking and maneuvering. The fuel tank holds 53 U.S. gallons (200 L; 44 imp gal) and the fresh water tank has a capacity of 12 U.S. gallons (45 L; 10.0 imp gal).

The boat was produced with several different interior arrangements for private owners, or yacht charter use. Typically it has sleeping accommodation for eight people, with a double berth in the bow and stern of each hull. The central salon has an L-shaped settee and a straight settee. The galley is located on the starboard side of the salon. The galley is equipped with a two-burner stove, an ice box and a double sink. A navigation station is opposite the galley, on the port side. The boat may be equipped with two to four heads, each located in the hulls. Cabin maximum headroom is 69 in (175 cm).

For sailing downwind the design may be equipped with a symmetrical spinnaker of 1,163 sq ft (108.0 m^{2}).

The design has a hull speed of 8.29 kn (15.35 km/h).

The 410-S2 version introduced some improvements to the basic design, including larger cabin portlights, a redesigned galley, halyards re-routed to the cockpit, provision of electric winches for the main halyard and mainsheet and relocation of the anchor to the bow.

== Operational history ==
A catamaranreviews.com review concluded, "the Lagoon 410 catamaran is a good, low-budget choice for a family to go offshore sailing. It is comfortably equipped, has enough storage space and follows an easy layout. Some minor adjustments can further help customize the boat to fully meet the owner’s expectations."

A review on katamarans.com stated, "the 410 is pleasant to sail, with good handling in a seaway and moderate pitching. On port tack, close hauled on a windy day, you will need your wet weather gear, but on most points of sail you are well protected. She is an easy boat to sail short handed, despite the fact that she doesn’t have a self tacking jib"

In a 2018 review Daniella Wender wrote, "if you are looking for a vessel that's stable, well equipped and comfortable for a sailing expedition, the Lagoon 410 catamaran is the ideal choice. Whether the sea is calm or somewhat rough, this toy will always give the experience you are looking for. It is simply one of the best catamaran yachts to take for a weeklong sailing expedition."

== See also ==
- List of multihulls
- List of sailing boat types
