= Lagoon 440 =

Sailboat class

Development
- Designer: Van Peteghem/Lauriot-Prevost
- Location: France
- Year: 2004
- No. built: 423
- Builder: Lagoon Catamaran
- Role: Cruiser
- Name: Lagoon 440

Boat
- Displacement: 26,786 lb (12,150 kg)
- Draft: 4.27 ft (1.30 m)

Hull
- Type: catamaran
- Construction: fiberglass
- LOA: 44.65 ft (13.61 m)
- LWL: 41.83 ft (12.75 m)
- Beam: 25.26 ft (7.70 m)
- Engine: Two Volvo Penta 40 hp (30 kW) diesel engines

Hull appendages
- Keel: twin keels
- Rudder: Twin internally-mounted spade-type rudders

Rig
- Rig type: Bermuda rig

Sails
- Sailplan: 7/8 fractional rigged sloop
- Total sail area: 860.00 sq ft (79.897 m^{2})

The Lagoon 440 is a French sailboat that was designed by Van Peteghem/Lauriot-Prevost as a cruiser and yacht charter boat. It was first built in 2004.

== Production ==
The design was built by Lagoon catamaran in France, from 2004 to 2010 with 423 boats completed, but it is now out of production.

The boat was replaced in production by the Lagoon 450.

== Design ==
The Lagoon 440 is a recreational catamaran, built predominantly of polyester fiberglass, with wood trim. The fiberglass is all vacuum-bagged infused resin. The hull is solid fiberglass below the waterline and closed-cell foam-cored above it, while the deck is balsa-cored.

The design has a 7/8 fractional sloop rig, with a fully-battened mainsail, a roller furling genoa, a deck-stepped mast, one set of swept spreaders and anodized Sparcraft aluminum spars with stainless steel wire rigging. The hulls have slightly raked stems, reverse transoms with swimming platforms, dual internally mounted spade-type rudders controlled by a wheel mounted on a flying bridge and twin fixed fin keels. It has electric winches and can also be helmed via the autopilot from the main salon nav station. It displaces 26,786 lb (12,150 kg).

The boat has a draft of 4.27 ft (1.30 m) with the standard twin keels.

The boat is fitted with twin Swedish Volvo Penta diesel engines of 40 hp (30 kW) each, for docking and maneuvering. A hybrid electric/diesel propulsion system was a factory option, which included the ability to charge the batteries using the propellers regeneratively while sailing. The fuel tank holds 172 U.S. gallons (650 L; 143 imp gal) and the fresh water tank has a capacity of 238 U.S. gallons (900 L; 198 imp gal).

The design has sleeping accommodation for six or people, in "owners" and "charter" interior configurations. The owner's interior has two cabins, with a double berth in each, fore and aft in the port hull, each with their own private head. The starboard hull holds the owner's cabin, with an island berth aft and a head with a shower forward. The charter interior has two cabins in the starboard hull, identical to the port hull. The salon has a curved L-shaped settee and a forward-facing straight settee. The galley is located in the aft of the salon. The galley is L-shaped and is equipped with a three-burner stove, oven, a refrigerator and a triple sink. A navigation station is opposite the galley, and houses a freezer. The salon also has two tables with interchangeable legs.

With no helm fitted in the aft cockpit, it is a lounge and entertaining area. For sailing downwind the design may be equipped with an asymmetrical gennaker.

The design has a hull speed of 8.67 kn (16.06 km/h).

== Operational history ==
In a 2006 Sail Magazine review, Tom Dove wrote, "the Lagoon 440 is a well-made vessel with lovely, luxurious accommodations. I especially liked the space on the flybridge and the muted decor of the cabins. Tall sailors will welcome the substantial overhead clearances belowdecks. The panoramic view through the saloon windows is not only appealing, it’s practical in inclement weather as you can sail the boat via autopilot from the comfort of this living space."

A catamaranreviews.com review concluded, "the spacious layout of the Lagoon 440 catamaran provides for a good family voyage option while its unique flybridge equipped with winches gives a rather interesting skipper experience. Its four cabins and four heads along with the seating arrangements in the forward and aft cockpits also offer the exciting opportunity of entertaining guests and hosting a party – the galley, of course, is equipped well enough to provide for the food."

A 2009 review in Sailing Magazine, noted, "under sail the 440 is surprisingly quick. We didn't have much over 10 knots of breeze, but we saw 6s on the Raymarine GPS monitors while close reaching. The jib sheets lead well inboard on the cabintop, so she goes upwind well, although she seems sensitive to both the jib lead angle and the traveller, which spans the hardtop. The traveler can be used as a vang to tighten up the leach, or it can depower the sail with a "fisherman's reef" by letting the leach twist off. Nothing here to surprise an owner, and just the act of tinkering with trim (using those lovely electric winches) is fun."

== See also ==
- List of multihulls
- List of sailing boat types
