= Lagoon 35 =

Sailboat class

Lagoon 35CCC
Development
- Designer: Morrelli & Melvin
- Location: USA
- Year: 1995
- Builders: Jeanneau/Lagoon USA; TPI Composites [[Warren Rhode Island, USA ]] Lagoon Catamaran
- Role: Cruiser
- Name: Lagoon 35CCC

Boat
- Displacement: 9,500 lb (4,309 kg)
- Draft: 3.25 ft (0.99 m)

Hull
- General: 2
- Type: catamaran
- Construction: fiberglass
- LOA: 34.50 ft (10.52 m)
- LWL: 33.25 ft (10.13 m)
- Beam: 15.75 ft (4.80 m)
- Engine: Yanmar 1GM10 or 2GM20 diesel engine

Hull appendages
- Keel: fin keel
- Ballast: none
- Rudder: twin spade-type rudders

Rig
- Rig type: Bermuda rig

Sails
- Sailplan: fractional rigged sloop
- Total sail area: 620.00 sq ft (57.600 m^{2})

The Lagoon 35, also called the Lagoon 35CCC (Coastal Cruising Catamaran), commissioned by Lagoon. USA. was a catamaran sailboat that was designed by Americans Morrelli & Melvin as a cruiser and first built in 1995.

== Production ==
The design was built by Jeanneau's Lagoon catamaran division in France, which later became part of Construction Navale Bordeaux (CNB), now part of Groupe Beneteau. It was also built by TPI Composites in the US. Production started in 1995 with 11 built.

== Design ==
The Lagoon 35 is a recreational sailing catamaran, built predominantly of fiberglass. It has a fractional sloop rig, with a deck-stepped mast, one set of triangular spreaders and aluminum spars with stainless steel wire rigging. The twin hulls have plumb stems, reverse transoms with steps, twin internally mounted spade-type rudders and a twin fixed fin keels. It displaces 9,500 lb (4,309 kg) empty and carries no ballast.

The boat has a draft of 3.25 ft (0.99 m) with the standard keels.

The boat is fitted with a Japanese Yanmar 1GM10 diesel engine for docking and maneuvering. The fuel tank holds 36 U.S. gallons (140 L; 30 imp gal) and the fresh water tank has a capacity of 120 U.S. gallons (450 L; 100 imp gal).

The design has sleeping accommodation for four people, with two cabins, each with a double berth aft. The galley is located on the port side amidships. The galley is L-shaped and is equipped with a two-burner stove, an ice box and a double sink. An L-shaped settee and table are opposite the galley, on the starboard side of the salon. The head is located in the starboard hull.

The design has a hull speed of 7.93 kn (14.69 km/h) .

== See also ==
- List of multihulls
- List of sailing boat types
