= Advance provisioning allowance =

Advance provisioning allowance (APA) is an advance payment required to be made to fund estimated boarding costs of the charter price used to cover the costs of yacht preparation, requested supplies, port, mooring and other legal charges and fees, diesel and fuel, communications, crew gratuities, extras and depends on guest particular request for services, itinerary, food, beverages, etc.

The APA is administered by the yacht's captain, who is responsible for managing expenditures and maintaining records of costs incurred during the charter. Charterers may review these accounts for transparency.

Any unused portion of the APA at the conclusion of the yacht charter is refunded to the charterer. If actual expenses exceed the prepaid amount, the charterer may be required to pay the additional balance.

The APA is typically calculated as a percentage of the base charter fee, and the exact amount depends on factors such as the yacht type, itinerary, and guest preferences. Sailing yachts generally require a lower APA (around 20–25%) due to reduced fuel consumption, while motor yachts commonly require a higher APA (around 30–35%), sometimes reaching 40% or more depending on operating demands.
