= Lagoon 37 =

Sailboat class

Development
- Designer: Van Peteghem/Lauriot-Prevost
- Location: France
- Year: 1991
- No. built: 41
- Builders: Jeanneau; TPI Composites; Construction Navale Bordeaux; Lagoon Catamaran
- Role: Cruisers
- Name: Lagoon 37

Boat
- Displacement: 11,833 lb (5,367 kg)
- Draft: 4.00 ft (1.22 m)

Hull
- Type: catamaran
- Construction: fiberglass
- LOA: 36.75 ft (11.20 m)
- LWL: 33.33 ft (10.16 m)
- Beam: 20.00 ft (6.10 m)
- Engine: dual Perkins Engines or Yanmar diesel engines

Hull appendages
- Keel: fin keel
- Rudder: twin spade-type rudders

Rig
- Rig type: Bermuda rig

Sails
- Sailplan: fractional rigged sloop
- Total sail area: 839.00 sq ft (77.946 m^{2})

The Lagoon 37 is a French catamaran sailboat that was designed by Van Peteghem/Lauriot-Prevost as a cruiser and first built in 1991.

== Production ==
The design was initially built by Jeanneau in France, through a new division, Lagoon catamaran, which later became part of Construction Navale Bordeaux (CNB) and then the Beneteau Group. In the United States it was produced by TPI Composites. A total of 41 boats were built between 1991 and 1998, but it is now out of production.

== Design ==
The Lagoon 37 is a recreational catamaran, built predominantly of balsa-cored bi and triaxial cloth fiberglass, with isophthalic resin. It has a 7/8 fractional sloop rig. The hulls have raked stems, reverse transoms with steps to swimming platforms, twin internally mounted spade-type rudders controlled by a wheel and fixed fin keels. It displaces 11,833 lb (5,367 kg) and carries no ballast.

The boat has a draft of 4.00 ft (1.22 m) with the standard keels.

The boat is fitted with twin British Perkins Engines or Japanese Yanmar diesel engines, for docking and maneuvering. The fuel tank holds 52 U.S. gallons (200 L; 43 imp gal) and the fresh water tank has a capacity of 100 U.S. gallons (380 L; 83 imp gal).

The design has sleeping accommodation for six people, with two central cabins and a cabin in the port pontoon, each with a double berth. There is a central salon with an eight-seat U-shaped settee. The galley is located in the port pontoon, amidships. The galley has an island configuration and is equipped with a three-burner stove, an ice box and double sinks. The head is located aft in the starboard pontoon and includes a shower.

For sailing downwind the design may be equipped with a symmetrical spinnaker.

The design has a hull speed of 7.74 kn (14.33 km/h).

== Operational history ==
In a review Chris Caswell stated, "probably the biggest surprise to monohull sailors is that the Lagoon 37 doesn't give up any windward ability. With a pair of NACA-shaped fin keels, our 37 sailed just as high as several modern monohulls, made a steady nine knots in the 18-knot apparent wind, and tacked through 90 degrees. Off the wind, of course, the cat was quick and the speedometer showed bursts as high as 15 knots without any effort."

In a Sailing Magazine review, naval architect Robert Perry wrote, "the Lagoon 37 appears to be a clean and refined cat with careful attention paid to styling. You certainly cannot base this appreciation on the profile of the cat alone. In profile, without any indication of the tremendous beam, almost any cat will look very high and top-heavy. But if you can view the Lagoon from about 30 degrees off the bow, the height of the house is diminished and you have a handsome, if somewhat spacey-looking, boat."

== See also ==
- List of multihulls
- List of sailing boat types
