= Lagoon catamaran =

Range of French twin-hulled boats

- Industry: Boat building
- Founded: 1984; 42 years ago
- Headquarters: Bordeaux, France
- Products: Catamarans
- Parent: Groupe Beneteau
- Website: cata-lagoon.com/en

Lagoon catamaran is a brand of twin-hulled boats that are designed and produced in Bordeaux, France.

The company began in 1984 as a specialist multihull division of Jeanneau, a volume monohull constructor. Jeanneau sold the division to Construction Navale Bordeaux (CNB), which was purchased by Beneteau in 1995, another French boat manufacturer.

Lagoon is the world's largest multihull builder with 5800 catamarans produced since 1984. The company specialises in modern sailing catamarans that are suitable for both coastal and offshore sailing. Most models are available in a charter version and an owner's version. The designers, Marc Van Peteghem and Vincent Lauriot-Prévost at VPLP design, claim to be very responsive to customer feedback, thus enabling the designs to evolve over time.

Lagoon catamarans have been well-received, and the Lagoon 380 has been their most successful model. Lagoon have also produced some power catamarans, including the Lagoon Power 43 and Lagoon Power 44.

Lagoon boats smaller than 50 ft (15 m) are built at Belleville-sur-Vie and launched at Les Sables-d'Olonne in Vendée. Boats over 50 feet long are built at the CNB shipyard in Bordeaux.

By 2021 the company had produced 6,000 catamarans.

== Models ==
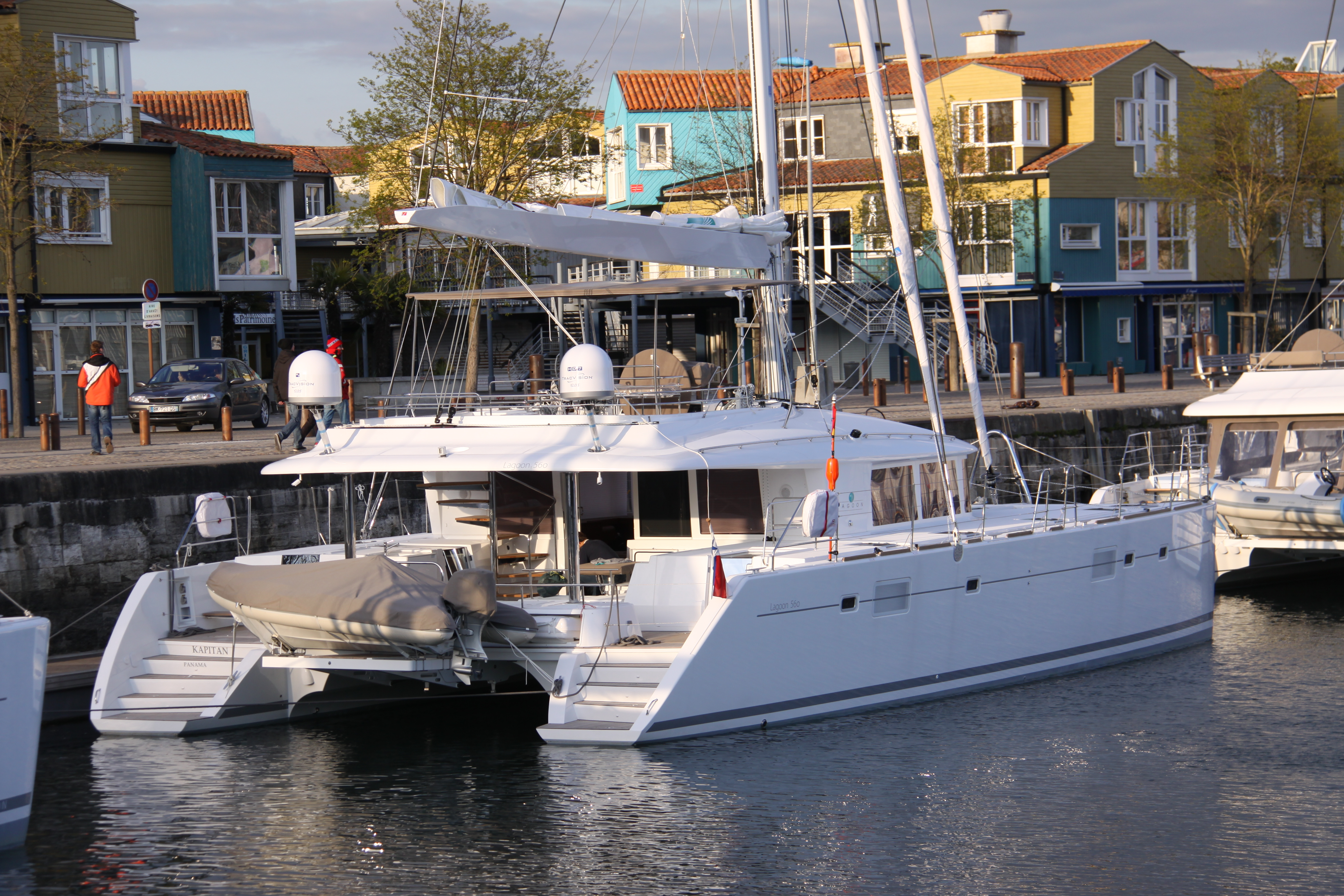
Lagoon 560

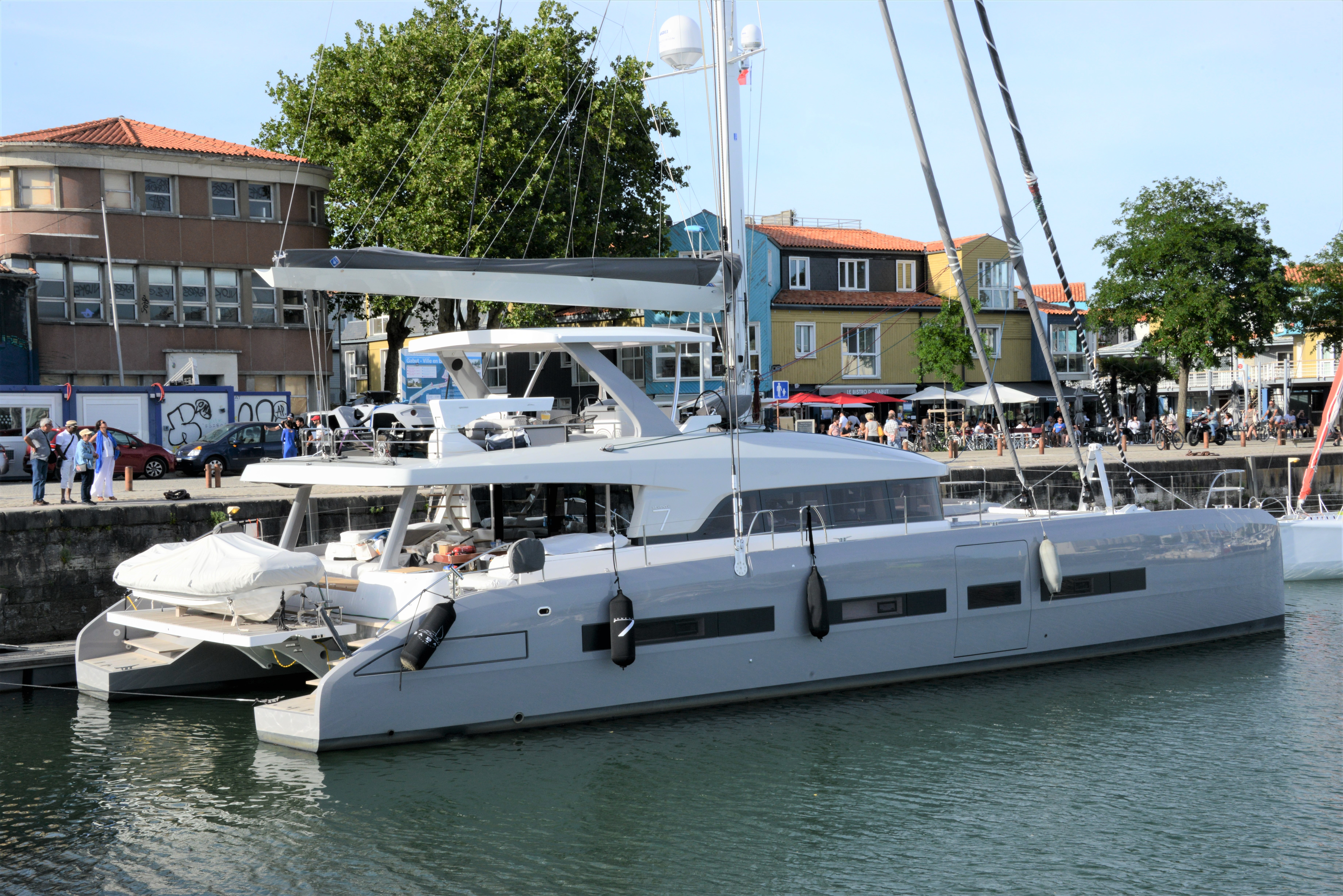
Lagoon 77

Lagoon catamaran models:

- Lagoon 55 (1987)
- Lagoon 42 (1990)
- Lagoon 47 (1992)
- Lagoon 37 (1991)
- Lagoon 35 (1995)
- Lagoon 410 (1997)
- Lagoon 470 (1998)
- Lagoon 380 (2000)
- Lagoon 570 (2000)
- Lagoon 440 (2004)
- Lagoon 500 (2005)
- Lagoon 420 (2006)
- Lagoon 421 (2006)
- Lagoon 400 (2009)
- Lagoon 620 (2009)
- Lagoon 52 (2011)
- Lagoon 560 (2011)
- Lagoon 39 (2013)
- Lagoon 450 (2014)
- Lagoon 42-2 (2016)
- Lagoon 40 (2017)
- Lagoon 77 (2017)
- Lagoon 50 (2018)
- Lagoon 46 (2019)
- Lagoon 65 (2019)
- Lagoon 55 (2021)
- Lagoon 51 (2022)

Since the Lagoon 39 and 52 in 2012, the mast of all Lagoon catamarans does not rest on the partition wall but is located further aft, in order to increase the size and ease-of-use of the self-tacking jib hence improving the mainsail/headsail arrangement and overall performance.

Lagoon boats are made of balsa wood core sandwiched between fiberglass layers which are vacuum infusion molded. Cabinetry is made of plywood.

== See also ==
- List of multihulls
- Boat building
- Polynesian multihull terminology
