= Lagoon 39 =

Sailboat class

Development
- Designer: Van Peteghem/Lauriot-Prevost; Nauta Design
- Location: France
- Year: 2013
- Builder: Lagoon Catamaran
- Role: Cruiser
- Name: Lagoon 39

Boat
- Displacement: 25,732 lb (11,672 kg)
- Draft: 4.17 ft (1.27 m)

Hull
- Type: catamaran
- Construction: fiberglass
- LOA: 38.40 ft (11.70 m)
- Beam: 22.28 ft (6.79 m)
- Engine: Twin diesel engines 20 or 29 hp (15 or 22 kW)

Hull appendages
- Keel: twin keels
- Rudder: twin spade-type rudders

Rig
- Rig type: Bermuda rig

Sails
- Sailplan: fractional rigged sloop
- Mainsail area: 474 sq ft (44.0 m^{2})
- Jib/genoa area: 344 sq ft (32.0 m^{2})
- Other sails: Code 0: 732 sq ft (68.0 m^{2})
- Upwind sail area: 818 sq ft (76.0 m^{2})
- Downwind sail area: 1,206 sq ft (112.0 m^{2})

The Lagoon 39 is a French sailboat that was designed by Van Peteghem/Lauriot-Prevost, with the interior by Nauta Design. It was designed as a cruiser and first built in 2013.

== Production ==
The design was built by Lagoon catamaran in France, from 2013 until 2017, but it is now out of production.

== Design ==
The Lagoon is a recreational catamaran, built predominantly of polyester fiberglass sandwich, with wood trim. The hulls are made from solid fiberglass below the waterline and have a vacuum-infused balsa core above the waterline. The deck is also balsa-cored. It has a fractional sloop rig, with a deck-stepped mast, two sets of swept diamond spreaders and aluminum spars with 1X19 stainless steel wire rigging. The hulls have plumb stems, reverse transoms with steps to swimming platforms, dual internally mounted spade-type rudders controlled by a wheel and twin fixed fin keels. It displaces 25,732 lb (11,672 kg).

The boat has a draft of 4.17 ft (1.27 m) with the standard keels.

The boat is fitted with twin diesel engine of 21 or 29 hp (16 or 22 kW) for docking and maneuvering. The fuel tank holds 106 U.S. gallons (400 L; 88 imp gal) and the fresh water tank has a capacity of 158 U.S. gallons (600 L; 132 imp gal).

The design has sleeping accommodation for four to eight people, in two, three or four cabin arrangements. The two cabin interior has double berths aft in each hull with a head in each bow and lunge in between. Additional cabins may be added in each hull bow and the heads moved amidships into the lounge area. The main salon has an L-shaped settee with the galley located on the port side. The galley is L-shaped and is equipped with a three-burner stove, an ice box and a double sink. A navigation station is opposite the galley, forward on the port side. Cabin maximum headroom is 79 in (201 cm).

For sailing downwind the design may be equipped with a code 0 sail of 732 sq ft (68.0 m^{2}).

== Operational history ==
In a 2013 Cruising World review, Herb McCormick wrote, "Down below, the innovative layout also received favorable marks. I've long admired cats that reserved the entire starboard hull for an owners suite with a dedicated stateroom that can be closed off for privacy from the central saloon via a sliding door and that includes a king-size double berth aft, a midship desk/vanity, and a large en suite head and separate shower stall forward. On the Lagoon 39, the builders took this very good, well-executed idea and doubled down on it: The port hull and stateroom is the mirror image of the starboard cabin. At face value, it doesn't seem revolutionary, but it speaks to the way many owners actually use their boats, and it's a smart, cool use of space. (And, of course, more traditional three- and four-cabin accommodation plans are also available.)"

In a 2014 review for Sail Magazine, Tom Dove wrote, "I gave the boat a good workout out on the open Atlantic off Miami in an 18-knot wind and short, steep 5-7 foot seas. The boat was fast. I noted 7 knots most of the time to windward, with a top speed of about 7.5 knots. Measuring the tacking angle accurately was impossible under the circumstances, but the boat never hesitated to come about or respond to its helm. I was pleasantly surprised to find there was no pounding as the sharp hulls sliced through the waves, although the boat was pretty active with a fair amount of pitching movement. All told, it was a good ride and quite dry, considering the conditions. My impression is that a similar-size monohull would have rolled more and been wetter, but would have pitched less. Which type of motion is better is a matter of personal preference. Nothing smaller than about 100 feet LOA would have ridden easily in the seas we experienced."

== See also ==
- List of multihulls
- List of sailing boat types
