= Lagoon 42 =

Sailboat class

Development
- Designer: Van Peteghem/Lauriot-Prevost
- Location: France
- Year: 1990
- No. built: 51
- Builders: Jeanneau; TPI Composites; Construction Navale Bordeaux; Lagoon Catamaran
- Role: Cruiser
- Name: Lagoon 42

Boat
- Displacement: 16,550 lb (7,507 kg)
- Draft: 4.42 ft (1.35 m)

Hull
- Type: catamaran
- Construction: fiberglass
- LOA: 42.50 ft (12.95 m)
- LWL: 38.75 ft (11.81 m)
- Beam: 22.67 ft (6.91 m)
- Engine: Two Perkins Engines or Yanmar 27 hp (20 kW) diesel engines

Hull appendages
- Keel: twin keels
- Rudder: Twin spade-type rudders

Rig
- Rig type: Bermuda rig
- I foretriangle height: 48.56 ft (14.80 m)
- J foretriangle base: 13.78 ft (4.20 m)
- P mainsail luff: 50.20 ft (15.30 m)
- E mainsail foot: 13.78 ft (4.20 m)

Sails
- Sailplan: fractional rigged sloop
- Total sail area: 1,119 sq ft (104.0 m^{2})

The Lagoon 42 is a French sailboat that was designed by Van Peteghem/Lauriot-Prevost as a cruiser and first built in 1990. It was also sold as the Moorings Lagoon 4200 for Moorings Yacht Charter use in the yacht charter trade.

A new design was introduced under the same model name of Lagoon 42 in 2016, but it is now usually referred to as the Lagoon 42-2 or Lagoon 42-2016 to differentiate it from the earlier 1990 design.

== Production ==
The design was built by Lagoon catamaran, a division of Jeanneau, in France. It was also built by TPI Composites in the United States. Lagoon catamaran later became part of Construction Navale Bordeaux (CNB) and Groupe Beneteau. The boat was produced from 1990 to 1994, with 51 boats built, but it is now out of production.

== Design ==
The Lagoon 42 is a recreational catamaran, built predominantly of polyester fiberglass with a balsa core, Kevlar, carbon fiber and marine plywood, with wood trim. It has a fractional sloop rig with a bowsprit, a deck-stepped mast, two sets of swept diamond spreaders and aluminum Hall or Sparcraft spars with stainless steel wire rigging. The hulls have raked stems, reverse transoms with swimming platforms, internally mounted spade-type rudders controlled by a wheel and twin fixed fin keels. It displaces 16,550 lb (7,507 kg).

The boat has a draft of 4.42 ft (1.35 m) with the standard twin keels.

The boat is fitted with either twin British Perkins Engines or Japanese Yanmar diesel engines of 27 hp (20 kW) each, for docking and maneuvering. The fuel tank holds 80 U.S. gallons (300 L; 67 imp gal) and the fresh water tank has a capacity of 160 U.S. gallons (610 L; 130 imp gal).

The design in "owner's" configuration has sleeping accommodation for six people, with a double berths fore and aft in the port hull and aft in the starboard hull. There are two heads, one amidships in the port hull and one in the starboard hull bow. The charter version adds an extra cabin in the starboard hull bow and moves the head to amidships. The main salon has a U-shaped settee, plus there is a U-shaped settee in the cockpit. The galley is located on the port side of the salon. The galley is L-shaped and is equipped with a stove, an ice box and a double sink. Cabin maximum headroom is 75 in (191 cm).

The design has a hull speed of 8.33 kn (15.43 km/h).

== See also ==
- List of multihulls
- List of sailing boat types
