= Saildrive =

Non-steerable propeller drive leg

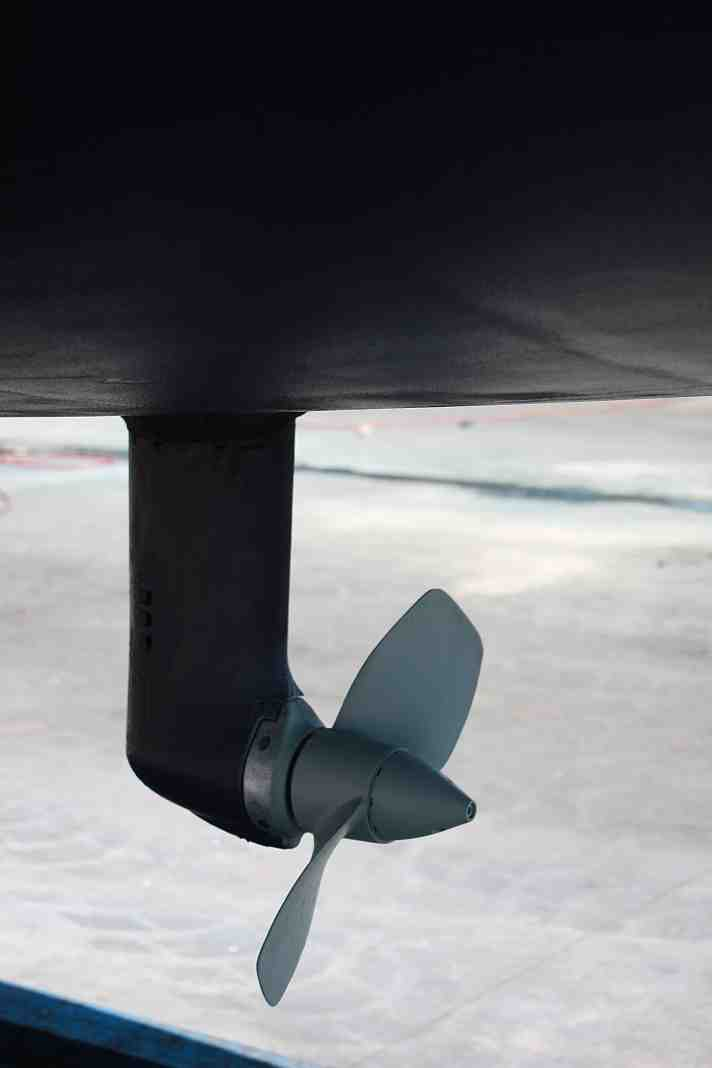
Saildrive of a Volvo Penta

A saildrive is a transmission system for a boat whose inboard engine has a horizontal output shaft. The saildrive's input shaft is therefore also horizontal. That input shaft is geared so as to drive a vertical intermediate shaft extending downward through the hull. The intermediate shaft is then geared so as to drive a horizontal propeller shaft mounted on a skeg outside the hull.

The transitions from horizontal to vertical and then back to horizontal can be seen as a Z shape, and saildrives are indeed similar to the Z-drive transmissions used on larger vessels. The difference between a saildrive and a Z-drive is that a saildrive's propeller shaft is fixed in place, pointing aft, whereas a Z-drive's propeller shaft can be rotated to any azimuth.

Traditional sailboat transmissions consist of a simple horizontal output shaft extended rearward from the engine, through the stern via a stuffing box. The saildrive has several advantages over the traditional sailboat transmission: smaller horizontal size, no stuffing box to maintain, and the propeller is mounted horizontally instead of at a downward angle.

Saildrive also reduces propeller walk, reduces vibration, and is more efficient.

== History of the saildrive ==
Among the earliest representatives of the technology was the OMC Zephyr Saildrive, produced from 1977 to 1984. This was a two-stroke gasoline engine to which oil needed to be added on a 50:1 mixture. It was a derated version of the 32 cubic inch engine block used at that time on the OMC Evinrude 25/30/35 hp outboards.

== See also ==
- Azimuth thruster – Steerable propulsion pod under a watercraft
