= Patrick Le Quément =

French car and catamaran designer

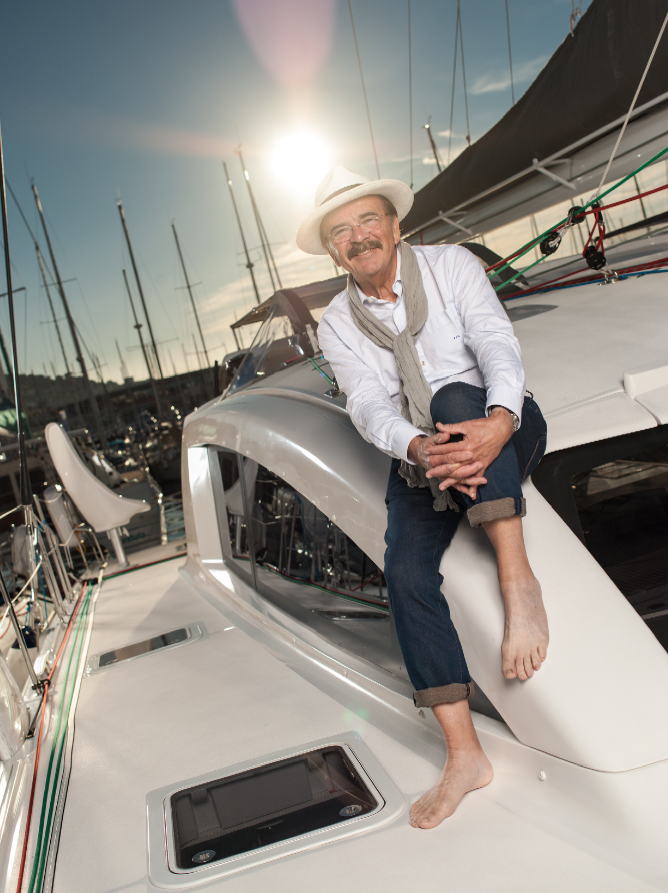
- Patrick Le Quément
- Born: Patrick Gilles Marie Le Quément; 4 February 1945 (age 81); Marseille, France
- Education: Birmingham Institute of Art and Design and Anglia Ruskin University
- Occupation: Automotive designer

I have never stopped drawing, as for me drawing is totally linked to thinking; I cannot think without drawing.

— Patrick Le Quément

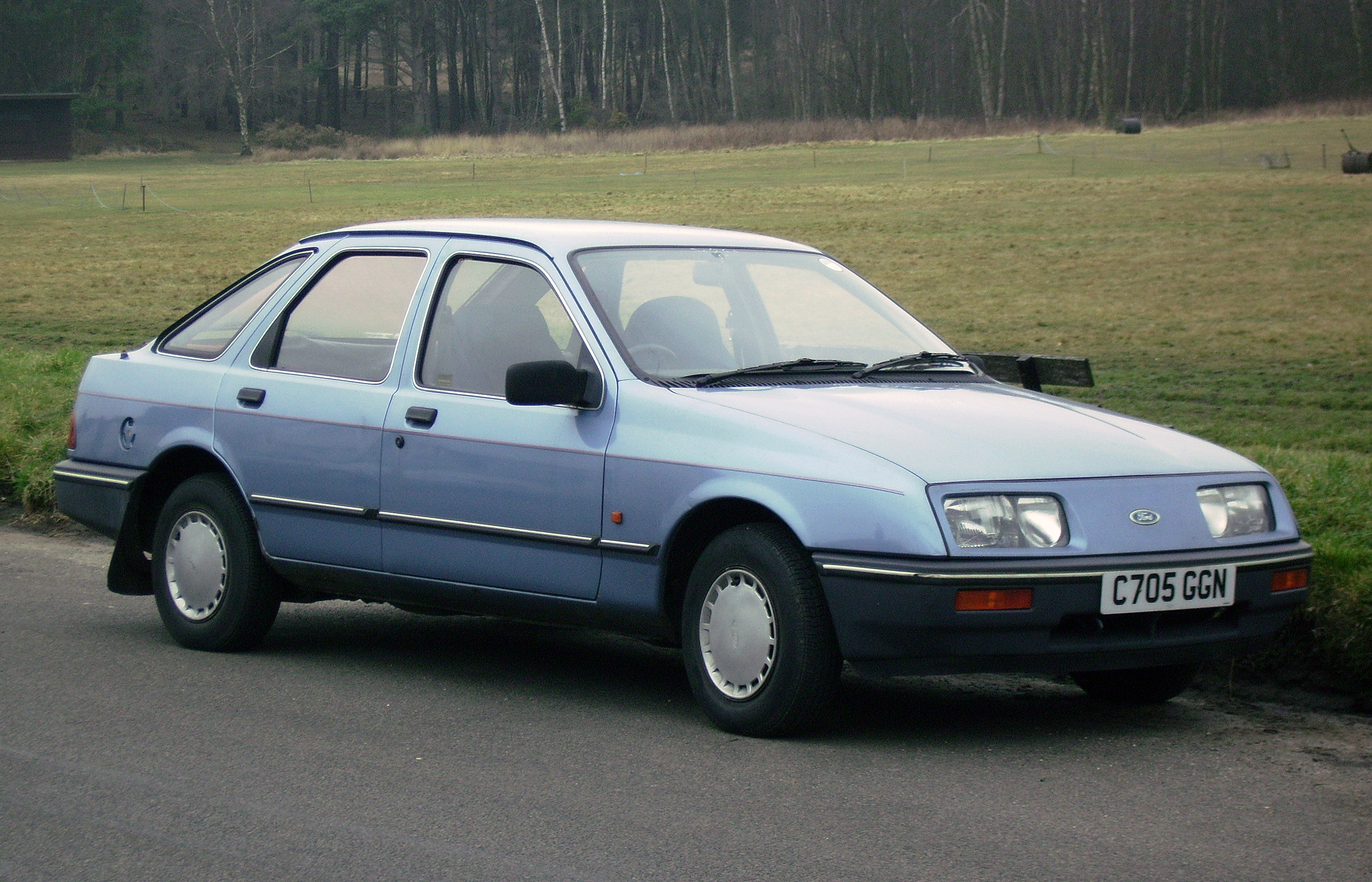
Ford Sierra.

Renault Twingo first generation; which sold over 2.6 million units

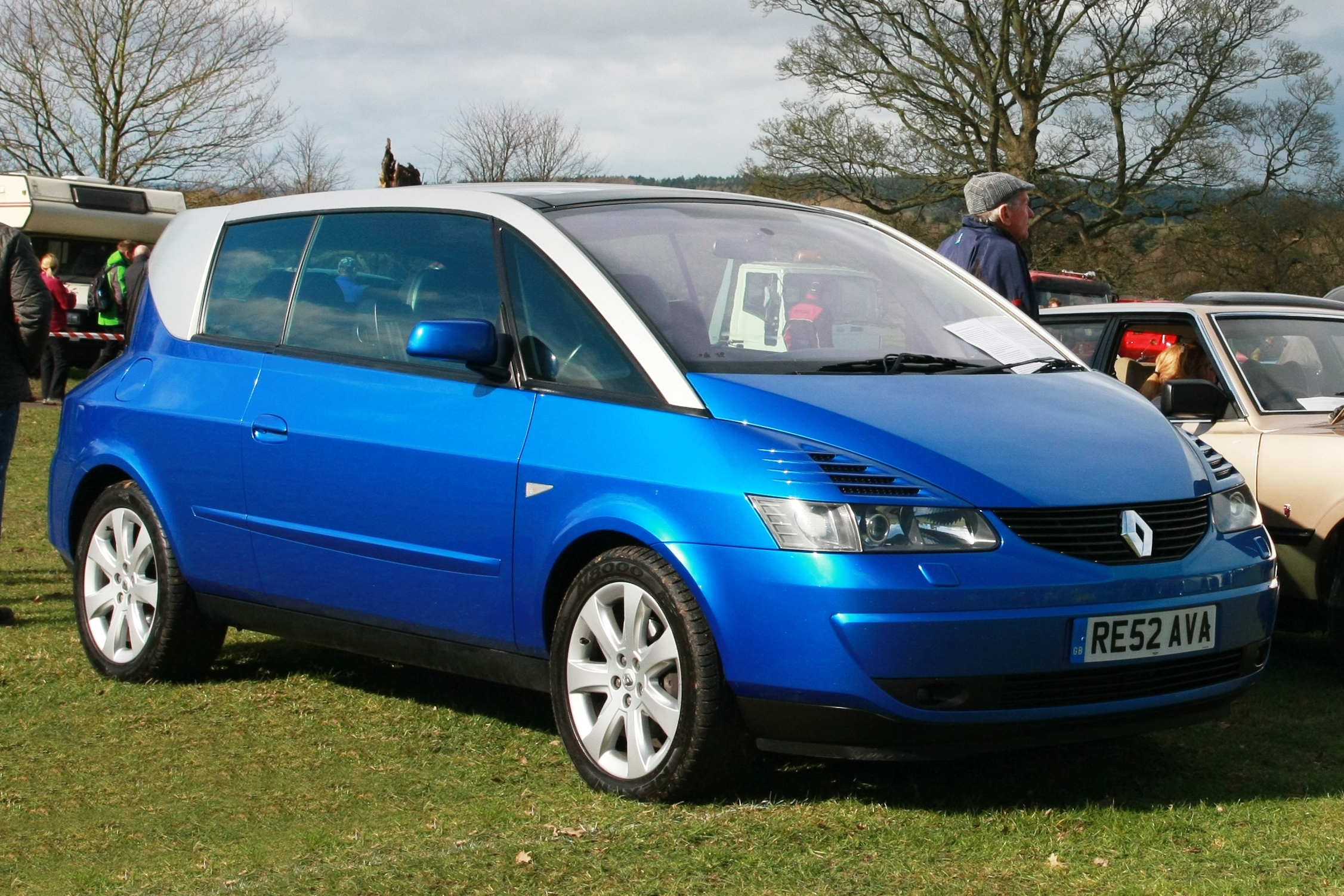
Renault Avantime

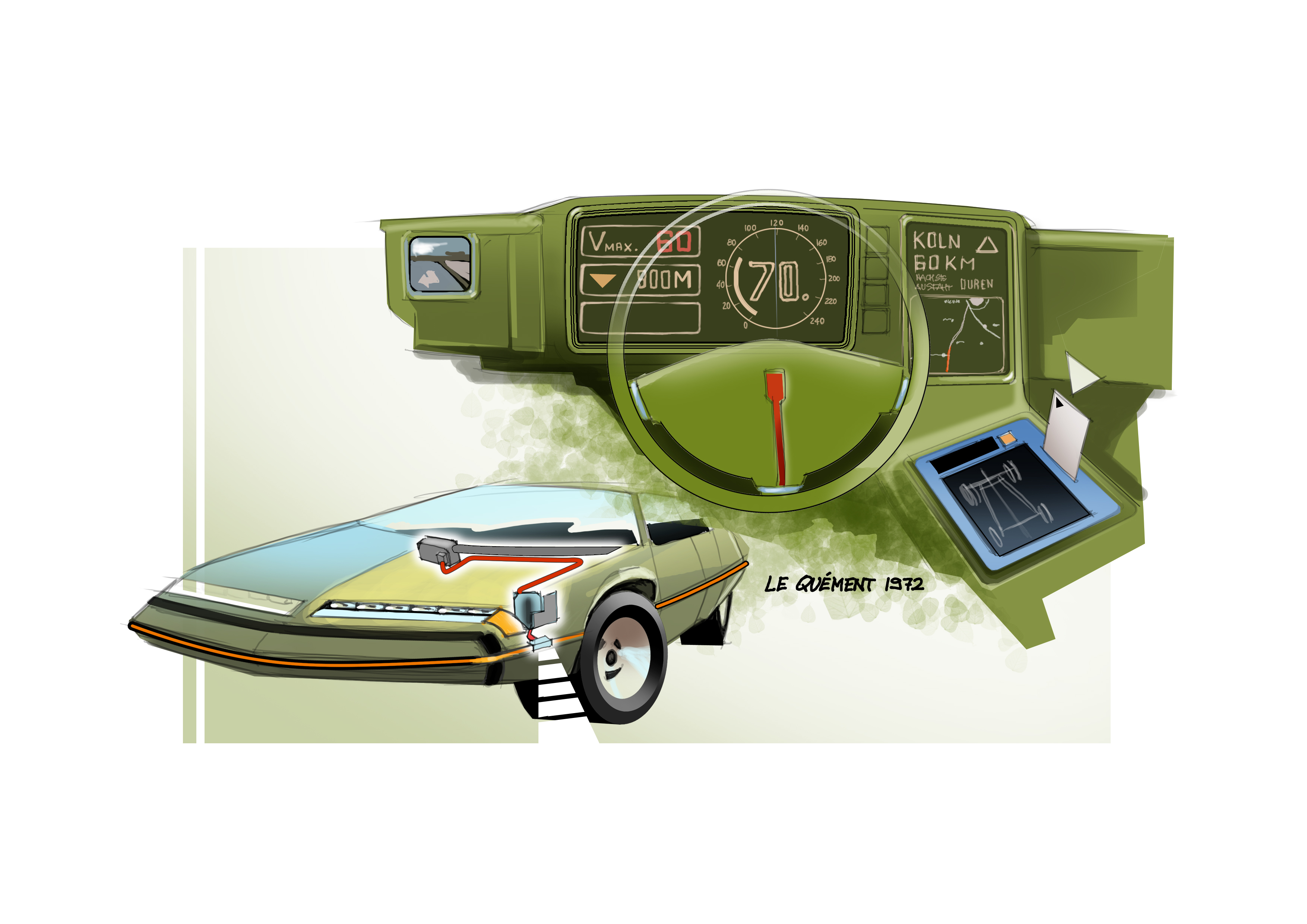
Published by Auto Motor Und Sport,1972, design rendering for an integrated navigation system

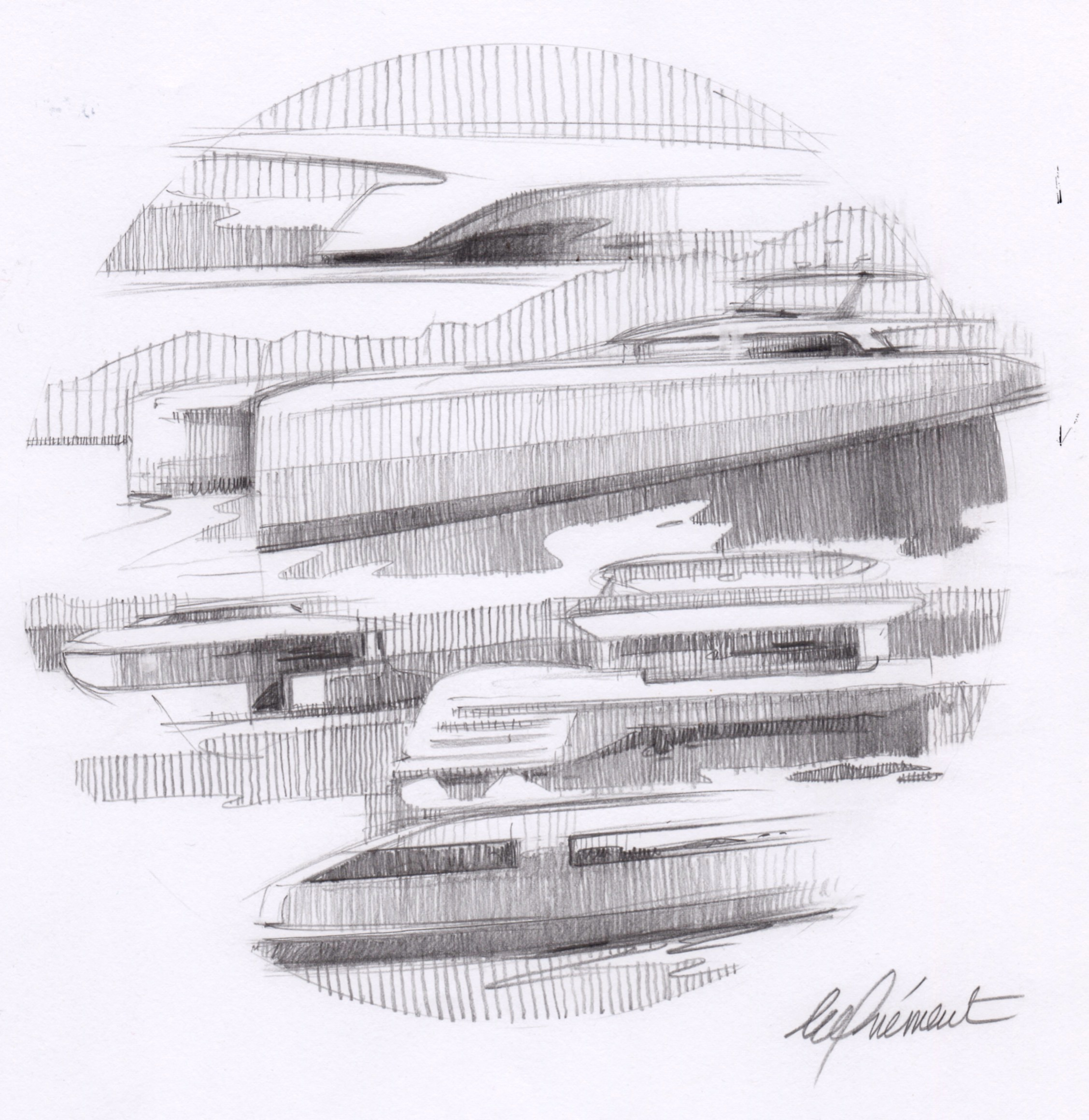
the 78' Lagoon Seventy 8 catamaran at the Salon de Cannes 2017.

Patrick Gilles Marie Le Quément (born 4 February 1945) is a French car and boat designer, known widely as a former designer with Ford and Volkswagen; as the former chief designer with Renault and for his yachting catamaran designs for Groupe Beneteau and Outremer.

Responsible for the design of vehicles reaching an estimated production over 60 million, Le Quément led the design of the Ford Sierra, Renault Espace, Avantime and first generation Twingo.

He authored the books Design Between the Lines (2019) and Lucky Man (2021); sits on the board of the Europa Academy for Automotive Excellence and has regularly contributed since 2023 to the automotive journalism site, Driven to Write, discussing design and stories from his career.

== Background ==
Le Quément was born in Marseille, France. His father, a Frenchman and Colonel in the French Foreign Legion, died when Le Quément was eleven. His mother, who was herself British, a nurse by profession, sent him to Britain where he grew up, attending a prep school in London and St Augustine’s College in Ramsgate.

From 1962 Le Quément attended Birmingham College of Arts and Crafts, one of the colleges that would become Birmingham City University (BCU), studying with Naum Slutzky, former professor at the Bauhaus in Germany, and playing rugby (for the architect's team as there was no corollary for art students) — graduating in 1966. He later received an MBA from Danbury Park Management Centre.

Le Quément met his future wife when they were eight. They married in 1969 and live with their three sons in Garches, western Paris and in Cassis, near Marseille.

== Early Career ==
Le Quément joined Simca of France in 1966 after graduation, but left and set up his own design business ‐ which failed.

After returning to England and joining Ford in 1968 as a designer. His signature designs included the Ford Cargo truck, and 1982's seminal Ford Sierra, the latter designed at Ford's engineering and research centre in Cologne-Merkenich, Germany. While with Ford, Le Quément tutored at the Royal College of Art for four years. Promised a promotion, he transferred to Detroit but left Ford because of the way the company treated Uwe Bahnsen after the introduction of the Sierra, — and returned to Europe in June 1985 when Carl Hahn, Chairman of the Volkswagen Group, invited him to join the Audi Group and set up a centre for Advance Design and Strategy. While working for VW in the early 1980s, he referred to Wolfsburg as Stylingrad.

== Renault career ==
In light of declining sales, Raymond Lévy (then Renault's chairman and CEO) recruited le Quément hoping French design could jump-start the company.

Before assuming the role as Renault's Vice President of Corporate Design in 1987, le Quément required structural changes in the role of design at Renault: his department would no longer answer to engineering; outside consultants were to be removed; the design team would double to more than 350; the department took a seat on the executive board; and personally, Le Quément would answer to no one but the chairman.

His team's designs for Renault included Twingo, Mégane and Mégane II – which he later admitted in an interview with Automotive News Europe magazine, was too bold; Scénic; the Espace models of 1994 and 1998; Kangoo; Laguna models of 1994; Avantime and the Vel Satis of 2002.

Le Quément said his structural changes were necessary to develop an independent and innovative formal language: "up to just a few years ago, I would have given you the name of individual products – but today I would be more inclined to say Renault Design. So basically we have abandoned what I call 'styling esperanto', namely the formal language used by most other manufacturers".

In 1987 Le Quément was appointed Senior Vice President of Quality and Corporate Design in 1995, when he also joined the Renault Management Committee. He was the head of Joint Design Policy Group formed by Renault-Nissan design body, since it was founded in 1999. Louis Schweitzer asked him to analyze the design organization of Nissan in 1999. Le Quément advised establishment of a head designer position, divorced from industrial tasks. Carlos Ghosn, in charge of Nissan, asked Le Quément to draw up a shortlist of designers for this position. Shiro Nakamura was Le Quément's favorite and became head designer at Nissan.

In April 2009, Le Quément announced his forthcoming retirement in October 2009, when he was succeeded at Renault by Laurens van den Acker.

== Later career ==
In 2012, Le Quément co-founded "The Sustainable Design School" with Maurille Larivière and Marc Van Peteghem, a school for sustainable design and innovation based in Nice.

Le Quément designed the Lagoon catamaran, for Groupe Beneteau and later designed yarchting catamarans for Outremer in conjunction with VPLP Design and Marc Van Peteghemhis.

== Awards ==
Le Quément won the French Grand Prix of Industrial Design (1992); Knight of the Ordre National of Merit (1993); Ordre National of the French Legion of Honour (1993); Honorary Doctorate Birmingham City University (1996); Lucky Strike Designer Award (2002) from the Raymond Loewy Foundation; Car & Driver Personality of the Decade (2004) and Eyes on Design Lifetime Design Achievement Award (2015). He was elected six times European Designer of the Year, and in 2022 as European Designer of the Year by his fellow designers.
