= Yacht charter =

Practice involved in renting a yacht

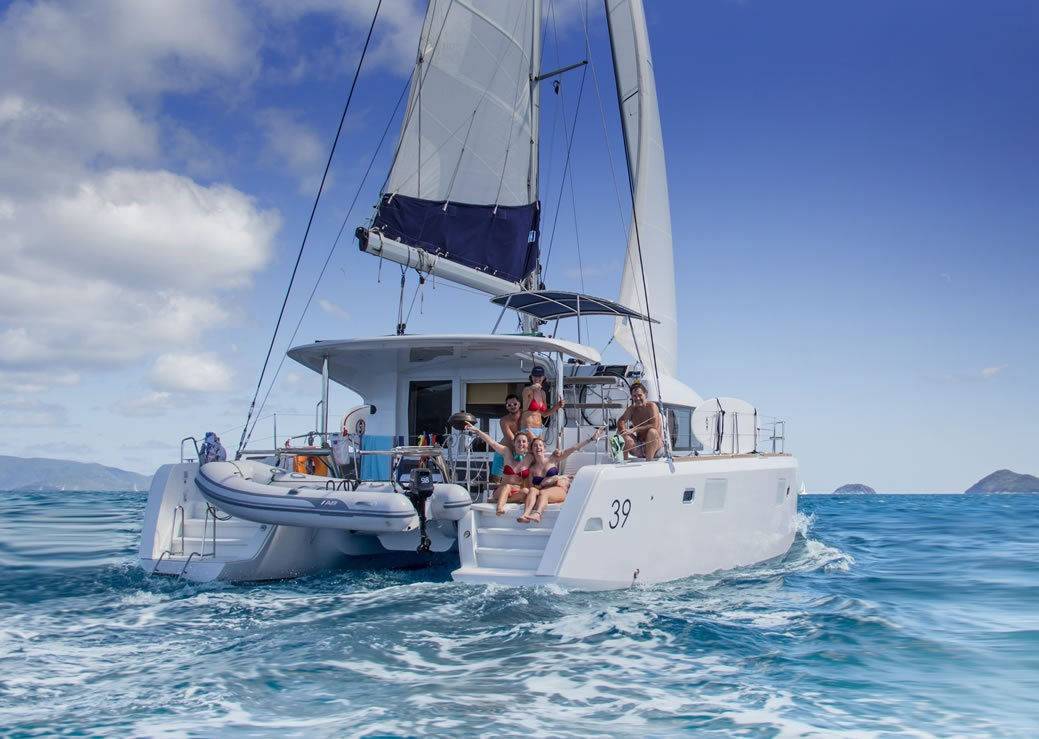
Yacht charters are yacht rentals where you live on a yacht for a certain period

Yacht chartering is the practice of renting, or chartering, a sailboat or motor yacht and traveling to various coastal or island destinations.

There are three main kinds of charter: bareboat, skippered and crewed. Bareboat charters require the client to skipper the boat themselves, while skippered charters include both boat and a professional skipper. Crewed charters are staffed by a captain and professional crew that can include chefs, engineers, deckhands, and stewards.

Most bareboat charter companies require clients to own a licence proving competence, such as the International Certificate of Competence or RYA Day Skipper.

Charter companies may also provide skippered charters, which include a skipper, but no additional crew.

== Types ==
Several factors determine the cost of a yacht charter, including the size of the yacht, its age, the builder, the number of crew, the season, and the cruising region. Charter rates also vary depending on whether it is peak season or off-peak, and certain destinations may be more expensive due to popularity or exclusivity.

The worldwide range of charter prices (per person per week) is estimated to be from around US$1,000 to over US$30,000, depending on the level of luxury and services provided.

For large yachts and superyachts over approximately 150 feet (46 m) in length, weekly base charter rates typically range from about US$80,000 to more than US$1,000,000, depending on size, amenities, and season.

Advertised weekly charter rates for yachts typically represent only a portion of the overall expenditure. In most cases, the listed price accounts for approximately 60% to 80% of the total cost. Additional charges commonly include the Advance Provisioning Allowance (APA), applicable taxes and value-added tax (VAT), crew gratuities, and any delivery or relocation fees required to position the vessel.

== Crewed charter ==
Crewed charter means that the yacht is rented with a full crew. Usually, the crew is based on a specific yacht. A captain, a chef, a deck's hand and a hostess are a typical crew.

Most crewed yacht charters take place on motor yachts, while catamarans have gained significant popularity in the last decade due to their large capacity and fuel efficiency.

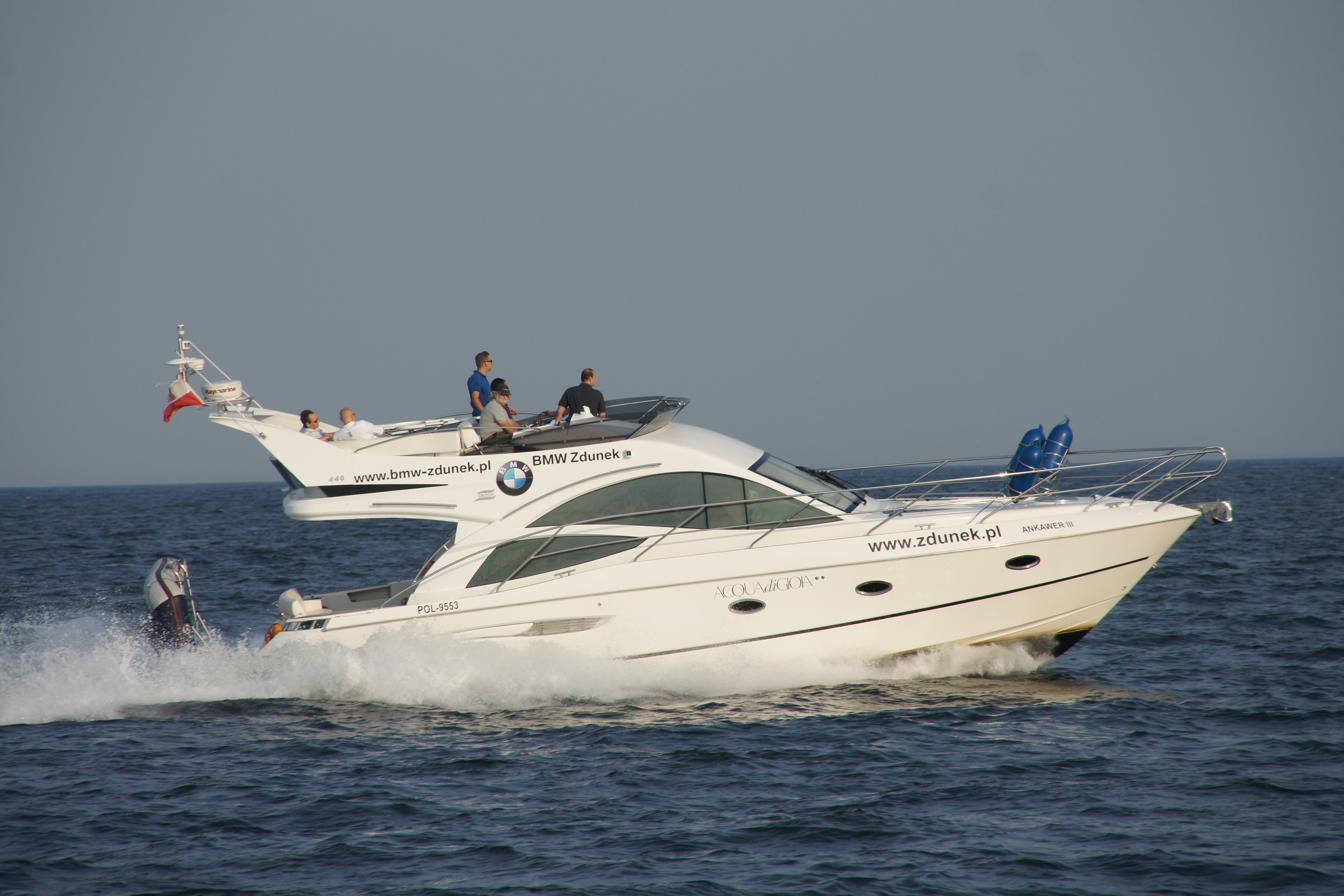
Motor yacht at Gdańsk Bay in Poland

In the eastern Mediterranean, particularly along the Turkish and Greek coasts, traditional wooden motor-sailing yachts known as gulets are a common choice for crewed charters. Originally built in coastal Turkish towns such as Bodrum and Marmaris, gulets typically accommodate 6 to 16 guests and are widely used for multi-day cruises along the Aegean and Mediterranean shores, a regional practice often referred to as a Blue Cruise.

== Skippered charter ==
Skippered charter means that the yacht is rented with a professional skipper/captain who is responsible for the manoeuvring of the yacht. In several cases, the skipper is also aided by other crew members. Skippered charter usually is used for yachts which require a skipper/captain with documented special nautical skills and experience. However, skippered charters exist on all types of yachts.

== Bareboat charter ==
A bareboat charter is a form of yacht hire in which the vessel is provided without crew. The charterer navigates and manages the boat, bearing legal and safety responsibility for the voyage. Bareboats commonly range from 32 ft up to about 55 ft; larger, more complex yachts typically require a professional crew.

Most charter companies require the charterer to hold a valid sailing licence before they allow them to book a bareboat charter. This is often a port authority rule, and the Croatian Ministry of the Sea publish a helpful list of accepted licences.

== See also ==
- Bareboat charter
- Luxury yachts
- List of motor yachts by length
- OCSC Sailing
