= Gennaker =

Type of sail developed before the 1980s

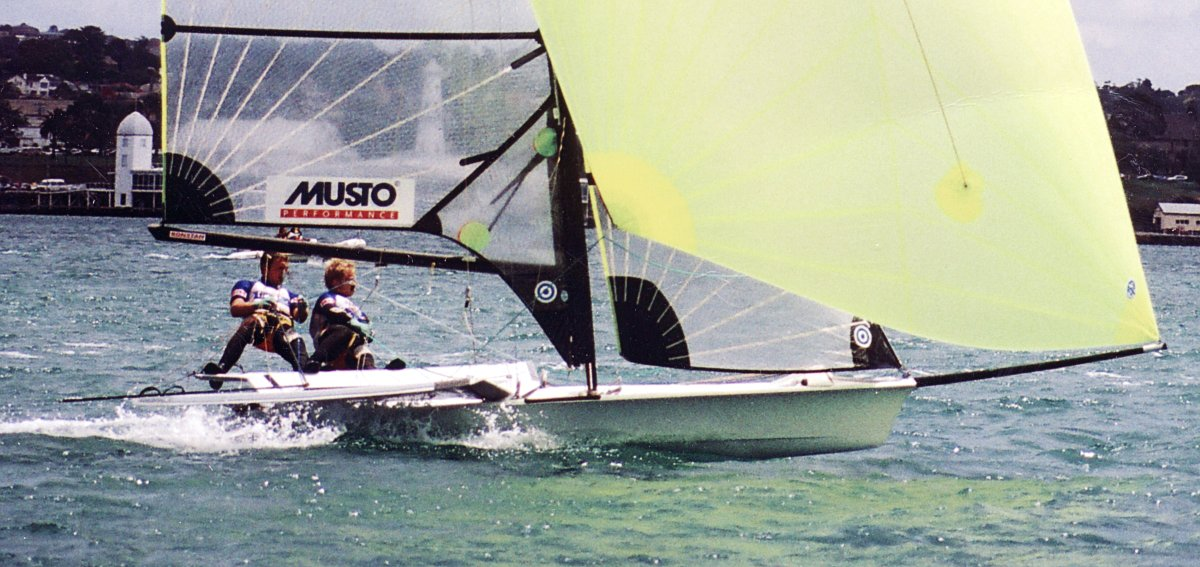
49er with a gennaker (yellow)

A gennaker is a sail that was developed before the 1980s. Used when sailing downwind, it is a cross between a genoa and a spinnaker. It is not symmetric like a true spinnaker but is asymmetric like a genoa, but the gennaker is not attached to the forestay like a jib or genoa. The gennaker is rigged like a spinnaker but the tack is fastened to the hull or to a bowsprit. It has greater camber than a genoa (but significantly less camber than a spinnaker). This is optimal for generating lift at larger angles of attack. An early form of gennaker was the "gollywhomper", used briefly in the 1870s.

The gennaker is a specialty sail primarily used on racing boats to bridge the performance gap between a genoa and a spinnaker. It is sometimes the only downwind sail on board because it is easier to use and less expensive than a spinnaker. Due to its geometry, the sail is less prone to collapsing than a spinnaker. A gennaker is optimal for a beam reach, while an asymmetrical spinnaker is optimal for a broad reach or run.
