= Third Turtle =

Boat

- Designer(s): Dick Newick

Specifications
- Length: 31 ft (9.4 m) (LOA)

Third Turtle was a trimaran designed by Dick Newick in the 1970s.

She finished second in the 1976 OSTAR trans-Atlantic race sailed by Mike Birch, coming in after a boat more than twice her size and a giant over seven and a half times her size.

== See also ==
- List of multihulls
- Dick Newick
- Mike Birch
- 1976 OSTAR
- Cheers (proa)
- Trice (trimaran)
