= Trine (trimaran) =

- Photograph by Fritz Henle of Trine, early 1960s.

Development
- Designer: Dick Newick
- Location: St. Croix, United States Virgin Islands
- Year: ca. early 1960s
- Name: Trine

Hull
- Type: Trimaran
- Construction: Probably plywood and fiberglass
- LOA: 32 ft (9.8 m)

Trine was a 32-foot trimaran sailboat designed by Dick Newick, one the earliest designs in his career (prior to the 36 ft (11 m) Trice), which contributed substantially to the revival of multihull vessels from the 1960s to the late 20th century.

== See also ==
- List of multihulls
- Trice
- Cheers
- Dick Newick
