= VSV =

VSV can refer to:

- Vesicular stomatitis virus, a virus in the family Rhabdoviridae
- Vishista Seva Vibhushanaya, a military decoration of Sri Lanka
- VSV EC, an Austrian ice hockey team
- Very Slender Vessel, a type of high speed boat
