= Single-Handed Trans-Atlantic Race =

Yacht race across the North Atlantic

- First held: 1960
- Organizer: OC Sport Pen Duick (Groupe Télégramme (France))
- Type: Single-handed sailing Yacht racing
- Start: Plymouth (England), Lorient (France)
- Finish: United States
- Website: rwyc.org/ostar www.thetransat.com

The Single-handed Trans-Atlantic Race (STAR) is an east-to-west yacht race across the North Atlantic, generally held quadrennially since 1960. Running from Plymouth in England to Newport, Rhode Island, it was the first single-handed ocean yacht race. It is organised by the Royal Western Yacht Club, and it was originally sponsored by The Observer, being known as The Observer Single-handed Trans-Atlantic Race. Due to changes in sponsorship, it has been known as the CSTAR, Europe 1 STAR, and the Europe 1 New Man STAR.

After the 2000 edition, the race was split by the RWYC, with one event, the OSTAR ("Original STAR"), involving amateurs and young sailors, using smaller boats, and the other, The Transat, dedicated for professionals.

== History ==
The Single-handed Trans-Atlantic Race was conceived by Herbert "Blondie" Hasler in 1956. The whole idea of a single-handed ocean yacht race was a revolutionary concept at the time, as the idea was thought to be extremely impractical; but this was especially true given the adverse conditions of their proposed route — a westward crossing of the north Atlantic Ocean, against the prevailing winds.

Hasler sought sponsorship for a race, but by 1959, no-one had been prepared to back the race. Finally, though, The Observer newspaper provided sponsorship, and in 1960, under the management of the Royal Western Yacht Club of England, the Observer Single-handed Trans-Atlantic Race, or OSTAR, was on.

The first run of the race was a great success; since then, it has run every four years, and has become firmly established as one of the major events on the yachting calendar. The name of the event has changed several times due to changes in main sponsor; it has been known as the CSTAR, Europe 1 STAR, and the Europe 1 New Man STAR. The professional event has been run as The Transat from 2004, while the race smaller boats is run as the OSTAR. Throughout its history, however, the essentials of the race have remained the same. It has also become known as a test-bed for new innovations in yacht racing; many new ideas started out in "the STAR".

The 2020 races were cancelled due to the COVID-19 pandemic.

== The race ==
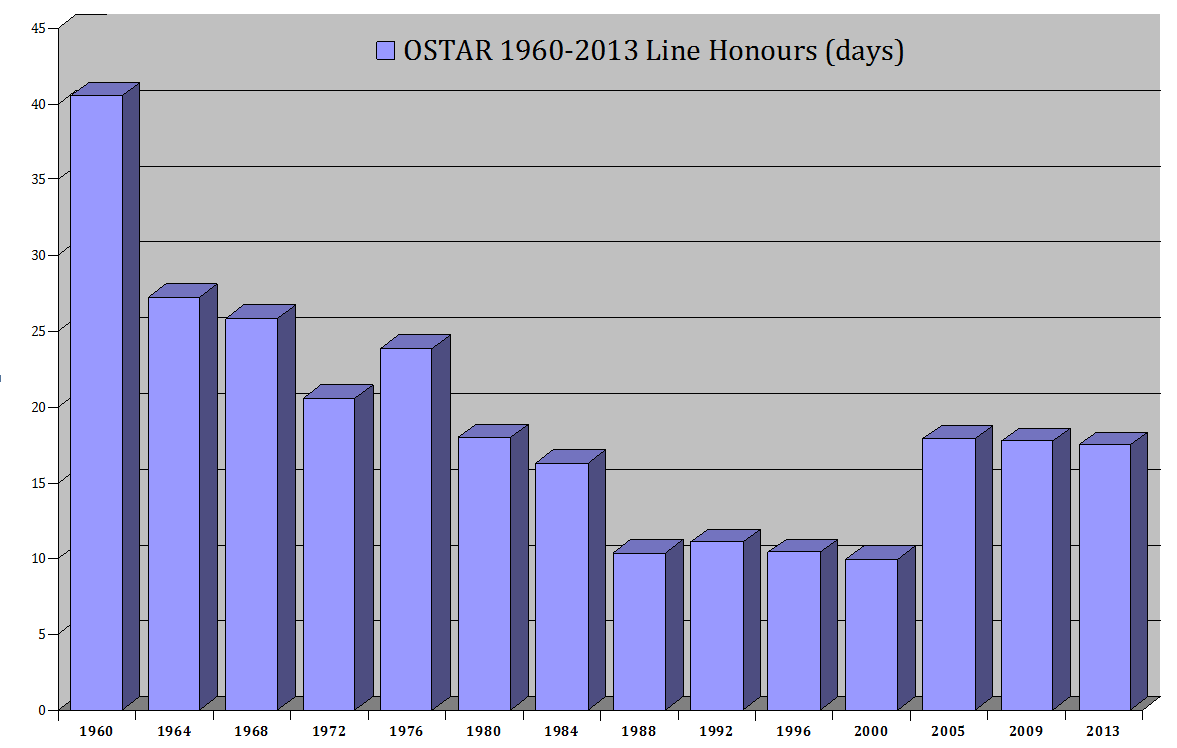
OSTAR Line Honours from 1960 to 2013

The course of the race is westwards against the prevailing winds of the north Atlantic over a distance of around 3,000 nautical miles (5,600 km). The first edition of the race was from Plymouth United Kingdom to New York City; the editions from 1964 to 2000 were sailed from Plymouth to Newport, Rhode Island; the 2004 event sailed from Plymouth to Boston, Massachusetts.

The actual course steered is the decision of the individual skipper, and the result of the race can hinge on the chosen route:

Rhumb line
The shortest route on paper — i.e. on a Mercator projection chart — is a route which steers a constant compass course, known as the rhumb line route; this is 2,902 nautical miles. This lies between 40 degrees and 50 degrees north, and avoids the most severe weather.
Great circle
The actual shortest route is the great circle route, which is 2,810 nautical miles (5,200 km). This goes significantly farther north; sailors following this route frequently encounter fog and icebergs.
Northern route
It is sometimes possible to avoid headwinds by following a far northern route, north of the great circle and above the track followed by depressions. This is a longer way, though, at 3,130 nautical miles (5,800 km), and places the sailor in greater danger of encountering ice.
Azores route
A "softer" option can be to sail south, close to the Azores, and across the Atlantic along a more southerly latitude. This route can offer calmer reaching winds, but is longer at 3,530 nautical miles (6,540 km); the light and variable winds can also lead to slow progress.
Trade wind route
The most "natural" way to cross the Atlantic westward is to sail south to the trade winds, and then west across the ocean. However, this is the longest route of all, at 4,200 nautical miles (7,780 km).

This variety of routes is one of the factors which makes an east-to-west north Atlantic crossing interesting, as different skippers try different strategies against each other. In practice, though, the winning route is usually somewhere between the great circle and the rhumb line.

== The OSTAR Edition ==
=== The OSTAR, 1960 ===
The Observer Single-handed Trans-Atlantic Race of 1960 was a milestone in sailing, being the first single-handed ocean yacht race. One hundred and fifteen people expressed an interest in the race, and there were eight entries, of whom five actually took part. Only four were at the starting line on June 11, however, as Jean Lacombe arrived late and started three days after the others. All of the boats were monohulls; this was to be the only edition of the race without multihulls. It was also the only edition of the race sailed from Plymouth to New York City.

The skippers tried a variety of routing strategies. Hasler chose the northern route, to avoid the depressions; Chichester and Lewis stayed closer to the great circle; Lacombe and Howells chose more southerly routes. Hasler sailed his junk-rigged Jester; Chichester had by far the longest boat, his 40-foot (12 m) Gipsy Moth III, and this was reflected in the results:

Pos.	Skipper	Boat	Class	Time
1	Francis Chichester (GBR)	Gipsy Moth III	Mono-40	40 days 12 hours 30 min
2	Blondie Hasler (GBR)	Jester	Mono-26	48 days 12 hours 02 min
3	David Lewis (GBR)	Cardinal Vertue	Mono-25	55 days 00 hours 50 min
4	Val Howells (GBR)	Eira	Mono-25	62 days 05 hours 50 min
5	Jean Lacombe (FRA)	Cap Horn	Mono-21.5	74 days ?? hours ?? min

The race had a huge impact on ocean sailing, and in particular solo sailing. Hasler's wind-vane self-steering gear revolutionised short-handed sailing, and his other major innovation — using a junk rig for safer and more manageable shorthanded sailing — influenced many subsequent sailors.

=== The OSTAR, 1964 ===
Thirteen competitors started the next edition of the race in 1964, which by now was firmly established on the racing scene. All of the five original competitors entered, and all five improved their original times; but the show was stolen by French naval officer Éric Tabarly, who entered a custom-built 44-foot (13 m) plywood ketch, Pen Duick II. The days of racers sailing the family boat were numbered following Tabarly's performance, for which he was awarded the Legion of Honour by president Charles de Gaulle. It is also noteworthy that Tabarly and Jean Lacombe were the only French entrants in this race; Tabarly's success was instrumental in popularising the sport in France, the country which in future years would come to dominate it.

This was to be the year in which several future trends were established. Multihulls made their first appearance — sailing in the same class as the other boats; and the race featured the use of radio, for the first time, by several competitors who gave daily progress reports to their sponsors.

Pos.	Skipper	Boat	Class	Time
1	Éric Tabarly (FRA)	Pen Duick II	Mono-44	27 days 03 hours 56 min
2	Francis Chichester (GBR)	Gipsy Moth III	Mono-40	29 days 23 hours 57 min
3	Val Howells (GBR)	Akka	Mono-35	32 days 18 hours 08 min
4	Alec Rose (GBR)	Lively Lady	Mono-36	36 days 17 hours 30 min
5	Blondie Hasler (GBR)	Jester	Mono-26	37 days 22 hours 05 min
6	Bill Howell (AUS)	Stardrift	Mono-30	38 days 03 hours 23 min
7	David Lewis (GBR)	Rehu Moana	Cat-40	38 days 12 hours 04 min
8	Mike Ellison (GBR)	Ilala	Mono-36	46 days 06 hours 26 min
9	Jean Lacombe (FRA)	Golif	Mono-22	46 days 07 hours 05 min
10	Bob Bunker (GBR)	Vanda Caelea	Mono-25	49 days 18 hours 45 min
11	Mike Butterfield (GBR)	Misty Miller	Cat-30	53 days 00 hours 05 min
12	Geoffrey Chaffey (GBR)	Ericht 2	Mono-31	60 days 11 hours 15 min
13	Derek Kelsall (GBR)	Folatre	Tri-35	61 days 14 hours 04 min
14	Axel Nymann Pedersen (DEN)	Marco Polo	Mono-28	63 days 13 hours 30 min
RET	Robin McCurdy (GBR)	Tammie Norie	Mono-40	retired

=== The OSTAR, 1968 ===
The race was by now acquiring a reputation for pushing forward the technology of ocean sailing, and the 1968 edition featured the first use of computer-based weather routing. A far cry from today's laptop-laden yachts, this consisted of a land-based mainframe computer, the English Electric KDF9, linked by radio to Geoffrey Williams in his boat Sir Thomas Lipton. Although outside private routing advice of this kind is no longer permitted in most "unassisted" races, it is now routine for ocean sailors to do similar analyses using their on-board computers to process public weather information.

Williams created another story by his use of the "shortcut" through the Nantucket Shoal. This dangerous route was supposed to be illegal, but due to an error the race instructions required skippers only to keep south of Nantucket, instead of Nantucket Light. Williams successfully navigated the treacherous route in a gale. Gales were a major feature of the race, with a large storm on the 11th of June, and Hurricane Brenda, both contributing to the large number of retired and abandoned boats. One casualty was Éric Tabarly, aboard his new trimaran Pen Duick IV, who collided with a cargo and sailed back to England with structural damage. Another was the first woman to have taken part, the West German Edith Baumann, aboard her 39-foot trimaran "Koala III".

Although won by a monohull, this race saw the multihulls firmly established on the scene. Thirteen of the thirty-five boats entered were multihulls, led by the controversial proa Cheers; many observers felt that a proa was entirely unsuitable for ocean sailing, but she made a fast time along the Azores route.

Pos.	Skipper	Boat	Class	Time
1	Geoffrey Williams (GBR)	Sir Thomas Lipton	Mono-57	25 days 20 hours 33 min
2	(South Africa) Bruce Dalling (RSA)	Voortrekker	Mono-50	26 days 13 hours 42 min
3	Tom Follett (USA)	Cheers	Proa-40	27 days 00 hours 13 min
4	Leslie Williams (GBR)	Spirit of Cutty Sark	Mono-53	29 days 10 hours 17 min
5	Bill Howell (AUS)	Golden Cockerel	Cat-42.5	31 days 16 hours 24 min
6	Brian Cooke (GBR)	Opus	Mono-32	34 days 08 hours 23 min
7	Martin Minter-Kemp (GBR)	Gancia Girl	Tri-42	34 days 13 hours 15 min
8	N.T.J. Bevan (GBR)	Myth of Malham	Mono-40	36 days 01 hours 41 min
9	B. de Castelbajac (FRA)	Maxine	Mono-34.5	37 days 13 hours 47 min
10	Jean-Yves Terlain (FRA)	Maguelonne	Mono-35	38 days 09 hours 10 min
11	N.S.A. Burgess (GBR)	Dog Watch	Mono-27	38 days 12 hours 13 min
12	Andre Foezon (FRA)	Sylvia II	Mono-36	40 days 00 hours 16 min
13	B. Enbom (SWE)	Fione	Mono-20	40 days 14 hours 13 min
14	Claus Hehner (GER)	Mex	Mono-37	41 days 10 hours 46 min
15	Revd. Stephen Packenham (GBR)	Rob Roy	Mono-32.5	42 days 03 hours 49 min
16	Colin Forbes (GBR)	Startled Faun	Tri-33	45 days 10 hours 08 min
17	B. Rodriguez (USA)	Amistad	Tri-25	47 days 18 hours 05 min
18	Mike Richey (GBR)	Jester	Mono-26	57 days 10 hours 40 min
DSQ	Ake Matteson (SWE)	Goodwin II	Mono-19.5	DSQ --
RET	Éric Tabarly (FRA)	Pen Duick IV	Tri-67	RET --
RET	Eric Willis (GBR)	Coila	Tri-50	ABN --
RET	Alex Carozzo (ITA)	San Giorgio	Cat-53	-- RET --
RET	David Pyle (GBR)	Atlantis III	Mono-26.5	-- RET --
RET	W. Wallin (SWE)	Wileca	Mono-27	-- RET --
RET	Comdt. B. Waquet (FRA)	Tamoure	Tri-26	-- RET --
RET	Edith Bauman (GER)	Koala III	Tri-39.5	-- ABN --
RET	Robert Wingate (GBR)	Zeevalk	Mono-39.5	-- RET --
RET	M.J. Pulsford (GBR)	White Ghost	Tri-34	-- RET --
RET	Egon Heinemann (GER)	Aye-Aye	Mono 33	-- RET --
RET	Guy Piazzini (SUI)	Guntar III	Mono-41	-- RET --
RET	A. Munro (GBR)	Ocean Highlander	Cat-45	-- RET --
RET	L. Paillard (FRA)	La Delirante	Mono-36	-- RET --
ABN	Marc Cuiklinski (FRA)	Ambrima	Mono-37	-- ABN --
ABN	Joan de Kat (FRA)	Yaksha	Tri-50	-- ABN --
RET	Alain Gliksman (FRA)	Ralph	Mono-58	-

The 17 non-finishers included Éric Tabarly on Pen Duick IV, and Alex Carozzo of Italy on San Giorgio. Carozzo went on to compete in the Sunday Times Golden Globe Race, the other major single-handed sailing event of the year.

=== The OSTAR, 1972 ===
Tabarly's trimaran Pen Duick IV made a return to the race in 1972, sailed by Alain Colas, at the head of a strong French contingent; of the 55 entrants, 12 were French, and the top three finishers were all French.

The average boat size was increasing rapidly, as longer boats are capable of higher speeds. A sign of the changing times was that the rules had a minimum size, to deter unsafe entries, but no maximum; and so the star of the monohull fleet was Vendredi 13 (Friday the 13th), a 128-foot (39 m) three-masted schooner — a huge boat for a single-hander. However, the race was now dominated by the multihulls, with Colas winning on a trimaran and four of the top six finishers being multis.

The 55 entrants included the first female finishers, two French and one Polish. Sir Francis Chichester, now 70 years old, sailed with the fleet in Gipsy Moth V; however, he was unable to complete what was to be his last race, and he died later the same year. Peter Crowther made the longest crossing in the race's history while sailing the oldest boat, the 66-year-old gaff cutter Golden Vanity; his crossing took 88 days.

The top ten finishers:

Pos.	Skipper	Boat	Class	Time
1	Alain Colas (FRA)	Pen Duick IV	Tri-70	20 days 13 hours 15 min
2	Jean-Yves Terlain (FRA)	Vendredi 13	Mono-128	21 days 05 hours 14 min
3	Jean-Marie Vidal (FRA)	Cap 33	Tri-53	24 days 05 hours 40 min
4	Brian Cooke (GBR)	British Steel	Mono-59	24 days 19 hours 28 min
5	Tom Follett (USA)	Three Cheers	Tri-46	27 days 11 hours 04 min
6	Gerard Pesty (FRA)	Architeuthis	Tri-55	28 days 11 hours 55 min
7	Martin Minter-Kemp (GBR)	Strongbow	Mono-65	28 days 12 hours 46 min
8	Alain Gliksman (FRA)	Toucan	Mono-34.5	28 days 12 hours 54 min
9	Franco Faggioni (ITA)	Sagittario	Mono-50.5	28 days 23 hours 05 min
10	James Ferris (USA)	Whisper	Mono-53.5	29 days 11 hours 15 min
11	Marc Linski (FRA)	Isles du Frioul	Mono-48	30 days 02 hours 45 min
12	Krzysztof Baranowski (POL)	Polonez	Mono-45	30 days 16 hours 55 min
13	Mike McMullen (GBR)	Binkie II	Mono-32	31 days 18 hours 10 min
14	Marie-Claude Fauroux (FRA)	Aloa VII	Mono-35	32 days 22 hours 51 min
15	Lt. Col. Jock Brazier (GBR)	Flying Angel	Mono-46	33 days 09 hours 21 min
16	Joel Charpentier (FRA)	Wild Rocket	Mono-63	34 days 13 hours 38 min
17	Yves Olivaux (FRA)	Aloa I	Mono 35	34 days 17 hours 30 min
18	Guy Piazzini (FRA)	Cambronne	Mono-45.5	35 days 10 hours 24 min
19	Pierre Chassin (FRA)	Concorde	Mono-43	36 days 01 hours 19 min
20	Bruce Webb (GBR)	Gazelle	Mono-47.5	36 days 02 hours 07 min
21	John Holtom (GBR)	La Bamba of Mersea	Mono-34	36 days 04 hours 30 min
22	Lt. Guy Hornet (GBR)	Blue Smoke	Mono-26	36 days 21 hours 26 min
23	Wolf-Dietrich Kirchner (GER)	White Dolphin	Mono-32	38 days 07 hours 17 min
24	Jock McLeod (GBR)	Ron Glas	Mono-47	38 days 09 hours 50 min
25	Richard Clifford (GBR)	Shamaal	Mono-25.5	38 days 10 hours 30 min
26	R. Lancy Burn (USA)	Blue Gipsy	Mono-28	39 days 08 hours 30 min
27	Philip Weld (USA)	Trumpeter	Tri-44	39 days 13 hours 25 min
28	Claus Hehner (GER)	Mex	Mono-35	40 days 08 hours 23 min
29	Ambrogio Fogar (ITA)	Surprise	Mono-38	41 days 04 hours 45 min
30	Capt. P. Chilton R.N. (GBR)	Mary Kate of Arun	Mono-38	41 days 17 hours 17 min
31	Lt Cdr (SCC) Eric Sumner RNR (GBR)	Francette	Mono-25	43 days 09 hours 38 min
32	Zbigniew Puchalski (POL)	Miranda	Mono-39	45 days 10 hours 05 min
33	Heiko Krieger (GER)	Tinie	Mono 26.5	46 days 15 hours 30 min
34	Jerry Cartwright (USA)	Scuffler III	Mono-32.5	49 days 02 hours 00 min
35	Christopher Elliott (GBR)	Lauric	Mono-34	51 days 14 hours 33 min
36	Andrew Spedding (GBR)	Summersong	Mono-28	51 days 23 hours 05 min
37	David Blagden (GBR)	Willing Griffin	Mono-19	52 days 11 0hours 6 min
38	Teresa Remiszewska (POL)	Komodor	Mono-42	57 days 03 hours 18 min
39	Mike Richey (GBR)	Jester	Mono-26	58 days 08 hours 18 min
40	Anne Michailof (FRA)	PS	Mono-30.5	59 days 06 hours 12 min
TLE	Richard Konkolski (CZE)	Nike	Mono-22.5	60 days 13 hours 12 min
TLE	Martin Wills (GBR)	Casper	Mono-31	63 days 22 hours 00 min
TLE	Peter Crowther (GBR)	Golden Vanity	Mono-38	88 days
ABN	Bob Miller (GBR)	Mersea Pearl	Mono-43	Boat Abandoned
RET	Carlo Mascheroni (ITA)	Chica Boba	Mono-41	-- RET --
RET	H.G. Mitchell (GBR)	Tuloa	Mono-33	-- RET --
RET	Bill Howell (AUS)	Tahiti Bill	Cat-43	-- RET --
RET	Gerard Dijkstra (NED)	Second Life	Mono-71	-- RET --
RET	Osca Debra (BEL)	Olva II	Mono-46.5	-- RET --
RET	Sir Francis Chichester (GBR)	Gipsy Moth V	Mono-57	-- RET --
RET	Murray Sayle (AUS)	Lady of Fleet	Cat-41	-- RET --
RET	Bob Salmon (GBR)	Justa Listang	Mono-25	-- RET --
RET	Eugene Riguidel (FRA)	Onyz	Mono-43	-- RET --
RET	Sqd. Ldr A. Barton (GBR)	Bristol Fashion	Mono-24.5	-- RET --
RET	Eduardo Guzzetti (ITA)	Namar IV	Mono-32.5	-- RET --

There were eleven retirements, and one boat was abandoned.

=== The OSTAR, 1976 ===
1976 saw the biggest edition of the race, in all senses. 125 boats entered, and the 128-foot (39 m) Vendredi 13 returned as ITT Oceanic. However, the all-time size record for the race, and probably for any single-hander, was set by Alain Colas, sailing the 236-foot (72 m) four-masted schooner Club Mediterranée. Although about the same overall length as HMS Victory (which had a crew of 820), this modern boat was expressly designed for easy handling.

At the start of the race, during login, in it was discovered that one of the entrants, David Sandeman, was under age at 17 years and 176 days, which was 189 days or 6 months under the youngest age permitted at the time. He had entered "Sea Raider", a 35 ft monohull which had very carefully been equipped and prepared in Jersey, Channel Islands for this race. David was not allowed to officially start, but he crossed the line unofficially after the last boat had left. Halfway across the Atlantic a Russian trawler ran into him in the dark during a storm after being warned with a red spotlight. The Russian crew never saw him, but their ship damaged the starboard mast halyards, which required substantial work by the Russian crew to repair the boat sufficiently to allow it to continue. David Sandeman was later listed in the Guinness Book of Records as being the youngest person to single-handedly sail the Atlantic between Jersey, UK, and Rhode Island.

The race was organised into three classes: Jester (J): up to 38 ft (12 m); Gipsy Moth (G): 38 to 65 ft (20 m); and Penduick (P): over 65 ft, unlimited. Monohulls and multihulls were not segregated. It is notable that the second-placed boat overall was a trimaran of the smallest class, and perhaps even more so that third place went to a monohull from the same class.

Two major depressions hit the race and caused a record fifty retirements. Yvon Fauconnier and Jean-Yves Terlain, two of the top favorites, lost their boats due to structural failure and were rescued by the same Soviet cargo ship. Tony Bullimore was rescued by a passing ship after his boat caught fire. The race also suffered two fatalities, the first in its history. Englishman Mike Flanagan, brother of renowned sculptor Barry Flanagan, was lost overboard from Galloping Gael. A particularly sad story was that of Mike McMullen, whose wife Lizzie was electrocuted and killed while helping him to prepare Three Cheers for the race, just two days before the start. Believing that Lizzie would have wanted him to go on, he started the race, but was never seen again.

Colas in Club Mediterranée was plagued by halyard problems; although 330 miles (531 km) in the lead, he was forced to pull into Halifax, Nova Scotia to make repairs, and was penalised 10% of his elapsed time (58 hours) for accepting help, which dropped him from second to fifth place. The race went to Éric Tabarly, whose surprise win on the 73-foot (22 m) Pen Duick VI (his radio had broken down and no one knew of his whereabouts until he crossed the finish line) was his second; it was also the last win for a monohull.

Clare Francis in Robertson's Golly (Ohlson 38) finished 13th and broke the women's single-handed transatlantic record by three days.

The top finishers (including the top three of each class):

Pos.	Skipper	Boat name	Class	Boat Type	Time
Class P
1	Éric Tabarly (FRA)	Pen Duick VI	P	Mono-73	23 days 20 hours 12 min
2	Tom Grossman (USA)	Cap 33	P	Tri-53	26 days 08 hours 15 min
3	Alain Colas (FRA)	Club Mediterranee	P	Mono-236	Correct 26 days 13 hours 36 min Elapsed 24 days 03 hours 36 min
ABN	Jean-Yves Terlain (FRA)	Kriter III	P	Cat-70	-- ABN --
RET	Yvon Fauconnier (FRA)	ITT Oceanic	P	Mono-128	-- RET --
RET	Michael Kane (USA)	Spirit of America	P	Tri-62	-- RET --
RET	Joel Charpentier (FRA)	Wild Rocket	P	Mono-63	-- RET --
Class G
1	Jean Claude Parisis (FRA)	Petrouchka	G	Mono-47	27 days 00 hours 55 min
2	Jaques Timsit (FRA)	Arauna IV	G	Mono-38	27 days 15 hours 32 min
3	Francis Stokes (USA)	Moonshine	G	Mono-40	28 days 12 hours 46 min
4	Carlo Bianchi (ITA)	Venilia	G	Mono-54	29 days 00 hours 15 min
5	John de Trafford (GBR)	Quest	G	Tri-54	30 days 07 hours 30 min
6	Patrice Duma (FRA)	Sirtec	G	Mono-39	31 days 23 hours 09 min
7	Guy Hornett (GBR)	Old Moore's Almanac	G	Tri-42	32 days 02 hours 06 min
8	Bill Howell (AUS)	Tahiti Bill	G	Cat-43	32 days 05 hours 19 min
9	Ernesto Raab (ITA)	Carina	G	Mono-41	33 days 01 hours 22 min
10	E. Everett-Smith (USA)	Wind Quest	G	Mono-40	34 days 08 hours 44 min
11	Edoardo Austoni (ITA)	Chica Boba	G	Mono-41	37 days 06 hours 00 min
12	Jock McCleod (GBR)	Ron Glas	G	Mono-47	38 days 17 hours 40 min
13	Juan Guiu (ESP)	Crisan	G	Mono-38	39 days 08 hours 15 min
14	Peter Crowther (GBR)	Galway Blazer	G	Mono-42	39 days 12 hours 57 min
15	Zbigniew Puchalski (POL)	Miranda	G	Mono-38	42 days 13 hours 14 min
16	Michel Bourgeois (FRA)	Dragon	G	Mono-37.5	45 days 12 hours 45 min
17	Gerard Dijkstra (NED)	Bestevaer	G	Mono-54	49 days 07 hours 22 min
18	Eilco Kasemier (NED)	Bylgia	G	Mono-40	49 days 10 hours 34 min
MOB	Mike McMullen (GBR)	Three Cheers	G	Tri-46	Sailor Lost at Sea
ABN	Tony Bullimore (GBR)	Toria	G	Tri-42	Abandoned boat due to fire
ABN	Pierre Fehlman (FRA)	Gauloise	G	Mono-57	Abandoned boat as sank
ABN	P. Szekely (FRA)	Nyarlathotep	G	Mono-42	-- ABN --
RET	Kees Roemers (NED)	Bollemaat	G	Mono 45	-- RET --
RET	R.J. Ogle (GBR)	Jade	G	Mono-51	-- RET --
RET	Jock Brazier (GBR)	Flying Angel	G	Mono-63	-- RET --
RET	Edoardo Guzzetti (ITA)	Namar V	G	Mono-45	-- RET --
RET	Paolo Sciarretta (ITA)	Valitalia	G	Mono-42	-- RET --
RET	Gerard Frigout (FRA)	Pen Ar Bed	G	Mono-40	-- RET --
RET	Doi Malingri di Bagnolo (ITA)	CS & RB II	G	Mono-60	-- RET --
RET	Jean Claud Montesinos (FRA)	Keep Cap D'Agde	G	Mono-53	-- RET --
RET	Mike Best (GBR)	Croda Way	G	Tri-35	-- RET --
RET	C.H. Le Moing (FRA)	Pronuptia	G	Mono-43	-- RET --
RET	Alain Marcel (FRA)	Drakkar III	G	Mono-39	-- RET --
RET	Oscar Debra (BEL)	Vanessa	G	Mono-43	-- RET --
RET	C.S.W. Ward (GBR)	Altergo	G	Tri-39	-- RET --
Class J
1	Mike Birch (CAN)	The Third Turtle	J	Tri-32	24 days 20 hours 39 min
2	Kazimierz Jaworski (POL)	Spaniel	J	Mono-38	24 days 23 hours 40 min
3	David Palmer (GBR)	FT	J	Tri-35	27 days 07 hours 45 min
4	Walter Greene (USA)	Friends	J	Tri-30	27 days 10 hours 37 min
5	Alain Gabbay (FRA)	Objectif Sud 3	J	Mono-38	28 days 09 hours 58 min
6	Clare Francis (GBR)	Robertson's Golly	J	Mono-37.5	29 days 04 hours 22 min
7	Gustav Versluys (BEL)	Tyfoon V	J	Mono-34.5	29 days 21 hours 12 min
8=	Yves Anrys (BEL)	Pawn of Nieuport	J	Mono-30	30 days 15 hours 34 min
8=	Eugene Riguidel (FRA)	Nova	J	Tri-33	30 days 15 hours 34 min
10	Gilles Vaton (FRA)	Ackel France	J	Mono-38	31 days 03 hours 12 min
11	Daniel Pierre (FRA)	Lorca	J	Mono-29.5	31 days 14 hours 45 min
12	Geoff Hales (GBR)	Wild Rival	J	Mono-34	32 days 13 hours 48 min
13	Bernard Pallard (FRA)	Petit Breton	J	Mono-33.5	32 days 19 hours 57 min
14	Folkmar Graf (GER)	Dadztoy II	J	Mono-38	32 days 20 hours 55 min
15	Rome Ryott (GBR)	Adhara	J	Mono-33.5	33 days 02 hours 54 min
16	Pierre Riboulet (FRA)	Pierre	J	Mono-38	33 days 03 hours 39 min
17	Gerd Bucking (GER)	Helene III	J	Mono-35	33 days 08 hours 41 min
18	Richard Clifford (GBR)	Shamaal II	J	Mono-25.5	33 days 12 hours 51 min
19	Burg Vennemans (NED)	Pytheas	J	Mono-38	34 days 10 hours 10 min
20	Nicholas Clifton (GBR)	Azuloa	J	Tri-32	35 days 03 hours 35 min
21	John Mansell (NZL)	Innovator of Mana	J	Mono-28	35 days 12 hours 25 min
22	Philip Howells (GBR)	Fromstock Filius	J	Mono-28	35 days 16 hours 07 min
23	D. H. Clark (GBR)	Freemerle	J	Mono-32	35 days 22 hours 50 min
24	Georgi Georgiev (BUL)	Kor Karoli	J	Mono-30	36 days 01 hours 50 min
25	Yves Olivaux (FRA)	Patriarche	J	Mono-33.5	36 days 05 hours 14 min
26	Ian Radford (GBR)	Jabulisiwe	J	Mono-28	38 days 08 hours 44 min
27	Lars Wallgren (SWE)	Swedlady	J	Mono-27.5	36 days 11 hours 10 min
28	Ida Castiglioni (ITA)	Eva	J	Mono-34.5	37 days 10 hours 20 min
29	Elie Labourgade (FRA)	Evaloa	J	Mono-34	37 days 10 hours 24 min
30	Klaus Schrodt (GER)	Lilliam	J	Mono-29.5	37 days 21 hours 25 min
31	Rory Nugent (USA)	Edith	J	Tri-31	39 days 04 hours 30 min
32	Chris Butler (GBR)	Achilles Neuf	J	Mono-30	39 days 06 hours 02 min
33	Richard Konkolski (CZE)	Nike	J	Mono 22.5	39 days 10 hours 49 min
34	James Young (GBR)	English Rose	J	Mono 30	39 days 11 hours 29 min
35	David White (USA)	Catapha	J	Mono-32	39 days 17 hours 15 min
36	H.G. Mitchell (GBR)	Tuloa	J	Mono-33	41 days 11 hours 59 min
37	Enrique Vidal Paz (ESP)	Castenuela	J	Mono-34	42 days 10 hours 10 min
38	David Pyle (GBR)	Westward	J	Mono-30	42 days 10 hours 11 min
39	Wolfgang Wanders (GER)	Amitie	J	Mono-35	42 days 17 hours 30 min
40	Henk Jukkema (NED)	Hesperia	J	Mono-29.5	42 days 21 hours 18 min
41	Max Bourgeois (FRA)	Achille	J	Mono-33	43 days 08 hours 41 min
42	Corrado di Majo (ITA)	Tikka III	J	Mono-37	44 days 00 hours 37 min
43	David Sutcliffe (GBR)	Lady Anne of St Donats	J	Mono-25.5	44 days 03 hours 47 min
44	Angelo Preden (ITA)	Caipirinha	J	Mono-30	44 days 04 hours 45 min
45	Stuart Woods (IRL)	Golden Harp	J	Mono-30	44 days 19 hours 14 min
46	Martin Wills (GBR)	Casper	J	Mono-31	44 days 21 hours 05 min
47	Richard Elliott (GBR)	Lauric	J	Mono-34	45 days 02 hours 29 min
48	Henry Pottle (GBR)	Janina	J	Mono-25	45 days 03 hours 12 min
49	David Cowper (GBR)	Airedale	J	Mono-29.5	46 days 11 hours 17 min
50	Nigel Lang (GBR)	Galadriel of Lothlorien	J	Mono-25.5	48 days 03 hours 10 min
51	Rodney Kendall (NZL)	Songeur	J	Mono-24	49 days 05 hours 40 min
52	Bob Lengyel (USA)	Prodigal	J	Mono-25	49 days 19 hours 30 min
MOB	Mike Flanagan (USA)	Galloping Gael	J	Mono-38	Sailor and Boat Lost at Sea
OUT	Rod White (GBR)	Bluff	J	Mono-26	-- OUT --
OUT	Peter Evans (GBR)	Meinwen	J	Mono-32	-- OUT --
OUT	Jean Ropert (FRA)	Bigouden Brise	J	Mono-27.5	-- OUT --
OUT	Dr F. Sloan (GBR)	Ballyclaire	J	Mono-33.5	-- OUT --
OUT	Anthony Lush (USA)	One Hand Clapping	J	Mono-28	-- OUT --
ABN	Dominique Berthier (FRA)	5100	J	Mono-37	-- ABN --
RET	Heiko Krieger (GER)	Tinie II	J	Mono-36	-- RET --
RET	Hans Schulte (GER)	Silke	J	Mono-25	-- RET --
RET	Mike Richey (GBR)	Jester	J	Mono-26	-- RET --
RET	Val Howells (GBR)	Unibras Brython	J	Mono-38	-- RET --
RET	Ambrogio Fogar (ITA)	Spirit of Surprise	J	Cat-25	-- RET --
RET	Andre de Jong (NED)	Aquarius	J	Mono-28	-- RET --
RET	John Christian (GBR)	Et Soeki	J	Mono-27	-- RET --
RET	Christian le Merrer (FRA)	Acteia II	J	Mono-39	-- RET --
RET	Pierre Yves Charbonnier (FRA)	Karate	J	Mono-33	-- RET --
RET	Chris Smith (GBR)	Tumult	J	Mono-23	-- RET --
RET	Marc Linksy (FRA)	Objectif Sud I	J	Mono-38	-- RET --
RET	Angus Primrose (GBR)	Demon Demo	J	Mono-33	-- RET --
RET	Patrick O'Donovan (IRL)	Silmaril	J	Tri-31	-- RET --
RET	Guy Cornou (FRA)	Kervilor	J	Mono-34	-- ABN --
RET	Paolo Mascheroni (ITA)	Panda 31	J	Mono-32	-- RET --
RET	Mike Richardson (GBR)	Arctic Skua	J	Mono-31	-- RET --
RET	Andrew Bray (GBR)	Gillygaloo	J	Mono-32	-- RET --
RET	Colin Drummond (GBR)	Sleuth Hound	J	Mono-32	-- RET --
RET	Aline Marchard (FRA)	Logo	J	Mono-38	-- RET --
RET	Guy Brunet (FRA)	Ironiguy	J	Mono-32	-- RET --
RET	Jonathan Virden (GBR)	Sharavoge	J	Mono-25	-- RET --
RET	Simon Hunter (GBR)	Kylie	J	Mono-26	-- RET --
ABN	Yann Nedellec (FRA)	Objectif Sud 2	J	Mono-38	-- ABN --
RET	Brian Start (CAN)	True North	J	Mono-36	-- RET --

=== The 1/OSTAR, 1980 ===
The 1980 race introduced a length limit of 56 feet overall, to curb the excesses of previous races. The class sizes were adjusted downwards: Jester (J): up to 32 ft (10 m); Gipsy Moth (G): 32 to 44 ft (13 m); Penduick (P): 44 to 56 ft (17 m). The new restrictions were unpopular with some sailors, particularly the French, many of whom opted to sail instead in the new Route du Rhum race.

The race was once again dominated by multihulls, with the top five places all taken by trimarans, and marked the end of even competition between monos and multis. Éric Tabarly was to compete, aboard the hydrofoil trimaran Paul Ricard, but was unable to enter due to injury. The race continued its history of innovation with the first use of the Argos satellite-based tracking system; this system allows boats to be tracked during the race, and can also be used to signal distress. The use of this system has now become a major feature of many ocean races, such as the Vendée Globe. The cost of the system was covered by introducing a new race sponsor, the radio station Europe 1, in conjunction with the Observer.

The winner was American Phil Weld, in only his second OSTAR, whose trimaran Moxie was custom built to the 56-foot (17 m) limit; he set a new course record of 18 days. Many were impressed by this popular sailor's win at the age of 65. The preponderance of larger boats, and particularly multihulls, left the smaller Jesters seriously outclassed; the highest-placed was Free Newspapers, sailed by John Chaundy, who finished in 29th place, with a time of 28 days., RWYC OSTAR Race Results - 1980

Dame Naomi James, who became the second lady to circumnavigate the globe single-handedly in 1977/78 was reunited with the Express Crusader (fitted out and renamed Kriter Lady) for the race. She was the first woman back and broke the women's speed record. Her husband Rob James also competed in that race, finishing twelfth in the trimaran Boatfile.

Pos.	Skipper	Boat	!Class	Time	Ref.
Class
1	Philip Weld (USA)	Moxie	P	Tri-51	17 days 23 hours 12 min
2	Nick Keig (GBR)	Three Legs of Man III	P	Tri-53	18 days 06 hours 04 min
3	Mike Birch (CAN)	Olympus Photo	P	Tri-46	18 days 07 hours 15 min
4	Kazimierz Jaworski (POL)	Spaniel II	P	Mono-56	19 days 13 hours 25 min
5	Edoardo Austoni (ITA)	Chica Boba	P	Mono-56	20 days 02 hours 30 min
6	Tom Grossman (USA)	Kriter VII	P	Tri-56	21 days 08 hours 01 min
7	Olivier de Kersauson (FRA)	Kriter VI	P	Mono-54	21 days 20 hours 30 min
8	Pierre Sicouri (ITA)	Guia Fila	P	Mono-44	22 days 02 hours 34 min
9	Bertie Reed (RSA)	Voortrekker	P	Mono-49	23 days 12 hours 42 min
10	Eugene Riguidel (FRA)	V.S.D.	P	Tri-52	24 days 01 hours 27 min
11	Jean Pierre Millet (FRA)	Open Space	P	Mono-52	25 days 01 hours 05 min
12	Victor Sagi (ESP)	Garuda	P	Mono-48	25 days 08 hours 23 min
13	Naomi James (GBR)	Kriter Lady	P	Mono-53	25 days 19 hours 12 min
14	Beppe Panada (ITA)	Mulat	P	Mono-56	42 days 18 hours 20 min
15	Burg Veenemans (NED)	Pytheas II	P	Mono-47	49 days 08 hours 16 min
RET	Eric Loizeau (FRA)	Gauloise IV	P	Mono-53	-- RET --
RET	J.C. Parisis (FRA)	Charles Heidsieck II	P	Mono-48	-- RET --
RET	Michel Horeau (FRA)	Maurice Lidchi	P	Tri-51	-- RET --
RET	Warren Luhrs (USA)	Tuesday's Child	P	Mono-54	-- RET --
RET	Czeslaw Gogol-kiewicz (POL)	Raczynski II	P	Mono-56	-- RET --
Class
1	Philip Steggall (USA)	Jeans Foster	G	Tri-38	18 days 06 hours 45 min
2	Walter Greene (USA)	Chaussettes Olympia	G	Tri-35	18 days 17 hours 29 min
3	Daniel Gilard (FRA)	Brittany Ferries I	G	Mono-44	21 days 00 hours 09 min
4	Richard Konkolski (CZE)	Nike II	G	Mono 44	21 days 06 hours 21 min
5	Wolfgang Wanders (GER)	Stadt Krefeld	G	Mono-44	21 days 14 hours 22 min
6	Gustaf Versluys (BEL)	Typhoon VI	G	Mono-44	21 days 15 hours 01 min
7	Alain Labbe (FRA)	Hydrofolie	G	Tri-42	21 days 15 hours 51 min
8	Robert James (GBR)	Boatfile	G	Tri-31	22 days 22 hours 55 min
9	Dennis Gliksman (FRA)	France Loisirs	G	Mono-44	23 days 10 hours 00 min
10	Philippe Fournier (FRA)	Haute-Nendaz	G	Mono-36.5	24 days 03 hours 05 min
11	Francis Stokes (USA)	Moonshine	G	Mono-40	25 days 14 hours 07 min
12	Bill Homewood (USA)	The Third Turtle	G	Tri-32	25 days 20 hours 13 min
13	Robert Bocinsky (USA)	Ambergris	G	Mono-37	26 days 00 hours 39 min
14	Jean-Jaques Jaouen (FRA)	Les Menuires	G	Mono-44	26 days 15 hours 21 min
15	Jerzy Rakowicz (POL)	Spaniel	G	Mono-38	26 days 19 hours 29 min
16	William Doelger (USA)	Edith	G	Tri-31	28 days 04 hours 10 min
17	Uno Hylen (SWE)	Yoldia	G	Mono-37	28 days 05 hours 48 min
18	Desmond Hampton (GBR)	Wild Rival	G	Mono-34	28 days 13 hours 44 min
19	John Charnley (GBR)	Atlantic Harp	G	Mono-43	29 days 06 hours 21 min
20	John Oswald (GBR)	Moonshadow Basildon	G	Mono-37.5	30 days 15 hours 30 min
21	Oscar Debra (BEL)	Crumpy Nut	G	Mono-43	30 days 16 hours 32 min
22	Richard Clifford (GBR)	Warrior Shamaal	G	Mono 35	30 days 16 hours 45 min
23	Kees Roemers (NED)	Bollemaat IV	G	Mono-44	30 days 21 hours 24 min
24	Angus Primrose (GBR)	Demon of Hamble	G	Mono-33	30 days 23 hours 08 min
25	Roger Forkert (FRA) (USA)	Parisien Libere	G	Tri 38	31 days 10 hours 45 min
26	Guy Bernadin (FRA)	Ratso II	G	Mono-38	31 days 11 hours 45 min
27	Don Clark (GBR)	Abacus	G	Mono-41.5	32 days 07 hours 17 min
18	Thomas Gochberg (USA)	Mistral	G	Mono-41.5	32 days 18 hours 35 min
29	Nikolay Djambazov (BUL)	Tangra	G	Mono-36	34 days 10 hours 53 min
30	Wijtze van der Zee (NED)	Black Pearl	G	Mono-41	35 days 11 hours 20 min
31	Jose Ugarte (ESP)	North Wind	G	Mono-39	36 days 06 hours 43 min
32	Paul Rodgers (GBR)	Christian Saul	G	Tri-34	37 days 03 hours 11 min
33	Juin Guiu (ESP)	Crisan	G	Mono-38	38 days 14 hours 33 min
34	J. R. Verwoerd (NED)	Seagull II	G	Mono-33	38 days 17 hours 00 min
35	Tom Ryan (USA)	Peggy	G	Tri-31	40 days 20 hours 16 min
36	Ernest Sonne (USA)	Elbe	G	Mono-36	41 days 10 hours 45 min
37	John Beharrell (GBR)	Miscin	G	Mono-38	42 days 10 hours 00 min
OUT	Anthony Vassiliadis (GRE)	Old Navy Lights	G	Mono-34.5	-- OUT --
RET	Piet ter Laag (NED)	Lady Dona	G	Mono-34	-- RET --
ABN	Jacques Timsit (FRA)	Motorola	G	Mono-38	-- ABN --
OUT	Hans Schulte (GER)	Silke	G	Mono-38	-- OUT --
ABN	Nicholas Clifton (GBR)	Fleury Michon	G	Proa-42	-- ABN --
ABN	Theo Cockerell (GBR)	Roundabout	G	Mono-36.5	-- ABN --
ABN	Peter Philips (GBR)	Livery Dole	G	Tri-35	-- ABN --
RET	Mac Smith (USA)	Sea Quest	G	Mono 39	-- RET --
ABN	Antonio Chioatto (ITA)	Mattia III	G	Tri-36	-- ABN --
RET	Judith Lawson (USA)	Serta Perfect Sleeper	G	Mono-32	-- RET --
Class
1	John Chaundy (GBR)	Free Newspapers	J	Mono-32	28 days 00 hours 56 min
2	lan Radford (GBR)	Jabulisiwe	J	Mono-28	30 days 14 hours 38 min
3	Henk Jukkema (NED)	Victoria	J	Mono-31	30 days 18 hours 02 min
4	Chris Smith (GBR)	Sadler Bluejacket	J	Mono-25	30 days 19 hours 20 min
5	Chris Butler (GBR)	Achillea	J	Mono-28	30 days 20 hours 49 min
6	James Kyle (USA)	Dream Weaver	J	Mono-27	31 days 23 hours 05 min
7	Alain Veyron (FRA)	Cat Marine	J	Tri-28	32 days 02 hours 50 min
8	Luis Tonizzo (USA)	Egret	J	Mono-27	33 days 05 hours 25 min
9	Henk van de Weg (NED)	Tjisje	J	Mono-29.5	36 days 22 hours 22 min
10	Wolfgang Quix (GER)	Jeantex	J	Mono-31	38 days 03 hours 02 min
11	Giampaola Venturin (ITA)	Cecco	J	Mono-26	38 days 08 hours 55 min
12	Bob Lush (CAN)	Olympus Sailing	J	Mono-25	39 days 01 hours 46 min
13	Tony Lush (USA)	One Hand Clapping	J	Mono-32	39 days 06 hours 56 min
14	Andre de Jong (NED)	La Peligrosa	J	Mono-30.5	39 days 16 hours 55 min
15	Bon Lengyel (USA)	Prodigal	J	Mono-25	40 days 06 hours 09 min
16	John Hunt (USA)	Crystal Catfish	J	Mono-31	41 days 13 hours 18 min
17	Per Mustelin (FIN)	Mare	J	Mono-30	43 days 03 hours 34 min
18	William Wallace (USA)	Novia	J	Mono-30	44 days 10 hours 42 min
19	Martin Wills (GBR)	Casper	J	Mono-31	46 days 13 hours 52 min
DSQ	Jerry Cartwright (USA)	Le First	J	Mono-32	26 days 22 hours 55 min (DSQ)
ABN	Michael Richey (GBR)	Jester	J	Mono-26	-- OUT --
RET	Simon Hunter (GBR)	Jomada	J	Mono-30	-- RET --
RET	Bernard Pallard (FRA)	Brittany Ferries II	J	Mono-29.5	-- RET --

Canadian skippers Mike Birch and Bob Lush were the subject of a National Film Board of Canada documentary Singlehanders, released in 1982.

=== The 1/OSTAR, 1984 ===
The 1984 race saw the pace of technical innovation continue to accelerate. Custom-built trimarans were again the main force, but the monohulls also advanced, with the introduction of water ballast and other innovations. Some controversy over the size limitations in the previous race resulted in slightly larger classes, and the removal of restrictions on bow and stern overhangs; yachts were divided into five classes, but still with no distinction between monohulls and multihulls. Europe 1 continued to support the race, and Argos beacons were again used by all boats.

The first day of the race saw several dismastings in strong gales, and several skippers were awarded time for rescuing other racers. This resulted in an upset at the finish — Philippe Poupon, sailing the 56-foot (17 m) trimaran Fleury Michon VI, arrived first with a time of 16 days 12 hours, and went to bed thinking that he had won. But the race was awarded to Yvon Fauconnier, who finished 10 hours later but was given a 16-hour time allowance for rendering assistance to Philippe Jeantot, whose catamaran Credit Agricole had capsized. The winner among the monohulls was Warren Luhrs, in his 60-footer Thursday's Child.

Pos.	Skipper	Boat	Class	Type	Time	Ref.
Class 1
1	Yvon Fauconnier (FRA)	Umupro Jardin V	I	Tri-53	Corrected 16 days 06 hours 25 min Elapsed 16 days 22 hours 25 min	
2	Philippe Poupon (FRA)	Fleury Michon	I	Tri-56	16 days 12 hours 25 min	
3	Marc Pajot (FRA)	Elf Aquitaine II	I	Cat-59	16 days 12 hours 48 min	
4	Éric Tabarly (FRA)	Paul Ricard	I	Tri-60	16 days 14 hours 21 min	
5	Peter Philips (GBR)	Travacrest Seaway	I	Tri-60	16 days 17 hours 23 min	
6	Daniel Gilard (FRA)	Nantes	I	Tri-60	16 days 17 hours 51 min	
7	Bruno Peyron (FRA)	L'Aiglon	I	Cat-60	16 days 20 hours 21 min	
8	Francois Boucher (FRA)	Ker Cadelac	I	Tri-50	16 days 21 hours 48 min	
9	Warren Luhrs (USA)	Thursday's Child	I	Mono-60	16 days 22 hours 27 min	
10	Vincent Levy (FRA)	Kermarine	I	Tri-50	17 days 04 hours 28 min	
11	John Martin (RSA)	Mainstay Voortrekker	I	Mono-60	17 days 22 hours 02 min	
12	Denis Gliksman (FRA)	Lessive St Marc	I	Tri-50	17 days 22 hours 17 min	
13	Edoardo Austoni (ITA)	Chica Boba III	I	Tri-60	19 days 10 hours 41 min	
14	Jack Boye (USA)	Carteret Savings	I	Tri-54	21 days 01 hours 50 min	
15	Alain Petit-Etienne (FRA)	Region De Picardie	I	Mono-60	21 days 08 hours 47 min	
16	David White (USA)	Gladiator	I	Mono-55	28 days 04 hours 38 min	
RET	Florence Arthaud (FRA)	Biotherm II	I	Tri-60	Damaged	
RET	Jeff Houlgrave (GBR)	Colt Cars GB	I	Tri-60	Dismasted	
RET	Gilles Gahinet (FRA)	33 Export	I	Cat-60	Damaged	
RET	Hugh McCoy (GBR)	Fury	I	Cat-60	Damaged	
RET	June Clarke	Batchelors Sweet Pea	I	Tri	Pitchpoled 6 hours after start rescued by lifeboat	
RET	Loïck Peyron (FRA)	Lada Poch	I	Cat-54	Dismasted	
RET	Michel Horeau (FRA)	Marchés de France	I	Tri-50	Damaged	
RET	Philippe Jeantot (FRA)	Crédit Agricole	I	Cat-60	Capsized	
RET	Patrick Morvan (FRA)	Jet Services	I	Cat-60	Damaged	
Class 2
1	Olivier Moussy (FRA)	Region Centre	II	Tri-45	16 days 19 hours 16 min	
2	Didier Munduteguy (FRA)	Cote Basque	II	Tri 45	18 days 13 hours 34 min	
3	Yves Le Cornec (FRA)	Idenek	II	Tri 42	18 days 13 hours 49 min	
4	Walter Greene (USA)	Sebago	II	Mono-45	19 days 10 hours 38 min	
5	Patrice Carpentier (FRA)	Cenet	II	Cat-45	21 days 06 hours 02 min	
6	Guy Bernadin (FRA)	Biscuits Lu	II	Mono-44	21 days 18 hours 35 min	
7	Jose Ugarte (ESP)	Orion Iru	II	Mono-45	22 days 15 hours 53 min	
8	Simon van Hagen (NED)	Betelgeuze	II	Mono-42	25 days 05 hours 50 min	
9	Colin Laird (TRI)	La Baleine	II	Mono-44	25 days 15 hours 29 min	
10	Jerry Freeman (GBR)	Abacus	II	Mono-42	27 days 11 hours 11 min	
11	Mac Smith (USA)	Quailo	II	Mono-44	29 days 23 hours 10 min	
12	Goos Terschegget (NED)	De Volharding	II	Mono-41	41 days 20 hours 20 min	
RET	Eric Loizeau (FRA)	Roger & Gallet	II	Tri-45	Damaged	
RET	Frank Wood (GBR)	Marsden	II	Tri-45	Dismasted	
RET	Gustav Versluys (BEL)	Tyfoon VI	II	Mono-44	Damaged	
RET	Monique Brand (FRA)	Alliance Kaypro	II	Mono-44	Dismasted	
Class 3
1	Jack Petith (USA)	Destination St Croix	III	Tri 38	18 days 12 hours 31 hours 1 min	
2	Philippe Fournier (SUI)	Gespac	III	Cat 40	19 days 07 hours 50 min	
3	Tony Bullimore (GBR)	City of Birmingham	III	Mono-40	19 days 22 hours 35 min	
4	Kai Granholm (FIN)	Patricia of Finland	III	Mono-40	21 days 13 hours 04 min	
5	Ian Radford (GBR)	Ntombifuti	III	Mono-40	22 days 16 hours 13 min	
6	Qlivier Dardel (FRA)	Alcatel	III	Cat-37.5	24 days 13 hours 10 min	
7	John Shaw (GBR)	Ms Patty	III	Mono-40	24 days 14 hours 53 min	
8	Wijtze van de Zee (NED)	Royal Leerdam	III	Mono-40	24 days 18 hours 05 min	
9	Tom Donnelly (USA)	Lone Eagle	III	Mono-36	26 days 06 hours 46 min	
10	Alan Wynne-Thomas (GBR)	Jemima Nicholas	III	Mono-40	26 days 18 hours 21 min	
11	Alan Perkes (GBR)	Sherpa Bill	III	Mono-36	27 days 11 hours 50 min	
12	Hans van Hest (NED)	Olle P2	III	Mono-38.5	30 days 04 hours 10 min	
13	Spencer Langford (USA)	Summer Salt	III	Mono-38	30 days 12 hours 43 min	
14	Robert Scott (USA)	Lands End	III	Mono-39.5	31 days 23 hours 10 min	
RET	Bob Menzies (AUS)	Dancing Dolphin	Mono-37	III	Damaged	
RET	June Clarke (GBR)	Batchelors Sweet Pea	Tri-40	III	Capsized	
Class 4
1	Luis Tonizzo (USA)	City of Slidel	IV	Mono-35	20 days 23 hours 40 min	
2	Bill omewood (USA)	British Airways II	IV	Mono-31	21 days 05 hours 34 min	
3	Tony Lush (USA)	Survival Tech Group	IV	Mono-35	22 days 02 hours 39 min	
4	Jim Bates (USA)	Big Shot	IV	Cat-35	22 days 18 hours 09 min	
5	Alain Veyron (FRA)	Vingt Sur Vannes	IV	Mono-35	23 days 13 hours 44 min	
6	Bruno Fehrenbach (FRA)	Douche Champion	IV	Mono-35	25 days 03 hours 53 min	
7	Henk Jukkema (NED)	LDS Sailer	IV	Mono-33	25 days 09 hours 12 min	
8	Brian O'Donoghue (GBR)	Gamble Gold	IV	Mono-33	29 days 15 hours 55 min	
9	Bertus Buys (NED)	Sea-Beryl	IV	Mono-35	32 days 10 hours 09 min	
10	John Howie (USA)	Free Bird	IV	Mono-31.5	35 days 04 hours 33 min	
11	Dick Hughes (NED)	Gladys	IV	Mono-34	39 days 06 hours 56 min	
12	Timothy Hubbard (USA)	Johan Lloyde	IV	Mono-32	41 days 04 hours 30 min	
13	Jack Coffey (IRL)	Meg of Muglins	IV	Mono-35	41 days 16 hours 30 min	
14	John Hunt (USA)	Crystal Catfish	IV	Mono-31.5	44 days 14 hours 22 min	
RET	Andrede Jong (NED)	La Peligrosa	Mono-31	IV	Damaged	
RET	Bob Lengyel (USA)	Prodigal	Mono-34	IV	Damaged	
RET	Jacques Vuylsteker (FRA)	Jeremi V	Mono-35	IV	Damaged	
RET	John Mansell (NZL)	Double Brown	Cat-35	IV	Damaged	
RET	Karl Peterzen (SWE)	Karpetz	Mono-31.5	IV	Damaged	
RET	Rachel Hayward (GBR)	Loiwing	Mono-35	IV	Aground	
Class 5
1	Chris Butler (GBR)	Swansea Bay	V	Mono-27	30 days 14 hours 48 min	
2	Michael Petrovsky (GBR)	Timpani	V	Mono-30	30 days 23 hours 58	
3	David Ryan (USA)	Phagawi	V	Mono-29	31 days 07 hours 48	
4	Albert Fournier (USA)	El Torero	V	Mono-30	31 days 08 hours 25	
5	Jan van Donselaar (NED)	Shamrock	V	Mono-30	32 days 15 hours 20	
6	Alan Armstrong (GBR)	Mitsubishi Electric	V	Mono-29.5	32 days 20 hours 45	
7	Lloyd Hircock (CAN)	Moustache	V	Mono-29.5	35 days 15 hours 57	
8	Vassil Kurtev (BUL)	Nord	V	Mono-25	40 days 16 hours 38	
RET	Bill Wallace (USA)	Novia	Mono-3	V	Dismasted	
RET	Chris Smith (GBR)	Race Against Poverty	Mono-30	V	Damaged	
RET	Douglas Parker (USA)	Refugee	Mono-27	V	Retired	
RET	David Duncombe (GBR)	Go Kart	M 29	V	Damaged	
RET	Geoff Hales (GBR)	Quest for Charity	C 29	V	Damaged	
RET	Henk van de Weg (NED)	Tjisje	Mono-29.5	V	Damaged	
RET	Michael Richey (GBR)	Jester	Mono-26	V	Damaged	
RET	Thomas Veyron (FRA)	Rizla +	Tri-30	V	Dismasted	

=== The CSTAR, 1988 ===
With Carlsberg taking over as main sponsor, the Carlsberg Single-handed Trans-Atlantic Race of 1988 saw 95 entrants, with custom-built multihulls again dominating. Favourable weather made ideal conditions for a fast pace, and indeed Philippe Poupon's winning time set a new race record of 10 days, 9 hours and 10 minutes. One of the main hazards of the race was damage by whales; Mike Birch's Fujicolor was damaged by a whale, forcing him to retire from the race; and David Sellings was forced to abandon Hyccup after she was sunk by an aggressive pod of whales. Mike Richey's original Jester, which had taken part in every edition of the race, was lost in heavy weather in the tail-end of the fleet.

The top eleven finishers were all Class 1 multihulls. The top five were:

Pos.	Skipper	Boat name	Class	Time	Ref.
1	Philippe Poupon (FRA)	Fleury Michon	Tri-60(I)	10 days 09 hours 15 min	
2	Olivier Moussy (FRA)	Laiterie Mt St Michel	Tri-60(I)	11 days 04 hours 17 min	
3	Loïck Peyron (FRA)	Lada Poch II	Tri-60(I)	11 days 09 hours 02 min	
4	Philip Steggall (USA)	Sebago	Tri-60(I)	11 days 09 hours 55 min	
5	Bruno Peyron (FRA)	VSD	Cat-60	12 days 23 hours 20 min	
6	Halvard Mabire (FRA)	Gérard Hénon	Trimaran 60	13 days 06 hours 51 min	
7	Florence Arthaud (FRA)	Groupe Pierre 1er	Trimaran 60	13 days 10 hours 58 min	
8	Jean Maurel (FRA)	Elf Aquitaine III	Trimaran 60	14 days 10 hours 02 min	
9	Tony Bullimor (GBR)	Spirit of Apricot	Trimaran 60	14 days 20 hours 40 min	32 hours 06 min
10	Pierre Sicouri (ITA)	La nuova Sardegna	Trimaran 60	15 days 17 hours 34 min	
11	Pascal Hérold (FRA)	Dupon Duran	Trimaran 60	16 days 12 hours 39 min	
12	Nic Bailey (USA)	MTC	Trimaran 40	16 days 17 hours 03 min	

The fastest monohull, UAP 1992, finished 13th. The top five monohulls:

Pos.	Skipper	Boat	Class	Time
1	Jean-Yves Terlain (FRA)	UAP 1992	Mono-60(I)	17 days 04 hours 05 min
2	John Martin (RSA)	Allied Bank	Mono-60(I)	17 days 08 hours 18 min
3	Jose Ugarte (ESP)	Castrol Solo	Mono-60(I)	17 days 21 hours 47 min
4	Titouan Lamazou (FRA)	Ecureuil d'Aquitaine	Mono-60(I)	18 days 07 hours 00 min
5	Courtney Hazelton (USA)	Mariko	Mono-45(III)	21 days 05 hours 44 min

=== The Europe 1 STAR, 1992 ===
The Europe 1 Star of 1992 saw the fleet beset by a full range of hazards — storms, icebergs, trawlers, fog and whales hit boats on the northern route, before they were finally becalmed off Newfoundland. The monohulls managed the heavy conditions and crosswinds quite well, but the multis were plagued with capsizes and damage. Yves Parlier was the top monohull skipper in a new Open 60, setting a monohull record time of 14 days 16 hours.

The top ten finishers included two monohulls:

Pos.	Skipper	Boat name	Class	Time	Ref.
1	Loïck Peyron (FRA)	Fujicolor	ORMA 60	11 days 01 hours 35 min	
2	Paul vatine (FRA)	Haute-Normandie	ORMA 60	12 days 07 hours 49 min	
3	Francis Joyon (FRA)	Banque Populaire	ORMA 60	12 days 09 hours 14 min	
4	Hervé Laurent (FRA)	Took Took	ORMA 60	13 days 04 hours 01 min	
5	Laurent Bourgnon (SUI)	Primagaz	ORMA 60	13 days 07 hours 40 min	
6	Yves Parlier (FRA)	Cacolac d'Aquitaine	IMOCA 60	14 days 16 hours 01 min	
7	(France) (United States) Etienne Giroire	Up My Sleeve	40 ft Tri	16 days 06 hours 45 min	
8	Mark Gatehouse (GBR)	Queen Anne's Battery	IMOCA 60	16 days 11 hours 30 min	
9	Hervé Cléris (FRA)	C L M	50 ft Tri	16 days 12 hours 17 min	
10	Pascal Hérold (FRA)	Dupon Duran	50 ft Tri	16 days 20 hours 16 min	
11	Alan Wynne-Thomas (GBR)	Cardiff Discovery	IMOCA 60	17 days 06 h 17 min	
12	Bertrand de Broc (FRA)	Groupe LG	IMOCA 60	17 days 07 hours 17 min	
13	Nigel Burgess (GBR)	Dogwatch II	IMOCA 60	17 days 15 hours 59 min	
14	Richard Tolkien (GBR)	Enif Morgan Grenfell	IMOCA 60	17 days 16 hours 40 min	
17	Giovanni Soldini (ITA)	Misco Computer Supplies (Looping)	Open 50	18 days 04 hours 16 min	
19	José de Ugarte (ESP)	Euzkadi Europa 93	IMOCA 60	18 days 07 hours 19 min	
23	Vittorio Malingri (ITA)	Moana 60	IMOCA 60	20 days 10 hours 10 min	

=== The Europe 1 STAR, 1996 ===
Loïck Peyron, on the same trimaran Fujicolor II, for the 1996 edition of the race; and he led at the start, passing the Eddystone lighthouse at 28 knots (52 km/h). However, Francis Joyon dominated the race, and 600 miles (970 km) from the finish seemed set to win, at which point he was 24 hours ahead of his nearest rival; but his trimaran Banque Populaire was capsized by a gust off Nova Scotia, leaving the race to Peyron.

Peyron's time of 10 days, 10 hours and 5 minutes, was just 50 minutes short of the course record. Peyron was the first person to win two successive editions of the race, and only the second to win twice. Gerry Roufs won the monohull division, sailing the 60-foot (18 m) Groupe LG2. Italian Giovanni Soldini won the 50-foot (15 m) monohull class, in Telecom Italia.

Only three multihulls overcame the conditions to make the top ten finishers:

Overall Results
Pos.	Skipper	Class	Type	Boat name	Time	Ref.
Class I
1	Loïck Peyron (FRA)	I	ORMA 60	Fujicolor II	10 days 10 hours 05 min	
2	Paul Vatine (FRA)	I	ORMA 60	Region Haute Normandie	10 days 13 hours 05 min	
3	Mike Birch (CAN)	I	ORMA 60	Biscuits la Trinitaine	14 days 12 hours 55 min	
4	Gerry Roufs (CAN)	I	IMOCA 60	Groupe LG 2	15 days 14 hours 50 min	
5	Josh Hall (GBR)	I	IMOCA 60	Gartmore Investments	16 days 15 hours 56 min	
6	Vittorio Malingri (ITA)	I	IMOCA 60	Anicaflash	16 days 19 hours 24 min	
7	Hervé Laurent (FRA)	I	IMOCA 60	Groupe LG1	17 days 00 hours 55 min	
8	Eric Dumont (FRA)	I	IMOCA 60	Café Legal le Gout	17 days 01 hours 11 min	
9	Catherine Chabaud (FRA)	I	IMOCA 60	Whirlpool-Vital-Europe 2	17 days 06 hours 43 min	
10	Alan Wynne-Thomas (GBR)	I	IMOCA 60	Elan Sifo	18 days 18 hours 14 min	
11	Dirk Gunst (BEL)	I	Mono-57	Tomidi	19 days 19 hours 45 min	
RET	Laurent Bourgnon (FRA)	I	ORMA 60	Primagaz	Capsized	
RET	Francis Joyon (FRA)	I	ORMA 60	Banque Populaire	Capsized	
RET	Yves Parlier (FRA)	I	IMOCA 60	Aquitaine Innovations	Dismasted	
Class II
1	Giovanni Soldini (ITA)	II	IMOCA 50	Telecom Italia	15 days 18 hours 29 min	
2	Pete Goss (FRA)	II	IMOCA 50	Aqua Quorum	17 days 08 hours 08 min	
3	Hervé Cléris (FRA)	II	50 ft Tri	CLM	17 days 10 hours 10 min	
4	Niah Vaughan (GBR)	II	Mono-50	Jimroda II	19 days 22 hours 57 min	
5	Wolfgang Quix (GER)	II	Mono-50	Wolfie's Toy	20 days 01 hours 45 min	
6	Michel André (FRA)	II	Mono-46	Dix de Lyon	24 days 03 hours 47 min	
7	Alain Pelletier (FRA)	II	Mono-48	Oiseau de la Pluie	30 days 09 hours 22 min	
Class III
1	Alan Brutger (GBR)	III	Mono-45	Mountain Sky Magic	19 days 14 hours 22 min	
2	Simone Bianchetti (ITA)	III	Mono-45	Merit Cup	20 days 21 hours 35 min	
3	Phil Rubright (FRA)	III	Mono-44	Shamwari	22 days 13 hours 17 min	
4	Renaud le Youdec (FRA)	III	Mono-40	Kiss Me Quick	27 days 08 hours 00 min	
ABN	Peter Crowther (GBR)	III	Mono-42	Galway Blazer	Sank	
RET	George Stricker (USA)	III	Mono-45	Rapscallion	Retired	
Class IV
1	Trevor Leek (FRA)	IV	40 ft Tri	Mollymawk	17 days 09 hours 44 min	
2	Jacques Bouchacourt (FRA)	IV	Mono-40	New Yorker	20 days 00 hours 23 min	
3	Desmond Hampton (GBR)	IV	Mono-40	Roc	22 days 00 hours 30 min	
4	Neal Petersen (RSA)	IV	Mono-40	Protect our Sealife	25 days 09 hours 33 min	
5	Graham Harrison (GBR)	IV	Mono-38	Cyclone	25 days 19 hours 45 min	
6	David Evans (USA)	IV	Mono-40	Ratso	30 days 00 hours 52 min	
7	Bertus Buys (NED)	IV	Mono-40	Sea Beryl	30 days 04 hours 42 min	
8	Carole Newman (GBR)	IV	Mono-39	Independent Freedom	32 days 02 hours 50 min	
9	Alex Eckhardt (NED)	IV	Mono-36	Taurus	38 days 16 hours 31 min	
RET	Michael Dunkerly (GBR)	IV	Mono-40	Mother Goose	Retired	
RET	Michel Jaheny (FRA)	IV	Mono-40	Chivas 3	Retired	
RET	Jens Als Andersen (DEN)	IV	Mono-40	Fenris	Damaged	
RET	Karl Brinkmann (GER)	IV	Mono-40	Fritzzz	Retired	
Class V
1	Mary Falk (GBR)	V	Mono-35	QII	19 days 22 hours 57 min	
RET	Brian Coad (IRL)	V	Mono-34	Raasay of Melfort	Retired	
RET	Daniel Verger (FRA)	V		Ol'Goud	Dismasted	
RET	Franco Malingri (ITA)	V	Tri-33	Star Trek	Retired	
RET	Johannes van de Wijgerd (NED)	V	Mono-31	Off Course	Retired	
Class VI
1	Michel Kleinjans (BEL)	VI	Mono-30	P M Charles	20 days 14 hours 58 min	
2	David Scully (USA)	VI	Mono-30	Hot Glue Gun	21 days 12 hours 07 min	
3	Fabrizio Tellarini (ITA)	VI	Mono-30	Megaptera	21 days 23 hours 20 min	
4	Franco Manzoli (ITA)	VI	Mono-30	Golfo Tigullio	22 days 01 hours 30 min	
5	Bob Beggs (GBR)	VI	Cat-26	Clarks Active Air	24 days 15 hours 05 min	
6	Ronny Nollet (BEL)	VI	Mono-29.5	Luneborg	25 days 10 hours 05 min	
7	Jacques Crochemore (FRA)	VI	Mono-28	Senseï	27 days 21 hours 59 min	
8	Derek Hatfield (CAN)	VI	Mono-30	Gizmo	28 days 11 hours 20 min	
9	Datcho Datchev (GBR)	VI	Mono-30	Chance	43 days 13 hours 00 min	
10	Mike Richey (GBR)	VI	Mono-25	Jester	56 days 10 hours 54 min	
RET	Gianfranco Tortolani (ITA)	VI	Mono-30	Città di Salerno	Retired	
RET	Herbert Uphues (GER)	VI	Mono-29	Tramp VI	Retired	
RET	Sherman Wright (USA)	VI	Mono-27	Andromeda	Retired	

=== The Europe 1 New Man STAR, 2000 ===
With sponsorship from Europe 1 and New Man, a French sportswear manufacturer, the fortieth anniversary edition of the OSTAR was run under the title Europe 1 New Man STAR.

A surprising total of 24 Open 60 monohulls entered the race; most of these were using the event as a qualifying run for the 2000-2001 Vendée Globe starting later in the year. One of these was the youngest racer in the fleet at age 23, Ellen MacArthur in her new Owen-Clarke designed Open 60 Kingfisher; she beat the big names to become the surprise winner of the monohull division, and the youngest ever winner of the race. The overall winner was Francis Joyon, in his trimaran Eure et Loir.

Pos.	Skipper	Boat	Time	Ref.
ORMA 60 Multihulls
1	Francis Joyon (FRA)	Eure et Loir	9 days 23 hours 21 min	
2	Marc Guillemot (FRA)	Biscuits la Trinitaine	10 days 1 hours 59 min	
3	Franck Cammas (FRA)	Groupama	10 days 2 hours 40 min	
4	Alain Gautier (FRA)	Foncia	10 days 8 hours 37 min	
5	Jean-Luc Nelias (FRA)	Belgacom	10 days 19 hours 35 min	
6	Yvan Bourgnon (SUI)	Bayer en France	16 days 6 hours 21 min	
7	Lalou Roucayrol (FRA)	Banque Populaire	retired - lost a hull	
IMOCA 60 Monohulls
1	Ellen MacArthur (GBR)	Kingfisher	14 days 23 hours 01 min	
2	Roland Jourdain (FRA)	Sill Beurre le Gall	15 days 13 hours 38 min	
3	Mike Golding (GBR)	Team Group 4	15 days 14 hours 50 min	
4	Thierry Dubois (FRA)	Solidaires	15 days 15 hours 33 min	
5	Giovanni Soldini (ITA)	Fila	16 days 04 hours 10 min	
6	Catherine Chabaud (FRA)	Whirlpool	16 days 10 hours 19 min	
7	Michel Desjoyeaux (FRA)	PRB	16 days 15 hours 51 min	
8	Marc Thiercelin (FRA)	Active Wear	17 days 15 hours 44 min	
9	Dominique Wavre (SUI)	Union Bancaire Privee	17 days 17 hours 02 min	
10	Joe Seeten (FRA)	Nord Pas de Calais	18 days 02 hours 22 min	
11	Xavier Lecoeur (FRA)	GEB	19 days 13 hours 03 hours min	
12	Didier Munduteguy (FRA)	DDP 60me Sud	21 days 07 hours 18 min	
13	Patrick Favre (FRA)	Adrenalines	31 days 05 hours 19 min	
DNF	Yves Parlier (FRA)	Aquitaine Innovations	retired - dismasted	
DNF	Thomas Coville (FRA)	Sodebo Savourons la Vie	retired - dismasted	
DNF	Eric Dumont (FRA)	Services Euroka	retired - dismasted	
DNF	Dirk Gunst (BEL)	Tomidi	retired - autopilot failure	
DNF	Richard Tolkien (GBR)	This Time	retired - sail damage	
DNF	Bruce Burgess (GBR)	Hawaiian Express	retired for personal reasons	

=== Faraday Mill OSTAR 2005 ===
The 2005 event was the first held for smaller boats, again under the name OSTAR, sponsored by Faraday Mill.

35 boats took part with 16 forced to retire. Franco Manzoli won the race in Cotonella, taking 17 days and 21 hours to finish. The 2005 race featured the first single-handed, trans-atlantic crossing by a profoundly deaf person: Gerry Hughes.

Skipper	Boat	Time
Trimarans
(Italy) Franco Manzoli	Cotonella	17 days 21 hours 41 min
(France) Roger Langevin	Branec IV	18 days 06 hours 7 min
(France) Pierre Antoine	Spirit	18 days 08 hours 43 min
(Netherlands) Leon Bart	Houd van Hout	25 days 16 hours 45 min
(United Kingdom) Aurelia Ditton	Shockwave	27 days 09 hours 19 min
(France) Anne Caseneuve	Acanthe Ingénierie	retired - injured knee
(France) (United States) Etienne Giroire	Up My Sleeve	retired
(United Kingdom) Ross Hobson	Mollymawk	retired - broken daggerboard
Monohulls
(United Kingdom) Steve White	Olympian Challenger	20 days 05 hours 24 min
(Canada) Yves Lepine	Atlantix Express	21 days 04 hours 40 min
(Netherlands) Nico Budel	Hayai	21 days 18 hours 17 min
(United States) Philip Rubright	Echo Zulu	23 days 22 hours 50 min
(France) Lionel Regnier	Trois Mille Sabords	25 days 23 hours 48 min
(United Kingdom) Mervyn Wheatley	Tamarind	26 days 02 hours 48 min
(United Kingdom) Peter Keig	Zeal	27 days 11 hours 31 min
(United Kingdom) Stephen Gratton	Amelie of Dart	30 days 4 hours 32 min
(United Kingdom) Richard Hatton	Chimp	30 days 18 hours 7 min
(Netherlands) Huib Swets	Vijaya	32 days 5 hours 4 min
(United Kingdom) Gerry Hughes	Quest II	34 days 4 hours 15 min
(United Kingdom) Paul Heiney	Ayesha of St Mawes	35 days 14 hours 19 min
(Netherlands) Groot Cees	Reality	41 days 16 hours 15 min
(United Kingdom) Tony Waldeck	Adrienne May	retired - broken mainsail luff cars
(France) Michel Jaheny	Chivas III	retired
Patrice Carpentier (FRA)	VM Materiaux	retired
(Netherlands) Bart Boosman	De Franschman	retired - broken shroud
Hannah White (GBR)	Spirit of Canada	retired - broken autopilot
(United Kingdom) Peter Crowther	Suomi Kudu	retired - broken forestay
(Belgium) Michel Kleinjans	Roaring Forty	retired - bulkhead problems
(Netherlands) Pieter Adriaans	Robosail	retired - boom, vang problems
(Belgium) Ronny Nollet	La Promesse	retired - previous back injury
(France) Pierre Chatelin	Destination Calais	retired - problems with boat
(Netherlands) Bertus Buys	Sea Beryl	retired - mainsail damage
(Netherlands) Bram Van De Loosdrecht	Octavus	retired - dismasted
(France) Jacques Dewez	Blue Shadow	retired - damaged at start

=== OSTAR 2009 ===
The 2009 OSTAR started on 25 May 2009. The skipper's blogs were published on www.blogstar.org.uk

Skipper	Boat	Elapsed Time
(Netherlands) JanKees Lampe	La Promesse	17 days 17 hours 40 min
(United Kingdom) Rob Craigie	Jbellino	19 days 00 hours 10 min
(Italy) Roberto Westerman	Spinning Wheel	19 days 03 hours 14 min
(United Kingdom) Hannah White	Pure Solo	20 days 00 hours 22 min
(Republic of Ireland) Barry Hurley	Dinah	20 days 22 hours 35 min
(Italy) Luca Zoccoli	In Direzione Ostinata e Contraria	20 days 22 hours 39 min
(United Kingdom) Jerry Freeman	QII	21 days 02 hours 49 min
(United Kingdom) Oscar Mead	King of Shaves	21 days 12 hours 24 min
(United Kingdom) Katie Miller	BluQube	21 days 18 hours 53 min
(Germany) Uwe Rottgering	Fanfan!	21 days 22 hours 42 min
(Italy) Marco Nannini	British Beagle	21 days 23 hours 44 min
(Netherlands) Huib Swets	Vijaya	22 days 03 hours 41 min
(Netherlands) Dick Koopmans	Jager	22 days 04 hours 35 min
(Netherlands) Bard Boosman	De Franschman	22 days 21 hours 04 min
(United Kingdom) Will Sayer	Elmarleen	23 days 01 hours 30 min
(United Kingdom) Pip Hildesley	Cazenove Capital	23 days 14 hours 05 min
(France) Christian Chalandre	Olbia	24 days 09 hours 06 min
(United Kingdom) John Falla	Banjaard	24 days 20 hours 55 min
(United Kingdom) Michael Collins	Flamingo Lady	27 days 05 hours 31 min
(United Kingdom) Andrew Petty	Jemima Nicholas	28 days 15 hours 57 min
(United Kingdom) Peter Crowther	Suomi Kudu	29 days 02 hours 15 min
(United States) Peter Bourke	Rubicon	39 days 07 hours 56 min
(United Kingdom) Geoff Alcorn	Wind of Lorne II	over time limit
(United Kingdom) Mervyn Wheatley	Tamarin	retired
(France) Jacques Bouchacourt	Okami	retired
(United Kingdom) Rob Cumming	Egotripp	retired
(Italy) Gianfranco Tortolani	Città di Salerno	retired
(United Kingdom) Paul Brant	Ninjod	retired
(United Kingdom) Jonathan Snodgrass	Lexia	retired
(France) Anne Caseneuve	Croisières Anne Caseneuve	retired
(Austria) Reini Gelder	Light For The World	retired

=== OSTAR 2013 ===
The 2013 OSTAR started on 27 May 2013.

Results
Skipper	Boat	Time Elapsed	Time Corrected
Multihull Class
(France) Roger Langevin	Branec VI	18 days 05 hours 49 min	25 days 19 hours 31 min
(Poland) Joanna Pajkowska	Cabrio 2	27 days 23 hours 53 min	28 days 20 hours 02 min
Gypsy Moth Class
(United Kingdom) Richard Lett	Pathway to Children	22 days 06 hours 13 min	22 days 22 hours 47 min
(Italy) Andrea Mura	Vento Di Sardegna	17 days 11 hours 12 min	23 days 09 hours 19 min
(Netherlands) Jac Sandberg	Spirit	22 days 21 hours 10 min	24 days 06 hours 07 min
(Netherlands) Nico Budel	sec. Hayai	21 days 17 hours 02 min	27 days 00 hours 10 min
(Switzerland) Ralph Villiger	Ntombifuti	36 days 08 hours 12 min	37 days 12 hours 59 min
Jester Class
(United States) Jonathan Green	Jeroboam	23 days 07 hours 16 min	22 days 04 hours 25 min
(United Kingdom) Charles Emmett	British Beagle	28 days 01 hours 30 min	26 days 05 hours 03 min
(Poland) Krystian Szypka	Sunrise	28 days 13 hours 30 min	27 days 21 hours 44 min
(United Kingdom) Mervyn Wheatley	Tamarind	30 days 04 hours 59 min	28 days 02 hours 14 min
(United Kingdom) Pether Crowther	Suomi Kudu	30 days 14 hours 13 min	28 days 19 hours 38 min
Eira Class
(United Kingdom) Geoff Alcorn	Wind of Lorne II	58 days 08 hours 20 min	50 days 00 hours 05 min

=== OSTAR 2017 ===
The 2017 OSTAR started on 29 May 2017.

Results
SKIPPER	YACHT	TYPE / LOA . CLASS	H/CAP	ELAPSED TIME	CORRECTED TIME	Pos.
Conor Fogerty (IRL)	Bam	M 36 GM	1.037	21 days 02 hours 45 min	21 days 21 hours 30 min	1
Andrea Mura (ITA)	Vento di Sardegna	M 50 GM	1.411	17 days 04 hours 06 min	24 days 05 hours 28 min	2
Mark Hipgrave (AUS)	Mister Lucky	M 36 GM	1.036	24 days 17 hours 20 min	25 days 14 hours 42 min	3
Christian Chalandre (FRA)	Olbia	M 34 J	0.896	32 days 14 hours 09 min	29 days 04 hours 49 min	4
Neil Payter (GBR)	Solent I	M 33 J	0.904	35 days 05 hours 09 min	31 days 20 hours 01 min	5
Christophe Dietsch (FRA)	Breizh Cola	M 35		Retired		
Keith Walton (GBR)	Harmonii	M 49 GM	1.022	Retired		
Michele Zambelli (ITA)	Illumia 12	M 31 GM	1.096	Abandon		
Lionel Regnier (FRA)	One And All	M 36		Retired		
Andrzej Kopytko (POL)	Opole	M 37 J	0.961	Retired		
David Southwood (GBR)	Summerbird	M 40 J	0.913	Retired		
Peter Crowther (GBR)	Suomi Kudu	M 38 J	0.945	Retired		
Mervyn Wheatley (GBR)	Tamarind	M 42 J	0.940	Sank		
Ricardo Diniz (POR)	Taylor 325	M 60 GM	1.362	Retired		
Kass Schmitt (USA)	Zest	M 36 J	0.996	Retired		

=== OSTAR 2022 ===
The 60th anniversary of the OSTAR was originally planned to start on 10 May 2020, but was twice postponed due to the global pandemic. The renamed 2022 OSTAR started on 15 May 2022.

Results
SKIPPER	YACHT	TYPE / LOA . CLASS	H/CAP	ELAPSED TIME	CORRECTED TIME	Pos.
Markus Moser (SWI)	Lifgun	M 50 GM	1.131	21 days 06 hours 0 min	24 days 0 hours 49 min	1
James Mansell (GBR)	Escape	M 39 GM	0.968	26 days 04 hours 10 min	25 days 08 hours 04 min	2
Herve Dupriez (FRA)	Polynya	M 36 J	0.896	29 days 22 hours 47 min	26 days 20 hours 01 min	3
Mihail Kopanov (BUL)	Krone One	M 39 GM	1.059	Retired		
Neil Payter (GBR)	Cariberia	M 40 GM	1.220	Retired		
Jacek Chabowlski (POL)	Blue Horizon	M 47 GM	0.993	Retired		
Tomasz Ladyko (POL)	Oddesy	M 35 J	0.941	Retired		
