= Acapella (trimaran) =

- Other names: Olympus Photo
- Designer(s): Walter Greene
- Launched: 1978

Racing career
- Skippers: Mike Birch
- Notable victories: 1978 Route du Rhum

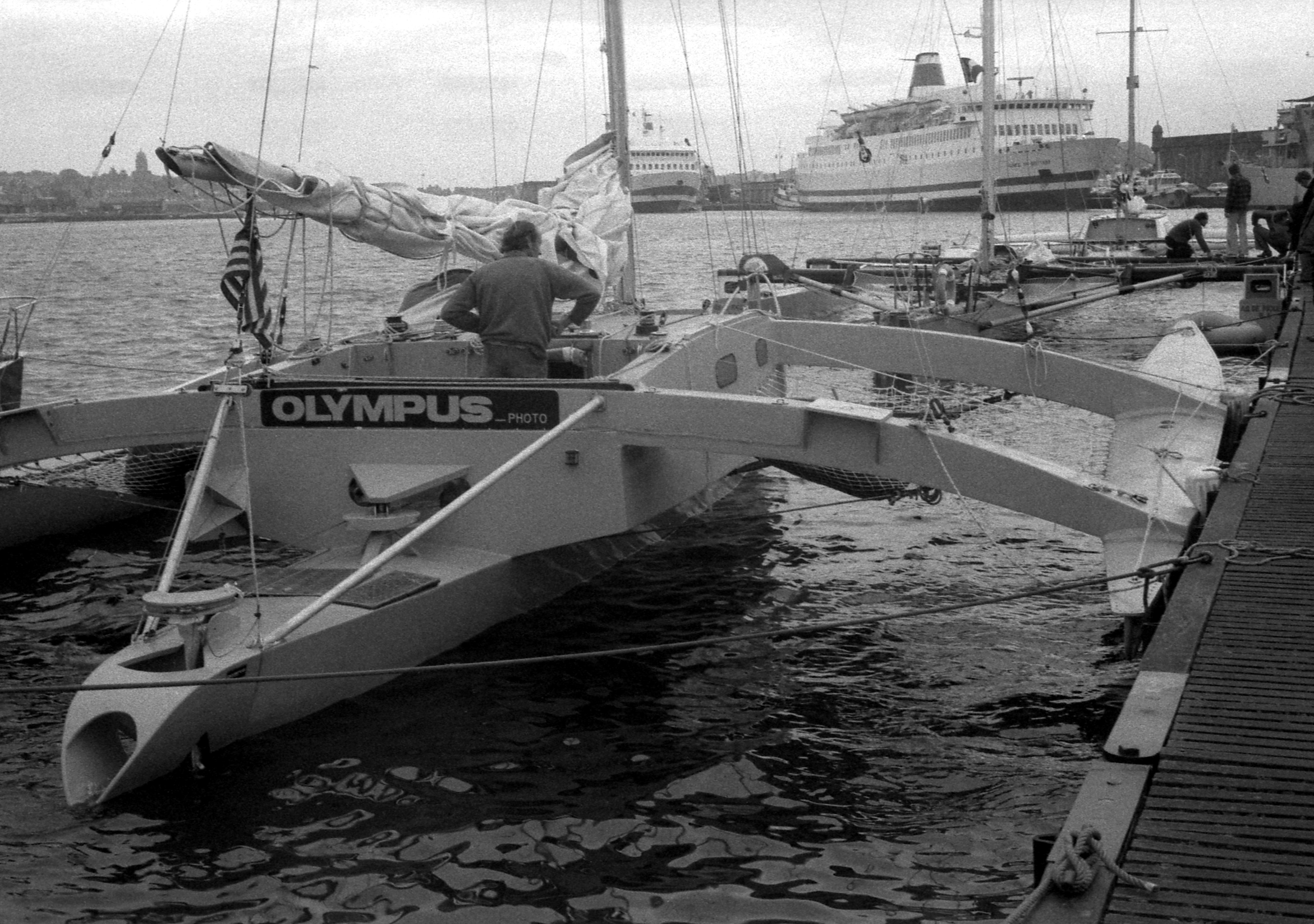

Acapella is a historic trimaran sailboat, designed and built by Walter Greene in 1978 and later renamed Olympus Photo.

Walter and his wife Joan raced in the 1978 Round Britain race, coming in 1st in class and 4th overall. Later that year, Canadian Mike Birch sailed Acapella (renamed Olympus Photo) to a first-place win in the first Route du Rhum trans-Atlantic race, establishing Walter's reputation as a multihull designer.

== See also ==
- List of multihulls
- Mike Birch
- OSTAR
- Route du Rhum
- Walter Greene
