= Newick (disambiguation) =

Newick is a village in East Sussex, England.

Newick may also refer to:

- Newick format, or Newick notation, a way to represent graph-theoretical trees named for a restaurant where it was devised
- Richard Cooper Newick, known as Dick Newick, (1926–2013), a multihull sailboat designer
