= Michael Richey =

English sailor, navigator and author

- Born: Michael William Dugdale Mills Richey; 6 July 1917; Eastbourne, East Sussex
- Died: 22 December 2009 (aged 92); Brighton, East Sussex, England
- Other name: Mike Richey
- Occupations: Navigator, director of the Royal Institute of Navigation (1947–1982)
- Known for: Oldest sailor to cross the Atlantic single-handed

Michael William Dugdale Mills Richey MBE (6 July 1917 – 22 December 2009) was an English sailor and navigator and an author and editor of books and journals about navigation. His first publication, an article about his experiences in a shipwreck, was awarded the first John Llewellyn Rhys Prize in 1942.

Richey was known as a passionate sailor and regular participant at the Observer Single-handed Trans-Atlantic Race (OSTAR) organised every four years by the Royal Western Yacht Club of England. He started in each of these races between 1968 and 1996 with his small yacht, Jester. Finishing his last competition in 1996 at the age of 80, he achieved an entry in the Guinness Book of World Records as the oldest man to cross the Atlantic as a solo sailor.

== Life ==
Michael Richey was born in Eastbourne, East Sussex, in 1917 as the second son of George and Adelaide Richey, one year after his brother Paul (1916–1989). After leaving school in 1935 at Downside School, a Catholic boarding school of the Benedictine Downside Abbey, Richey first planned to become a monk. Richey indeed spent a short time at the Trappist monastery on Caldey Island but did not pursue this intention. Instead, the following three years he lived and worked in the Catholic artist's community of the sculptor Eric Gill at Speen near High Wycombe.

At the outbreak of World War II, Richey volunteered, despite his pacifist stance, for military service in the Royal Navy. Richey first served on a minesweeper of the Royal Naval Patrol Service, HMS Goodwill. After the sinking of the ship because of a bombardment by German torpedoes, Richey processed the existential experience of life risk in a short story entitled "Sunk by a Mine, a Survivor's Story". The war censorship in Britain prohibited the publication of this narrative, but it was published in the magazine of The New York Times in 1941, and from there it moved back to the UK, where in 1942 this story was awarded the first John Llewellyn Rhys Prize for young writers. Any literary appreciation for Richey, however, did not materialize, and he himself had no literary ambitions later. Only to celebrate his 80th birthday in 1997 was another literary work by Richey, entitled "A taste of the Antarctic", published and privately printed by Nicholas Scheetz. These are travel records Richey wrote in 1943 as navigation assistant on the auxiliary cruiser MV Carnarvon Castle on a ride in the South Atlantic.

In further missions on various ships of the British Navy and the Free French Naval Forces Richey increasingly acquired experience as a navigator, and finally completed a training as navigation specialist at the Royal Navy's Maritime Warfare School HMS Dryad. After the war he established the newly created Royal Institute of Navigation (RIN) in London, which he served as managing director (initially entitled "Chief Secretary", later "Director") from 1947 up to the end of his professional career in 1982. In 1948 Richey founded the Journal of Navigation, which he headed as editor until 1985 and in which appeared most of his own articles on navigation.

Richey died of a heart attack at his home in Brighton, East Sussex, at the age of 92.

== Sailing ==
After 1948 Richey started sailing races, initially as a navigator on the boats of others. In 1964 he acquired a small junk rigged boat, a converted Nordic Folkboat named Jester from Herbert "Blondie" Hasler, the co-founder of the OSTAR competition. With this boat, Richey henceforth "succeeded" in an unusual manner as a solo sailor. The previous owner, Hasler, had already participated with Jester on the first two OSTAR races in 1960 and 1964 from Plymouth in southern England to the eastern coast of the United States, still with the intention of winning the race.

Richey continued these trips, even if he—not participating in the increasing mechanization and professionalisation of the sport – never had a chance to win the OSTAR race. On the contrary, he failed on the way (three of his eight Regatta participations) or he reached the destination at Newport, Rhode Island several weeks later than the winning boat, being the last or second last of the starting field. However, by Richey's Atlantic crossings Jester became "something of a national sailing symbol in Britain".

Two problematic accidents could not keep him away from participating in the OSTAR race. On the return journey from the US coast in 1986, Richey came into a heavy storm, but was saved along with the boat. In the following OSTAR Regatta 1988, Jester was so badly damaged in a storm that Richey finally had to abandon the boat. He commented on the loss as follows: "For me, it was an occasion of immeasurable sadness, which I found great difficulty getting over".

Richey's friends subsequently collected money in order to provide a replica true to the original, and with this new Jester he took part in the following two races in 1992 and in 1996, finishing again as the last participant within the time limit. After his last arrival in England – on the way back in 1997 Richey celebrated his 80th birthday – he still had an achievement to celebrate with Jester, gaining a certificate of entry in the Guinness Book of World Records as the oldest man to cross the Atlantic alone in a boat.

Richey participated at the OSTAR regattas in unbroken succession from 1968 to 1996. In eight appearances with his small yacht Jester, he is still (as of 2016) the sailor with the second most competition participations. A single other sailor surpassed him: Peter Crowther participated in 2013 for the ninth time and thus became the sole record holder.

=== Placements in the OSTAR regattas, 1968–1996 ===
Richey's rankings: eight OSTAR participations with Jester:

- 1968: 18th place – 18 of 35 participants started in Plymouth and reached the port of destination in Newport
- 1972: 39th place – 40 of 55 participants reached the destination in time (furthermore, 3 boats were outside the time limit)
- 1976: Retiring from race after start, instead Trip to Ireland – 73 of 125 participants reached the destination in time (furthermore 5 boats outside time limit)
- 1980: Unranked, arrival at destination outside time limit – 72 of 90 participants reached the destination in time (furthermore, 2 boats were outside the time limit)
- 1984: Retiring from the race at Halifax after damage to the sail – 64 of 91 participants reached the destination in time
- 1988: Retiring from the race, loss of Jester in rough weather – 73 of 95 participants reached the destination in time
- 1992: 54th place – 54 of 76 participants reached the destination in time
- 1996: 42nd place – 42 of 53 participants reached the destination in time

== Awards ==
- 1942 – John Llewellyn Rhys Prize for "Sunk by a Mine. A Survivor's Story."
- 1979 – Gold Medal of the Royal Institute of Navigation
- 1986 – Seamanship Medal of the Royal Cruising Club
- 1993 – Award of Merit of the Ocean Cruising Club'
- 2000 – Appointed Honorary Fellow of the Institute of Navigation (ION)
- 2003 – Necho Award of the International Association of Institutes of Navigation (IAIN)

== Publications ==
- Sunk by a Mine. A Survivor's Story. The New York Times, Section Magazine, Page SM5, 11 May 1941
  - Reprinted by the Australian weekly The Western Mail (Perth), 28 August 1941, p 3 and p 71 (digitised at the National Library of Australia; retrieved 28 October 2018.)
- with E. G. R. Taylor: The Geometrical Seaman. A book of early nautical instruments. Hollis & Carter, London 1962
- as editor: The Shell Encyclopedia of Sailing. Stanford Maritime, London 1980, ISBN 978-0-54007-193-7
  - also as: The Sailing Encyclopedia. Lippincott & Crowell, New York 1980, ISBN 978-0-69001-922-3
- A taste of the Antarctic. Introduction by Libby Purves. Yonno Press, Williamston NC 1997 (travel records from 1943, privately printed, ordered by Nicholas Scheetz on the occasion of Richey's 80th, an edition of 80 copies)

Richey regularly had articles published in the Journal of Navigation about sailing experiences with Jester; the following article on his serious accident in 1986 may stand as an example:

- Jester’s ultimate Storm, Journal of Navigation 40/02, May 1987, pp 149–157, doi:10.1017/S0373463300000394. Published online at jesterinfo.org:.
