= Richard Cooper Newick =

Richard "Dick" Newick (May 9, 1926 in Hackensack, New Jersey – August 28, 2013 in Sebastopol, California) — more frequently known as Dick Newick — was a multihull sailboat designer.

He grew up in Rutherford, New Jersey. At 10 he built two kayaks with his father and brother. At 12 he designed and built two more by himself. At 14 he sold kayak plans to a schoolmate for $5. After school he spent some time in the United States Navy and earned a degree from the University of California, Berkeley. He ran a boat shop, worked charitably with Quakers in Mexico, then explored Europe by kayak. He sailed to St. Croix in the United States Virgin Islands where he met and married his wife Patricia Ann Moe. They lived in Martha's Vineyard, Massachusetts and Kittery Point, Maine and had two daughters, Lark Blair and Valery Wright, both of whom have boat designs named after them.

He believed in reincarnation, and said he had been a Polynesian boat builder in a previous life. He lauded simplicity of design, safe seagoing performance, aesthetics, and speed under sail.

Newick was at the forefront of the 1960s revival of multihulls, helping to reform their aesthetic and influencing later designs such as the AC72. He was inducted into the North American Boat Designers Hall of Fame in 2008.

== Designs ==
Design	Type	Year	Length	Notes
Argonauta	trimaran		27	folding trimaran
Ay-Ay	catamaran		40	
Cheers	proa	1968	40	Atlantic proa, 1968 OSTAR, third place
Creative	trimaran		42	
Echo II	trimaran		36	
Eterna	proa	1980	54	Atlantic proa, 1980 OSTAR entrant
Godiva	proa	1980	34	Atlantic proa, 1980 OSTAR entrant
Gulf Streamer	trimaran		60	built for Phil Weld
Lark	trimaran	1962	24	named for Newick's daughter
Lucky Strike	trimaran		50	racing design
Maine Cat 22	catamaran		24	18 examples built
Moxie	trimaran		46	1980 OSTAR winner, built for Phil Weld
Native	trimaran	1976	38	
Ocean Surfer	trimaran	1988	40	1988 CSTAR entrant
Pat's	trimaran		50	Newick's personal cruiser. Named for Newick's wife.
proa	proa	1974	34	Pacific proa
Quick Silver	trimaran		40	
Rev	trimaran		16	Newick's personal daysailer. Crab claw rig
Rogue Wave	trimaran		60	built for Phil Weld
Rusty Pelican	trimaran	1983	45	
Somersault 26	trimaran		26	
Spark	trimaran		28	yawl rig
Three Cheers	trimaran	1976	46	wing deck. Yawl rig. 1972 OSTAR, 5th place.
Traveler	trimaran		51	
Tremolino	trimaran		23	
Trice	trimaran		36	sloop rig
Tricia	trimaran		36	
Trine	trimaran		32	Newick's first trimaran design. Sloop rig.
Tryst	trimaran		36	
Vaka Fanaua	trimaran		50	"island freighter" trimaran
Val	trimaran	1976	31	Named for Newick's daughter. 1976 OSTAR as "The Third Turtle"
Val 1	trimaran		31	wing-deck
Val 2	trimaran		31	
White Wings	trimaran		36	yawl rig

== See also ==
- Multihull
- Nathanael Greene Herreshoff
- Proa
- Trimaran
