= Royal Marine VSV =

Very Slender Vessel in British service

Class overview
- Builders: Halmatic Ltd
- Operators: Royal Marines
- Built: 2002?

General characteristics
- Type: VSV
- Displacement: 7.25 long tons (7.37 t) (16m variant); 19.75 long tons (20.07 t) (22m variant)
- Length: 52.5 feet (16.0 m) (16m variant); 75 feet (23 m) (22m variant)
- Beam: 9.25 feet (2.82 m) (16m variant); 14.25 feet (4.34 m) (22m variant)
- Draught: 3.25 feet (0.99 m) (16m variant); 3.75 feet (1.14 m) (22m variant)
- Propulsion: Twin 660/750 bhp diesel (16m variant); Twin 1,000/2,000 bhp diesel (22m variant)
- Speed: 60 knots (110 km/h; 69 mph)+ (both variants)
- Range: 3,000 litres (660 imp gal; 790 US gal) (16m variant); 3,000 litres (660 imp gal; 790 US gal)+ (22m variant)
- Troops: Space for some troops
- Complement: Up to three
- Armament: GPMGs, 20mm cannon
- Notes: Air portable

The Royal Marine VSV is a Very Slender Vessel in British service.

A small number of the craft were built for service with the Royal Marines and Special Boat Service. They were built in two versions, known as the VSV 16m 145 class and the follow-up version, the VSV 22m.
