= Hannah White =

British sailor and broadcaster

- Born: Hannah Elizabeth Gwillim White; 30 March 1983 (age 43); Reading, Berkshire, England
- Occupations: Broadcaster, Sailor and Adventurer
- Website: Official Website

Hannah Elizabeth Gwillim White (born 30 March 1983, Berkshire, England) is a broadcaster, sailor, and adventurer. She is the Guinness World Records holder for fastest person to cross the English Channel, and had made a television programme, Go Hard or Go Home.

== Personal life ==
The younger of two children, White grew up in Newbury, Berkshire and was educated at the Godolphin School in Salisbury. Having married a Suffolk farmer, she now lives in Suffolk with him and they have a daughter together.

== Career ==
=== Sailing ===
Having been introduced to sailing at the age of 15 by the family of one of her school friends, White's first Cowes Week was frustrating with her feeling as a novice that she was "always getting in the way and in the wrong place". However, this was her first step on her sailing career. She finished second place in the solo trans-Atlantic race, the OSTAR, in 2009. A 3200 nm race following the historical North Atlantic route from Plymouth, UK to Newport, USA she completed the race in 20days 22mins, missing out on the under 35-foot world record by a few minutes but being awarded the media award for the OSTAR, voted for by the public. In total, White made two solo attempts to cross the Atlantic between 2005 (in this year as the youngest ever female competitor) and 2009, one of which was successful.

In 2015, she became the new Guinness World Records holder for the fastest crossing of the English Channel in a single-handed dinghy by doing so in 3 hours, 44 minutes and 39 seconds.

== Broadcasting ==
=== Sailing ===
During her professional racing career, White featured heavily in the local press, frequently working for BBC local radio and ITV Meridian, covering maritime and sailing events.

In 2010, White was part of the commentary team for the Olympic test event, Sail for Gold in Weymouth. In 2011, White became the lead presenter for the World Match Racing Tour, broadcasting to over 180 countries worldwide. The live coverage for Monsoon Cup in Malaysia was nominated for a National RTS Award for best live event.

At the end of 2011, White joined the Volvo Ocean Race as Master of Ceremonies and Presenter. Commentating on racing, and MC’ing prize givings, race days arrival and departure ceremonies to 2.9 million people around the world. Average live audiences on In-Port race days were 43,882.

White was co-presenter and commentator for the Sailing Venue, Weymouth at the London 2012 Olympic Games.

=== Go Hard or Go Home ===
Aired in January 2014, Go Hard or Go Home was produced by Channel 5 and focused on people whom White chose to train for athletic challenges.
