= Nick Keig =

Manx yachtsman and businessman (born 1936)

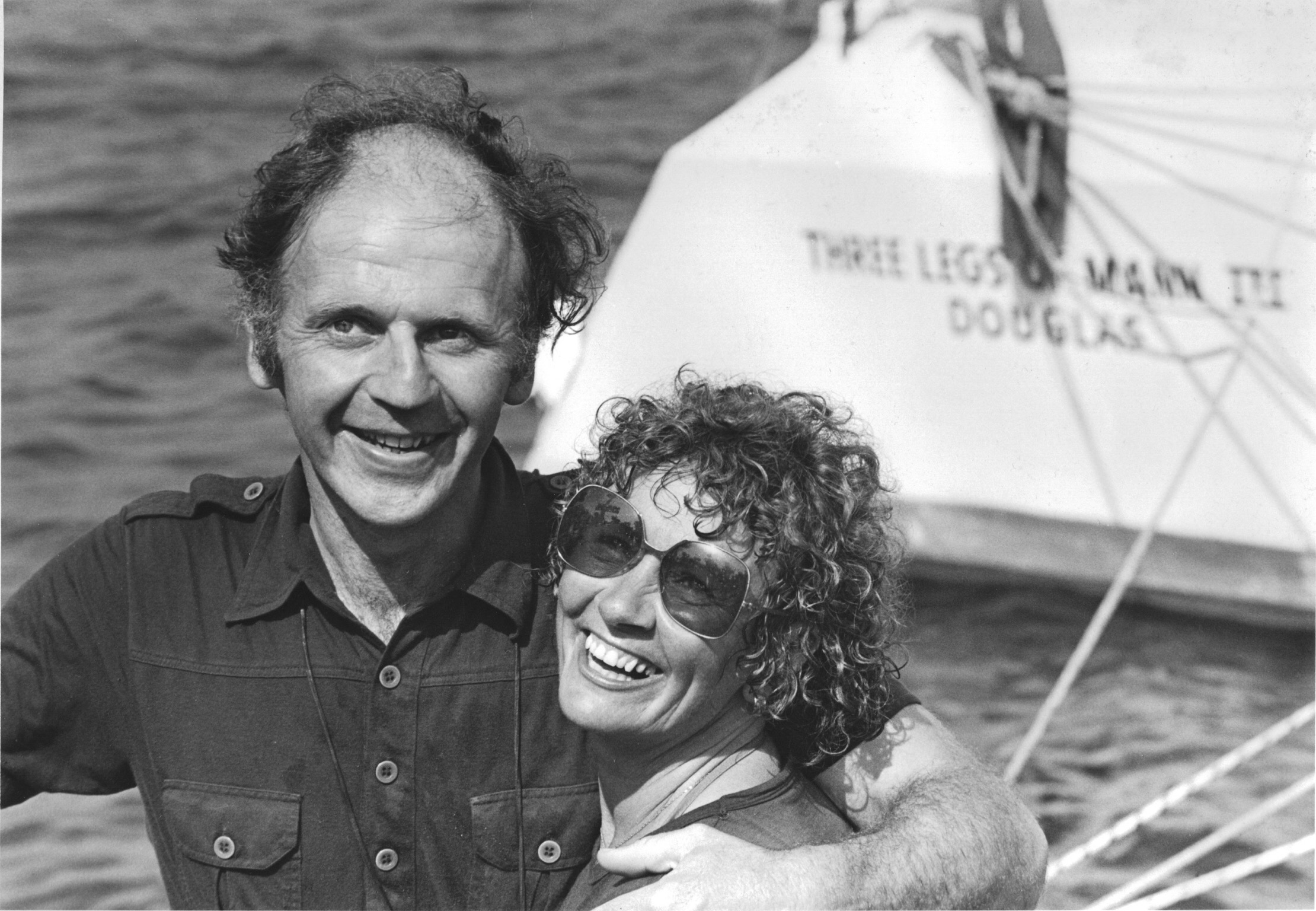
- Nick Keig, alongside his late wife, in front of sailing yacht 'Legs of Man III'.
- Occupation: Retired Businessman
- Known for: Yacht Racing
- Spouse: Maureen Elizabeth Keig (nee Brown) 1937 - 2019
- Children: Janette Packard; Paul Keig 1964 - 1987; Timothy Keig; Rachel Bajard
- Parent(s): Youngest child of Stanley and Erinee Keig (nee Trustrum)
- Family: Great Grandfather: Thomas Keig, first Mayor of Douglas, astronomer.

John Nicholas Keig (born 13 June 1936) is a yachtsman, inventor, and explorer. He was born and lives on the Isle of Man. He took over his family business, S.R. Keig Ltd, in 1952. The company was the oldest family run photography business in the world until its closure in 2010. Nick Keig is best known for his yacht racing successes in the 1970’s. He is also known for being one half of the team that designed and built the VSV (Very Slender Vessel) in the 1990’s.

== Yacht racing ==
=== Three Legs I ===
Three Legs I, a 37.6 foot Trimaran was launched 1973. It featured one of the world's earliest onboard computers, designed to measure the angle between True Wind and Apparent Wind. In 1974, it won the BP Crystal Trophy, a significant multihull event in Europe at that time.

=== Three Legs II ===
Three Legs II, a 52-foot trimaran, was launched in 1977. In the same year, it won the Round the Island Race, a 50-nautical mile course starting and ending in Cowes. It also secured victory in the Azores Race. In 1978, Three Legs II won both the Round the Island Race and the Azores Race. Furthermore, it achieved second place overall and emerged as the winner in the 35' and under class in the Observer Two-Handed Round Britain and Ireland Race.

=== Three Legs III ===
Three Legs III, a 53-foot trimaran, was launched in 1979. In the same year, it won the Round the Island Race. In 1980, Three Legs III finished as the runner-up in the Observer Single-Handed Transatlantic Race from Plymouth to Newport Rhode Island, completing the race in 18 days, 6 hours, and 4 minutes.

=== VSD ===
VSD. a 75-foot catamaran, was launched 1983. It was sponsored by the French newspaper "Vendredi, Samedi, Dimanche" (VSD) for the Transat en Double Race from Lorient to Bermuda. However, the boat was demasted two days into the race and could not continue.

== Yacht building and design ==
Over the span of fourteen years architect Derek Kelsall developed Nick Keig’s ideas into five consecutive multihulls. Legs of Mann III, VSD and Legs of Mann IV were built using a new technique that Derek Kelsall was developing at the time: GRP foam sandwich, a technique where a closed cell foam was sandwiched between two light skins of fibreglass, resulting in a very light and strong hull.

=== Very Slender Vessel (VSV) ===
The revolutionary mono-hull wave piercer was designed by Adrian Thompson and Nick Keig in 1986. It was designed to reduce the slamming effect and move through waves more efficiently, therefore increasing speed and efficiency. The original 30-foot prototype was built on the Isle of Man and tested extensively by Nick Keig in the Irish Sea.

The duo formed Paragon Mann Limited and went on to build the first full scale VSV which successfully reduced G Force from up to 20G to around 4G. This enabled longer travelling distances, increased comfort and less physical damage to crew. These attributes quickly caught the attention of elite military forces from around the world.

The project outgrew its innovators and Paragon Mann was unable to stop the design from being plagiarised by organisations with much bigger budgets. The VSV has since been developed by several users around the world into almost identical versions of the original design, including Multimarine Limited’s VSV Mary Slim.

== Awards and honours ==
Nick Keig entered the Guinness Book of Records in 1975 for Greatest Distance Covered Under Sail in 24 Hours. 360 miles, noon to noon. In 1983, the cumulation of Nick Keig’s yachting achievements earned him the honour of being the only living Manxman to have his head pictured on a set of Isle of Man postage stamps and he has been President of Peel Lifeboat since 1989.
