= Moxie (trimaran) =

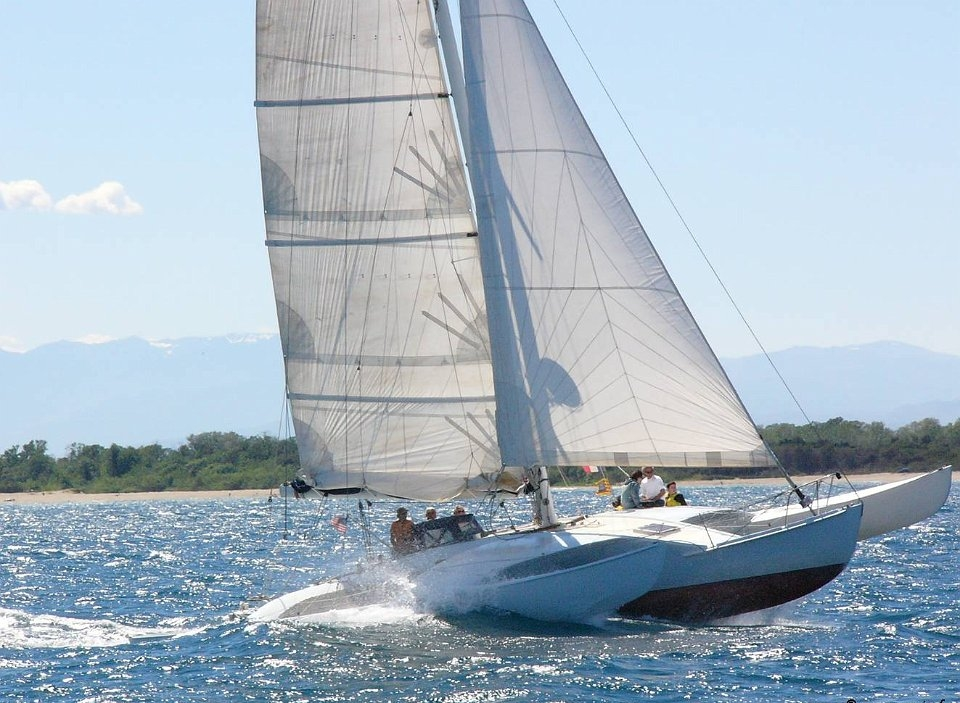

Moxie is a historic trimaran sailboat. It was custom designed by Dick Newick and built by Walter Greene to the 46 ft (14 m) OSTAR race waterline length limit at Handy Boat, Cousins River, Yarmouth, Maine. It was launched in 1980.

Skippered by Philip Weld, Moxie won the Observer Single-Handed Trans-Atlantic Race (OSTAR) that year.

On 7 October 2022, Moxie is qualified to participate to the Route du Rhum 2022 skippered by Thomas Lurton.

== See also ==
- List of multihulls
