= Vittorio Malingri =

Italian boat designer

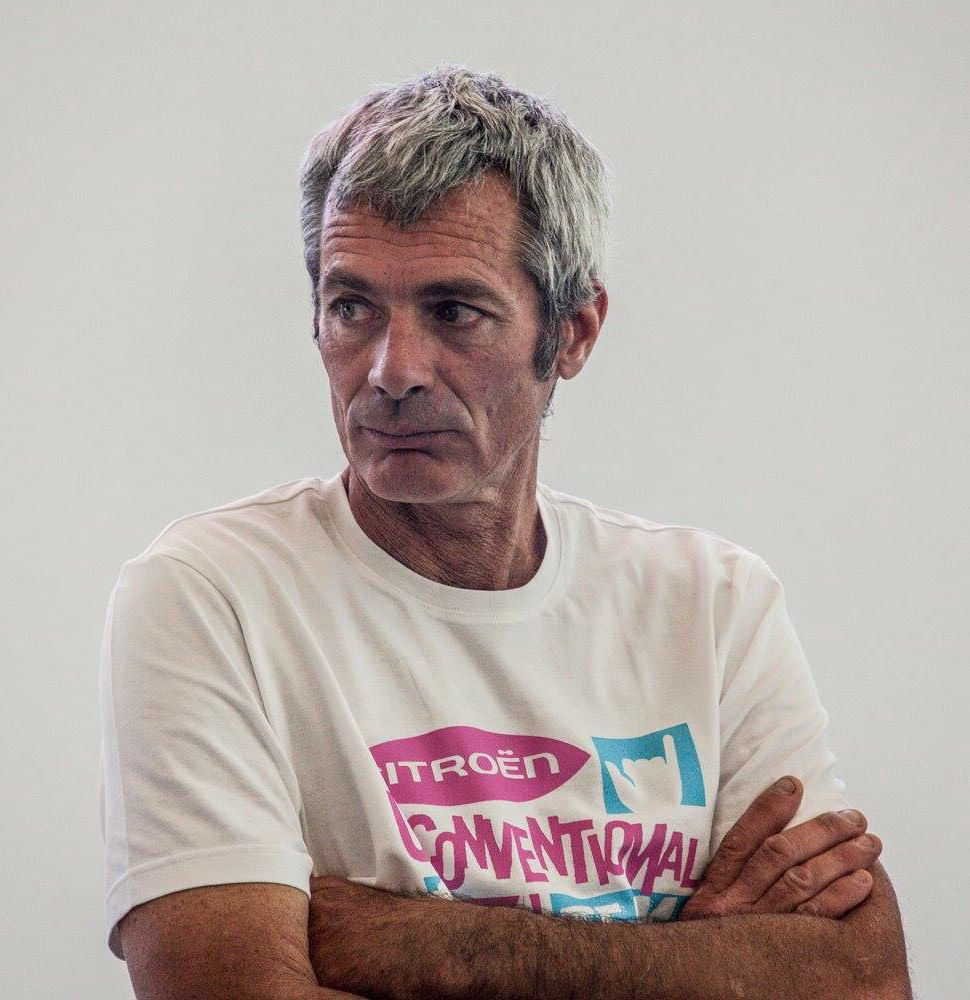
Vittorio Malingri

Vittorio Malingri (19 May 1961) is an Italian navigator, sailor and boat designer.

He was the first Italian to participate in the Vendée Globe and is considered a "Master of the Sea" by a generation of lovers of adventure and offshore sailing.

== Biography ==
=== Early life ===
Son of Franco Malingri, a volcanic designer, and grandson of Doi, an Italian trailblazer in modern ocean sailing, Vittorio was born in Milan and is the oldest of three brothers: Enrico and Francesco.

Since childhood, reading authors such as Salgari, Verne and Dumas, along with his athletic family that involved Vittorio and his brothers by entrusting them responsibility, inspired his dream of exploring the world and living a life dedicated to great adventure and in contact with nature.

Vittorio has been navigating the Mediterranean since he was 5 years old on the legendary CS&RB, the boat Doi and Franco sailed in the first 1973 edition of Whitbread Round the World Race, a round-the-world race with a crew. While still just a boy, he helped them in their final preparations and watched them set off: feeling at the same time thrilled yet disappointed at having to remain on land. He promised himself that, one day, he would be better than them, and he started saving his money for his first boat.

At 16 years old, Vittorio set off with his entire family for a round-the-world cruise, which, for the others, lasted two years while, for Vittorio, “it still isn't over.”

=== Early achievements ===
In 1980, he began designing and building the successful Moana Series.

When he was just 20 years old, he was the first to organize a sailing center in Cayo Largo del Sur, Cuba. Other future protagonists in Italian ocean sailing also worked with him there, such as Giovanni Soldini.

After Cuba, he went to the Bahamas–for two years–where he did charters and worked in nautical tourism. Meanwhile, on his brief trips back to Italy, he began building the boat he had been putting money aside for since he was a boy: a Moana 33’ that he called the Huck Finn after Tom Sawyer’s friend who lived free as the wind on the banks of the Mississippi River.

In 1988, he signed up to take part in the Ostar, the single-handed Trans-Atlantic race: the first of his dreams. He qualified and set off for England with his friend Luca and Anna, a girl he had just met. Unfortunately, during a storm, the boat capsized on the Spanish coast just outside the Strait of Gibraltar. The boat was beached, damaged by the rocky cliffs, but intact. After a tumultuous haul up the slopes of a hill, he got his boat repaired, but not in time to get to Plymouth for the start of the race.

While on land, Vittorio lived with his family in Valdichiascio, a small farm near Gubbio, Umbria (Italy) which became his "land base".

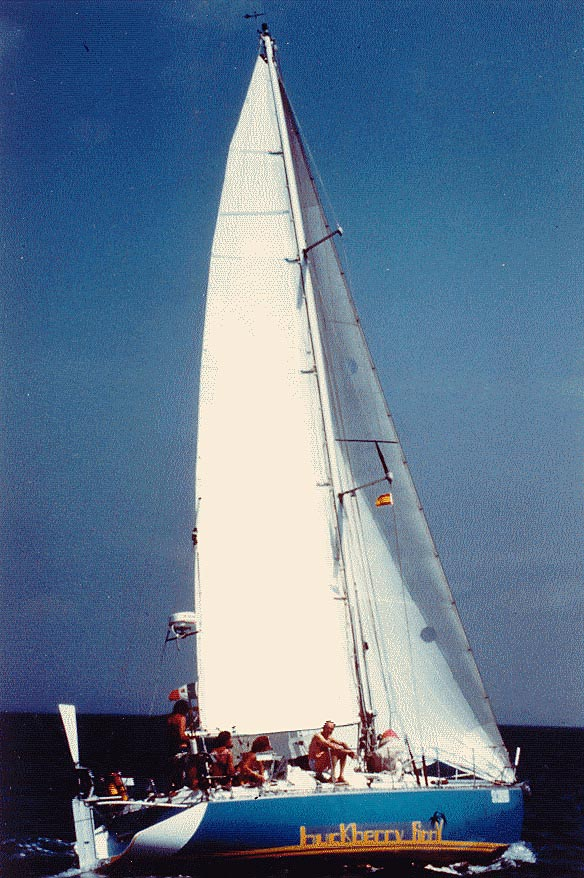
The Huck Finn, his first boat

=== The Everest of the Seas ===
In 1989, he set off with his wife and son, who was just a few months old, to sail around the world. In the Caribbean, he happened to hear an announcement for the Vendée Globe, a round-the-world, single-handed regatta with no stopovers and no assistance, and Vittorio turned his bow around and headed home, sold the boat and with the money he had managed to scrape together, in 1991, designed and began building the Moana 60, the first 60’ Italian Open. With the close support of his family and friends, and thanks also to his father's economic backing, he finished the boat in the family boatyard.

In 1992, Vittorio set off on the Europe 1 Star (formerly the Ostar). Immediately afterwards, he was the first Italian to participate in the Vendée-Globe, "The Everest of the Seas." Unfortunately, he was forced to a halt when his rudder broke 1,700 miles from Cape Horn, just as he was getting ready to take 4th place. After attempting several times to advance toward Cape Horn and finish the race, he decided to withdraw and head for Tahiti, navigating a 2,600-mile against the wind in the South Pacific, without a rudder.

Upon his return to Italy, he used his boat as a sailing school to earn the money he needed annually to take part in the regattas. He also designed a Minitransat, along with Andrea Romanelli, which was then manufactured as a series.

In 1995, he set a monohull sailing record at the Roma x2 regatta, again with the Moana 60.

In 1996, he had the third time in his class at the Europe 1 Star. Vittorio had a budget of 60 million lire compared to the 2.5 billion lire of his rivals, but he was heading up the fleet until just a few miles from the finish.

He held this place at the Québec-Saint Malo that same year. During this regatta, he let a tiny English girl on board for her first ocean regatta: Ellen McArthur. In 1997, in the Roma x2, during a race, he set a record of 54 hours and 16 minutes–which has yet to be beaten–on a 60’ Spirit trimaran. Then, along with Franco Manzoli, he won an overwhelming victory at the Corsica x2 with a 30’ Golfo Tigullio catamaran. In 1998, Manzoli and Malingri repeated this victory, again setting a record of 52 hours for the regatta.

In 1999, he came in first once again at the Corsica x2 with Franco Manzoli.

=== Sea Brothers ===
From the outset, in 2000, he was part of the crew of the TIM trimaran of his friend Giovanni Soldini. In 2001, he participated in the Grand Prix and in the transfer of the boat from Brazil to Italy at the end of the Transat Jacques Vabre.

Along with Giovanni, always on board the TIM trimaran, he won the 2002 edition of Roma x2 after a 3-day, head-to-head standoff with Karine Fauconnier's Sergio Tacchini.

In 2003, he and Giovanni set off again in the Transat Jacques Vabre, but after an excellent start and three days in first place, they were forced to withdraw after their main hull broke in open sea 170 miles from Portugal. They made it back by the sweat of their own brow, despite the boat being totally flooded and ready to break in two once and for all.

That same year, his partner, Maria Teresa, bore his third child, his daughter Nina.

In 2005, Vittorio was once again part of the TIM Progetto Italiano for another Jaques Vabre, which ended with the boat capsizing astoundingly, an event that was given broad media coverage, right when Vittorio and Giovanni were about to take the lead in the race. Vittorio and Giovanni were 450 miles southeast of Dakar when they were picked up by a Russian oil tanker, which later dropped them off in Houston, Texas.

From 2002 to 2006, when he was not competing, he was living on board his 22-meter ketch, the Elmo's Fire.

As a sailing school and charter boat, the Elmo's Fire covered almost 100,000 miles between Europe, the Caribbean and Central America.

=== The Dakar-Guadalupe Record ===
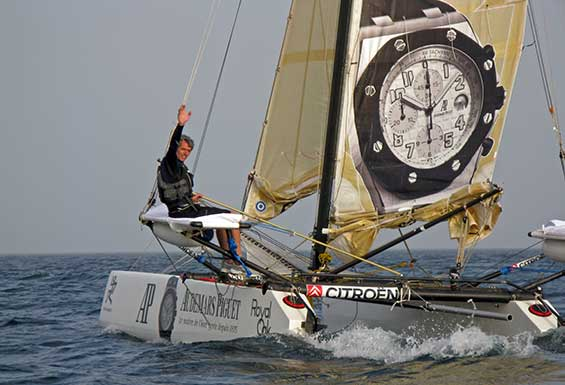
Vittorio Malingri and Royal Oak

After his experience on the TIM trimaran, Vittorio became fascinated by multihull sailing and, already back in 2000, along with the other guys on the team, began tossing around the idea of setting an Atlantic record on a small, beach catamaran. His French idols, who had by now become rivals and friends, had already done it years ago. Occasionally, 2-person crews try to improve the sailing time from Dakar to Guadalupe. The record goes from 17 days to 13 days and then to 11 days and 11 hours, and this is approved for the official record by the WSSR (World Speed Sailing Records). Vittorio's idea was to beat it single-handedly.

In April 2008, with the backing of Citroen and Audemars Piguet, Vittorio took on the Atlantic on a liveaboard catamaran called the Royal Oak, going from Dakar, Senegal to Pointe-à-Pitre, Guadalupe. After an overwhelming start with Vittorio in the lead until the middle of the race, the loss of the satellite telephone he used to receive weather information and the absence of wind in the second half of the race slowed down his race against time. Vittorio set a reference time for the singled-handed sailing record of 13 days and 17 hours.

== Personal life ==
He lives between Umbria, Italy and Ionian Greece and has four children.

== Palmarès ==
1992

- 8th place in the 60' Open – Europe 1 STAR. Single-handed, Trans-Atlantic race from Plymouth (GB) – Newport (USA)

1993

- Vendée Globe. Single-handed, round-the-world race with no stopovers and no assistance from France – France

1994

- 2nd place Rimini-Corfu-Rimini
- 2nd place 500 per Due
- 2nd place Barcolana

1995

- 1st place Roma per Due

1996

- 1st place Roma per Due
- 3rd place Europe 1 Star
- 3rd place Quebec-Saint Malo

1997

- 1st place Roma per Due
- 3rd place Trofeo Zegna
- 1st place Corsica per Due

1998

- 1st place Corsica per Due

1999

- 1st place Corsica per Due

2002

- 1st place Roma per Due

2003

- Jaques Vabre

2005

- Jaques Vabre

2008

- Set a single-handed record sailing from Dakar to Guadalupe of 13 days and 17 hours

== Books ==
- Planando con gli albatross. La prima partecipazione italiana al Vendèe Globe, Ugo Mursia Editore, Milano, 1994
- La Grande onda. Storie di un record e altre regate oceaniche, Longanesi, Milano, 2008
