= Walter Greene (multihull designer) =

Walter Greene is an American multihull sailboat designer and builder. He was born April 28, 1944, in New Haven, CT and died July 21, 2024, aged 80 years.

== Boats designed ==
Partial list.

- Acapella (later renamed Olympus Photo) (1978)

== Boats built ==
Partial list.

- Moxie (1980)
