= José Ugarte =

Costa Rican footballer (born 1980)

Personal information
- Full name: José Humberto Ugarte Miranda
- Date of birth: November 2, 1980 (age 45)
- Place of birth: Liberia, Costa Rica
- Position: Striker

Youth career
- 1997: Municipal Liberia

Senior career*
Years	Team	Apps	(Gls)
1999	Alajuelense		
1999–2002	Municipal Liberia		
2002	Herediano		
2003–2008	Municipal Liberia		
2008–2009	Santacruceña		

International career
1997	Costa Rica U-17		
1999	Costa Rica U-20		
- * Club domestic league appearances and goals

José Humberto Ugarte Miranda (born 2 November 1980 in Liberia) is a Costa Rican football player.

== Club career ==
Ugarte played for Alajuelense and hometown club Municipal Liberia before joining Herediano in summer 2002. He returned to Liberia a year later and was released by the club in summer 2008.

== International career ==
Ugarte played for Costa Rica in 1997 FIFA U-17 World Championship and 1999 FIFA World Youth Championship but failed to make the senior team.
