= Jester (sailboat) =

Jester is the name of a modified Nordic Folkboat sailed by the famous marine inventor and single-handed yachtsman Herbert 'Blondie' Hasler, notably coming second to Francis Chichester in the 1960 OSTAR, completing the voyage in 48 days.

Jester was rigged with Chinese-style junk sails, a rig with the reported advantage of being easier for a singlehanded sailor to manage. Hasler subsequently wrote Practical Junk Rig (ISBN 978-1888671018), a treatise on modern junk rigging of sailboats.
