= Jean Lacombe =

French politician (1943–2025)

- Lacombe c. 1990

Deputy of the French National Assembly
- In office 2 July 1981 – 1 April 1993
- Preceded by: Myriam Barbera
- Succeeded by: Yves Marchand
- Constituency: Hérault's 3rd constituency (1981–1986); Proportional representation (1986–1988); Hérault's 7th constituency (1988–1993)

Personal details
- Born: 16 April 1943 Sète, France
- Died: 23 July 2025 (aged 82) Paris, France
- Party: PS
- Education: École Normale Primaire
- Occupation: Schoolteacher

Jean Lacombe (French: [ʒɑ̃ lakɔ̃b]; 16 April 1943 – 23 July 2025) was a French politician of the Socialist Party.

Lacombe was a founding member of the Institut médico-éducatif, the Institut médicoprofessionnel, and the Centre médico-psycho-pédagogique. He served in the National Assembly from 1981 to 1993.

Lacombe died in Paris on 23 July 2025, at the age of 82.
