= Trice (trimaran) =

- Designer(s): Dick Newick
- Launched: ca. 1960?

Specifications
- Type: Trimaran
- Length: 36 ft (11 m) (LOA)
- Beam: 20 ft (6.1 m)
- Draft: 3 ft (0.91 m)
- Crew: 4

Trice was a 36-foot trimaran sailboat designed by Dick Newick, one the earliest designs in his career (following the 32 ft (9.8 m) Trine), which contributed substantially to the revival of multihull vessels from the 1960s to the late 20th century.

In 1964, Newick entered Trice in the annual Newport, Rhode Island to Bermuda race to evaluate its relative speed. Media was critical, with one editorial calling it "unsafe on any sea". Newick waited until the traditional, much larger monohulls boats had set off then proceeded to beat all but two of them.

== See also ==
- List of multihulls
- Cheers (proa), a later vessel designed by Newick shortly after Trice
- Dick Newick
