= Richard Konkolski =

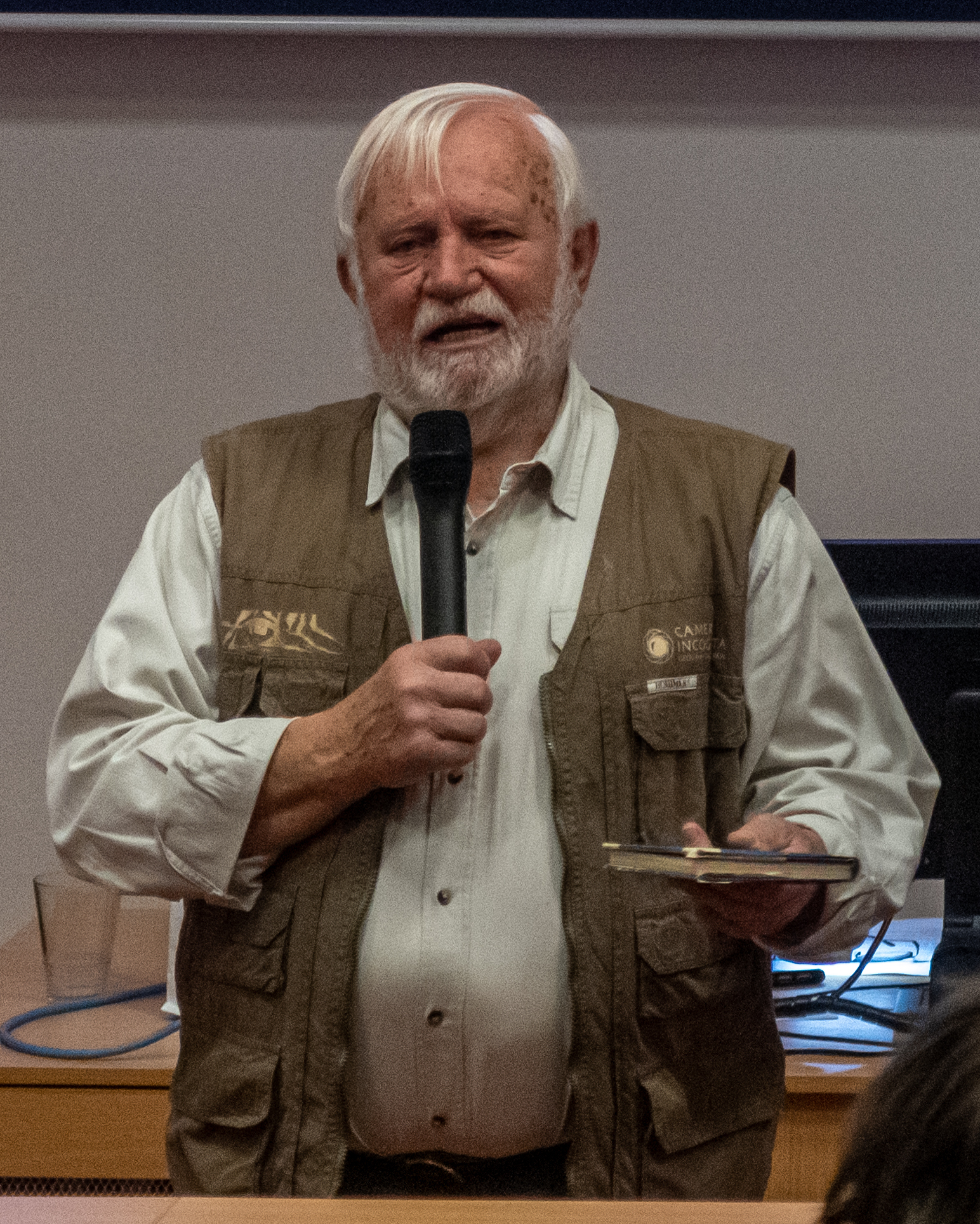
Konkolski in 2024

Richard Konkolski (born July 6, 1943) is a Czech-American around-the-world sailor. He was born in Oderberg, Nazi Germany (now Bohumín, Czech Republic), and has been a naturalized US citizen since 1994.
