= Cheers (proa) =

- Designer(s): Dick Newick
- Launched: 1967

Specifications
- Type: Proa
- Length: 36 ft (11 m) (LOA)

Cheers was a proa sailboat designed by Dick Newick in 1967. It was one of the earliest designs in his career, which contributed substantially to the revival of multihull vessels from the 1960s to the late 20th century. Like a traditional proa, Cheers had no bow or stern and could sail in either direction.Cheers is a 40 ft Proa designed by Dick Newick specifically as an entrant in the 1968 OSTAR, a single handed transatlantic race. Cheers was given an award by the Ida Lewis Yacht Club, Newport Rhode Island, for being the first U.S. yacht to finish a Transatlantic Single Handed Race and the Amateur Yacht Research Society honored the team with a special award for research

== Race win ==
In 1968 Newick entered Cheers in the quadrennial Observer Single-Handed Trans-Atlantic Race (Ostar), an open class solo trans-Atlantic race from Plymouth, England, to Newport, Rhode Island, sponsored by The Observer. Cheers finished third, beating much larger conventional boats under skipper Tom Follett who became the first American to have finished the race.

== Legacy ==
Cheers is now owned by a French couple, who restored it. France declared the boat a historical monument.

== See also ==
- Trice (trimaran), an earlier vessel designed by Newick shortly before Cheers
