= Jean-Yves Terlain =

French offshore sailor and navigator

Personal information
- Nationality: French
- Born: 12 November 1944 (age 81) Angers

Sailing career
- Sport: Sailing

Jean-Yves Terlain (born November 12, 1944, in Angers), is a French navigator and architect. He is the uncle of the famous sailing brothers Bruno and Loïck Peyron.

He studied naval architecture at the Sorbonne and was the youngest sailor to finish the 1968 OSTAR, sailing singlehanded from Plymouth, England to Newport, Rhode Island. He sailed on a revolutionary 3-masted monocoque called Vendredi 13 (Friday 13); the name came from the fact that her construction was financed by the French movie director Claude Lelouche, famous for his first movie Un homme et une femme (A man and a Woman); Friday 13 was the name of his production company.Terlain competed in the first Vendée Globe in 1989-1990 where he had to retire onboard UAP having lost the mast in the Indian Ocean. The boat was marked by it unique ahead of it time enclosed cockpit.
