= Very Slender Vessel =

Type of high-speed, wave-piercing craft

A Very Slender Vessel (VSV) is a high-speed, wave-piercing craft. It is designed to give a comfortable ride over long, high-speed transits in high seas.

Normal boats travelling at high speed in rough seas can produce a very uncomfortable ride with g-force as high as 20g. Wave piercing vessels avoid this by going through waves instead of over them, at speeds that can exceed 60 knots (110 km/h).

== Military ==
=== North Korea ===
It was revealed in 2015 that North Korea had under development a VSV attack boat, reported to be deployed on the western side of the Korean peninsula. It was first detected on trials by satellite surveillance late in 2014. The first images of the completed vessel were released by North Korean media in July 2018, after a visit to the Chongjin shipyard by leader Kim Jong-un.

=== Singapore ===
The Singapore Army operates VSV craft in special forces units. It was speculated in 2018 that they were to be replaced by new craft.

=== United Kingdom ===
VSV craft such as the Royal Marine VSV are used by the Royal Marines and the Special Boat Service.
