= Yves Marre =

French entrepreneur, inventor and adventurer (born 1951)

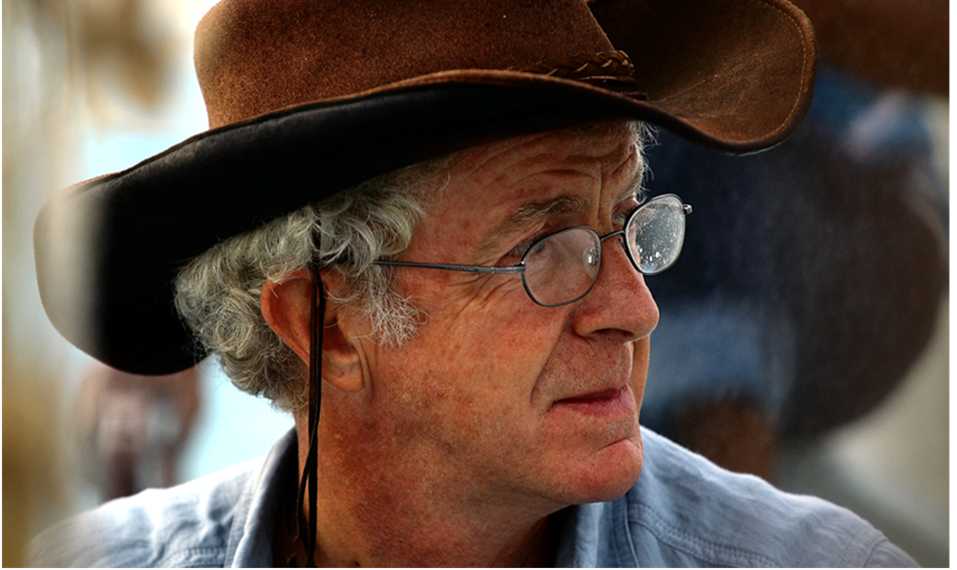
Yves Marre, August 2013

Yves Marre (born 1951) is a French entrepreneur, inventor and adventurer, co-founder of Friendship (NGO) in Bangladesh, co-founder of NGO Watever in France and creator of TaraTari Shipyard in Bangladesh.

== Studies ==
Marre received a scholarship from the French Air Force at 17 years old. Received the degree of private airplane pilot at the age of 18.

== Career ==
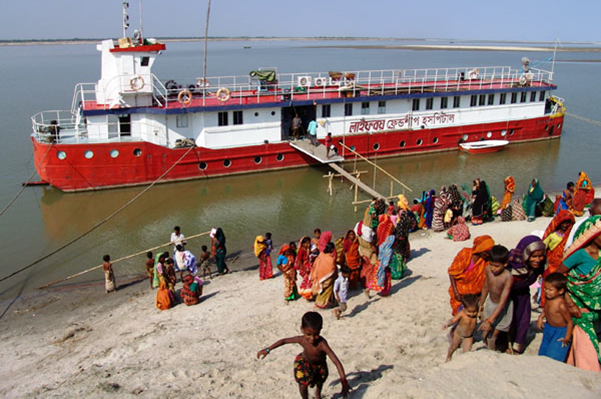
Lifebuoy Friendship Hospital

1973 to 1996, career at Air France as cabin crew. In parallel, he participates in various projects as a pilot and sailor:

- For “Aviation without Borders” NGO: carries out humanitarian missions as co-pilot and logistician in Central Africa and instructor of seaplane in the Colombian Amazon rainforest for a French doctor.
- Flight instructor, micro light pilot, designer and trial pilot of “Propulsar” (motorized paraglider from his invention, with which he flew across the English Channel as a “premiere” from France to England in 1988).
- He sails across the Atlantic Ocean on its river barge, also as a “premiere”, from Paris to Miami in 1990.
- In 1992, assists Gerard Feldzer in his tests of the pedal helium balloon with which Nicolas Hulot and Gerard Feldzer, then Director of the Museum of Air and Space of France, attempted a flight across the Atlantic Ocean.

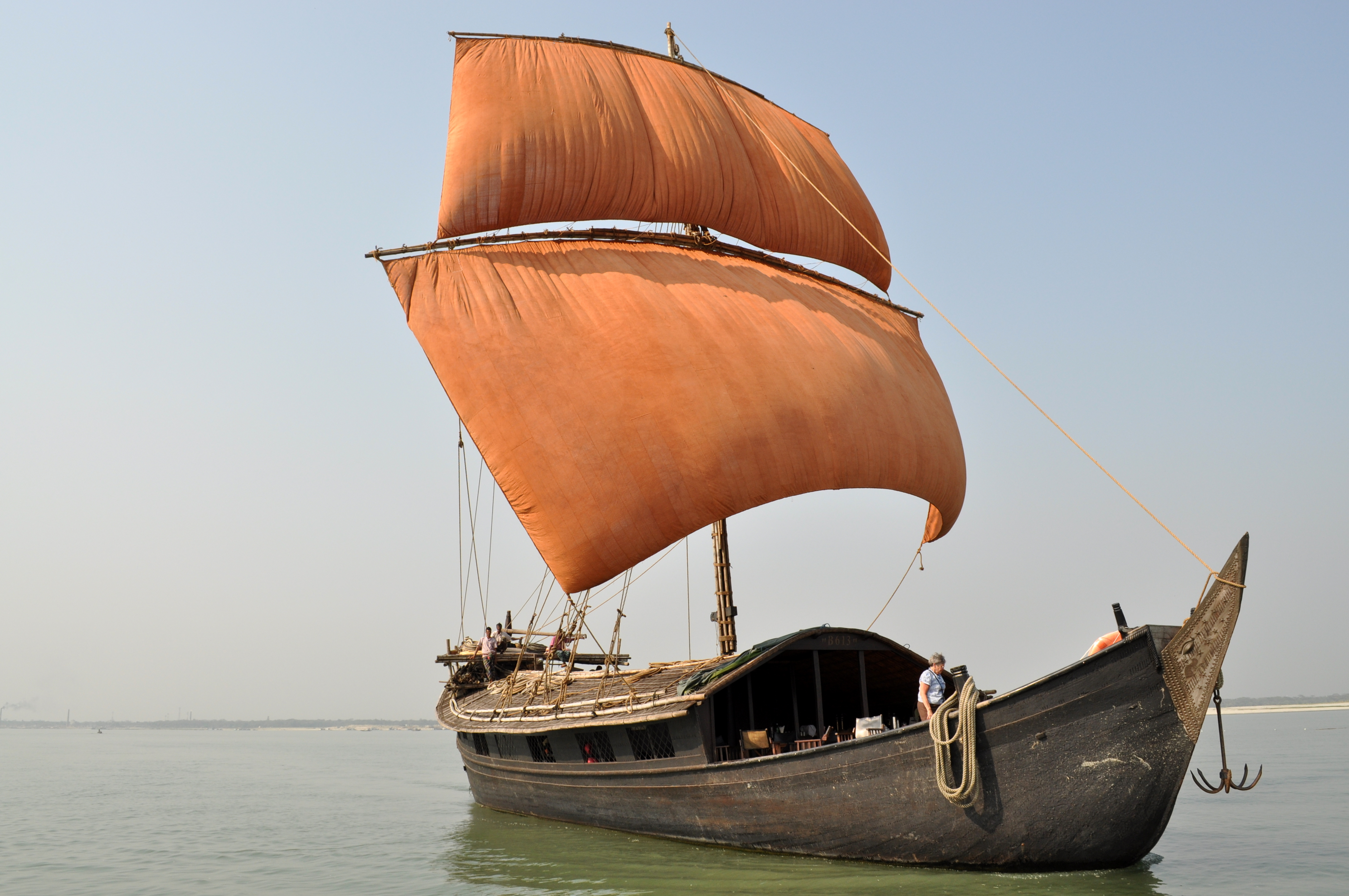
The "B613"

1993: Initiates the project: "A Hospital Barge for Bangladesh" and creates the first Friendship (NGO), in France. The French government allots Friendship a river barge of 38.5 m through the Companies Fluviale de Transport.

1994: Sails this river barge from France to Bangladesh, also as a “premiere”.

1997: Founds with his wife, Runa Khan Marre, Contic Cruises, a river tourism company. Launches the largest traditional sailing ship in Bangladesh: the “B613”.

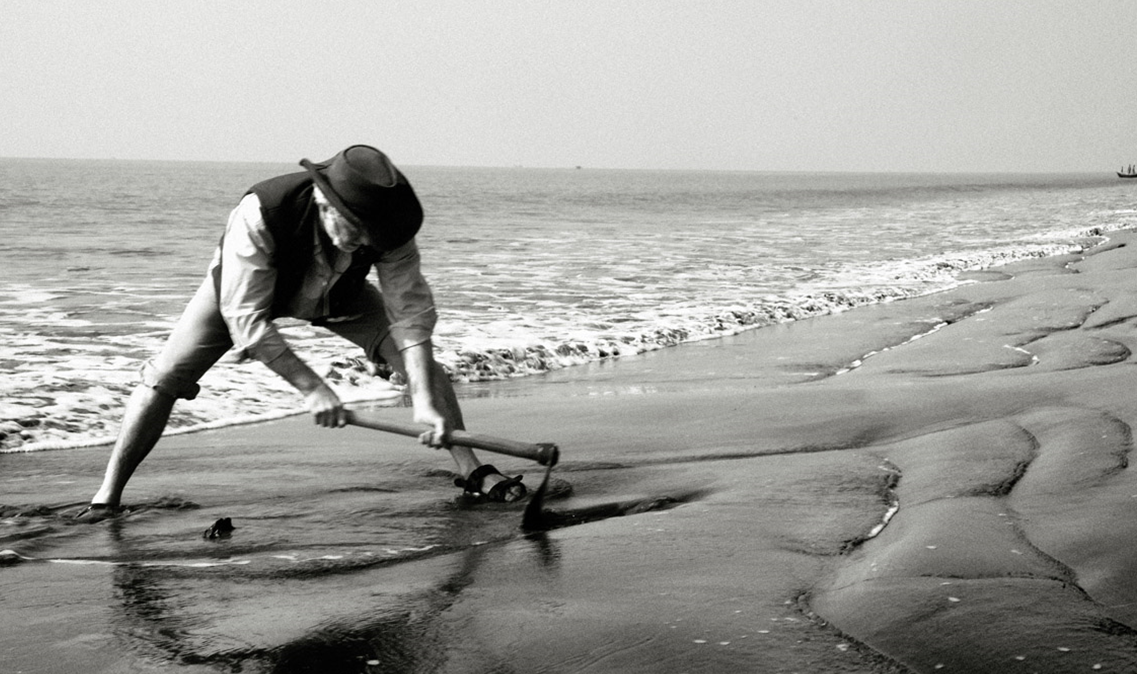
Yves Marre, head of Mission for the archeological Department under the Ministry of Culture of Bangladesh

1998: Founds with his wife, Runa Khan Marre, Friendship Bangladesh.

2004: Creates TaraTari Shipyard Ltd.

2008: Curator of "Les Voiles anciennes du Bangladesh – Ancient Sails of Bangladesh" an exhibition from Friendship Bangladesh, at the National Maritime Museum of Paris and Brest, and then in 2010 at Port Museum of Douarnenez.

2010: Co-founder of French NGO Watever, with Marc Van Peteghem, creator of the naval architecture agency VPLP, Alain Connan and Gérald Similowski.

2013: Head of Mission for the archeological Department under the Ministry of Culture of Bangladesh for the excavation of an ancient shipwreck on the beach of Kuakata (southern Bangladesh).

2014: Co-founder of the Maritime Security & Rescue Society, the maritime rescue association of Bangladesh, along with Admiral Taher, Admiral KS Hussain and other Directors.

== Books ==
- Sur le Coffre de l'homme mort, co-author, Elocoquent edition
- La Paix niche sur l'Atlantique, Revue Fluvial
- Navigateur solidaire, Isabelle Le Goff edition, 2014

== Documentaries ==
- "Escale au Bangladesh", Thalassa
- "L'Empreinte du tigre", Ushuaia – Nicolas Hulot
- "Les Héros de la nature", Vue du Ciel – Yann Arthus-Bertrand

== Awards ==
- 2008: Won the first award of French Senate for Representation of France
- 2012: Won an award for his actions for France Reputation
- 2013: Is bestowed the Bangladeshi passport & citizenship (at the initiative of the Prime Minister)
