= Watever =

NGO Watever
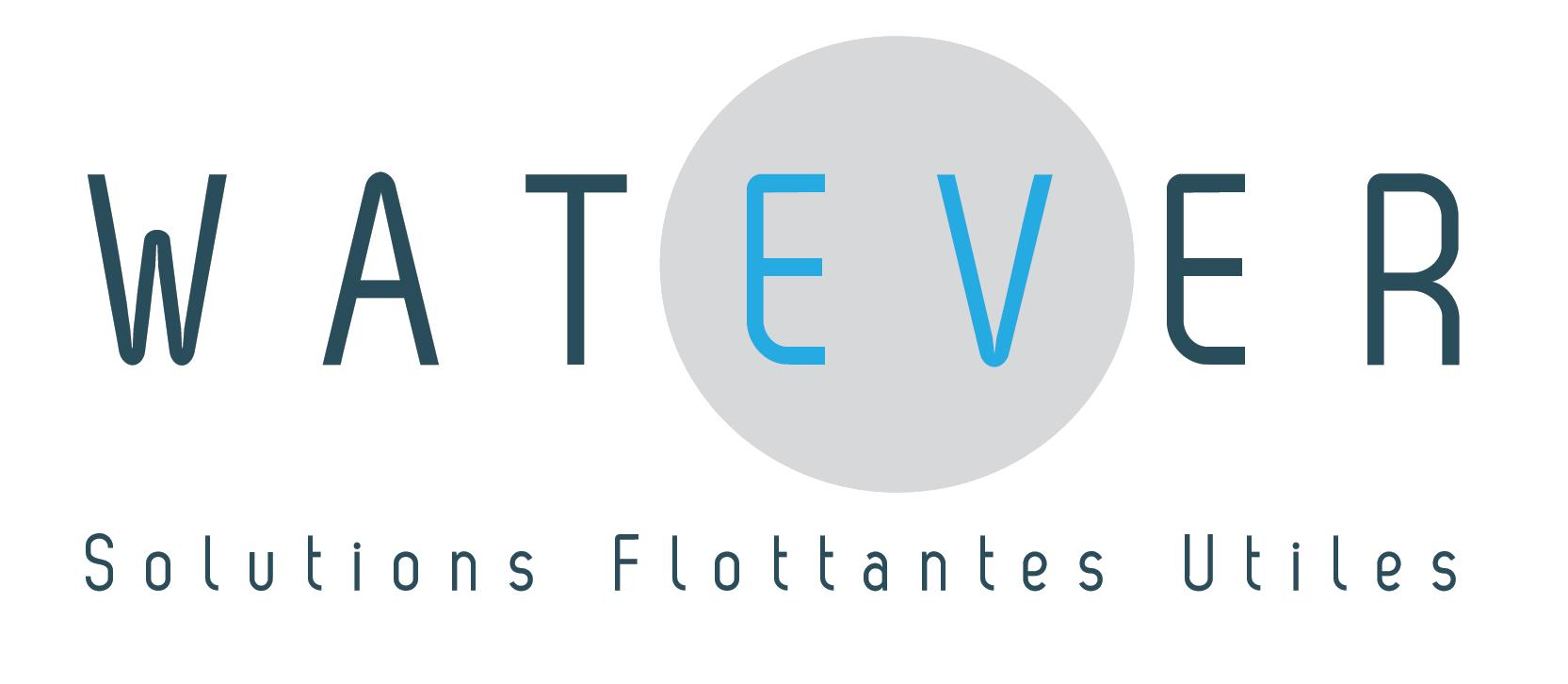
- Founded: 2010
- Founder: Marc Van Peteghem, Yves Marre
- Type: French NGO
- Location(s): France and Bangladesh
- Key people: Marc Van Peteghem, Yves Marre, Alain Connan, Gérald Similowski

Watever is a French non-governmental association (NGO) composed of professionals from the maritime, transport, and development industries. It was established in 2010 by Marc Van Peteghem, Yves Marre, Alain Connan and Gérald Similowski with the conviction that boats can be a gateway to development. The NGO primarily focuses on underprivileged populations living on the shores of oceans and rivers, and provides them access to floating solutions uniquely adapted to their economic, social and climatic situations.

== History ==
The NGO arises from the encounter of its two founding members in 2004: Marc Van Peteghem (president) and Yves Marre (vice-president).

A friendship was born between these two men who share the same values and resulted in several projects.

Together they developed the concept of floating ambulance in Bangladesh, for the floating hospitals of Friendship, and produced the first unsinkable boats for the fishermen of the country. In 2010, they created NGO Watever with Alain Connan and Gérald Similowski to support the development of shipbuilding industry in Bangladesh, working on innovation and transfer of technologies.

Bangladesh is considered as the pilot country where Watever started providing its services.

== Field of activities ==
Watever develops floating solutions to support people living on the shores of oceans and large rivers. Its main aims are:

- Research and development
- Support to local shipbuilding through Taratari shipyard, their local partner in Bangladesh
- The implementation of a training program for the manufacture and maintenance of boats made of composite materials

The NGO also supports other maritime projects in Bangladesh such as:

- The preservation and the enhancement of the local naval heritage
- The creation of the M.S.R.S, the "Maritime Security & Rescue Society", a sea rescue company in Bangladesh

== Projects ==
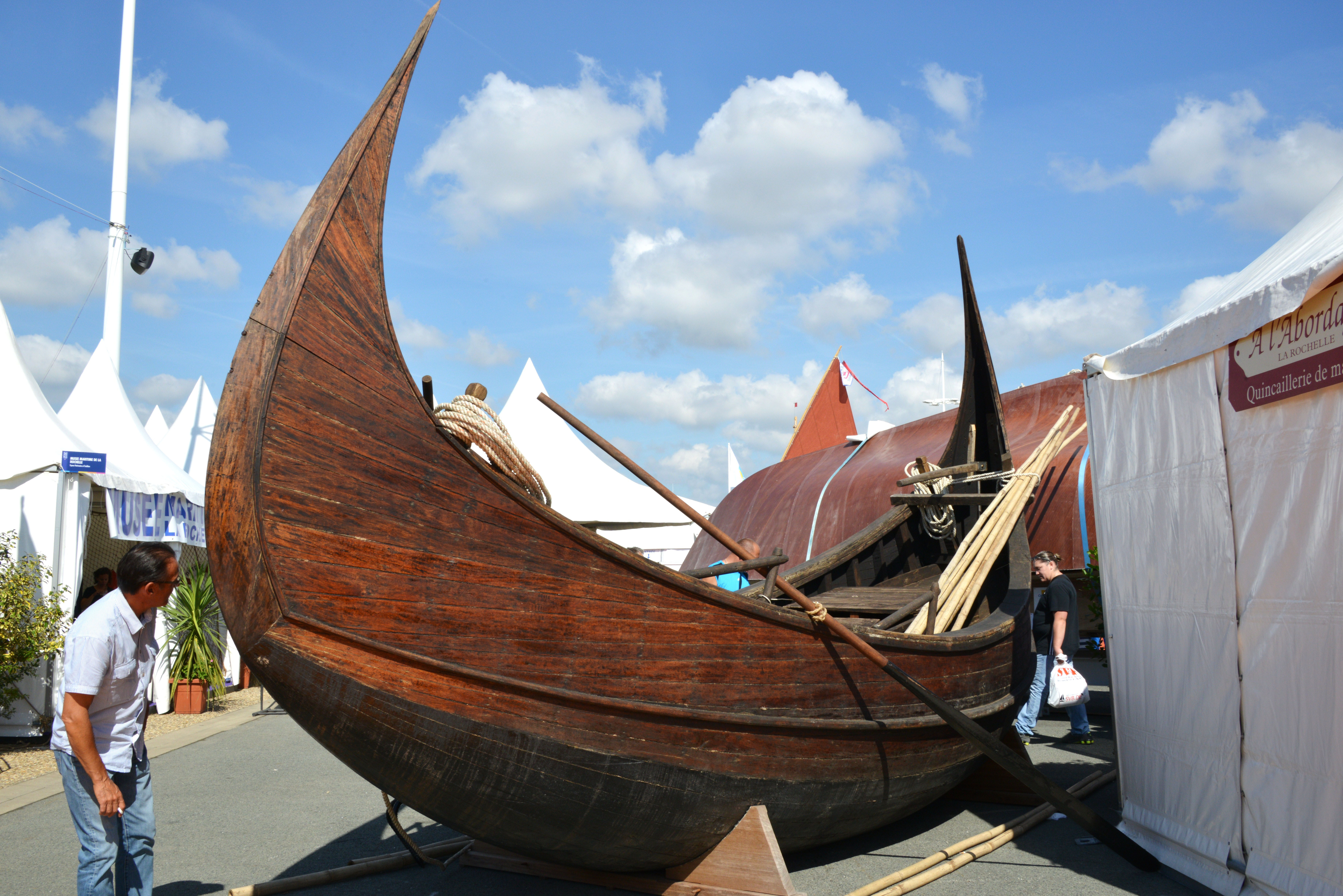
The "Moon Boat" of Cox's Bazar

- 2005: Launch of the first two ambulances catamaran of Bangladesh
- 2007: Design and production of the prototype of the first unsinkable fishing boat of Bangladesh
- 2010: Creation of NGO Watever
- 2010: Launch of the first unsinkable fishing boat of Bangladesh
- 2010: Corentin de Chatelperron, volunteer sent by NGO Watever to Taratari shipyard, sails from Bangladesh to France on a 40% Jute made sailing boat. Birth of « Gold of Bengal » project, which will be supported for three years by NGO Watever.
- 2011: Renovation and increase of the medicalized area of the French barge "Lifebuoy Friendship Hospital", first floating hospital of Friendship (NGO)
- 2012: Taratari shipyard delivers 7 shuttle-boats for the children of Rangamati lake ordered by Unicef
- 2012: Taratari shipyard delivers 60 unsinkable fishing boats for Food and Agriculture Organization
- 2013: Excavation of the "Golden Boat" from Kuakata (southwestern Bangladesh), a wreck that was buried for over one hundred years
- 2013: First training of the country of 15 technicians in the maintenance and repair of fishing vessels
- 2013: Launch of "Gold of Bengal" prototype, a sailing boat made of 100% Jute and Polyester resin.
- 2013: Construction and preservation of the "Moon Boat" of Cox's Bazar
- 2014: Beginning of the production of 10 new shuttle-boats for children of Rangamati Lake

== Projects in development ==
- 2014: Launching of Watever Training Center for composite shipbuilding
- 2014: Launching of a research project on bio-composite made from bamboo
- 2014: Launching of the Maritime Security and Rescue Society in Bangladesh

== Partners ==
- A.K Khan & Company Ltd.
- Alliance française
- Crucell
- Food and Agriculture Organization
- Friendship (NGO)
- Kaïros
- Outremer Yachting
- Taratari shipyard
- Unicef
- Van Peteghem Lauriot-Prévost VPLP
- Veolia Environnement
- Zeppelin-Geo
