= Lagoon 55 catamaran (1987) =

Sailboat class

Development
- Designer: Van Peteghem/Lauriot-Prevost; Patrick le Quément
- Location: France
- Year: 1987
- Builder: Lagoon Catamaran
- Role: Cruiser
- Name: Lagoon 55 catamaran

Boat
- Displacement: 28,660 lb (13,000 kg)
- Draft: 4.5 ft (1.4 m)

Hull
- Type: catamaran
- Construction: fiberglass
- LOA: 55 ft (17 m)
- LWL: 53.5 ft (16.3 m)
- Engine: Two Yanmar diesel engines

Hull appendages
- Keel: twin keels
- Rudder: spade-type rudders

Rig
- Rig type: Bermuda rig

Sails
- Sailplan: Masthead rigged sloop

The Lagoon 55 catamaran is a large ocean-going sailing catamaran that was designed by VPLP (a French-based naval architecture firm founded by Marc Van Peteghem and Vincent Lauriot-Prévost). First built in France in 1987, it was one of the earliest large production cruising catamarans available both for private owners and for the yacht charter role. These boats were built by Lagoon catamaran, a specialist multihull division of Jeanneau in France.

== Design ==
The Lagoon 55 was the company's's first production design, with 20 boats built. These boats were hand laid up using woven e-glass and epoxy vacuum bagged in a mold. Some of the L55's were also built using carbon reinforcements and Kevlar inlaid in the hulls below the waterline for abrasion resistance.

=== 2021 successor ===
The Lagoon 55 was succeeded in 2021 by a new model (with the same name) from the same design team and manufacturer. The newer model had nearly twice the displacement of the Mk.I's 13 tonnes and, with its flybridge and greater windage, was less "sporty" and more "comfortable cruiser" than the original sleek Lagoon 55.

== See also ==
- Jeanneau yachts
- List of multihulls
- List of sailing boat types
