= Lagoon 450 =

Sailboat class

Lagoon 450 F
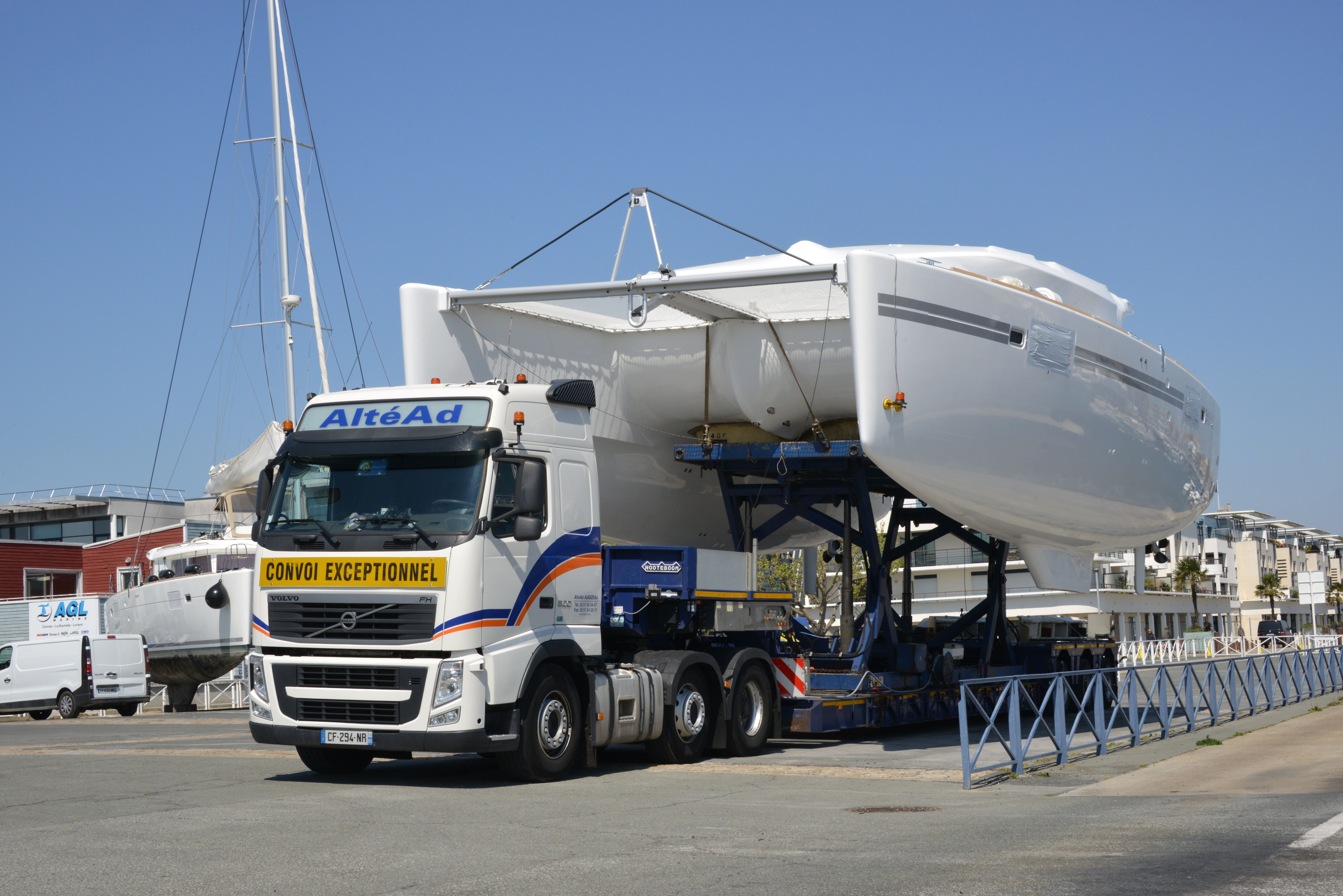
- A Lagoon 450 F on a transporter, showing keel configuration

Development
- Designer: Van Peteghem/Lauriot-Prevost; Patrick le Quément; Nauta Design
- Location: France
- Year: 2014
- No. built: more than 850
- Builder: Lagoon Catamaran
- Role: Cruiser
- Name: Lagoon 450 F

Boat
- Displacement: 33,069 lb (15,000 kg)
- Draft: 4.33 ft (1.32 m)

Hull
- Type: catamaran
- Construction: fiberglass
- LOA: 45 ft 10 in (13.97 m)
- LWL: 43 ft 11 in (13.39 m)
- Beam: 25 ft 10 in (7.87 m)
- Engine: Two Yanmar 4JH45 45 hp (34 kW) diesel engines

Hull appendages
- Keel: twin keels
- Rudder: Twin spade-type rudders

Rig
- Rig type: Bermuda rig

Sails
- Sailplan: fractional rigged sloop
- Mainsail area: 850 sq ft (79 m^{2})
- Jib/genoa area: 527 sq ft (49.0 m^{2})
- Other sails: square-topped manisail: 872 sq ft (81.0 m^{2}) code 0: 1,001 sq ft (93.0 m^{2})
- Upwind sail area: 1,399 sq ft (130.0 m^{2})
- Downwind sail area: 1,873 sq ft (174.0 m^{2})

The Lagoon 450 is a French sailboat that was designed by Van Peteghem/Lauriot-Prevost, with exterior design by Patrick le Quément and interior design by Nauta Design. It was intended as a cruiser, as well as for the yacht charter market, and was first built in 2014.

== Production ==
The design was built by Lagoon catamaran in France, starting in 2015 and replaced the Lagoon 440 in production. The boat was built in two versions, the Lagoon 450 S "Sportop" and the Lagoon 450 F, with a flying bridge. Production of the 450 F ended in 2019 and the 450 S in 2021, with more than 850 boats completed.

The boat was replaced in production by the Lagoon 46 in 2019.

== Design ==
The Lagoon 450 is a recreational catamaran, built predominantly of polyester fiberglass sandwich, with wood trim. It has a fractional sloop rig, with a deck-stepped mast, two sets of swept diamond spreaders and aluminum spars with 1X19 stainless steel wire rigging. The hulls have slightly raked stems, reverse transoms with swimming platforms, dual internally mounted spade-type rudders controlled by a wheel and twin fixed fin keels.

The boat has a draft of 4.33 ft (1.32 m) with the standard twin keels.

The design has sleeping accommodations for six to eight people in three or four cabin interiors. The three-cabin "owner's" layout has a single cabin in the starboard hull with a double island berth aft, a lounge and storage amidships, and a large head and shower forward. The port hull has cabins fore and aft, with two private heads in between. The four-cabin "charter" configuration uses the same two-cabin arrangement in both hulls. The central salon has an L-shaped settee and the navigation station, while the aft cockpit lounge has a U-shaped settee on the port side. The boat may be steered from the nav station using the autopilot. The galley is located on the port side of the main salon. The galley is U-shaped and is equipped with a four-burner stove, a refrigerator, freezer and a double sink. Cabin maximum headroom is 80 in (203 cm).

For sailing downwind the design may be equipped with a code 0 sail of 1,001 sq ft (93.0 m^{2}).

== Variants ==
Lagoon 450 F
This model with a flying bridge was produced from 2014 to 2019. It displaces 33,290 lb (15,100 kg) and is fitted with two Japanese Yanmar 4JH45 diesel engines of 45 hp (34 kW) each. The fuel tank holds 275 U.S. gallons (1,040 L; 229 imp gal) and the fresh water tank has a capacity of 92 U.S. gallons (350 L; 77 imp gal). Due to the raised boom to accommodate the flying bridge, the upwind sail area is 1,399 sq ft (130.0 m^{2}).
Lagoon 450 S
This "Sportop" model locates the raised helming station aft of the salon on the starboard side, under a rigid bimini top. It displaces 33,069 lb (15,000 kg) and is fitted with two Japanese Yanmar diesel engines of 45 or 57 hp (34 or 43 kW). The fuel tank holds 275 U.S. gallons (1,040 L; 229 imp gal) and the fresh water tank has a capacity of 92 U.S. gallons (350 L; 77 imp gal). Due to the lower boom without the flying bridge, the upwind sail area is 1,421 sq ft (132.0 m^{2}).

== Operational history ==
In a review, Katamarans reported, "it's pretty easy to see why the Lagoon 450F and 450S are such hot sellers. They hit the sweet spot for the charter market (2+ families on board), and they have managed to appeal to owner-operator cruisers as well. Many disparagingly refer to the Lagoon 450 as a 'condomaran', but you can't knock 'em."

In a 2011 Sail Magazine review, Tom Dove wrote, "the wind at Annapolis was disappointing, but the big Lagoon’s performance was not. The boat still tacked reliably and moved gently along on all points of sail in zephyrs that peaked at about 5 knots. This was surprising, considering this is a relatively heavy cruising cat loaded with accessories. We did have the optional square-top mainsail on our boat in lieu of the standard full-batten main. Perhaps that’s worth considering if you sail on chronically wind-deprived waters."

Lagoon 450 Bulkhead problems

In March of 2021 lagoon admitted a problem withe forward bulkheads having a weak point in its construction and may crack. Lagoon owners are offered a free inspection of the bulkheads and besides that repairs are managed on a case by case basis either based on warranty or other history of the vessel.

== See also ==
- List of multihulls
- List of sailing boat types
