= Lagoon 55 =

Sailboat class

Development
- Designer: Van Peteghem/Lauriot-Prevost; Patrick le Quément; Nauta Design
- Location: France
- Year: 2021
- Builder: Lagoon Catamaran
- Role: Cruiser
- Name: Lagoon 55

Boat
- Displacement: 61,068 lb (27,700 kg)
- Draft: 5.09 ft (1.55 m)

Hull
- Type: catamaran
- Construction: fiberglass
- LOA: 54.33 ft (16.56 m)
- LWL: 53.77 ft (16.39 m)
- Beam: 29.53 ft (9.00 m)
- Engine: Two Yanmar 4JH80 80 hp (60 kW) diesel engines

Hull appendages
- Keel: twin keels
- Rudder: spade-type rudders

Rig
- Rig type: Bermuda rig

Sails
- Sailplan: fractional rigged sloop
- Mainsail area: 1,151 sq ft (106.9 m^{2})
- Jib/genoa area: 796 sq ft (74.0 m^{2})
- Gennaker area: 2,928 sq ft (272.0 m^{2})
- Other sails: code 0: 1,658 sq ft (154.0 m^{2})
- Upwind sail area: 1,948 sq ft (181.0 m^{2})
- Downwind sail area: 3,099 sq ft (287.9 m^{2})

The Lagoon 55 is a French sailing catamaran that was designed by Van Peteghem/Lauriot-Prevost with the exterior design by Patrick le Quément and interior design by Nauta Design. It was intended as a cruiser and also for the yacht charter role and first built in 2021.

The design won a 2021 British Yachting Award and a 2021 Oceanway China Yacht Award.

The boat carries the same name as a 1987 boat, which was Lagoon's first production design, with 20 boats built.

== Production ==
The design has been built by Lagoon catamaran in France, since 2021, and remained in production in 2023.

== Design ==
The Lagoon 55 is a recreational catamaran, built predominantly of vacuum infused polyester fiberglass, with wood trim. The design is solid fiberglass below the waterline, with a balsa core above the waterline and in the deck. It has a fractional sloop rig, with a deck-stepped mast, two sets of swept spreaders and aluminum spars with stainless steel wire rigging. The hulls have plumb stems, reverse transoms with swimming platforms, dual internally mounted spade-type rudders controlled by a wheel on the flying bridge and twin fixed fin keels. It displaces 61,068 lb (27,700 kg).

The boat has a draft of 5.09 ft (1.55 m) with the standard twin keels.

The boat is fitted with twin Japanese Yanmar 4JH80 diesel engines of 80 hp (60 kW) or, optionally, two French Nanni Industries N4.115 115 hp (86 kW) diesel engines with saildrives for docking and maneuvering. The fuel tank holds 291 U.S. gallons (1,100 L; 242 imp gal) and the fresh water tank has a capacity of 254 U.S. gallons (960 L; 211 imp gal).

The design has been built with a number of different interior configurations with four to six cabins, providing sleeping accommodation for eight to 12 people. Each cabin has a private head with a shower. In typical configuration, the main salon has an L-shaped settee on the port side. The galley is located on the starboard side of the main salon, aft. The galley is L-shaped and is equipped with a stove, a refrigerator, freezer and a double sink. A navigation station is in the main salon, opposite the galley, on the port side. Additional seating is located in the after cockpit lounge, on the flying bride and forward of the coach house.

For reaching or running downwind the design may be equipped with a code 0 sail of 1,658 sq ft (154.0 m^{2}) or an asymmetrical spinnaker of 2,928 sq ft (272.0 m^{2}).

== Operational history ==
A Yachting World 2021 review, noted, "it seems there's now no longer a question of whether to have a flybridge on a 55ft cat – it's a mandatory feature. The optional rigid bimini obviously means the boom is quite a lot higher, compelling the crew to undertake some challenging manoeuvres. A second access to the flybridge on the starboard side deck, an option not fitted on our test boat, will avoid the need for any further acrobatics. Without it, it's a long way from the helm to the foredeck via the aft cockpit to, for example, set the Code 0. These couple of reservations aside, the flybridge has a lot going for it."

A Katamarans review wrote, "during our test sail off Port Ginesta, we hit 7-8 knots in a 15 knot breeze with full mainsail and jib. Once the 154m² Code 0 was unfurled, we accelerated to almost 10 knots with the wind on the beam. Not bad for a boat weighing over 30 tonnes with all the gear on ... With the 272m² asymmetric spinnaker, you will maximise your speed heading on a broad reach as well. Lagoon are reporting 6 knots in only 7 knots of true wind, 8 knots in 10. You are not going to be breaking any speed records on the Lagoon 55, but the performance is nevertheless impressive for such a spacious boat."

In a 2022 review for Cruising World, Mark Pillsbury wrote, "sailing along, it didn’t take me long to find my sweet spot on the 55: the seat incorporated into the far forward lifeline stanchion, where I hung one arm over the wire and sat watching the bows slice through the waves. Believe me when I say that I could have stayed there all day."

== See also ==
- List of multihulls
- List of sailing boat types
