= Taratari =

Coordinates: 22.3933°N 91.8814°E

Taratari shipyard
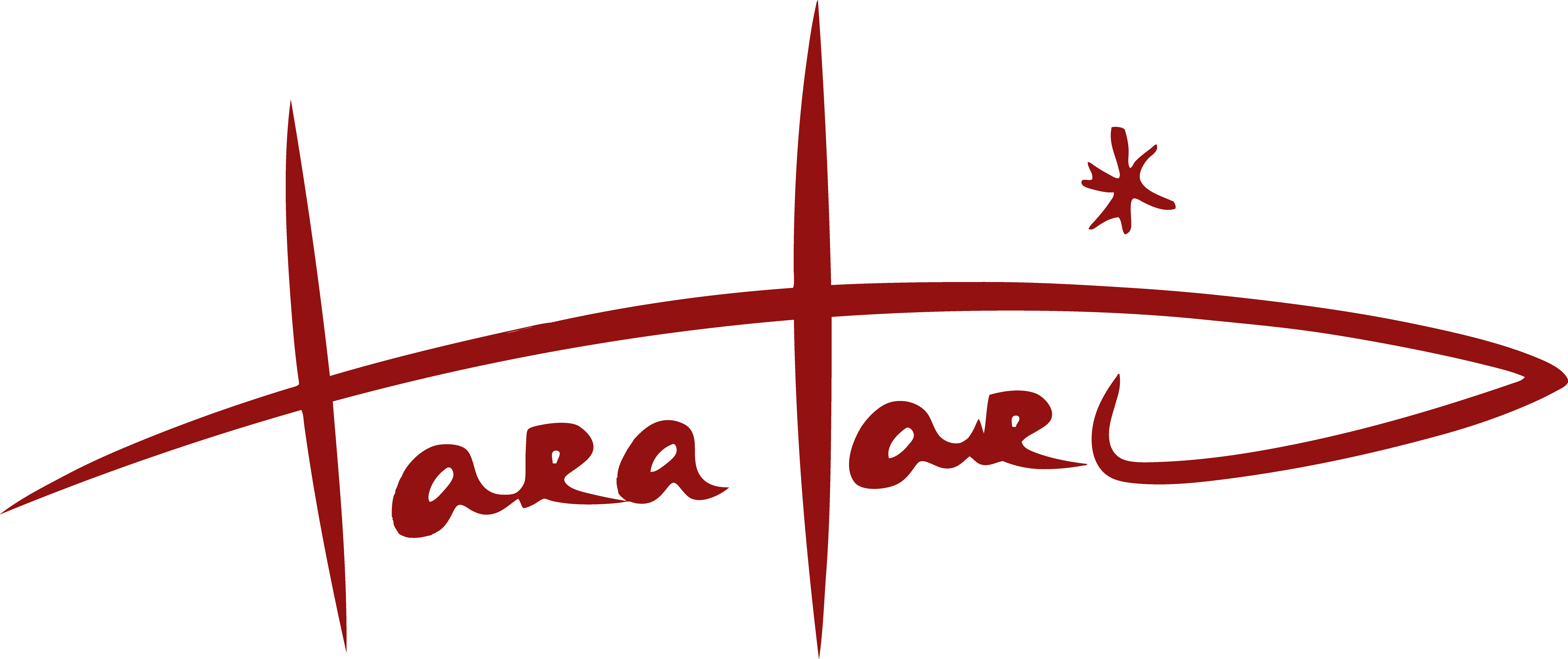
- Type: Private
- Industry: Shipbuilding
- Founded: 1996; 30 years ago
- Headquarters: Chittagong, Bangladesh
- Key people: Yves Marre (Managing Director)
- Products: Floating Hospital, floating ambulance, fishing boats, transport boats
- Owner: Yves Marre

Taratari is a shipyard founded in 2004 in Bangladesh by the French sailor Yves Marre. Supported by the French NGO Watever, it aims to develop a modern, safe, and responsible nautical production industry in the country.

== History ==
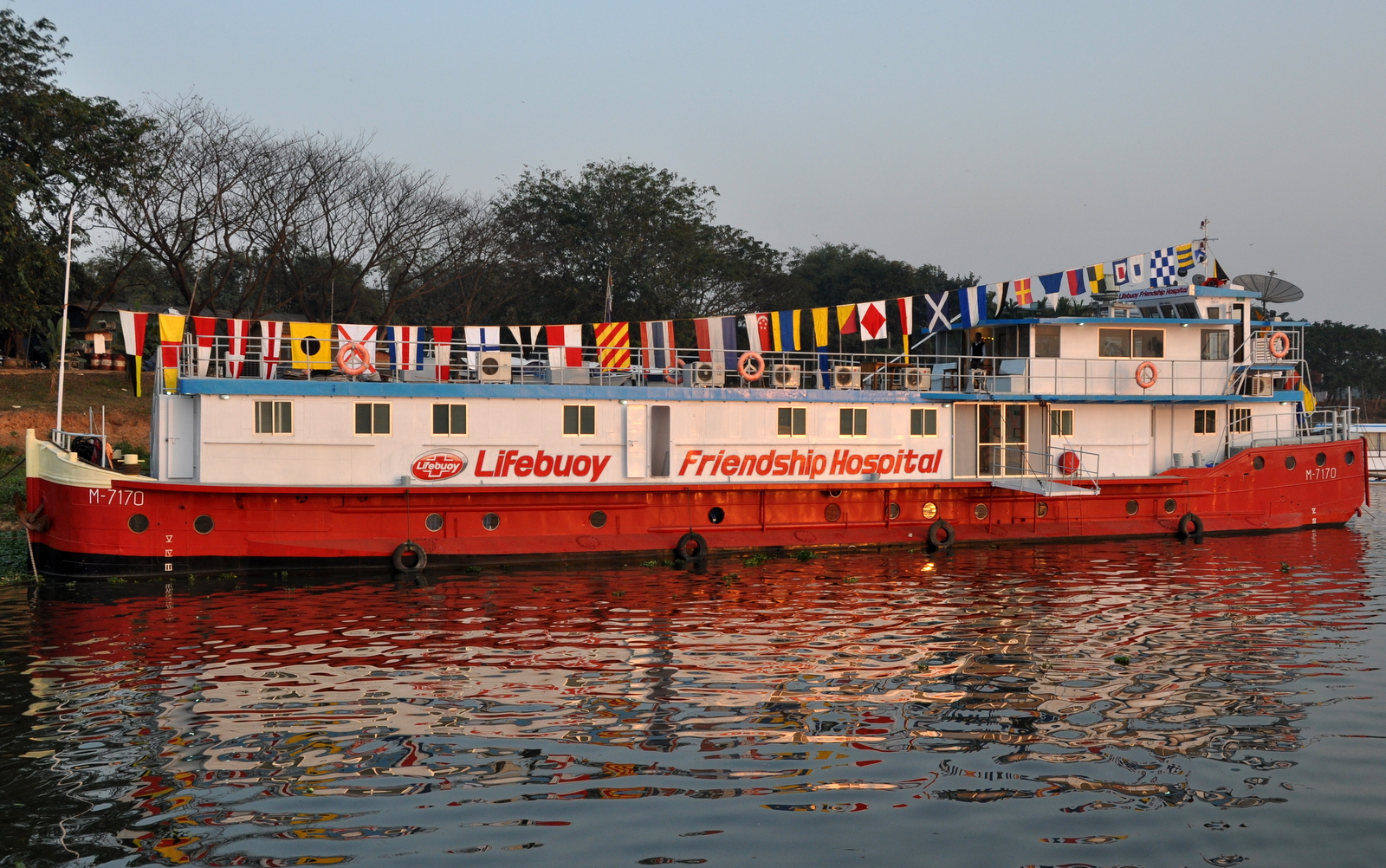
Lifebuoy Friendship Hospital

In 1994, Yves Marre sailed his barge from France to Bangladesh. There, he and his wife, Runa Khan, founded an NGO called Friendship to provide health care in the area. They converted the barge into a hospital to provide healthcare to isolated people in the north of Bangladesh.

=== 2004 to 2012 ===
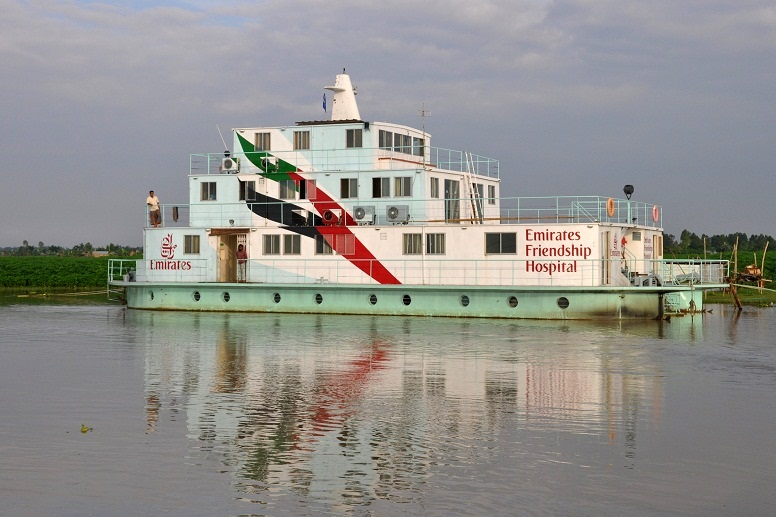
Emirates Friendship Hospital, built by Taratari

In 2004, Marre founded the Taratari shipyard for Friendship's needs, aiming to build a second floating hospital and two ambulance catamarans with fiberglass. The catamaran "Emirates Friendship Hospital" was inaugurated in 2008.

In 2004 Marre also met Marc Van Peteghem, co-director of the naval architecture agency VPLP. This gave rise to numerous collaborations, including the NGO Watever. Van Peteghem designed a floating ambulance for Taratari, which was produced in two units to support the "Lifebuoy Friendship Hospital" and the "Emirates Friendship Hospital". Van Peteghem also helped Marre design the first fiberglass prototype of a "Masdoris", a traditionally-shaped fishing boat from Kuakata, Bangladesh. These new boats were safer and more sustainable than wooden ones, with a lifetime of more than 20 years.

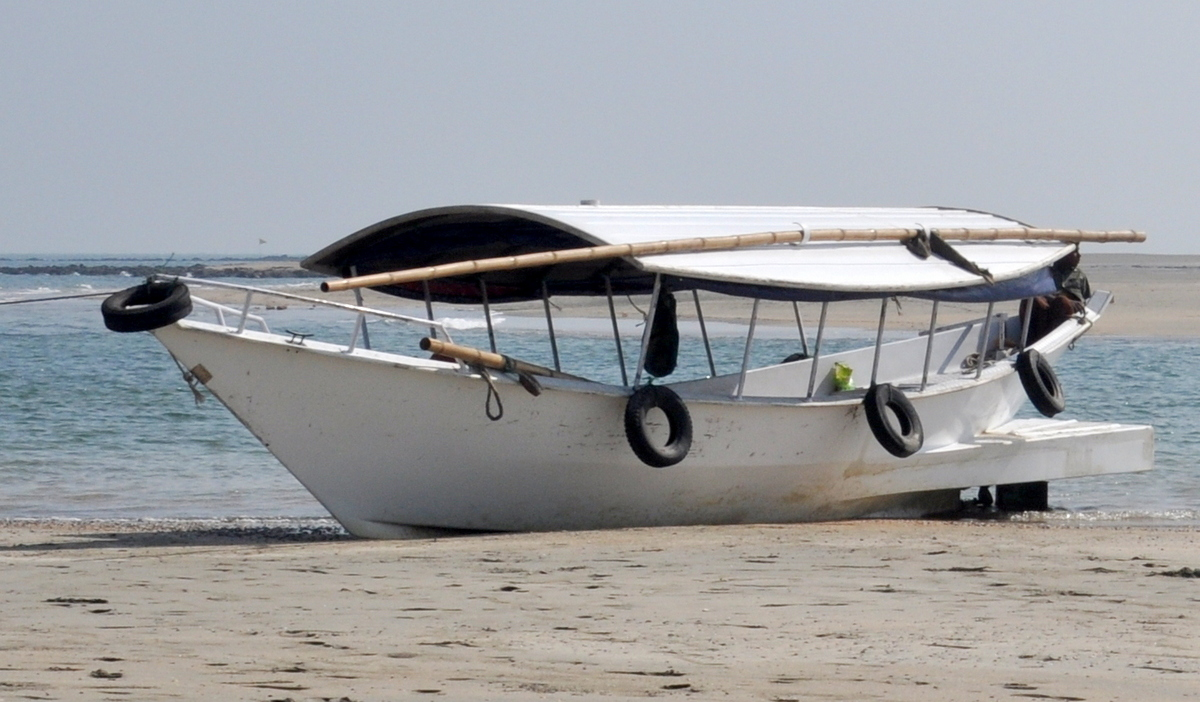
Mandoris from Taratari

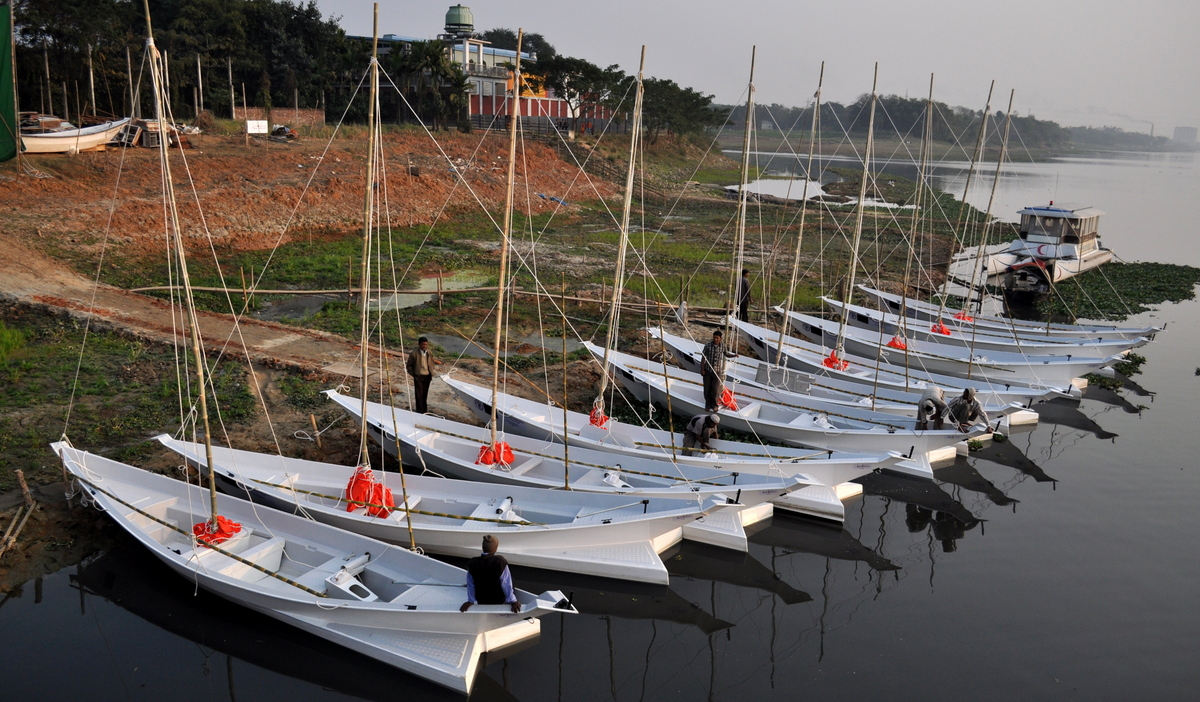
Masdoris from Taratari for the FAO

In 2010, Taratari convinced the Food and Agriculture Organization of the United Nations, the FAO, of the need to improve and renovate traditional Bengali boats. The organization put the shipyard in charge of the production of the first 25 of the country's fishing boats made of fiberglass. With the delivery of 35 more units to the FAO in 2012, Taratari also trained fishermen in the use of the new boats.

In 2011, UNICEF ordered 7 transport boats of the "Mandoris" type for carrying children from the islands of Kaptai Lake to school. These boats have transported over 7,000 children per year.

=== 2012 to 2013 ===
In 2012, Taratari shipyard moved to Chittagong to increase its production capacity and to be closer to the sailors in the Bay of Bengal. The shipyard continued working with the FAO, developed new vessels for the A.K. Khan company, and started new projects. The company built Bangladesh's first jute fiber boat.

=== Future ===
In 2014, a partnership with a local industrial group is expected. This collaboration triple the shipyard's total area, and enable it to continue research and development of new boats.

== Activities ==
Taratari is the only shipyard in Bangladesh to both design and produce its vessels, to train its teams in shipbuilding by international standards, and to regulate the use of composite materials, steel, and wood.

=== Ship design ===
Taratari develops new watercraft based on local needs, taking into account the geographical characteristics of the country and integrating local naval architecture in ship design.

The shipyard also supports local, innovative projects in the water industry. This has included hosting the "Gold of Bengal" team as they built prototype boats made of jute fiber.

=== Ship production ===
Taratari mainly produces and services boats made of composite materials. The first released boat made of steel was the hospital catamaran Emirates. The shipyard is also involved in reconstructing older, wooden ships to preserve Bangladesh's naval heritage, such as the Malar, Panchi, Patham, great Shampan, Baich, and small Shampan boats.

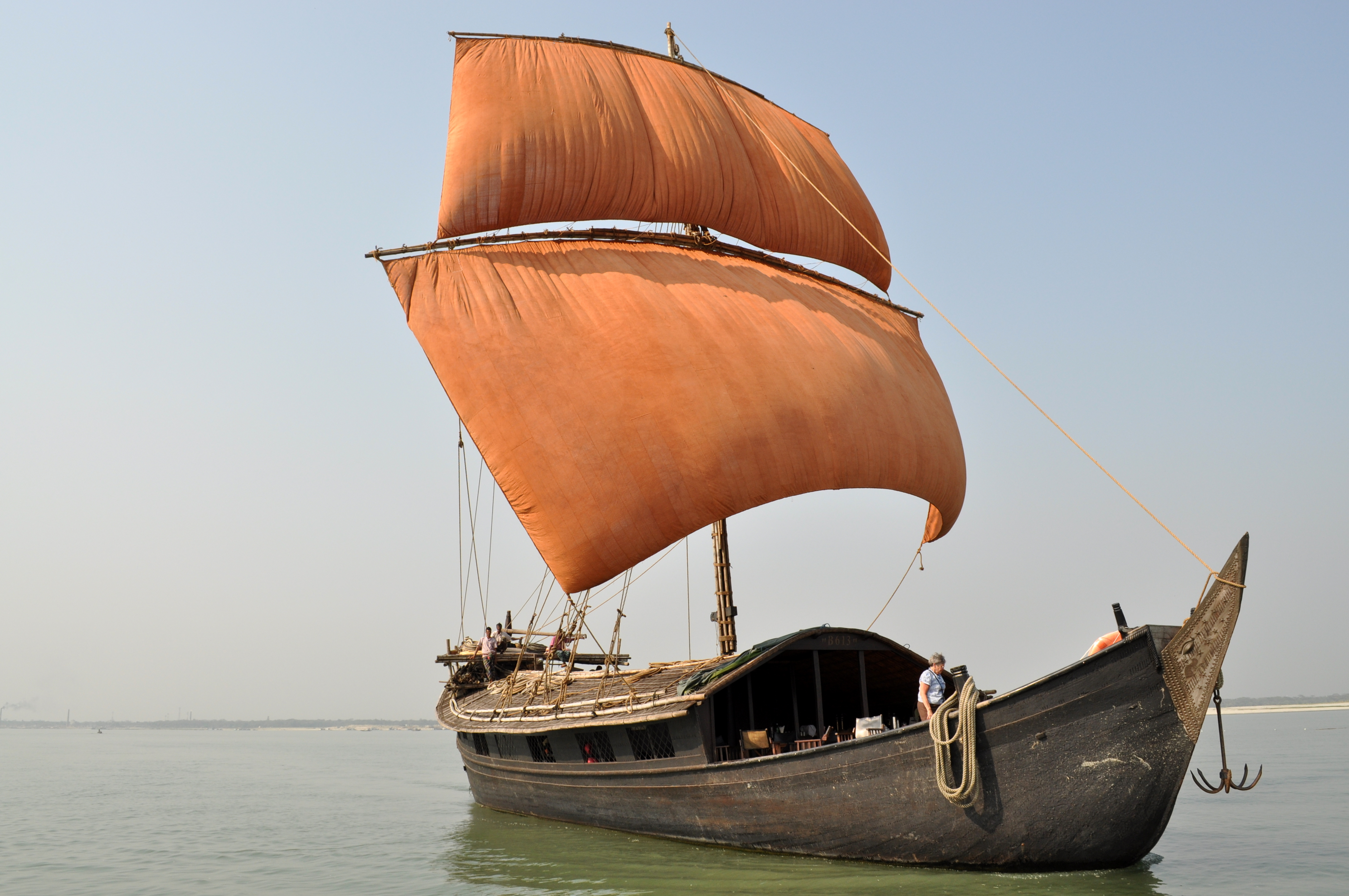
The "B613"

It also builds prototypes of ships and designs and manufactures molds for industrial production.

=== Training ===
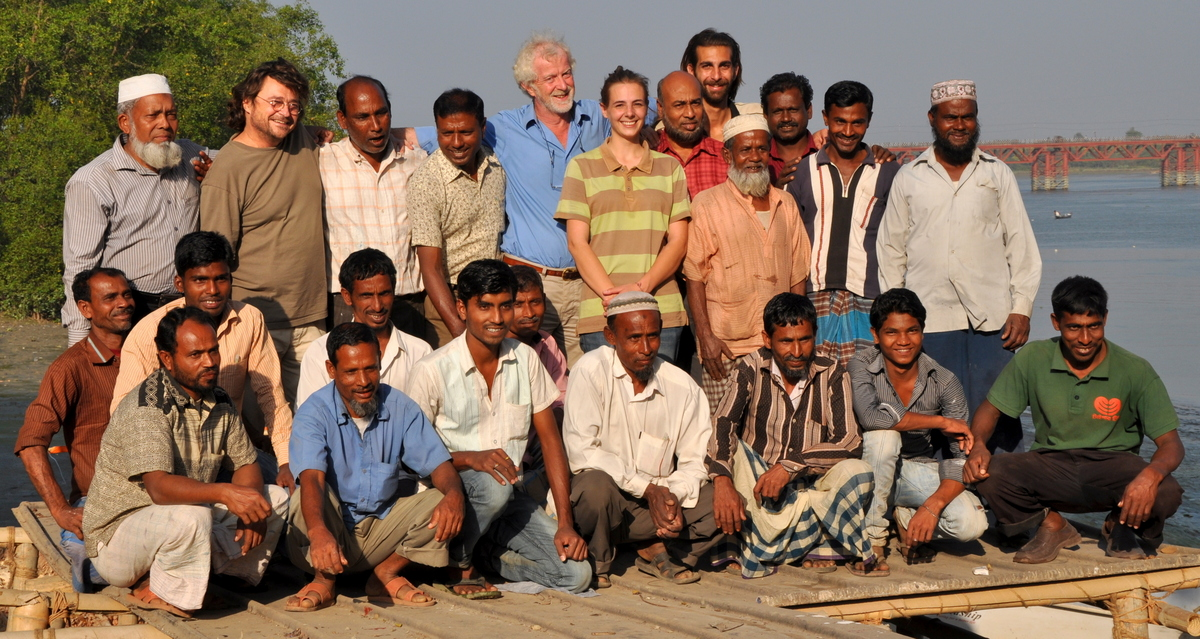
Team Taratari with trainees during FAO session

Taratari trains technicians in Bangladesh at the Regional Training Center. They provide them training in automobile repair, electrics, welding, and tailoring.

In 2013, Taratari, in association with F.A.O. and Watever, organized the training of 15 students in composite ship repair.

== Boats ==
=== Transport ===
- Mandoris
- Shampans: 5m, 7m, and 11m

=== Fishing ===
- Masdoris
- Karnaphuli Boat

=== Medical ===
- Hospital catamaran: The Emirates Friendship Hospital (steel)
- Ambulance catamarans (fiberglass)

=== Polyvalent ===
- Karnaphuli-Multi

== Partners ==
- NGO Watever: Since 2011, the association has sent 6 volunteers to the shipyard. It provides technical expertise in the construction of boats and supports the shipyard in communication and fundraising.
- VPLP: The shipyard and VPLP collaborate in the development of Floating Solutions.
- "L'aventure Tara Tari": In 2009, Corentin de Chatelperron arrived at Chittagong to work on the shipyard's development. In 2010, Taratari helped him in the construction of this boat made of 40% jute fiber.
- Gold of Bengal: In 2013, the shipyard welcomed back Corentin de Chatelperron and his Gold of Bengal team as they built their prototype ship made of 100% jute fiber.
