= Lagoon 50 =

Sailboat class

Development
- Designer: Van Peteghem/Lauriot-Prevost; Patrick le Quément; Nauta Design
- Location: France
- Year: 2018
- Builder: Lagoon Catamaran
- Role: Cruiser
- Name: Lagoon 50

Boat
- Displacement: 43,995 lb (19,956 kg)
- Draft: 4.59 ft (1.40 m)

Hull
- Type: catamaran
- Construction: fiberglass
- LOA: 48.39 ft (14.75 m)
- LWL: 46.95 ft (14.31 m)
- Beam: 26.57 ft (8.10 m)
- Engine: Two Yanmar 4JH57 57 hp (43 kW) diesel engines with saildrives

Hull appendages
- Keel: twin keels
- Rudder: spade-type rudders

Rig
- Rig type: Bermuda rig

Sails
- Sailplan: fractional rigged sloop
- Mainsail area: 1,053 sq ft (97.8 m^{2})
- Jib/genoa area: 649 sq ft (60.3 m^{2})
- Gennaker area: 2,582 sq ft (239.9 m^{2})
- Other sails: code 0: 1,259 sq ft (117.0 m^{2})
- Upwind sail area: 1,702 sq ft (158.1 m^{2})
- Downwind sail area: 3,636 sq ft (337.8 m^{2})

The Lagoon 50 is a French sailboat that was designed by Van Peteghem/Lauriot-Prevost with the exterior design by Patrick le Quément and interior design by Nauta Design. It was intended as a cruiser and also for the yacht charter role and first built in 2018.

The design won a number of awards, including British Yachting Awards Multihull of The Year Award 2018, 2018 and the Sail Magazine's Best Boat of The Year Award for 2019.

== Production ==
The design was built by Lagoon catamaran in France, from 2018 to 2021, but it is now out of production. It was replaced in the product line by the Lagoon 51.

== Design ==
The Lagoon 50 is a recreational catamaran, built predominantly of vacuum infused polyester fiberglass, with wood trim. The design is solid fiberglass below the waterline, with a balsa core above the waterline and in the deck. It has a fractional sloop rig, with a deck-stepped mast, a single set of swept diamond spreaders and aluminum spars with 1X19 stainless steel wire rigging. The hulls have plumb stems, reverse transoms with swimming platforms, a boat lift, dual internally mounted spade-type rudders controlled by a wheel on a flying bridge and twin fixed fin keels. It displaces 43,995 lb (19,956 kg).

The boat has a draft of 4.59 ft (1.40 m) with the standard twin keels.

The boat is fitted with twin Japanese Yanmar 4JH57 diesel engines of 57 or 80 hp (43 or 60 kW) for docking and maneuvering. The fuel tank holds 275 U.S. gallons (1,040 L; 229 imp gal) and the fresh water tank has a capacity of 127 U.S. gallons (480 L; 106 imp gal).

The design could be fitted with three to six cabins, with sleeping accommodation for six to 12 people. Each cabin is provided with a private head. Seating is provided in the main salon, the aft cockpit lounge and a settee forward of the coach house. The galley is located on the port side, aft in the main salon. The galley is L-shaped and is equipped with a four-burner stove, a refrigerator, freezer and a double sink. A navigation station is opposite the galley, on the starboard side. Cabin maximum headroom is 8.17 ft (249 cm).

For sailing downwind the design may be equipped with an asymmetrical spinnaker of 2,582 sq ft (239.9 m^{2}) or a code 0 of 1,259 sq ft (117.0 m^{2}).

== Operational history ==
A catamaranreviews.com review concluded, "Lagoon 50 catamaran is an appreciable option for someone who wants to settle somewhere between the Lagoon 52 and Lagoon 450.The Lagoon 50 particularly wins because of the generous amount of volume and room it offers which grants enough privacy for a family to be comfortable onboard. The performance has also been optimized by a greater aspect ratio of the mainsail and the moving of the mast further aft. All in all, Lagoon 50 does justice to the price tag it comes with."

In a 2018 review for boats.com, Zuzana Prochazka wrote, "with 1700 square feet of upwind sail area between the standard full batten mainsail and an 87 percent self-tacking jib, our test boat was not under-canvased. The mast, which was moved aft to prevent hobby-horsing, is 87’ high giving this cat a higher aspect ratio rig to catch the wind up in the rigging. With 12-16 knots of true wind off South Beach in Miami, we had some lumpy seas. We sailed at 5.1 knots at 60 degrees of the wind and that bumped up to 7.4 knots as we cracked off to 140 degrees. The Lagoon 50 displaces nearly 46,000 pounds dry. To get the most out of her, you'll want to opt for the Code 0 that briefly delivered 11.4 knots on a beam reach."

In a 2018 review in Cruising World, Mark Pillsbury wrote, "Lagoon has bigger boats in its range, but they're designed with a captain and crew in mind. The 50 is meant for the owner and mates who’ve outgrown their 45-footer but still want to go off voyaging on their own, and can do so thanks to a networked plotter and autopilot, a bow thruster, a self-tacking jib and power winches."

== See also ==
- List of multihulls
- List of sailing boat types
