= Runa Khan =

Runa Khan may refer to:

- Runa Khan (actress), a bangladeshi actress
- Runa Khan (entrepreneur), a bangladeshi entrepreneur
