= Lagoon 46 =

Sailboat class

Development
- Designer: Van Peteghem/Lauriot-Prevost; Patrick le Quément; Nauta Design
- Location: France
- Year: 2019
- Builder: Lagoon Catamaran
- Role: Cruiser
- Name: Lagoon 46

Boat
- Displacement: 34,767 lb (15,770 kg)
- Draft: 4.43 ft (1.35 m)

Hull
- Type: catamaran
- Construction: fiberglass
- LOA: 45.90 ft (13.99 m)
- LWL: 45.51 ft (13.87 m)
- Beam: 26.12 ft (7.96 m)
- Engine: Two Yanmar 4JH45 45 hp (34 kW) diesel engines

Hull appendages
- Keel: twin keels
- Rudder: spade-type rudders

Rig
- Rig type: Bermuda rig

Sails
- Sailplan: fractional rigged sloop
- Mainsail area: 866 sq ft (80.5 m^{2}) (square topped)
- Jib/genoa area: 500 sq ft (46 m^{2})
- Other sails: code 0: 1,184 sq ft (110.0 m^{2})
- Upwind sail area: 1,507 sq ft (140.0 m^{2})
- Downwind sail area: 2,148 sq ft (199.6 m^{2})

The Lagoon 46 is a French sailboat that was designed by Van Peteghem/Lauriot-Prevost with the exterior design by Patrick le Quément and interior design by Nauta Design. It was intended as a cruiser, as well as for employment in the yacht charter industry and first built in 2019.

== Production ==
The design has been built by Lagoon catamaran in France since 2019 and it remained in production in 2023.

The boat replaced the 2014 Lagoon 450 in the company product line.

== Design ==
The Lagoon is a recreational catamaran, built predominantly of vacuum infused polyester fiberglass, with wood trim. The design is solid fiberglass below the waterline, with a balsa core above the waterline and in the deck. It has a fractional sloop rig, with a deck-stepped mast, a single set of swept diamond spreaders and aluminum spars with 1X19 stainless steel wire rigging. The hulls have plumb stems, reverse transoms with swimming platforms, dual internally mounted spade-type rudders controlled by a wheel located on a flying bridge and twin fixed fin keels. It displaces 34,767 lb (15,770 kg).

The boat has a draft of 4.43 ft (1.35 m) with the standard twin keels.

The boat is fitted with twin Japanese Yanmar 4JH45 diesel engines of 45 or 57 hp (34 or 43 kW) powering saildrives, for docking and maneuvering. The fuel tank holds 275 U.S. gallons (1,040 L; 229 imp gal) and the fresh water tank has a capacity of 159 U.S. gallons (600 L; 132 imp gal).

The design has sleeping accommodation for six to eight people in three or four cabins. The "owner's" interior has a suit in the starboard hull, with a double island berth aft, a lounge area amidships and large head in the hull bow. The port hull has two cabins, one fore and one aft, with two private heads amidships. The four cabin "charter" version has the same two cabin layout in each hull. The galley is located on the port side of the main salon. The galley is J-shaped and is equipped with a four-burner stove, a refrigerator, freezer and a double sink. A navigation station is forward the galley, on the port side of the main salon. The salon also has an L-shaped settee. There is additional seating in the aft cockpit lounge, forward of the coach house and on the flying bridge. Cabin maximum headroom is 6.50 ft (198 cm).

For sailing downwind the design may be equipped with a code 0 sail of 1,184 sq ft (110.0 m^{2}).

== Operational history ==
In a 2021 Sail Magazine review, Zuzana Prochazka wrote, "when developing its new 46-footer, Lagoon had two issues to contend with. First, the immense popularity of its recently introduced groundbreaking 50 set high expectations for the smaller design. The question, therefore, became how to pack all of the 50's innovative features onto a more compact platform. Second, since the 46 replaces the immensely successful Lagoon 450, Lagoon couldn't afford a misstep. With nearly 800 units of its predecessor having launched, it was imperative that it get the new design right."

In a 2019 review for Cruising World, Mark Pillsbury wrote, "underway, the flybridge on the 46 is the place to be. The boat we sailed had a hard Bimini top for shade (a canvas one is an option) and lots of cushioned lounging space just aft of the wheel. Offset to port, the winches are close at hand for the skipper, and all sail control lines lead to them. On the hook or dock, if you're looking for sun and quiet, there's a small cockpit forward by the trampoline. A much larger and more spacious social area is aft, shaded by the flybridge. The cockpit sports a couch across the transom and a table with foldout leaves and L-shaped seating forward, to port. Opposite, there's more room for lounging on a wide daybed."

== See also ==
- List of multihulls
- List of sailing boat types
