= Lagoon 51 =

Sailboat class

Development
- Designer: Van Peteghem/Lauriot-Prevost; Patrick le Quément; Nauta Design
- Location: France
- Year: 2021
- Builder: Lagoon Catamaran
- Role: Cruiser

Boat
- Displacement: 43,903 lb (19,914 kg)
- Draft: 4.59 ft (1.40 m)

Hull
- Type: catamaran
- Construction: fiberglass
- LOA: 50.36 ft (15.35 m)
- LWL: 46.95 ft (14.31 m)
- Beam: 26.57 ft (8.10 m)
- Engine: Two Yanmar 4JH80 80 hp (60 kW) diesel engines with saildrives

Hull appendages
- Keel: twin keels
- Rudder: Twin spade-type rudders

Rig
- Rig type: Bermuda rig

Sails
- Sailplan: fractional rigged sloop
- Mainsail area: 1,044 sq ft (97.0 m^{2})
- Jib/genoa area: 570 sq ft (53 m^{2})
- Other sails: square-topped mainsail: 1,076 sq ft (100.0 m^{2}) code 0: 1,087 sq ft (101.0 m^{2})
- Upwind sail area: 1,615 sq ft (150.0 m^{2})
- Downwind sail area: 2,131 sq ft (198.0 m^{2})

The Lagoon 51 is a French sailboat that was designed by Van Peteghem/Lauriot-Prevost with the exterior design by Patrick le Quément and interior design by Nauta Design. It was intended as a cruiser for private ownership, as well as for the yacht charter role. It was first built in 2021.

== Production ==
The design has been built by Lagoon catamaran in France, since 2021 and remained in production in 2023.

The boat replaced the 2018 Lagoon 50 in the company product line.

== Design ==
The Lagoon 51 is a recreational catamaran, built predominantly of vacuum infused polyester fiberglass, with wood trim. The design is solid fiberglass below the waterline, with a balsa core above the waterline and in the deck. It has a fractional sloop rig, with a deck-stepped mast, two sets of swept diamond spreaders and aluminum spars with stainless steel wire rigging. The hulls have plumb stems, extended reverse transoms with swimming platforms, a central dinghy lift, dual internally mounted spade-type rudders controlled by a wheel on a flying bridge and twin fixed fin keels. It displaces 43,903 lb (19,914 kg).

The boat has a draft of 4.59 ft (1.40 m) with the standard twin keels.

The boat is fitted with twin Japanese Yanmar 4JH80 diesel engines of 80 hp (60 kW) for docking and maneuvering. The fuel tank holds 275 U.S. gallons (1,040 L; 229 imp gal) and the fresh water tank has a capacity of 219 U.S. gallons (830 L; 182 imp gal).

The design has a number of different optional interior configurations, including four cabins with three heads, four cabins with four heads and six cabins with four heads. These provide sleeping accommodation for eight to 12 people. The central main salon has a forward L-shaped settee, with the galley located at the aft of the salon. The galley is U-shaped and is equipped with a four-burner stove, a refrigerator, freezer and a double sink. A navigation station is located on the starboard side of the salon. Additional seating is provided in the aft cockpit lounge, the flying bridge and forward of the coach house. The coach house and bimini top are provided with solar panels providing 2.7 kW of power.

For reaching or sailing downwind the design may be equipped with a roller furling code 0 sail of 1,087 sq ft (101.0 m^{2}).

== Operational history ==
In a 2022 Yacht Style review, Francois Tregouet wrote, "eventually, the wind picked up as we got in sight of the Pyrenees and it was time to hoist the sails. A little trip onto the bimini to help the battens clear the lazy jacks indicates that a less perilous solution needs to be found ... Halyards and sheets all come back to the central helm station with the optional electric winches. From up there, you have an ideal view of the sail plan. Under the Code 0, our speed was oscillating between 7.8 to 8 knots, which was the true wind speed. Admittedly, we were on a heading at 60 degrees off the apparent, but even under genoa, we were pleasantly surprised to exceed seven knots at 55 degrees off the wind."

A Multihulls World review noted, "promising to be more ecological, more accessible and more connected, the Lagoon 51 announced by surprise - or almost - at the beginning of the year is full of promise."

== See also ==
- List of multihulls
- List of sailing boat types
