= Marc Van Peteghem =

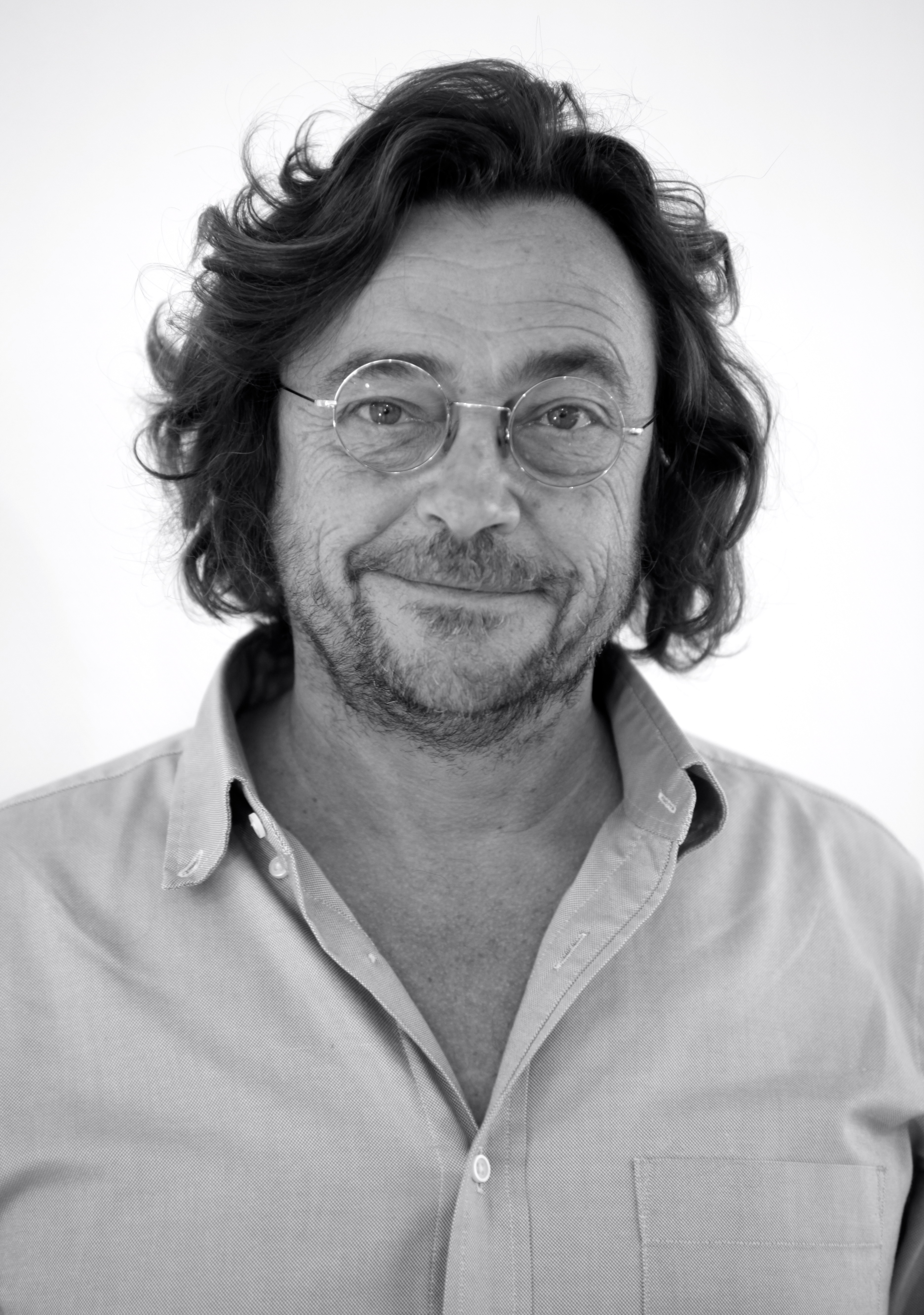
- Born: January 9, 1957 (age 69); Paris
- Citizenship: French
- Education: Southampton Solent University
- Era: Naval architecture

Marc Van Peteghem is a French naval architect, co-founder of VPLP (Van Peteghem Lauriot-Prévost) a French based naval architectural firm, since 1983.

== Studies ==
Born on January 9, 1957, in Paris, Marc Van Peteghem studied at Southampton Solent University from 1977 to 1979 where he became a naval architect. There he met Vincent Lauriot-Prévost with whom he became a friend.

== Career ==
In 1983, Vincent Lauriot-Prévost and Marc Van Peteghem became associates and founded the naval architecture agency VPLP (the acronym of the initials of their names: Van Peteghem and Lauriot Prévost).

Together, they specialize in racing multihulls design. Their first boat is a 50-foot (15m) foiler baptized Gerard Lambert and was the first in a long line of racing trimarans.

In an undated interview Vincent Lauriot-Prévost credits Phil Morrison with the revolutionary idea that they then successfully developed, large volume floats (amas), initially with the revolutionary Poulain for Olivier de Kersauson in 1986.

Poulain's hull similarity to Morrison's Exmouth Challenge design in which Yvon Fauconnier won the OSTAR 1984 is obvious on inspection. The elegant long floats are nearly as long as the hull. Lauriot-Prévost says:

"Because in the meantime, the winner of the OSTAR 1984, it was Umupro Jardin ... (Phil Morrison design, first name was Exmouth Challenge). And the inspiration turns to voluminous amas and as long as the central hull, a radical change. Previously, the amas were sinking into the sea and Phil Morrison was successfully exploring a new approach with his 1982 Exmouth Challenge! On the foilers, the leeward ama did not sink because there was the vertical lift of the foil as soon as there was speed. We did not know all that yet but either we were gaining length at the waterline with a lot of finesse of hull, or we had a small ama with a foil: we discovered the balance sheets issue at all speeds ... With a large ama, we had a better dynamic stability in difficult conditions and we were more efficient in light winds because the foils dragged a lot. Also Olivier de Kersauson wanted to do a program around the world alone: he wanted big amas for security."

Their multihulls became famous and won many victories in races, including the America’s Cup in 2010 and records around the world. Later, this success would Marc Van Peteghem and Vincent Lauriot-Prévost international references in the field of naval architecture.

VPLP also develops yachts such as « Douce France » and « Hemisphere », which are the two largest cruising catamarans in the world. The agency also works with the Groupe Bénéteau to design their cruising catamarans, produced at nearly 3,000 units since 1986, and works with the shipyard Outremer.

In 2004, Marc Van Peteghem meets Yves Marre and begins to work with him on a catamaran ambulance for Bangladesh, built in TaraTari Shipyard. In 2010, he decided with Yves Marre, Alain Connan and Gerald Similowski to create NGO Watever which assists underprivileged populations living on the shores of oceans and rivers. He is the President of the NGO.

In 2012, he co-found « The Sustainable Design School » with Maurille Larivière and Patrick Le Quément, a school of design and sustainable innovation based in Nice.

In 2014, Marc Van Peteghem took part in TEDx Cannes with the talk "Let's reduce our fuel consumption at sea!"

In 2018, Marc Van Peteghem founded AYRO (the predecessor of OceanWings) with Nicolas Sdez and Romain Grandsart. AYRO was set up to invite appropriate and dedicated funding and expertise to tackle the challenge of designing and manufacturing fully automated wingsails for merchant ships.

In 2022, Marc Van Peteghem launches his own winery, Les Oeuvres Vives, in Bandol.

== Awards ==
In 2010, Marc Van Peteghem and Vincent Lauriot Prevost received the Prix Henry Deutsch de la Meurthe from the French Académie des Sports for their life's work.

In 2010, Marc receives the Académie de Marine's Manley Bendall Maritime Personality of the Year Award.

In 2017, Marc receives the Ship Design and Operation Award - Henri Kummerman from the Académie de Marine.

In 2022, Marc becomes a member of the French Academy of Technologies.
