= Gérard Feldzer =

French aviator

- Born: 10 February 1944 (age 82); Aurec-sur-Loire, France
- Education: École des techniques aéronautiques et de construction automobile École nationale de l'aviation civile
- Occupations: Former head of the Musée de l'Air (French Air and Space Museum)
- Employer: Air France
- Title: Captain
- Successor: Catherine Maunoury

Gérard Paul Alain Feldzer (born 10 February 1944) is a French consultant and aeronautical popularizer. He is a former airline pilot, President of Comité régional de tourisme d'Île-de-France (Regional Committee of Île-de-France Tourism) since May 2010, and Vice-Président of Ports de Paris (Ports of Paris).

He has also been Regional Advisor of Île-de-France for Europe Écologie since March 2010 and a close friend of Nicolas Hulot.

== Biography ==
Gérard Feldzer was born in 1944 in Aurec-sur-Loire. He started his career as an airline pilot at Air Algérie (1973–1974) and moved to Aéropostale where he did night flights from 1974-1976. At Air France, he was a pilot on Sud Aviation Caravelle, Boeing 707 and 747 aircraft, Captain (1989–1992) then Captain Instructor (1992–2004) on Airbus A310, A340 and A330.

In 1985, he applied for an Astronaut job at CNES and was one of ten finalists.

He became President of the Aéro-Club de France between 1995 and 2005. The centenary of the club took place during his presidency, and he organized a major exhibition of planes in Paris on the Champs-Élysées to celebrate it.

Between 2005 and August 2010, Gérard Feldzer was head of the Musée de l'Air (French Air and Space Museum) at Le Bourget. He made many animations and creations there including "Planete Pilote" ("Planet pilot"), the first space exhibition in the world aimed at 6-12 year olds.

He co-founded Zebunet (a micro-credit organisation for poor farmers in southern countries) in 2001 and he has been its Vice-President since then. He also founded the "Les ailes de la ville" scheme, which provides training and integration for young suburban people through repairing and constructing aircraft. As Founder and President of the "Transports passion" association, he has organized their annual meetings, exhibitions and events on ecomobility since 2005.

On 1 January 2012, he became an Officier of the Légion d'honneur.

== Media ==
=== Radio ===
Feldzer has had a weekly radio show on France Info since 2009. Recent episodes include Circulez! il y a le monde à voir (Move! there is the world to see)).

=== TV series ===
Feldzer wrote and directed the following series:

- Le Bar de l'escadrille (France 2, 1985)
- Un ticket pour l'espace (France 2, 1990)
- Les allumés du sport (Canal+ 1992)

and co-wrote the transport series Transportez-moi in 2011, which aired on LCP TV in 2012.

He also contributed to several episodes of the French-language dubs of the documentary television series Mayday.

=== Books ===
- Demain, je serai pilote.

== Bibliography ==
- Demain je serai pilote, Gallimard, 1999 (ISBN 978-2-0705-2445-7)
- Académie nationale de l'air et de l'espace and Lucien Robineau, Les Français du ciel, dictionnaire historique, Le Cherche midi, June 2005, 782 p. (ISBN 2-7491-0415-7), p. 212, FELDZER, Gérard
