= Corentin de Chatelperron =

Corentin de Chatelperron, born in Vannes in 1983, is a French engineer, adventurist and manager of the "Gold of Bengal" project.

== Career ==
After general engineering studies of ICAM he worked 3 years in the ecotourism and aeolian sector.

Early in 2009 he went to Bangladesh to work in a modern shipyard producing fiberglass composite boats, the Taratari shipyard. Rapidly he thought of replacing the fibreglass (which is a polluting, expensive and imported material) with jute fiber, a natural local resource.

So as to show the potential of the jute composite and to find partners, he built the sailboat Tara Tari (40% jute fiber, 60% fiberglass) and decided to come back to France on board. This six-month journey at sea, later called the "Tara Tari adventure" was a big success. With several partners, Corentin de Chatelperron launched "Gold of Bengal", a research project on the uses of jute fibre as a composite reinforcement. For 3 years, an eight-person team has been developing this innovation for Bangladesh (research, prototyping, technology transfer). This research project gave birth, in March 2013, to a second boat, "Gold of Bengal" made entirely in Bangladesh with 100% jute composite.

Corentin de Chatelperron is a member of the Society of French Explorer and a scientific consultant for the French Sustainable School of Design.

== Documentaries ==
• «Gold of Bengal, un voilier 100% jute», Voiles et Voiliers 2013

• «Corentin de Chatelperron un pionnier Shamengo», Kaïa Production, Shamengo

• «Je traverse les océans sur un bateau en fibre de jute», Kaïa Production, Shamengo

== Publications ==
«The Tara Tari Adventure», Les Editions Découvrance, 2011

== Awards ==
- Prix Avenir de l'Institut Français de la Mer
- Prix Bernard Moitessier 2011
- Mention speciale du Prix de la Toison d'Or du livre d'aventure vécue 2011
- Prix Aventure du Crédit Agricole de Cosne-sur-Loire 2012
- Prix Pierre Loti 2012
- Prix René-Caillié 2012

== Conferences ==
«Jute do it!», Tedx Paris, December 2012
