= Runa Khan (entrepreneur) =

Bangladeshi social entrepreneur

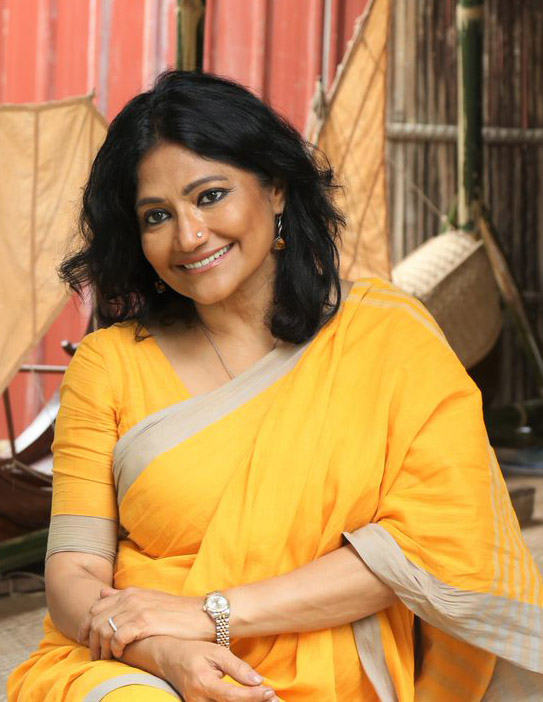
- Born: 17 November 1958 (age 67)
- Education: Lady Brabourne College; Eden Mohila College
- Occupation: Social Entrepreneur
- Known for: Founder, Friendship (NGO)

Runa Khan (born 17 November 1958) is a Bangladeshi social entrepreneur, humanitarian, and author. She is the founder and executive director of Friendship, a social purpose organisation that delivers integrated healthcare, education, disaster response, and livelihood services to climate-affected and remote communities across Bangladesh. In November 2025, Friendship won The Earthshot Prize in the “Fix Our Climate” category—the first time a Bangladeshi organisation has received the award. In 2026, Khan received The Ramon Magsaysay Award for her decades of service to remote, river-eroded, and climate-vulnerable communities in Bangladesh.

Khan is known for an integrated model of development that treats health, education, disaster management, livelihoods, justice, and cultural preservation as interconnected rather than as separate problems to be solved one at a time. Since Friendship's founding in 2002, the organisation has reached more than 75 million people, including some 7.5 million climate migrants it serves annually structured around what it describes as four interdependent commitments: saving lives, climate adaptation, poverty alleviation, and empowerment.

Khan is a member of the Club of Rome, honorary president of the One Sustainable Health Forum approach, country chair and a board member of Global Dignity, and a jury member for the Gulbenkian Prize for Humanity. She was named an Ashoka Fellow in 1994, received the Rolex Award for Enterprise in 2006, the Islamic Development Bank's award for women's contribution to development in 2008, and the Schwab Foundation for Social Entrepreneur award in 2012, among other honours.

Before founding Friendship, Khan worked in tourism, textiles, and publishing. She has since spoken at venues including INSEAD, LMU Munich, and the Collège de France, and is the author of eight books, including six works on early-childhood pedagogy and two collections of Bangladeshi folk tales.

== Early life and education ==
Khan was born on 17 November 1958 into a Bengali family descended from the zamindars of Bengal; her mother's family traced its lineage to the Karranis, the last dynasty of the sixteenth-century Bengal Sultanate. She grew up in a culturally diverse household—her father, Alim Khan, regularly hosted global thinkers, musicians, Zen monks, Hindu priests, Taizé Brothers, and ambassadors, drawing her into wide-ranging discussions on music and philosophy from an early age.

She attended Farmview International School in what was then East Pakistan, and later St. Denys High School in Murree, before earning a BA with honours in geography from Lady Brabourne College, Kolkata, and a second BA in humanities from Eden Mohila College, Dhaka. Decades later, as a working executive, she returned to formal study, completing the Strategic Perspectives in Nonprofit Management programme at Harvard Business School in 2013 and the Leadership for System Change programme at the Harvard Kennedy School in 2018.

== Philosophy and Approach ==
Khan has described her approach to development as values-driven rather than project-driven. In a 2020 interview with Ashoka, she stated that her goal was never to build a large organisation, but to offer effective, direct assistance where it was needed—explaining that Friendship grew out of responding directly to what local communities said they required, rather than implementing a pre-set top-down programme. She has framed the organisation's core values as integrity, dignity, justice, quality, and hope, emphasizing that its strength lies in sustained, long-term relationships with communities rather than short-term project cycles.

“People can live with poverty, but they cannot live without dignity and hope. Much of our work is designed to restore agency and self-respect rather than simply deliver aid.”

— Runa Khan, Interview with Dhaka Tribune (2018)

Dignity is a central theme in her public statements and philosophical framing. She has argued that while poverty is survivable, the erosion of human dignity and hope is destructive, positioning Friendship's healthcare, education, and livelihood interventions as mechanisms to restore agency and self-respect. In a 2023 interview with Initiatives pour l'Avenir des Grands Fleuves, she noted that Friendship's two-decade presence in local communities grants the organisation genuine standing to represent community interests in international policy discussions, rather than speaking on their behalf from a distance. Accepting The Earthshot Prize in November 2025, she dedicated the recognition to the resilience and strength of the climate-vulnerable communities Friendship serves.

== Career ==
=== Early career ===
Khan's work in social enterprise predates Friendship by more than a decade. In 1988, she opened a boutique to provide work for Bihari and indigenous Bangladeshi artisans—an early initiative in sustainable livelihoods for marginalised communities that she later expanded into Mearee, a Dhaka boutique supporting indigenous craftspeople and widening markets for ethnic crafts. She joined her family's printing business in 1992 and founded a security company in 1995. Working in tourism, she co-founded Contic, offering cruises on renovated traditional wooden boats—an enterprise that connected directly to Friendship's later cultural preservation work in saving Bangladesh's boat-building heritage.

=== Founding Friendship (2002–2003) ===
In 2002, Khan founded Friendship, launching the Lifebuoy Friendship Hospital—a river barge converted into a floating hospital serving remote riverine communities—with Yves Marre as advisor and support from Unilever. The following year, the organisation introduced satellite clinics to extend healthcare into Kurigram and Gaibandha, and began systematic work preserving Bangladesh's 3,000-year-old tradition of wooden boat building.

=== Expansion (2004–2008) ===
Friendship's model expanded rapidly through the mid-2000s. In 2004, the organisation constructed its first elevated flood shelter, or plinth, and took part in that year's national flood response, alongside hosting the first national exhibition on the boats of Bengal. A Farmer and Fisherman Training Programme followed in 2005, aimed at building sustainable livelihoods for communities receiving healthcare through Friendship. In 2006, responding to community demand for education on the river islands (chars), Friendship developed a primary school model that trained local community members to teach children in their own villages, and introduced Friendship Community MedicAids (FCMs) to deliver healthcare directly to households. That year, Khan received the Rolex Award for Enterprise for her work preserving wooden boat-building heritage, and Friendship International was established, with Friendship Luxembourg as its first international entity.

The organisation's disaster response and healthcare work deepened following Cyclone Sidr in 2007, prompting Friendship to open women-only adult literacy centres and establish Friendship Netherlands. A second hospital ship, the Emirates Friendship Hospital, joined the fleet in 2008 with support from the Emirates Foundation, and Friendship hosted its first international exhibition on Bengal boats in Paris. Khan was awarded the Islamic Development Bank's award for women's contribution to development that same year.

=== Diversification (2009–2016) ===
Friendship continued to diversify its integrated services: solar home systems reached the chars in 2009 alongside responses to Cyclone Aila, and vocational training centres for weaving and tailoring opened in 2010. In 2011, the organisation introduced an mHealth application to support community health workers, graduated its first primary school cohort, facilitated debt relief for fishermen along the southern coastal belt, began cervical cancer screening in remote communities, and opened the Friendship Centre training facility in Gaibandha—an innovative earth-integrated building that later won the Aga Khan Award for Architecture. Khan was named a Schwab Foundation Social Entrepreneur in 2012 the same year a third hospital ship, the Rongdhonu Friendship Hospital, began operations and Friendship launched its Good Governance Programme.

Solar-powered water treatment plants addressing salinity were installed along the southern coast in 2013, alongside static clinics. By 2014, Friendship had introduced legal-information booths and paralegal services. Char Theatres—community performances addressing social issues—launched in 2015 alongside community-led disaster risk reduction activities and junior secondary schools, the same year Friendship France was established. Khan received the Green Award from Positive Planet in 2016.

=== Institutional Growth (2017–2022) ===
From 2017, Friendship's Transition Fund Project operated alongside humanitarian relief and learning centres for Rohingya refugees. The organisation constructed a cyclone shelter in 2018, co-developed cyclone-resilient housing guidelines with the Housing and Building Research Institute and the Government of Bangladesh, and launched NODI Ltd., a social enterprise. In 2019, Khan launched Friendship Colours of the Chars, Bangladesh's first slow-fashion brand, selling sustainable textiles produced by female artisans in char and climate-affected regions. That year, Friendship initiated mangrove afforestation projects that grew into Bangladesh's largest private mangrove nursery, opened its first retail outlet, and founded Friendship Belgium. During the COVID-19 pandemic in 2020, Friendship delivered emergency relief, opened a primary healthcare centre on Bhashan Char, introduced career guidance services, launched its first centre for persons with disabilities, and opened a pop-up shop in Luxembourg. Today, Colours of the Chars operates three retail outlets (two in Dhaka, one in Luxembourg) and exports internationally. Harvard Business School published an interview with Khan in 2019 as part of its Creating Emerging Markets series.

Friendship marked its 20th anniversary in 2022, inaugurating its first cyclone-resilient house, earning the Royal Institute of British Architects (RIBA) International Prize for the Friendship Hospital in Shyamnagar, and launching a mobile sports library in Rohingya camps in partnership with the Paris Saint-Germain Foundation.

=== Recent Activity (2023–2026) ===
Between 2023 and 2025, five new floating hospital ships joined Friendship's fleet with support from the Islamic Development Bank, alongside two solar-powered villages and two additional centers and disability-friendly boats for persons with disabilities. Students from Friendship's Connected Schools Programme represented their communities internationally: two girls attended the European Parliament and two attended COP28 in 2023, followed by four students at the European Parliament in 2025.

On 11 September 2023, Khan hosted French President Emmanuel Macron aboard Friendship's traditional panshi boat, the Flèche d'Or—the largest of its kind and one of the last still afloat—during his official visit to Bangladesh; the delegation, including climate scientist Saleemul Huq and French and Bangladeshi officials, cruised the Turag River. In November 2025, Friendship won The Earthshot Prize in the 'Fix Our Climate' category, the first Bangladeshi organisation to earn the honour. In August 2026, Khan was named a recipient of the Ramon Magsaysay Award, recognising her decades of work with remote, river-eroded, and climate-vulnerable communities in Bangladesh and her leadership in building Friendship.

== Authorship ==
Khan has authored or co-authored several books, academic chapters, and articles on development, education, humanitarian aid, and climate resilience. Her literary works include two collections of Bangladeshi folk tales drawn from oral traditions: The Flower Maiden and Other Stories (2000) and Rani Kanchan Mala and Other Stories (2000), both published by The University Press Limited; the former received a Bangladesh government award for book design in 2001. Her chapter 'Beyond the North-South Dichotomy' was published in Reimagining Civil Society Collaborations in Development by Routledge in 2023. She has also developed educational materials, including the Play School Activities Book series and Radiant Workbook series, whose child-centric methodology was incorporated into Bangladesh's National Curriculum framework in 1990.

== Speaking Engagements ==
Khan has been an active voice at international forums on climate action, humanitarian response, social entrepreneurship, and value-based development for over two decades:

Year	Engagement and Platform
Climate and Environment
2010	Panelist, 'Innovative Climate Change Programming in Asia,' Asian Philanthropy and Climate Change Forum, Hong Kong
2011	Chair, International Level Sharing Meeting on Community-Managed Disaster Risk Reduction and Climate Change Adaptation, Dhaka
2019	COP25, Madrid — 'Climate Resilient Health: Urgent Need for Policy and Finance'
2021–2025	Speaker and panelist at COP26 (Glasgow), COP27 (Sharm El Sheikh), COP28 (Dubai), and COP29 (Baku)
2024	SB60, Bonn, Germany; Global Forum on Migration & Development
2025	UN Ocean Conference, Nice; Summit, Paris; The Economist fireside chat: 'The Role of Storytelling and Philanthropy in the Climate Crisis'
Humanitarian Response and Migration
2020	National Humanitarian Conference, France
2021	Keynote Speaker, International Dialogue on Migration (IOM); Joint Response Plan Launch Event for Rohingya Crisis (UNHCR)
2024	Learning Planet Festival, Paris
Leadership, Social Innovation, and Development
2012	TEDx Luxembourg City
2013	Impact Forum, Singapore
2014	ADB Transport Forum, Philippines
2015	Convergences World Forum, Paris
2015, 2020	World Economic Forum Annual Meeting, Davos
2016	World CSR Day, Mumbai
2017	Sciences Po, Paris; Printemps Solidaire Rally-Concert, Paris
2018	'Bengal Stream' Exhibition, Swiss Architecture Museum, Basel; Asia Pacific Medical Devices Leadership Dialogue, Singapore
2019	Paperjam 10x6 Conference on Female Leadership, Luxembourg
2021	Guest Lecture, Rotterdam School of Management, Erasmus University
Social Entrepreneurship and NGO Forums
2009, 2012	INSEAD Social Entrepreneurship Conferences
2010	ThinkFest, Singapore Management University; AMCHAM CSR Event, Luxembourg
2011	'Celebrating Social Entrepreneurship,' Delhi Technological University; ALFI Microfinance Conference, Luxembourg; EHP Philanthropy, Luxembourg; IHAN/ISEP Joint Satellite Workshop, Berlin; IAVE World Volunteer Conference, Singapore
2012	Planetworkshops Global Conference, Evian; CIHR Research Planning Meeting, Toronto

== Awards and Recognition ==
The following selected list includes major awards and formal recognitions conferred upon Runa Khan personally or upon Friendship NGO under her executive leadership:

Year	Award / Recognition	Details & Conferring Body	Recipient
1990	Pedagogy Books Curriculum Adoption	Teaching methodology incorporated into National Curriculum Framework	Runa Khan
1990	National Runner-Up Award (Education)	Runner-up for 'Playschool Activity Book 1 and 2'	Runa Khan
1994	Ashoka Fellowship Award	Conferred for innovative teaching methodology in primary education	Runa Khan
2001	Government Book Design Award	Awarded for 'The Flower Maiden and Other Stories'	Runa Khan
2003	Women Entrepreneurship Award	Conferred by Arthokontho	Runa Khan
2006	Rolex Award for Enterprise	For preserving Bangladesh's ancient wooden boatbuilding heritage	Runa Khan
2007	Media Award Bangladesh	Recognising contribution to national development	Runa Khan
2008	Islamic Development Bank (IsDB) Prize	For Contribution to Women in Development (healthcare initiatives)	Runa Khan / Friendship
2010	SCWEC Women Entrepreneur Excellence Award	SAARC Chamber Women Entrepreneurs Council	Runa Khan
2012	Schwab Foundation Social Entrepreneur Award	World Economic Forum / Schwab Foundation	Runa Khan
2014	Social Innovation Leadership Award	World CSR Congress	Runa Khan
2014	Business Excellence Award	Arthakantha & Bangladesh Chamber of Commerce of Singapore	Runa Khan
2014	World Craft Council Award of Excellence	For vocational weaving products from Friendship training centres	Friendship NGO
2016	Green Award	Positive Planet Foundation (expanding solar energy access)	Runa Khan & Friendship
2016	Aga Khan Award for Architecture	For Friendship Centre, Gaibandha (Architect Kashef Chowdhury)	Friendship NGO
2021	RIBA International Award for Excellence	Royal Institute of British Architects (Friendship Hospital Shyamnagar)	Friendship NGO
2022	Inspiring Women Volunteer Award	Jointly awarded by UN Volunteers, VSO, Plan Int'l, UN Women, ActionAid	Friendship Volunteer
2022	IUCN Forest & Landscape Restoration Award	Selected as 1 of 20 best-practice examples in Asia-Pacific	Friendship NGO
2023	Superbrands Bangladesh Award	Recognised in the NGO category (2023–24)	Friendship NGO
2023	Renewable Energy Adoption Award	ESG Business Awards (jointly with Standard Chartered Bank)	Friendship NGO
2023	UNESCO Confucius Prize for Literacy	Conferred by UNESCO for community literacy programmes	Friendship NGO
2024	Reuters Global Energy Transition Award	'Projects of Impact' category for Summit-Friendship Solar Village	Friendship NGO
2011–19	Best Performing NGO Award	Awarded across Gaibandha, Kurigram, and Shyamnagar upazilas	Friendship NGO
2025	The Earthshot Prize	'Fix Our Climate' category winner — Bangladesh's first Earthshot Prize	Friendship NGO
2025	Holy Cross College	Alumnae Excellence Award – Social Development Entrepreneurship	Runa Khan
2025	Prokriti O Jibon Foundation	Channel i Nature Conservation Award	Runa Khan
2026	The Ramon Magsaysay Award	68th Ramon Magsaysay Award	Runa Khan
