= Friendship (NGO) =

- Formation: 2002
- Founder: Runa Khan
- Type: Non profit and non-government organisation
- Headquarters: Dhaka, Bangladesh
- Services: Health, Education, Sustainable Economic Development, Disaster Management and Infrastructure Development, Good Governance, Cultural Preservation
- Key people: Runa Khan (Executive Director)
- Website: friendship.ngo

Friendship is a needs-driven non-governmental organisation that works in the Char islands and riverbanks of northern Bangladesh, the coastal belt in the south, and as of 2017, the Rohingya refugee camps in Ukhia, Cox's Bazar in the southeast. Established by Runa Khan in 2002, Friendship works to empower people through a sustainable, integrated development approach.

Friendship employees more than 1,500 employees that includes field staff, regional office staff, staff in the floating hospitals, teachers at Friendship schools, trainers at vocational schools, organizers and supervisors working in the northern and southern parts of the country and head office staff based in Dhaka.

== History ==
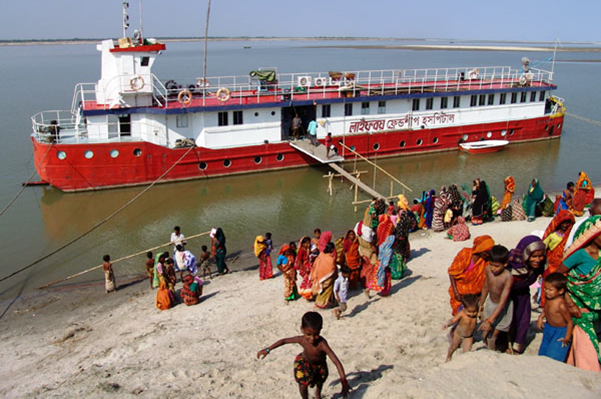
Lifebuoy Friendship Hospital

Friendship's first project was a floating hospital. French sailor and aviator Yves Marre sailed a river barge from France to Bangladesh to donate it for use by the people of Bangladesh. Runa Khan eventually converted the river barge to a floating hospital, the Lifebuoy Friendship Hospital (LFH).

Since then, Friendship has developed a healthcare system to provide primary healthcare and certain surgical procedures to river-based communities who are often difficult to reach from the mainland. The NGO now has introduced two more floating hospitals: the Emirates Friendship Hospital in 2008 sponsored by the Emirates Airline Foundation and the Rongdhonu Friendship Hospital, former Rainbow Warrior II from Greenpeace, in 2012. It has received a donation through the Islamic Development Bank for the operation and construction of five more hospital ships. The keel has been laid for the five new ships in December 2017.

Starting from 2005, a system of mobile Satellite Clinics was set up, complemented by health workers to serve communities at the grassroots level. Presently, each month, approximately 250,000 persons are treated by Friendship's health program.

Friendship also has projects in education, disaster management, good governance, sustainable economic development and cultural preservation. Today Friendship helps about 500,000 people every month.

== Runa Khan ==
Runa Khan is a Bangladeshi social entrepreneur and the founder and executive director of Friendship NGO. Friendship is based on Runa Khan's model of "integrated development," meaning it addresses problems in multiple sectors, including health, education, disaster management and economic development in communities where it is involved, rather than specializing in one of these. Khan won the Rolex Awards for Enterprise in 2006 for work through Friendship to preserve the declining craft of traditional boat building in Bangladesh.

Khan also established a tourism company, Contic, in 1996 which gives tours on traditional wooden boats. Earlier, she wrote text-books for children with the aim of moving away from rote learning, an effort that won her the Ashoka Fellowship in 1994.

== Friendship's work areas ==
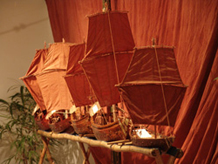
Cultural Preservation

Friendship supports communities mainly in the shifting northern river islands, known as chars, of the Brahmaputra and Jamuna rivers and in the coastal areas of the Bay of Bengal. Friendship is active in 22 Upazilas over 12 Districts of Bangladesh. Today, its operations are most intense and multi-Sectoral in the districts of Kurigram and Gaibandha in the North, and Patuakhali and Satkhira in the South.

== Friendship International ==
Three years after Friendship went into operation in Bangladesh, Runa Khan took steps to set up a network of supporting organisations in Europe. Today Friendship is present in 5 countries in Europe including Luxembourg, France, Netherlands, UK and Germany.

== Training Centre ==
Friendship built the Friendship Centre in the rural flatlands of Bangladesh near Gaibandha. Construction completed in 2011. The building complex serves as a training facility and meeting space for staff as well as the local community who live on nearby riverine islands called chars. The building complex houses offices, meeting rooms, a library, and prayer and tea rooms. The residential area contains dorms for students, staff rooms, and a dining area.

In the training area, visitors sit on the floor for classes and community members in the mostly-illiterate population may watch educational theatre presentations on important issues such as child marriage. Friendship can train up to 80 people at a time in the four classrooms. To generate extra income for the organization, others can rent space at the Friendship Centre for meetings, training, and conferences.

The Friendship Centre acts as a gathering place and refuge for the economically-challenged local population. The building project helped bring international attention to architects and architecture in Bangladesh.

=== Award-winning Architecture ===
Kashef Chowdhury and his Dhaka-based architecture firm URBANA designed the Friendship Centre. The architect promotes "the architecture of responsibility" and wanted to create a structure that was not just art but instead put the client's needs first by creating a suitable environment for the building's uses. Environmental sustainability and keeping within budget were also important to the project. Chowdhury designed the architecture as simple and bare to suit the region's economy and to reflect the serenity of its riverine landscape.

The Friendship Centre is located on a low-lying, flood-prone piece of land, which posed a challenge for its construction. Usually builders in the area will raise structures 2.4 metres above the ground to avoid flooding, but this can be expensive and the budget was tight. Instead, the design called for an earthen embankment surrounding the complex, and a pumping facility for run-off, which helps keep water out at a low initial building cost. Stairs on two ends of the complex lead down to the buildings. Other challenges to construction in the area include earthquakes and the low bearing capacity of the soil.

The nearby ruins of the Vasu Bihara Buddhist temple, built in the third and fourth century, inspired the building's design. The low profile and green roofs integrate the buildings into their surroundings and from the air it appears more like a field than a building complex. The buildings are made from reinforced concrete, stone, local wood, and bricks produced by local craftspeople. The brick construction was inspired by third-century monastic ruins of Mahasthangahr, Bangladesh's earliest example of urban archaeology, and imperfections in the bricks help provide the buildings with texture.

The building complex is divided into two main sections: offices, library, and training classrooms in the outer Ko block and residential areas in the inner Kho block. A series of pavilions face courtyards and pools, and the embankment allows natural light to come in from above with the buildings, corridors, and embankments creating shadows. In addition to greenspace on the ground, the buildings have environmentally-friendly green roofs to act as a thermal mask. Open spaces allow for natural ventilation, reducing heat as outside temperatures vary between 25 and 35 degrees Celsius. The buildings do not need air conditioning, making them sustainable from an environmental perspective and for maintenance and cost savings. Surfaces in the building are mostly unpainted brick which makes them easy to clean and maintain.

The Friendship Centre project won the Aga Khan Award for Architecture in 2016, one of two winners in Bangladesh and six worldwide. The award jury praised the training centre for its use of integrative design to blend into its natural surroundings while reflecting the region's history and archaeology.

The building's simple design has a monastic feel, blurring the lines between architecture, landscape, and archaeology. It quadrilateral layout and brickwork maintain local architectural traditions.

== Awards ==
=== Friendship ===
1. World Crafts Council's Award of Excellence for Handicrafts (2014)
2. Best performing NGO in Gaibandha (2011, 2012–2013) and Kurigram (2012–2013, 2013–2014, 2014–2015)

=== Runa Khan ===
1. Business Excellence Award from Arthokonto and Bangladesh Chamber of Commerce of Singapore (2014)
2. Social Innovation Leadership Award by the World CSR Congress (2014)
3. Schwab Foundation Social Entrepreneur Award (2012)
4. Guest of Honor at the Rolex Awards for Enterprise (2011)
5. SCWEC Women Entrepreneur Excellence Award (2010)
6. IDB Award for Contribution to Women in Development (2008)
7. Rolex Award for Enterprise (2006)
8. Women Entrepreneurship Award by Arthokonto (2003)
9. Government award for best design for the book "The Flower Maiden and Other Stories" (2001)
10. Ashoka Fellowship for innovative teaching methodology (1994)
11. Innovative teaching methodology became part of the accepted system of the National Curriculum Educational Board in Bangladesh (1990)
12. Runner-up in National Award for books on education "Playschool Activity Book 1 and 2" (1990)
