= VPLP design =

French Naval Architect and Yacht Design firm

VPLP
- Industry: Naval Architect
- Founded: 1983
- Founder: Marc Van Peteghem and Vincent Lauriot-Prévost
- Headquarters: Paris and Vannes, France
- Area served: International
- Services: Naval architecture and yacht design
- Website: www.vplp.fr

VPLP Design (Van Peteghem Lauriot-Prévost) is a French-based naval architectural firm founded by Marc Van Peteghem and Vincent Lauriot-Prévost, responsible for designing some of the world's most innovative racing boats. Their designs presently hold many of the World Speed Sailing records.

== History ==
VPLP Design is a French-based naval architecture firm founded by Marc Van Peteghem and Vincent Lauriot-Prévost. These two French nationals first met at Southampton College of Higher Education both having enrolled to study Yacht and Powercraft Design.

During their years at college Marc and Vincent forged a friendship that was later to be the catalyst for VPLP. The company was formed in 1983 and first opened its doors in Marseille with a focus on developing racing trimarans, which was a burgeoning niche market in the early 80's.

VPLP's initial project was to design a racing trimaran commissioned by skipper Vincent Levy for the 1984 OSTAR, (otherwise known as the English Transat). This 50-foot (15 m) foiler baptized Gerard Lambert was the first in a long line of racing trimarans that created a name for the firm and established the young designers as innovators in the field of naval architecture.

This led to Yvon Fauconnier commissioning them to work with Phil Morrison in designing him a new 26 mtr trimaran. Fauconnier had just won the 1984 OSTAR in Umupro Jardin V designed by Morrison and built as Exmouth Challenge. and its more recent history here.

Morrison worked for several months in Marseille with the two French designers at Fauconnier's request and they credit him with creating the idea that they successfully developed, using large volume floats (amas), as long as the main hull on a trimaran, instead of the smaller floats aided by foils that they had used before. This innovative design concept underlies all modern trimaran design because the much larger floats were more efficient.

VPLP designed their first cruising catamaran in 1984 for Lagoon, which was then a division of Jeanneau Techniques Avancées. The Lagoon 55 was the first in more than 240 cruising catamarans designed by VPLP. Lagoon is now part of the CNB division of Groupe Bénéteau and has produced more than 2000 catamarans with worldwide distribution. VPLP are the principal designers for the Lagoon fleet of sailing catamarans.

In 2018, VPLP Design created Ayro to develop and market rigid wings, allowing cargo ships and yachts to reduce CO_{2} emissions.'

In February 2021, Simon Watin, who had been with the agency since 2008, was appointed president, while Mathias Maurios, Quentin Lucet, and Xavier Guisnel joined the new executive committee.'

In November 2021, VPLP Design partnered with Alwena Shipping and MerConcept, François Gabart’s racing team, to develop a 30-meter foil-equipped catamaran designed to carry 200 passengers. The project was named "Fast Foiling Ferry".

== Evolution ==
The offices moved to Paris, Bastille in 1985 to be closer their network of international clients.

In subsequent years, VPLP have structured the organization into three divisions to focus on separate sectors of the yacht market:

- monohull and multihull racing yachts
- series production sailing catamarans
- luxury custom sailing catamarans

In 1996, VPLP opened a Racing Division in Vannes for proximity to many offshore racing teams. In 2008 VPLP opened a Refit and Brokerage Division in La Ciotat, which is a large service center with many shipyards catering for superyachts operating in the western Mediterranean sea.

In 2007 VPLP cooperated with French yacht designer Guillaume Verdier to penetrate the competitive IMOCA racing circuit. The performance of their first interactions Safran and Groupe Bel earned the VPLP-Verdier consortium a growing orderbook for racing monohulls.

== Racing prototypes ==
=== Significant race results ===
Pos	Year	Race	Class	Boat name	Crew	Time	Notes	Ref
Round the world races
1	2021	2020-2021 Vendee Globe	IMOCA 60	Maître Coq IV	Yannick Bestaven (FRA)	80d 13h 59m 46s	with Verdier	
1	2016	2016-2017 Vendee Globe	IMOCA 60	Banque populaire VIII	Armel Le Cléac'h (FRA)	74d 03h 35m 46s	with Verdier	
1 /	2012	2012–2013 Vendée Globe	IMOCA 60	MACIF	François Gabart (FRA)	78d 2h 16m 40s	with Verdier	

=== Custom raceboat significant boats ===
Year Launched	Class	Launch name	Builder	Notes	Ref
2021	IMOCA 60	Maître Coq IV	Yannick Bestaven (FRA)		Became Maître Coq IV

=== Custom racing ===
Since 1990, All of the VPLP boats are still undefeated at the Route du Rhum.

Year	Boat's name	Description	History
1984	Gerard Lambert	50' foiler trimaran	For the Ostar
1985	La Santa Maria	45' catamaran	For the Route de la découverte
1986	Poulain	75' trimaran	Skipped by Olivier de Kersauson
1986	Biscuits Cantreau 1	Formula 40 trimaran	Skipped by Jean Le Cam
1987	Biscuits Cantreau 2	Formula 40 trimaran	Skipped by Jean Le Cam -World Champion 1987
1988	Biscuits Cantreau 3	Formula 40 trimaran	Skipped by Jean Le Cam -World Champion 1988 -World Champion 1989
1988	Hitachi ↓ Bottin	60' trimaran	Skipped by Lionel Péan in 1988 (Hitachi) Skipped by Eric Tabarly in 1989 (Bottin)
1989	Nord Pas de Calais 3	Formula 40 trimaran, Composite carbon nomex	Skipped by Alain Comyn
1989	Groupe Pierre 1er ↓ Lakota	60' ORMA trimaran, Composite carbon nomex	Skipped by Florence Arthaud (Groupe Pierre 1^{er}) -1st in the Route Du Rhum in 1990 Skipped by Steve Fosset (Lakota)
1990	RMO ↓ Primagaz ↓ Foncia ↓ Bayer ↓ Rexona ↓ RegionGuadeloupe	60' ORMA trimaran, Composite carbon nomex	Skipped by Laurent Bourgnon (RMO): -1st in the Open-UAP in 1991 -1st in the Baule-Dakar in 1991 -Mediterranean Record in 1991, 2921 miles - 22h 10min Skipped by Laurent Bourgnon (Primagaz): -1st in the Quebec-Saint Malo in 1992 -1st in the Route Du Rhum in 1994 -1st in the Fastnet in 1997 -1st in the Route Du Rhum in 1998 -Record of Atlantique Crossing in 1999, 7d 2h 34min Skipped by Yvan Bourgnon (Foncia, Bayer, Rexona) Skipped by Claude Thélier (RegionGuadeloupe)
1990	Ylliam	Formula 40, Composite carbon nomex	Skipped by Pierre-Yves Firmenich
1991	Alibi	Mini 6,5 m Monohull Mini-transat	Skipped by Dominic Bourgeois -1991: 3rd in the Mini-Transat
1992	Fleury-Michon XI	60'ORMA trimaran, Composite carbon nomex	Skipped by Philippe Poupon
1992	Charal	90' trimaran, Composite carbon nomex	Skipped by Olivier de Kersauson
1992	Lege Cap Ferret	Formula 28' trimaran, Composite carbon nomex	Skipped by Jean-Louis Miquel
1993	Lyonnaise des eaux Dumez	90' trimaran, Composite carbon nomex	Skipped by Olivier de Kersauson
1993	YG 25	One design racing catamarans, for the Clairefontaine Trophy	
1997	Broceliande ↓ Foncia ↓ Technomarine ↓ Banque Covefi 2 ↓ Stena Sovcomflot ↓ Orange	60'ORMA trimaran, Composite carbon nomex	Skipped by Alain Gautier (Broceliande, Foncia) Skipped by Steve Ravussin (Technomarine, Banque Covefi 2) Skipped by Bruno Peyron & Stève Ravussin (Stena Sovcomflot) Skipped by Stève Ravussin (Orange): -Winner of Nokia Oops Cup in 2005
1997	Sport-Elec	90' trimaran ex-Lyonnaise des Eaux-Dumez, Composite Carbon nomex	Skipped by Olivier de Kersauson: -Jules Verne Trophy record in 1997, 71d 14h 18min
1998	Groupama I ↓ HiQ	60'ORMA trimaran, Composite carbon nomex	Skipped by Franck Cammas (Groupama I): -Winner of Transat Quebec-Saint Malo in 2000 -Winner of Transat Jacques Vabre in 2001
2000	Bonduelle ↓ Gitana XII	60'ORMA trimaran, Composite carbon nomex	Skipped by Jean Le Cam (Bonduelle)
2001	Fila ↓ Tim	60'ORMA trimaran, Composite carbon nomex	Skipped by Giovanni Soldini (Fila)
2001	Belgacom II ↓ Gitana XI	60'ORMA trimaran, Composite carbon nomex	Skipped by Jean Luc Nelias (Belgacom II) Skipped by Lionel Lemonchois (Gitana XI): -Winner of the Route Du Rhum in 2006
2001	Geronimo	110' trimaran, Composite carbon nomex	Skipped by Olivier de Kersauson: -Winner of Jules Verne Trophy 2004
2002	Foncia	60'ORMA trimaran, Composite	Skipped by Alain Gautier
2002	Geant ↓ Vodafone (NZ)	60'ORMA trimaran, Composite carbon nomex	Skipped by Michel Desjoyeaux (Geant): -Winner of the Route Du Rhum in 2002 -Winner of the Transat in 2004
2002	Sodebo	60'ORMA trimaran, Composite	Skipped by Thomas Coville
2004	Idec	90' trimaran ex-Sport-Elec, Composite carbon nomex	Skipped by Francis Joyon: -Solo round the world record in 2004, 72d 22h 54min 22sec -Solo transatlantic world record in 2005, 6d 4h 1min 37sec
2004	Groupama 2	60'ORMA trimaran, Composite carbon nomex	Skipped by Franck Cammas: -Winner of Transat Jacques Vabre in 2007
2005	Crepes Whaou! 2 ↓ Maitre Jacques-Loic Fecquet	50' trimaran, built by CDK Industrie	Skipped by Franck Yves Escoffier (Crepes Whaou ! 2) -1st in Transat Jacques Vabre Multi50 in 2005 -1st in the Route Du Rhum Multi50 in 2006 -1st in Transat Jacques Vabre Multi50 in 2007
2006	Groupama 3 ↓ Maxi Solo Banque Populaire VII ↓ Lending Club 2 ↓ IDEC Sport	105' trimaran, Composite Carbon nomex	Skipped by Franck Cammas (Groupama 3): -Transatlantic Record in 2008 -Jules Verne Trophy, Circumnavigation record in 2010, 48d 7h 44min 52s -Winner of the Route Du Rhum in 2010 Skipped by Armel Le Cleac'h (Maxi Solo Banque Populaire VII): -Record Solo Trans-Mediterranean, 30/09/2013, 18h 58min 13sec -New Record Solo distance in 24 hours, 27/01/2014, 682 miles -Record Solo Route de la découverte Cadix-San Salvador, 30/01/2014, 6d 23h 42min -Jules Verne Trophy record circumnavigation in 2016, 40d 23h 30min 30sec
2006	Lightspeed 32	One design racing/picnic catamaran, Carbon fibre and composite construction in USA	
2006	Safran 2 |	60' IMOCA Monohull, Composite carbon nomex, designed with Guillaume Verdier	Skipped by Marc Guillemot: -Winner of Transat Jacques Vabre in 2009 -Solo North Atlantic Record in July 2013, 8d 5h 20min 20sec
2007	Groupe Bel	60' IMOCA Monohull, Composite carbon nomex, designed with	Skipped by Kito de Pavant
2008	Maxi Banque Populaire V ↓ Sprindrift 2	40m Custom racing trimaran, Composite carbon nomex	Skipped by Pascal Bidegorry & Loïc Peyron (Maxi Banque Populaire V): -Transatlantic record in 2009, 3d 15h 25min 48sec -24 Hour World Speed Sailing record in 2009, 908 miles, Avg 37.8kn -Trans-Mediterranean record, 15/05/2010, 14h 20min 34sec -Jules Verne Trophy record circumnavigation in 2012, 45d 13h 42min 53sec Skipped by Dona Bertarelli & Yann Guichard (Spindrift 2): -Record Route de la Découverte Cadix-San Salvador, 06/11/2013, 6d 13h 42min 53sec"
2009	BMW Oracle Racing 90x90 USA 17	90' full carbon trimaran, Composite carbon nomex	Skipped by Oracle Team USA: -Winner 33rd America's Cup in 2010
2009	Crepes Whaou ! 3 ↓ Fenetrea	50' trimaran	Skipped by Franck Yves Escoffier(Crepes Whaou ! 3): -Winner of Transat Jacques Vabre in 2009 Skipped by Erwan Le Roux & Yann Elies (Fenetrea): -Winner of Transat Jacques Vabre in 2013
2010	Vibrac Paprec 3	60' IMOCA Monohull, Composite carbon nomex, designed with	Skipped by Jean Pierre Dick: -Winner of Barcelona world race in 2010-2011 -Winner of Transat Jacques Vabre in 2011
2010	PRB 4	60' IMOCA Monohull, Composite carbon nomex, designed with Guillaume Verdier	Skipped by Vincent Riou: -Winner of Transat Jacques Vabre in 2013"
2010	Foncia II ↓ Banque Populaire VI ↓ Maitre Coq	60' IMOCAMonohull, Composite carbon nomex, designed with Guillaume Verdier	Skipped by Michel Desjoyeaux (Foncia II) Skipped by Armel Le Cleac'h (Banque Populaire VI): -Finished 2nd in the Vendee Globe in 2012 Skipped by Jeremie Beyou (Maitre Coq)
2011	Race For Water	MOD 70' one design multihull, Carbon composite nomex	Skipped by Stève Ravussin
2011	Veolia Environment ↓ Orion Racing	MOD 70' one design multihull, Carbon composite nomex	Skipped by Roland Jourdain (Veolia Environment)
2011	Foncia	MOD 70' one multihull, Carbon composite nomex	Skipped by Michel Desjoyeaux: -Winner of the European Tour in 2012 -Record of the Tour of Isle of Wight in 2012, 2h 21min 25sec
2011	Spindrift Racing	MOD 70' one design multihull, Carbon composite nomex	Skipped by Yann Guichard: -Winner of Multi One Championship in 2010 -Winner of Krys Ocean Race in 2012
2011	Macif	60' IMOCA Monohull, Composite carbon nomex, designed with Guillaume Verdier	Skipped by Francois Gabart: -Winner of the Vendee Globe in 2013, 78d 2h 16min 40sec
2011	Groupe Edmond de Rothschild (Gitana XV)	MOD 70' one design multihull, Carbon composite nomex	Skipped by Sebastien Josse: -Winner of Transat Jacques Vabre 2013
2012	Oman Sail	MOD 70' one design multihull, Carbon composite nomex	Skipped by Sidney Gavignet
2013	Prince de Bretagne	80' trimaran, Composite carbon nomex	Skipped by Lionel Lemonchois for the Route Du Rhum 2014
2013	Hydros 1 & 2 - Class C	25' Class C catamarans, for the Little Americas Cup, Composite carbon nomex	
2014	Sodebo Ultim	105' trimaran, ex-Geronimo, Composite Carbon nomex	Skipped by Thomas Coville -Winner of the Around the world sailing record the 25th of December 2016, 49 d 03 h 07 m 38 s
2014	Comanche 100	100' Monohull, Composite carbon nomex, designed with Guillaume Verdier	Launched September 2014 Owned by James H. Clark, Kristy Hinze Skippered by Ken Read (sailor) -Transatlantic Record 2016, 5d 14h 21m 25s
2015	Safran 3	60' IMOCA Racing Monohull, composite carbon nomex, designed with Guillaume Verdier	Launched on February 5, 2015, to be skipped by Morgan Lagraviere for the Vendee Globe 2016
2015	Banque Populaire VIII	60' IMOCA Racing Monohull, composite carbon nomex, designed with Guillaume Verdier, Launched on June 9, 2015, for the Vendee Globe 2016, to be skipped by Armel Le Cleac'h	Winner of the Vendée Globe 2016–2017, 74 days 03 hours 35 min 46 s
2015	Edmond de Rothschild (Gitana XVI)	60' IMOCA Racing Monohull, composite carbon nomex, designed with Guillaume Verdier, to be launched in July 2015 for the Vendee Globe 2016, to be skipped by Sebastien Josse	
2015	Vento di Sardegna	60' IMOCA Racing Monohull, composite carbon nomex, designed with Guillaume Verdier, to be launched in July 2015 for the Vendee Globe 2016, to be skipped by Andrea Mura	
2015	Hugo Boss 6	60' IMOCA Racing Monohull, composite carbon nomex, designed with Guillaume Verdier, to be launched in July 2015 for the Vendee Globe 2016, to be skipped by Alex Thomson	
2015	Saint-Michel - Virbac	60' IMOCA Racing Monohull, composite carbon nomex, designed with Guillaume Verdier, to be launched in September 2015 for the Vendee Globe 2016, to be skipped by Jean-Pierre Dick	
2015	Macif (trimaran)	100' Racing Trimaran, Composite carbon nomex, launched August 18, 2015 for fr:François Gabart	-1st Transat Jacque Vabre 2015 double with Pascal Bidégorry -1st Transat Bakerly Ultime in 2016

=== Sport boats ===
Date	Name	Size	Description
2007	Multi 23	23'	Multihull day sailing trimaran, Composite carbon nomex
2013	Diam 24	24'	One Design Multihull sports boat, Composite carbon nomex

== Cruising ==
=== Custom yachts ===
Date	Name	Size	Description
1991	Highest Honour 1 & 2	85'	Twin charter catamarans built in composite by DRA shipyard, in France
1998	Douce France	138'	Schooner rig cruising built in Aluminium by Alumarine France; Wins the 1999 "Most innovative Yacht" award
2001	Freebird One	90'	Day charter catamarans built in aluminium at Gamelin, France
2001	Horizon	50'	Performance catamaran with dagger boards built in composites at Horizon Boats, South California USA
2003	Ciliam (Lago 92')	92'	Custom composite Luxury Catamaran built by Salthouse in New Zealand
2003	Corolian VI (Bis 77')	77'	Limited edition carbon Sailing Catamaran built in Italy
2003	Sunreef	74'	Custom Aluminium Sailing Catamaran Built by Sunreef Yachts in Gdansk, Poland
2008	Sophie	63'	Power Catamaran 'the floating villa' built in composites by JetTern in China
2011	Hemisphere (Gemini)	145'	Custom luxury sailing Catamaran, Largest sailing catamaran in the world, Built in Aluminium at Derecktor, USA & Pendennis, UK
2011	Tosca (Moxie 61)	61'	Built in composite at Jazmarine, South Africa
2012	Mousetrap (VPLP 110)	110'	Custom luxury sailing Catamaran, Built in carbon composite by JFA Shipyard
2013	BBs	35'	Monohull Sailing boat, designed for day sailing "Sailing beach boat"
2013	BBm	40'	Monohull power boat, designed for day sailing "Motor Beach boat"

=== Production yachts ===
VPLP worked on several serial production boats programs, including the Lagoon range from the beginning, The Outremer 5X and the power monohul dayboat Smartboat.Catamarans de luxe | [site:name]

== Experimental ==
Date	Name	Size	Description
1994	Hydroptère	60'	Hydrofoil prototype for Alain Thebault
1997	Hydroptère	60'	The second version has been launched
2001	Hydroptère	60'	The third evolution launched
2004	Hydroptère	60'	The fourth evolution launched: 2006 : Record across the English Channel at 33 knots over 1 nm
2006	Hydroptère	60'	The fifth evolution launched: 2007 : 500m record at 44.5 knots in 500m and 41,5 knots over 1 nm; 2009 : 51 kn Speed record on 500 meters
2008	Siz & Co	32'	Foiler for the Lake Léman
2014	Hy-X	20'	Foiling boat

== Working ==
Date	Name	Size	Description
1995	Waterworld	60'	Trimaran, sister ship of Pierre 1^{er}, Built for the Universal Studios movie in "Waterworld"
2004	Lokeya	40'	Custom Aluminium Fishing Catamaran, Built by Alunox at Saint Malo
2007	Claud'Edith II	40'	Custom Aluminium Fishing Catamaran, Built by Alunox at Saint Malo
2007	Friendship	40'	Water ambulance designed for the NGO Friendship, Built in composite by Taratari shipyard

== Annexes ==
=== Waterworld ===
In 1994 VPLP designed the racing trimaran made famous by the movie Waterworld starring Kevin Costner. Two 60-foot (18 m) trimarans were built at Jeanneau's racing division (Jeanneau Techniques Avancées), one a conventional trimaran capable of speeds in excess of 30 kn (56 km/h) and a second boat with unconventional features that allowed it to transform for certain scenes in the movie and was used for most of the onboard and special effects scenes. This second boat, although used for many of the close up scenes, was able to sail but was not capable of the speeds of the conventional trimaran.

=== Hydroptère ===
In 1994 plans for an experimental Hydrofoil prototype was commissioned for Alain Thebault. The first Hydroptère was a 60-foot (18 m) trimaran. In the following years four additional evolutions were built. In 2006 HYDROPTÈRE 5 was launched. This was the first boat to cross the 50-knot (93 km/h) barrier (51 knots speed record set in 2009).

=== Groupama 3 ===
The prime design consideration for Groupama 3 was for a multihull which can be manipulated by a crew of ten people and not to make then LOA a defining characteristic thus Groupama 3 is not a maxi multihull!. It's a trimaran, which is also heavily inspired by Groupama 2, the 60-foot (18 m) ORMA : with the adoption of foils and the installation of three rudders, with a wide, open cockpit and a proportionally moderate sail plan. As a result, we opted for a relatively small boat which is rather light, progressive and very reactive. The deck plan enables the crew to manoeuvre faster in order to adjust the sail area to changes in condition and hence permanently exploit the trimaran's potential.

As the record programme included above all the Jules Verne Trophy, it was necessary to take into account the `Southern ocean' parameter: the foils are far forward so that the boat is nose up, the freeboard is high to prevent the bow from burying, the height of the mast limits the trim changes. The balance when sailing is considerably safer than on a 60-foot (18 m) Orma."

Groupama 3 was reconfigured for Franck Cammas to enter the 9th edition of the single handed Route du Rhum 2010 which started 31 October 2010. Groupama 3 was the first to finish in 9 days, 3 hours, 14 minutes and 47 seconds. The Route du Rhum takes place once every four years, is a single-handed race across the Atlantic starting in Saint-Malo, France and finishing in Pointe-à-Pitre, Guadeloupe in the Caribbean.

=== Maxi Banque Populaire V ===
Banque Populaire V, the largest ocean racing trimaran in the world, was launched in August 2008 in Lorient (Brittany – France). Built at sites in Cherbourg, La Rochelle and Lorient, the construction of the maxi trimaran took 250,000 man hours of work, utilising a total workforce of some 170 people. Under the leadership Pascal Bidégorry, skipper of the Banque Populaire trimarans since 2004, the crew of the Maxi Banque Populaire V has embarked on a campaign to beat some of the most prestigious ocean racing records.

VPLP designed Maxi Banque Populaire V as a fully crewed, 40-metre (131 ft) multihull for ocean racing and record attempts. Its design requirements included performance, seaworthiness and crew safety. At its launch in 2008, it was the largest ocean-racing trimaran built.[25]

Pascal Bidégorry and his associate Ronan Lucas, the Director of the Team Banque Populaire, sought a design centred on a very specific idea:

“We wanted a big boat which would be able to sail fast safely but with a range of speeds, all that we knew we could master from a technological point of view”. Pascal Bidégorry skipper of Maxi Banque Populaire V.

=== BMW Oracle BOR 90 ===
BMW Oracle winner America's Cup 33 - Deed of Gift
The 33rd America's Cup was held under a strict Deed of Gift rules: The first team to win two out of three races is the winner of the 33rd America's Cup. It was specified by the cup holder SNG that the match be sailed in yachts 90 ft (27 m) by 90 ft (27 m), and so the Golden Gate Yacht Club developed their trimaran BMW Oracle Racing 90, whilst the Société Nautique de Genève (SNG) have opted for a giant catamaran, Alinghi 5. When it was proposed that the 33rd edition of the America's Cup would be contested with multihulls, BMW Oracle team immediately signed VPLP to their core design team

BMW Oracle Racing 'BOR 90, sailed as USA 17' the American challenger, representing the Golden Gate Yacht Club, won the 33rd America's Cup Match in Valencia, sweeping past the Swiss defender, Alinghi, to a 2–0 victory.

Race one, a windward - leeward course with 20-mile (32 km) legs, saw BMW Oracle Racing's trimaran winning by 15.28 minutes. In race two, a triangle, with 13-mile (21 km) legs, the Challenger crossed the finishing line ahead by 5.26 minutes.

=== Multi One Design MOD 70 ===
A one-design 70-foot (21 m) multihull designed to create a new class of oceangoing racer. When compared to its predecessor the ORMA 60. the MOD 70 is 10-foot (3.0 m) longer, 5 feet (1.5 m) narrower, carries less sailarea with a shorter rig and higher crossbeam clearance. The design concept was to sacrifice some of the ORMA 60's extreme performance for reduced cost, reliability and safety.
