= Westsail 32 =

Fiberglass sailboat

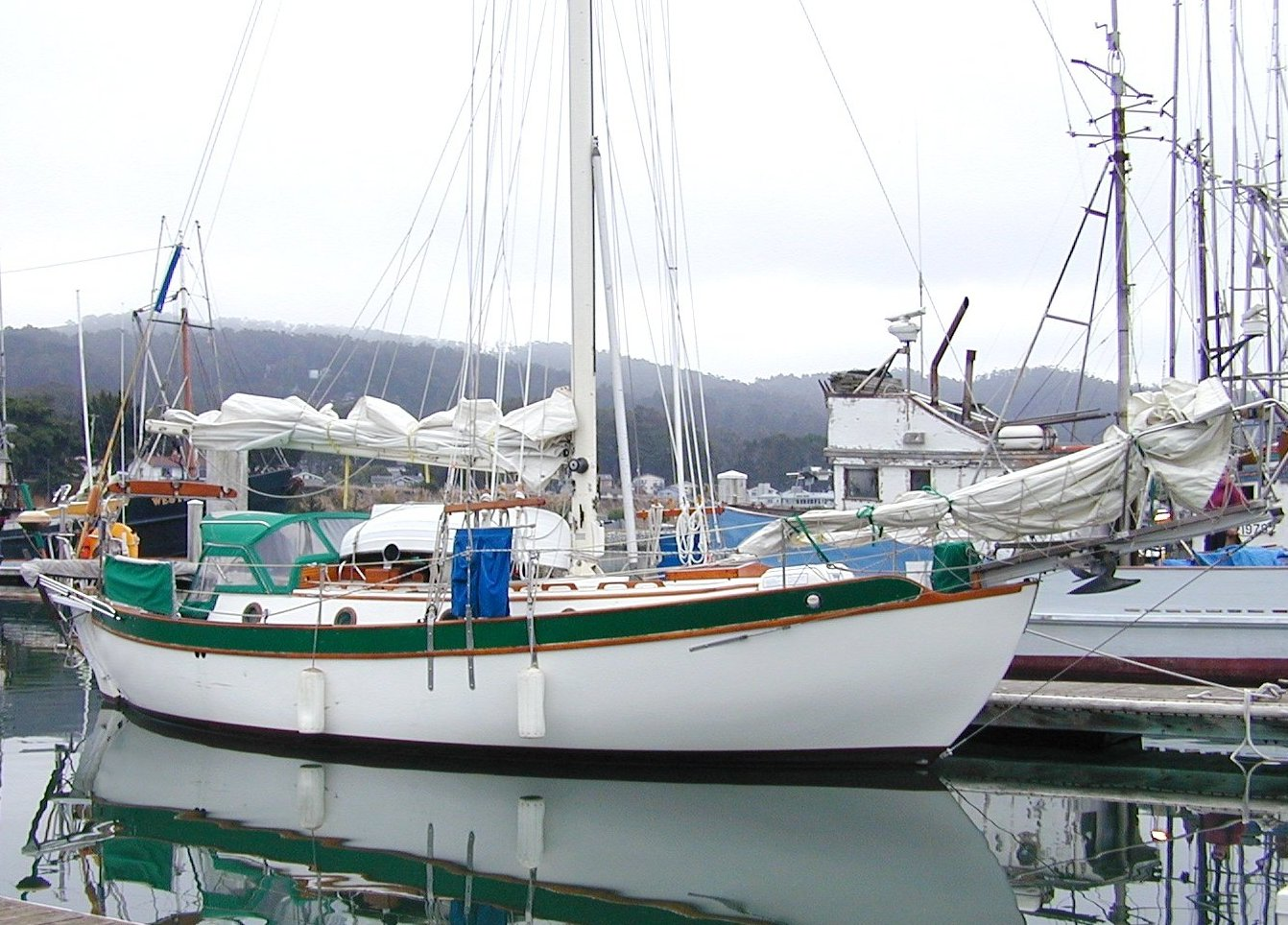
- A Westsail 32 berthed at Pillar Point Harbor, California.

Development
- Designer: Colin Archer, William Atkin, W. I. B. Crealock
- Year: 1977
- Name: Westsail 32

Boat
- Crew: 1 to 7
- Draft: 5 ft 0 in (1.52 m)

Hull
- Type: Monohull yacht
- Hull weight: 19,500 lb (8,800 kg)
- LOH: 32 ft 0 in (9.75 m)
- LWL: 27 ft 6 in (8.38 m)
- Beam: 11 ft 0 in (3.35 m)

Hull appendages
- Keel: Long keel

Rig
- Rig type: Bermudan cutter

Sails
- Total sail area: 629 sq ft (58.4 m^{2})

The Westsail 32 was a production fiberglass sailboat built between the years of 1971 and 1980. Approximately 830 were built, about half of them in kit form. The "W32", as they are often referred to, was very heavily built and has taken many people on trouble-free voyages and several circumnavigations. Often thought of as a slow boat, the long waterline and incredible load carrying capabilities of this vessel make it an excellent cruising boat. The Westsail was directly derived from the earlier Kendall 32, of which only a few were made.

== History ==
=== Origins ===
The Westsail 32 design has a long history. The hull shape is descended from the double-ended pilot and rescue boats designed by the Norwegian naval architect Colin Archer. These boats were designed for extreme seaworthiness in the rough conditions of the North Sea.

The late 19th century Archer design was first adapted for pleasure sailing by William Atkin, who, in 1928, designed a 32-foot (9.8 m) double-ended boat called Eric based on Archer's 47’ rescue boat design. This design was later refined into Thistle, which replaced Eric's gaff rig with a bermuda rig, and has a flush deck. Similar boats made impressive voyages, including the wartime circumnavigation of Vito Dumas in Lehg II, designed by Manuel Campos. An Eric design shot to prominence in 1969, when Robin Knox-Johnston became the first person to sail single-handed and non-stop around the world; his boat, Suhaili, was hand-built in India to the Eric design.

=== The Kendall 32 ===
In 1969, Californian Larry Kendall decided that a boat like Suhaili would make his ideal long-distance cruiser, specially if built in glass-reinforced plastic (GRP). A couple of his friends were also interested, and together they thought that moulding the boats from fibreglass would save some money. Kendall asked yacht designer William Crealock whether there might be a market for a heavily built, long-distance, fibreglass cruising sailboat; Crealock's opinion was that "you might sell ten or a dozen". This was enough for Kendall to go into business, and Crealock set about converting Atkin's Thistle to GRP, resulting in a hull shape the same as the original Thistle. Crealock claimed he did not touch the lines, as they wanted to keep the basic Atkin design. The resulting Kendall 32 was a limited success; the company was short-lived, however, and became insolvent after two years in operation.

=== Westsail Corporation ===
In February, 1971, S. Snyder Vick, a young electrical engineer, and his wife Lynne, bought the moulds for the Kendall 32 from Kendall Yacht Corporation. Kendall and five other employees were hired to continue production. Production started in 1969, beginning by finishing three boats for Kendall buyers for between $15,000 and $20,000 each. Crealock was then asked to design a modified deck layout - loosely based on Atkin's Eric - and interior, and the Westsail 32 was born.

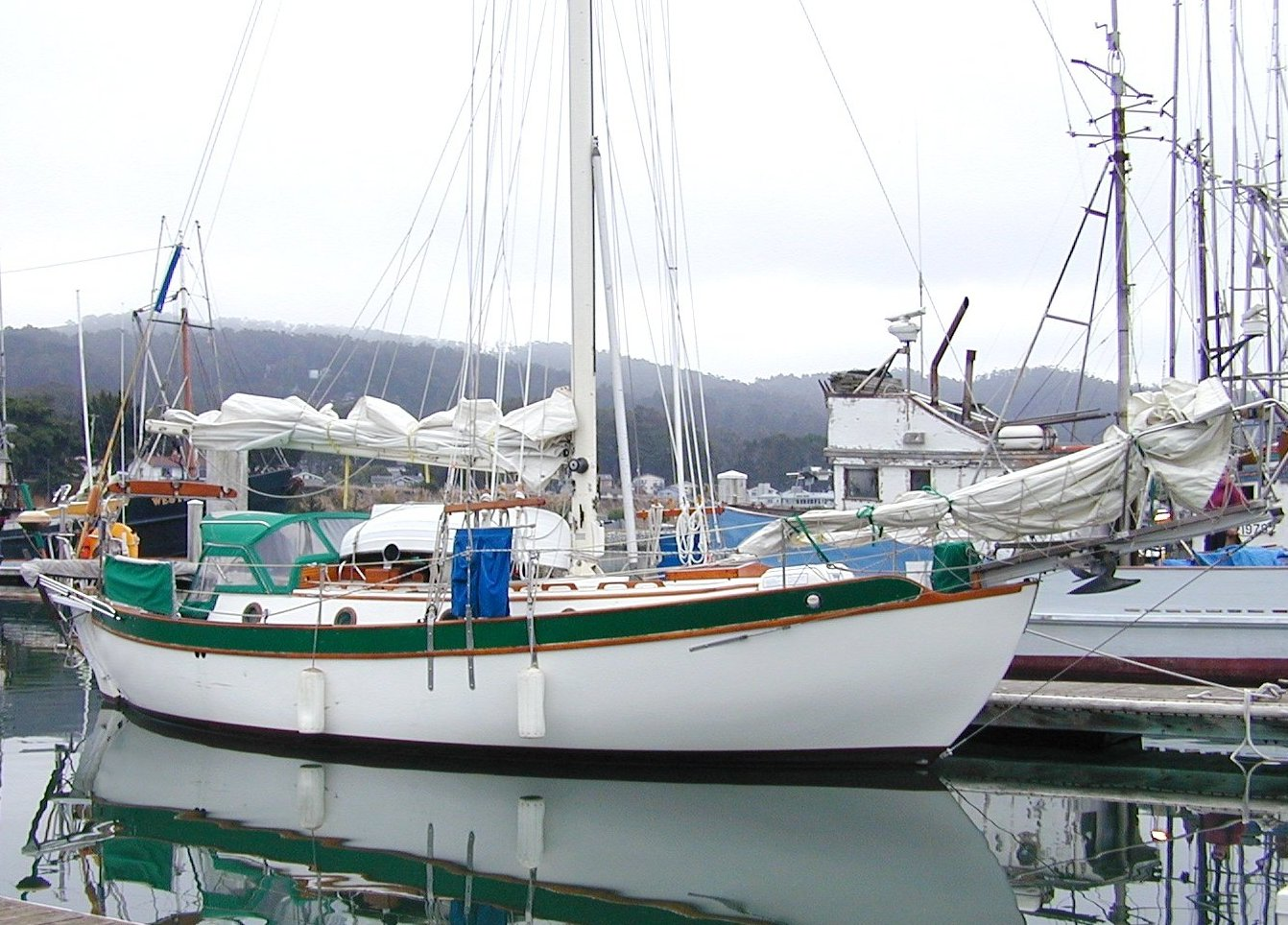
A Westsail 32 at berth in Pillar Point Harbor in San Mateo County, California.

The Vicks put in place a promotional campaign, focusing on the world cruising lifestyle. The dream of buying a boat and sailing it off to exotic foreign locations struck a chord with the public; the company's quarterly magazine, Windbag, was essentially a forum to promote the boat, but had over 5,000 subscribers (all except boat owners paying for the privilege) at one point. Special "Owners' Boat Shows" were held, and owners were recruited as sales representatives.

=== Demise ===
Despite the company's sales success, it never achieved financial success. The usual practice of taking payment for a boat only upon delivery created a credit gap for the company, and this gap grew larger with the booming sales, as the number of boats in production at one time increased. This problem was exacerbated by the announcement of the new Westsail 42 and 43 in 1974; the new boats sold strongly from the preliminary sketches, but the larger boats involved an even longer build time and larger capital commitment. The commitment to deliver boats for a price agreed at the start of production made the company especially vulnerable to inflation in materials costs. In an effort to meet demand while reducing the strain on production, many boats were sold as kits. A book was written to accompany the kit, Ferenc Máté's From a Bare Hull; a later edition of this book is still selling as a popular reference on home boatbuilding. Also see "The Finely Fitted Yacht" by the same author.

The Vicks' business inexperience, and lax production efficiency, meant that despite technically showing a profit, the company struggled to stay solvent. The firm went into bankruptcy proceedings in early 1977. Although the company restarted under new management, the financial problems continued, and Westsail Corporation ceased operation finally in 1981. The firms' achievement remains impressive, however; in just ten years the company built some 830 Westsail 32s (as well as the 28s, 42s, and 43s built), a phenomenal rate of production for such a large boat, and made a lasting impact on the world of cruising yachts.

== Design ==
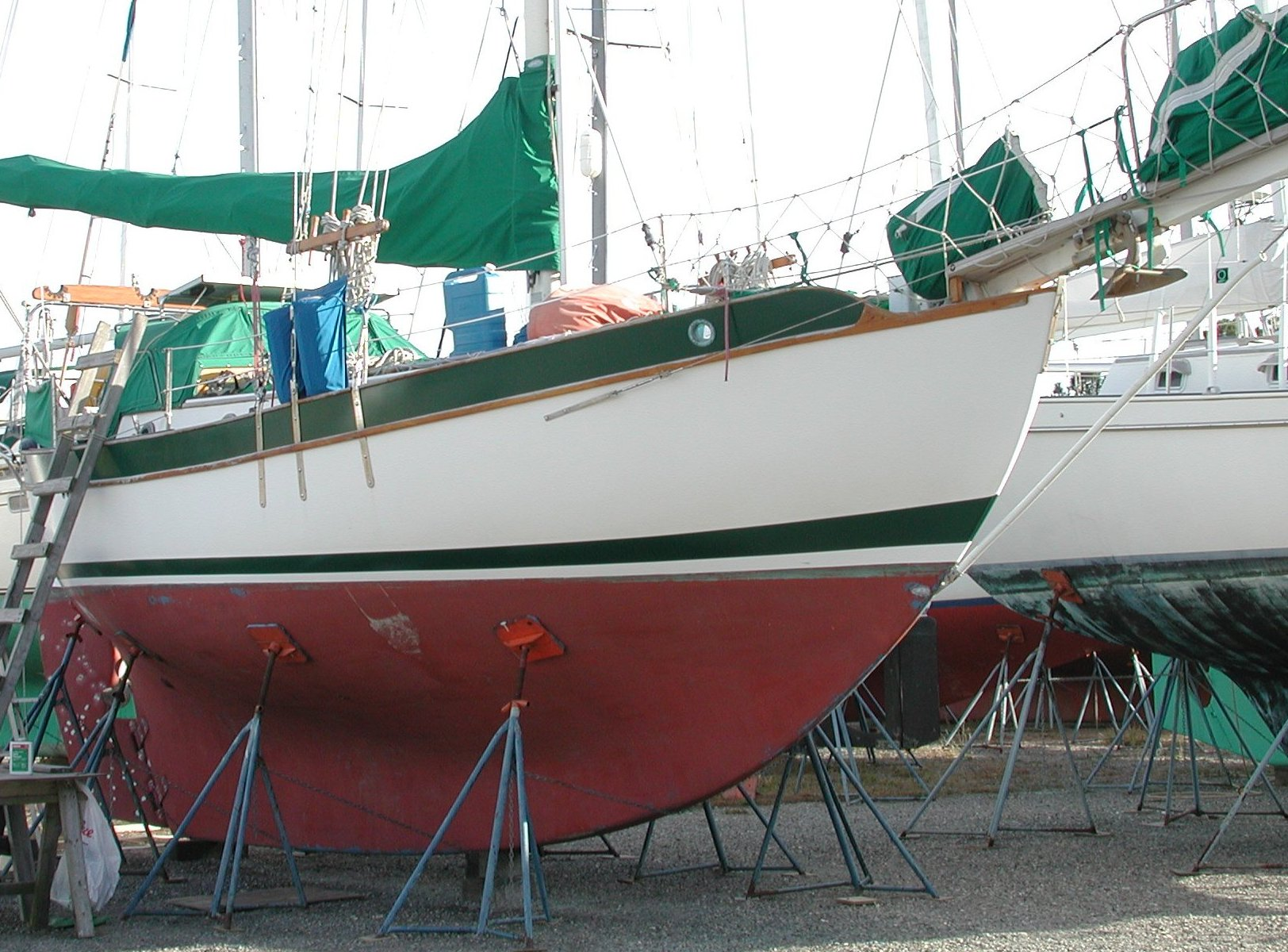
A Westsail 32 on stands in the boatyard, showing the shape of the hull, including the very full keel.

The Westsail 32 is a heavy-displacement sailboat designed for ultimate seaworthiness. She is massively constructed, and fitted with a comfortable and roomy interior.

=== Construction ===
The construction is extremely heavy, which appeals to many prospective cruisers. The hull is made of hand-laid fibreglass, in 12 layers, alternating woven roving with chopped strand mat, set in polyester resin. This results in a solid hull whose thickness ranges from half an inch at minimum to almost an inch. This is considerably more than most equivalent boats. The deck is half-inch plywood sheathed in GRP; the bulkheads are also plywood, tabbed to the hull with fibreglass cloth. The ballast is 7,000 lb (3,200 kg), either lead and iron (earlier boats) or all lead, installed inside the keel (which is part of the hull shape) and set in resin.

The trade-off for the construction strength is weight; at 19,500 lb (8,800 kg), the Westsail is exceptionally heavy for a 32-foot (9.8 m) boat. This hampers performance, but on the other hand, Westsails are affected relatively less by the large weight of stores and equipment required for long-term cruising (2 tons or more is quite typical).

The 400 kit boats were (except for a few) sold as complete hulls with ballast installed and the deck bonded on; it remained for the owner to fit out the interior and deck.

=== Deck and sail plan ===
Most Westsail 32s were rigged as cutters; i.e. with a single mast, mainsail, forestaysail and jib. The forestay terminates on the bow; a six-foot bowsprit supports the headstay, and the backstay terminates on a short boomkin, bringing the overall length with appendages of the typical boat to 40 feet (12 m). The shroud chainplates are bolted to the outside of the hull, making for a strong and reliable design, with clear side decks, at the expense of some sheeting angle for the jib.

The deck layout is geared towards ocean sailing, with wide side decks giving easy access forwards, and high bulwarks with high lifelines for safety. The cockpit is very small; this helps seaworthiness, as the weight of water which can be loaded onto the boat by a wave is limited. However, comfort in the cockpit is not helped.

=== Interior ===
The payoff for the short cockpit is a surprisingly roomy interior. The boat's maximum beam, already roomy at 11 feet (3.4 m), is carried much farther forward than in most boats; coupled with a headroom of 6 ft 2 in (1.88 m), this produces a remarkably spacious interior.

A number of different interior layouts were produced at the factory, with an even greater variety produced by home builders of the 400 kit boats sold. A typical layout will feature a galley and sizeable navigation station with a quarter berth aft, with two sofas or a sofa and dinette, a head and hanging locker, and a V-berth forwards. A common layout had pilot berths behind the settees. The quality of finish in the kit boats varies enormously, with some being well above factory standards.

=== Performance and seaworthiness ===
The Westsail's no-compromise approach to seaworthiness is carried through into her sailing performance. The heavy, full-keeled hull makes for good tracking offshore, coupled with a safe-feeling and quiet ride, but with limited performance. The overall effect is that the boat will get to wherever it is headed, but that it may take a while. Nevertheless, the Westsail is praised by many owners for being able to make a reasonable pace, particularly with a good wind. Indeed, in the right conditions the boat can perform well, as seen in the 1988 Pacific Cup, won (on corrected time) by the Westsail 32 Saraband in relatively light winds. The same boat finished third in 1990.

The Westsail's seaworthiness is attested by many stories of groundings, rollovers, and even collisions with freighters survived by the boats. A well-known example is Satori, a Westsail 32 which was abandoned during the famous 'Perfect Storm', but which survived undamaged despite being washed up on shore. The story of this yacht later featured heavily in the film The Perfect Storm, although the events were substantially altered, giving a falsely unfavourable account of the actions of the skipper.

== Impact ==
The Westsail 32 had a large impact on both the cruising world and the boat industry. The Westsail largely delivered on the promise of a boat that could take her owners anywhere in the world, and many boats have been sailed to exotic locations. Most of the boats are still fully seaworthy.

Westsails continue to be cited as the epitome of a seaworthy cruising boat. In discussions of seaworthiness versus performance, the design is frequently cited as "one end of the spectrum" (for either good or ill). The Westsail's reputation is usually summed up as "built like a tank, but unfortunately sails like one too". Nevertheless, the boat is still often praised as a design which "has a larger, nicer interior; can carry more, is more comfortable to live aboard at anchor and during passages; will last longer; will be more forgiving of owner neglect and mistakes; has a better chance of surviving groundings and other mishaps; and quite likely will hold its value better".

The success of the Westsail spawned many imitations, and led to a huge revival in "Archer-Atkin" double-ended designs, with boats such as Babas, Tashibas, Pandas, Hans Christians, Lord Nelsons, CTS, Union Cutters, Alejuelas, Tayanas, Willards, Dreadnaughts, Prairie Cutters, Pacific Seacrafts, and more. Subsequent designs, however, have sought to improve on the Westsail's sluggish performance, typically featuring a cutaway forefoot, lighter build, and larger sail plan. Many of these boats were built more cheaply in Taiwan.
