= Colin Archer =

Norwegian naval architect and shipbuilder (1832–1921)

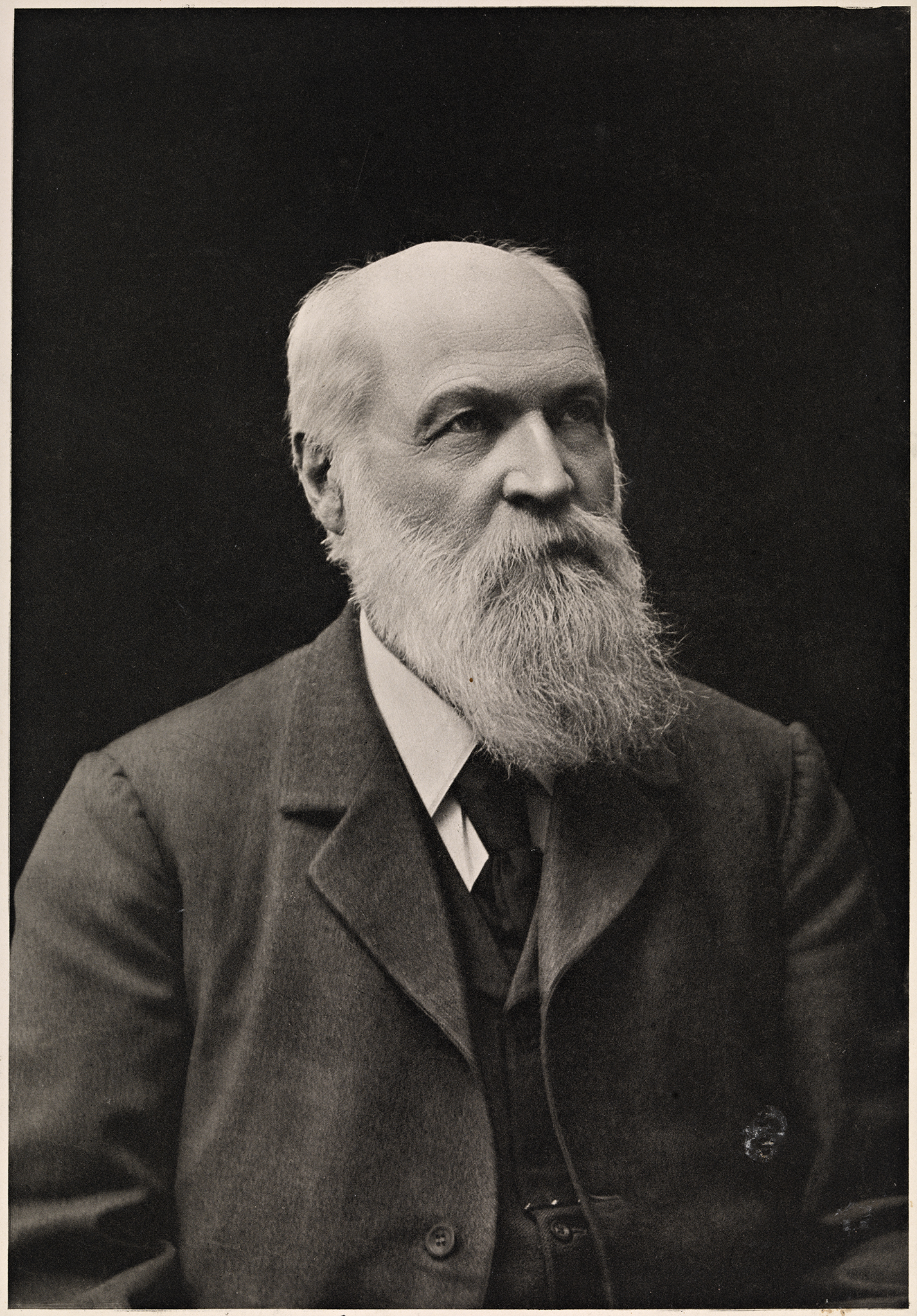
- Archer c. 1893
- Born: 22 July 1832; Larvik, Norway
- Died: 8 February 1921 (aged 88); Larvik, Norway
- Occupation: Shipbuilder
- Spouse: Karen Sophie Wiborg
- Children: 5
- Awards: Order of St. Olav

Colin Archer (22 July 1832 – 8 February 1921) was a Norwegian naval architect and shipbuilder known for his seaworthy pilot and rescue boats and the larger sailing and polar ships. His most famous ship is the Fram, used for both Fridtjof Nansen's and Roald Amundsen's polar expeditions.

He was born at Tollerodden in Larvik, Norway, where he also had his own house built and his boatyard.

== Early life ==
Colin Archer was born in Larvik in southern Norway as the 12th of 13 children to parents who immigrated to Norway from Scotland in 1825. Before his career in naval architecture, he spent time as a farmer and administrator in Queensland, Australia with several of his brothers, including David who first arrived in Sydney in 1834. During his time as an administrator he was contracted to produce a map of the Fitzroy River. Their settlement is now known as Gracemere Homestead.

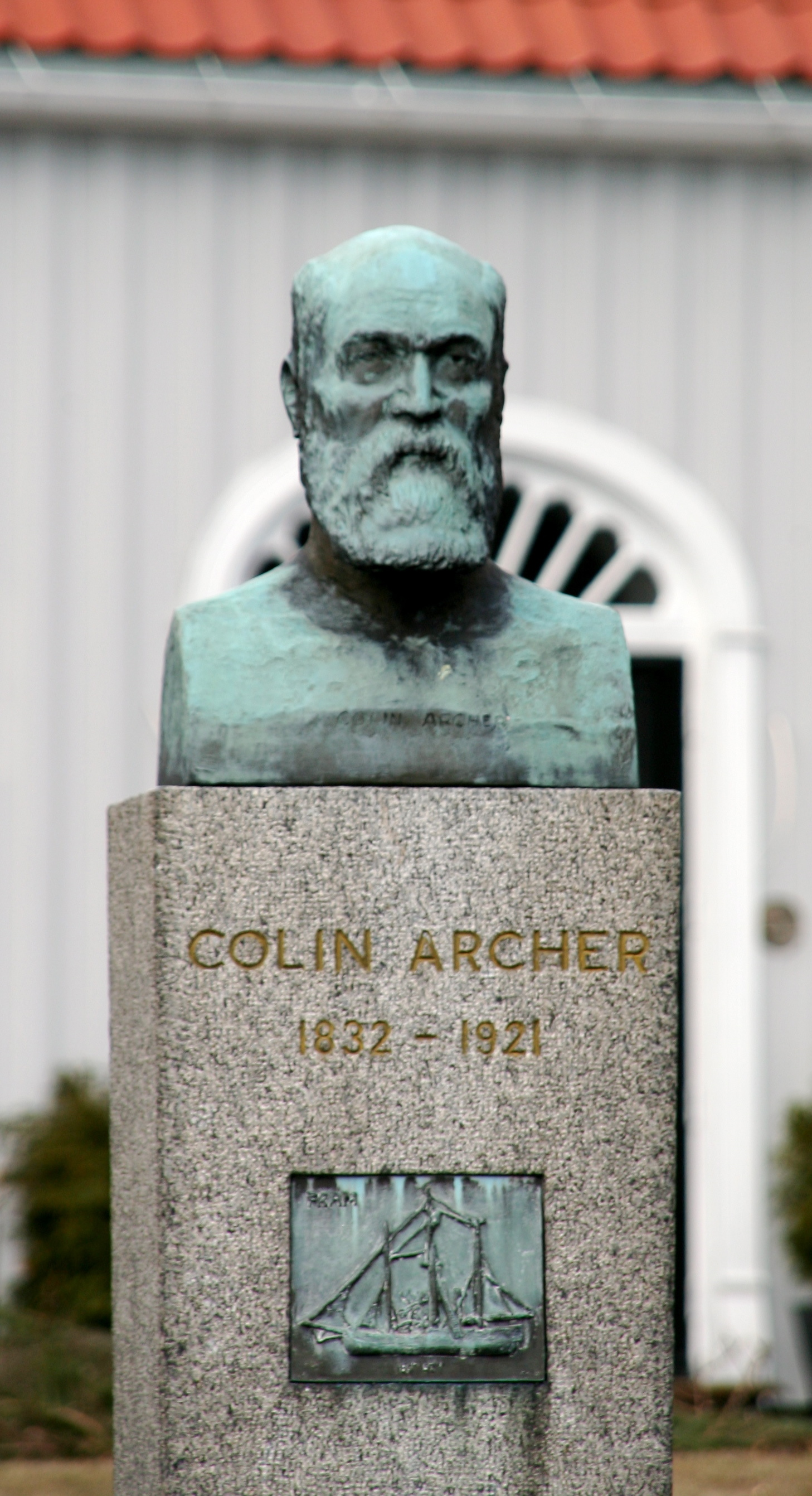
Bust of Colin Archer in Larvik, Norway

In 1861, Archer returned to Larvik and undertook the study of practical and theoretical shipbuilding. He married Karen Sophie Wiborg in 1869; they had five children.

== Career ==
Archer designed his vessels in the workroom of his residence at Tollerodden. Before he started building sailboats, he studied the work of Fredrik Henrik af Chapman and especially his displacement curve. He also studied John Scott Russell's theories. His first boats were designed with a combination of Chapman's displacement parabola curve and Scott Russell's positioning of midship section (defined as section with widest beam) that was well aft of amidships and with sharp bow waterlines. Based on this, Archer started to reform the pilot boat design in 1872.

In 1892 several of his pilot-boats rescued fishing boats in a severe off shore gale on the southeast coast of Norway, and after a design competition, he received an order to design a rescue boat for the Norwegian Society for Sea Rescue (Norsk Selskab til Skibbrudnes Redning). This 47-foot boat proved so seaworthy that 33 were built, giving Archer and his shipyard a reputation for durable and safe ships.

After the pilot boat had shown its seaworthiness, other boat builders started to copy Archer's lines and building method. The boats became referred to as a Colin Archer or Colin Archer-type no matter who designed or built them.

In a career that lasted until he ended his business at the age of 78, Archer built about 200 boats, 120 with ballast keels. His designs were also built at other yards, totaling about 50 during his lifetime. Archer built about 120 double-enders, but thousands have since been built worldwide. Boats are still (2017) being built and labelled Colin Archer-type. 35 of his boats are still sailing.

Archer also became famous for his ships, especially the polar ship Fram.

== Naval architect with ship yard ==
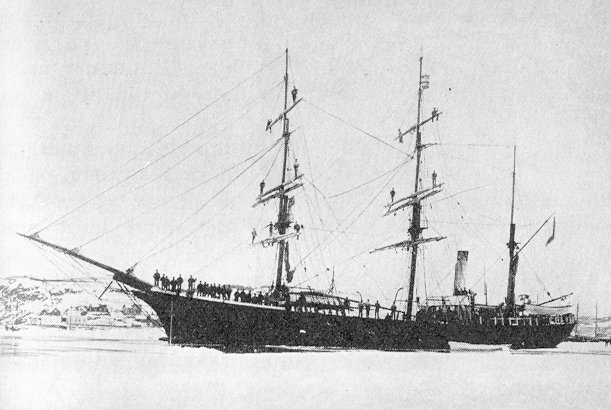
Seal and whale hunting bark CASTOR. 135 feet built in Arendal 1886. Fitted with 75 hp steam engine. Lost off Greenland 1896.

In 1872 Archer wanted to share his knowledge of ship and boat design. He published a 29-page design lecture that included Fredrik Henrik af Chapman's and John Scott Russell's theories. This was also good advertising for him that soon gave him orders.

Based on his belief in 1873 that shipbuilding is more lucrative than building boats, in 1874, Archer and investors founded the shipyard "Laurvig Strandværft" in Rekkevik in the Larvik fjord. At its start, Archer was a 30% owner of the shipyard. Rekkevik lies 3 km from the inner harbour of Larvik where his boatyard was situated at Tollerodden. One of the part owners of the shipyard was a ship owner and ordered the first ship. In 1886 Archer became sole owner of the shipyard.

=== Sailing ships ===
Laurvig Strandværft built four ships to Archer's designs:

- 1875: schooner Aries, 86 feet
- 1880: brigantine Leon, 108 feet
- 1892: polar ship Fram, 140 feet
- 1900: auxiliary steam yacht Ingeborg, 94 feet

Archer also designed several three-masted barques 135–155 feet that were used for building seven sailing ships in Arendal 1875–1886 and one in Grimstad in 1887, both towns on the south coast. Archer's shipyard also performed repair work and especially conversion and outfitting for polar expeditions.

=== The brigantine Leon; ship and model boat ===
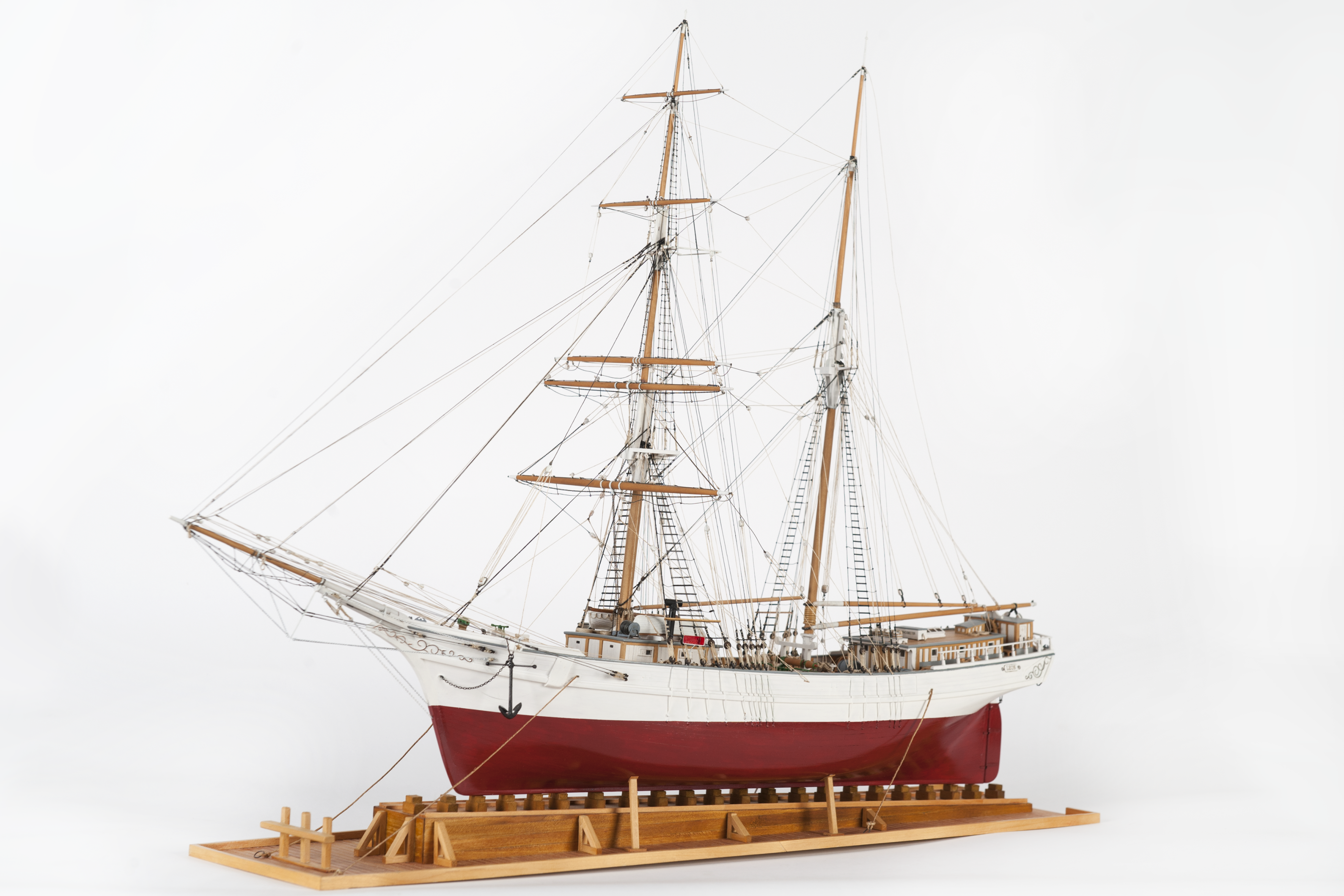
Model ship LEON at Swedish museum, Sjöhistoriska museet.

Leon was built 1878–1880 for Herlofson brothers in Arendal. The Herlofsons were a sailing and ship owning family, and Leon remained in the family's ownership until 1894. Leon then changed hands several times among various Norwegian owners. Leon was always rigged as a brigantine, but in Norway this rig is termed "Skonnertbrigg" and most often abbreviated to schooner, which has caused authors to believe the boat was re-rigged, but it was not. During late autumn of 1915 it developed a serious leak while on a voyage in the North Sea from Granton to Porsgrunn with coal, and was abandoned.

The plans for Leon were reproduced by Harold A. Underhill in 1958 in his book Plank-On-Frame Models and Scale Masting and Rigging, vol. I. Many models of Leon exist around the world, including one at Royal Museums Greenwich.

=== Polar ships ===
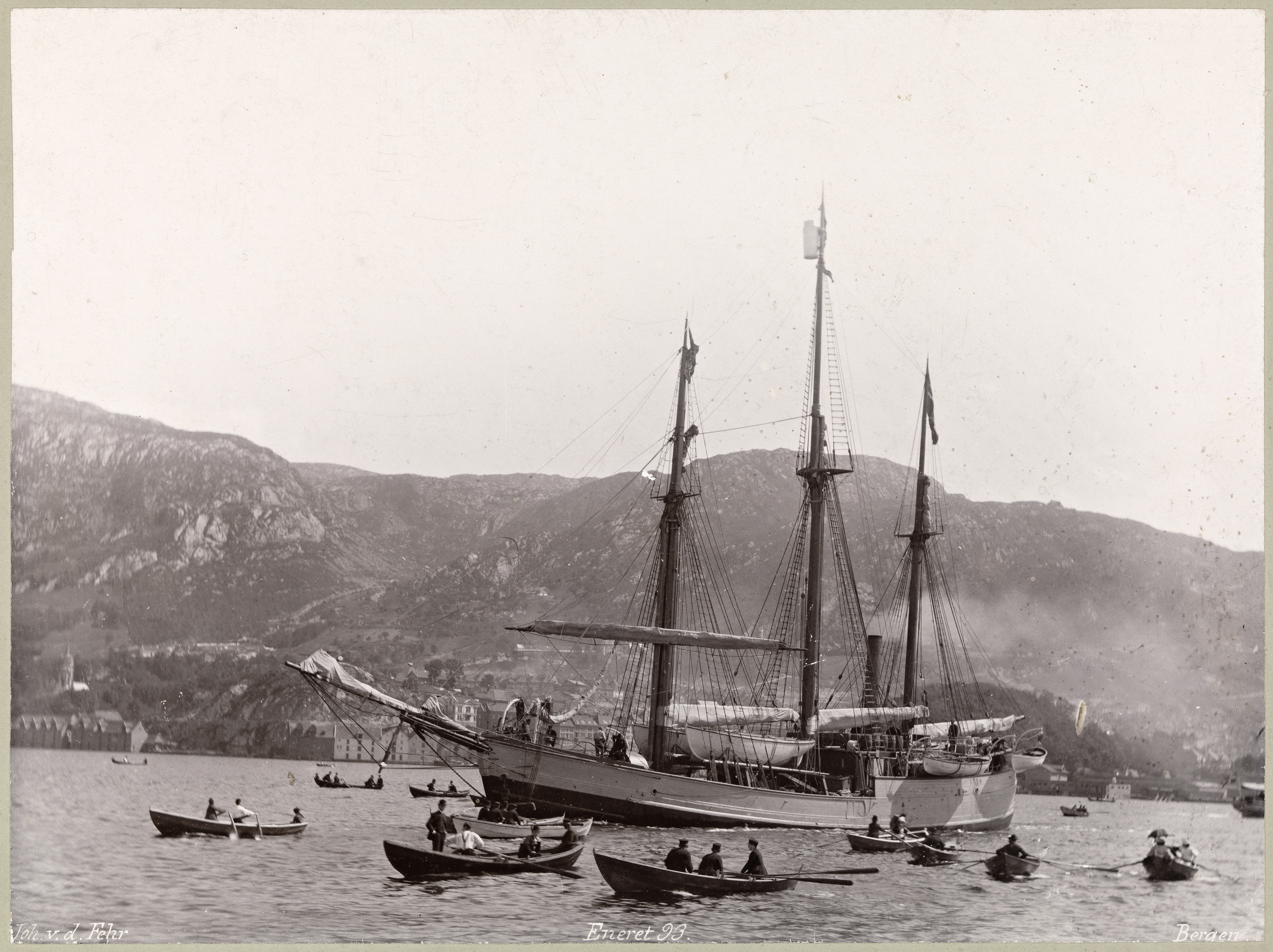
Fram loaded heavily at the start on its first voyage 1893.

The most notable single ship built by Colin Archer was the Fram, used by Fridtjof Nansen in his expedition attempt to the North Pole 1893–1896 and by Roald Amundsen's 1911 historic expedition as the first to the South Pole. Fram is now preserved in the Fram Museum on Bygdøy, Oslo, Norway.

In 1886 the 3-masted bark Pollux seal and whaling ship was built to Colin Archer's design in Arendal. In 1897 it was bought by Carsten Borchgrevink, taken to Archer's yard, and fitted out for polar expeditions. Renamed Southern Cross it was sailed to Antarctica during 1898–1900 (the Southern Cross Expedition), where Borchgrevink made important discoveries and was the first man to step on land on the mainland of Antarctica. Information from this expedition was later used by Roald Amundsen for his expedition to the South Pole.

In 1898 the Italian prince and explorer Prince Luigi Amedeo, Duke of the Abruzzi wanted to do polar expeditions. He travelled to Norway and consulted the famous polar explorer Fridtjof Nansen. In 1899 Amedo bought the former whaling vessel Jason, renamed it Stella Polare and took it to Colin Archer's shipyard. The interior was stripped out and new beams, diagonals and knees heavily strengthened the ship. Amedo set off in June 1899 and Stella Polare had a difficult time but survived thanks to Archer's work.

In 1899, Archer also fitted Zarya for the Russian polar expedition of 1900–02. Zarya was strengthened with internal frames and beams, and deckhouses were added. The rig was changed to barkentine (square sail on foremast only). In October 1899 the ship was certified by Norwegian authorities for a three-year expedition in the Arctic.

== Pilot boat reformator ==
Archer's first pilot-boat, 33 feet in length, was built in 1872. Influenced by Scott Russell's theories, it had the midship section 58% from the forward perpendicular as opposed to the traditional position of 44%. The traditional boats were thus of the old blunt Cod's Head-Mackerel Tail-type. They were also beamy and shallow with poor windward abilities.

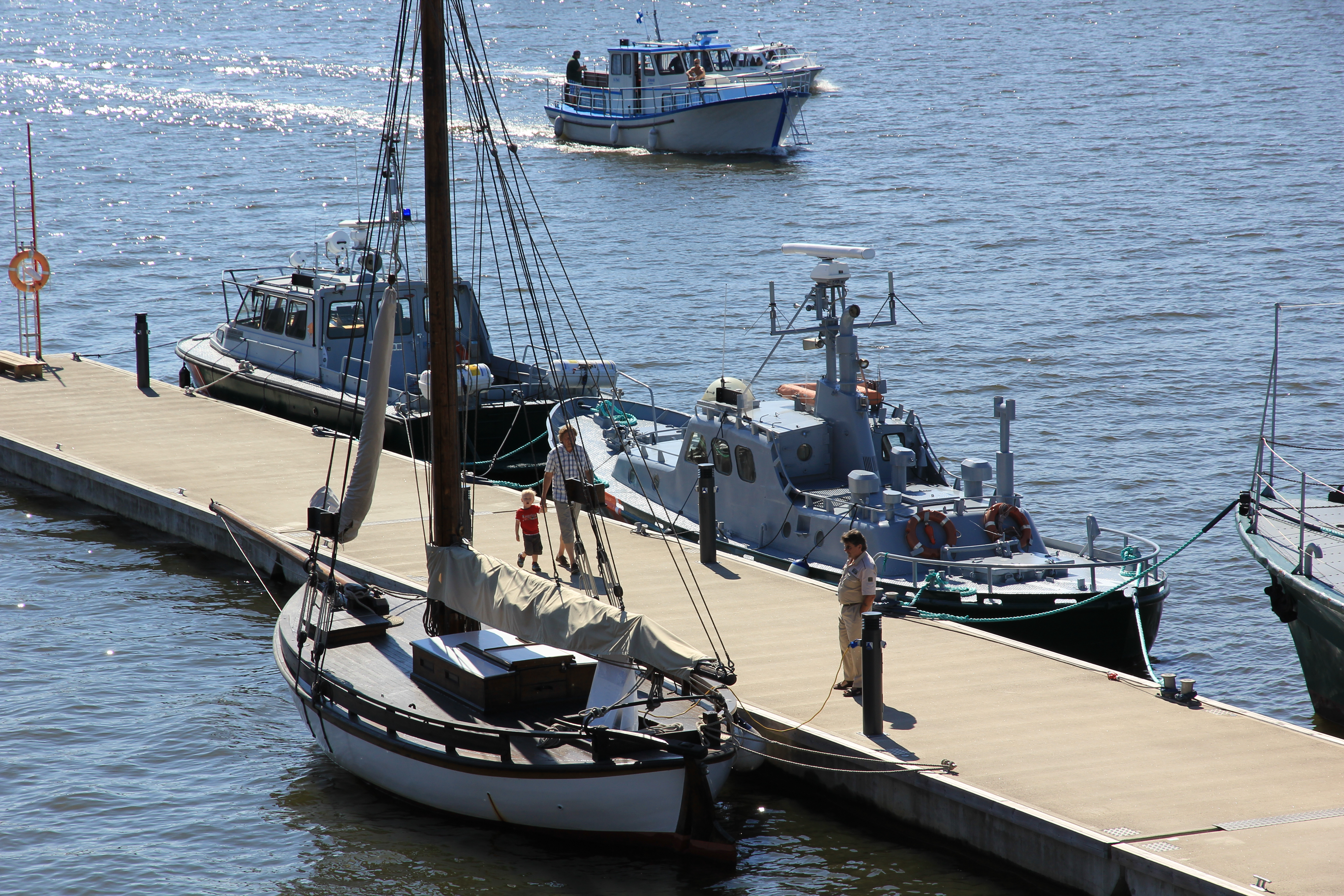
Pilot cutter Pitkäpaasi built 1898 as one of eight for the Finnish pilot department 1898-1903. Here pictured in Finland in 2011.

Archer also made his boats deeper with more ballast, built strongly with oak and they soon became known for seaworthiness and speed. Thus he started revolutionizing the Norwegian double-ended pilot-boats from his first boat.

The next and biggest pilot-boat improvement came in 1882, when he introduced the ballast keel and carvel building as before used on his yachts. With the improved stability generated by the ballast keel, Archer reduced the beam to 33% as opposed to the traditional 38–40%. The 36-foot boats were outstanding in performance and resisted capsizing.

In 1886 his pilot-boats outclassed all others in a pilot race with 1st, 2nd, 3rd, 4th, 6th, and 7th place of 12 participants. After that, he was made a Knight of the Order of St. Olav.

== Rescue boats ==
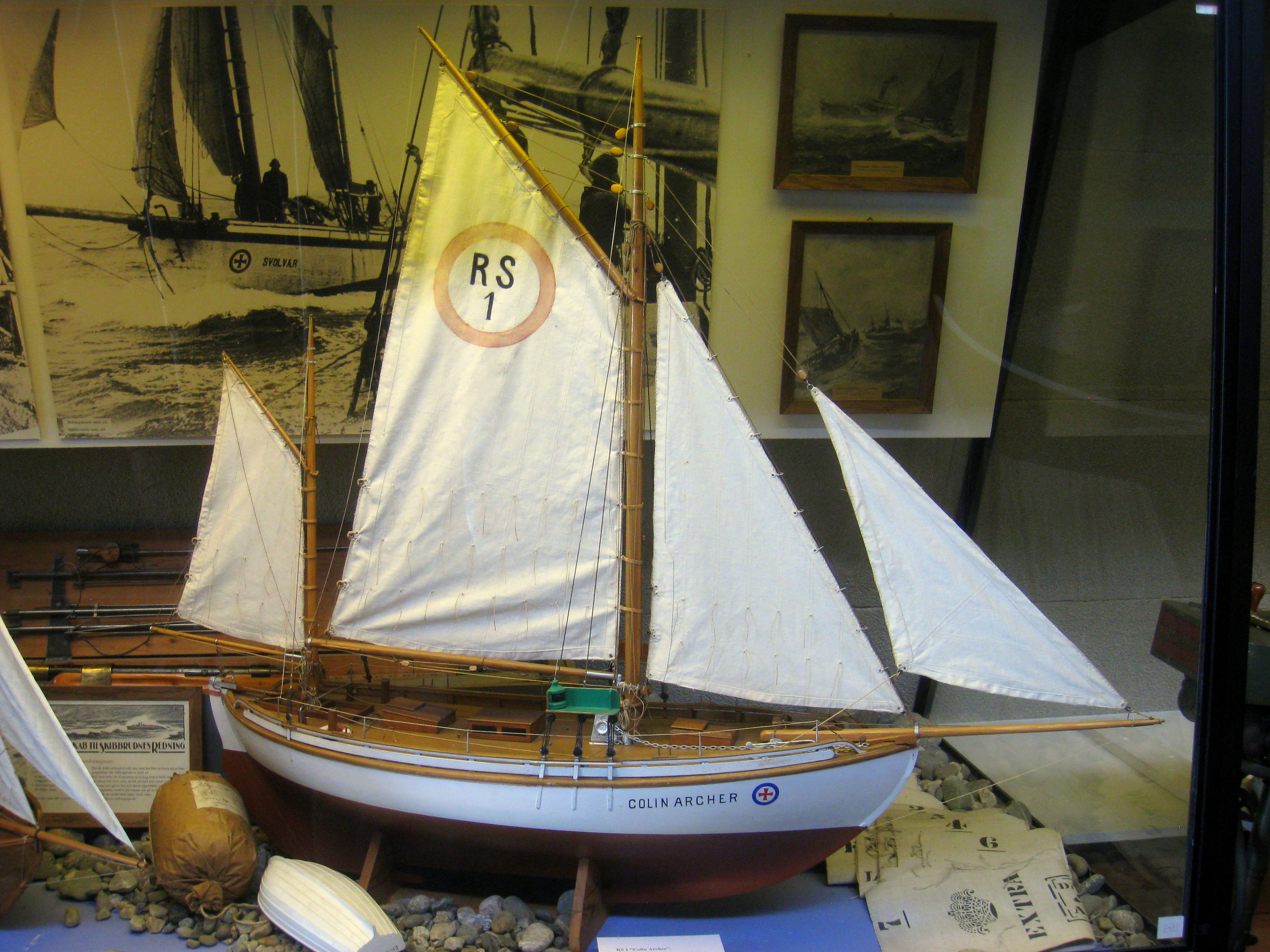
Model of RS 1 Colin Archer in the Fram Museum, Oslo, Norway

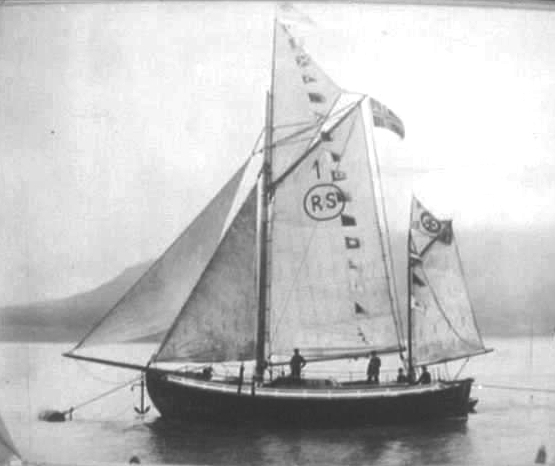
RS 1 Colin Archer as new in 1893. Later the boat was painted white.

After an offshore gale in 1892 when several of Archer's pilot boats rescued fishermen, it was thought that pilots should do the rescue operations. Three cutter-rigged Archer pilot boats were built; 38-, 41- and 42-foot length, fitted out as rescue boats and put into service in 1893 manned by pilots.

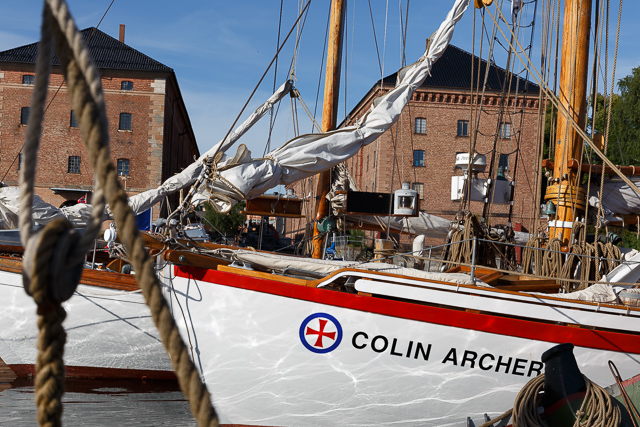
RS 1 Colin Archer built 1893 – photographed in Horten in 2014

To try a bigger and more specialized rescue boat, a design competition was held in 1892 and Archer got the order. He based his design on his newest pilot-boat and scaled the lines to 46 feet and reduced the beam ratio to 33.5%. Freeboard height was increased with about 20 cm. The keel was widened so the ballast keel became considerably heavier at 6.5 tons. The inside ballast remained the same, 6–7 tons. Ceiling, 45 mm planking fitted inside the frames, were made watertight and thus the boat would float and be maneuverable in case of a leak or damage. The boat was rigged as ketch and launched July 1893 as the RS 1 Colin Archer.

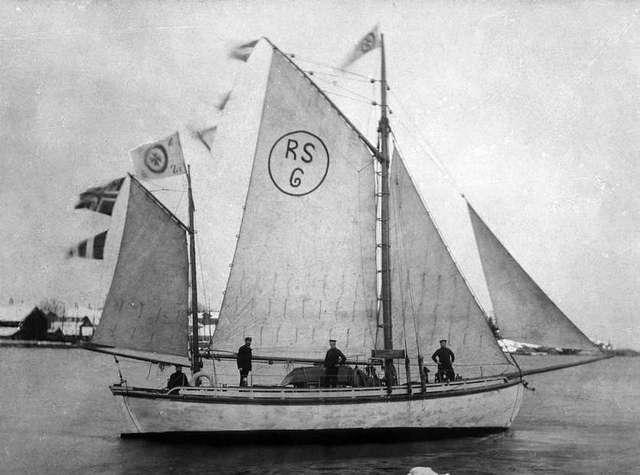
RS 6, built 1894, identical to RS1 Colin Archer

In service, it was soon realized, that the rescue boats had to sail out with fishing fleets every day. As there were no weather forecasts and no distress signals, the rescue boats had to be at the scene if a storm arrived. As the wind increased, the smallest boats were towed to safety and returned to tow larger boats. The pilots could not be with the fishermen all day so the design chosen for new boats was the large ketch.

33 ketch-rigged rescue boats were built from 1893 to 1924. 28 of the ketches were Archer’s design and 13 were built by Archer. From 1909–1924 the last 13 ketches were built in the Risør area (35 n.m. SW of Larvik). Only one rescue boat was lost at sea without a trace.

Archer made two new plans for rescue boats. The Mk II was built in 1897 has more overhang in the bow profile and thus more flare in the bow sections and a slightly fuller waterline in the bow. Length over deck became 47 feet and the boat had more stability for towing. Mk. III was built in 1908 with 20 cm more beam (34.4%) and a considerably fuller bow, but a finer stern. All versions have the midship section approx. 53% from the forward perpendicular. Mk. III's lines are more symmetrically shaped than Archer normally used. The Mk. III rescue boat was considered the best boat in strong winds and most towing abilities.

Framing is kept relatively light with frame spacing 60–66 cm c-c with a thin stem bent oak rib in between. Planking was 38 mm oak and the inside of the frames was also planked (ceiling) with 50 mm pine. This was caulked watertight to the watertight cabin sole (floor) and thus, and floated when the planking got a leak.

To minimize pitching to give the boats an easier motion and keep the deck dry, the ballast was concentrated midships, and anchor windlass and chain placed aft of the mast.

The rig was ketch (two mast) with a relatively short mast and very small mizzen. In a strong wind, they normally sailed with main and staysail only, often reefed. With boats in tow, the mizzen was used to point higher to the wind and help to tack. The rig was basically the same for all boats, but the spars became heavier for each upgrade.

The last sailing rescue boat was built in 1924. Next generation boats, the Bjarne Aas design with an engine but also full rig was built in 1932. A dozen of Archer's design served without an engine until 1940. With engine installed, they served until 1960.

== Yachts ==
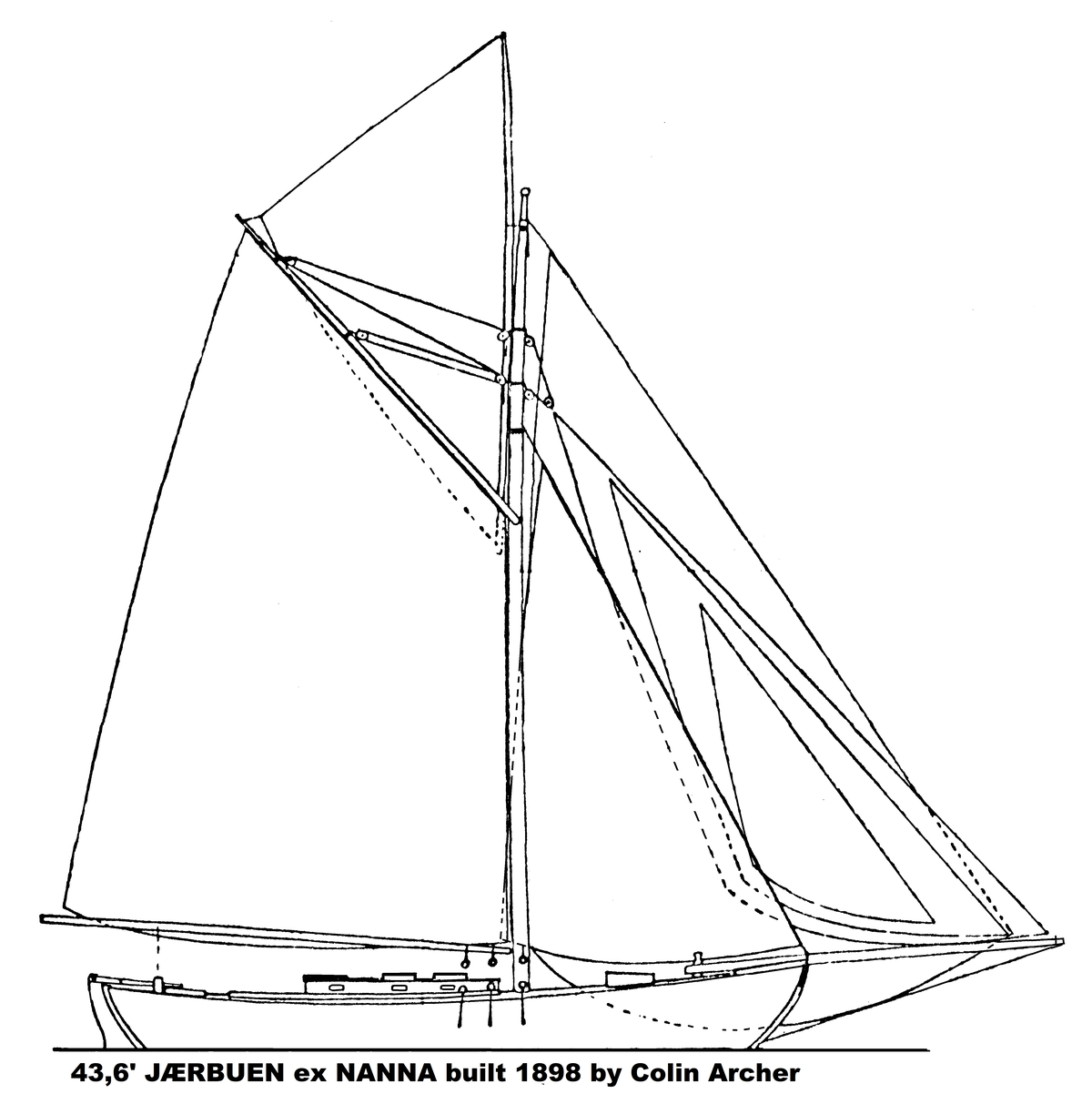
Nanna built 1898 by Colin Archer. The cutter rig is typical for his yachts.

Colin Archer built about 60 yachts, each to a unique drawing, half being double-enders and the other half with counter sterns. Many of both double-enders and the counter stern yachts have plum stems. All yachts have more undercut forefoot than the workboats, especially after 1897.

The beam is 22–30% of the length over the deck. (As opposed to 33–36% for the pilot-boats and the rescue boats).

All yachts, except the Asgard, and all pilot-boats, are cutter rigged (one mast). The yachts have their main boom extending the stern for several feet that with a relatively tall mast enhanced performance. (The pilot-boats' boom normally extends the sternpost by one foot. Only the rescue boats and a few fishing boats, are ketch-rigged (two masts)). The sail area for the yachts is in the range 100–125% of waterline length squared.

On almost all boats, Archer spaced grown pine frames 2 feet c-c with a thin steam-bent oak rib between. This, together with thin, canvassed decks, made the yachts fairly light. The yachts have large ballast keels and normally no inside ballast, except a little for trim.

== Archer's wave form theory ==
Archer spent much time calculating how an efficient hull should be designed. He started with Chapman's displacement parabola curve, but with Scott Russell's positioning of the midship section well aft of amidships and thus with sharp bow waterlines.

In 1876 he changed Chapman's parabola for the displacement curve, with Scott Russell's wave curves; the sine curve forward and the trochoid curve aft. The change gave designers more freedom in shaping the hull than Scott Russell's theory.

Archer's theory did not change Colin Archer's early lines much, more confirmed them. Archer's theory gave fuller bow lines than Scott Russell's, but unless the forefoot was well undercut, Archer's bow lines also became too sharp with a tendency to make the boats "pitchy" and wet. With more undercut forefoot and the displacement curve extending the designed waterline, the lines became fuller and Archer's boats became the seaworthy boats he is known for.

We know now that none of these theories are correct, but they did away with the excessively blunt bow of the old Cod's Head-Mackerel Tail-type.

== Legacy ==
Colin Archer sold several boats to Sweden during the early 1880s and Swedish designers soon adapted the Archer type for pilot-boats and yachts. Norwegian pilot- and fishing boat builders converted to the Archer type after the rescue boat had shown its seaworthiness in 1894.

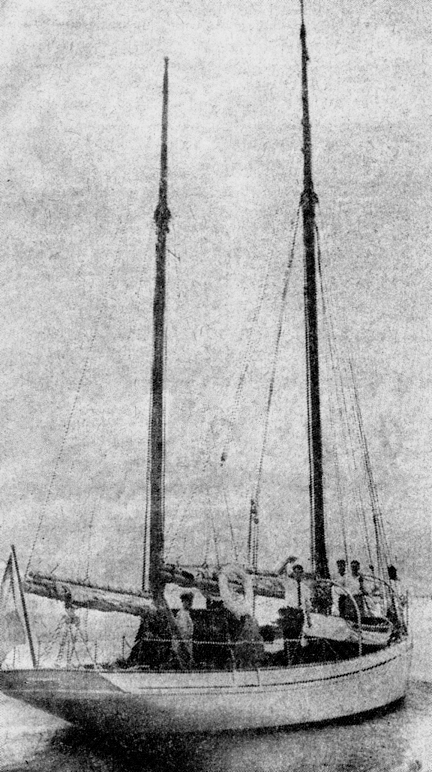
Asgard, Archer's only two-masted yacht. Half of Archer's 50 yachts had counter sterns similar to Asgard's.

Archer also had customers in Denmark, Germany, Holland and England. In 1904, he built a boat for the writer Erskine Childers named the Asgard.

Outside Scandinavia, the rescue boat lines have been the most popular design. The Archer-type outside of Norway has more beam and smaller rig than Archer's actual yachts.

In 1908 the 47 feet Oeger was designed by Archer but built in Porsgrunn. The customer was the English sailor Haig that had already sailed in north Norway and wanted to have a more seaworthy boat to go to Spitsbergen. The lines were narrower version (32% beam) of the Mk. III rescue boat. The rig, however, was cutter with large sail area. The boat was sold to Ralph Stock in 1919 who undertook a cruise around the world with her. In 1921 the popular book The Cruise of the Dream Ship based on Stock's voyage was published.

During the early 1920s, a 47 feet yacht was built in China. The lines were based on Archer's 1908 Mk. III rescue boat plans. The boat was named Shanghai and sailed to Denmark in 1923/24 by the Danish owners and sold to an American judge F. DeWitt Wells to undertake a voyage similar to the Vikings to America. In June 1923, plans for Shanghai were published in the American magazine MotorBoat.

In 1924 William Atkin was contacted by W.W. Nutting, editor of the American magazine MotorBoat and earlier Atkin customer. He wanted a yacht based on Colin Archer's rescue boats. Atkin designed a 32 feet yacht with lines basically a scaled-down version of Colin Archer's Mk. III rescue boat, slightly sharper bow lines and with a cutter rig. The design was called Eric and was published in the Motorboat. Nutting, however, heard that boats were cheaper in Norway and cancelled the order. In Norway he bought a 40 feet second-hand double ender. Although built as yacht, the lines were basically of a fishing boat design with a great beam (by 14,5 feet – 36%) and without a ballast keel. It had high bulwarks and the large cockpit that was not self-draining to give access to the engine beneath. Nutting wanted to sail the northerly route to America, and in the boat Liev Eriksson, left Norway at same time as Shanghai. Nutting and his crew were lost without trace off Greenland in September. Shanghai also had problems: as her sails parted, they blew ashore on an island on Nova Scotia, but one crew managed to swim ashore in the breakers and pull the others ashore with lines. He thereafter managed to swim to the mainland so a boat could rescue the others.

William Atkin's plans for Eric, published in MotorBoat arose immediate interest. Plans were modified with a new interior, ketch rig and three boats were built and launched in 1925. Atkin received more orders and more Archer-type yachts were designed. The Ingrid in 1934 is 37.5 feet and a stretched version (beam 30%) with well-undercut forefoot and hollow waterlines. The lines resemble Archer's yachts except Archer had greatest beam further aft. Archer, on his later yachts, used fuller lines, especially aft.

The Eric went on to become very influential in ocean sailing, with boats such as Vito Dumas's Lehg II and Robin Knox-Johnston's Suhaili making notable circumnavigations. The latter was the first boat to sail single-handed and non-stop around the world in 1968 Golden Globe Race. Suhaili was very under canvassed and definitely the slowest boat in the race, but as the only one of nine boats to complete the race, she took both first prizes; the first and fastest boat.

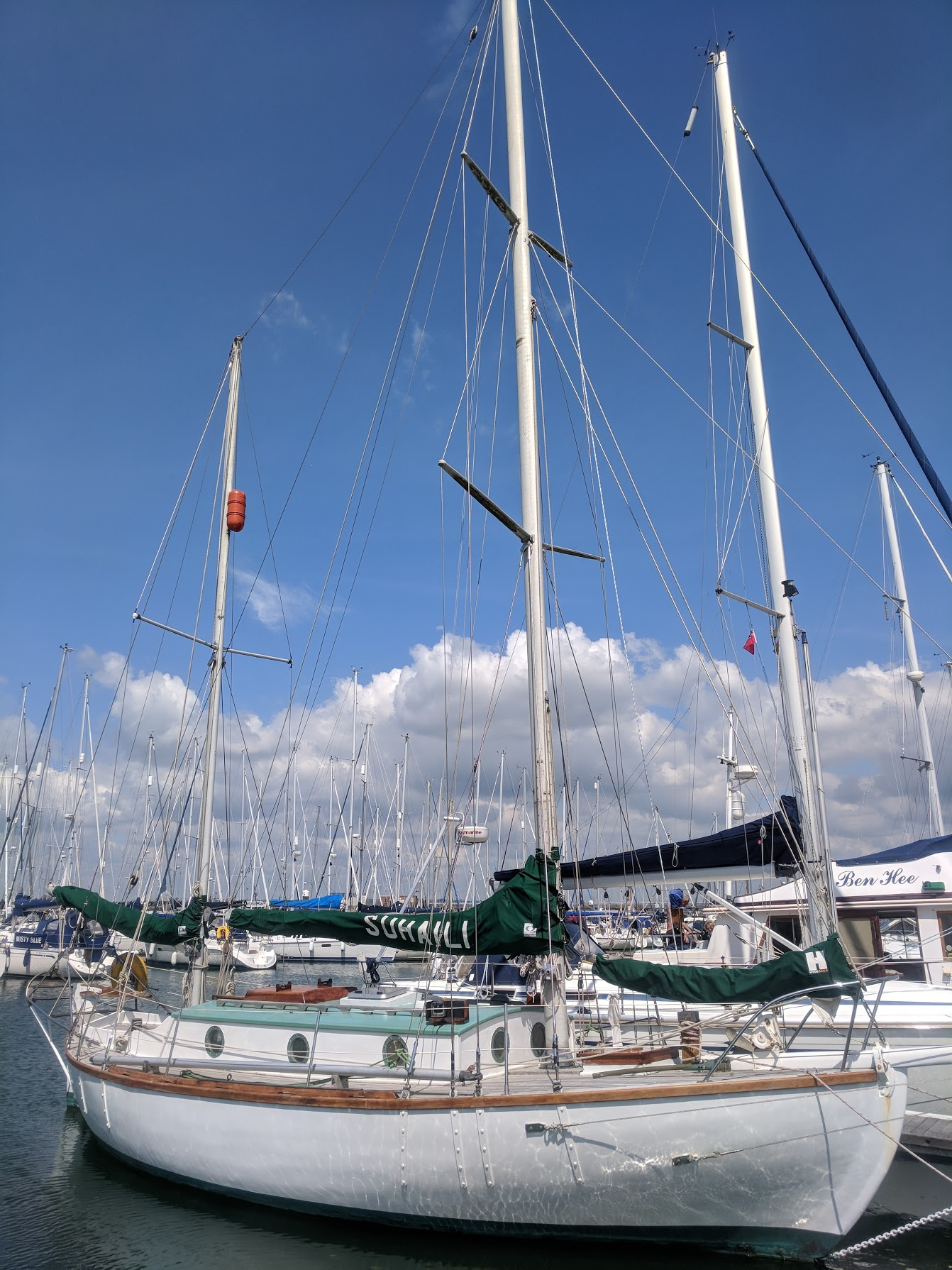
Robin Knox-Johnston's Suhaili

Another Colin Archer type boat to become very famous in the 1968 Golden Globe Race, was the French sailor and author Bernard Moitessier in his custom-built 39-foot steel ketch Joshua. She had a tall rig and was catching up on Suhaili, but instead of passing the finishing line, Moitessier continued around the world to Tahiti, thus sailing 1.5 times around the globe, non-stop, single-handed.

During the 1970s, Atkin's Eric design was adapted to glass-reinforced plastic by William Crealock, and became the Westsail 32 and has inspired many imitations, so that the "Archer double-ender" style of boat continues to be popular to the present day.

The Argentinian naval architect Manuel M. Campos based his designs on Archer/Atkin and built Vito Dumas's Lehg II in 1934 in Argentina. Other Campos designs have less draught that the typical Archer-type.

The Tahiti ketch is derived from the Archer-type. The Tahiti ketch is characterized by a straight sternpost, less draught and its small rig. The straight sternpost and hull shape make it easier to build.

The 'Venus' yachts built by Paul Erling Johnson in the 1960s and 1970s are also heavily influenced by Colin Archer's designs.

== Awards ==
- Knight of the Order of St. Olav -1886
- Commander of Order of St. Olav - 1896
- Fram-medaljen - 1896

== Selected works ==
- Colin Archer. Anvisning til konstruktion af lystfartöier og både. Polyteknisk tidsskrift 1872, Hefte 5. & 6. (Design lecture with Fredrik Henrik af Chapman's and John Scott Russell's theories.)
- Colin Archer. On the wave principle, applied to the longitudinal disposition on immersed volume (The Institution of Naval Architects, 13 April 1878)

== Other sources ==
- Serle, Percival (1949). "Archer, Thomas". Dictionary of Australian Biography. Sydney: Angus & Robertson.
