= Pacific Seacraft 40 =

Cruising sailboat designed by Bill Crealock

Development
- Designer: W.I.B. Crealock
- Year: 1997 -
- Name: Pacific Seacraft 40

Boat
- Draft: 5' 2" (shoal), 6' 1" (standard)

Hull
- Type: Monohull yacht
- Hull weight: 24,000 lb
- LOA: 42' 2"
- LWL: 31' 3"
- Beam: 12' 5"

Hull appendages
- Keel: Fin

Rig
- Rig type: Bermudan cutter

Sails
- Total sail area: 846 ft^{2}

The Pacific Seacraft 40 is a bluewater cruising yacht produced since 1996 by Pacific Seacraft of Washington, North Carolina. Although of GRP construction, the yacht is traditionally built with a cutter rig, skeg-hung rudder, canoe stern and semi-long keel. The yacht is a cruising design, with a high displacement and the characteristic 'canoe' stern of Bill Crealock.

== See also ==
- Pacific Seacraft 37
- Pacific Seacraft 44
