= Pacific Seacraft 34 =

Development
- Designer: W.I.B. Crealock
- Year: 1984 -
- Name: Pacific Seacraft 34

Boat
- Draft: 4' 1" (shoal), 4' 11" (standard)

Hull
- Type: Monohull yacht
- Hull weight: 13,500 lb
- LOA: 34' 1"
- LWL: 26' 3"
- Beam: 10' 0"

Hull appendages
- Keel: Fin

Rig
- Rig type: Bermudan cutter

Sails
- Total sail area: 534 ft^{2}

The Pacific Seacraft 34 is a bluewater cruising yacht produced since 1984 by Pacific Seacraft of Washington, North Carolina. Although of GRP construction, the yacht is traditionally built with a cutter rig, skeg-hung rudder, canoe stern and semi-long keel. The yacht is a cruising design, with a high displacement and the characteristic 'canoe' stern of Bill Crealock.

== See also ==
- Pacific Seacraft 31
- Pacific Seacraft 37
