= Pacific Seacraft 31 =

Bluewater cruising yacht produced since 1987

Development
- Designer: W.I.B. Crealock
- Year: 1987 -

Boat
- Draft: 4' 0" (shoal), 4' 11" (standard)

Hull
- Type: Monohull yacht
- Hull weight: 11,000 lb
- LOA: 31' 10"
- LWL: 24' 2"
- Beam: 9' 10"

Hull appendages
- Keel: Fin

Rig
- Rig type: Bermudan cutter

Sails
- Total sail area: 485 ft^{2}

The Pacific Seacraft 31 is a bluewater cruising yacht produced since 1987 by Pacific Seacraft, now of Washington, North Carolina. Although of GRP construction, the yacht is traditionally built with a cutter rig, skeg-hung rudder and semi-long keel. The yacht is a cruising design, with a high displacement designed by Bill Crealock.

The design's origins trace to 1984, when Pacific Seacraft commissioned Crealock to create a smaller version of his popular Crealock 37; he initially drew a 34-foot adaptation before condensing the concept into the 31-foot design introduced in 1987.

== See also ==
- Pacific Seacraft 34
- Pacific Seacraft 37
