= Bruce Bingham =

American naval architects (1940–2022)

Bruce Potter Bingham (March 10, 1940 – November 1, 2022) designed sailboats including the Flicka 20 and, on the larger end, the Fantasia 35, Anastasia 32, and the Andromeda 48.

Bingham was also an author, having written Workbench, a longstanding column in Cruising World magazine. He also wrote a number of sailing books including Ferro Cement: Design, Techniques and Applications and Cruising Sketchbook.

Bingham was born in Detroit. He died on November 1, 2022, aged 82.

== Designs ==
Bingham's designs include:

- Flicka 20 - 1974
- Andromeda 48 - 1976
- Fantasia 35 - 1976
- Anastasia 32 - 1977
- Allegra 24 - 1984
