= Naramatac =

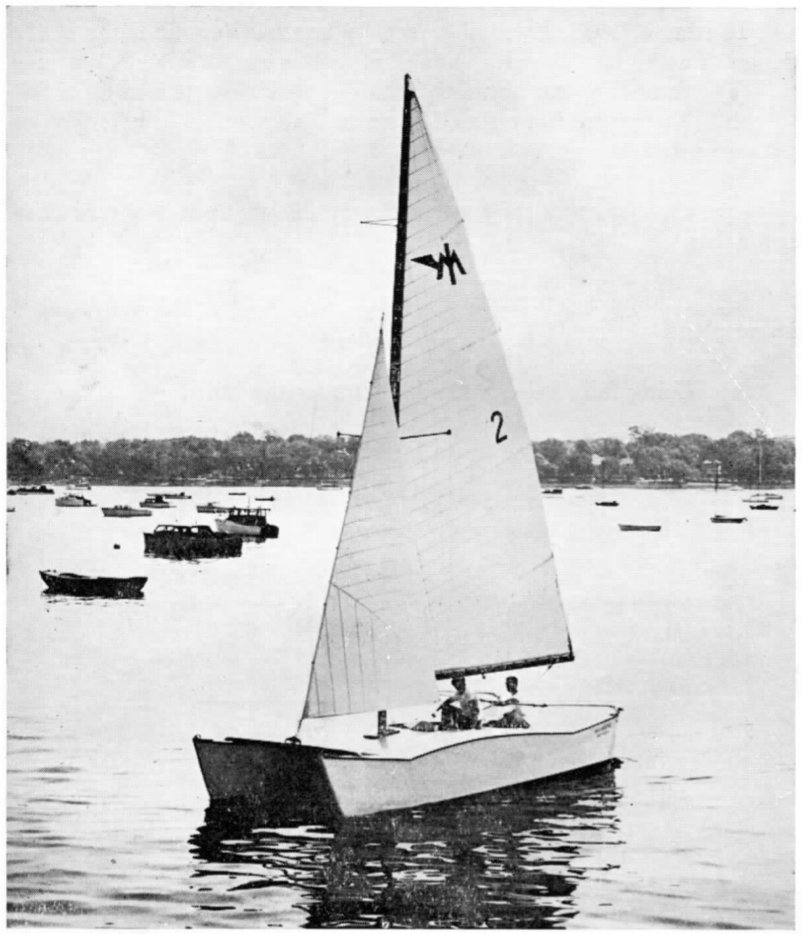
- Naramatac on the water.

Development
- Designer: Robert B. Harris
- Location: United States
- Year: 1948 (design); 1950 (launch)
- Role: day sailer
- Name: Naramatac

Hull
- Type: catamaran
- LOA: 25 ft (7.6 m)

Naramatac was a catamaran sailboat designed by Robert B. Harris in 1948 and launched in 1950. Its innovative use of asymmetric hulls later became a hallmark of the Hobie Cat.

== Concept ==
I was looking for a day sailer which, though not necessarily a speed demon, would easily go by other boats of her size, would manoeuvre well and go to windward. I also paid some attention to making her easy to build with thoughts for the home builder.

— Robert B. Harris

== Efficacy ==
Harris' design was not entirely successful, however. At speed the flat bottoms pounded, and it showed poor performance in low wind which he ascribed to deep hulls (particularly aft), lack of stability to carry additional sail, too much wetted surface, and too heavy construction.

While the trials of Naramatac demonstrated her speed to be proportional to Manu Kai and proved that a small catamaran was practical, they also showed that she was sluggish in maneuver, slow in light to moderate winds, had far too much longitudinal motion, and lacked stability due to excessive narrowness in hull spacing.

— Robert B. Harris

== See also ==
- List of multihulls
