= Flicka 20 =

Sailboat class

Development
- Designer: Bruce Bingham
- Location: United States
- Year: 1974
- No. built: 400
- Builders: Nor'Star Fiberglass Yachts; Pacific Seacraft
- Name: Flicka 20

Boat
- Displacement: 5,500 lb (2,495 kg)
- Draft: 3.25 ft (0.99 m)

Hull
- Type: Monohull
- Construction: Fiberglass
- LOA: 24.00 ft (7.32 m)
- LWL: 18.17 ft (5.54 m)
- Beam: 8.00 ft (2.44 m)
- Engine: Yanmar 1GM10 10 hp (7 kW) diesel engine

Hull appendages
- Keel: long keel
- Ballast: 1,720 lb (780 kg)
- Rudder: keel-mounted rudder

Rig
- Rig type: Cutter rig
- I foretriangle height: 27.90 ft (8.50 m)
- J foretriangle base: 10.50 ft (3.20 m)
- P mainsail luff: 23.30 ft (7.10 m)
- E mainsail foot: 8.90 ft (2.71 m)

Sails
- Sailplan: Gaff rigged or Bermuda rigged cutter
- Mainsail area: 103.69 sq ft (9.633 m^{2})
- Jib/genoa area: 146.48 sq ft (13.608 m^{2})
- Total sail area: 250.16 sq ft (23.241 m^{2})

Racing
- PHRF: 288 (average)

The Flicka 20 is a recreational keelboat built from 1974 to 1998

== Production ==
The design was originally sold in the form of plans for amateur construction, with more than 200 sets of plans sold. Bruce Bingham, the designer, commenced the construction of a plug for a hull of his own, but was compelled to sell it before it was completed to Nor'Star Fiberglass Yachts in California United States, who put the boat into production. Nor'Star produced kits for owner completion and also ready-to-sail boats, built under contract by Westerly Marine of Santa Ana, California. In 1977, Nor'Star ended production and the molds and tooling were purchased by Pacific Seacraft of Washington, North Carolina, which produced the design until 1998.

During the period the boat was produced a wide range of materials were used and the boats can vary widely.

== Design ==
It is based upon the general design of early Newport, Rhode Island lobster boats that were sailed upon Block Island Sound in the mid-1800s.

Bingham saw some of these on a river near Wickford, Rhode Island in the 1950s and made sketches of them. The boat design was featured in a six-part article in Rudder magazine starting in September 1972. The boat was proposed for building in ferro-cement construction at that time, but later changed to fiberglass, although wooden examples with caravel planking were also built.

The hull has a length overall of 20.00 ft (6.10 m) and a waterline length of 18.17 ft (5.54 m). Including the bowsprit, the total length is 24.00 ft (7.32 m). The hull has a slightly spooned plumb stem, an over-vertical transom, a keel-mounted rudder controlled by a tiller and a fixed long keel. It displaces 5,500 lb (2,495 kg) and carries 1,720 lb (780 kg) of ballast. The design has a draft of 3.25 ft (0.99 m) with the standard keel fitted.

It has a cutter rig with a bowsprit. It was sold as a gaff-rig or a Bermuda rig. There are two jib sheet winches in the cockpit, bronze deck hardware and an anchor roller mounted on the bow. Many different sail combinations were sold, including jibs, genoas, drifters, yankees and a spinnaker.

The boat has been fitted with a number of engines, including the Yanmar 1GM10 diesel engine of 10 hp (7 kW), while some use outboard engines. The fuel tank holds 12 U.S. gallons (45 L; 10.0 imp gal) and the fresh water tank has a capacity of 20 U.S. gallons (76 L; 17 imp gal).

Accommodation includes a forward "V"-berth a galley situated amidships, with a hinged table and an icebox. There is an enclosed head. The cabin has teak trim and a holly sole, plus standing headroom.

The design has a PHRF racing average handicap of 288 with a high of 270 and low of 303. It has a hull speed of 5.71 kn (10.57 km/h).

The Flicka 20 was developed into the larger Allegra 24.

== Reception ==
In a review in Good Old Boat magazine, John Vigor wrote, " The Flicka is high quality in a small package with a large price tag. But you have to remember that she offers the accommodations (if not the performance) of a boat 6 or 8 feet longer. For a cruising couple, that's snug, but ample ... Because she is a cult boat, and because she is strongly and sensibly constructed, the Flicka retains her value very well on the second-hand market. She ages well, and there is very little to go wrong. The price of a used Flicka will be substantially lower than that of a new boat, of course, but there are very few basement bargains unless you happen to come across one of the pre-1978 originals, built by an amateur from a finished hull or a kit. Flickas built by Pacific Seacraft are rugged, solid craft, with top-quality cabinetry, finish, and detailing. There isn't another production boat of her size in the U.S. that rivals her interior space and ocean-going capabilities. She's small enough to handle easily, but big enough to live in comfortably. For the price of a new Flicka, you could buy a used larger boat of another make, just as seaworthy and a whole lot faster and more comfortable. Hundreds of Flicka owners know that full well, but they're not tempted. This little spellbinder is all they've ever sought and all they'll ever need."

In a 2010 review Steve Henkel wrote, "the Flicka ('happy little girl' in Swedish) is a stiff and stable midget cruise-maker, originally built in wood. Nor'star on the United States west coast began fiberglass production in 1975, selling both kits and completed boats. Home-built versions have included cutters, yawls, sloops, schooners, and even junk-rigged. In 1978 Pacific Seacraft bought the tooling and built over 400 Flicka sloops and cutters, ceasing production in 1998. Flickas are considered a very high-quality product, and generally command a premium price in the used market. Best features: Small size but heavy construction make Flicka a very seaworthy and comfortable singlehander, with adequate space for a couple. (Layouts over the years have included two, three, and four berths.) Headroom is excellent for a 20-footer. The design is pretty, and attracts admiring attention wherever she goes. Worst features: Being very heavy for her length, she won't reach hull speed under sail until the wind pipes up."

A 2011 staff report in Sailing Magazine described the boat, "The Flicka is like Elvis or Prince, one word and you immediately draw a mental picture. Love it or dismiss it as a cutesy paean to tradition, it's impossible not to like the Flicka. A pocket cruiser with a big heart and impressive resume, it's a plodding beagle of a boat, small but adorable."

A 2016 review in Blue Water Boats described the design, "If you can get over the lack of deck space and finding place to stow your tender, you’ll find a boat that’s essentially solid, seaworthy and with the interior space of a boat 6 feet longer. She’s large enough to live in, and being so small she’s incredibly easy to handle. She sails well despite her short length and heavy displacement. These are some of the reasons people rationalize buying the Flicka 20, but perhaps the real reason is her charm and character; this little boat has quite the cult following."
