= Clipper 21 =

Sailboat class

Development
- Designer: William Crealock
- Location: United States
- Year: 1971
- Builder: Clipper Marine

Boat
- Displacement: 1,800 lb (816 kg)
- Draft: 4.33 ft (1.32 m) with keel down

Hull
- Type: monohull
- Construction: fiberglass
- LOA: 20.87 ft (6.36 m)
- LWL: 16.67 ft (5.08 m)
- Beam: 7.25 ft (2.21 m)
- Engine: outboard motor

Hull appendages
- Keel: swing keel
- Ballast: 410 lb (186 kg)
- Rudder: transom-mounted rudder

Rig
- Rig type: Bermuda rig
- I foretriangle height: 21.78 ft (6.64 m)
- J foretriangle base: 8.85 ft (2.70 m)
- P mainsail luff: 21.33 ft (6.50 m)
- E mainsail foot: 9.00 ft (2.74 m)

Sails
- Sailplan: fractional rigged sloop
- Mainsail area: 95.99 sq ft (8.918 m^{2})
- Jib/genoa area: 96.38 sq ft (8.954 m^{2})
- Total sail area: 192.36 sq ft (17.871 m^{2})

Racing
- PHRF: 270

The Clipper 21, also called the Clipper Marine 21 and the Clipper Mark 21, is an American trailerable sailboat that was designed by William Crealock and first built in 1971.

== Production ==
The design was built by Clipper Marine of Santa Ana, California, United States, from 1971 to 1977, but it is now out of production.

== Design ==
The Clipper 21 is a recreational keelboat, built predominantly of fiberglass, with wood trim. It has a fractional sloop or optional masthead sloop rig, a clipper bow, a plumb transom, a transom-hung rudder controlled by a tiller and a retractable swing keel. It displaces 1,800 lb (816 kg) and carries 410 lb (186 kg) of cast iron ballast. It has foam flotation, making it unsinkable. A version with a flush deck was also built.

The boat has a draft of 4.33 ft (1.32 m) with the keel extended and 0.54 ft (0.16 m) with it retracted, allowing beaching or ground transportation on a trailer.

The boat is normally fitted with a small 3 to 6 hp (2 to 4 kW) outboard motor for docking and maneuvering, mounted in an aft starboard well.

The design has sleeping accommodation for four people, with a double "V"-berth in the bow cabin and a two straight settee, quarter berths in the main cabin. The "V"-berth has a section that can be raised to provide an aft-facing settee back for seating. The galley is located on the port side just forward of the companionway ladder. The galley is equipped with just a counter and an optional sink. The optional, portable-type head is located opposite the galley on the starboard side. Cabin headroom is 45 in (110 cm).

The design has a PHRF racing average handicap of 270 and a hull speed of 5.7 kn (10.6 km/h).

== Operational history ==
In a 2010 review Steve Henkel wrote, "this vessel from the board of the well-known West Coast yacht designer William Crealock has a long, distinctive (and, to us, a somewhat weird-looking) clipper bow, a "trademark look" of Clipper, the company that built her, Best features: the Clipper 21's draft of only seven inches should make her relatively easy to launch and retrieve, Down below, a 'thwart-ships lifting seatback eases the problem of low headroom. The ads proclaim that she has enough foam flotation to be unsinkable, even with her interior full of water. Worst features: Construction quality is nothing to rave about on this lightly built boat, which was made to sell at a low target price - only $2,800 brand new in 1971 ... Her cast iron swing keel could be a maintenance problem, and the winch to raise and lower it is located inconveniently down in the cabin. A relatively narrow beam combined with below-average ballast weight will make her tender relative to her comp[etitor]s. On the deck just forward of her transom is a recess in the deck for clamping an outboard engine, but the placement of the recess appears to be too close to the centerline, so that the outboard rudder may be damaged by the engine's prop when turning hard to starboard. In addition, the ads say that the transom will accept a 25 hp engine which will drive the boat at 15 mph. Given the light structure of the boat, we would not attempt anything more than 5 or 6 hp if the boat were ours, and be content to make 5 or 6 knots maximum speed."

== See also ==
- List of sailing boat types

Related development

- Clipper 23
