= Pacific Seacraft 25 =

1970s US recreational keelboat

Pacific Seacraft 25-1
Development
- Designer: Henry Mohrschladt
- Location: United States
- Year: 1976
- No. built: 157 (both marks)
- Builder: Pacific Seacraft
- Role: Cruiser

Boat
- Displacement: 5,700 lb (2,585 kg)
- Draft: 3.33 ft (1.01 m)

Hull
- Type: monohull
- Construction: fiberglass
- LOA: 24.50 ft (7.47 m)
- LWL: 21.00 ft (6.40 m)
- Beam: 8.00 ft (2.44 m)
- Engine: Yanmar 8 hp (6 kW) diesel engine

Hull appendages
- Keel: modified long keel
- Ballast: 1,750 lb (794 kg)
- Rudder: keel-mounted rudder

Rig
- Rig type: Cutter rig
- I foretriangle height: 27.50 ft (8.38 m)
- J foretriangle base: 8.00 ft (2.44 m)
- P mainsail luff: 23.80 ft (7.25 m)
- E mainsail foot: 9.50 ft (2.90 m)

Sails
- Sailplan: cutter rig
- Mainsail area: 113.05 sq ft (10.503 m^{2})
- Jib/genoa area: 110.00 sq ft (10.219 m^{2})
- Total sail area: 223.05 sq ft (20.722 m^{2})

The Pacific Seacraft 25 is a recreational keelboat built by Pacific Seacraft in the United States from 1976 until 1981, with 157 boats built.

== Design ==
The Pacific Seacraft 25 is built predominantly of fiberglass, with wood trim. It has a simulated lapstrake canoe hull, a spooned raked stem, an angled transom, a keel-mounted rudder controlled by a tiller and a fixed modified long keel, with a cutaway forefoot. It displaces 5,700 lb (2,585 kg) and carries 1,750 lb (794 kg) of lead ballast.

The boat has a draft of 3.33 ft (1.01 m) with the standard keel.

The boat is fitted with a Japanese Yanmar diesel engine of 8 hp (6 kW) for docking and maneuvering. The fuel tank holds 16 U.S. gallons (61 L; 13 imp gal) and the fresh water tank has a capacity of 14 U.S. gallons (53 L; 12 imp gal).

The design has sleeping accommodation for four people, with a double "V"-berth in the bow cabin, a straight settee and a drop-down dinette table that converts to a berth in the main cabin. The galley is located on the starboard side just forward of the companionway ladder. The galley is equipped with a two-burner stove and a sink. The head is located just aft of the bow cabin on the port side. Cabin headroom is 60 in (152 cm).

The design has a hull speed of 6.0 kn (11.1 km/h).

== Variants ==
Pacific Seacraft 25-1 or Mark I
This model has a masthead sloop rig and a length overall of 24.50 ft (7.47 m).
Pacific Seacraft 25-2 or Mark II
This model has a bowsprit and a cutter rig, with a length overall of 27.93 ft (8.51 m).

== Reception ==
In a 2010 review Steve Henkel wrote, "this double-ender is reminiscent of a miniaturized version of the Scandinavian redningskoites of yore, and the mid-1920s derivative designs of Colin Archer and William ('Billy') Atkin. She is the first design Henry Mohrschladt drew for his new company, Pacific Seacraft, of which he was president ... Production of the 25 lasted only five years. Distinguishing characteristics include her lapstrake hull construction and her relatively tiny sailplan (SA/D is only 12.8; values below 16 are considered very low). Best features: We like her accommodations plan, perfect for one or two voyaging sailors. We enjoyed a similar arrangement in our Tartan 27. Worst features: Like her comp[etitor], the Cornish Crabber, the PS 25 lacks sufficient sail area to make her go well in light air. Because of her narrow ends and low freeboard, she also has a lower Space Index than any of her comp[etitor]s."

A review in Blue Water Boats described the design, "by modern standards the little 25-footer is considered quite slow, but to make up for this she is immensely strong and seaworthy, low maintenance, and perfectly capable of being trailered to a cruising ground of your choice. It's been said the Pacific Seacraft 25 looks much like a blend between fishing vessel and a ship's lifeboat encapsulating a traditional old world feel. Beneath the waterline is a full keel with a forefoot cutaway which blesses her with fine tracking abilities combined with a hefty rudder hung from the double-ender's stern post. The bottom of the keel has a long enough straight section to allow her to sit upright without nosing forwards should she be tied up while the tide is out."
