= Orion 27 =

Sailboat class

Development
- Designer: Henry Mohrschladt
- Location: United States
- Year: 1979
- Builder: Pacific Seacraft
- Role: Cruiser
- Name: Orion 27

Boat
- Displacement: 10,000 lb (4,536 kg)
- Draft: 4.00 ft (1.22 m)

Hull
- Type: monohull
- Construction: fiberglass
- LOA: 30.92 ft (9.42 m)
- LWL: 22.19 ft (6.76 m)
- Beam: 9.25 ft (2.82 m)
- Engine: inboard 15 hp (11 kW) diesel engine

Hull appendages
- Keel: long keel
- Ballast: 3,200 lb (1,451 kg)
- Rudder: internally-mounted spade-type rudder

Rig
- Rig type: cutter rig
- I foretriangle height: 36.75 ft (11.20 m)
- J foretriangle base: 13.75 ft (4.19 m)
- P mainsail luff: 31.00 ft (9.45 m)
- E mainsail foot: 12.25 ft (3.73 m)

Sails
- Sailplan: cutter rigged sloop
- Mainsail area: 189.88 sq ft (17.640 m^{2})
- Jib/genoa area: 252.66 sq ft (23.473 m^{2})
- Total sail area: 442.53 sq ft (41.112 m^{2})

The Orion 27 is an American sailboat that was designed by Henry Mohrschladt as a cruiser and first built in 1979.

The Orion 27 design was developed into the Orion 27-2 in 1981.

== Production ==
The design was built by Pacific Seacraft in the United States, from 1979 until 1981, but it is now out of production.

== Design ==
The Orion 27 is a recreational keelboat, built predominantly of fiberglass, with the decks having a plywood core, with wood trim. It has a masthead sloop, cutter rig or yawl rig, a raked stem with a bowsprit, an angled transom, an internally mounted spade-type rudder controlled by a wheel and a fixed long keel. It displaces 10,000 lb (4,536 kg) and carries 3,200 lb (1,451 kg) of lead ballast.

The boat has a draft of 4.00 ft (1.22 m) with the standard keel and is fitted with an inboard diesel engine of 15 hp (11 kW) for docking and maneuvering.

There are two interior arrangements, designated "A" and "C". Both have sleeping accommodation for five people, with a double "V"-berth in the bow cabin and an aft cabin with a single berth on the port side. The "A" has a drop-down U-shaped dinette, while the "C" has a two bench dinette table, which allows a bigger head with a shower. The galley is located on the starboard side, just forward of the companionway ladder. The galley is equipped with a two-burner stove and a double sink.

== Operational history ==
The boat is supported by an active class club, the Pacific Seacraft Orion 27 Club.

== Operational history ==
A review in Blue Water Boats, described the design as, "beautiful, strong, and capable". The review went on to say, "unsurprisingly for a Mohrschladt design, the Orion 27 has conservative lines. Under the waterline is a long keel with a forefoot cutaway to improve nimbleness and reduce wetted area. The sections carry the tried and true wine-glass shape. Don’t expect record setting pace with this kind of shape; think strong, safe, and good manners for heaving-to in the rough."

== See also ==
- List of sailing boat types
