= Vancouver 36 (Harris) =

Sailboat class

Development
- Designer: Robert B. Harris
- Location: United States
- Year: 1977
- No. built: 13
- Builders: Durbeck's Inc; Hidden Harbor Boatworks
- Name: Vancouver 36

Boat
- Displacement: 18,052 lb (8,188 kg)
- Draft: 5.00 ft (1.52 m)

Hull
- Type: Monohull
- Construction: Fiberglass
- LOA: 36.00 ft (10.97 m)
- LWL: 27.92 ft (8.51 m)
- Beam: 11.00 ft (3.35 m)
- Engine: Volvo 35 hp (26 kW) diesel engine

Hull appendages
- Keel: modified long keel
- Ballast: 8,000 lb (3,629 kg)
- Rudder: keel-mounted rudder

Rig
- Rig type: Bermuda rig

Sails
- Sailplan: Cutter rigged sloop
- Total sail area: 685.00 sq ft (63.639 m^{2})

The Vancouver 36 is an American sailboat that was designed by Robert B. Harris as a bluewater ocean cruiser and first built in 1977.

This boat design is often confused with the later and unrelated Tony Taylore-designed Vancouver 36 sailboat, which was built in the United Kingdom by Northshore Yachts, starting in 1989. The Harris design is usually appended with his name to differentiate it from the other design.

== Production ==
The design was built by Durbeck's Inc in Sarasota, Florida, United States, starting in 1977, until they went out of business in 1983. Hidden Harbor Boatworks, also in Sarasota, then produced the design until they too went out of business a few years later, in the late 1980s, ending production. A total of 13 boats were built.

Boats were factory-produced in three states of completion. Some were delivered to customers by road, as kits with the hull and deck joined. Some were delivered wit engines installed, so they could be motored home from the factory, while the majority were delivered complete, with interiors and ready-to-sail.

== Design ==
The Vancouver 36 is a recreational keelboat, built predominantly of fiberglass, with minimal teak wood trim above decks. Construction is of 1.25 in (3.2 cm) thick fiberglass, with an Airtex core. It has a cutter rig with aluminum spars, a raked stem, a canoe transom, a keel-mounted rudder controlled by a wheel and a fixed modified long keel, with a cutaway foot. It displaces 18,052 lb (8,188 kg) and carries 8,000 lb (3,629 kg) of ballast. A pilot house version was introduced in 1987.

The boat has a draft of 5.00 ft (1.52 m) with the standard keel fitted.

The boat is fitted with a Swedish Volvo MD 17 C diesel engine of 35 hp (26 kW) for docking and maneuvering. Reviewer Richard Jordan described the engine in this application as "woefully underpowered". The fuel tank holds 65 U.S. gallons (250 L; 54 imp gal) and the fresh water tank has a capacity of 140 U.S. gallons (530 L; 120 imp gal).

The design could be a completed with a number or different cabin plans. A typical one includes a large bow stateroom, with a double berth on the port side, a workbench on the port side, a large ensuite head with a shower. A settee berth to port and a pilot berth on the starboard side are provided in the main cabin for total sleeping accommodation for four people. The galley is to starboard aft, at the foot of the companionway way steps, and includes a three-burner stove and a 12 cu ft (0.34 m^{3}) icebox. A navigation station is provided to port. Unusually this cabin layout includes a fireplace. The bow has an anchor chain locker and a large sail locker. Aft of the companionway steps are a large sail locker, a wet locker and the engine compartment. The cabin sole is made from 2 in (5.1 cm)

Ventilation is provided by four deck hatches, plus two cowl vents.

The cockpit is small and seats four people, to make more room below decks. The mainsheet traveler is located on the cabin roof, sheeting mid-boom. The shrouds are mounted inboard and the genoa is sheeted outboard, at the toe-rail.

== Operational history ==
In a review Richard Sherwood wrote, "Robert Harris also designed the Vancouver 27, 32, and 42, but the first two are produced in England and the latter in Taiwan. The 36 has an unusual cabin layout. With a large space but only four bunks, she is designed for long-range cruising. Entry is fine, bilges are hard, and the maximum beam is well aft. Ballast/displacement ratio is 42 percent."

In a 2009 review Richard Jordan wrote, "this is a no nonsense tank – a boat that is meant to go places. Just slip the dock lines and head for the horizon … The 36 like her sisters is a bluewater cruiser, heavy and strong. She has a classic cruising look – a powerfully straight raked bow and canoe stern. Her lines are modest with a subtle sheer. Most notable in look is her stepped cabin trunk similar to the pilothouse deck mold of her 42-foot sistership and perforated aluminum toe rail. Her stern is thick and full bodied and not for everyone."

== See also ==
- List of sailing boat types

Similar sailboats

- Bayfield 36
- C&C 36-1
- C&C 36R
- Catalina 36
- Columbia 36
- Crealock 37
- CS 36
- Ericson 36
- Frigate 36
- Hunter 36
- Invader 36
- Nonsuch 36
- Portman 36
- S2 11.0
- Seidelmann 37
- Watkins 36
- Watkins 36C
