= Pacific Seacraft 44 =

Development
- Designer: W.I.B. Crealock
- Year: 1990 -
- Name: Pacific Seacraft 44

Boat
- Draft: 5' 3" (shoal), 6' 3" (standard)

Hull
- Type: Monohull yacht
- Hull weight: 27,500 lb
- LOA: 44' 1"
- LWL: 33' 7"
- Beam: 12' 8"

Hull appendages
- Keel: Fin

Rig
- Rig type: Bermudan cutter

Sails
- Total sail area: 976 ft^{2}

The Pacific Seacraft 44 is a bluewater cruising yacht produced since 1990 by Pacific Seacraft of Washington, North Carolina. Although of GRP construction, the yacht is traditionally built with a cutter rig, skeg-hung rudder, canoe stern and semi-long keel. The yacht is a cruising design, with a high displacement and the characteristic 'canoe' stern of Bill Crealock.

== See also ==
- Pacific Seacraft 40
