= Pacific Seacraft =

Pacific Seacraft Corporation is a Washington, North Carolina–based sailboat manufacturer specializing in fiberglass monohull cruising boats. Pacific Seacraft is best known for producing the Crealock line of sailboats. These are heavy, overbuilt offshore cruising designs designed by William Crealock. Crealocks are distinctive due to their overhanging 'canoe' sterns and traditional lines. Their sailboats have been featured in both volumes of Ferenc Máté's The World's Best Sailboats, and Fortune Magazine twice selected Pacific Seacraft as a producer of America's 100 best products.

== History ==
The company was founded by Mike Howarth and Henry Mohrschladt in 1975, with Mohrschladt as the first president. The first design produced was Mohrschladt's Pacific Seacraft 25. The company was later purchased by Singmarine Industries, a subsidiary of the Singapore-based Keppel Group.

After Ericson filed for bankruptcy in 1990, Pacific Seacraft built some Ericson sailboat models.

While headquartered in California, the company filed for Chapter 11 protection from its creditors in May 2007. The company's assets, with the exception of the Dana 24 molds which went to Portland, Oregon, were purchased at a bankruptcy auction September 2007 and moved in their entirety to Washington, North Carolina, along with some of the former employees. Production restarted in 2008 under the new ownership of marine-archeologist Stephen Brodie and his father Reid.

== Current models ==
- Pacific Seacraft 31 (1987-)
- Pacific Seacraft 34 (1984-)
- Pacific Seacraft 37 (1980-)
- Pacific Seacraft 40 (1997-)
- Pacific Seacraft 44 (1990-)

== Past models ==
- Flicka 20 (1978)
- Dana 24 (1974)
- Orion 27 (1979)
- Orion 27-2 (1981)
- Ericson 32-3/333 (1985/1990)
- Ericson 34/350 (1988/1990)
- Ericson 38/380 (1986/1990)
- Pacific Seacraft 25 (1976)
- Pacific Seacraft Mariah 31 (1977)
- Pacific Seacraft 377
- Pacific Seacraft Pilothouse 32
- Pacific Seacraft Trawler 38T
- Pacific Seacraft Pilothouse 40

== See also ==
- List of sailboat designers and manufacturers
