= Vancouver 25 =

1980s recreational keelboat

Development
- Designer: Robert B. Harris
- Location: Canada
- Year: 1983
- No. built: 28
- Builder: Vancouver 25 Yacht Company
- Role: Cruiser

Boat
- Displacement: 7,380 lb (3,348 kg)
- Draft: 4.00 ft (1.22 m)

Hull
- Type: monohull
- Construction: fibreglass
- LOA: 29.00 ft (8.84 m)
- LWL: 21.67 ft (6.61 m)
- Beam: 8.50 ft (2.59 m)
- Engine: Yanmar 1GM 15 hp (11 kW) diesel engine

Hull appendages
- Keel: long keel
- Ballast: 2,600 lb (1,179 kg)
- Rudder: keel-mounted rudder

Rig
- Rig type: Bermuda rig
- I foretriangle height: 33.60 ft (10.24 m)
- J foretriangle base: 11.10 ft (3.38 m)
- P mainsail luff: 28.80 ft (8.78 m)
- E mainsail foot: 13.50 ft (4.11 m)

Sails
- Sailplan: masthead sloop
- Mainsail area: 194.40 sq ft (18.060 m^{2})
- Jib/genoa area: 186.48 sq ft (17.325 m^{2})
- Total sail area: 380.39 sq ft (35.339 m^{2})

The Vancouver 25 is a recreational keelboat built in Taiwan under contract to the Vancouver 25 Yacht Company of Canada, starting in 1983. A total of 28 boats were completed, but it is now out of production.

Designed by Robert B. Harris, the fibreglass hull has a raked stem with a bowsprit, a rounded transom, with a boomkin, keel-mounted rudder controlled by a tiller and a fixed long keel. The design has a hull speed of 6.2 kn (11.5 km/h).

It has sleeping accommodation for four people, with a double "V"-berth in the bow cabin, a straight settee in the main cabin and an aft cabin with a single berth on the starboard side. The galley is located on the starboard side amidships. The galley is equipped with a two-burner stove and a sink. A navigation station is beside the companionway steps, on the port side. The head is located just aft of the bow cabin on the port side and includes a stand-up shower. Cabin headroom is 71 in (180 cm).

It has a masthead sloop rig.
