= Clipper 23 =

Sailboat class

Development
- Designer: William Crealock
- Location: United States
- Year: 1976
- Builders: Clipper Marine; Sawyer Marine

Boat
- Displacement: 2,025 lb (919 kg)
- Draft: 4.50 ft (1.37 m) with keel down

Hull
- Type: monohull
- Construction: fiberglass
- LOA: 22.67 ft (6.91 m)
- LWL: 18.75 ft (5.72 m)
- Beam: 7.67 ft (2.34 m)
- Engine: outboard motor

Hull appendages
- Keel: swing keel
- Ballast: 500 lb (227 kg)
- Rudder: transom-mounted rudder

Rig
- Rig type: Bermuda rig
- I foretriangle height: 24.75 ft (7.54 m)
- J foretriangle base: 9.03 ft (2.75 m)
- P mainsail luff: 21.33 ft (6.50 m)
- E mainsail foot: 9.00 ft (2.74 m)

Sails
- Sailplan: masthead sloop
- Mainsail area: 95.99 sq ft (8.918 m^{2})
- Jib/genoa area: 111.75 sq ft (10.382 m^{2})
- Total sail area: 207.73 sq ft (19.299 m^{2})

Racing
- PHRF: 258

The Clipper 23, also called the Clipper Marine 23, is an American trailerable sailboat that was designed by William Crealock and first built in 1976.

== Production ==
The design was initially built by Clipper Marine of Santa Ana, California, United States, starting in 1976. After that company went out of business in 1976 a twin-keel version was built by Sawyer Marine in Canada starting in 1984, but it is now out of production.

== Design ==
The Clipper 23 is a recreational keelboat, built predominantly of fiberglass, with wood trim. It has a masthead sloop rig, a clipper bow, a reverse transom, a transom-hung, non-folding rudder controlled by a tiller and a retractable swing keel or twin keels. It displaces 2,025 lb (919 kg) and carries 500 lb (227 kg) of cast iron ballast.

The boat has a draft of 4.50 ft (1.37 m) with the swing keel extended and 0.51 ft (0.16 m) with it retracted, allowing ground transportation on a trailer. The twin keel version has a draft of 2.17 ft (0.66 m).

The boat is normally fitted with a small 3 to 6 hp (2 to 4 kW) outboard motor for docking and maneuvering, mounted in an aft starboard well.

The boat was offered with a choice of two interior layouts, one with two straight settees and one with a dinette table. The latter design has sleeping accommodation for five people, with a double "V"-berth in the bow cabin, a straight settee berth that can be converted to a double with a drop table on the port side and a quarter berth on the starboard side of the main cabin. The head is located in the bow cabin on the port side. Cabin headroom is 52 in (130 cm). A cabin "pop-top" was optional.

The design has a PHRF racing average handicap of 258 and a hull speed of 5.8 kn (10.7 km/h).

== Operational history ==
In a 2010 review Steve Henkel wrote, "the Clipper 23, a boat with flare at the bow that gives it a pinched look ... Best features: These boats were constructed cheaply to sell cheaply, for those who wanted a plaything but didn't want to invest much. Today their price on the used market continues to be near the bottom of the range for this size and type of vessel. Worst features: If the brochure plans are accurate, the rudder, which is deeper than the keel and apparently has no retracting device when in shallow water, may be damaged if the boat goes aground."

== See also ==
- List of sailing boat types

Related development

- Clipper 21
