= Robert B. Harris =

American sailboat designer

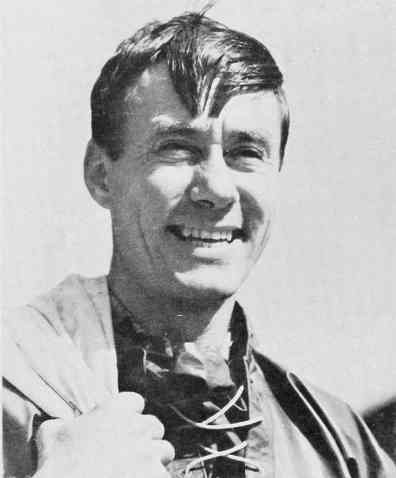
Robert B. Harris, before 1965.

Robert B. Harris (born 1922- died 2014) was an American multihull sailboat designer.

== Career ==
He first became interested in multihulls after seeing a 40-foot catamaran in Hawaii, built by Alfred Kumalai and Rudy Choy.

The first catamaran I saw was from Hawaii. Man, this thing was fast!

— Robert B. Harris

== Designs ==
Please note that this list is partial.

=== Monohulls ===
- Vancouver 25
- Vancouver 42
- Vancouver 36 (Harris) (1977)

=== Catamarans ===
- Naramatac (1948)
- Sunburner (1972)

=== Trimarans ===
- Eclipse

== Books ==
Harris published three books.

- 1960: Modern Sailing Catamarans
- 1970: Racing and Cruising Trimarans
- 2008: Tracks on the Water: My Life in Yacht Design
