= Dana 24 =

Sailboat class

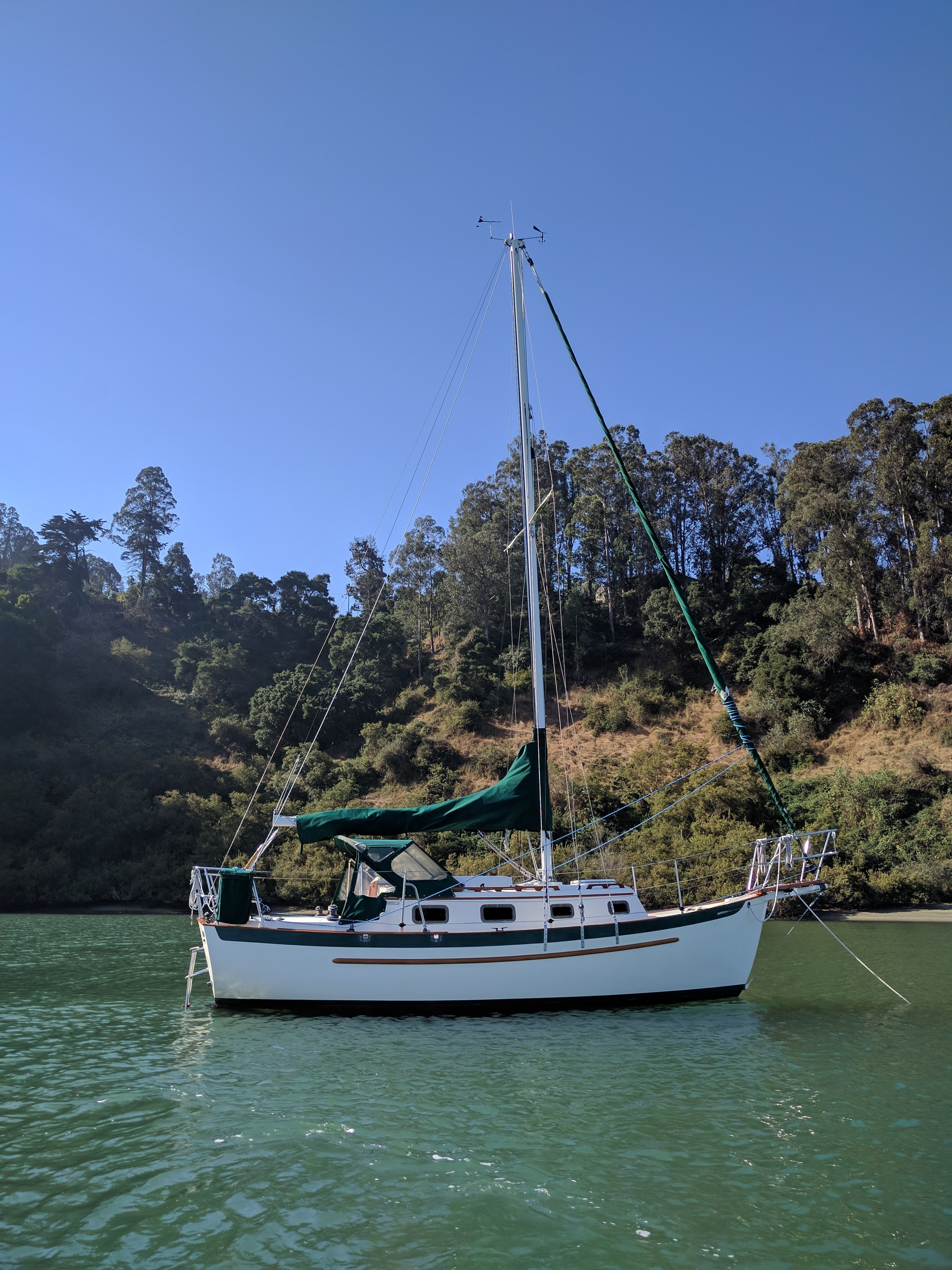

Development
- Designer: William Crealock
- Location: United States
- Year: 1984
- No. built: more than 250
- Builders: Pacific Seacraft, Seacraft Yachts
- Name: Dana 24

Boat
- Displacement: 7,400 lb (3,357 kg)
- Draft: 3.83 ft (1.17 m)

Hull
- Type: Monohull
- Construction: Fiberglass
- LOA: 24.16 ft (7.36 m)
- LWL: 21.42 ft (6.53 m)
- Beam: 8.58 ft (2.62 m)
- Engine: Yanmar 2GM20F 18 hp (13 kW) diesel engine

Hull appendages
- Keel: long keel
- Ballast: 3,100 lb (1,406 kg)
- Rudder: keel-mounted rudder

Rig
- Rig type: Bermuda rig
- I foretriangle height: 34.00 ft (10.36 m)
- J foretriangle base: 12.25 ft (3.73 m)
- P mainsail luff: 28.25 ft (8.61 m)
- E mainsail foot: 10.75 ft (3.28 m)

Sails
- Sailplan: Cutter rigged sloop
- Mainsail area: 151.84 sq ft (14.106 m^{2})
- Jib/genoa area: 208.25 sq ft (19.347 m^{2})
- Total sail area: 360.09 sq ft (33.453 m^{2})

Racing
- PHRF: 221

The Dana 24 is an American trailerable sailboat that was designed by William Crealock as an ocean cruiser and first built in 1974.

== Production ==
The design was built by Pacific Seacraft in the United States from 1984 to 1999, but the company went out of business in 2007. The design was acquired by Seacraft Yachts, who commenced building the design again, starting with serial number 351. Over 250 examples of the design have been completed.

== Design ==
The Dana 24 is a recreational keelboat, built predominantly of fiberglass, with wood trim. It has a cutter sloop rig, a spooned and slightly raked stem, a nearly vertical transom, a keel-mounted rudder controlled by a tiller, a bowsprit and a fixed long keel. It displaces 7,400 lb (3,357 kg) and carries 3,100 lb (1,406 kg) of ballast.

The boat has a draft of 3.83 ft (1.17 m) with the standard keel fitted. The boat is fitted with a Japanese Yanmar 2GM20F diesel engine of 18 hp (13 kW).

The boat's galley is located on the port side of the cabin and has a stainless steel sink and a two-burner gimballed kerosene stove. The table can swing up and stow when not in use. A second table stows under the forward "V"-berth. The head is a marine type, with a shower. It has a privacy door and is located aft on the starboard side. Additional sleeping space is provided by the dinette settees, which extend under the forward "V"-berth for extra leg room.

Ventilation is provided by a forward hatch and opening bronze ports. There is an anchor chain locker, just aft of the bowsprit.

The cockpit has two genoa winches and a mainsheet traveler, which is mounted at the transom.

The design has a PHRF racing average handicap of 221 and a hull speed of 6.2 kn (11.5 km/h).

In a review Richard Sherwood wrote, "This cruiser incorporates some ingenious interior details that help provide more space. The vee berth forward is not separated from the cabin, but has storage under. In addition, the table for the opposing settees is stored under the vee berth and slides out and around the compression post supporting the cabin-top mounted mast. The setees double as berths, and additional length is attained by extending the foot of the berths under the forward berth."

A 2008 review in Sailing Magazine note "Part of the Dana 24's appeal is its traditional appearance, from its beefy bow pulpit and sweet sheerline to the chrome bronze deck hardware and teak loop handrails on the cabinhouse. This classic feel extends belowdecks, where the saloon exudes the warmth of hand-rubbed oiled teak, with teak joinery and cabinets above a teak-and-holly sole."

A 2010 review note, "Bill Crealock the designer of the Dana was simply a genius. When he designed the Dana back in the early 1980s he was about 65 years old and he used all his hard earned experience gained from a lifetime of creating and sailing yachts. The Dana may well have been one of the last yachts designed without the aid of a computer."

In a 2010 review Steve Henkel wrote, "this boat was designed to be a diminutive offshore passagemaker, to safely carry a single-hander or small family cross a bay—or an ocean. The solid fiberglass laminate is one inch thick at the sheer and, it is claimed, gets thicker everywhere else. Her hull is heavy and her rig is on the modest side ... That's good for ocean sailing when the wind is blowing, but may cause consternation among the crew in areas where light air is the rule rather than the exception. The boat is elegantly finished, with heavy-duty rigging and quality hardware from Lewmar, Harken, and Schaefer. She is built to last. Best features: The layout below is very functional and has some clever special features. There is foot space for the settee berths under the V-berth, covered with cushions when not in use. During the day, bedding can be stored, hidden in the foot space. The dining table slides out from its hiding place in a slot under the V-berth, supported by the stainless steel mast strut when in use. The galley features everything you might need, including a gimballed stove with oven. Stowage space abounds, with both wet and dry hanging lockers, cabinets, drawers, and more, remarkable for this size boat. Worst features: Some light-air sailors may not like her low SA/D ratio."

In a 2016 review in Blue Water Boats, Rosie Mac wrote, "Like all good boats, the Dana 24 is well balanced, fast for her size and seakindly. Her shallow draft allows for exploration in cruising grounds larger yachts cannot, and her design, now over 25 years old, is well proven with a number of ocean crossings to her credit. Yet for all her offshore capabilities she is one of a select few that can go home on a trailer."
