= Allegra 24 =

Sailboat class

Development
- Designer: Fred Bingham and Lou Nagy
- Location: United States
- Year: 1984
- Builders: Matrix Marine/Wilmette Boat Works; Mestiza Yachts and others
- Role: Cruiser
- Name: Allegra 24

Boat
- Displacement: 6,200 lb (2,812 kg)
- Draft: 3.50 ft (1.07 m)

Hull
- Type: monohull
- Construction: fiberglass
- LOA: 23.92 ft (7.29 m)
- LWL: 20.83 ft (6.35 m)
- Beam: 8.00 ft (2.44 m)
- Engine: Inboard motor or outboard motor

Hull appendages
- Keel: long keel
- Ballast: 2,200 lb (998 kg)
- Rudder: keel-mounted rudder

Rig
- Rig type: cutter rig

Sails
- Sailplan: cutter rigged sloop
- Total sail area: 359 sq ft (33.4 m^{2})

The Allegra 24 is a recreational keelboat that was designed by Fred Bingham and Lou Nagy and based upon the work of Fred Bingham's son, Bruce Bingham. The boat is intended as a cruiser and was first built in 1984.

The Allegra 24 is a development of the smaller, Bruce Bingham-designed Flicka 20.

== Production ==
The design was built by a number of companies, including Matrix Marine/Wilmette Boat Works from fiberglass and also by Mestiza Yachts from wood, in the United States starting in 1984, but it is now out of production. Boats were built on a custom basis, to order and some were delivered as kits or as bare hulls for owner completion.

== Design ==
Fred Bingham took the Flicka 20 hull design and lengthened it by 4 ft (1.2 m), without increasing the beam.

The Allegra 24 is a built predominantly of biaxial glass/acrylic-epoxy resin pre-preg fiberglass, with PVC foam-cored decks and cabin tops, with wood trim. Some were also built from wood. It has a cutter rig, a spooned plumb stem, an angled transom, a keel-mounted rudder controlled by a tiller and a fixed long keel, with a cutaway forefoot. It displaces 6,200 lb (2,812 kg) and carries 2,200 lb (998 kg) of ballast.

The boat has a draft of 3.50 ft (1.07 m) with the standard keel.

The boat may be fitted with an inboard motor or an outboard motor of under 30 hp (22 kW) for docking and maneuvering. The outboard motor is mounted on an off-center transom bracket, to de-conflict with the rudder. The fuel tank holds 18 U.S. gallons (68 L; 15 imp gal).

The interior layout varies, but typical includes sleeping accommodation for four people, with a double "V"-berth in the bow cabin and two straight settees in the main cabin, with an extendable table. The galley is located on the starboard side just forward of the companionway ladder. The galley is equipped with a two-burner stove and a sink. The head is located opposite the galley on the port side. Cabin headroom is 73 in (190 cm).

For sailing the design is equipped with a jib and a genoa. The mainsheet is mid-cockpit. The design has a hull speed of 6.1 kn (11.3 km/h).

== Reception ==
In a 2010 review Steve Henkel described the boat's "best features: The cutter rig, with the staysail on a boom and the jib on a roller furler, help to make the boat an easy singlehander. Worst features: Relative to her comp[petitor]s, the Allegra is a lighter, less beamy boat, better in the lighter air along coastal waters but perhaps not as satisfactory offshore when the going gets rough."

A Blue Water Boats review noted, "under sail the Allegra 24 leaves all comparisons to the Flicka 20 behind. She's a fast boat, one of the fastest pocket cruisers in her class capable of exceeding hull speed quite easily and is a particularly strong performer in light winds. Next to the Flicka, she points higher, is nimble through the tacks, and is much better slicing through chop. Her bow flare and higher freeboard makes for a much drier ride and in following seas where the Flicka tends to squat in need of more stern buoyancy, the Allegra lifts well. A quick glance at her numbers reveal three feet more waterline length, 50% more sail area, despite a displacement that's in the same ballpark as the Flicka."
