= Orion 27-2 =

Sailboat class

Development
- Designer: Henry Mohrschladt
- Location: United States
- Year: 1981
- Builder: Pacific Seacraft
- Name: Orion 27-2

Boat
- Displacement: 10,000 lb (4,536 kg)
- Draft: 4.00 ft (1.22 m)

Hull
- Type: Monohull
- Construction: Fiberglass
- LOA: 27.33 ft (8.33 m), 30 ft (9.1 m) including the bowsprit
- LWL: 22.21 ft (6.77 m)
- Beam: 9.21 ft (2.81 m)
- Engine: Yanmar 27 hp (20 kW) diesel engine

Hull appendages
- Keel: long keel with cutaway forefoot
- Ballast: 3,300 lb (1,497 kg)
- Rudder: keel-mounted rudder

Rig
- Rig type: Cutter rig
- I foretriangle height: 36.75 ft (11.20 m)
- J foretriangle base: 13.75 ft (4.19 m)
- P mainsail luff: 31.00 ft (9.45 m)
- E mainsail foot: 12.25 ft (3.73 m)

Sails
- Sailplan: Cutter rig
- Mainsail area: 189.88 sq ft (17.640 m^{2})
- Jib/genoa area: 252.66 sq ft (23.473 m^{2})
- Total sail area: 442.53 sq ft (41.112 m^{2})

The Orion 27-2, also called the Orion 27 Mk II, is an American sailboat that was designed by Henry Mohrschladt as a cruiser and first built in 1981.

The design is a development of the Orion 27, with a longer cabin coach house roof to allow for the installation of an extra set of portlights.

== Production ==
The design was built by Pacific Seacraft from 1981 until 1993, but it is now out of production.

== Design ==
The Orion 27-2 is a recreational keelboat, built predominantly of plywood-cored fiberglass, with teak wood trim. It has an optional cutter rig as a sloop or a yawl, a raked stem, an angled transom, a keel-mounted rudder controlled by a wheel and a fixed long keel, with a cutaway forefoot. It displaces 10,000 lb (4,536 kg) and carries 3,300 lb (1,497 kg) of ballast. The design has a length overall of 27.33 ft (8.33 m), 30 ft (9.1 m) including the wooden planked. platform-mounted, teak bowsprit, with dual Sampson posts. A yawl rig was optional. The hull cross-section is a traditional "wineglass" shape.

The boat has a draft of 4.00 ft (1.22 m) with the standard keel fitted. The boat is fitted with a Japanese Yanmar 2GMF diesel engine of 27 hp (20 kW). The fuel tank holds 20 U.S. gallons (76 L; 17 imp gal).

The boat has two interior configurations. The first has a U-shaped dinette table and a navigation station aft of the dinette. The second layout is intended for longer-ranged cruising and has a smaller dinette table, which makes room for a wet locker at the foot of the companionway stairs. Space in the bow can be used for stowage or an optional cabin heater. In both configurations the galley is located on the starboard side of the cabin. There is a "V"-berth in the bow. The head is equipped with a shower, has a privacy door and is located forward, just aft of the bow "V"-berth. Additional sleeping space is provided by quarter berth in the cabin.

The deck has teak capped bulwarks. Ventilation is provided by a cabin hatch, two dorade vents and ten opening and screened ports.

The boat has two genoa winches and two winches for the halyards. The mainsheet traveler is mounted on the coach house roof.

== Operational history ==
The boat is supported by an active class club, the Pacific Seacraft Orion 27 Club.

A review in Blue Water Boats, described the design as, "beautiful, strong, and capable". The review went on to say, "unsurprisingly for a Mohrschladt design, the Orion 27 has conservative lines. Under the waterline is a long keel with a forefoot cutaway to improve nimbleness and reduce wetted area. The sections carry the tried and true wine-glass shape. Don’t expect record setting pace with this kind of shape; think strong, safe, and good manners for heaving-to in the rough."

== See also ==
- List of sailing boat types

Similar sailboats

- Aloha 27
- Cal 27
- Cal 2-27
- Cal 3-27
- C&C 27
- Crown 28
- CS 27
- Edel 820
- Express 27
- Fantasia 27
- Halman Horizon
- Hotfoot 27
- Hullmaster 27
- Irwin 27
- Island Packet 27
- Mirage 27 (Perry)
- Mirage 27 (Schmidt)
- Mirage 275
- O'Day 272
- Watkins 27
- Watkins 27P
