= Lehg II =

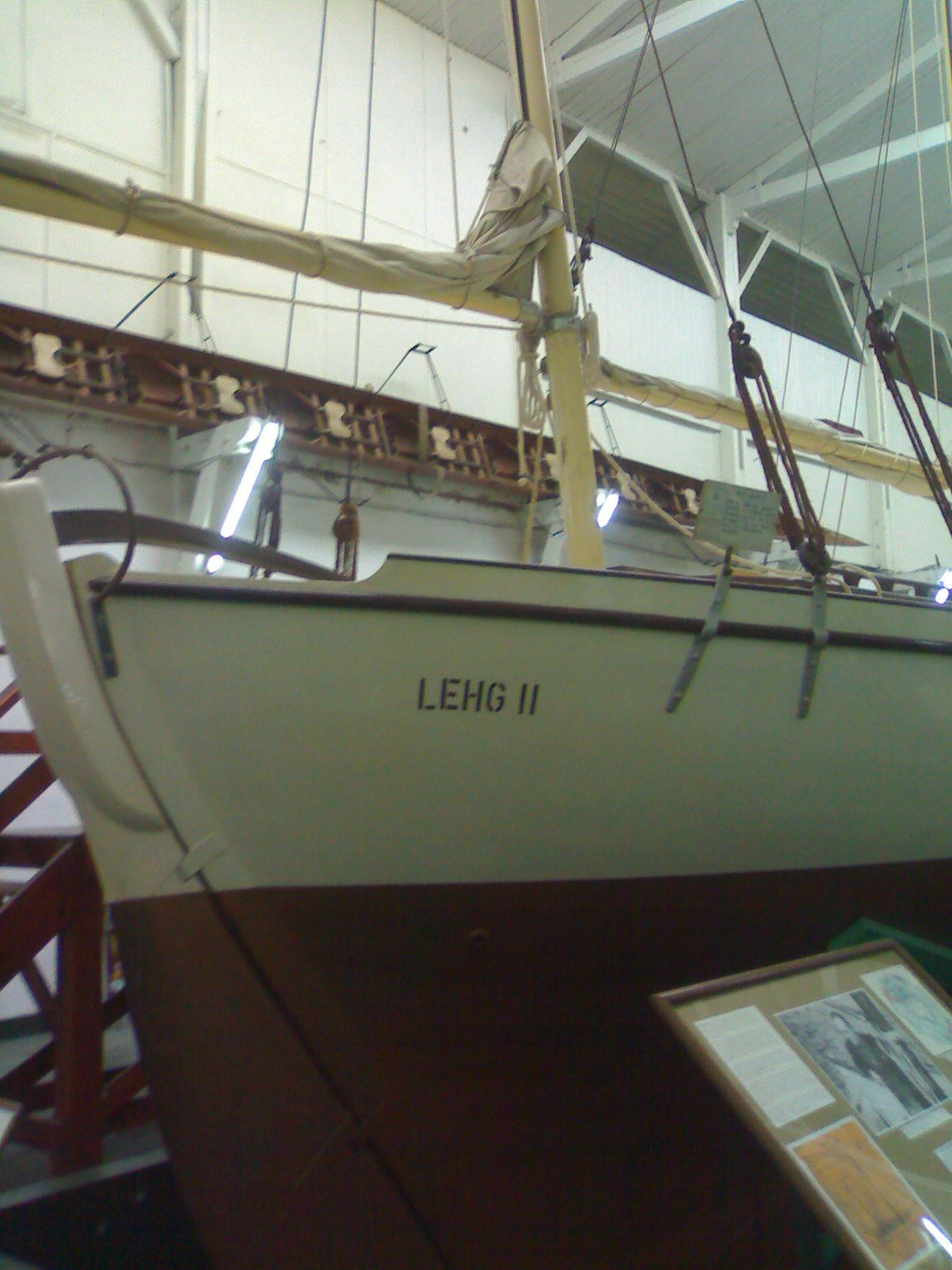
- Lehg II on display at the Museo Naval de Tigre

History

Argentina
- Name: Lehg II
- Owner: Vito Dumas
- Launched: 1934
- Status: Museum ship

General characteristics
- Type: Ketch
- Length: 31 ft 2 in (9.50 m)
- Beam: 10 ft 9 in (3.28 m)
- Depth: 5 ft 7 in (1.70 m)

Lehg II is a 31-foot-2-inch (9.50 m) ketch that was sailed around the world in 1942 by Argentine Vito Dumas. The name Lehg was based on the initials of "four names which marked my life", according to Dumas.

== History ==
Dumas sailed easterly from Buenos Aires, around the world past the three great capes in a voyage lasting 272 days, making seven ports of call. He became the first single-handed sailor to circumnavigate the three great capes. He later sailed Lehg II from Buenos Aires to New York and back, a voyage of 17,000 miles.

The vessel is preserved at the Naval Museum in Tigre, Buenos Aires, Argentina.

== Design ==
Lehg II was designed in 1933 by the Argentine naval architect Manuel M. Campos, and built in 1934 in Argentina. He based it on traditional Norwegian double-ended designs, noting contemporary popular designs by naval architects Bill Atkins and Colin Archer, as well as traditional Rio de la Plata whaleboats. The beam was 10 feet 9 inches, the depth 5 feet 7 inches. The vessel was constructed from Argentine woods. The rig was Marconi Bermuda rig ketch.
