= W. I. B. Crealock =

W.I.B. Crealock

William Ion Belton Crealock (23 August 1920 – 26 September 2009) was a yacht designer and author. He was one of the world's leading yacht designers from the 1960s through the 1990s, and his yachts were owned by the famous and wealthy, including Walter Cronkite and William Hurt.

== Early years ==
Crealock was born in Westcliff-on-Sea, Essex, England in 1920. He attended the Glasgow University where he studied naval architecture and worked at the Glasgow shipyard during World War II.

== "Vagabonding Under Sail" ==
In 1948, Crealock and three friends pooled their money, purchased an old cutter, and set out "to study the behavior of boats at sea." Crealock arrived in the United States after "an unhurried two-year journey" in a small sailboat. Crealock wrote about his adventures sailing with his friends in his first book, "Vagabonding Under Sail." Crealock's second book, "Towards Tahiti" (published elsewhere as "Cloud of Islands") relates the story of a lengthy cruise from Panama, via the Galapagos, to the South Pacific. On this cruise Crealock sailed on the ketch "Arthur Rogers," a Brixham trawler built in 1929, with its owners Tom and Diana Hepworth. The Hepworths later life in the Solomon Islands is documented in the book "Faraway" by Lucy Irvine.

In 1956 and 1957, Crealock was the first mate and navigator on a scientific mission aboard the "Gloria Maris," a 110-foot schooner. The mission was commissioned by the National Science Foundation to study the shells of the Pacific Ocean. In February 1957, the schooner was caught in a typhoon in the South China Sea which rolled the ship to 60 degrees to starboard and put the water level halfway up the wooden deck. Crealock recalled being forced to leave the deck at 1 am, telling the skipper, "There's no use going topside." The wind tore the main mast from the deck, and Crealock concluded it would be suicide to go on deck; the schooner dragged the mast for 24 hours through the typhoon before it broke loose.

== Yacht designer ==
In 1959, Crealock began a career as a small boat designer in Southern California. In the 1960s, his fiberglass designs made boats quicker, less expensive to build, and easier to handle. He designed boats for celebrities, including Walter Cronkite, William Hurt, and Claire Trevor. He also became friends with celebrities, including Rock Hudson, Jane Russell, and Natalie Wood, through their interest in boating.

In 1986, The San Diego Union wrote that, in local yachting circles, Crealock's name was almost as well known as that of the America's Cup champion, Dennis Conner. Crealock said at the time that naval architecture was for people who love boats and boating: "We do it for a living, because if we didn't, we'd probably be doing it on the backs of envelopes." He noted that he had started in Glasgow designing parts of large ships and found the design of yachts a more satisfying profession: "I soon realized it was not very romantic to spend several weeks designing one bulkhead on a big ship. So I started big and edged my way down to pleasure boats, which was what I really wanted to do, because in small boats you do the whole thing." Crealock described the factors he considers in designing a boat:

"Seaworthiness in a cruising boat has to be the No. 1 consideration. It doesn't matter how cute the boat is if it doesn't get (the cruisers to their destination) in one piece ... Just about any boat does well in Southern California. A bathtub would do fairly well. But when things get bad, when it's blowing hard and rough, that's when the difference between boats shows up most. But beyond safety, you must give up in some areas to achieve in others. The boat must be aesthetically pleasing to the owner and not too slow – nobody likes a slow boat. But you can't take a camper and put it on a Ferrari and say you have the ideal combination."

In 1975, Bill Crealock designed the longest, lightest, trailerable Masthead ketch sailboat ever built, the Clipper Marine 32 Aft Cabin Ketch coastal diesel cruiser racer. About 100 of these sailboats were built in 1975 and 76, and many still sail the waters of the world today. CM32's had an 8-foot beam and 4,500 displament, were supplied with a two or three axle trailer that could be pulled by the family vehicle, put his design in the record books. A heavier displacement blue water CM32 was also built, and was also trailerable, sold in an aft cockpit single mast sloop. A smaller designed CM 30, a 30-foot motorsailor was also offered.

In 1976, he designed the Willard 8-Ton World Cruising Yacht, a blue water yacht for long-distance cruising, for the Willard Company. Crealock's other well-known designs included the Westsail 42, the Crealock 34 and 37, the Pacific Seacraft 31 and the Dana 24.

In 2002, the Pacific Seacraft 37, designed by Crealock, was inducted into the American Sailboat Hall of Fame.

Crealock said the most unusual vessel he was ever commissioned to design was a large bottle. He recalled, "A guy sitting inside was to cruise it down the coast off the beaches to advertise a soft drink. It was never built, fortunately." Crealock did not own a boat himself, saying he had no time to sail one. However, he enjoyed participating in sea trials of the boats he designed, joking that he did so "just to show I'm not afraid the boat's going to sink."

Crealock died at his home in Carlsbad, California, in September 2009. He was survived by his wife, Lynne (Banner) Crealock, a daughter, a stepson and a grandson.

== Designs ==
- Cabo Rico 34
- Cabo Rico 36
- Cabo Rico 38
- Clipper 21
- Clipper 23
- Clipper 26
- Clipper 32
- Columbia 22
- Columbia 28
- Columbia 36
- Coronado 23
- Crealock 37
- Dana 24
- Del Rey 50
- Irving & Exy Johnson
- Pacific Seacraft 31
- Pacific Seacraft 34
- Pacific Seacraft 37
- Pacific Seacraft 40
- Pacific Seacraft 44
- Westsail 32
- Westsail 42
