= Vito Dumas =

Argentine solo sailor and adventurer

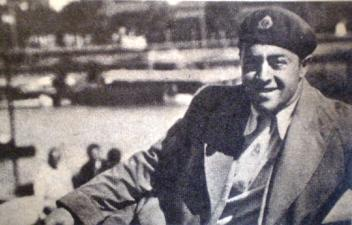
- Born: September 26, 1900; Buenos Aires, Argentina
- Died: March 28, 1965 (aged 64)
- Known for: Single-handed circumnavigation of the Southern Ocean

Vito Dumas (Buenos Aires, Argentina, September 26, 1900 – March 28, 1965) was a prominent Argentine solo sailor and adventurer, known for his remarkable achievements in long-distance single-handed sailing. Dumas excelled in various fields, including swimming, athletics, photography, painting, and writing. However, it was his indomitable spirit and unparalleled solo sailing expeditions that truly distinguished him as one of the greatest solo navigators of all time.

Dumas was the first person to circumnavigate the globe solo along the treacherous "southern route." This route, previously considered impassable since the 16th century when European explorers set sail, came to be known as the "roaring forties" – a circumnavigation along the 40th parallel in the southern hemisphere, unobstructed by land masses and subjected to the relentless onslaught of fierce winds and monumental waves. Admirable sailors such as Bernard Moitessier, Robin Knox Johnston, and Francis Chichester regarded Dumas as a "Maestro" in the art of navigating through tempestuous conditions.

== The First Voyage ==
On December 13, 1931, having never sailed on the open sea before, he departed from Arcachon, France, in his boat, the Lehg, built in France in 1918, to the 8 metre rule, approximately 15 meters long and 2.15 meters beam. He sailed 4,500 nautical miles (8,300 km) alone. While asleep, he ran aground near Rio Grande do Sul, where he was rescued by the Brazilian Navy. With the wood of the Lehg already rotten, he arrived in Buenos Aires on April 13, 1932. After 121 days at sea, he docked on March 12, 1932, at the Yacht Club Argentino in Buenos Aires.

== Single-handed circumnavigation through the Roaring Forties. ==
On 27 June 1942, while the world was in the depths of World War II, he set out on a single-handed circumnavigation of the Southern Ocean. He left Buenos Aires in June, sailing LEHG II, a 31-foot ketch. The name was an acronym representing "four names which marked my life". He had only the most basic and makeshift gear; he had no radio, for fear of being shot as a spy, and was forced to stuff his clothes with newspaper to keep warm.

With only three landfalls, the legs of his trip were the longest that had been made by a single-hander, and in the most ferocious oceans on the Earth; but most of all, it was a powerful retort to a world which had chosen to divide itself by war. He recounted the experience in his book Los Cuarenta Bramadores: La Vuelta al Mundo Por la "Ruta Imposible" (literally The Roaring Forties: Around the World Via the "Impossible Route").

He donated his boat to the Argentine Navy for training, but after a few years it was neglected, and was finally wrecked against a pier at the entrance of the port of La Plata in 1966. A wealthy Argentine yachtsman paid to have it restored and donated it to the Argentina Naval Museum in Tigre, a coastal river town on a backwater of the River Plate. LEHG II is now on display in Tigre, a short train ride from Buenos Aires.

Dumas was the inspiration for an Argentine tango entitled Navegante, written by Jaime Yanin (music) and José Horacio Staffolani (lyrics). It was recorded in Buenos Aires on 5 August 1943 by the Orquesta típica of Carlos di Sarli, featuring Roberto Rufino on vocals.

== Books ==
Dumas documented his extraordinary voyages in four books: Sólo rumbo a la Cruz del Sur (Heading towards the Southern Cross alone), Los cuarenta bramadores (Alone through the Roaring Forties), El crucero de lo imprevisto (The cruise of the unexpected), and El viaje del Sirio (The journey of the Sirius). These captivating accounts of his maritime escapades have been translated into numerous languages, with The Roaring Forties now considered a timeless classic in nautical literature.

== Achievements ==
Dumas embarked on daring voyages that were deemed impossible, not only due to the challenging routes he chose but also because of the demanding sailing conditions he faced. He braved the vast seas in small wooden boats, devoid of any modern conveniences such as motors, electricity, or crew. These formidable challenges did not deter him but rather fueled his determination to conquer the elements.

Throughout his expeditions, Dumas encountered myriad hardships. He battled hurricanes, suffered from scurvy and severe infections, endured scarcity of water and food supplies, and faced perilous encounters with whales. His unwavering resolve was tested to the extreme, as he was willing to sacrifice his own limb to save his life. At one point, he contemplated opening the floodgates of his vessel, willing to sink and end his protracted struggle in the vast and unforgiving ocean.

== Awards ==
Dumas received several accolades and honors throughout his nautical career. His expeditions garnered worldwide attention, gracing the pages of newspapers, magazines, and news programs, both within and beyond the maritime sphere. He was bestowed with some of the highest distinctions in various countries, and his legendary status was immortalized in popular songs, comic strips, and films.

In recognition of his pioneering contributions to solo navigation, Vito Dumas was honored by the Cruising Club of America with the prestigious Blue Water Medal, awarded "Without Date".

== Legacy ==
Some decades after his journeys, Vito Dumas continues to be remembered within the nautical community and remains a prominent figure. His achievements inspire sailors and adventurers worldwide.
