= Crealock 37 =

Sailboat class

Development
- Designer: W. I. B. Crealock
- Location: United States
- Year: 1978
- Builders: Cruising Consultants Inc. Pacific Seacraft
- Role: Cruiser
- Name: Crealock 37

Boat
- Displacement: 16,200 lb (7,348 kg)
- Draft: 5.50 ft (1.68 m)

Hull
- Type: Monohull
- Construction: Fiberglass
- LOA: 36.92 ft (11.25 m)
- LWL: 27.75 ft (8.46 m)
- Beam: 10.82 ft (3.30 m)
- Engine: Volvo 32 hp (24 kW) or Yanmar 4JH2E 51 hp (38 kW) diesel engine

Hull appendages
- Keel: fin keel
- Ballast: 6,200 lb (2,812 kg)
- Rudder: skeg-mounted rudder

Rig
- Rig type: Bermuda rig
- I foretriangle height: 44.00 ft (13.41 m)
- J foretriangle base: 15.80 ft (4.82 m)
- P mainsail luff: 38.20 ft (11.64 m)
- E mainsail foot: 14.30 ft (4.36 m)

Sails
- Sailplan: Masthead sloop
- Mainsail area: 273.13 sq ft (25.375 m^{2})
- Jib/genoa area: 347.60 sq ft (32.293 m^{2})
- Total sail area: 620.73 sq ft (57.668 m^{2})

Racing
- PHRF: 174 (average)

The Crealock 37, also called the Pacific Seacraft 37, is an American sailboat that was designed by British naval architect W. I. B. Crealock as a cruiser and first built in 1978.

In 2002, the boat was admitted to the American Sailboat Hall of Fame.

== Production ==
The design was initially commissioned and intended to be built by Clipper Marine in the United States, as the Clipper Marine 37, but the company went out of business before production commenced.

In 1978 the design was produced by Cruising Consultants Inc. of Newport Beach, California, under the name Crealock 37.

In 1980 the design was acquired and put into production by Pacific Seacraft of Washington, North Carolina as the Pacific Seacraft 37 and it remained in production in 2020.

== Design ==
The Crealock 37 is a recreational keelboat, built of fiberglass, with wood trim. It has a masthead sloop rig, with an optional cutter rig or yawl rig, with a mizzen mast. It features a raked stem, a raised canoe transom, a skeg-mounted rudder controlled by a wheel and a fixed fin keel. It displaces 16,200 lb (7,348 kg) and carries 6,200 lb (2,812 kg) of lead ballast.

The boat has a draft of 5.50 ft (1.68 m) with the standard keel and 4.92 ft (1.50 m) with the optional shoal draft keel.

The boat is fitted with a Volvo 32 hp (24 kW) or, on later models, a Yanmar 4JH2E 51 hp (38 kW) diesel engine for docking and maneuvering. The fuel tank holds 40 U.S. gallons (150 L; 33 imp gal) and the fresh water tank has a capacity of 95 U.S. gallons (360 L; 79 imp gal).

The design has sleeping accommodation for up to seven people. There is an angled "V" berth in the bow, a double and single settee berth in the main salon and a double berth in the stern, along with a quarter berth. The galley is located at the foot of the companionway steps, on the starboard side. It includes a double sink, a three-burner stove and oven and a top-loading refrigerator. The head is located forward, just aft of the bow cabin, on the starboard side and includes a shower. A navigation station is provided aft, on the port side. The design has below deck headroom of 75 in (191 cm). Ventilation is provided by two cabin hatches.

The jib is sheeted to short jib tracks. The mainsheet traveler is mounted on the coach house roof, as are three winches. There are also two primary jib winches mounted on the cockpit coamings.

The design has a PHRF racing average handicap of 174.

== Operational history ==
The design was named to the American Sailboat Hall of Fame in 2002. The citation says, in part, "The Pacific Seacraft 37 is a classic American sailboat with an honesty of design that, combined with the highest standards of boatbuilding as attested to by ABS certification for hull and deck construction and CE certification for unlimited offshore use, has shown the sailing industry that there is a place in the hearts and budgets of sailors for a boat created expressly to go to sea and bring the crew back safely."

In a 1994 review Richard Sherwood wrote that the "underwater lines show a very normal fin keel, but the canoe stern is unusual. The cutter rig shown does not indicate stay sails, Maximum beam is aft."

John Kretschmer wrote in a 2008 review for Sailing Magazine, "downwind, the cutter is not particularly efficient, and some type of drifter or cruising spinnaker is necessary to maintain speed in light air. When the wind pipes ups, the 37 finds its stride, even when a large sea is running. Several owners have reported touching double digits while surfing down trade wind seas. Long passages that average better than 150 miles per day are common. However, the most underrated performance factor is seakindliness, as nothing wears out the crew or the gear faster than a quick, pounding motion. The Pacific Seacraft 37 is a "swisher" not a "pounder."".

In a 2011 review in Cruising World, Jeremy McGeary wrote, "it was built as a cutter and as a yawl. I fear the yawl might be a bit busy around the cockpit. I like the cutter rig for its versatility upwind and reaching. I’d dispense with a big genoa and use a modern asymmetric for extra downwind sail area."

== See also ==
- List of sailing boat types

Similar sailboats

- CS 36
- Hinterhoeller F3
- Hunter 36 Vision
- Nonsuch 36
- Portman 36
- S2 11.0
- Seidelmann 37
- Vancouver 36 (Harris)
- Watkins 36
- Watkins 36C
