= 2018 Golden Globe Race =

2018 solo round-the-world sailing race

Event title
- Edition: 2nd

Event details
- Venue: Les Sables-d'Olonne
- Dates: 1 July 2018 – May 2019
- Yachts: 'Retro' fibreglass 32-36ft
- Key people: Don McIntyre, Race Chairman; Patrice Carpentier, Race Director

Competitors
- Competitors: 18

Results
- (gold) Gold: Jean-Luc Van Den Heede
- (silver) Silver: Mark Slats
- (bronze) Bronze: Uku Randmaa

The 2018 Golden Globe Race was an around-the-world sailing race founded by Australian adventurer and circumnavigator, Don McIntyre. The race started on 1 July 2018 from Les Sables-d'Olonne, France as the second edition and 50th anniversary celebration of the original Sunday Times Golden Globe Race. It featured yachts similar to those used at that time. Except for safety equipment, no modern technology was allowed.

== Retro sailing ==
Entrants are limited to sailing similar yachts and equipment to what was available to Sir Robin Knox-Johnston, the winner of the original race in 1968–69. That means sailing without the use of modern technology such as satellite-based navigation aids. Safety equipment such as EPIRBs and AIS are carried, however the competitors are only allowed to use the technology in an emergency.

Competitors could apply to have their class of boat approved, providing it was in accordance with the following rules:

- Of fibre reinforced plastic construction.
- Designed prior to 1988 and have a minimum series of 20 yachts built from one mould.
- Have a hull length of between 32 and 36 feet (9.8 and 11.0 m). Bowsprits, wind vanes and outboard rudders, boomkins, pushpits and pulpits are not measured.
- Have full-length keels with rudders attached to the trailing edge.
- A minimum design displacement of 6,200 kilograms (13,700 lb)

Twenty-two boats were approved, with one exception to the rules made for a wood-epoxy Suhaili replica (the Suhaili being the yacht that Knox-Johnston sailed in 1968).

== Route ==
The race started on 1 July 2018 in Les Sables-d'Olonne and led around the world eastward, leaving Cape of Good Hope, Cape Leeuwin and Cape Horn to port. There were several "film gates" along the route, where the skippers could be interviewed as they sailed past without stopping and where they passed over films and letters.

== Entrants ==
18 entrants from 13 different countries entered the race. Of those, six chose the class-compliant but relatively modern Rustler 36. A further 17 had expressed interest but never started.

Sailor	Yacht	Type
(India) Abhilash Tomy	Thuriya	Suhaili replica
(France) Antoine Cousot	Métier Intérim	Biscay 36
(Norway) Are Wiig	Olleanna	OE 32
(United Kingdom) Ertan Beskardes	Lazy Otter	Rustler 36
(Italy) Francesco Cappelletti	007	Endurance 35
(Republic of Ireland) Gregor McGuckin	Hanley Energy Endurance	Biscay 36
(Russia) Igor Zaretskiy	Esmeralda	Endurance 35
(United States) Istvan Kopar	Puffin	Tradewind 35
(France) Jean-Luc Van Den Heede	Matmut	Rustler 36
(Australia) Kevin Farebrother	Sagarmatha	Tradewind 35
(France) Loïc Lepage	Laaland	Nicholson 32
(Australia) Mark John Sinclair	Coconut	Lello 34
(Netherlands) Mark Slats	Ohpen Maverick	Rustler 36
(Palestine) Nabil Amra	Liberty II	Biscay 36
(France) Philippe Péché	PRB	Rustler 36
(United Kingdom) Susie Goodall	DHL Starlight	Rustler 36
(Finland) Tapio Lehtinen	Asteria	Benello Gaia 36
(Estonia) Uku Randmaa	One and All	Rustler 36

Type	Entrants	Finished	Hull speed (Gerr)*	Sail area/displacement ratio
Rustler 36	6	3	6.7	13.4
Biscay 36	3	0	6.9	14.6
Tradewind 35	2	1	5.8	12.3
Endurance 35	2	0	6.4	16.8
Benello Gaia 36	1	1	6.4	14.0
Lello 34	1	0	7.5	13.4
Nicholson 32	1	0	6.1	14.3
OE32	1	0	7.4	13.8
Suhaili replica	1	0	6.6	14.7

* Adjusted for displacement per Dave Gerr's formula

== The race ==
The race started at 10:00 GMT on 1 July 2018, with the competitors passing a rolling gate between the Suhaili and the Joshua, two yachts that competed in the 1968 race. Sir Robin Knox-Johnston, who sailed on the Suhaili and won that race, fired the starting cannon.

Of the 18 entrants, Francesco Cappelletti did not start the race and officially withdrew on 5 July. He plans to sail around the world independently and the race organisers are tracking his progress. Ertan Beskardes retired on 5 July, after deciding that being unable to communicate with his family removed the enjoyment from the race. Kevin Farebrother retired on 15 July at the Canary Islands mark, after becoming disillusioned by solo sailing and lack of sleep. Two days later, Nabil Amra retired at the same area on 17 July due to broken windvane gear. Antoine Cousot stopped at the Canary islands to repair his windvane gear, demoting him to the 'Chichester' class (one stop). Istvan Kopar put in to the Cape Verde islands on 23 July, planning to replace his windvane, but in the event proceeded without assistance.

Antoine Cousot retired at the end of August due to a broken windvane and injuries. Philippe Péché made one stop ('Chichester' class) on 11 August following the failure of his tiller, but retired from the race two weeks later on 25 August.

Are Wiig was dismasted on 17 August 400 nautical miles off Cape Town.

Abhilash Tomy was dismasted and injured on 22 September. Gregor McGuckin elected to abandon his boat after being dismasted and was rescued with Abhilash.

On 5 December 2018, Susie Goodall's boat was pitch-poled (flipped end-over-end), dismasted, and swamped during a storm while in the Southern Ocean around 2,000 nautical miles (3,700 km; 2,300 mi) west of Cape Horn. She was rescued by the cargo ship Tian Fu on 7 December.

Sailor	Cape of Good Hope	Storm Bay Tasmania gate	Cape Horn	Finish
(France) Jean-Luc Van Den Heede	23 August	5 October	23 November	29 January
(Netherlands) Mark Slats	27 August	21 October	2 December	31 January
(Estonia) Uku Randmaa	31 August	27 October	19 December	10 March
(United States) Istvan Kopar	9 September	4 November	1 January	21 March
(Finland) Tapio Lehtinen	9 September	7 November	6 February	19 May
Retired (in order of retirement)
(Italy) Francesco Cappelletti	Did not start, officially retired 5 July 2018			
(United Kingdom) Ertan Beskardes	Retired on 5 July 2018 due to inability to communicate with his family. Put in to A Coruña.			
(Australia) Kevin Farebrother	Retired on 15 July 2018, 'disillusioned by solo sailing and lack of sleep'			
(Palestine) Nabil Amra	Retired on 17 July 2018 due to broken windvane, put in to Tenerife			
(France) Antoine Cousot	Retired on 24 August 2018 due to broken windvane and injuries			
(France) Philippe Péché	Retired on 25 August 2018 due to broken windvane, put in to Cape Town			
(Norway) Are Wiig	Retired on 27 August 2018 after capsizing and dismasting while repairing his windvane			
(India) Abhilash Tomy	Retired on 24 September 2018 after dismasting near Île Amsterdam			
(Republic of Ireland) Gregor McGuckin	Retired on 24 September 2018 after dismasting near Île Amsterdam			
(France) Loïc Lepage	Retired on 21 October 2018 after dismasting 600 miles south-west of Perth (was already in 'Chichester' class)			
(United Kingdom) Susie Goodall	Retired on 5 December 2018 after dismasting 2000 miles west of the southern tip of South America			
(Australia) Mark John Sinclair	Retired on 12 December 2018, put in to Adelaide on 5 December for haulout due to severe barnacle/mussel growth, and with issues with fresh water, and concerned he would reach Cape Horn too late in the season. In December 2021, Sinclair left Adelaide to sail to the UK to 'complete' the 2018 race, and compete in GGR2022.			
(Russia) Igor Zaretskiy	Retired			

== Golden Globe Race 2022 ==
2022 race logo

The 2022 edition of the Golden Globe Race started on 4 September 2022 from Les Sables-d'Olonne in France. Like in 2018, the solo-sailors gathered for the SITraN Prologue, starting 14 August 2022, before sailing to Les Sables-d'Olonne for the GGR Race Village.
