= 2026 Golden Globe Race =

2026 solo-around-the-world sailing race

The 2026 Golden Globe race set off from Les Sables-D'Olonne on the 6th September 2026 with 16 skippers. Each sailor was given a final handshake by Sir Robin Knox-Johnston.
