= 2022 Golden Globe Race =

2022 solo round-the-world sailing race

Event title
- Edition: 3rd

Event details
- Venue: Les Sables-d'Olonne
- Dates: 4 September 2022
- Yachts: 'Retro' fibreglass 32-36ft
- Key people: Don McIntyre (race chairman)

Competitors
- Competitors: 16

Results
- (gold) Gold: Kirsten Neuschäfer
- (silver) Silver: Abhilash Tomy
- (bronze) Bronze: Michael Guggenberger

The 2022 Golden Globe Race was the third edition of the original Sunday Times Golden Globe Race. The race, a solo around-the-world sailing race, started on 4 September 2022 from Les Sables-d'Olonne in France. Similar to the 2018 event, the solo-sailors gathered for the SITraN Prologue in Gijón (Spain) on 14 August 2022, before sailing to Les Sables-d'Olonne for the GGR Race Village, which opened on 21 August 2022. The race was won by South African Kirsten Neuschäfer, who returned to Les Sables-d'Olonne on 27 April 2023, after an official time of 233 days, 20 hours, 43 minutes and 47 seconds at sea, approximately one day ahead of her closest rival.

The race set a number of records: Neuschäfer was the first woman to win any round-the-world race via the three great capes, including solo and fully crewed races, whether non-stop or with stops. She was the first South African sailor (male or female) to win a round-the-world event. She was also the first woman to complete the GGR in the race's history, the first woman to win the GGR, and the only woman skipper who participated in the 2022 GGR.

== Retro sailing ==
As with the 2018 Golden Globe Race, entrants were limited to sailing similar yachts and equipment to what was available to Sir Robin Knox-Johnston, the winner of the original race in 1968–69. That means sailing without the use of modern technology such as satellite-based navigation aids. Safety equipment such as EPIRBs and AIS were carried, however the competitors were only allowed to use the technology in an emergency.

Competitors could apply to have their class of boat approved, providing it complied with the following rules:

- Constructed of fibre reinforced plastic.
- Designed prior to 1988, with a minimum series of 20 yachts built from one mould.
- Has a hull length of between 32 and 36 feet (9.8 and 11.0 m). Bowsprits, wind vanes and outboard rudders, boomkins, pushpits and pulpits are not measured.
- Has a full-length keel with rudders attached to the trailing edge.
- A minimum design displacement of 6,200 kilograms (13,700 lb)

== Route ==
The race started on 4 September 2022 in Les Sables-d'Olonne and leads around the world eastward, leaving Cape of Good Hope, Cape Leeuwin and Cape Horn to port. There were four "film gates" along the route - Lanzarote, Cape Town, Hobart and Punta del Este - where the skippers could be interviewed as they sail past without stopping and where they passed over films and letters.

== Entrants ==
The following 16 skippers started the race:

	Sailor	Yacht	Type
1	(France) Arnaud Gaist	Feï of Shanghaï	Barbican 33 MKII (Long Keel Version)
2	(France) Damien Guillou	PRB	Rustler 36
3	(India) Abhilash Tomy	Bayanat	Rustler 36
4	(Canada) Edward Walentynowicz	Noah's Jest	Rustler 36
5	(United States) Elliott Smith	Second Wind	GaleForce 34
6	(United Kingdom) Ertan Beskardes	Lazy Otter	Rustler 36
7	(United States) Guy deBoer	Spirit	Tashiba 36
8	(United Kingdom) Guy Waites	Sagarmatha	Tradewind 35
9	(United Kingdom) Ian Herbert-Jones	Puffin	Tradewind 35
10	(South Africa) Jeremy Bagshaw	Olleanna	OE32
11	(South Africa) Kirsten Neuschäfer	Minnehaha	Cape George Cutter, CG36
12	(Australia) Mark Sinclair	Coconut	Lello 34
13	(Austria) Michael Guggenberger	Nuri	Biscay 36
14	(Republic of Ireland) Pat Lawless	Green Rebel	Saltram Saga 36
15	(United Kingdom) Simon Curwen	Clara	Biscay 36
16	(Finland) Tapio Lehtinen	Asteria	Gaia 36

== The race ==
The race started on 4 September 2022, with the competitors passing a rolling gate between the yachts Galiana and L’Esprit d’Equipe. The official starter was Sir Robin Knox-Johnston, the winner of the original Golden Globe Race. The race concluded on 15 June 2023 with the last competitor, Jeremy Bagshaw, arriving back at Les Sables d’Olonne.

Competitor	Cape Town gate	Storm Bay Tasmania gate	Cape Horn	Finish
(South Africa) Kirsten Neuschäfer	8 November	25 December	15 February	27 April
(India) Abhilash Tomy	10 November	27 December	18 February	28 April
(Austria) Michael Guggenberger	12 November	3 January	26 February	12 May
Chichester class (one stop)
(United Kingdom) Simon Curwen (Note: Stop in Puerto Low, Chile to repair windvane.)	6 November	24 December	25 February	27 April
(South Africa) Jeremy Bagshaw (Note: Stop in Hobart to remove barnacles and load more water.)	17 November	16 January	14 March	15 June
Retired (in order of retirement)
Competitor	Date	Details		
(Canada) Edward Walentynowicz	9 September 2022	Retired "due to personal reasons".		
(United States) Guy de Boer	18 September 2022	Hit a rock north off Fuertaventura.		
(Australia) Mark Sinclair	23 September 2022	Retired near Lanzarote, citing "family reasons".		
(Republic of Ireland) Pat Lawless	9 November 2022	Retired, after reaching Cape Town gate, due to failure of self-steering system		
(France) Damien Guillou	14 November 2022	Retired, after reaching Cape Town gate, also due to failure of self-steering system		
(United Kingdom) Ertan Beskardes	16 November 2022	Retired in Cape Town, explaining "I was looking for the unknown, and I found it,"		
(Finland) Tapio Lehtinen	18 November 2022	Boat sank in the Southern Indian Ocean, sailor was rescued by Kirsten Neuschäfer.		
(France) Arnaud Gaist	2 December 2022	Retired due to barnacles and rigging issues.		
(United States) Elliott Smith	19 January 2023	Retired in Australia after breaking the bowsprit.		
(United Kingdom) Guy Waites	10 February 2023	Retired in Hobart after losing the life raft during a knock-down (in Chichester class since Cape Town).		
(United Kingdom) Ian Herbert-Jones	11 April 2023	Rolled and dismasted in the Southern Atlantic (in Chichester class since Cape Horn).		
