= Noss =

Noss may refer to:

== Places ==
- Isle of Noss, a small, previously inhabited island in Shetland, Scotland
- Noss, Caithness, near Wick, Highland, Scotland
  - Noss Head Lighthouse, located nearby
- Noss, Dartmouth, the name given to an Iron Age hill fort situated close to Dartmouth in Devon, England
- Noss, Mainland Shetland, a location in Scotland
- Noss Mayo, village in south-west Devon, England, about 6 miles south-east of Plymouth

== People with the surname ==
- Arthur Noss (1897–1917), British World War I flying ace credited with nine aerial victories
- Milton Ernest "Doc" Noss (1905–1949), American businessman and gold prospector who reported found the Victorio Peak treasure
- Reed Noss (born 1952), conservation biologist at the University of Central Florida

== Other ==
- Naval Ocean Surveillance System
- Noss, fictional alien, see Gravity (Star Trek: Voyager)
- Ah W Noss (Arabic: آه ونص), 2004 album from Lebanese singer Nancy Ajram

== See also ==
- NOS (disambiguation)
