= Royal Bombay Yacht Club =

Boating association in India

Coordinates: 18°55′24″N 72°50′00″E

- Club badge

- The club burgee features the Imperial Crown and the Star of India
- Founded: 1846; 180 years ago
- Location: Mumbai, India
- Website: rbyc.co.in

The Royal Bombay Yacht Club (RBYC) is one of the premier gentlemen's clubs which was founded in 1846 in Colaba (formerly Wellington Pier), an area of Mumbai in India. The building was designed by John Adams, who also designed the nearby Royal Alfred Sailors' Homes (now the Maharashtra Police Headquarters), and was completed in 1896.

The club offers chambers for residence overlooking the Gateway of India, a bar, a lounge, a restaurant, ballrooms, a club shop, a men's salon, a library, a gymnasium with steam and sauna facilities, a cue sports room and members cards room, in addition to sailing facilities in the Arabian Sea.

The club regularly conducts sailing events and championships for members and yachtsmen across the Mumbai region. Admission to the club is reserved by exclusive membership.

== History ==
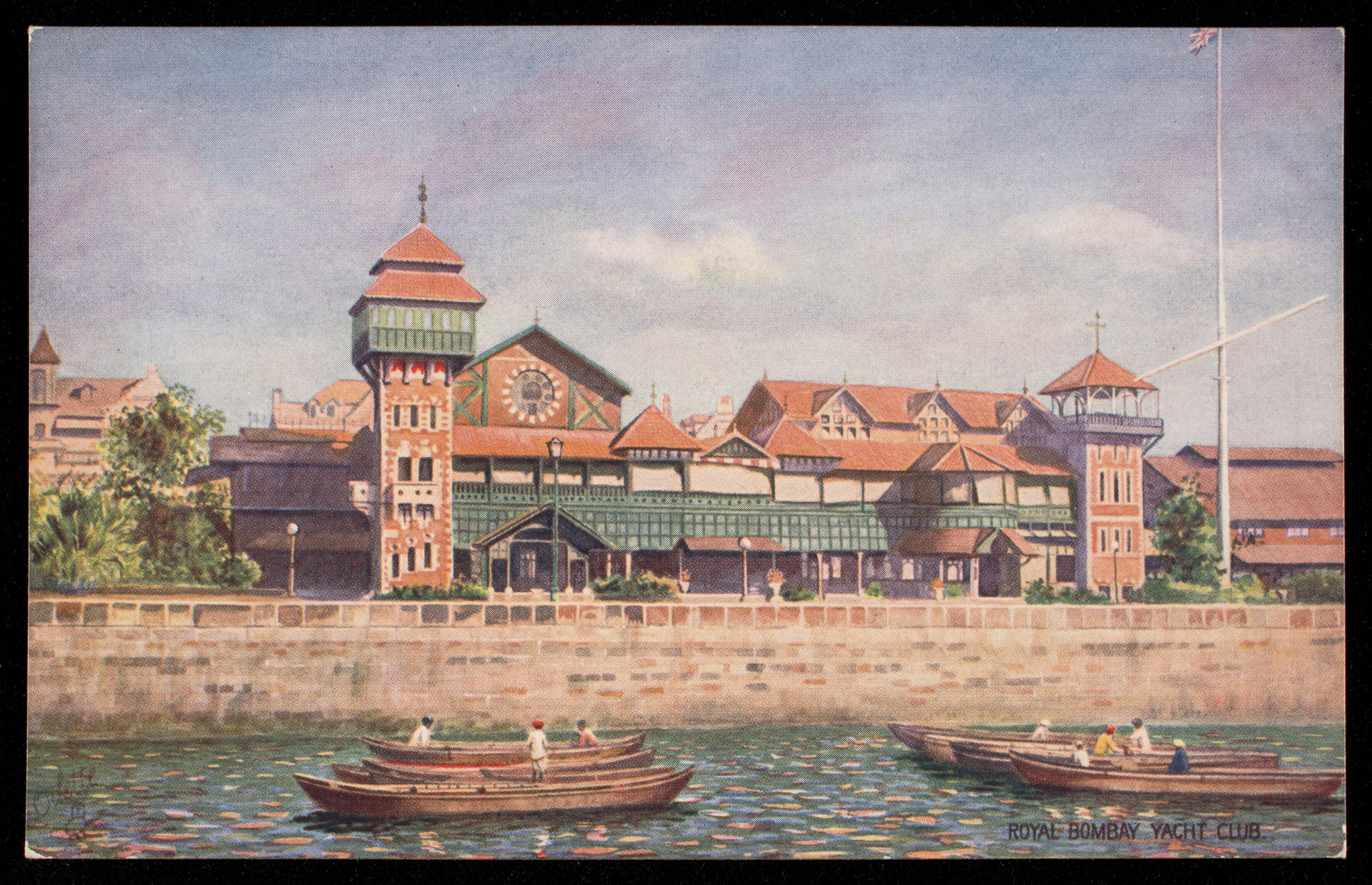
Royal Bombay Yacht Club postcard, 1903, with the eastern 1881 building.

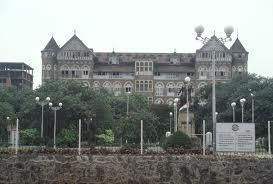
Western 1896 club premises in Mumbai, as seen from the Gateway of India, 2018.

The Bombay Yacht Club was founded in 1846 with Henry Morland as club commodore. In 1876, on the recommendation of Sir Philip Wodehouse, Queen Victoria permitted it to add the word Royal to its name.

The seafront clubhouse, later called the Old Yacht Club (OYC), was built in 1881 and received a number of prominent visitors within its first ten years, including Prince Arthur, Duke of Connaught and Strathearn, and his wife, Princess Louise Margaret of Prussia, and the railroad tycoon and yachting enthusiast William Kissam Vanderbilt – part owner of the 1895 America's Cup winner, the 37.5-m sloop Defender.

In 1894, the Commissioners of the Lord High Admiral of the United Kingdom bestowed upon the club a Blue Ensign with a Star of India surmounted by the Imperial Crown.

Another clubhouse was built in 1896 (to the west, just across Chhatrapati Shivaji Maharaj Road), a blending of Venetian Gothic architecture with Indian Saracenic, to provide accommodations for members and visiting associates.

Yachting received a major stimulus in 1911, when King George V and Queen Mary sailed to Bombay abroad the RMS Medina on her maiden voyage.

Access to the club was restricted to Europeans only until the 1950s. Lord Willingdon was appointed Governor of Bombay in 1913 with a mandate from King George V to 'to smash through all fences which socially divide communities'. When Willingdon attempted to take Indian friends to the yacht club and they were refused entry, the outraged Willingdon resigned his membership and in 1917 founded the Willingdon Sports Club which would have no colour bar. In 1958, a Europeans only club called the Bombay Club closed and its members were granted honorary memberships by the yacht club which provided a new home for their furniture and other effects. Kerse Naoroji was the first Indian to be invited to join the club but refused membership for several years, finally accepting the invitation in 1959.

The 1960s saw a new race introduced after the late Prince Philip, Duke of Edinburgh, visited the club and presented the Challenge Cup for a Combined Class race not less than 21 miles. The RBYC at that time owned a fleet of four 21-foot Seabird Half Raters, whilst its members’ owned boats including the Chindwin (Bermudian cutter), the Iona (a Gunter sloop), the Silver Oak (a Yachting World keel boat), the Tir (a yawl), the Merope (Stor-Draken class) and the Griffon and the Wynvern (two International Dragons). The club was selected to host the 6th National Regatta for the Yachting Association of India.

Member Philip Bragg, who built the Suhaili, the first yacht to sail solo non-stop around the world, died in 1984. Yachtsman Sir Robin Knox-Johnson attended a reception in his honour at the club in 2004.

In 2013 the Royal Bombay Yacht Club Residential Chambers received an award of merit in the 2013 UNESCO Asia-Pacific Heritage Awards.

== See also ==
- List of India's gentlemen's clubs
- Royal Madras Yacht Club
