= Deutsche Internationale Schule Pretoria =

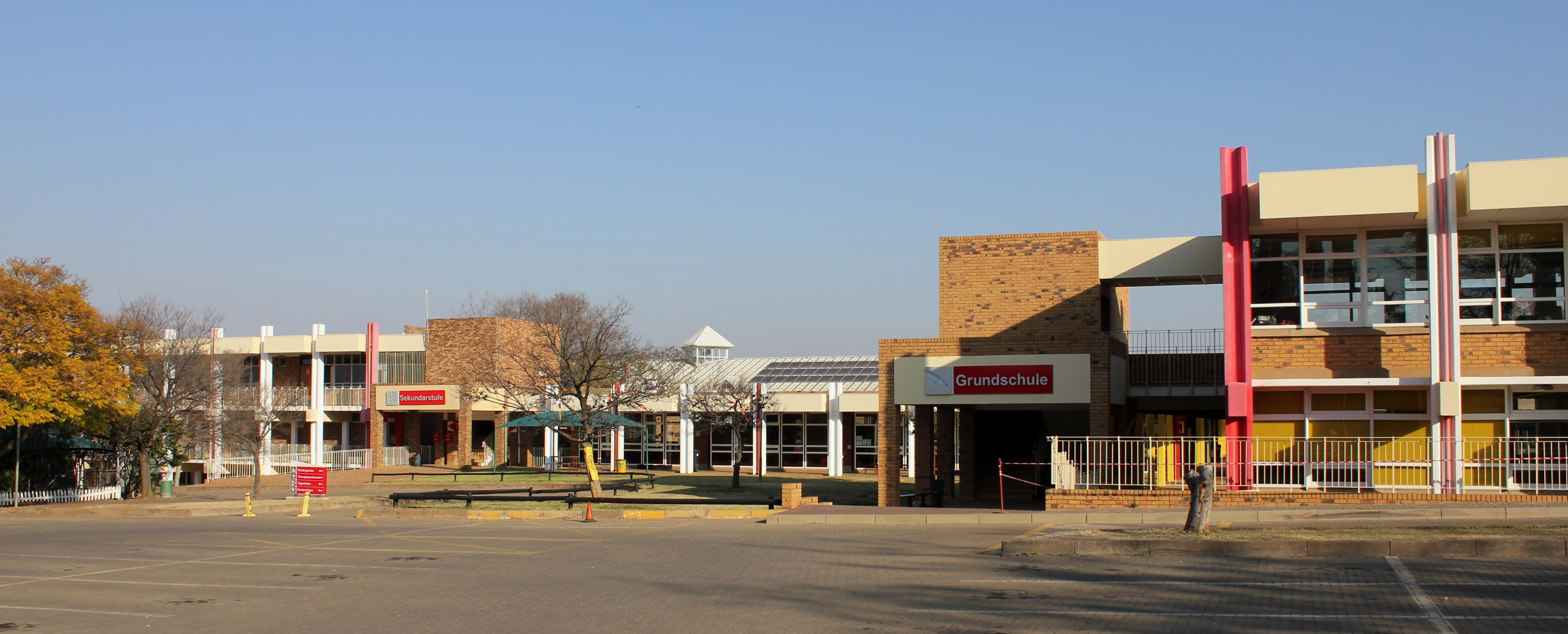

Location
- Simon Vermooten Road; Die Wilgers; Pretoria 0041; South Africa
- Coordinates: 25°44′58″S 28°19′44″E

Information
- Type: German International School
- Opened: December 1899
- Principal: Manuel Haß
- Grades: Crèche through Grade 12
- Website: dspretoria.co.za

The German International School Pretoria (DSP) is a German- and English-medium school located in The Willows, Pretoria, South Africa.

== History ==
The DSP was founded in December 1899, with the first school building officially opened in 1900.

1924 saw the school move to bigger premises in the Pretoria city centre.

In 1965, the DSP had 16 teachers and 399 learners from pre-school to Grade 7.

Until 1967, the DSP was a primary school only. In 1968 a Grade 8 class was started, followed by a Grade 9 class in 1969 and so on, until the DSP sat its first Matric class for school-leaving exams in 1972.

With the school growing too small for its Pretoria city centre facilities, DSP's current property was purchased in 1969. Construction of the new school began in 1975 and the DSP moved officially in 1977.

In 1985 the DSP Kindergarten was opened, while in 2013 the school opened a crèche, for children from 3 months of age.

In 1988 the DSP launched an outreach "Education Builds Bridges," aimed at previously disadvantaged learners from Mamelodi and Eersterust. Since then, over 800 children have taken part in the programme, which is made possible by a grant from the Federal Republic of Germany. At a ceremony for the 30th anniversary of the programme on 8 November 2019, former South African President Kgalema Motlanthe thanked the DSP for playing a role in the creation of a new South Africa 30 years ago. "The decision of the German School was courageous and gave additional impetus to the process of democratisation of South Africa", said Motlanthe.

As of 2021, the DSP has roughly 50 teachers and 750 learners, from its Crèche through to Grade 12.

At the beginning of 2022, Manuel Haß from Aalen in Germany joined the DSP as Principal.

== Operations ==
The school is funded through school fees, donations, fundraising and support from the German government.

It is founded on the German Education model of teaching, which emphasizes developing independence in children, encourages critical thinking, supports children taking ownership for their learning process, and stresses the development of creative problem-solving skills.

Since 1999, the school has added a new Media/Computer Centre, an Arts, Crafts and Design Centre, dedicated music facility, as well as a LEGO Robotics Lab.

== Curriculum and graduation options ==
The DSP follows German and South African curricula, with German and English taught as both mother tongue and as a foreign language.

The school is divided into the following phases:

Early Learning (including a Crèche and Kindergarten), Primary (Pre-school to Grade 4), Secondary I (Grades 5–9) and Secondary II (Grades 10–12), all of which work closely with each other.

In the Secondary School I phase, learners in German classes can complete a school-leaving certificate equivalent to the German "Hauptschulabschluss" (Grade 9) or "Realschulabschluss" (Grade 10).

At the end of Grade 9, in preparation for entry to Secondary School II, learners decide whether they want to follow the German Kombi-Abitur or the South African National Senior Certificate (NSC) Programme. In the NSC, learners are prepared in the English medium for the NSC examination at the end of Grade 12, as set by the Independent Examination Board (IEB). This can then be supplemented by the German Language Diploma (DSD II), which qualifies a learner to study in Germany.

The language of tuition in the Kombi-Abitur is mainly German and affords learners the opportunity to earn a dual school-leaving certificate (the German international "Abitur" and the NSC).

== Oktoberfest ==
Pretoria's annual Oktoberfest was first held at the DSP in the Willows in 1977, as a fundraiser for the school. Despite its name, it is held in September, like the "original" Oktoberfest in Munich, Germany, which runs from the second half of September until the first Sunday in October. Attractions include an authentic Oompah band, German food like Eisbein, Bratwurst, Schnitzel, Brezel and Lebkuchen, as well as both German and local beers. For the first time in its history, the Oktoberfest was cancelled in both 2020 and 2021 because of the COVID-19 pandemic.

== Notable alumni ==
- Kirsten Neuschäfer, sailor specializing in high latitude and high adventure sailing, winner of the 2022 Golden Globe Race.

== Gallery ==
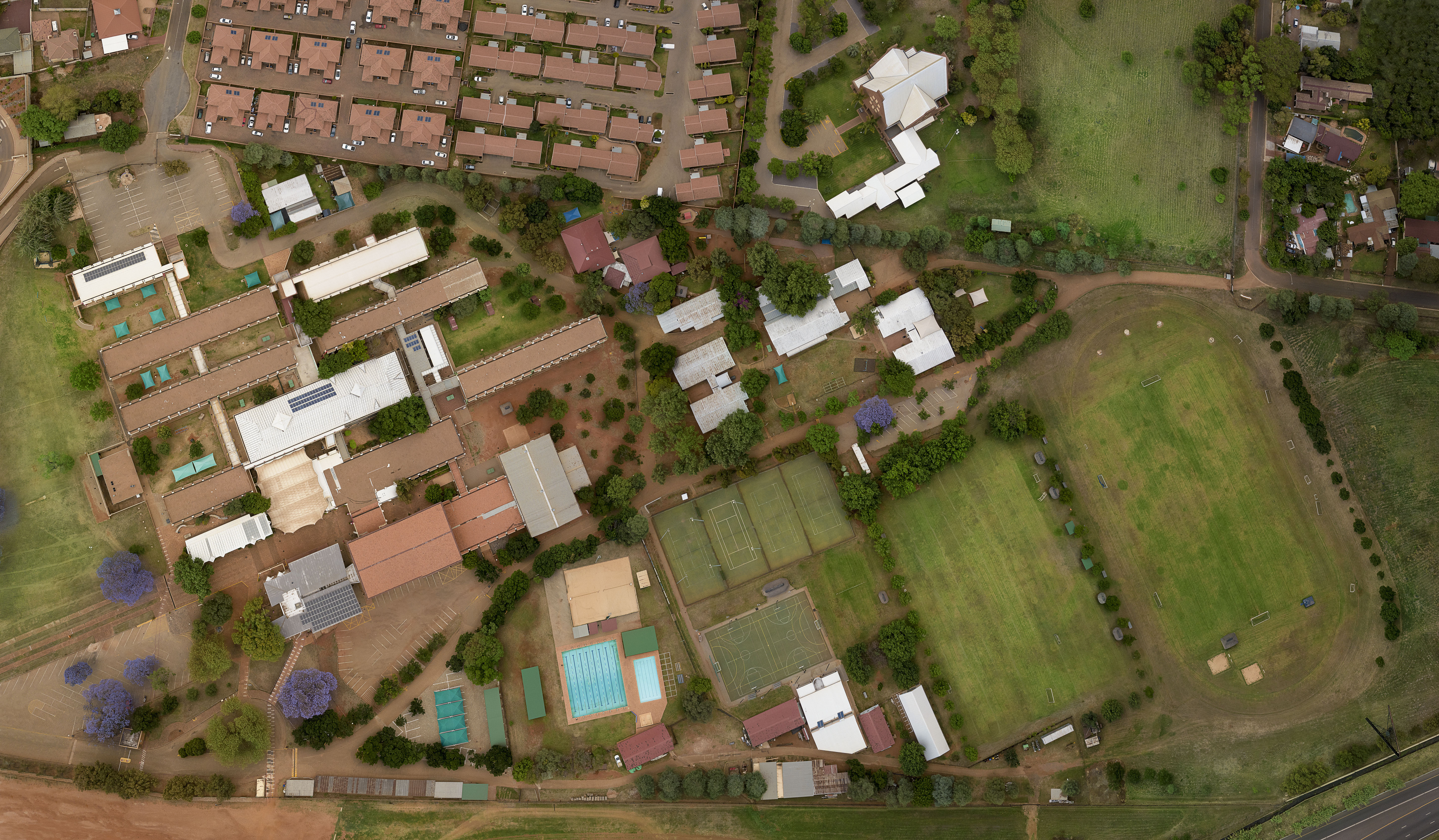
Aerial view of the DSP

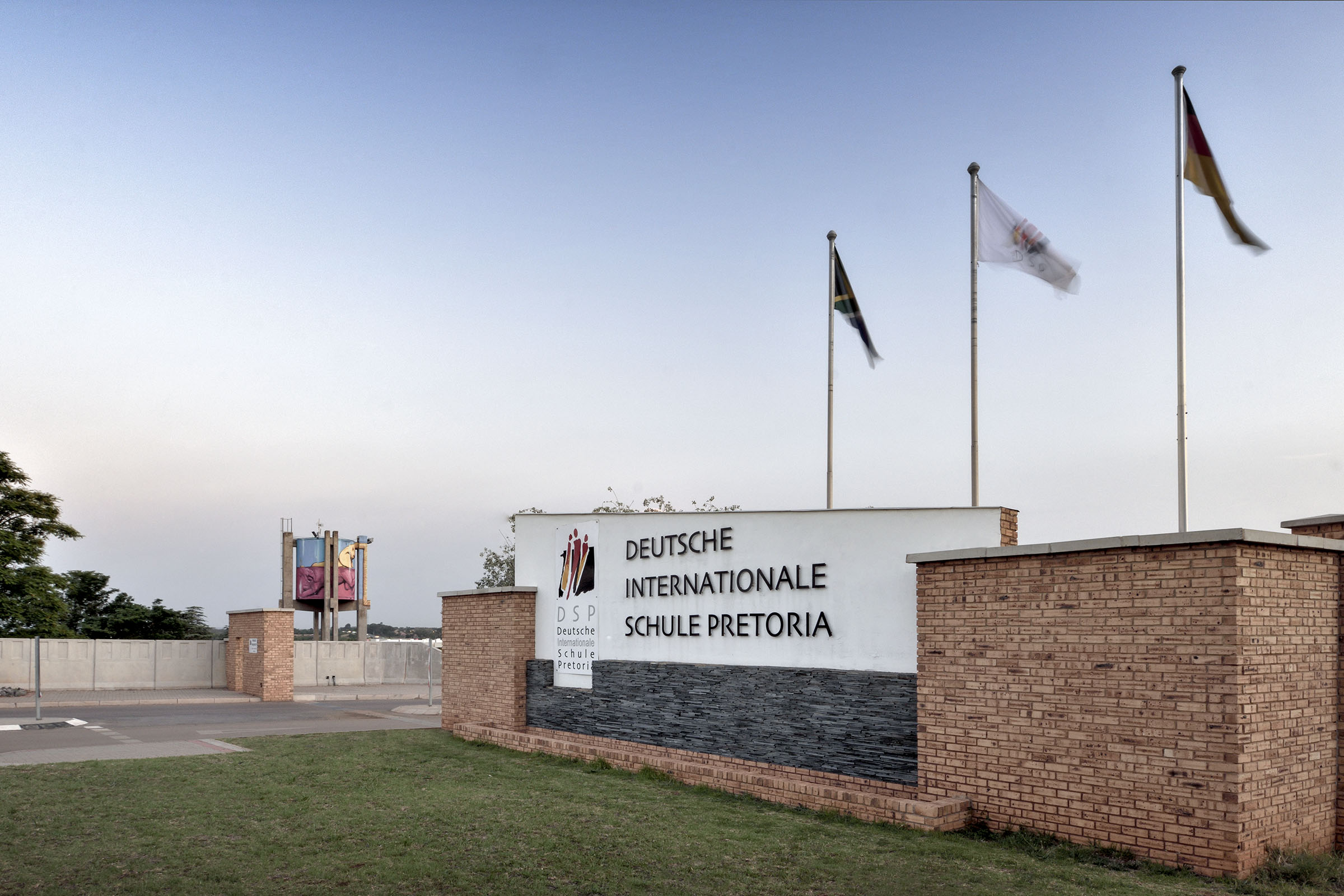
DSP Main Entrance

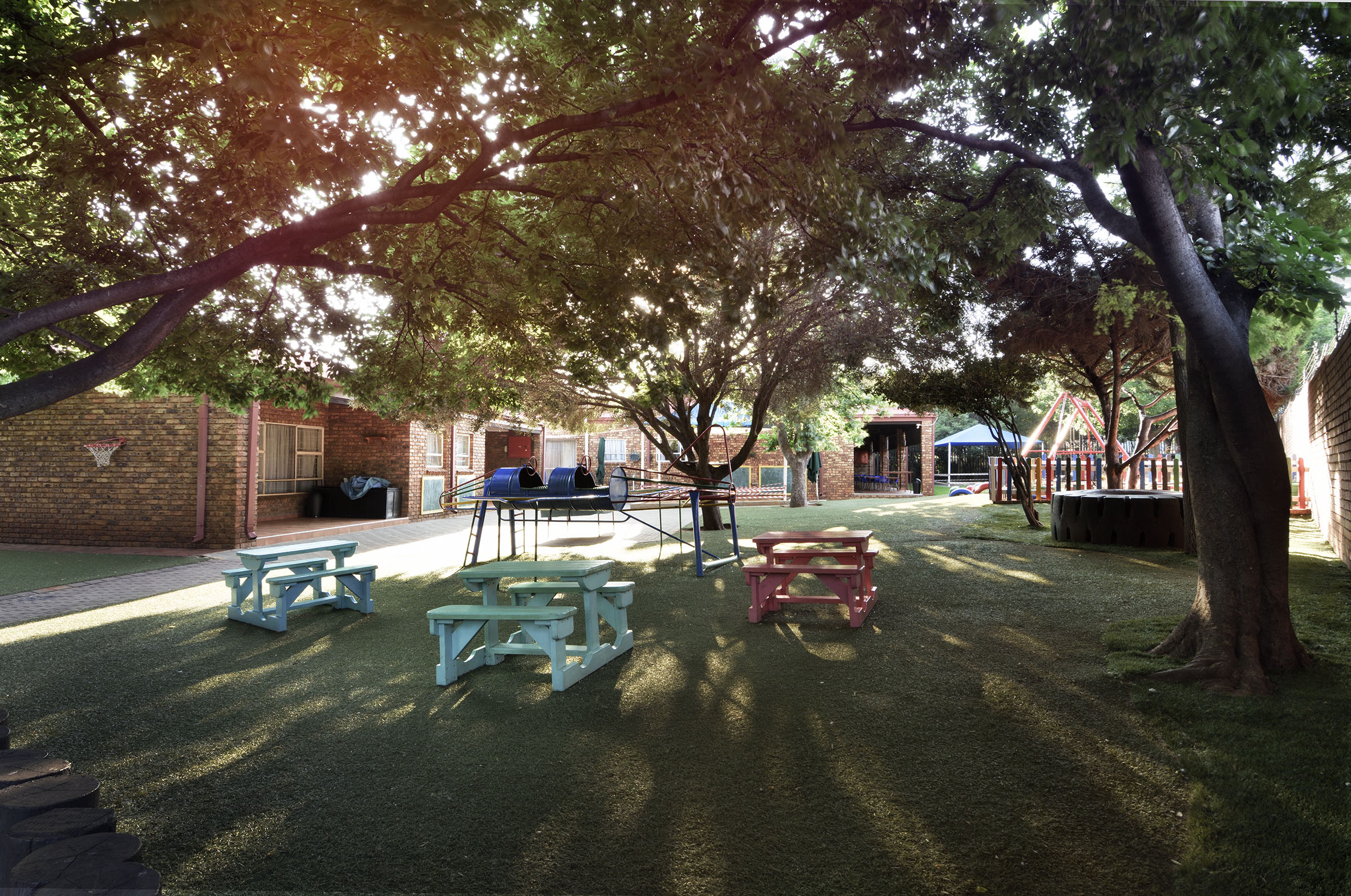
DSP Kindergarten

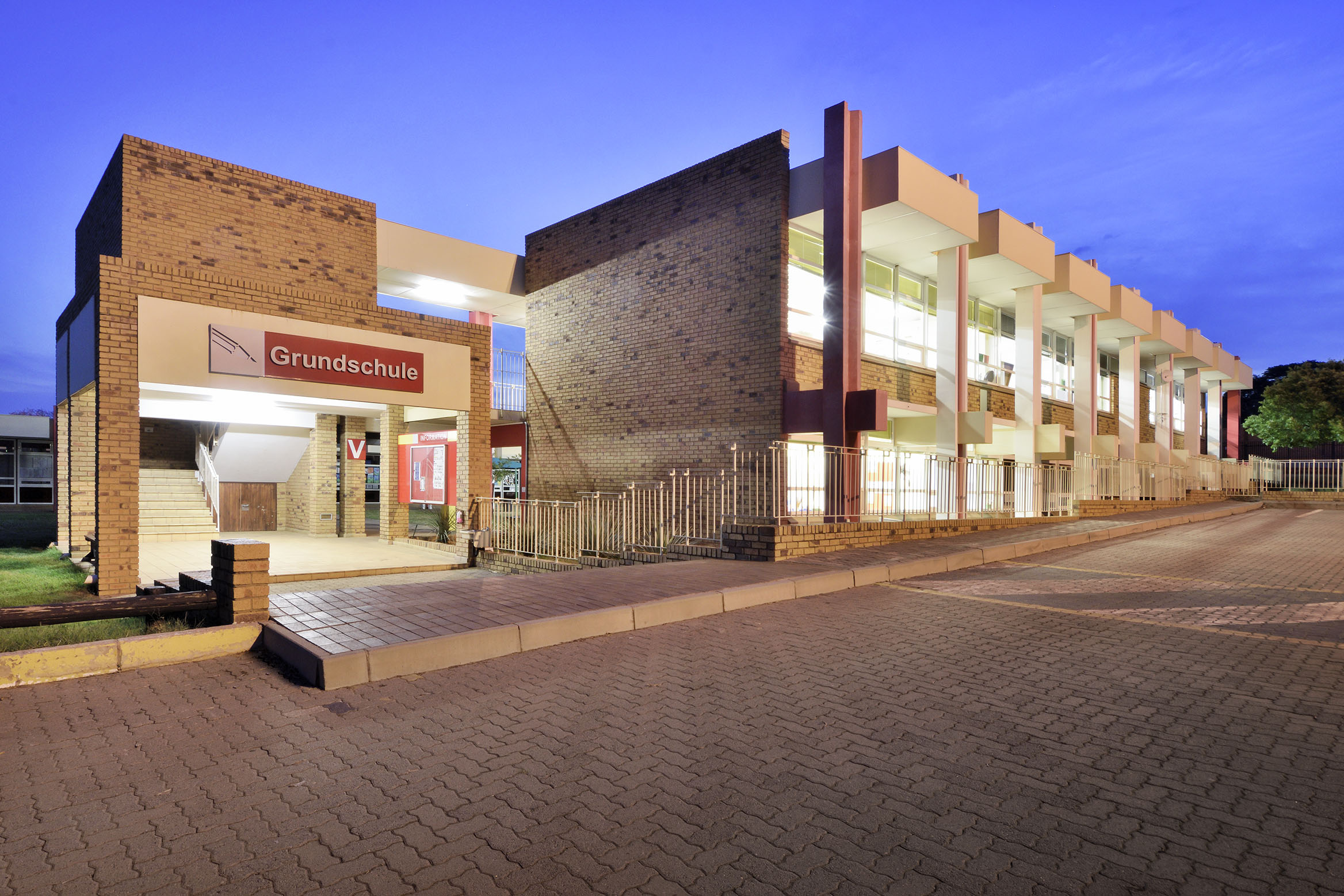
DSP Primary School

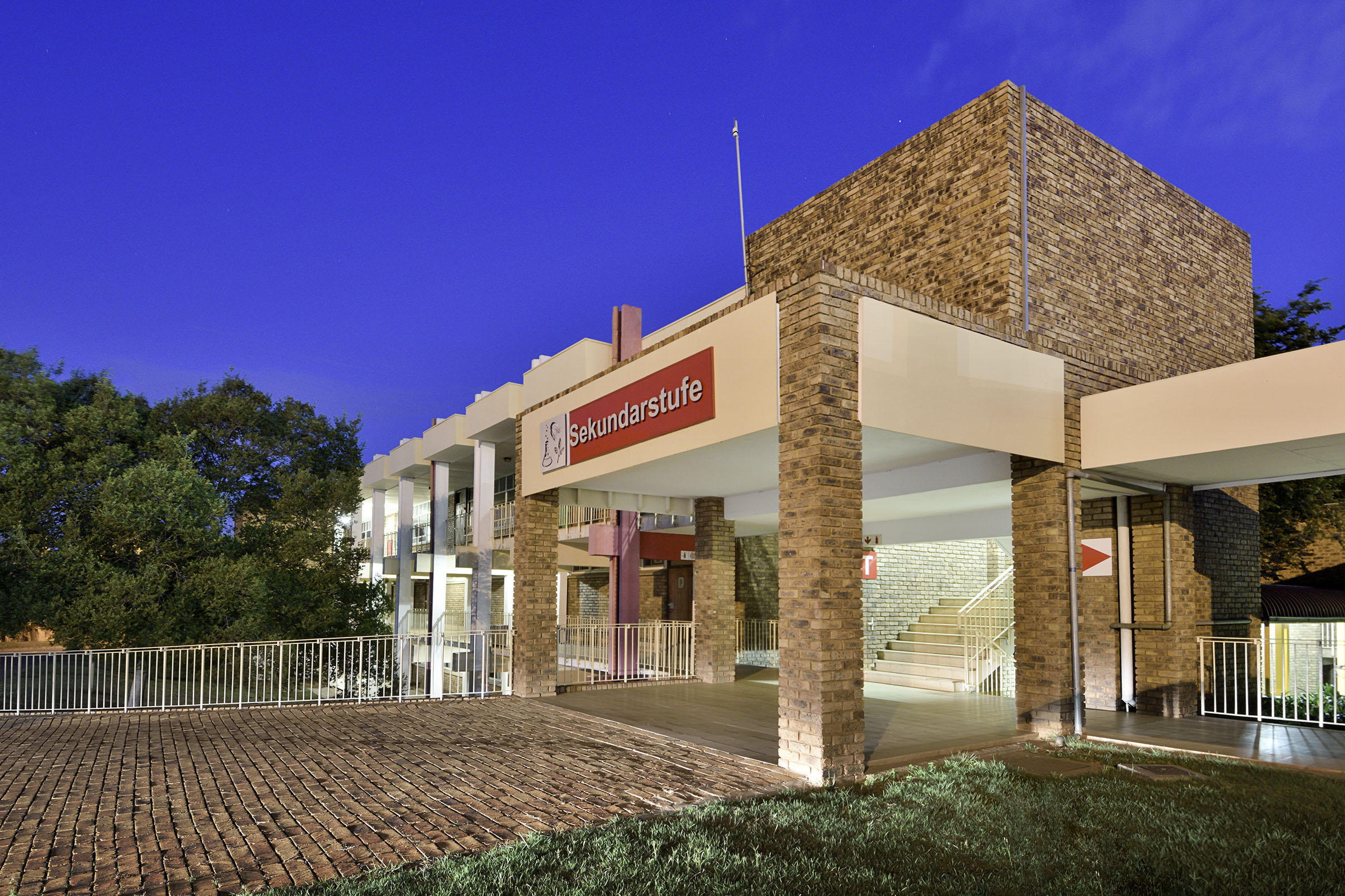
DSP High School

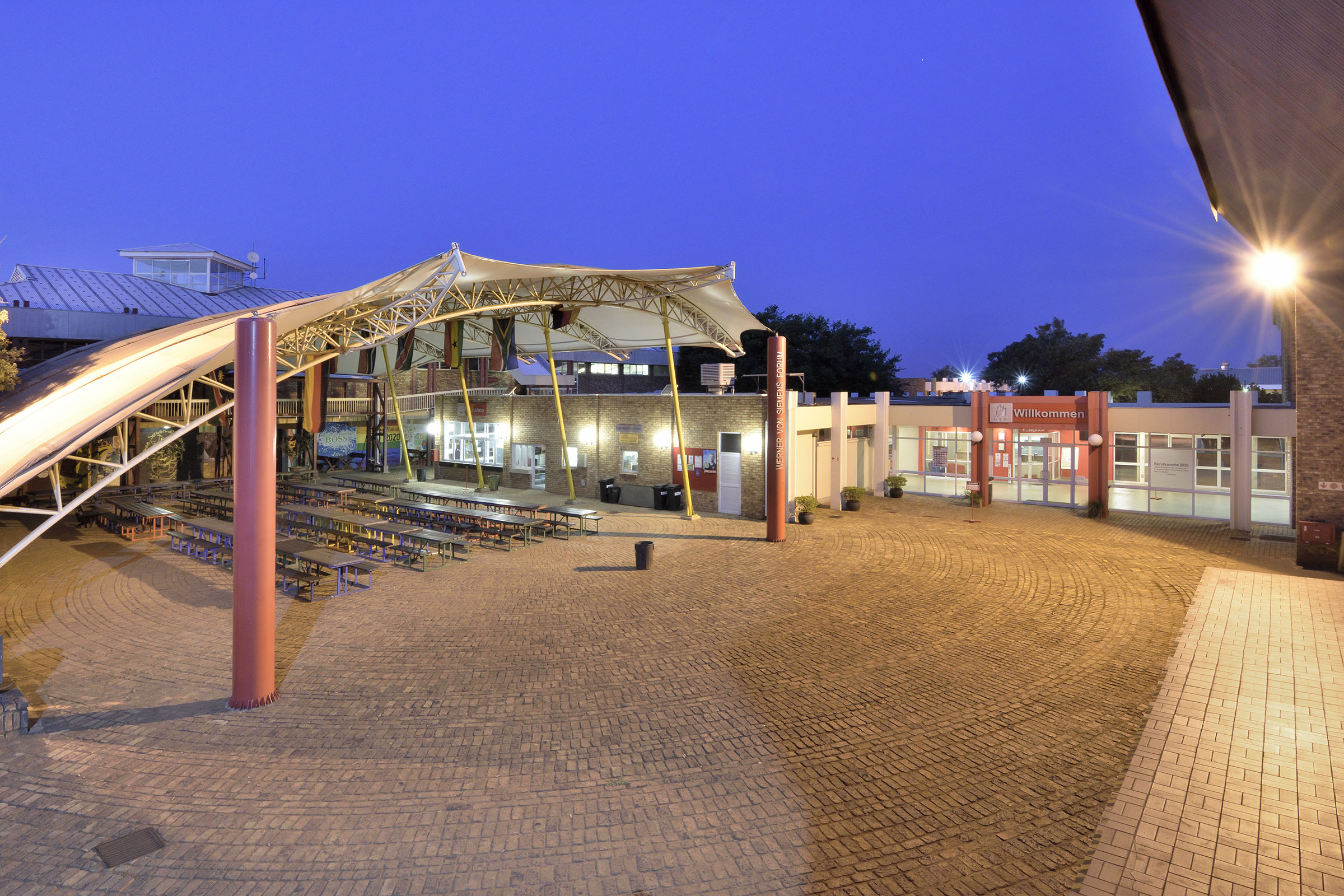
DSP Siemens Forum
