= British Steel =

British Steel may refer to:

Companies

- British Steel (1967–1999), formed in 1967 as British Steel Corporation (BSC) through the nationalisation of UK steel companies and privatised in 1988 as British Steel plc
- British Steel (2016–present), formed 2016 from the sale of the long products division of Tata Steel Europe (former British Steel plc business) to Greybull Capital.

Other

- British Steel (album), 1980 album by heavy metal band Judas Priest
- British Steel (yacht), 59 ft ketch used for a circumnavigation of the globe by Chay Blyth in 1970-71

== See also ==
- Iron and Steel Corporation of Great Britain
