= NOS =

NOS may refer to:

== Science and technology ==
- Nitrous oxide, also known as nos
- Nitric oxide synthase, a class of enzymes
- Nitrous oxide system, an internal combustion engine
- Not Otherwise Specified, a categorization of illnesses
- Network operating system, a type of software
- NOS (operating system), a CDC network operating system
- KA9Q NOS, a TCP/IP implementation
- NOS stereo technique, for audio recording

== Businesses and organizations ==
- National Ocean Service, US
- National Office of Statistics, Algeria
- National Orthodox School, Amman, Jordan
- Nederlandse Omroep Stichting, a Dutch public broadcasting corporation
- New Orleans Saints, an American football team
- Nitrous Oxide Systems, a subdivision of Holley Performance Products, an American automotive company
- NOS (Portuguese company)
- NOS, the ICAO designator of the now-defunct Norwegian airline, Norway Airlines
- NOS, the ICAO designator of the Italian airline Neos

== Music ==
- Nos, an opera by Shostakovich
- N.O.S, part of the French rap duo PNL

== Other uses ==
- Nation of Sanctuary, Welsh Government initiative
- National Occupational Standards, UK
- National Orange Show, San Bernardino, California, US
- New old stock, unused old merchandise
- NOS (drink), an energy drink from Monster Beverage Corporation, named after Nitrous Oxide Systems
- Nos: Book of the Resurrection, a book by Miguel Serrano
- Nos. or nos., the numero sign, an abbreviation of "numbers"
- Fascene Airport, Nosy Be, Madagascar (IATA code)

== See also ==
- Nós
- Noss (disambiguation)
