= Tapio Lehtinen =

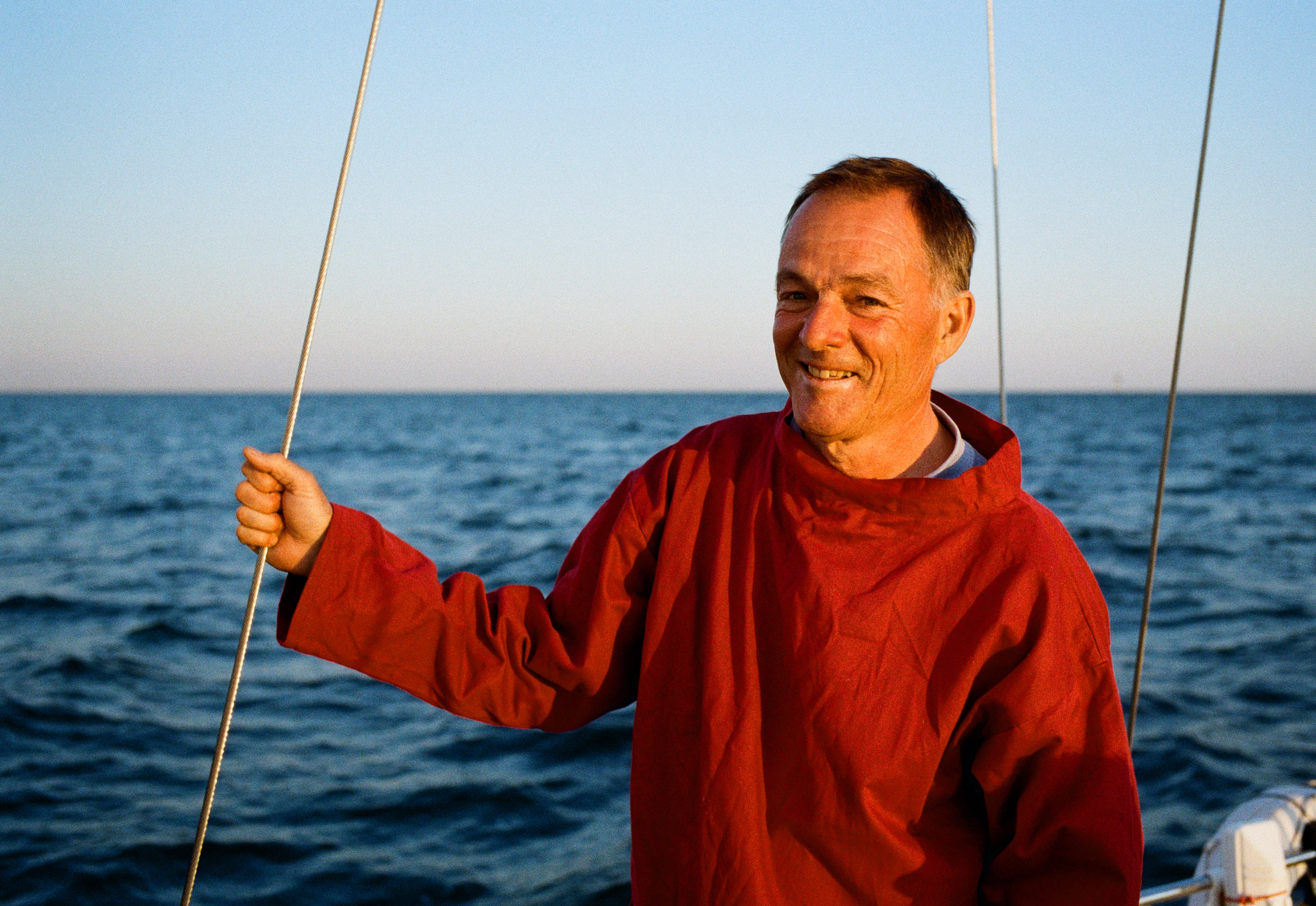
Tapio Lehtinen on his yacht Galiana in the summer 2020.

Tapio Lehtinen (born 19 January 1958) is a Finnish Industrial engineer, a former commodore of the Helsingfors Segelsällskap and one of the most prominent Finnish single-handed sailors. He participated in the 2018 Golden Globe Race and sailed solo, without stops, around the world. He was placed fifth in the race.

== Sailing career ==
Lehtinen began sailing in 1965 with optimists, and during his junior years he raced actively with light sailing craft. Lehtinen has also sailed with Laser, 470 and 29er dinghies. Later he has been an active sailor in the open seas and oceans, and in 1981–82 he participated in the Whitbread Round the World Race in the boat Skopbank of Finland, serving as its officer in charge of navigational watch. The boat was placed 12th in the race.

After the race, Lehtinen was invited to become a member of the Helsingfors Segelsällskap. After that he has had a racing career of more than 30 years with his 6mR boat named May Be IV.

He has participated in the Round Britain and Ireland Yacht Race, Single-Handed Trans-Atlantic Race, Azores and Back as well as the Newport Bermuda Race.

Lehtinen has served in the board of the Finnish Opthimist Dinghy Association and thrice in the board of the Finnish 6mR Association. He sought the position of the commodore of the HSS in order to further its youth activities and to improve its financial position.

=== Golden Globe Race 2018 ===
Lehtinen was one of the 18 sailors to participate in the 2018 Golden Globe Race. He was one of the five sailors who were able to complete the race, and was placed last. The race was the 50th anniversary race of the original Golden Globe Race, and participators were allowed to use only techniques available during the original race.

The race began on 1 July 2018, from Les Sables-d'Olonne, France. Lehtinen's boat was called Asteria. It was built in Italy in 1964, and its type was S&S Gaia 36.

By the time Lehtinen reached the waters of Tasmania, his boat was plagued by lepadidae, which had fastened on its bottom in the Indian Ocean. The Australian authorities did not allow him to clear the bottom of the boat, as lepadidae is an introduced species in the region. Some of the other participants in the race, however, had been allowed to undertake such an operation. The lepadidae had been able to fasten on the bottom of the boat, as it had not been treated with appropriate anti-fouling paint. The mistake had been made at a Finnish yard, and the reason for this was that the kinds of anti-fouling paint that are used for boats in ocean races are not allowed to be used in the Baltic Sea. The lepadidae effectively put an end to Lehtinen's competition for victory, and he was not able to achieve more than the bottom place in the race.

Lehtinen arrived at the finish in Les Sables-d'Olonne on 19 May 2019. He had travelled more than 30 000 nautical miles or ca. 55 000 kilometers. He was the only contestant to arrive at the finish without experiencing a knockdown, that is, without his mast and sails hitting the surface of the ocean. According to Lehtinen, the design of the boat prevented this in winds that could have been between 45–60 knots of speed.

The boats participating in the race also had an engine, just as in the 1968 race. The participants were allowed to have 150 litres of fuel on board. It was meant to be used in situations in which the ocean was calm and there was no wind. Lehtinen's engine went out of order early during the race near the Canary Islands, and he was not able to repair it. At the finish, he still had 135 litres of fuel left. The other participants who reached the finish had nothing left.

Lehtinen used 322 days for his voyage. Jean-Luc van den Heede, 73 years old, used 211 days for his voyage and reached the finish on 29 January.

It has been said of Lehtinen's race, that his position at the finish is “one of the best fifth positions of Finnish sailing ever.” It has also been said that the solo sailing around the world of Hjallis Harkimo of 1986–87 pales next to Lehtinen's race, as Harkimo was allowed to stop at various points during his race and stock up with fresh food and water. Lehtinen, however, stocked up with all he needed at the start, and at the end of the race he still had food for two more months and water for two more weeks.

=== Other races ===
In 2019, Lehtinen announced that he would be participating in the 2022 Golden Globe Race, in order to give his boat a new chance in the race. In the 2022 race, he made it to the southern Indian Ocean and was in second place at that point, but his boat sank; after 24 hours in a life raft, he was rescued by fellow competitor Kirsten Neuschäfer, who ultimately won the race. After that he plans to captain an all-Finnish team in the 2023 Ocean Globe race, with a boat he is to buy from England, the down payment for which he has already paid.

== Personal life ==
Tapio Lehtinen has two children. Olympic sailor Lauri Lehtinen and Olympic medalist Silja Lehtinen.
