= British Steel (yacht) =

British Steel is a 59 ft (18 m) ketch famous for a circumnavigation of the globe "the wrong way" (i.e. from east to west, against prevailing winds and currents) by Chay Blyth in 1970/71.

The entire race was completed in 292 days. Described by The Times as "The most outstanding passage ever made by one man alone", under the headline "Boat of Steel - Man of Iron", the feat inspired two generations of ocean voyagers and adventurers, forming the basis of the 1992 British Steel Challenge and the subsequent BT Global Challenges.

British Steel is currently moored in Dartmouth, Devon and undergoing restoration.

== History ==
British Steel was designed by Devon-based naval architect Robert Clark, and built in 1970 by Philip and Son, at Noss, on the River Dart. Launched on 19 August of that year, after a record build time of four months, British Steel was described by Don Holme in his book The Circumnavigators as representing the absolute pinnacle of modern yacht design and construction at the time, particularly with regard to the use of steel in the building of her hull.

It was primarily for this reason, when approached by the erstwhile adventurer and "publicity-yachtist" Chay Blyth, then state-owned British Steel Corporation (later Corus) agreed to sponsor his plan.

Purpose-built to achieve what was widely regarded as impossible, the design and construction of British Steel cost £20,000. Boasting state-of-the-art electronics, she also featured a host of other innovative features to complete her voyage single-handed.
