= John Ridgway (sailor) =

British yachtsman and rower (born 1938)

John Manfield Ridgway MBE (born 8 July 1938) is a British yachtsman and rower.

== Biography ==
Ridgway was educated at the Pangbourne Nautical College and the Royal Military Academy Sandhurst. In 1966, whilst a Captain in the Parachute Regiment, Ridgway, together with Chay Blyth, rowed across the North Atlantic in a 20 ft open dory called English Rose III. They successfully completed this in 92 days as second team after George Harbo and Frank Samuelsen in 1896. In 1967 Ridgway and Blyth were awarded the Medal of the Order of the British Empire for Meritorious Service for their trip which had until then been considered impossible.

In 1964, he married Marie Christine d’Albiac, daughter of Air Marshal Sir John d'Albiac.

Ridgway entered the Sunday Times Golden Globe Race in 1968 with his sloop English Rose IV, in an attempt to become the first person to sail single-handed non-stop around the world, but retired from the race in Recife, Brazil. In 1969, he founded the John Ridgway School of Adventure at Ardmore, Sutherland, Scotland. It is now managed by his daughter, Rebecca. In 1977–78 Ridgway raced his yacht Debenhams in the Whitbread Round the World Race.

In 1983/4, Ridgway and Andy Briggs sailed the school's 57-foot ketch, English Rose VI, in a non-stop passage round the world, setting (what was then) a 203-day record. In 1987, he was awarded the Mungo Park Medal of the Royal Scottish Geographical Society. In 2003/4, Ridgway circumnavigated the globe in English Rose VI, a campaign under the flag of the UN Environment Programme to highlight the plight of albatrosses.

Ridgway served with the Special Air Service (SAS).

== Bibliography ==
- A Fighting Chance. with Chay Blyth, Pan Books / Readers Book Club, 1966, ISBN 9780330020411.
- Journey to Ardmore. Hodder & Stoughton Ltd, 1971, ISBN 9780340125120.
- Cockleshell Journey: The adventures of three men and a girl. Travel Book Club, 1975, ISBN 9780340174319.
- Storm Passage: A Winter's Voyage to the Sun. Quality Book Club, 1977, ISBN 9780340198247.
- Round the World with John Ridgway. with Marie C. Ridgway, William Heinemann Ltd, 1978, ISBN 9780030437519.
- Round the World Non-Stop. with Andrew Briggs, Round the World Non-Stop, 1985, ISBN 9780850597578.
- Road to Osambre. 1986, ISBN 0-670-81650-7.
- Flood Tide. Hodder & Stoughton, 1989, ISBN 9780340320273.
- Then We Sailed Away. with Marie C. Ridgway and Rebecca Ridgway, Little Brown, 1996, ISBN 9780316877091.
