= Chay Blyth =

Scottish yachtsman and rower

Sir Charles Blyth CBE BEM
- Born: 14 May 1940 (age 85)
- Occupation: Sailor
- Known for: First person to sail single-handed non-stop westwards around the world

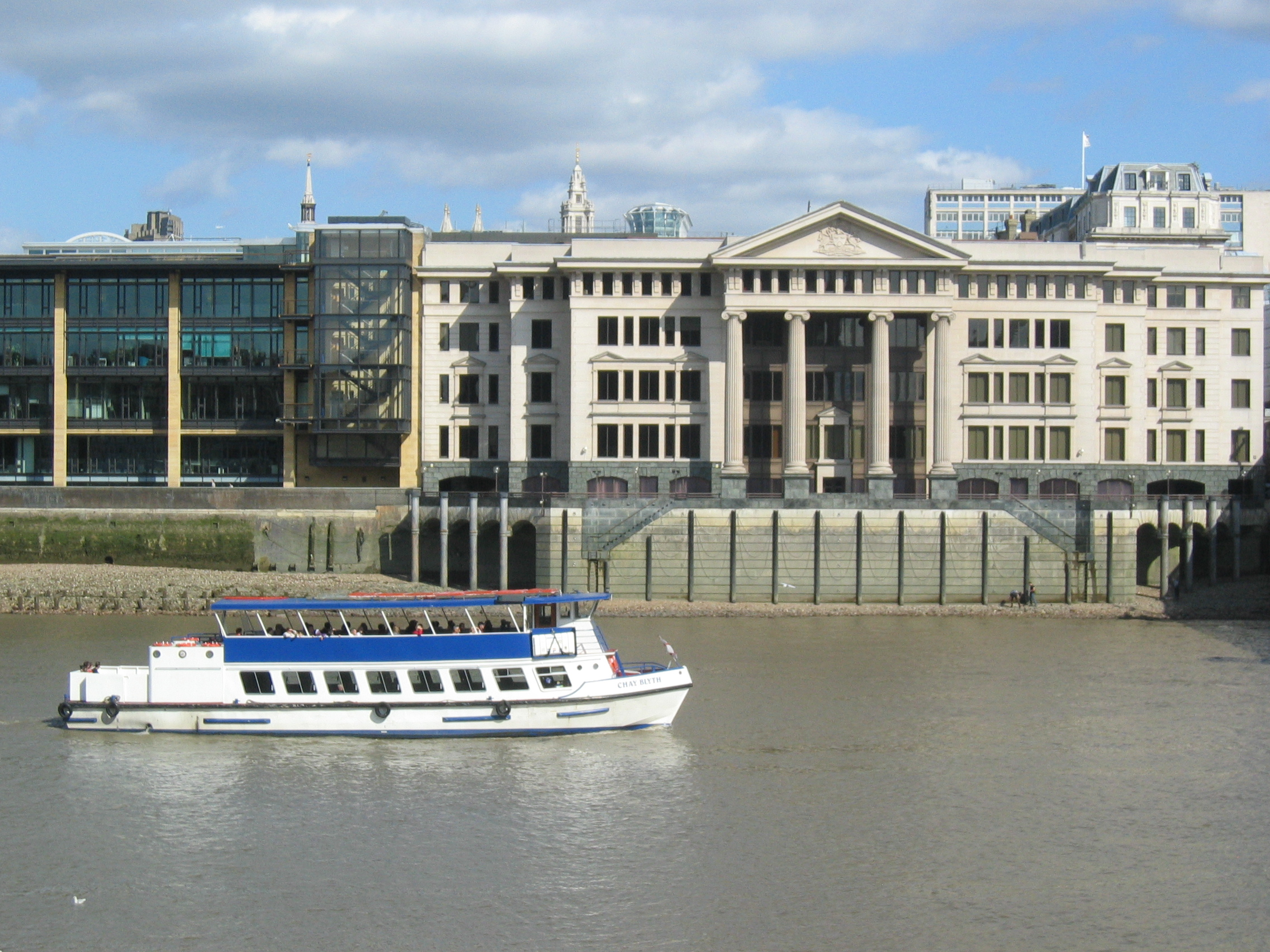
Cruise boat Chay Blyth on the Thames in front of Vintners' Place.

Sir Charles Blyth CBE BEM (born 14 May 1940), known as Chay Blyth, is a Scottish yachtsman and rower. He was the first person to sail single-handed non-stop westwards around the world (1971), on a 59-foot boat called British Steel.

== Early life ==
Blyth was born in Hawick, Roxburghshire. He joined the Parachute Regiment when he was 18 and was promoted to Sergeant at the age of 21.

== Rowing and sailing career ==
Year	
1966	While in the army, Blyth, together with Captain John Ridgway, rowed across the North Atlantic in a 20 ft open dory called English Rose III. After completing this in 92 days, Blyth was awarded the British Empire Medal (BEM) in the 1967 Birthday Honours.
1968	With no sailing experience, Blyth competed in the Sunday Times Golden Globe Race, aboard a 30 ft yacht called Dytiscus. He retired from the race just past the Cape of Good Hope. The author, Peter Nichols, wrote that "Few people leaving a dock for an afternoon sail in a dinghy have cast off with less experience than Chay Blyth had when he set sail alone around the world".
1971	Blyth became the first person to sail non-stop westwards around the world, aboard the yacht British Steel, taking 292 days, and as a result was made a Commander of the Order of the British Empire (CBE) in the 1972 New Year Honours for services to sailing.
1973	Blyth skippered a crew of paratroopers in the yacht Great Britain II, which took line honours in the 3rd stage of the Whitbread Round the World Yacht Race.
1978	He won the Round Britain Race in the yacht Great Britain IV.
1981	Entered the Whitbread race again in the yacht "United Friendly" and was the first British yacht to finish.
1981	On the yacht "Brittany Ferries GB" he won the Two-Handed Trans-Atlantic Race with co-skipper Rob James in record time.
1981	Came second again in the Round the Island Race (Isle of Wight).
1982	Came second overall and first in class in the Round Britain and Ireland Race on "Brittany Ferries GB".
1984	Capsized off Cape Horn aboard the trimaran "Beefeater II" while attempting to break the New York – San Francisco record with Eric Blunn. Rescued by passing fishing boat after 19 hours in the water.
1985	Co-skipper with Richard Branson on Virgin Atlantic Challenger I
1986	Co-skipper with Richard Branson on Virgin Atlantic Challenger II

== Business career ==
Blyth founded a company named Challenge Business to organise the 1992–1993 British Steel Challenge in 1989. This event allowed novices to sail around the world in a professionally organised race. After the British Steel Challenge, Global Challenge organized other Round the World yacht races.

The British Steel Challenge was followed by two successive BT Global Challenge races in 1996−1997 and 2000–2001. A downturn in the sponsorship market meant that the 2004–2005 Global Challenge race set off without a title sponsor. In September 2007, Challenge Business went into administration, when Blyth had been unable to find a sponsor for the 2008–2009 Global Challenge Race.

While chairman of Challenge Business, Blyth was the mentor for Dee Caffari on her successful bid to be the first woman to sail around the world against the prevailing winds and currents in 2005–2006.

As chairman of Inspiring Performance, Blyth also headed the board of directors of the train operating company First Great Western – Greater Western franchise. He became non-executive chairman of the franchise which was formed to run a new and enlarged service from 1 April 2006. The franchise combines the previous First Great Western, First Great Western Link and Wessex Trains franchises.

== Awards and accolades ==
- In the 1997 Birthday Honours, Blyth was created a Knight Bachelor for services to sailing.
- A street has been named after him in his birth town of Hawick, known as "Chay Blyth Place".
- 3rd Worthing Scout Groups Blyth Cub Pack is named after him.
- Awarded an Honorary Doctorate of Technology from Plymouth University in 1994.
- The Chartered Institute of Marketing awarded The Companion of Honour to Sir Chay in 2000 for his services to the Profession of Marketing.
