= Kirsten Neuschäfer =

South African sailor, cyclist, and adventurer (b. 1982)

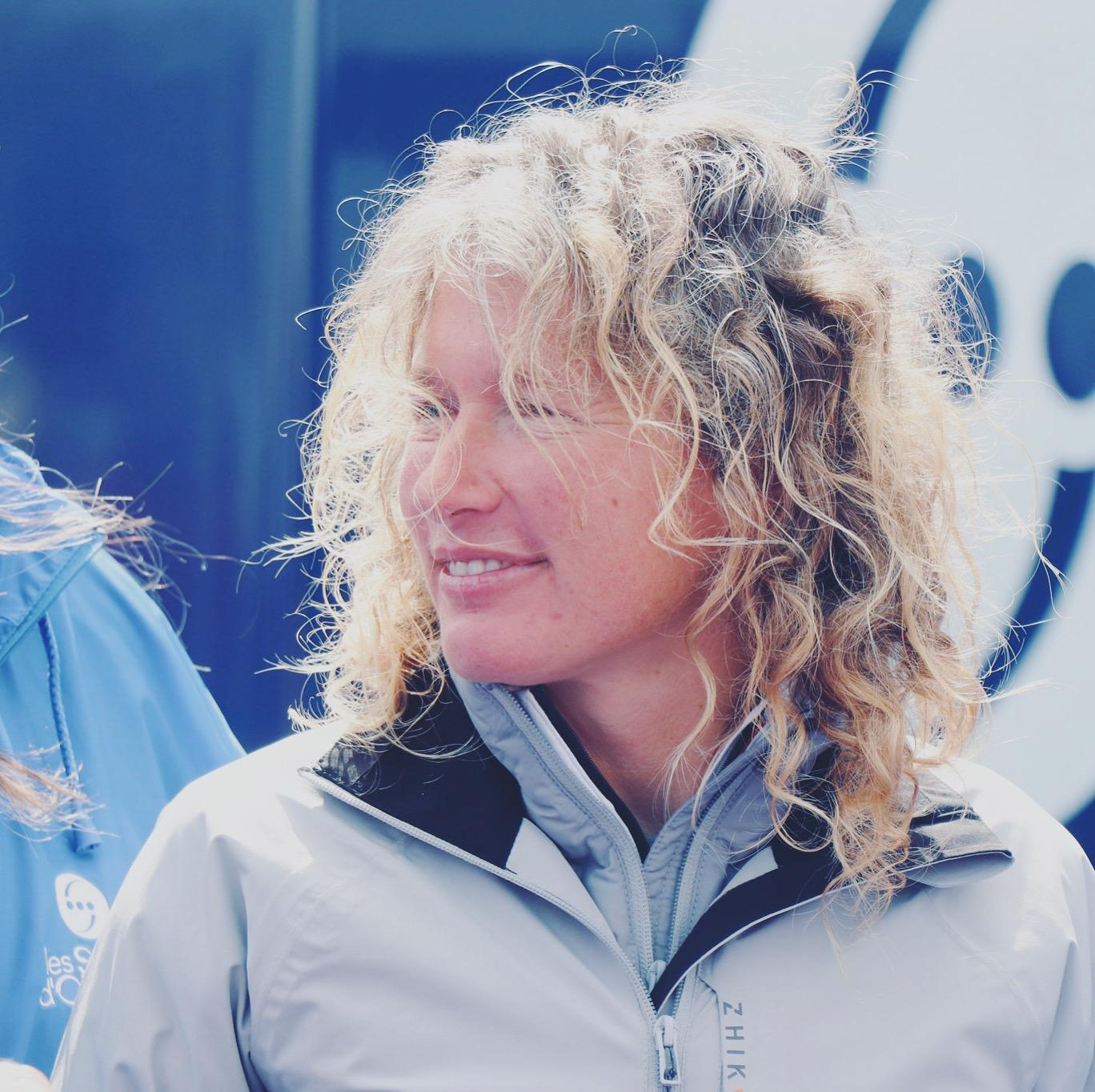

Personal information
- Born: 23 June 1982 (age 44) South Africa
- Home town: Gqeberha, South Africa
- Education: Deutsche Internationale Schule Pretoria
- Website: kirstenggr.com

Sport
- Country: South Africa
- Sport: Sailor

Kirsten Neuschäfer (born 23 June 1982) is a South African sailor specializing in high latitude and high adventure sailing. She is the winner of the 2022 Golden Globe Race, the first woman to win that race since it started in 1968; it also made her the first woman to win any solo round the world race by the three great capes, non-stop or with stops; and the first South African sailor to win a round-the-world event.

== Sailing career ==
Neuschäfer started sailing dinghies as a child, also sailing at Transvaal yacht club (the oldest inland yacht club in Africa), and has been working as a professional sailor since 2006. She worked as a sailor doing charter deliveries, before she specialized in high latitude sailing, taking film crews to places like South Georgia, the Falklands, Patagonia and the Antarctic peninsula.

=== 2022 Golden Globe Race ===
The GGR is a retro sailing race in which the entrants single-handedly circumnavigate around the globe, solo, nonstop by using boats with technology only available to someone in 1968, such as relying on manual celestial navigation, without the use of modern electronic equipment such as cell phones, autopilot, radar or satellite communications.

During the race, she rescued a fellow entrant, Tapio Lehtinen, after Lehtinen's boat sank and he spent over 24 hours adrift in the southern Indian Ocean. In January 2023, she was awarded the Rod Stephens Seamanship Trophy by the Cruising Club of America and the Ocean Cruising Club's (OCC) Seamanship Award for her role in this rescue operation. She led the fleet in 2022 GGR after rounding the Cape Horn and became the first woman to win this round the world race.

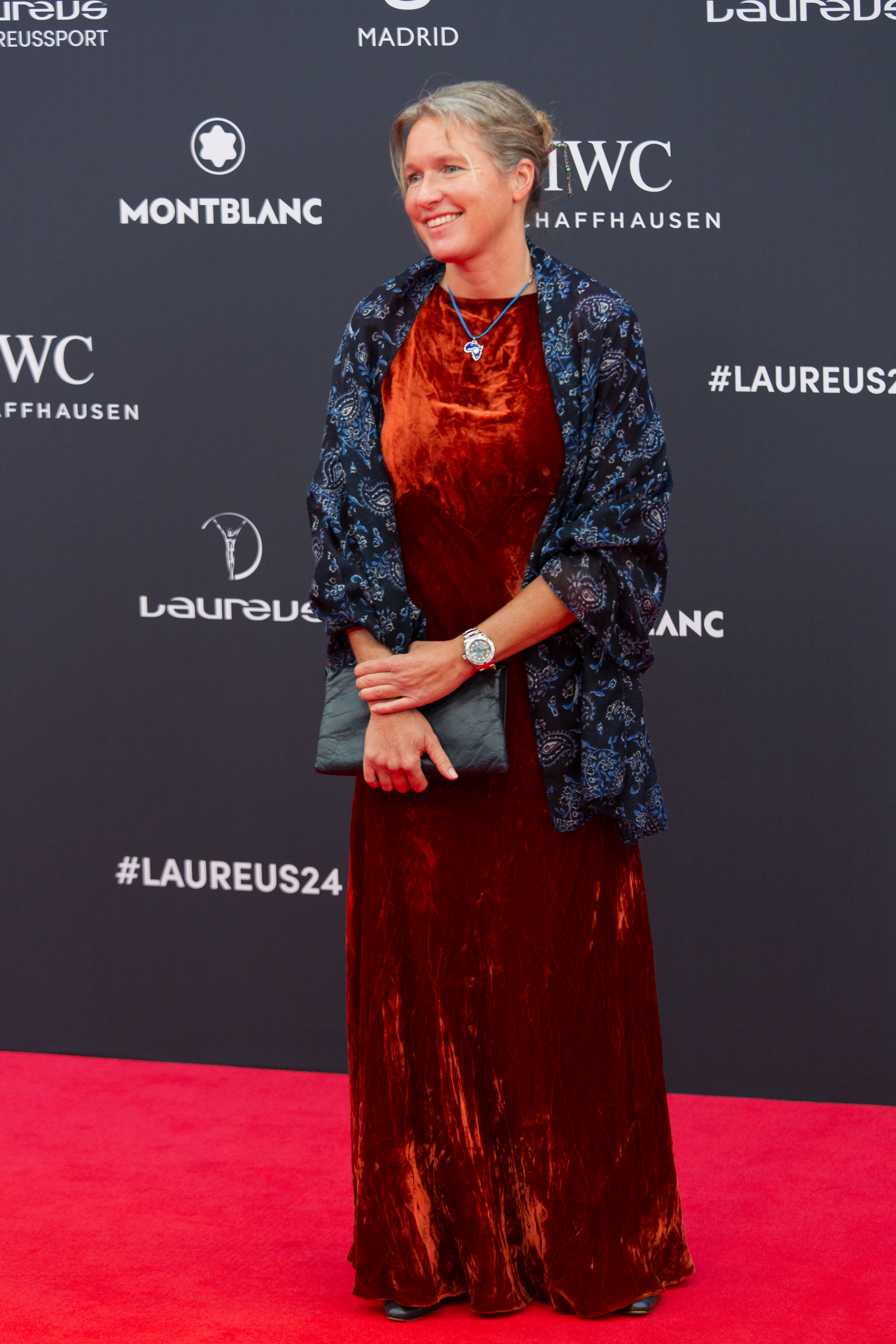
Kirsten Neuschäfer on the red carpet at the 25th Laureus World Sports Awards, nominated for the Action Sportsperson of the Year award following her historic victory in the 2022 Golden Globe Race.

Neuschäfer is the first woman to complete the Golden Globe Race (GGR) in the race's history, the first woman to win the GGR, and the only woman skipper who participated in the 2022 Golden Globe Race. According to the International Association of Cape Horner's records, Neuschäfer is the seventh woman to circumnavigate the globe solo nonstop via the great capes in yachts under 18m. She is the first woman to win any solo round the world race by the three great capes, non-stop or with stops, and the first South African sailor to win a round-the-world event.

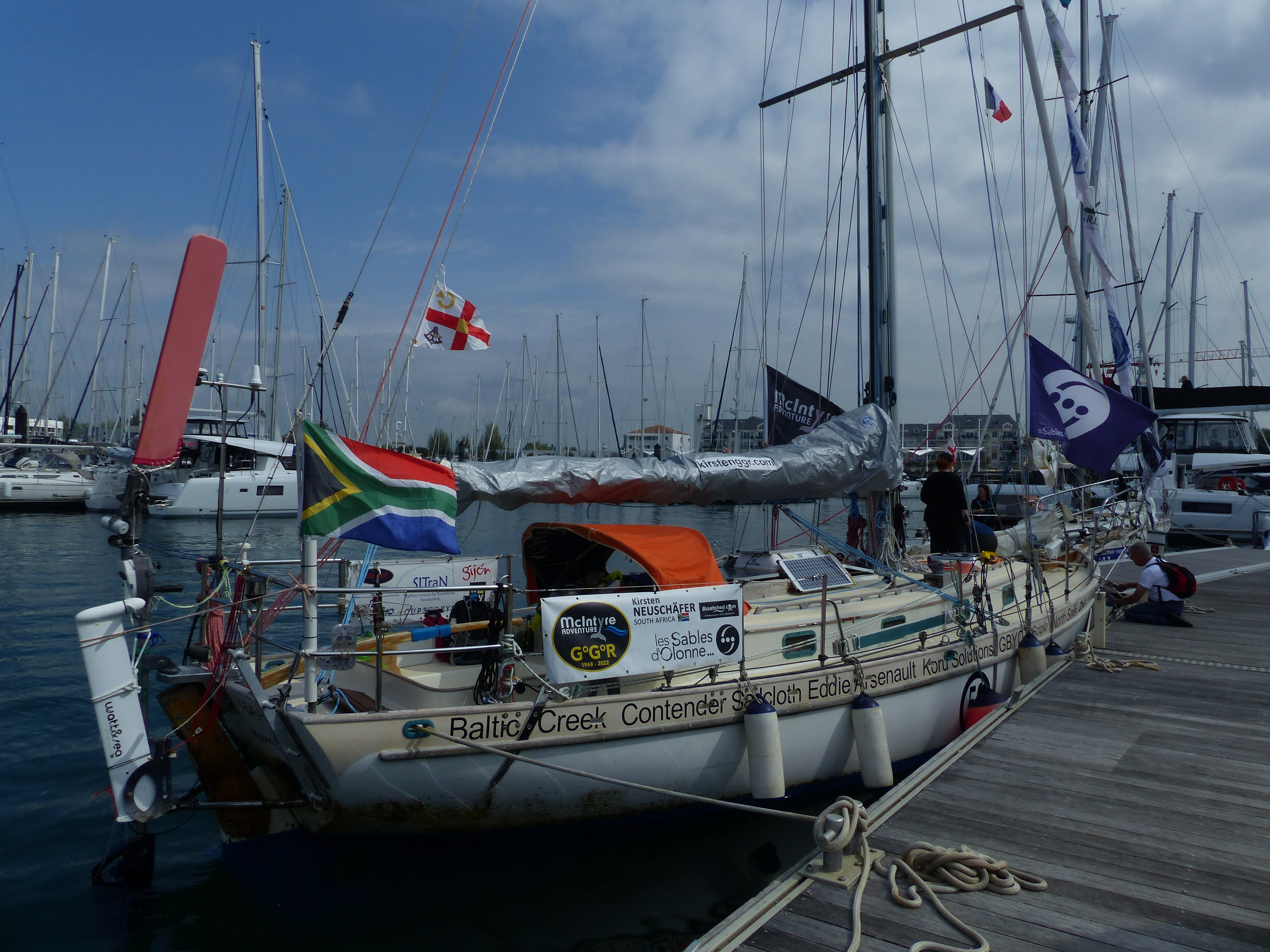
Kirsten Neuschäfer's boat Minnehaha

Her boat Minnehaha is a Cape George 36 built in Port Townsend, Washington, launched in 1988. Neuschäfer spent a year in Prince Edward Island (PEI) while refitting her boat in preparation for the 2022 GGR. Lennie Gallant, a singer-songwriter from PEI, wrote and performed a song, On the Minnehaha, about Neuschäfer and her GGR journey. Some of the islanders who took part in refitting of Minnehaha, including shipwright Eddie Arsenault, appear in the music video. Gallant's song was played upon Neuschäfer's arrival in Les Sables D'olonne as the leading skipper of the race. The song is also used in GGR's video compilation of Neuschäfer's victory.

== Other accomplishments ==
She attended Deutsche Internationale Schule Pretoria; she matriculated in 2000.

At age 22, Neuschäfer pursued another solitary adventure and cycled across Africa from north to south. She started her journey in Germany, and cycled throughout the Northwest and Central Africa into Southern Africa and completed her trip in Cape Agulhas.
