= Suhaili =

Bermudan ketch

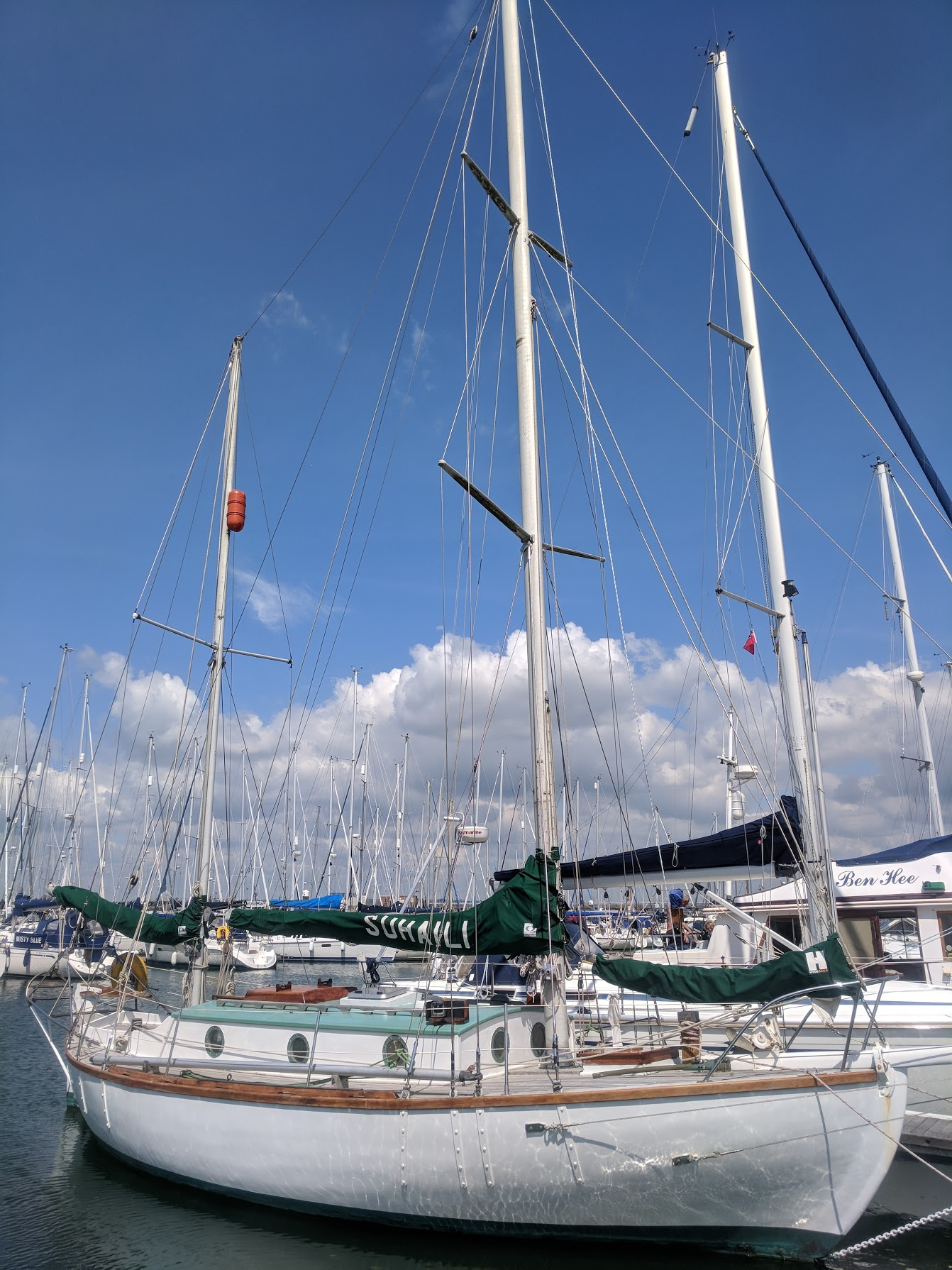
- Sailing vessel Suhaili in Gosport, UK in 2018
- Sail no: 306242
- Designer(s): William Atkin
- Launched: 1963
- Owner(s): Robin Knox-Johnston

Racing career
- Skippers: Robin Knox-Johnston
- Notable victories: Sunday Times Golden Globe Race

Specifications
- Displacement: 9,876 kg (9.720 long tons; 10.886 short tons)
- Length: 9.8 m (32 ft)
- Sail area: 61.8 m^{2} (665 sq ft)

Suhaili is the name of the 32-foot (9.8 m) Bermudan ketch sailed by Sir Robin Knox-Johnston in the first non-stop solo circumnavigation of the world in the Sunday Times Golden Globe Race.

== Design and construction ==
Suhaili was built in Mumbai with the help of the Royal Bombay Yacht Club, India in 1963. She follows plans designed by William Atkin for Eric in 1923. Her design is based on the Norwegian pilot boat designs of Colin Archer.

Specification
	1963
LOA	13.41 m (44.0 ft)
LWL	8.53 m (28.0 ft)
Beam	3.37 m (11.1 ft)
Draught	1.67 m (5.5 ft)
Thames Tonnage	14
Net Tonnage	6.29 Tons
Keelson	1’ 2” x 10" - 22 ft in Length
Planking	1 ¼" Indian Teak

== Notable appearances ==
In 1997 Suhaili went to the National Maritime Museum at Greenwich as an exhibit, but the controlled atmosphere began to shrink her planking, and, unwilling to see her die this way, Sir Robin Knox-Johnston removed her to Falmouth, Cornwall in 2002 and re-fitted her again. She still belongs to Knox-Johnston and was re-fastened at the Elephant Boatyard at Bursledon, near Southampton. The objective was to get her back into commission and Knox-Johnston duly took delivery in February 2020, as reported in an Elephant Boatyard Facebook post.

Suhaili was one of a number of prestigious vessels moored along the route of the Thames Diamond Jubilee Pageant, to celebrate the diamond jubilee of Queen Elizabeth II. Due to her size, she was not part of the flotilla, and was instead moored with other vessels at St Katharine Docks, in a display known as the Avenue of Sail.
