= Ohpen =

- Type: Private
- Industry: Financial technology
- Founded: 2009
- Founder: Chris Zadeh
- Headquarters: Rokin 111, 1012KN, Amsterdam, Amsterdam, Netherlands
- Number of locations: 5: Amsterdam, London, Barcelona, Bratislava and Zilina
- Area served: Global
- Key people: Matthijs Aler, CEO; Marcin Klecha, CTO; Douwe Bijl, CFO; Jan-Lamber Voortman, COO; Leni Boeren, Chair of Supervisory Board; Michel Vrolijk, Member of Supervisory Board; Martijn Koster, Member of Supervisory Board; Koen Köppen, Member of Supervisory Board
- Products: Cloud-based banking platform
- Services: Financial Technology
- Revenue: $30,000,000
- Total assets: $150,000,000,000
- Number of employees: 240
- Website: Official website

Ohpen is a Dutch financial technology company that built the first core-banking platform in the cloud. Ohpen is a platform for mortgage/consumer lending origination and the administration of savings-, investment- and mortgage products. The company provides a cloud-based alternative for financial institutions such as banks, mortgage lenders, building societies and pension funds to legacy systems and processes. More than 300 people work at the company's Amsterdam headquarters and its offices in London, Barcelona, Bratislava and Zilina.

== History ==
Ohpen was founded by Chris Zadeh in 2009 in Amsterdam with a team composed largely of former employees of the Dutch independent broker, BinckBank. Zadeh began working on the platform after opening an Amazon Web Services (AWS) account in 2008. In 2009, the company received private equity and began building its core banking platform on AWS. At the outset, Ohpen also offered asset management services and, in 2010, acquired the Dutch insurer and asset management firm, Robein Leven from Van Lanschot Kempen.

Ohpen had a minimum viable product by April 2010 and its first client by 2012. In 2013, De Nederlandsche Bank approved the AWS cloud for use in all banking applications. The company's first major client, Robeco (an asset management firm), replaced its 25 year-old legacy system with the Ohpen back office and customer relationship management platforms in 2013. In June 2014, Ohpen sold its asset management business and began to focus solely on developing cloud banking software.

In 2015, the company had around 60 employees and managed over 200,000 investment and savings accounts on its platform. In December 2016, Ohpen signed a long-term agreement with the Dutch state-owned bank, De Volksbank (then known as SNS Bank), to provide business process outsourcing and core banking services to De Volksbank and its subsidiaries, ASN Bank, BLG Wonen, and RegioBank. De Volksbank and its subsidiaries now operate as ASN Bank. The company also announced the opening of operations in the United Kingdom as Ohpen UK with Angelique Schouten heading up the company as its CEO and gaining approval from the Financial Conduct Authority, the UK financial regulatory body, for Ohpen's operations in the country in January 2017. In April 2017, Ohpen partnered with Aegon, a multinational financial conglomerate, to provide its core banking platform for use. In July 2017, Ohpen raised €15 million ($17 million) in a series B funding round led by private equity firm, Amerborgh. This increased the company's valuation to €100 million ($114 million). In September 2017, the company acquired FYNN Advice, another Dutch implementation specialist for financial technology.

Ohpen raised €25 million in Series C funding in February 2018. In July 2018, LeasePlan Bank migrated close to 1 million Dutch and German savings account to the Ohpen platform In September 2020, Ohpen acquired cross-border loan and mortgages Software as a Service (SaaS) provider Davinci. This acquisition makes Ohpen the only cloud-native core banking engine to offer a full suite of products across savings, investments, loans, mortgages and current accounts. January 1, 2019, Ohpen appointed Matthijs Aler as its new CEO.

Ohpen created a new mortgages solution for the UK market and in November 2023, April Mortgages went live using Ohpen's newly built mortgages origination and servicing platform.

== Platform ==
Ohpen's primary offering is a cloud-based banking platform that runs on Amazon Web Services (AWS). Its clients consist of large financial institutions. The system operates as one open API that clients can connect to on the front end. Its core modules include savings accounts, investment accounts, consumer lending, mortgages, payments, CRM, robo advice, reporting and analytics, user management and settings, audit, risk and fraud management, and order and fund management. Banks can outsource the management of their core services like savings, wealth management, lending, pensions, and other services.
