= Greenway Camp =

Iron Age hill fort in south Devon, England

Coordinates: 50.372°N 3.5641°W

Greenway Camp (also called Noss) is an Iron Age hill fort in the parish of Kingswear close to Dartmouth in Devon, England. The fort is situated on the south western slope of a promontory on the eastern side of a hill west of the village of Hillhead some 65–80 metres (215–260 ft) above sea level overlooking Noss Point in the Dart Estuary.
