= Robin Knox-Johnston =

British yacht racer (born 1939)

Sir Robin Knox-Johnston CBE RD*
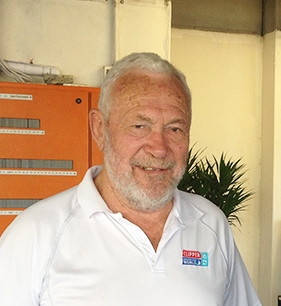
- Knox-Johnston in 2013
- Born: William Robert Patrick Knox-Johnston; 17 March 1939 (age 87); Putney, London, England
- Occupation: Sailor
- Known for: First single-handed non-stop circumnavigation of the globe
- Spouses: Suzanne Singer (m. 1962; div. 1967) (m. 1972; died 2003)
- Children: 1
- Website: robinknox-johnston.co.uk

Sir William Robert Patrick Knox-Johnston CBE RD* (born 17 March 1939) is a British sailor. In 1969, he became the first person to perform a single-handed non-stop circumnavigation of the globe. Along with Sir Peter Blake, in 1994 Knox-Johnston won the second Jules Verne Trophy, for which they were also given the ISAF World Sailor of the Year Awards. In 2007, at the age of 67, he set a record as the oldest yachtsman to complete a round the world solo voyage in the Velux 5 Oceans Race.

== Personal life ==
=== Early life ===
Knox-Johnston was born in Putney, London. His birth was registered in Wandsworth in 1939. He was the eldest child of David R Knox-Johnston (1910-1970) and Elizabeth Magill née Cree (1908-1977), who were married in Tring, in 1937.

Knox-Johnston was educated at the Berkhamsted boys' school. From 1957 to 1968, he served in the Merchant Navy and the Royal Naval Reserve. In 1965, he began to sail his William Atkin design ketch Suhaili from Bombay to England. Her design is based on the Norwegian sailing lifeboat designs of Colin Archer.

Due to a lack of money, he had to interrupt his voyage for work in South Africa as Master of a coaster and stevedoring and was only able to complete it in 1967. In 1968, he was one of nine sailors who attempted to achieve the first solo non-stop circumnavigation of the world in the Sunday Times Golden Globe Race. He was the third sailor to start the race, and the only one to complete the voyage.

=== Family ===
In early 1962, in Cambridge, he married Suzanne (Sue) Singer, whom he had known from the age of eight; they had one daughter, Sara, who was born in Bombay whilst he was at sea. His wife left him when he proposed taking her and the child back to England in his new boat Suhaili, and they were divorced in 1967. However, in 1972 they remarried in Winchester, and had five grandchildren, Florence, Oscar, Xavier, Ralph, and Valentine. Sue died in 2003.

== Circumnavigation of the Earth ==
The route of the Golden Globe Race

On 14 June 1968, Knox-Johnston left Falmouth in his 32-foot (9.8-metre) boat Suhaili, one of the smallest boats to enter the Sunday Times Golden Globe Race. Despite losing his self-steering gear off Australia, he rounded Cape Horn on 17 January 1969, 20 days before his closest competitor Bernard Moitessier. Moitessier had sailed from Plymouth more than two months after Knox-Johnston, but he subsequently abandoned the race and instead sailed on to Tahiti. The other seven competitors dropped out at various stages, leaving Knox-Johnston to win the race and become officially the first person to circumnavigate the globe non-stop and single-handed on 22 April 1969, the day he returned to Falmouth. Knox-Johnston donated his prize money for the fastest competitor, a sum of £5,000, to the family of Donald Crowhurst, another competitor in the race who had committed suicide after attempting to fake his round the world voyage.

In recognition of his achievement, he was appointed a Commander of the Order of the British Empire (CBE) in the 1969 Birthday Honours for seafaring.

Knox-Johnston later persuaded African-American sailor Bill Pinkney to follow the southern route around the Capes, rather than using the Panama and Suez canals to circumnavigate the Earth, and to become the first Black man to do so.

== Further exploits and later life ==
In 1970 (with Leslie Williams) and in 1974 (with Gerry Boxall), Knox-Johnston won the two-handed Round Britain Race. Knox-Johnston, Williams and their crew, which included Peter Blake, took line honours of the 1971 Cape Town to Rio Race. Williams and Knox-Johnston jointly skippered (with Blake a crew member again) the maxi yacht Heath's Condor in the 1977 Whitbread Round the World Race. They took the line honours in the second and fourth leg, the ones which Knox-Johnston skippered.

Knox-Johnston and Blake (who acted as co-skippers) won the Jules Verne Trophy for the fastest circumnavigation in 1994. Their time was 74 days 22 hours 18 minutes and 22 seconds. It was their second attempt to win this prize after their first one in 1992 had to be aborted when their catamaran Enza hit an object which tore a hole in the starboard hull.

In 1992, he was awarded the Harold Spencer-Jones Gold Medal by the Royal Institute of Navigation in recognition of his contributions to navigation. From 1992 to 2001, Knox-Johnston was president of the Sail Training Association. During his tenure the money was collected to replace the STA's vessels Sir Winston Churchill and Malcolm Miller with the new, larger brigs Prince William and Stavros S. Niarchos. He was trustee of the National Maritime Museum at Greenwich from 1992 to 2002 and still is trustee of the National Maritime Museum – Cornwall at Falmouth, where Suhaili is berthed today. The yacht has been refitted and took part in the Round the Island Race in June 2005.

Knox-Johnston was knighted in the 1995 Birthday Honours for services to yachting. He has been a Liveryman of the Honourable Company of Master Mariners and a Younger Brother of Trinity House.

In 1996, Knox-Johnston established the first Clipper Round the World Yacht Race and has since worked with Clipper Ventures as chairman. He has introduced many people to competitive sailing through their involvement with Clipper Ventures.

He completed his second solo circumnavigation of the world in the yacht Saga Insurance on 4 May 2007, finishing in fourth place in the Velux 5 Oceans Race. At 68, he was the oldest competitor in the race.

In late 2008 and early 2009, Knox-Johnston took part in a BBC programme called Top Dogs: Adventures in War, Sea and Ice. The programme saw him unite with Sir Ranulph Fiennes, the adventurer, and John Simpson, the BBC world affairs editor. The team went on three trips, each experiencing each other's adventure field. The first episode, aired on 27 March 2009, saw Knox-Johnston, Fiennes and Simpson go on a potentially very dangerous news-gathering trip to Afghanistan. The team reported from the legendary Khyber Pass and infamous Tora Bora mountain complex. The three also undertook a voyage around Cape Horn and an expedition hauling sledges across the deep-frozen Frobisher Bay in the far north of Canada.

Having served two years as president of The Cruising Association, Knox-Johnston is now the association's patron. He is also a past-president of the Little Ship Club. He is the current president of Liverpool Yacht Club.

In November 2014, Knox-Johnston, at age 75, finished the solo transatlantic race the Route du Rhum in third place in the Rhum class. He crossed the finish line on his Open 60 Grey Power at Pointe à Pitre at 16:52 hours local time/20:52 hours GMT after 20 days, 7 hours, 52 minutes and 22 seconds at sea.

Knox-Johnston was banned from driving for 18 months in November 2016 after being caught driving at more than twice the legal limit. During the COVID-19 pandemic, he was one of several notable figures interviewed by The Guardian about their experiences with social isolation.

In 2022, Suhaili's compass, which had been stolen soon after the completion of the 1969 circumnavigation, was left at the Holyhead Maritime Museum by the wife of the (now deceased) thief. After display at the museum, it will be returned to Knox-Johnston.

== Books ==
- A World of My Own. 1969, Cassell (reissued 2004 by Adlard Coles Nautical).
- A Voyage for Madmen by Peter Nichols, 2001. HarperCollins Publishers.
- Cape Horn, a maritime adventure 1995. Hodder & Stoughton.
- The Columbus venture. 1991, BBC Books.
- Seamanship 1987. Hodder & Stoughton.
- Force of Nature with Kate Laven, 2007. Michael Joseph, London.
- Face to Face: Ocean Portraits, by Huw Lewis-Jones 2010. ISBN 978-1-84486-124-8, Foreword. Conway and Polarworld.
- Running Free 2019. Simon & Schuster.
- Sea, Ice and Rock With Chris Bonington. Holder & Stoughton 1992.

Records
Preceded by Explorer with Bruno Peyron	Jules Verne Trophy; 1994–1997	Succeeded by Sport Elec with Olivier de Kersauson
