= The Mercy =

2017 British biographical drama film

- British release poster
- Directed by: James Marsh
- Written by: Scott Z. Burns
- Produced by: Graham Broadbent; Scott Z. Burns; Peter Czernin; Nicolas Mauvernay; Jacques Perrin
- Starring: Colin Firth; Rachel Weisz; David Thewlis; Ken Stott
- Cinematography: Éric Gautier
- Edited by: Jinx Godfrey
- Music by: Jóhann Jóhannsson
- Production companies: BBC Films; Blueprint Pictures; Galatée Films
- Distributed by: StudioCanal
- Release dates: 28 November 2017 (BAFTA New York); 9 February 2018 (United Kingdom)
- Running time: 101 minutes
- Country: United Kingdom
- Language: English
- Budget: $27 million
- Box office: $4.5 million

The Mercy is a 2017 British biographical drama film, directed by James Marsh and written by Scott Z. Burns. It is based on the true story of the disastrous attempt by the amateur sailor Donald Crowhurst to complete the Sunday Times Golden Globe Race in 1968 and his subsequent attempts to cover up his failure. The film stars Colin Firth, Rachel Weisz, David Thewlis and Ken Stott. It is one of the last films scored by Icelandic composer Jóhann Jóhannsson.

The film was released in the United Kingdom on 9 February 2018 by StudioCanal.

== Plot ==
In 1968, English businessman Donald Crowhurst is inspired by Sir Francis Chichester to compete in the Sunday Times Golden Globe Race, a single-handed, round-the-world yacht race. Though only an amateur sailor, Crowhurst believes that technology and gumption will enable him to succeed in a custom trimaran, thus ensuring financial security for his wife and young children. As delays and costs mount, however, Crowhurst is forced to sign promissory notes pledging his company and home to his main sponsor Stanley Best, should he fail to finish. Barely ready in time for the race, Crowhurst must complete the race or lose everything he holds dear.

During his trip in the Teignmouth Electron he attempts to give an optimistic version of events to both his family and press agent, but inwardly feels under pressure due to his financial situation, physical danger and loneliness. The film cuts between his voyage and scenes at home where his wife Clare is attempting to deal with the situation.

To make matters worse for Crowhurst, his boat is damaged, making his journey forward extremely risky. He begins to falsify his records, greatly exaggerating how far he has sailed each day. Crowhurst decides to be vague in his communications, hinting to the newspapers that he is rounding the cape of Africa, while instead sailing slowly and attempting to go unnoticed before returning home. He surreptitiously lands in Argentina to repair the boat.

At home, his apparent success is bringing significant press attention. Robin Knox-Johnston completes the race, but Crowhurst’s false accounts suggest that he will finish the fastest as all other sailors but one have dropped out of the race. Crowhurst slows down his return trip to avoid the attention that finishing fastest would bring, knowing that scrutiny would reveal he had fabricated his earlier location reports.

Upon learning that Nigel Tetley, the other sailor still in the race has also dropped out because of his false records, he becomes overwhelmed with guilt and fear. He starts to lose his mind and begins to hallucinate and imagines seeing his wife who he confesses to. As his mental health fails, so does his physical health and he is oblivious to harming himself as he attempts to stay occupied by maintaining the radio. Meanwhile the vessel drifts.

As his family, the press and public expectantly wait for his return, he loses all control of his mind and his situation and in despair realises he cannot go home and only has one way out. His vessel is eventually found adrift without Crowhurst onboard. It is not clear if he has jumped or fallen overboard. The authorities deduce from his records that he has lied about his progress during his journey.

In the closing credits it states that Crowhurst‘s body was never found and that he was at sea for 7 months and completed 13,000 miles. Robin Knox-Johnston was the only sailor to finish the race and he donated his prize money to Crowhurst‘s family.

== Cast ==
- Colin Firth as Donald Crowhurst
- Rachel Weisz as Clare Crowhurst
- David Thewlis as Rodney Hallworth
- Ken Stott as Stanley Best
- Jonathan Bailey as Wheeler
- Adrian Schiller as Elliot
- Oliver Maltman as Denis Herbstein
- Mark Gatiss as Ronald Hall of the Sunday Times
- Simon McBurney as Sir Francis Chichester
- Finn Elliot as James Crowhurst
- Kit Connor as Simon Crowhurst
- Eleanor Stagg as Rachel Crowhurst
- Andrew Buchan as Ian Milburn
- Geoff Bladon as Arthur Bladon, town mayor

== Production ==
=== Development ===
On 27 January 2015, it was announced that James Marsh would direct the film, which StudioCanal, Blueprint Pictures, and BBC Films would produce. StudioCanal and BBC would finance the film which had been developed by Christine Langan. StudioCanal would handle the international sales at the European Film Market and would also distribute the film in the UK, France, Germany, Australia and New Zealand. The producers would be Peter Czernin, Graham Broadbent, and Scott Burns, with Nicolas Mauvernay and Jacques Perrin of Galatée Films. On 31 March 2015 Rachel Weisz was reported to be in discussions to play Clare. On 20 May 2015 Weisz was confirmed as Clare, and David Thewlis, Ken Stott and Jonathan Bailey joined the cast. This is the second collaboration of David Thewlis and director James Marsh after The Theory of Everything. Bailey's casting was confirmed by Deadline on 27 May 2015.

=== Filming ===
Principal photography on the film began on location on 20 May 2015 in the United Kingdom. In early June 2015 filming was underway in Teignmouth, Devon, and in mid-June, the production was spotted filming at the Isle of Portland in Dorset. By late July, filming had moved to Malta, where some scenes were planned to be shot in the water tanks at Mediterranean Film Studios in Kalkara. During the filming, Colin Firth was hospitalised with a hip dislocation. The Mercy was also part shot at West London Film Studios. Some scenes were filmed at Chatham Dockyard in Kent, where HMS Gannet was used as the port where the wives of the competition sailors posed for the press. As well as filming at Bewl Water reservoir in Kent, which features as the Teignmouth inlet where Donald Crowhurst (Colin Firth) sails locally alone and with his family.

For the purpose of this film, a full-scale replica of the Teignmouth Electron was constructed by U.K. boatbuilders Heritage Marine, and was used for film sequences shot in England and in Malta. After completion of filming, the replica was purchased by artist Michael Jones McKean, who also owns the original Teignmouth Electron which remains beached at Cayman Brac; the replica is currently dry docked in storage on the island of Malta.

== Release ==
In November 2017, Lionsgate acquired US distribution rights to the film, planning to release it through its subsidiary Roadside Attractions. It was initially scheduled to be released in the United Kingdom on 27 October 2017, but was eventually moved to 9 February 2018. Despite this, it was screened for awards consideration to members of the British Academy of Film and Television Arts in New York City on 28 November 2017, followed by two screenings in Renfrew Street, Glasgow on 5 December and Fountain Park, Edinburgh on 7 December that year.

Noting that another film based on the same story was also being produced, Studiocanal (the producers of The Mercy) purchased the rights to its competitor Crowhurst, promising to release it soon after the release of the larger-budget production.

== Reception ==
On review aggregator Rotten Tomatoes, the film holds an approval rating of 74% based on 82 reviews, with a weighted average rating of 6.24/10. The website's critical consensus reads, "The Mercy sails on Colin Firth's layered central performance, which adds necessary depth and nuance that the story sometimes lacks." On Metacritic, the film has a weighted average score of 60 out of 100, based on 19 critics, indicating "mixed or average reviews".

== See also ==
- Crowhurst, a 2017 film on the same subject directed by Simon Rumley
- Deep Water, a 2006 documentary on the subject
