= Teignmouth Electron =

Former trimaran sailing vessel

Coordinates: 19.6863°N 79.8772°W

Teignmouth Electron (without mast and rigging) shortly after its boatyard launch in September 1968 (still frame from contemporary newsreel or amateur footage, as reproduced in the documentary "Deep Water")

Teignmouth Electron was a 41-foot trimaran sailing vessel designed explicitly for Donald Crowhurst’s ill-fated attempt to sail around the world in the Golden Globe Race of 1968. It became a ghost ship after Crowhurst reported false positions and is presumed to have committed suicide at sea. The journey was meticulously catalogued in Crowhurst's found logbooks, which also documented the captain's thoughts, philosophy, and eventual mental breakdown. Sold after its recovery, the vessel passed through several subsequent hands, being re-purposed and re-fitted as a cruise vessel and later, dive boat, before eventually being beached in a damaged state at Cayman Brac, a small Caribbean island, where its remains were still visible as of 2019 but in an advanced state of decay.

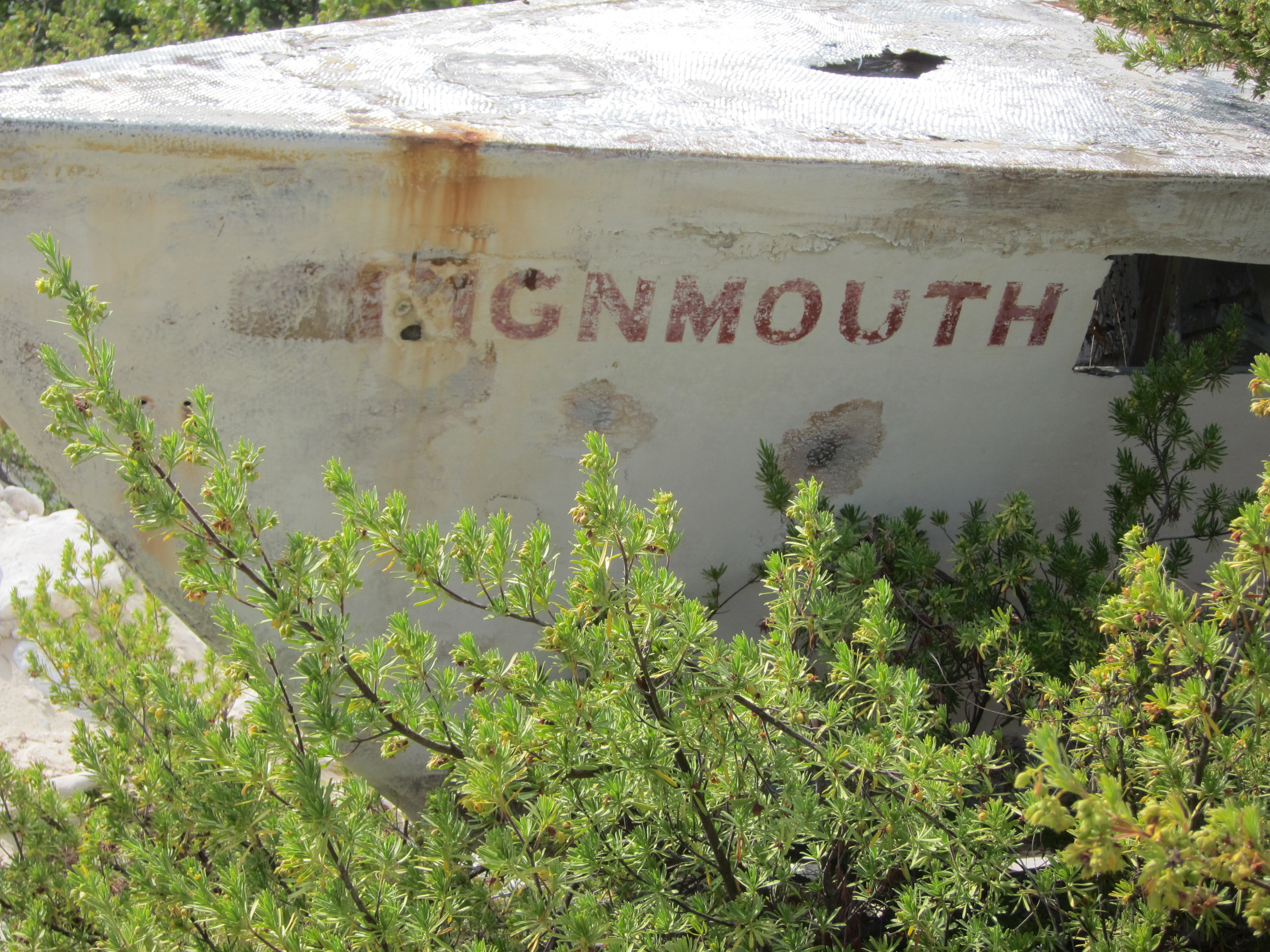
Remains of part of the bow of the beached Teignmouth Electron on Cayman Brac, photographed in March 2011, showing the name Teignmouth and part of the hole where a souvenir hunter has removed Electron.

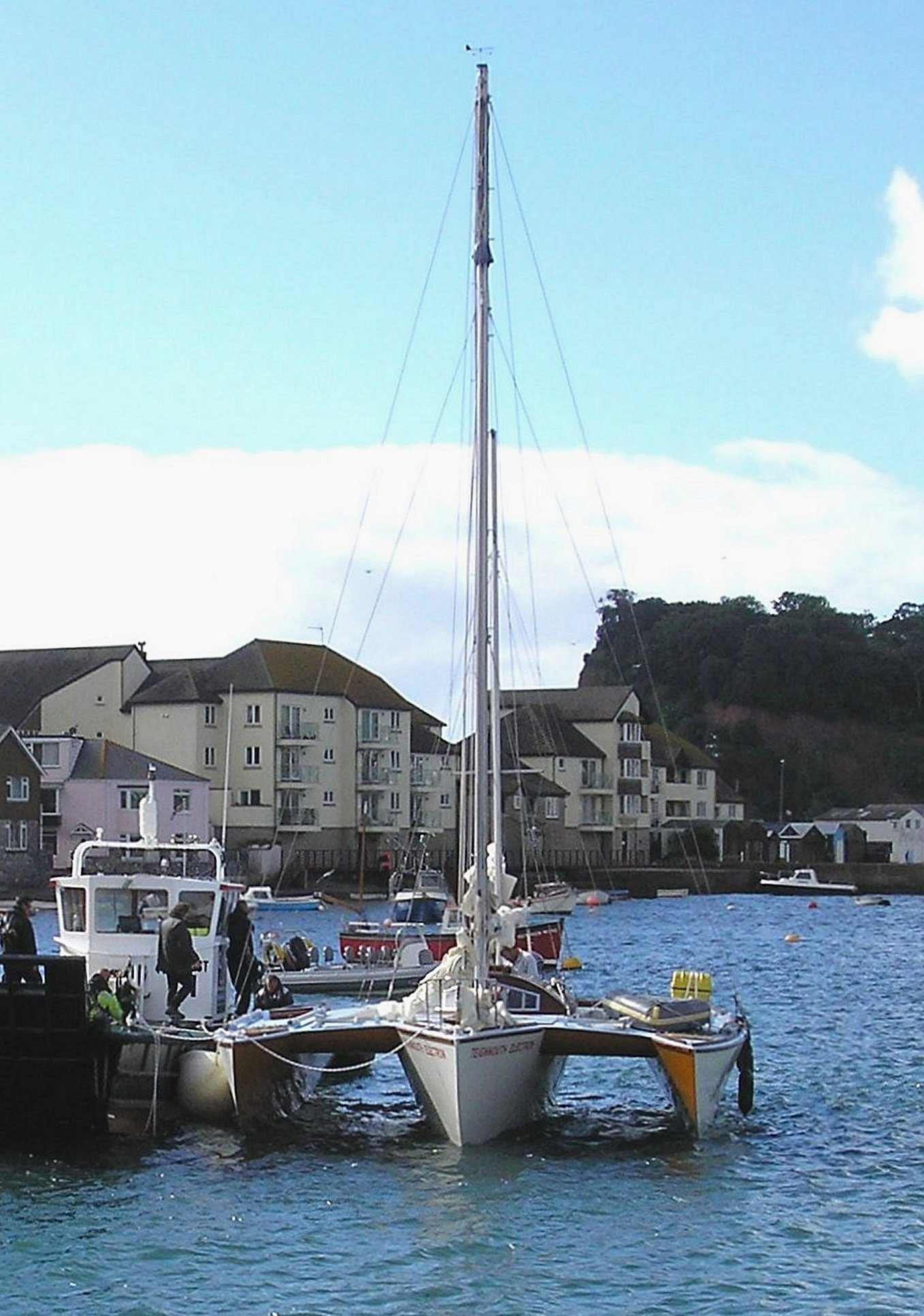
Full scale replica of Teignmouth Electron photographed in Teignmouth harbour during the shoot for the 2017 movie "The Mercy", June 2015

== Design and construction ==
Construction on Teignmouth Electron began in June 1968 after Crowhurst failed to acquire the vessel Gipsy Moth IV, previously sailed by Sir Francis Chichester in his 1967 circumnavigation. Construction of the boat (estimated at £6,000—almost £90,000 in 2025 pounds, although final costs were around double this figure) was funded by local successful businessman Stanley Best, who had already invested £1,000 in Crowhurst's business, Electron Utilisation, and hoped by this means to recoup not only his investment in Electron Utilisation, but also acquire publicity for his own business in the event of Crowhurst's successful return. (In the event of non-completion, Best's sponsorship deal also included a clause that Electron Utilisation could be obliged to purchase the boat from him, which however might also bankrupt the fledgling company so would not in fact supply the "safety net" that Best may have envisaged). The boat was named first after the town of Teignmouth, Devon, England, as part of a deal with Crowhurst's publicist Rodney Hallworth who, as public relations officer for Teignmouth Town Council, hoped to leverage the name to attract additional local sponsorship (which apparently did not eventuate), in addition to "Electron" from the first part of the name of Crowhurst's business.

With only secondhand accounts to guide him, Crowhurst had become convinced that the trimaran model, with its potential for extreme speed, would serve him best to win the race. The Electron was based on designs for Arthur Piver's Victress-class trimaran. However, significant structural and aesthetic deviations from the original designs were made at Crowhurst's request, in order to make the boat more suitable for the long journey through rough seas. Due to the significantly short window in which the boat was constructed, Crowhurst chose to have the hulls fabricated at Cox Marine Ltd. in Brightlingsea (who had the approved concession to construct Piver Trimarans in the UK); because Cox Marine did not have the capacity to then complete the fit-out within Crowhurst's desired time frame, it was agreed that the hulls would then be shipped to L.J. Eastwood Ltd. of Brundall, Norfolk for final fit and completion.

The Brundall shipyard had two partners, John Eastwood and John Elliot. Eastwood acted as the main boatbuilder and engineer. According to Eastwood, many of the Electron's modifications were made in order to accommodate numerous technological and electronic inventions meant primarily for preventing the boat from capsizing in large seas. Because of its multi-hulled design, a trimaran is fast and fairly stable due to its weight dispersal over a large surface area. However, it cannot right itself if capsized like a mono-hulled boat would be able to. Crowhurst, anxious about the rough waters of the Roaring Forties and Cape Horn, had plans to install a buoyancy bag on the mainmast. This bag would inflate when the main "computer" on board sensed the boat was tipping. In theory, this would keep the boat at a rightable 90-degree angle. However, due to severe time and capital constraints, Crowhurst's "computer" was never installed in the boat. (Note: Crowhurst's "computer" was not really what we would understand by that term today, namely a "machine that can be programmed to automatically carry out sequences of arithmetic or logical operations" (see computer), but what Tomalin & Hall refer to as a "central switching mechanism" that would electronically monitor water levels in the floats (to detect a capsize), unusual stresses in the rigging, or abrupt changes in wind speed, and activate various circuits accordingly. Although potentially a significant step towards (possibly the first) electronically controlled yacht, regrettably the "computer" was merely a mass of components at the commencement of the voyage, notionally to be worked upon further during the voyage but never actually finished.)

The additional weight of the buoyancy bag meant that the main mast had to be shortened by four feet from the original Victress model. The masts were made of aluminium alloy and were supplied by International Yacht Equipment Ltd. Extra bulkheads were also added—four each on the starboard and port side floats and three in the centre hull. This translated to a deck design with an unusual amount of hatches. Additionally, these hatches were inadequately sealed due to a shortage of the appropriate stock of soft rubber needed to create a watertight seal. A harder, less malleable alternative was substituted which made the possibility of leaking much greater.

On the deck, two layers of 3/8-inch marine ply were used instead of the typical single layer. The double layering allowed for staggering the joints to alleviate any high-stress points that could buckle under the extreme expansion and compression they would face in the open ocean. The design included four reinforced crossarms with three—or in the case of the forward crossarm, four—vertical runs of plywood spanning the entire beam of the boat, connecting the port, main hull and starboard floats together. This required the main mast to be positioned atop the forward, reinforced crossarm.

Additionally, against Crowhurst's wishes and the original Victress designs, the decking was painted with double polyurethane paint as opposed to being sheathed in a fibreglass skin as the hulls had been by Cox Marine Ltd. While this did not present a structural issue, it created greater aesthetic deviation from the Victress design. The boat was completed just days before the race's deadline, leaving testing and innumerable details incomplete and the boat roughly 200 per cent over its projected budget. On 31 October 1968, the last day possible to begin the race, Teignmouth Electron was towed from Teignmouth Harbour and sailed into the Atlantic.

The Electron was designed to be very sparse, with a sizable reduction of living space that was intentionally designed to reduce weight, wind and water resistance. The original designs called for a high enclosed wheelhouse superstructure that Crowhurst abandoned for a flush deck that only allowed for a small rounded “doghouse”.

== Onboard and exterior equipment ==
The Electron's sail configuration consisted of No. 1 mainsail, No. 1 mizzen sail, working staysail, and working jib. On the exterior deck were an inflatable raft, a rubber dingy, an anchor mounted on the starboard bow of the deck, and a stainless tube pulpit mounted to the bow of the boat. The boat also housed a Hasler self-steering system with a wind vane and servo blade as well as a Hengist-Horsa wind speed and direction indicator.

Below deck the accommodation consisted of a built-in writing and eating table with a small red cushioned seat that would have hidden the ‘main computer’ but instead obscured a tangle of carefully colour-coded, but unconnected, wires that hung throughout the cabin. On the starboard side was a built-in chart table with a vise mounted to it. On the port side mid-stay, was a small galley (kitchen) with a stainless sink basin and small tap with water supplied by an internally mounted water tank. Wood cabinets were above the sink and cooking burner. Aft was the small single berth. Overall, the living quarters were considerably smaller than those of Crowhurst's competition.

For communication, Crowhurst had a Marconi Kestrel radio-telephone, a Racal RA 6217 communications receiver, a Shannon Mar 3 transmitter/receiver, headsets, Morse keys, switch panels, and gross amounts of radio spares. Powering the electronics on the boat was an Onan petrol-driven generator that was seated under the cockpit where it would be at risk of continuous exposure to water in rough weather. The galley consisted of a small burner, a pot and sink with freshwater supplied from eight Plysu containers holding part of his water supply which were connected to four large fixed water tanks, mounted inside the port and starboard side floats. The typical “Victress” cabin also featured built-in cabinetry; Crowhurst allowed a few units of shelving in the galley, but replaced most of it with lightweight Tupperware plastic containers for storing food, electronic components and a second-hand Bell and Howell 16 mm camera and Uher tape recorder that had been provided by the BBC for documenting the journey. Crowhurst brought aboard only five books: Albert Einstein’s Relativity, the Special and the General Theory; Shanties from the Seven Seas; Servomechanisms; The Gypsy Moth Circles the World; and Mathematics of Engineering Systems.

For provisions, Crowhurst had dried vegetables, powdered milk, tea, porridge, butter, powdered eggs, bread, jam, champagne, mustard, a few tins of beer, rum, barley wine and various tinned or dehydrated meals.

== Sailing history ==
The attempted launch of Teignmouth Electron took place on 23 September into the river at Brundall when Crowhurst's wife, Clare, tried to christen the vessel by breaking a bottle of champagne against the boat's hull. However, the bottle didn't shatter and instead bounced off the hull, which prompted John Eastwood to take the bottle and properly break it against the boat, completing the launch.

The Electron was tested in open water from Brundall, down the River Yare, and then by sea to Teignmouth. The voyage was meant to be completed in three days, but instead took two weeks. On this voyage, due to an abrupt halt commanded by Crowhurst to avoid a chain ferry, the Electron was swung into the river bank by the tide and her starboard float was holed. On this maiden journey, it was also discovered that the Electron could not perform windward, an issue Crowhurst would encounter again once the race began.

On 13 October an experienced sailor, Lieutenant Commander Peter Eden, volunteered to accompany Crowhurst on his last leg from Cowes to Teignmouth. Crowhurst had fallen into the water several times while in Cowes, and as he and Eden climbed aboard Teignmouth Electron, he once again ended up in the water after slipping on the outboard bracket on the stern of the rubber dinghy. Eden's description of his two days with Crowhurst provides the most expert independent assessment available for both boat and sailor before the start of the race. He recalls that the trimaran sailed immensely swiftly, but could get no closer to the wind than 60 degrees. The speed often reached 12 knots, but the vibrations encountered caused the screws on the Hasler self-steering gear to come loose. Eden said, "We had to keep leaning over the counter to do up the screws. It was a tricky and time consuming business. I told Crowhurst he should get the fixings welded if he wanted it to survive a longer trip!" Eden also commented that the Hasler worked superbly and the boat was "certainly nippy." Eden reported that Crowhurst's sailing techniques were good, "But I felt his navigation was a mite slapdash. I prefer, even in the Channel, to know exactly where I am. He didn't take too much bother with it, merely jotting down figures on a few sheets of paper from time to time." After struggling against westerlies and having to tack out into the Channel twice, they arrived at 2.30 pm on 15 October, where an enthusiastic BBC film crew started filming Eden in the belief he was Crowhurst. There were 16 days to get ready before the race's deadline on 31 October. ("The strange voyage of Donald Crowhurst." by Ron Hall and Nicholas Tomalin.)

The Electron set sail from Teignmouth Harbour at 4:52 pm on 31 October 1968. Based on his logs, it is believed Crowhurst's voyage lasted in total 243 days; his last log entry is dated 24 June 1969. The Electron was at sea for a total of 252 days before being found ghosting, adrift a shipping lane.

Upon starting the race the boat immediately experienced problems. Three days into the journey, the Hasler self-steering gear shed two screws, which led Crowhurst to discover that he had no spare screws or bolts aboard the craft. He salvaged screws off of non-necessary gear but any more shedding would result in loss of control of the craft while Crowhurst was not at the helm. His logline, which judged distance travelled, was also caught on the boat's rudder and the rotator jammed. His Racal radio receiver also did not transmit, a problem Crowhurst struggled with for four days before realizing it had just been a blown fuse. On 5 November, he discovered that the port bow float and tack were taking on water, and the whole compartment had been flooded up to the deck.

As he attempted to bail the water, the 15-foot seas came pouring back into the opening. On Wednesday, 13 November, a leak in the cockpit hatch flooded the engine compartment and his Onan generator. Design flaws made the Electron difficult to steer, resulting in a bizarre and erratic zigzag sailing pattern. On 15 November, in the face of extreme problems with the craft, Crowhurst set about calculating the pros and cons of continuing the race. Eventually, he came to the conclusion that dropping out would only be a temporary failure, one that could be mended with an additional try at the Golden Globe in the future. On 16 November, with his generator finally repaired, he sent off a press report to his press coordinator Rodney Hallworth, stating that he was “going towards Madeira” even though he was less than 200 miles from his last position which had been recorded as “heading Azores”. However, Crowhurst's logs prove to be fairly correct in providing location up to 1 December. It is on Friday, 6 December that he begins to actively construct a false navigational record, giving himself up to 243 miles per day runs in a communication to Hallworth on the 10th. In some cases, his fabricated mileage is almost triple his actual achieved distance.

On 21 December, Crowhurst reported, “split skin of starboard float.” The internal wooden frames had come away from the plywood, leaving a split half-way along the float. He attributes the hole to the workmanship of the Eastwood shipyard, as it had formed in the fibreglass that they had laid on the floats. This split grew the longer Crowhurst neglected to attend to it, and as he had no means of repairing such a sizable hole on board, he would have to stop for the needed supplies. For nearly a month he meandered on the coast of South America, weighing his options.

On 6 March 1969, he dropped anchor at Rio Salado, landing in Argentina at 8:30 am in order to repair the sizeable hole, and grounded himself in the quickly receding tides. He stayed for two days and set sail again on 8 March.

Shortly after midnight on 21 May, Lieutenant-Commander Nigel Tetley, the only other competitor still in competition with Crowhurst, watched as his “Victress” trimaran sank while awaiting rescue on his rubber life-raft 1,200 miles from England. After providing false readings to the race organizers for months, Crowhurst reached a point in his calculations where his true position could coincide with his fake position in the race, and at this point could safely radio the race organizers. Here, Crowhurst was informed that most of the other sailors had either dropped out of the race or that their boats had fallen apart mid-course, leaving Teignmouth Electron in position to not just finish, but actually, win the race. It is believed that Crowhurst had up to this point anticipated finishing the race, but not to win it, thus avoiding the scrutiny that would likely occur for the winner. Upon hearing the news about Tetley, Crowhurst's psychology changed more radically.

== Final days ==
On 23 June, he entered his last sun-sight in his logbook and entered no more navigational data at any point afterward. In the hours before what would become his final mental collapse, he repeatedly tried to reach his wife Clare on the telephone, but was foiled by failing equipment. On 24 June, Crowhurst began writing a 25,000-word manifesto on life, escape, time-space, and defeating time to change from “first order differentials” to “second order differentials” – at times lucid, at other moments, especially to the end, cryptic and incoherent.

His last log entry is dated 24 June 1969; the final radio transmission was made on 29 June 1969. On 1 July at 10:29 am British Standard Time, Crowhurst documented his final confession, ending with “It is finished—it is finished IT IS THE MERCY” at 11:20 and 40 seconds. He wrote “It has been a good game that must be ended at the // I will play this game when I choose I will resign the game // There is no reason for harmful”. It is presumed that shortly after this, Crowhurst, his chronometer, and falsified logbook all went overboard while the Electron was set to continue sailing at roughly two knots.

The abandoned craft was found at 7:50 am on 10 July 1969, by Royal Mail Ship Picardy captained by Richard Box at latitude 33° 11’ North, longitude 40° 28’ West, about 1,800 miles from England. This was very close to where the famous ghost ship Mary Celeste had been found almost a hundred years before off the coast of the Azores. As designated by maritime tradition, three foghorn blasts were given by the Picardy, and when no response by flare, flag or horn was returned, a team of sailors boarded the trimaran to find it unkempt and bearing signs of life, work and cooking, but nothing overtly suspicious.

What was clear was that the craft was devoid of life and had obviously been abandoned many days before. Placed in plain view were detailed logbooks outlining forged coordinates, a logbook outlining his true coordinates, as well as the 25,000-word manifesto that he believed to be his ultimate life's work detailing “instructions” written directly to humankind on attaining transcendence. After the analysis of the logbooks, it was determined that the boat had been abandoned nine days prior to its discovery.

== Aftermath ==
After its discovery by RMS Picardy, Teignmouth Electron was offloaded at Santo Domingo in the Dominican Republic and then taken for assessment to the Receiver of Wrecks in Jamaica. The Electron's British funder, wanting to recoup some of his financial investment but also put aside the tragic and embarrassing event, sold the boat in auction sight unseen. In Jamaica, the boat was purchased by Kingston hotelier and businessman (and ex-choreographer from New York) Larry Wirth, who used it as a private pleasure craft until 1973, when it was sold to Roderick "Bunny" Francis, a young entrepreneur with a fledgling trawling company. Francis made significant alterations to the boat to alleviate the austere conditions Crowhurst had demanded within the living quarters, and to make the boat less difficult to manoeuvre and sail.

To transition the boat into a leisure craft, Francis had Crowhurst's streamlined doghouse opened up and built taller, and added much larger windows. With this, the main cabin was redesigned so it could sleep up to 10 people. Francis also modified the stern significantly; removing the fin keep and adding a skeg with propeller shaft for a trolling motor. Topside the stern, two seating blocks were added to provide a seating position for the helmsman. A number of the deck hatches were modified, and the circular covers were cut and made square with a more easily removable hatch. Francis then had the entire boat fibreglassed and repainted. At this point, the port of registration (Bridgwater) was painted below the name of the vessel.

Francis also made a number of changes with the purpose of correcting and smoothing the erratic sailing pattern that Crowhurst experienced. He removed the daggerboards on the starboard and port side floats. He constructed a new keel on the main hull: twelve feet long, four inches wide, with a six-inch protrusion that was anchored to the main hull and fibreglassed over. During this period in Jamaica, the boat mostly stayed moored and was sailed for short pleasure cruises in Montego Bay.

Due to the difficult economic climate in Jamaica in the 1970s, Francis sold the boat in 1975 for $12,000 to George McDermot who kept and sailed the boat out of what is now Morgan's Harbour. In 1977 George McDermot was moving his family to Miami and sold the boat to his brother Winston McDermot. After a short while, Winston moved his scuba diving operation, and with it Teignmouth Electron to Cayman Brac, a smaller sister island about 160 km to the east of Grand Cayman. The boat remained in service as a diving boat until 1983, when it hit bottom and sustained minor damage. To repair the damage the boat was hauled out onto the beach for repairs. Unfortunately while being lifted with a crane it dropped and sustained further damage to the hull. Aware of the boat's history, McDermot had eventual intentions to repair and even restore her closer to Crowhurst's original design, and commenced by removing the huge cabin and began constructing a smaller one; during the start of the restoration, he came across a supply of Crowhurst's emergency rations, secreted in a sealed compartment on the underside of the arm between the main hull and port float (three more such compartments remained unopened). Unfortunately, due to the attention required by other aspects of his business, the full restoration did not materialise; the vessel was subsequently damaged by Hurricane Gilbert during September 1988 and plans for its restoration abandoned.

Over the years, various elements have been removed, including the aluminium mast and rigging and most of the parts of value including the metal fittings and tie-downs, leaving a mostly empty hull. In 1998, the hull was essentially intact, but since then the remains of the vessel have continued to deteriorate. Well past the point of preservation, in 2007, McDermot sold the boat to American artist Michael Jones McKean, who planned to create a full-sized replica of the boat in its dilapidated state as an artistic piece. In 2017, McKean led a group of researchers and archaeologists to Cayman Brac to produce an archival quality, high-resolution digital scan of what remained of the Electron and the surrounding site (see "External links"). By 2018 the boat's name plates had been removed and the words "Dream Boat" were sprayed on the transom.

What remains of the boat has exerted a fascination and poignancy for viewers and a small number of visitors over the years, on account of its association with the initial optimism and eventual tragic demise of its designer and original sailor, Donald Crowhurst. McKean, who is the latest owner of the remains, wrote in 2007 that the boat "stands in relation to a desperate belief in something bigger than any of us individually. We have these feelings that are embedded deep inside our coding as people, to hope and dream and aspire to great, impossible things. But these dreams, in there [their] hugeness have the potential to unravel us. They move us to action, but in their grandiose scale become impossible to understand; they seduce us but have the possibility [to] finish us. For me the boat lives on as a relic, or monument to this idea."

== Replica ==
In 2015, Heritage Marine in England began construction of an elaborate, full-scale replica of Teignmouth Electron. By piecing together photos, as well as original diagrams, an extremely detailed reconstruction was achieved. The build was funded by StudioCanal and the BBC for a film depiction of the Crowhurst/Electron saga titled The Mercy, starring Colin Firth and released in February 2018. The replica is now owned by Michael Jones McKean and is currently in dry-docked storage on the island of Malta.

Another recreation of the main interior cabin was made for the 2006 documentary Deep Water. This replica no longer exists.

== Gallery ==
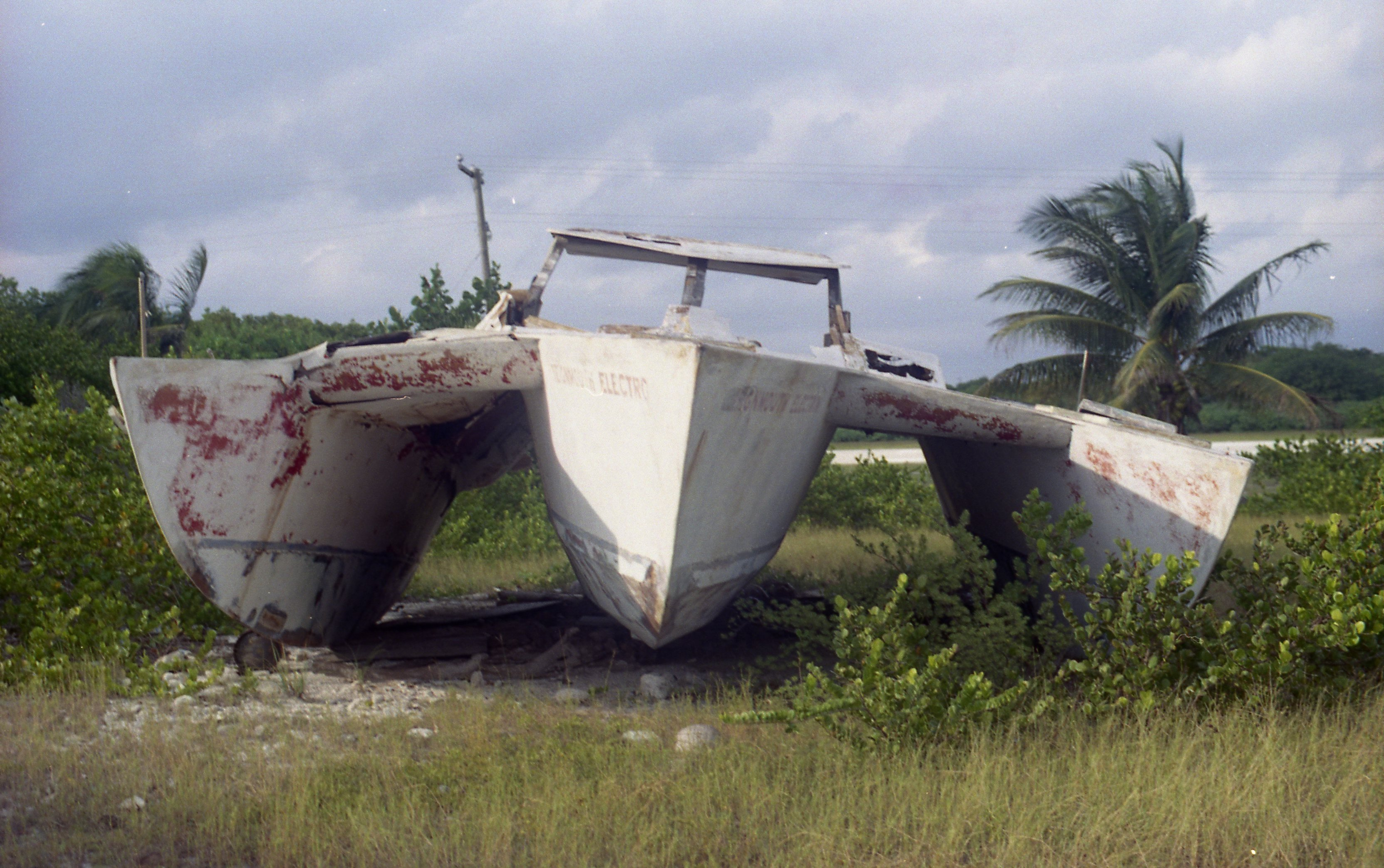
Teignmouth Electron (boat), remains at Cayman Brac, by Packmatt, 2001

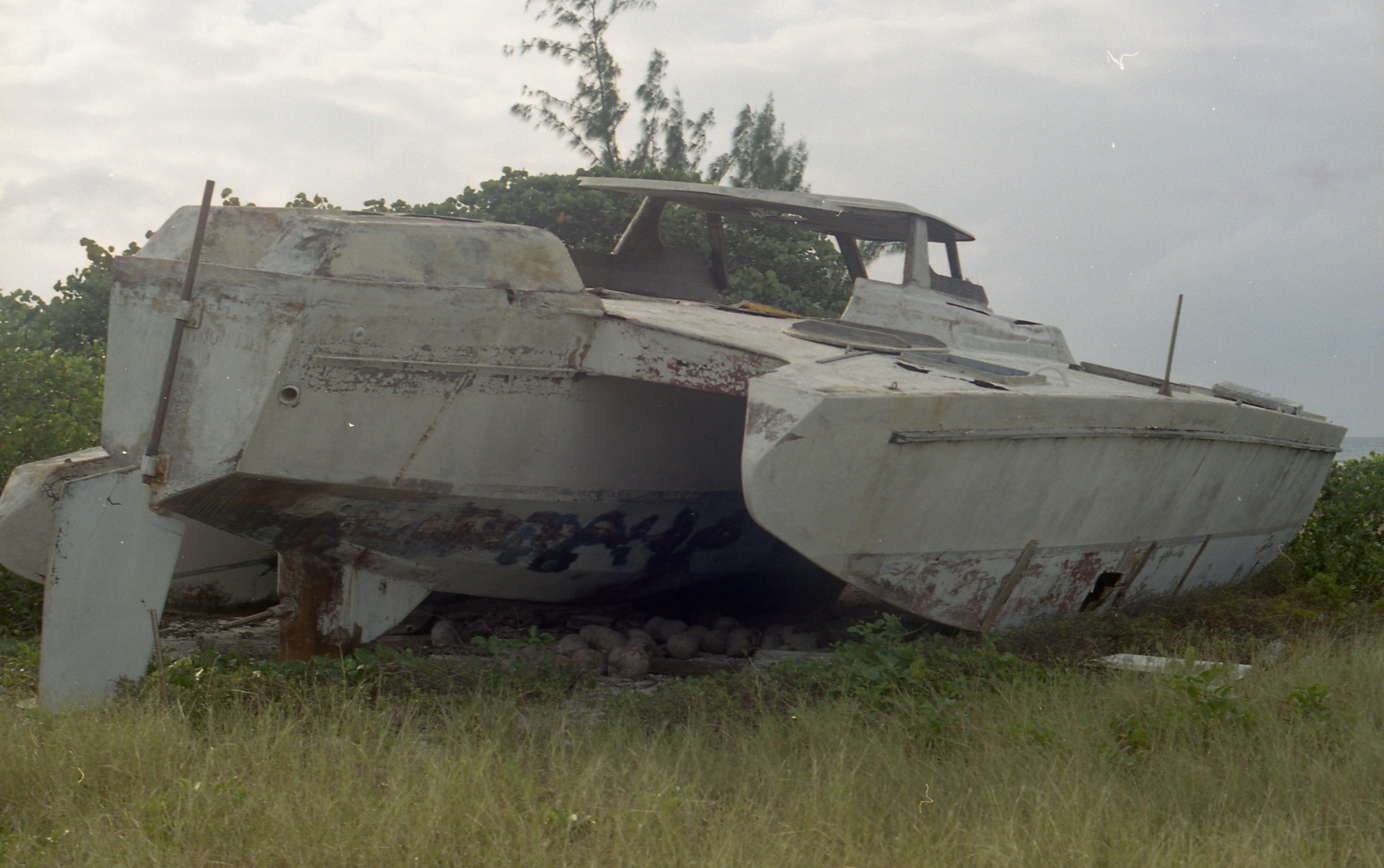
Teignmouth Electron (boat), remains at Cayman Brac, by Packmatt, 2001

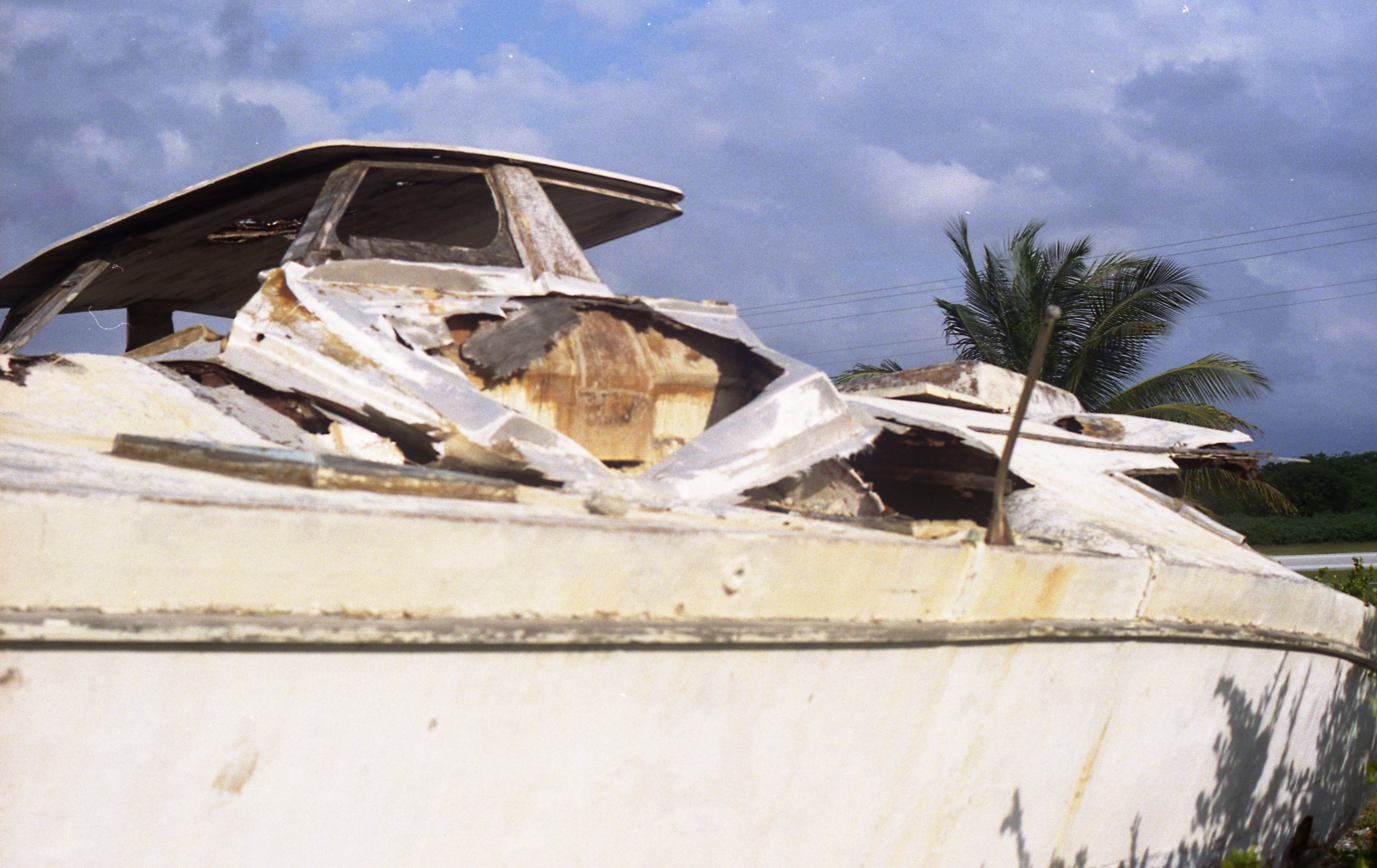
Teignmouth Electron (boat), remains at Cayman Brac, by Packmatt, 2001

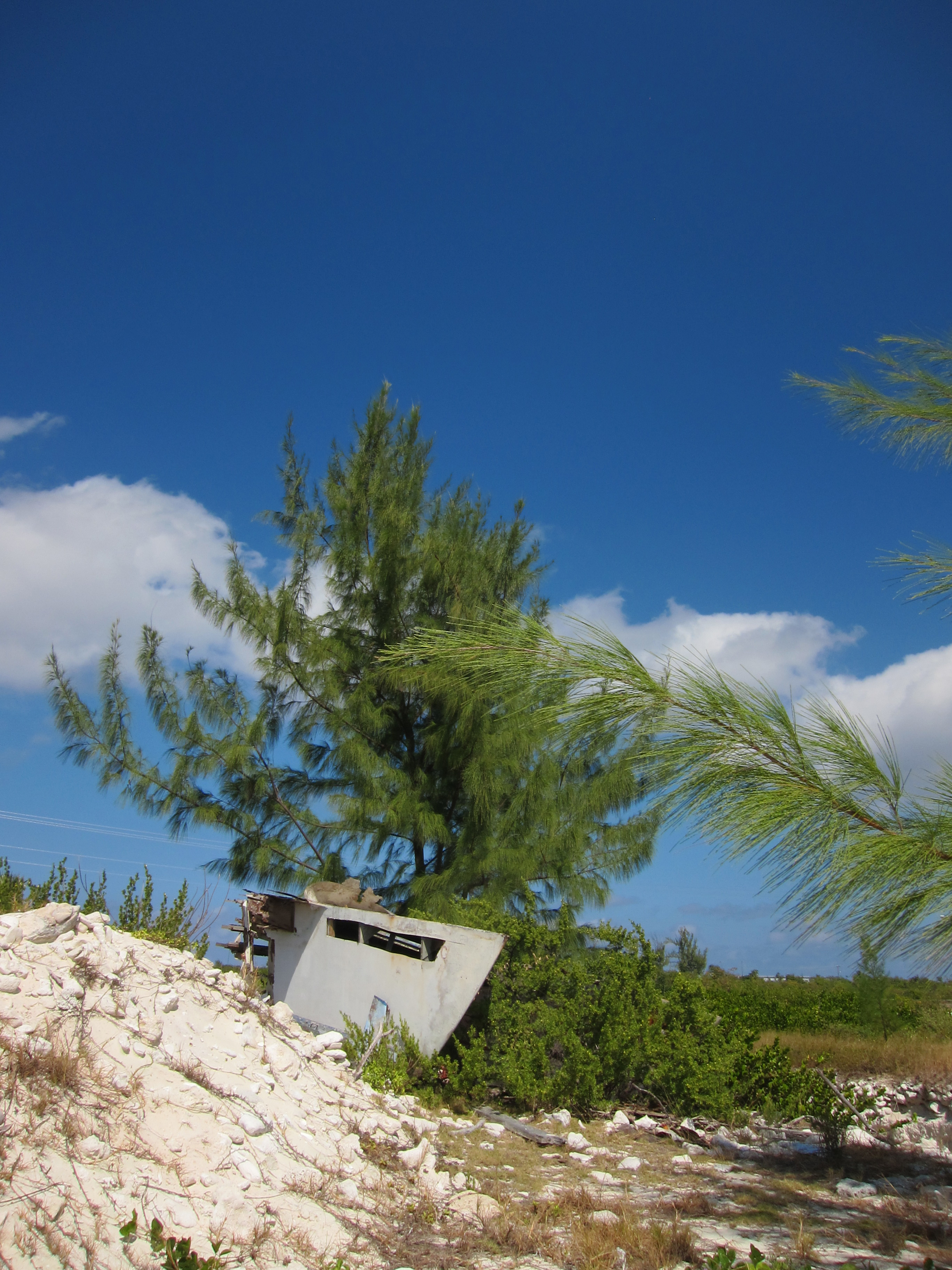
Teignmouth Electron (boat), remains at Cayman Brac, by Lee Shoal, 2011

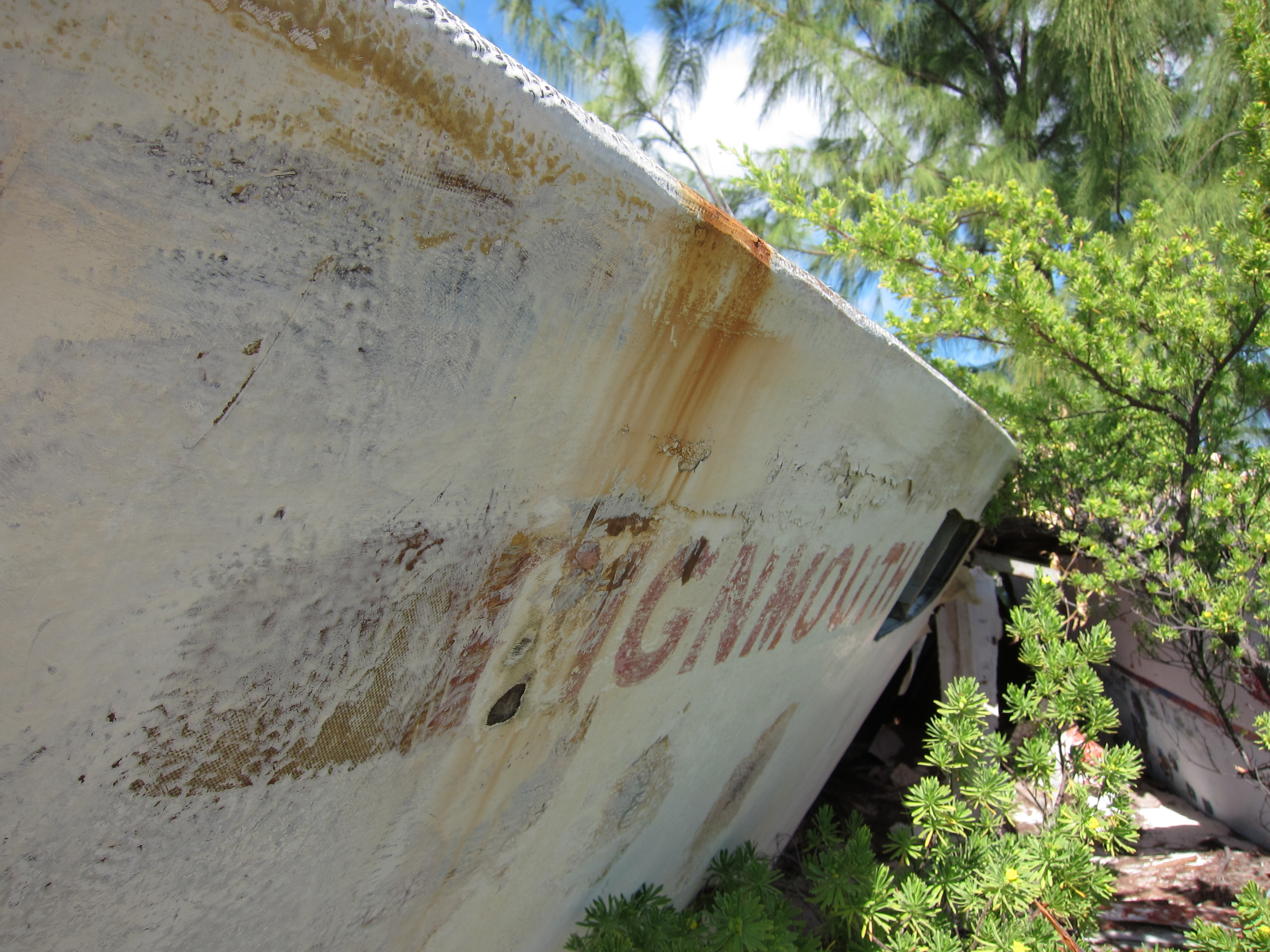
Teignmouth Electron (boat), remains at Cayman Brac, by Lee Shoal, 2011

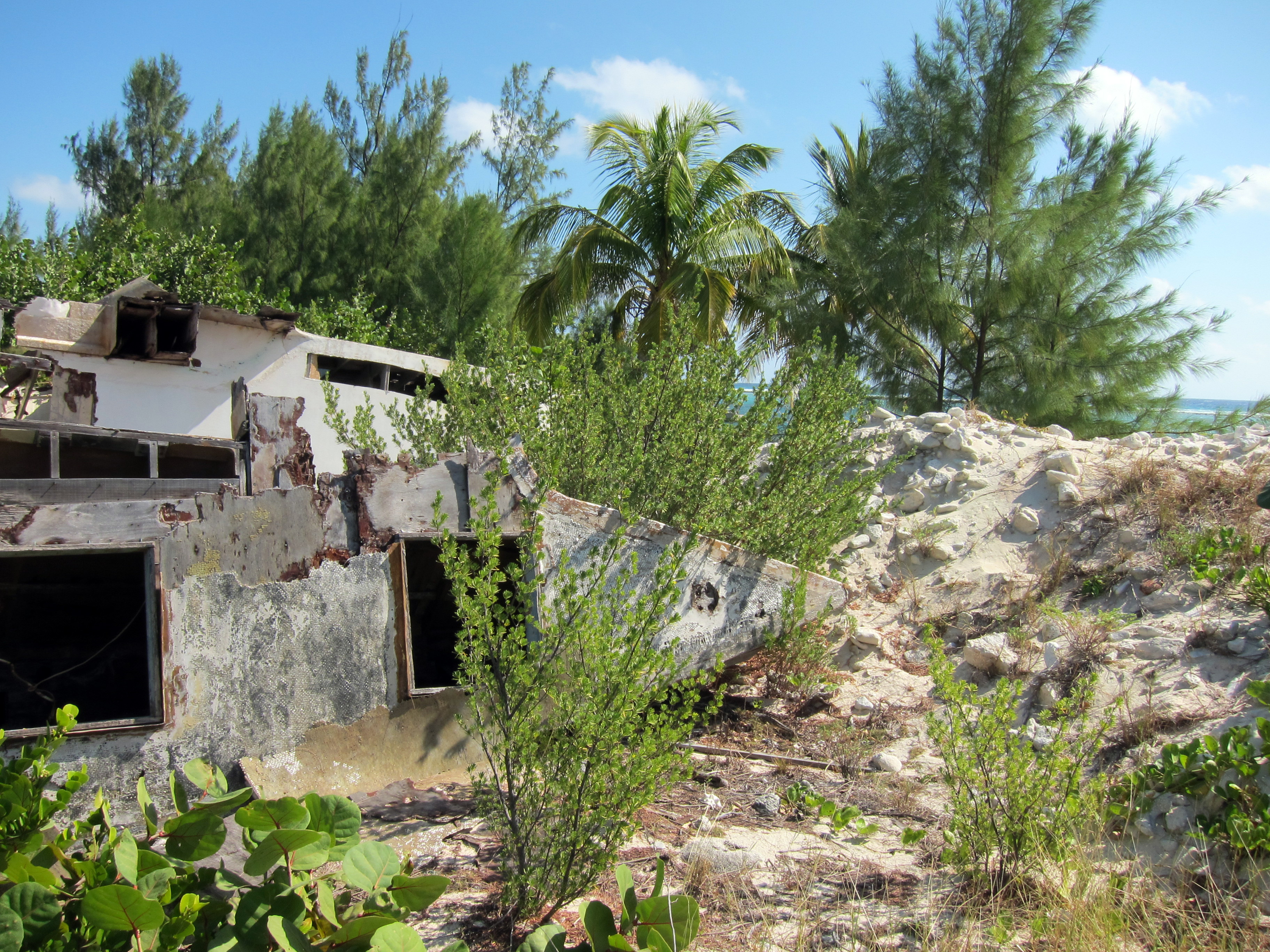
Teignmouth Electron (boat), remains at Cayman Brac, by Lee Shoal, 2011

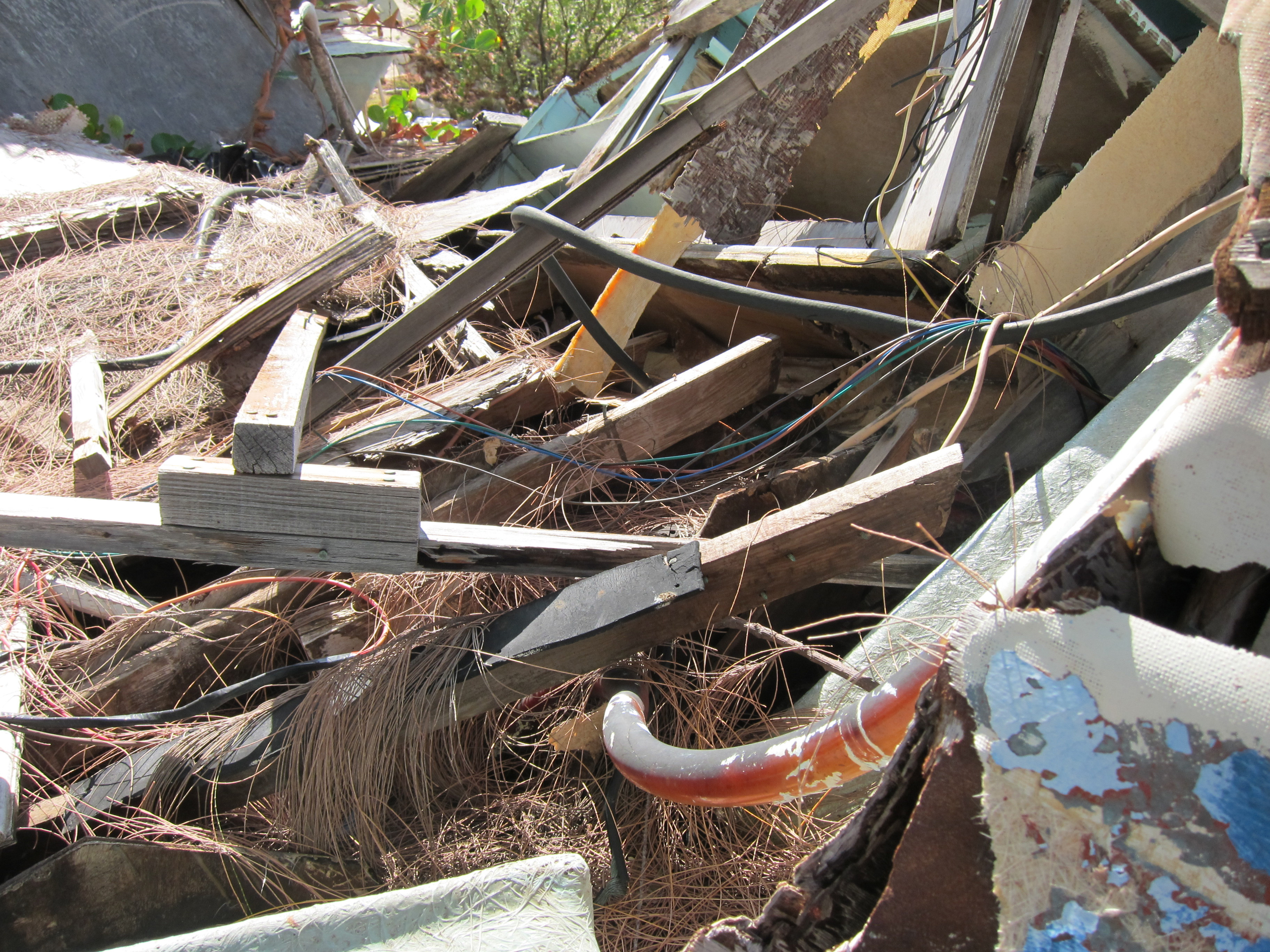
Teignmouth Electron (boat), remains at Cayman Brac, by Lee Shoal, 2011

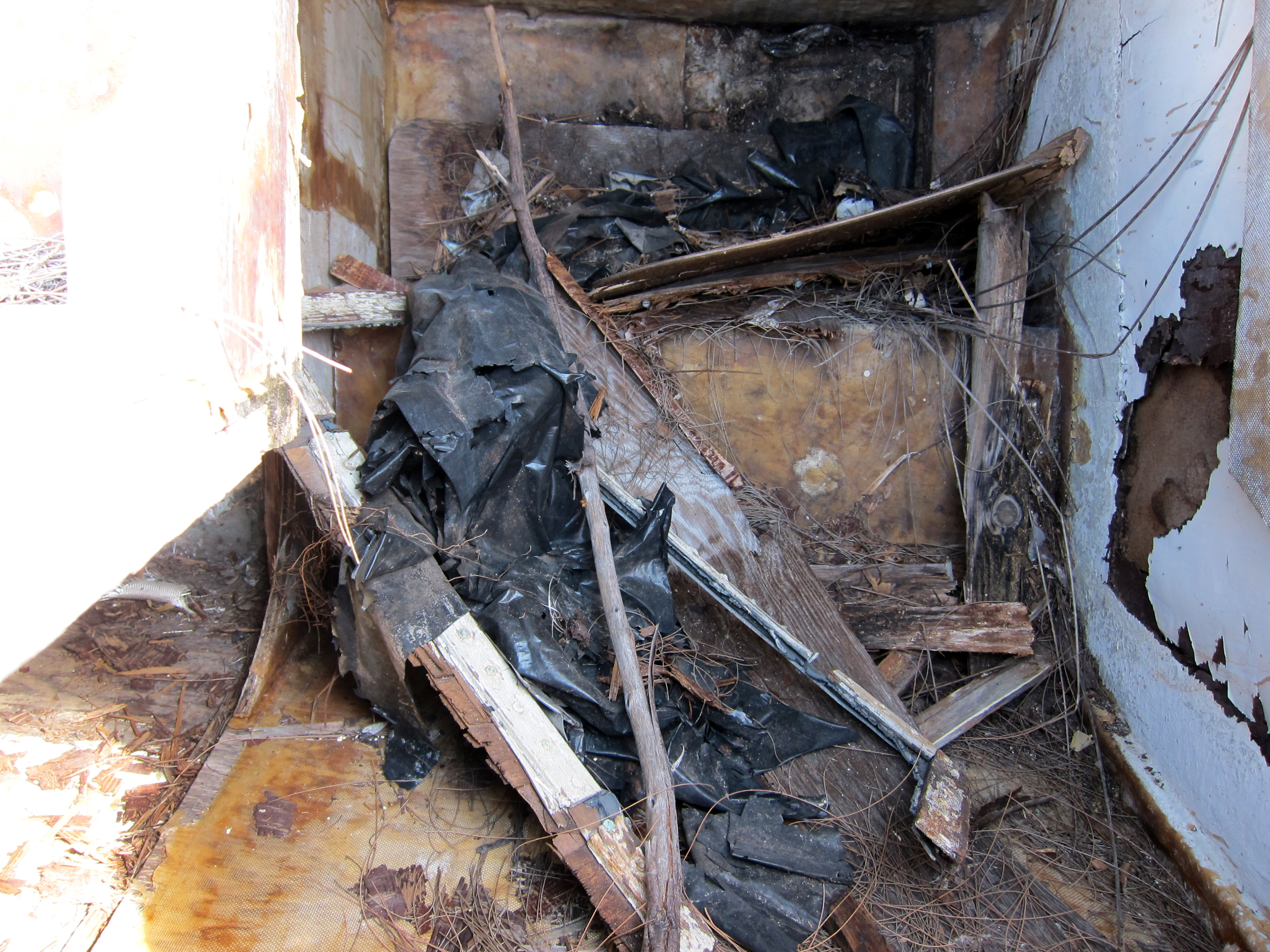
Teignmouth Electron (boat), remains at Cayman Brac, by Lee Shoal, 2011

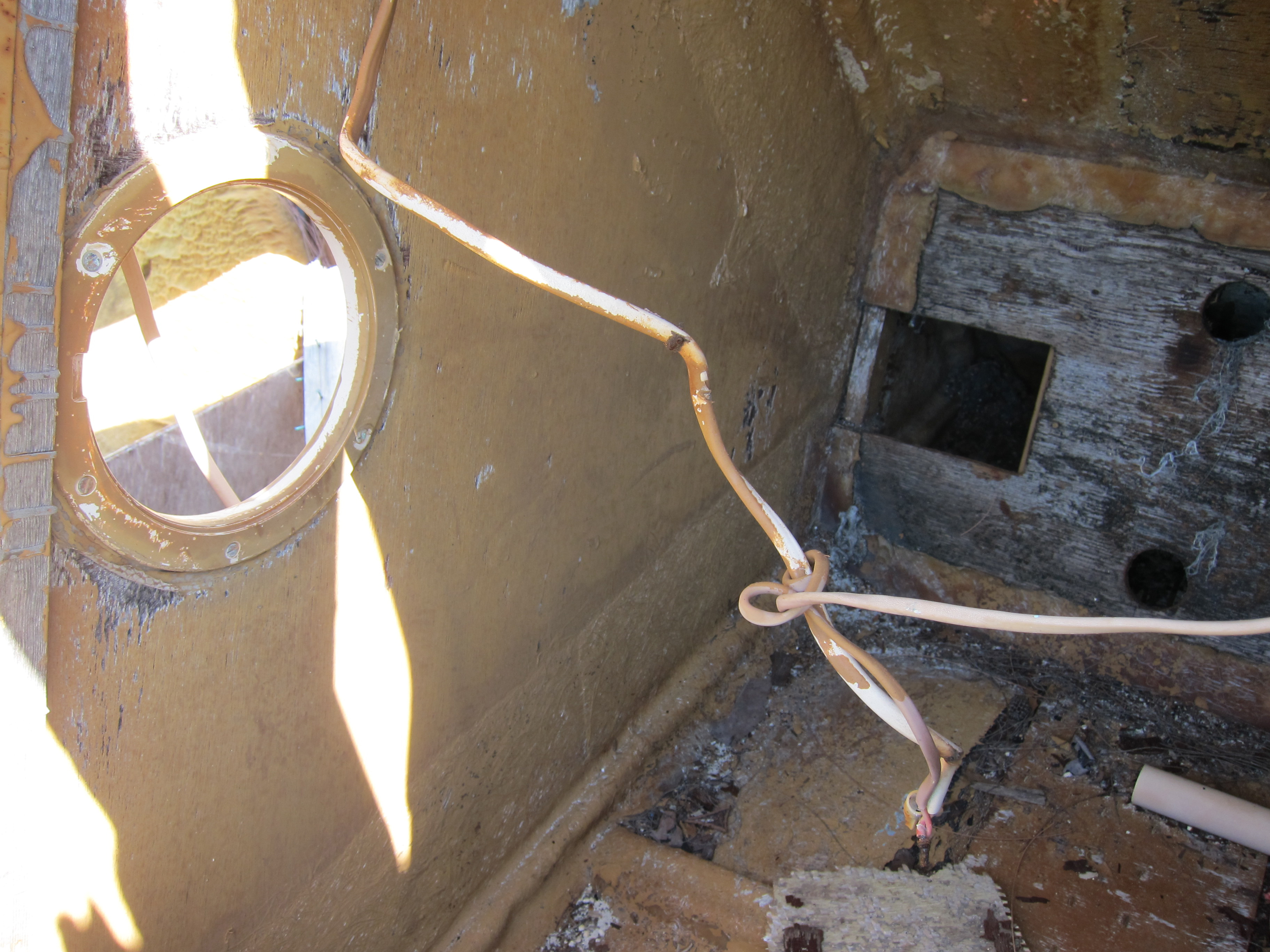
Teignmouth Electron (boat), remains at Cayman Brac, by Lee Shoal, 2011

== Bibliography ==
- Nicholas Tomalin and Ron Hall, 1970: "The Strange Voyage of Donald Crowhurst". Hodder & Stoughton, 317 pp. ISBN 9780340129203 (Subsequent editions have the revised title "The Strange Last Voyage of Donald Crowhurst").
- Tacita Dean, 1999: "Teignmouth Electron". Book Works in association with the National Maritime Museum, 72 pp. ISBN 9781870699365
- Chris Eakin, 2009: "A Race Too Far". Random House, 336 pp.
