= Crowhurst (film) =

- Theatrical release poster
- Directed by: Simon Rumley
- Written by: Andy Briggs
- Produced by: Michael Riley
- Starring: Justin Salinger
- Cinematography: Milton Kam
- Edited by: Agnieszka Liggett
- Music by: Richard Chester
- Production company: Sterling Pictures
- Distributed by: StudioCanal
- Release date: 15 September 2017 (Oldenburg Film Festival)
- Running time: 99 minutes
- Country: United Kingdom
- Language: English

Crowhurst is a 2017 British drama film directed by Simon Rumley, based on the true story of sailor Donald Crowhurst. Filming for the movie took place in Bristol during 2015 and the movie premiered on 15 September 2017 at the Oldenburg International Film Festival.

== Plot ==
In October 1968, Donald Crowhurst, a 35-year-old engineer and father of four, embarked on one of the last great adventures of the 20th century. He was one of nine men who set out from the English coast that autumn as part of the Sunday Times Golden Globe Race, chasing to be either the first or the fastest man to circumnavigate the globe – single-handed and non-stop. But for Donald the dream turned into a nightmare.

== Cast ==
- Justin Salinger as Donald Crowhurst
- Amy Loughton as Clare Crowhurst
- Edwin Flay as Peter Porter
- Glyn Dilley as Stanley Best
- Christopher Hale as Rodney Hallworth

== Reception ==
On review aggregator website Rotten Tomatoes, the film holds an approval rating of 78% based on 9 reviews, and an average rating of 6.3/10.

The Hollywood Reporter reviewed Crowhurst, stating that it was "an intriguing curio, for sure, but a minor addition to Rumley’s mind-bending canon." Kim Newman reviewed the movie for Screen International, praising Justin Salinger's portrayal of Crowhurst.

== See also ==
- The Mercy – 2017 film on the same subject directed by James Marsh and also distributed by Studio Canal
- Deep Water – 2006 documentary on the subject
