= John Smithson =

British film and television producer

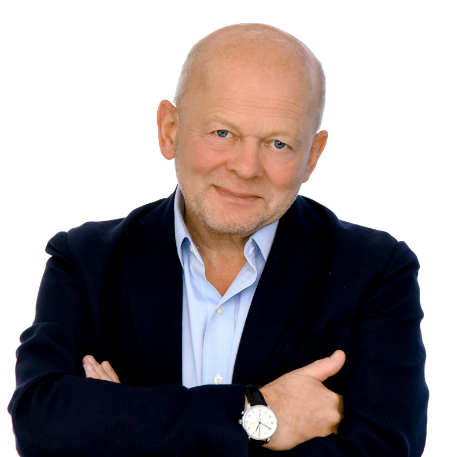
Smithson in 2020

John Smithson (born in March 1952) is an Oscar Best Picture nominee and BAFTA, Emmy, Peabody, and Grierson award-winning producer and executive in non-scripted film and television based in London, England.

His most notable works include originating and producing the Oscar and BAFTA-nominated film 127 Hours, the BAFTA-winning landmark documentary Touching the Void, as well as the BAFTA and London Film Festival-winning documentary Sherpa.

== Career ==
Smithson began his career as a reporter for Manchester's Piccadilly Radio before joining BBC Radio 4 as a current affairs producer. He then entered the television industry, spending five years as a researcher on Granada’s World in Action, followed by two years producing Rough Justice for BBC TV.

He co-founded Darlow Smithson Productions in 1988 and led its growth into one of the world’s foremost non-fiction producers and a trailblazer for UK expansion into the US factual market, producing over 100 hours of high-quality programmes every year for world-leading broadcasters, including Discovery, C4, BBC, and National Geographic.

Smithson acquired full control of Darlow Smithson Productions in June 2002, buying out co-founder David Darlow’s 50% stake. The company was acquired by sports and media giant IMG in 2006 and later by Endemol in 2009.

In 2011, Smithson co-founded Arrow Media, one of the UK’s fastest-growing production companies, which rapidly became a creative powerhouse delivering more than 100 hours of world-class TV to the UK, US and international markets each year. In 2023, Arrow Media was acquired by French media group Asacha, which has since become part of Fremantle (company).

Since his departure from Arrow Media, Smithson worked independently before founding his own production company, Smithson Media, in 2025 to focus on a slate of ambitious projects, while acting as a key creative and strategic advisor in content creation and management.

== Awards & nominations ==
Year	Award	Category	Production	Result
1999	News & Documentary Emmy Award	Analysis of a Single Current Story	Decoding the Nazis	Won
2004	BAFTA Alexander Korda Award	Best British Film	Touching the Void	Won
2004	British Independent Film Award	Best British Documentary	Touching the Void	Won
2004	Evening Standard British Film Award	Best Film Award	Touching the Void	Won
2005	Emmy	Outstanding Animated Program (For Programming One Hour or More)	The Last Dragon	Nominated
2005	Online Film & Television Association	Best Documentary Award	Touching the Void	Nominated
2007	BAFTA Award	Flaherty Documentary Award	9/11: The Falling Man	Nominated
2007	New York Festival World Gold Medal	Feature-Length Documentary	9/11: The Falling Man	Won
2007	Grierson Awards	Best Cinema Documentary	Deep Water	Won
2007	Focal Award	Best Use of Footage in a Feature Length Documentary or Film	Deep Water	Won
2007	San Diego Film Critics Society Award	Best Documentary	Deep Water	Won
2007	Rome International Film Festival Award	Best Cinema Documentary	Deep Water	Won
2008	International Emmy Award	Best Documentary	The Beckoning Silence	Won
2009	BAFTA TV Award	Best Single Documentary	The Beckoning Silence	Nominated
2009	BAFTA TV Award	Best Single Documentary	Thrilla in Manila	Nominated
2009	Sundance Film Festival	Grand Jury Prize	Thrilla in Manila	Nominated
2009	Banff Television Festival Award	Best Sports Documentary	Thrilla in Manila	Won
2009	Grierson Award	Best Historical Documentary	Thrilla in Manila	Won
2010	Peabody Award		Thrilla in Manila	Won
2010	News & Documentary Emmy Award	Outstanding Historical Programming	Thrilla in Manila	Nominated
2010	International Emmy Award	Best Documentary	9/11: Phone Calls from the Towers	Nominated
2011	Academy Awards (Oscar)	Best Motion Picture of the Year	127 Hours	Nominated
2011	BAFTA Alexander Korda Award	Best British Film	127 Hours	Nominated
2011	American Film Institute (AFI) Awards	Movie of the Year	127 Hours	Won
2011	News & Documentary Emmy Award	Outstanding Historical Programming	Into the Universe with Stephen Hawking, episode "Time Travel"	Nominated
2012	News & Documentary Emmy Award	Outstanding Informational Programming - Long Form	9/11: Heroes of the 88th Floor: People Helping People	Nominated
2012	Emmy	Outstanding Science and Technology Programming	Curiosity, episode "Did God Create the Universe"	Nominated
2015	Australian Academy of Cinema and Television Arts Award	Best Feature Length Documentary	Sherpa	Nominated
2015	London Film Festival Grierson Award	Best Documentary Film	Sherpa	Won
2016	Film Critics Australia Award	Best Feature Length Documentary	Sherpa	Won
2016	BAFTA Film Awards	Best Documentary Award	Sherpa	Nominated
2022	Australian Academy of Cinema and Television Arts	Best Documentary	River	Won
2022	Grierson Awards	Best Science Documentary	Positive	Nominated
2025	Telluride Mountainfilm Festival	James Balog Creative Vision Award	Cecil	Won

== Notable Work ==
- Touching the Void — 2003 (Producer)
- Deep Water — 2006 (Producer)
- 9/11: The Falling Man — 2006 (Executive Producer)
- Thrilla in Manila — 2008 (Executive Producer)
- 127 Hours — 2010 (Producer)
- Sherpa — 2015 (Producer)

== Complete Filmography ==
Title	Format	Year of Release	Role
World In Action	TV series	1981-1985	Researcher (multiple episodes)
Rough Justice	TV Series	1987	Producer (3 episodes)
Coded Hostile (aka Tailspin: Behind the Korean Airliner Tragedy)	TV Movie	1989	Producer
Dead Ahead: The Exxon Valdez Disaster	TV Movie	1992	Producer
Everyman	TV Series	1993-1994	Producer (3 episodes)
Children of God	TV Movie	1994	Director | Producer
What Has Become of Us	TV Mini Series	1994	Executive Producer (3 episodes)
Witness	TV Series	1994-1997	Executive Producer / Producer (4 episodes)
The Affair	TV Movie	1995	Producer
Black Box	TV Series	1996-1998	Executive Producer (6 episodes)
Crash	TV Series	1998	Executive Producer (3 episodes)
Driven	TV Series	1998	Executive Producer (30 episodes)
Blaze	TV Series	1999	Executive Producer (3 hours)
Bootcamp	Documentary	1999	Executive Producer
Mayday	TV Series	1999	Executive Producer (4 episodes)
Station X	TV Mini Series	1999	Executive Producer (6 episodes)
Derail	TV Series	2000	Executive Producer (3 episodes)
Secret Agent	TV Series	2000	Producer (4 episodes)
Teenage Japanese Killers	TV Movie	2000	Executive Producer
Why Doctors Make Mistakes	TV Series	2000	Executive Producer (3 episodes)
Murder in Paradise	TV Series	2001	Executive Producer (1 episode)
Why Men Leave	Documentary	2001	Executive Producer
Lost Girls	TV Series	2002	Executive Producer (2 episodes)
Lost Worlds	TV Series	2002	Executive Producer (1 episode)
The Hollywood Machine	TV Series	2002	Executive Producer (3 hours)
What Killed the Mega Beasts	TV Movie	2002	Executive Producer
Touching the Void	Theatrical Documentary	2003	Producer
We Built This City: London	TV Movie	2003	Executive Producer
We Built This City: New York	TV Movie	2003	Executive Producer
The Last Dragon	TV Movie	2004	Executive Producer
E=mc²	TV Movie	2005	Executive Producer
I Shouldn’t Be Alive	TV Series	2005-2011	Executive Producer (30 episodes)
The Somme	TV Movie	2005	Executive Producer
Deep Water	Theatrical Documentary	2006	Producer
The Da Vinci Detective	TV Movie	2006	Executive Producer
9/11: The Falling Man	Feature Documentary	2006	Executive Producer
Clapham Junction	TV Movie	2007	Executive Producer
Impact Earth	TV Movie	2007	Executive Producer
The Beckoning Silence	Feature Documentary	2007	Executive Producer
Thrilla in Manila	Feature Documentary	2008	Executive Producer
We Built This City: Paris	TV Movie	2008	Executive Producer
The Diary of Anne Frank	TV Mini Series	2009	Executive Producer (5 episodes)
U Be Dead	TV Movie	2009	Executive Producer
9/11: Phone Calls from the Towers	TV Movie	2009	Executive Producer
Stephen Hawking’s Universe	TV Mini Series	2010	Executive Producer (3 episodes)
Atlas 4D	TV Series	2010	Executive Producer (3 episodes)
127 Hours	Feature Film	2010	Producer
9/11: Heroes of the 88th Floor: People Helping People	TV Movie	2011	Executive Producer
Stephen Hawking’s Grand Design	TV Mini Series	2012	Executive Producer (3 episodes)
Ultimate Airport Dubai	TV Series	2013-2015	Executive Producer (19 episodes) | Creative Director (30 episodes)
Dogs: Their Secret Lives	TV Series	2014	Executive Producer (4 episodes)
Mayday: The Passenger Who Landed a Plane	TV Special	2014	Executive Producer
Bletchley Park: Code-Breaking's Forgotten Genius	TV Movie	2015	Creative Director
Sherpa	Theatrical Documentary	2015	Producer
Hitler: The Rise and Fall	TV Series	2016	Creative Director (6 episodes)
Taking Flight Britain’s America’s Cup Challenge	TV Series	2016	Executive Producer
Man Made Planet: Earth from Space	TV Movie	2017	Executive Producer
Modern British Slavery	Documentary	2017	Creative Director
Nightmare on Everest	TV Movie	2017	Creative Director
A Year of British Murder	TV Movie	2019	Executive Producer
Generation 9/11	TV Mini Series	2021	Creative Director (2 episodes)
River	Feature Film	2021	Producer
I Sniper	TV Mini Series	2023	Executive Producer (6 hours)
Tsunami: The Wave That Shook the World	TV Special	2024	Executive Producer
Cecil	Theatrical Documentary	2025	Producer
