= Michael Jones McKean =

American artist and educator (born 1976)

Michael Jones McKean (born 1976) is an American artist and educator.

McKean's work explores the nature of objects in relation to folklore, technology, anthropology, and mysticism. His complex installations and sculptures merge expansive but highly specific orderings of materials, processes and substances.

McKean's work engages an interest in deep time, timescales and their collapse, in the process decentering historically anthropocentric registrations of events, distances and meaning. McKean often presents seemingly incongruous objects in careful arrangement, at times quoting vernacular museological display techniques. Through his working process he questions stable definitions such as real and replica, natural and synthetic, fact and fiction, past and future by employing diverse media such as ancient meteorites, primitive textiles, obsolete technologies, raw clay, psychotropic medicines, and prismatic rainbows.

== Biography ==
McKean was born on Chuuk Island (formally Truk Island) in Micronesia in 1976. McKean's family moved to the United States in the late 1970s settling in Arden, Delaware, a village founded in 1900 as a radical Georgist single-tax community. McKean attended Marywood University on a basketball scholarship, also studying art. He later attended The New York State College of Ceramics at Alfred University receiving his MFA in 2002.

McKean in 2014

McKean has been the recipient of many awards including a Guggenheim Fellowship, a Nancy Graves Foundation Award and an Artadia Award. Additionally he has received fellowships and residencies at The Core Program at the Museum of Fine Arts, Houston, The MacDowell Colony, The International Studio and Curatorial Program in New York City, The Provincetown Fine Arts Work Center, The Bemis Center for Contemporary Arts and the Sharpe-Walentas Studio Program in New York City among others.

McKean's work has been exhibited extensively nationally and internationally. Recent exhibitions include the Center for Curatorial Studies at Bard College, Annandale-on-Hudson, NY; Institute of Contemporary Art, Boston; Parc Saint Leger Centre d'art Contemporain, Nevers, France; Horton Gallery, New York, NY; Manifestation Internatiationle d'art de Quebec Biennale, Quebec City, Canada; Gentili Apri, Berlin, Germany; The Art Foundation, Athens, Greece; Inman Gallery, Houston, TX; Parisian Laundry, Montreal, Canada; Project Gentili, Prato, Italy; Shenkar University, Tel Aviv, Israel; The Southeastern Center for Contemporary Art, Winston-Salem, NC and The Museum of Fine Arts, Houston, TX among many others.

McKean has lectured and taught widely, currently holding a professorship in the Sculpture and Extended Media Department at Virginia Commonwealth University since 2006. Mckean has been a Stephen Barstow Endowed Visiting Professor at Central Michigan University, the Myers Visiting Professor at University of Akron. Additionally McKean lectures widely, with talks at Columbia University, Yale University, New York University, Cranbrook Academy of Art, Carnegie Mellon University, University of Southern California, The Royal College of Art, Goldsmiths College, Maryland Institute College of Art, San Francisco Institute of Art among many others. McKean is also the Co-Director of ASMBLY, based in New york city.

== Artwork ==
McKean is interested in sculpture's capacities and limitations for meaning transmission. Concerning this and the narrative potential of his work, McKean states:

"I realized, perhaps counterintuitively, that a sculpture is actually missing the tools to communicate a true narrative arc, lacking the most basic elements required in storytelling: a beginning and end. Without an originating point and a totalizing conclusion, a sculpture exists as an inherently unstable device for narration, forever swirling around in medias res. This was an important realization for me, that within sculpture's genetic makeup I couldn't create the meanings contained in our most culturally popular forms: think the novel, the essay, film, TV shows, YouTube videos, theater, music. Sculpture is a strange communication outlier, almost mystical by design. Yet for me realizing this limitation created some generative conditions to not only think about the nature sculpture, but to think through the process of how one could make a sculpture."

McKean's discursive practice often involves creating projects within projects. As part of his large scale installation Riverboat Lovesongs for the Ghost Whale Regatta, presented at Grand Arts in Kansas City, McKean researched in the linkage circumnavigation and failure. McKean set out to discover the longest possible straight-line route an individual could use to circumnavigate the Earth, naming the route the Great Circuit. The route takes into consideration the literally millions of minute shifts in elevation encountered while actually traveling to ultimately arrive at the longest path around the Earth. McKean commissioned the University of Kansas Department of Geography and Cartography to help engineer an algorithm using their computer array to sift and arrange billions of geographic data points. In late spring of 2006 the route was discovered.

Writing about Mckean's work, Stacy Switzer states: "The Great Circuit is a conceptual artwork and a counterintuitive test of limits based on a hypothetical journey that may or may not be physically possible. As the catalyst for an extraordinary body of information—one born of hard science but which hovers unfixed to the realm of common utility—McKean performs a kind of radical, interdisciplinary sleight-of-hand. The Great Circuit project remains profoundly elusive even as it directly engages realms as diverse as phenomenology, mathematics, economics, ecology and spirituality."

McKean is known for spending many years to complete projects. Notably, he worked for 10 years developing The Rainbow: Certain Principles of Light and Shapes between Forms a project that created a fully self-sufficient urban rainwater harvesting system used to create real prismatic rainbows. In 2012 the project was realized at the Bemis Center for Contemporary Arts.

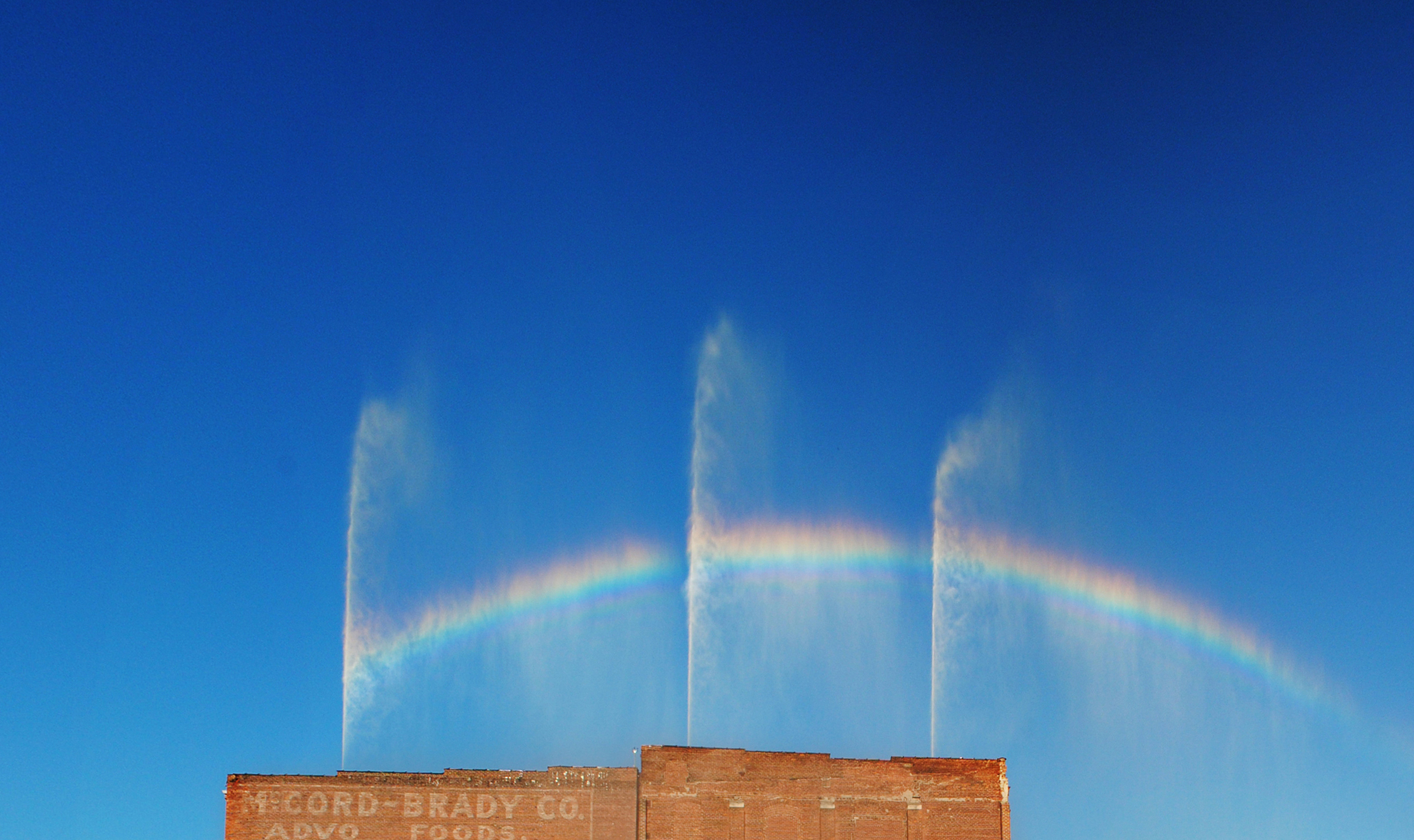
Michael Jones McKean's artwork entitled The Rainbow: Certain Principles of Light and Shapes between Forms at the Bemis Center for Contemporary Arts in Omaha, Nebraska in 2012

Speaking of the resonance of the rainbow image McKean states: "through all of time there has been only one rainbow. Coded within the image there is a consistency, an extreme fidelity in the essential form of a rainbow. The image doesn't evolve or degrade in the same way a piece of fruit does, or an iPod does, or even more stoically the way a mountain does — it is a constant. When we see a rainbow we are communing with our ancestors — seeing exactly the same shape they saw just as we astral project into the future witnessing the same event our children's children will see. It races out to the edges of time. But this image is also fully absorbed in the here-and-now and in all its fleeting fragility, at the moment we witness a rainbow it reminds us that we are also here, and right now. As someone that thinks a lot about objects and time, the rainbow became an interesting starting point to build a series of metaphors about objects, time and people...."

McKean is interested in giving new and expanded agency to materials and objects. Mckean's work is often aligned with speculative realism and object oriented philosophies. Speaking with Clayton Sean Horton in 2013 in advance of his solo show at Horton Gallery in New York City, McKean states:

"The sculptures embrace a double-reality where materials and objects travel between their lives 'with us;' a reality that supports their associative meanings, poetics, functions, references, mythologies, politics, and ordering systems that we construct for them, and their inward, private lives as pure material 'without us;' a parallel, more speculative reality where objects float in psychic voids, ambivalent to our desires and needs for them….

I'm curious if somewhere in-between this object-oriented shadow world freed from human associations, and the mind-dependent, literate world we create for objects, there might be a fucked-up, but totally generative 'third thing.' Maybe an animistic plane of spirited forms evading us, escaping the gravitational pull of our poems and our metaphors. A place where objects, when they choose to visit us, do so with all their unknowable intelligence and perverse strangeness intact. Your question about 'backstory' - this invisible, unobservable reality existing around objects - could help access this 'third thing.' Generationally, we seem increasingly skilled at parsing tiny, even alchemical details that exist, or we believe to exist within objects…."

== Twelve Earths ==
In 2017 McKean began work on a planetary sculpture titled Twelve Earths. The project, currently in development, launched as an extended collaboration with L.A. based group Fathomers—a creative research institute interested in producing long-term artworks. With the assistance of an interdisciplinary team of scientists, geographers, designers, technologists and more, the project will connect twelve invocatory sites around the earth along a perfect ring - a great circle. Over the next ten years, with the project scheduled to conclude in 2028, Twelve Earths will reveal a complex portrait of the earth.

Speaking on behalf of McKean's project Stacy Switzer, director of Fathomers, discloses: "Twelve Earths is a project born of deep, abiding curiosity about the full range of possible experience on this planet. It insists that we think beyond ourselves and outside the myopia of the present to consider the past and future as tangible, affecting frames of reference."

== The Teignmouth Electron ==
McKean is the owner of the Teignmouth Electron, an infamous 40 foot trimaran yacht helmed by the late Donald Crowhurst, who failed in his attempt to become the first person to circumnavigate the earth solo, without stopping. Crowhurst's voyage, mental collapse and alleged suicide are well documented in the 1970 book "The Strange Last Voyage of Donald Crowhurst" by Nicholas Tomalin. After years of researching the boat and its history, in 2007 McKean purchased the vessel, currently beached on Cayman Brac, as a means of fundamentally altering the relationship with the object.

Speaking of the Teignmouth Electron, McKean states: "I think the Electron is quite easy to appreciate as an elegant metaphor about life, yearning, failure. But these concepts seem overly available. In this sense, it's vital to not let our relationships with objects default into passive, ugly connoisseurship. That's like tourism. As I've grown to understand it, the Electron resists; it will not be sculpture, it will not be an artwork. It wouldn't even be a boat. I can think about the Electron as a set of dimensions with a certain width and length and girth that displaces a specific amount of volume on the planet. After that it flows over what's available to me…"

== Interviews ==
1. "An Evolving Turn: A conversation with Timur Si-Qin, Michael Jones McKean and Pablo Larios," DIS, April 2013.
2. Q & A with Clayton Sean Horton and Michael Jones McKean
3. "Priscilla Frank, "Michael Jones McKean To Build Rainbow Over Bemis Center For Contemporary Arts," Huffington Post, May 2012.
4. Eric Zimmerman, Interview: "The Historian and the Astronomer," might be good, issue #98.
5. "In Conversation," interview for the wake the saint the sound the branch, Project Gentili, Prato, Italy.
6. "Dark Psychedelia: A conversation between Gean Moreno and Michael Jones McKean," DIS, 2014

== Bibliography ==
- Michael Jones McKean: The Religion, text: Hannah Walsh; forward, preface: Sharon McConnell; editor: Walter McConnell; photography: Lydia Anne McCarthy, published 2014, ISBN 0984007806
- the wake the saint the sound the branch, text: Matthew Edgeworth, Stephen Lichty, images: Jacopo Menzani, published 2009, ISSN 1973-2163
- Michael Jones McKean: Selected Projects 2003–2008, foreword by Brian Gillis, essay by Stacy Switzer, published 2009 ISBN 978-1-60585-702-2
- "The Possibility of Men and the River Shallows", foreword by Diane Barber, interview with Christopher Cook, published 2007
