= Jonny Persey =

British film producer

Personal details
- Spouse: Tamara Persey
- Children: 3

Jonny Persey is a British film producer.

Jonny Persey grew up in North London and attended The Haberdashers' Aske's Boys' School in Elstree.

To-date, Persey's most notable film credit was as producer for the 2003 hit, Wondrous Oblivion. He is also producer of Deep Water, which opened in the UK on 15 December 2006.
