= Wondrous Oblivion =

- Directed by: Paul Morrison
- Written by: Paul Morrison
- Produced by: Jonny Persey
- Starring: Sam Smith; Delroy Lindo; Stanley Townsend; Emily Woof
- Distributed by: Momentum Pictures
- Release date: 2003
- Running time: 106 minutes
- Countries: United Kingdom; Germany
- Languages: English; Hebrew
- Box office: $1,374,302

Wondrous Oblivion is a 2003 British film directed and written by Paul Morrison and produced by Jonny Persey.

Set in suburban south London in 1960, several themes run through the film, though the main storyline concerns the friendship between a young boy, David Wiseman (Sam Smith) who is the son of European Jewish immigrants, and his new next-door neighbours, father Dennis (Delroy Lindo) and young daughter Judy (Leonie Elliott), who are Jamaican immigrants. The cement which binds their friendship is a deep love of cricket - but the ride is not always smooth. David finds himself falling for the indifferent Judy, but tensions between other families in the street, and a romantic relationship between Ruth Wiseman (Emily Woof) and Dennis, threaten to break apart the neighbourhood.
