= Rodney Hallworth =

British crime journalist and publicist

Rodney Peterson Hallworth (3 June 1929 – 15 June 1985) was a British crime journalist and publicist. He was born in Stockport and died in Newton Abbot, Devon, England.

== Career ==
=== Journalism ===
Hallworth worked as a crime reporter for the Daily Mail. He reported on many cases but most famously on that of suspected serial killer Dr John Bodkin Adams in 1956. Hallworth was very close to the main investigating officer, Herbert Hannam, and twice during the investigation he himself was investigated: once for being discovered with a memorandum alleging a homosexual link between Adams, a local magistrate (Sir Roland Gwynne) and a local policeman; and a second time for leaking information to two Members of Parliament that the Attorney-General Reginald Manningham-Buller had handed a confidential police report to the British Medical Association (who were organising Adams' defence). Both times Hallworth was given a dressing-down but no more. Hallworth later co-wrote a book about the case, published in 1983 after Adams' death. In it he accused the prosecuting counsel of mismanaging the case, saying that Adams, who was acquitted, was in fact a murderer. Later Hallworth joined the rival Daily Express, hoping to replace Percy Hoskins as head crime reporter. However, Hoskins carried on in his position and Hallworth was left to "wither on the vine".

=== Publicity ===
Hallworth eventually left the Daily Express to become a publicist, representing amongst others, ill-fated yachtsman Donald Crowhurst in 1968–69. Crowhurst disappeared during a round-the-world yacht race and Hallworth flew to the Caribbean to collect his boat's logbooks, which he then sold to The Times newspaper. Hallworth's part in the affair brought him a lot of criticism, leading to his being called "unscrupulous". According to others who knew him, however, Hallworth was a "genial, rotund chap" who was "larger than life".

== Portrayals ==
Hallworth is played by David Thewlis in the 2017 film The Mercy, about the 1968 Sunday Times Golden Globe Race.

== Books ==
- The Last Flowers On Earth, Angley Book Co., Maidstone 1966. OCLC 462028
- Co-written with Mark Williams; Where there's a will... The sensational life of Dr John Bodkin Adams, Capstan Press, Jersey, 1983. ISBN 0-946797-00-5

== Articles ==
Hallworth's article, "The Murdered City", appeared in the April 1966 issue of Devon Life magazine. "The heart of Exeter is dead," he wrote, and then proceeded to criticize severely the postwar rebuilding of the city. Hallworth praised the as-yet-unfinished Exeter University (founded in 1955).
