= Donald Crowhurst =

British yacht racer (1932–1969)

- Crowhurst in 1968
- Born: Donald Charles Alfred Crowhurst; 1932; Ghaziabad, British India
- Died: July 1969 (aged 36–37)
- Known for: The Sunday Times Golden Globe Race
- Spouse: Clare Crowhurst (m. 1957)
- Children: 4

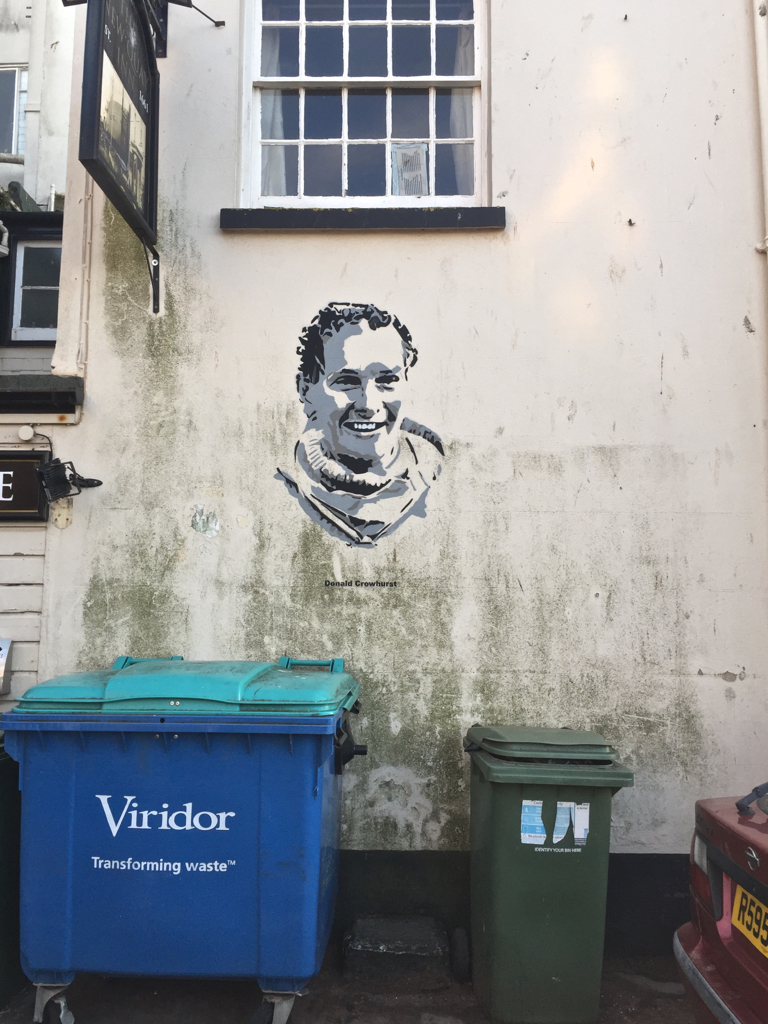
Tribute to Crowhurst, New Quay Inn, Teignmouth

Donald Charles Alfred Crowhurst (1932 – July 1969) was a British electronics engineer, businessman, and amateur sailor who disappeared while competing in the Sunday Times Golden Globe Race, a single-handed, round-the-world yacht race held in 1968–1969. He secretly abandoned the race some weeks or months after departing, remaining in the Atlantic Ocean for seven months while reporting false positions. Contemporary reporting focused on his fraudulent reports and emphasised his actions as a hoaxer or "con man". However, with the passage of time, his story has tended to be reappraised as more of a maritime tragedy that, according to one recent author, "raises essential questions about the ethics of competition, solitude at sea and the psychological limits of sailors".

Crowhurst's participation in the race, together with its ultimately tragic end, has exerted a fascination over many commentators and artists. It has inspired a number of books, stage plays and films, including a documentary, Deep Water (2006), and two feature films, Crowhurst and The Mercy (both 2017), in which Crowhurst is played by the actors Justin Salinger and Colin Firth, respectively. Teignmouth Electron ended its days as a dive boat in the Caribbean and its decaying remains can still be found in the dunes above a beach in the Cayman Islands.

== Early life ==
Donald Crowhurst was born in 1932 in Ghaziabad, British India. His mother was a schoolteacher and his father worked in the Indian railways. During her pregnancy, his mother had longed for a daughter, and Crowhurst was dressed as a girl until the age of seven. After India gained independence, his family moved back to England. The family's retirement savings were invested in an Indian sporting goods factory, which later burned down during rioting after the partition of India.

Crowhurst's father died in 1948. Because of family financial problems, Crowhurst was forced to leave school early that year and started a five-year apprenticeship at the Royal Aircraft Establishment at Farnborough Airfield. In 1953 he received a Royal Air Force commission as a pilot, but was asked to leave in 1954 for reasons that remain unclear, and was subsequently commissioned into the Royal Electrical and Mechanical Engineers in 1956. After leaving the Army the same year owing to a disciplinary incident, Crowhurst eventually moved to Bridgwater, where he started a business called Electron Utilisation in 1962. He was a member of the Liberal Party and was elected to Bridgwater Borough Council.

=== Business ventures ===
Crowhurst, a weekend sailor, designed and built a radio direction finder called the Navicator, a handheld device that allowed the user to take bearings on marine and aviation radio beacons. While he did have some success selling his navigational equipment, his business began to fail. In an effort to gain publicity, he started trying to gain sponsors to enter the Sunday Times Golden Globe Race. His main sponsor was English entrepreneur Stanley Best, who had invested heavily in Crowhurst's failing business. Once committed to the race, Crowhurst mortgaged both his business and home against Best's continued financial support, placing himself in a grave financial situation.

== The Golden Globe Race ==
The route of the Golden Globe Race

The Golden Globe Race was inspired by Francis Chichester's successful single-handed round-the-world voyage, stopping in Sydney. The considerable publicity his achievement garnered led a number of sailors to plan the next logical step – a non-stop, single-handed, round-the-world sail.

The Sunday Times had sponsored Chichester, with highly profitable results, and was interested in being involved with the first non-stop circumnavigation, but it had the problem of not knowing which sailor to sponsor. The solution was to promote the Golden Globe Race, a single-handed, round-the-world race, open to all comers, with automatic entry. This was in contrast to other races of the time, for which entrants were required to demonstrate their single-handed sailing ability before entry.

Entrants were required to start between 1 June and 31 October 1968, to pass through the Southern Ocean in the summer. The prizes offered were the Golden Globe trophy for the first single-handed circumnavigation, and a £5,000 cash prize for the fastest. This was then a considerable sum, equivalent to almost £73,000 in 2023.

The other contestants were Robin Knox-Johnston, Nigel Tetley, Bernard Moitessier, Chay Blyth, John Ridgway, William King, Alex Carozzo and Loïck Fougeron. "Tahiti" Bill Howell, a noted multihull sailor and competitor in the 1964 and 1968 OSTAR races, originally signed up as an entrant but did not actually race.

Crowhurst hired Rodney Hallworth, a crime reporter for the Daily Mail and then the Daily Express, as his public relations officer.

=== Crowhurst's boat and preparations ===
The boat Crowhurst built for the voyage, Teignmouth Electron, was a modified 40-foot (12 m) trimaran designed by Californian Arthur Piver. At the time, this was an unproven type of boat for a voyage of such length. Trimarans have the potential to sail much more quickly than monohulled sailboats, but early designs in particular could be very slow if overloaded, and had considerable difficulty sailing close to the wind. Trimarans are popular with many sailors for their stability, but if capsized (for example by a rogue wave), they are virtually impossible to right, though crews have lived for months with a boat in the inverted position and ultimately survived.

To improve the safety of the boat, Crowhurst had planned to add an inflatable buoyancy bag on the top of the mast to prevent capsizing, the bag would be activated by water sensors on the hull designed to detect an impending capsize. This innovation would hold the mast horizontal on the surface of the water, and a clever arrangement of pumps would allow him to flood the uppermost outer hull, which would (in conjunction with wave action) pull the boat upright. His scheme was to prove these devices by sailing round the world with them, then go into business manufacturing the system.

However, Crowhurst had a very short time in which to build and equip his boat while securing financing and sponsors for the race. In the end, all of his safety devices were left uncompleted; he planned to complete them while under way. Also, many of his spares and supplies were left behind in the confusion of the final preparations. Furthermore, Crowhurst had never sailed on a trimaran before taking delivery of his boat several weeks before the beginning of the race.

On 13 October an experienced sailor, Lieutenant Commander Peter Eden, volunteered to accompany Crowhurst on his last leg from Cowes to Teignmouth. Crowhurst had fallen into the water several times while in Cowes, and as he and Eden climbed aboard Teignmouth Electron, he once again ended up in the water after slipping on the outboard bracket on the stern of the rubber dinghy. Eden's description of his two days with Crowhurst provides the most expert independent assessment available for both boat and sailor before the start of the race. He recalls that the trimaran sailed immensely swiftly, but could get no closer to the wind than 60 degrees. The speed often reached 12 knots, but the vibrations encountered caused the screws on the Hasler self-steering gear to come loose. Eden said, "We had to keep leaning over the counter to do up the screws. It was a tricky and time consuming business. I told Crowhurst he should get the fixings welded if he wanted it to survive a longer trip!" Eden also commented that the Hasler worked superbly and the boat was "certainly nippy."

Eden reported that Crowhurst's sailing techniques were good, "but I felt his navigation was a mite slapdash. I prefer, even in the Channel, to know exactly where I am. He didn't take too much bother with it, merely jotting down figures on a few sheets of paper from time to time." After struggling against westerlies and having to tack out into the Channel twice, they arrived at 2.30 PM on 15 October, where an enthusiastic BBC film crew started filming Eden in the belief he was Crowhurst. There were 16 days to get ready before the race's deadline on 31 October.

=== Departure and deception ===
Crowhurst left from Teignmouth, Devon, on the last day permitted by the rules: 31 October 1968. He encountered immediate problems with his boat, his equipment, and his lack of open-ocean sailing skills and experience. In the first few weeks he was making less than half of his planned speed. Among the principal issues with his boat was constant ingress of seawater via additional deck hatches that he had specified. When the flexible rubber that he had requested to seal them had turned out to be unavailable, a non-flexing version had been used instead, with the result that the hatches never sealed properly. A compounding issue was that a crucial hose, which would have eased the problem of pumping out the flooded sections, had been left behind on the shore and never made it to the boat before its departure.

Crowhurst was thus faced with the choice of either quitting the race and facing financial ruin and humiliation or continuing to possible death in his unseaworthy boat. According to his logs, Crowhurst's biggest fear were the rough conditions in the Southern Ocean, since his innovative and self-designed anti-capsize modifications had never been completed; accordingly, he gave himself only 50/50 odds of surviving that ocean. Whether or not the vessel itself would indeed have stood up to Southern Ocean conditions was never tested; fellow competitor Nigel Tetley, in his own Piver-designed trimaran, did successfully traverse that leg but his by-then-failing boat broke up in the Atlantic Ocean on his final return leg. Crowhurst considered discussing his situation with Stanley Best (presumably to see whether the latter would countenance his withdrawal from the race without calling in the loan funds) but his generator was broken at the time and it seems that, either for that reason or another, such a conversation never occurred.

Over the course of November and December 1968, the hopelessness of his situation pushed Crowhurst into an elaborate deception. He shut down his radio with a plan to loiter in the South Atlantic for several months while the other boats sailed the Southern Ocean, falsify his navigation logs, then slip back in behind the other contestants for the return leg to England. As last-place finisher, he assumed his false logs would not receive the same scrutiny as those of the winner; however, he would retain some acclaim for supposed successful completion of the race and not risk forfeiture of his business (and home) under the terms of his financial obligation to Best.

The approximate positions of the racers on 19 January 1969, including Crowhurst's claimed, assumed and actual positions.

Since leaving, Crowhurst had been deliberately ambiguous in his radio reports of his location. By early December, based on his false reports, he was being cheered worldwide as the likely winner of the fastest circumnavigation prize, though Francis Chichester privately expressed doubts about the plausibility of Crowhurst's progress. Starting on 6 December, he continued reporting vague but false positions; rather than continuing to the Southern Ocean, he sailed erratically for several months in the southern Atlantic Ocean and stopped once in South America to make repairs to his boat, in violation of the rules; in fact, his disqualification would technically date from the 6 March, when Crowhurst unwittingly anchored on a sandbank off the Argentine Río Salado and had to be towed off by a local fisherman Nelson Messina, before any repairs had been made. (Note: Although he clearly wished to keep knowledge of his illegal South American stop secret from the Race organisers and the world at large, relevant details were faithfully recorded in Crowhurst's log and discovered when the boat was found empty. Local investigations were then undertaken by the Sunday Times Correspondent in Buenos Aires, Robert Lindley, who was able to confirm Crowhurst's account and record additional detail, including that Crowhurst had given his name and passport number to the commander of the small local coastguard post, which had duly recorded his name as "Charles Alfred", a mis-interpretation of Crowhurst's full name "Donald Charles Alfred Crowhurst" as given in his passport. Up to that illegal tow and then port call for repairs, Crowhurst was still technically in the race, since he was still "at sea", had broken no race rules and not announced any withdrawal, and could, in theory, still attempt to complete the circumnavigation at a time of his own choosing.) A great deal of this portion of Crowhurst's voyage was spent in radio silence, while his supposed position was inferred by extrapolation based on his earlier reports.

After rounding the tip of South America in early February, Moitessier had made a dramatic decision in March to drop out of the race and sail on towards Tahiti. On 22 April 1969, Robin Knox-Johnston was the first to complete the race, leaving Crowhurst supposedly in the running against Tetley for second to finish, and still able to beat Knox-Johnston's time because of his later starting date. In reality, Tetley was far in the lead, having long ago passed within 150 nautical miles (278 km) of Crowhurst's hiding place; but believing himself to be running neck-and-neck with Crowhurst, Tetley pushed his failing boat, also a 40-foot (12 m) Piver trimaran, to breaking point and had to abandon ship on 30 May.

The pressure on Crowhurst had therefore increased, since he now looked certain to win the "elapsed time" race. If he appeared to have completed the fastest circumnavigation, his logbooks would be closely examined by experienced sailors, including the experienced and skeptical Chichester, and the deception would likely be exposed. It is also likely that he felt guilty about undermining Tetley's genuine circumnavigation so near its completion. He had by this time begun to make his way back as if he had rounded Cape Horn.

Crowhurst made his last radio transmissions on 29 June. His last logbook entry was dated 1 July. Teignmouth Electron was found adrift, unoccupied, on 10 July.

=== Mental condition and final philosophical writings ===
Crowhurst's behaviour as recorded in his logs indicates a complex and troubled psychological state. His commitment to fabricating the voyage reports seemed incomplete and self-defeating, as he reported unrealistically fast progress that was sure to arouse suspicion. By contrast, he spent many hours painstakingly constructing false log entries, often more difficult to complete than real entries because of the celestial navigation research required.

The last several weeks of his log entries, once he was facing the real possibility of winning the prize, showed increasing irrationality. His biographers, Nicholas Tomalin and Ron Hall, believe that faced with a choice between two impossible situations—either admit his fraud and then face public shame and likely financial ruin including the loss of the family home, or return home to a fraudulent hero's reception, and then have to live with the guilt and possible subsequent unmasking—Crowhurst descended into a "classical paranoia", a "psychotic disorder in which deluded ideas are built into a complex, intricate structure." (Note: Although over 50 years have now elapsed since Tomalin and Hall reached these conclusions, they remain the "accepted version" of events and have not been challenged by any more recent researchers. Crowhurst's complete logbooks (to which those authors had access) remain unpublished in the main, although portions were transcribed by, and facsimiles included in, Tomalin and Hall's book.) Others, including practising clinical psychologist Geoff Powter, who included a chapter devoted to Crowhurst in his book Strange and Dangerous Dreams: The Fine Line Between Adventure and Madness, have postulated that Crowhurst may have suffered from undiagnosed bipolar disorder, which, accentuated by his eventual psychologically fraught situation, could account for his apparent alternation between manic and depressed episodes as evident from the later entries in his logbooks. On 24 June, he began to document these thoughts in a new set of writings in his second logbook, titled "Philosophy". Although rambling and incoherent at times, he was attempting to set down, for the benefit of mankind, a "revelation" or new understanding that he believed he had discovered regarding the relationship between man and the universe. Life, as experienced by man, was a "game", overseen by "cosmic beings", apparently God (or several gods) and the Devil, who set the rules by which "the game" was played. However, man could, by an effort of will, become one such "second generation cosmic being" himself, and thereby withdraw from "the game" on his own terms if he so wished. He would then enter a world of "abstract intelligence" (the realm of gods) in which he would have no need for his body, or any of the other trappings of daily life. At one point he wrote that this "revelation" made him happy:

...That is how I solved the problem. And to let you inside my soul, which is now "at peace" I give you my book. I am lucky. I have done something interesting at last. At last my system has noticed me!

Whereas at other points his writings documenting mental arguments—with himself, with Albert Einstein, or with God—reveal a tortured soul on the brink of self-destruction. While suicide is not explicitly mentioned as an escape route, Tomalin and Hall believe that Crowhurst (whether or not he was admitting it to himself) was groping towards this eventuality with phrases such as "The quick are quick, and the dead are dead. That is the judgement of God. I could not have endured the terrible anguish and meaningless waiting, in fact," as well as "Man is forced to certain conclusions by virtue of his mistakes."

He continued his writings for a week, eventually amounting to more than 25,000 words. At 10 a.m. on 1 July (by his own reckoning, since in his meditations he had omitted to wind his chronometer and had to subsequently restart it), Crowhurst commenced what Tomalin and Hall believed to be his "final confession," also incorporating (in their view) a count of hours, minutes and seconds towards the time at which he had decided that he would end "the game" by committing suicide. His notes over the next 80 minutes are generally cryptic and/or incomplete, but include writings such as:

10 23 40: Cannot see any purpose in game.

10 25 10: Must resign position in sense that if set myself "impossible" task then nothing achieved by game...

10 29: Now is revealed the true nature and purpose and power of the game offence
I am what I am and I see the nature of my offence
...
It is finished
It is finished
IT IS THE MERCY

11 15 00 It is the end of my my game the truth has been revealed and it will be done as my family require me to do it

11 17 00 It is the time for your move to begin
I have not need to prolong the game
It has been a good game that must be ended at the
I will play this game when I choose I will resign the game 11 20 40
There is no reason for harmful

It is unclear from the spacing whether "11 20 40" was the time of his last entry, or whether it runs on from the preceding wording as his intended time for his ultimate action. Likewise, while the phrase "IT IS THE MERCY" is obscure, most commentators have accepted that it signifies his relief that, at last, he is leaving an unbearable situation.

Tomalin and Hall conjecture that included in his last writings (not all reproduced above) were sentences that cover Crowhurst's internal debate over whether or not to leave the evidence of his actual, rather than faked, journey for posterity to see, and that he decided that the former was the better course; in the event, it was the "true" logbook that was left behind, and the "fake" one (if it ever existed) disappeared, along with the vessel's chronometer (its case was found empty), and Crowhurst himself. The disappearance of the vessel's chronometer (clock), apparently following Crowhurst's final diary entry, remains unexplained.

=== Disappearance and presumed death ===
Crowhurst's last log entry having been on 1 July 1969, it is assumed that he then either fell or stepped overboard, and drowned. The state of the boat gave no indication that it had been overrun by a rogue wave, or that any accident had occurred which might have caused Crowhurst to fall overboard. From his apparent state of mind as indicated by his most recent logbook entries and philosophical statements, it seems likely that he deliberately decided to take his own life, possibly in an effort to become a "second generation cosmic being" according to his belief (and thereupon have no further need for his earthly body), although the possibility that he met with some sort of accident, intending to return to continue writing in his logbook, cannot be completely dismissed. Three logbooks (two navigational logs and a radio log) and a large mass of other papers were left on his boat to communicate his philosophical ideas and to reveal his actual navigational course during the voyage. The boat was found with the mizzen sail up. Although his biographers, Tomalin and Hall, discounted the possibility that some sort of food poisoning contributed to his mental deterioration, they acknowledged that there is insufficient evidence to rule it, or several other hypotheses, out. They also acknowledged that other hypotheses could be constructed, involving further deception— such as that Crowhurst had perhaps faked his own death, and somehow survived— but that these were extremely unlikely.

Clare Crowhurst, Donald's widow, strongly disputed the theory put forward by Tomalin and Hall regarding the circumstances of her husband's deception and demise, accusing them of mixing fiction with fact. In a letter to The Times published on 10 July 1970, she contended that there was no evidence that her husband had intended to write a fake logbook (none was in fact found), that his death could equally have occurred as the result of misadventure (such as an accident while climbing the mast, which a logbook entry showed that he intended to do before 30 June), and also that Tomalin believed that "all heroes are neurotics, and starting off with this theory, he has sought to prove it by the history of Donald from the earliest age until his death". Nevertheless, later commentators have agreed with Tomalin and Hall's general conclusions, that Crowhurst's long sojourn alone at sea, coupled with his being placed in an impossible dilemma, led to his eventual psychological breakdown and resulting probable suicide.

Interviewed by journalist Chris Eakin for his 2009 book A Race Too Far, Crowhurst's now adult son Simon, when asked whether he believed that his father deliberately stepped off the boat to kill himself, said that on the balance of probabilities (and having studied the logbooks, now in his possession, many times), "it is hard to come to any other conclusion. ... [however] I don't think he did see it as killing himself. He saw it as a kind of transformation into another state of being. In that sense I don't see it as suicide either. He was thinking in a totally different realm by that stage." And in his chapter dealing with Crowhurst, psychiatrist Edward M. Podvoll in his 1990 book Recovering Sanity: A Compassionate Approach to Understanding and Treating Psychosis writes: "In an empty, drifting boat he [Crowhurst] left moment-to-moment journals and logs of his mental content and of the inexpressible states of mind through which he had passed. They describe almost a caricature of the psychotic predicament and the stage: leading to self-transformation. As well as logging his states of mind, often every few minutes, his notations also catch lightning flashes of his momentary awakenings delusion. Naked between the sky and sea, hopelessly beyond his means, caught in a web of deception that had fooled the yachting world and the international press, and in fear of disgrace and dishonor, Crowhurst declared radio silence and 'switched' from the natural world into a cosmic theater of his mind."

== Aftermath ==
=== After the race ===
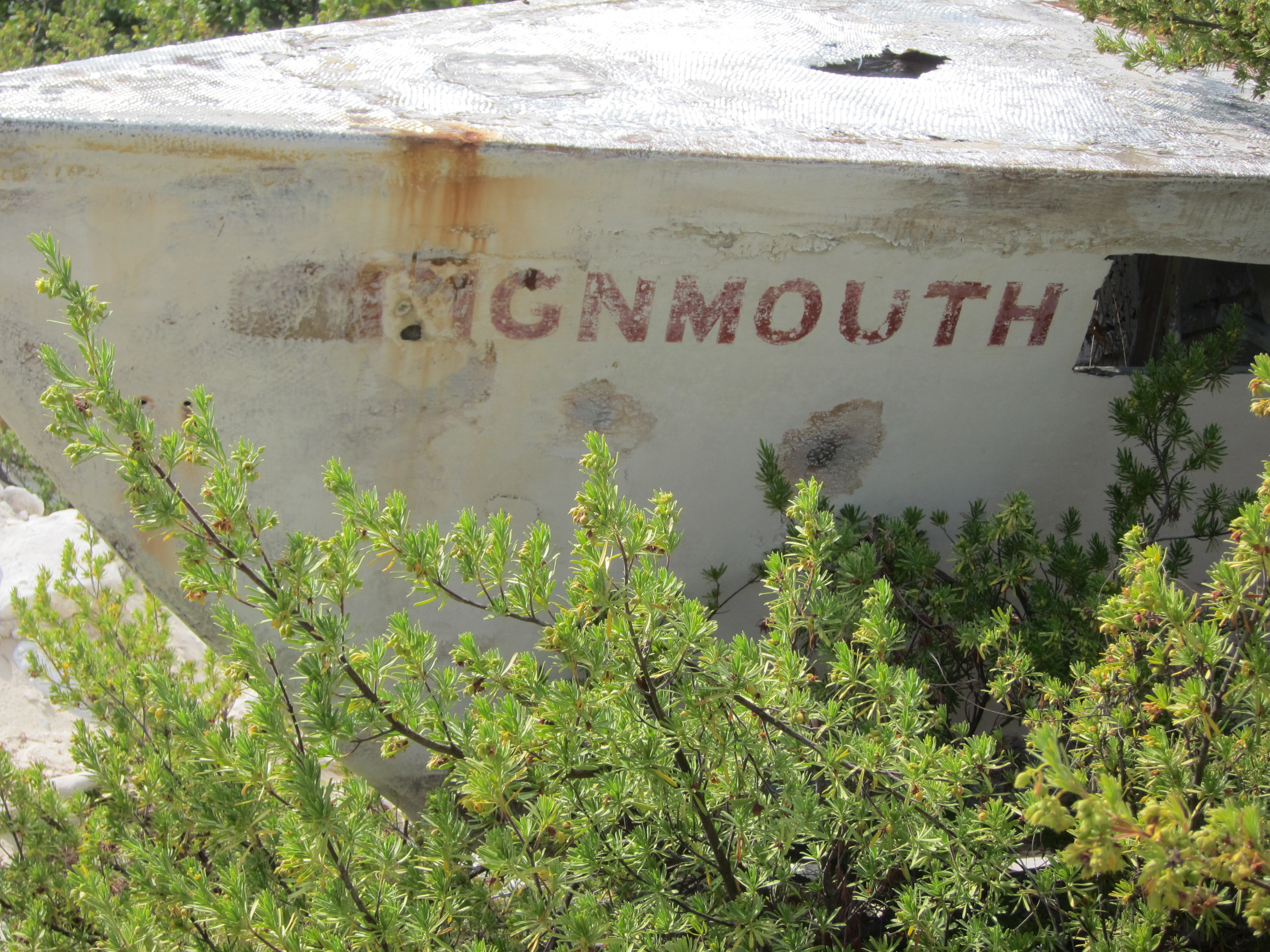
Part of one of the bows of the trimaran Teignmouth Electron. When photographed in March 2011, little identifiable as a boat remained of the wreck above a beach on Cayman Brac. Showing the name Teignmouth and part of the hole where a souvenir hunter has removed Electron.

Teignmouth Electron was found adrift and abandoned on 10 July 1969 by the RMV Picardy, at 33°11′0″N 40°26′0″W. News of Crowhurst's disappearance led to an air-and-sea search in the vicinity of the boat and its last estimated course. Examination of his recovered logbooks and papers revealed the attempt at deception, his mental breakdown and eventual presumed suicide. This was reported in the press at the end of July, creating a media sensation.

Before the deception was revealed, Robin Knox-Johnston donated his £5,000 winnings for fastest circumnavigation to Donald Crowhurst's widow and children. Nigel Tetley was awarded a consolation prize and built a new trimaran.

Teignmouth council considered a proposal to exhibit the boat, charging visitors 2/6d per head, with profits to go to Crowhurst's wife and four children.

Teignmouth Electron was taken to Jamaica and was sold several times, being repurposed and refitted, first as a cruise boat in Montego Bay and later as a dive boat in the Cayman Islands, before being hauled out following a minor incident in 1983, but later damaged by a hurricane and never repaired. The boat still lies decaying on the southwest shore of Cayman Brac.

Facing criticism that the organisers of the 1968 race had not done enough to ensure that only adequately experienced sailors and proven vessels should have been permitted to compete, the organisers of subsequent Golden Globe Races (GGRs) have adopted far more stringent safety criteria for entrants. The rules for the 2018 Golden Globe Race, marking the 50th anniversary of the 1968 race, included stipulations that "Entrants must show prior ocean sailing experience of at least 8,000 miles and another 2000 miles solo, in any boat, as well as an additional 2000 miles solo in their GGR (Golden Globe Race) boat."

While the circumstances that permitted his participation in the race can of necessity only be viewed in the context of the time, safety lessons have been learned by race organisers in particular that would never allow such a combination of an inexperienced sailor, with an untried boat, to take part in an equivalent race today.

=== Reputation and reappraisal ===
Once his disappearance and deception were revealed, contemporary news accounts were far from flattering: in the 2006 documentary Deep Water a 1969 newspaper headline is shown which reads: "LONE SAILOR FAKED WORLD VOYAGE", while in the same documentary, a journalist of the day, Ted Hynds, states: "No one likes to be conned... we were sharp newspapermen, and he conned us." The 1970 book The Strange Last Voyage of Donald Crowhurst by two Sunday Times journalists has been described as "largely unflattering". However, over time the public narrative has changed somewhat, most more recent commentators viewing Crowhurst as a well-intentioned but tragic figure who became caught up in a situation that was initially of his own making but that he could not ultimately control. James Marsh, the director of the film The Mercy, has said: "He made a pretty good go at sailing round the world. He stayed out in the ocean for the best part of seven months so all in all, he achieved much more than people ever thought he could, he just didn't achieve what his objective was. It was a case of over-reach, it was hubris and that is what caused the tragedy of his demise."

Jonathan Raban has written that

The meaning of Crowhurst's voyage has altered greatly since the [1970] book's first publication. In 1970, Crowhurst was seen as a hoaxer who came to a pathetic end... Now he's more likely to be viewed (as Tacita Dean sees him) as a tragic hero, a tortured soul, in involuntary exile from the stable world... Teignmouth Electron has become like a ship in an allegory – a vessel to transport the reader beyond the known world, into a strange and lonely realm where the reader, too, will lose his bearings and face the ultimate disintegration of the self in the cruel laboratory of the sea.

Tomalin and Hall wrote in 1970:

[Previously] we knew little about the personality of Crowhurst... as we investigated further, it emerged as one of the most extraordinary stories of human aspiration and human failure that, as journalists, we have ever had to record. Although it is basically a story about heroics, there is no hero – but neither is there a villain. Crowhurst, despite his deceptions, was a man of courage and intelligence, who acted as he did because of intolerable circumstances. The fact that he paid a far greater penalty than he need [sic] is testament to his quality.

Others have commented that in the intervening time, lessons are there to be learned from Crowhurst's tragedy. Writing on his site "Sailing Calypso", Rick Page, author of "Get Real, Get Gone: How to Become a Modern Sea Gypsy and Sail Away Forever", says:

We are amply assisted in this process by the ‘just do it’ mentality of the advertising world and the ‘you go girl’ attitude of the philosophically challenged who seem to dwell in increasingly regrettable numbers on social media. With growing predictability, nearly every sailing blog carries this quote from Mark Twain: "Twenty years from now you will be more disappointed by the things that you didn’t do than by the ones you did do. So throw off the bowlines. Sail away from the safe harbour. Catch the trade winds in your sails. Explore. Dream. Discover.” This is singularly untrue on an ocean that is largely indifferent to your plans for self-actualisation. ... Crowhurst reminded us that there are caveats to the idea that 'anyone can sail around the world'. He reminded us just how lonesome it is out there and how quickly things can go south – particularly hi-tech electronics that tend to fail at the earliest exposure to salt water. Crowhurst believed the secret of his success would be untested technology and this philosophy was exposed in the most tragic way. ... The death of Donald Crowhurst scared many people into doing the right thing. It is hard to estimate how many lives he saved this way. Donald Crowhurst was a brave, often maligned, example of the fragility of human nature and the vastness of the sea. It was a message that needed to be heard, and still needs to be heard today.

In 2025, Jennifer Champin wrote:

Donald Crowhurst's story continues to challenge the world of sailing. His tragedy raises essential questions about the ethics of competition, solitude at sea and the psychological limits of sailors. The falsification of his positions, the ultimate subterfuge in the face of unbearable pressure, symbolizes his despair as much as it reveals a man's fragility in the face of the immensity of the ocean. For many sailors, his adventure is a warning: the sea tolerates neither illusion nor renunciation. Yet his story continues to fascinate, embodying both the audacity of those who push their limits and the price to be paid for an inordinate quest for recognition. Donald Crowhurst has thus become a paradoxical figure, both victim and actor in his own shipwreck, a legend that haunts the history of solo sailing.

== In popular culture ==
Crowhurst's participation in the race—in reality, two journeys taking place simultaneously, the first the external, physical one regarding his progress in the race and issues affecting his boat, and the second, the inner journey taking place in his mind as recorded in his logbooks—plus his apparent eventual fate have given rise to a number of works. Authors are drawn to its story arc that resembles in some ways a Greek or Shakespearian tragedy (hero brought down by a fatal flaw or flaws), its "amateur takes on the professionals"/"plucky underdog" nature, its implied commentary on the necessity to "dream large" in an otherwise mundane existence, the psychological aspects of Crowhurst's eventual mental unravelling, and the visible contrast between the optimism embodied by the sleek, brand new craft constructed especially for the venture versus its sad remains today; (Note: The use of the present condition of the boat as a metaphor for the end of Crowhurst's dream is of course purely an artistic construct and/or in the mind of the observer, having nothing physically to do with Crowhurst's actions during the period of his ownership, the boat (ironically) surviving the voyage in considerably better shape than its unfortunate owner, its later history being quite unrelated to the Crowhurst era. Of course a counter-argument can also be made, in that, had Crowhurst completed his objective and returned home a hero in some form, a more concerted effort might have been made to preserve his boat. Either way, artists and writers have certainly responded to the physical remnants of the boat as, in the words of both Tacita Dean and its present owner Michael Jones McKean, a "siren-like talisman — a ruin now morphed into relic" (Michael Jones McKean: "Twelve Earths" art project, 2019). Elsewhere (https://www.instagram.com/p/B9PVSdblV2Z/) McKean has written: "On a planet overflowing with objects, the Teignmouth Electron is among the most strange and powerful I know of. ... It's an object, even as it disintegrates, that still magnetizes people into its beautiful, uneasy orbit.") an additional aspect being the moral dilemma of how to act honourably when faced with the choice between two apparently hopeless situations, namely to quit the race and return home to likely financial and/or reputational ruin, or to continue onward with only a small chance of physical survival.

Another angle, picked up in several of the works listed below, is to see Crowhurst as a victim: either of his own dreams of grandeur (or simply desire to save his ailing business and feed his family), misplaced belief in his own untried new technology and powers of adequate organisation to complete it, and fraudulent racing decisions leading to his mental breakdown; of his onerous sponsorship arrangement / over-eager press agent and/or the public's (and the newspaper sponsor's) need for heroes; of the race organisers who failed to insist on any safety precautions or prior experience whatever; or simply the intervention of fate that saw him initially put to sea in an unseaworthy vessel, and later be placed in an unwanted, potential winning position on account of the dropping out of most of the other race participants. As Jonathan Coe wrote in the New Statesman, "one of the explanations for its [Crowhurst's story's] resonance and longevity must be that it can be interpreted in so many different ways".

=== Films and documentaries ===
- Donald Crowhurst – Sponsored for Heroism (1970) a BBC TV film written and narrated by Paul Foot and directed by Colin Thomas
- Horse Latitudes was a 1975 television movie about Crowhurst (called "Philip Stockton, a Canadian" in the film).
- Alone was a 1979 BBC South West television documentary about Crowhurst with investigative journalist Jeremy James. The documentary aired on the tenth anniversary of Crowhurst's disappearance.
- The 1982 French movie Les Quarantièmes rugissants ("The Roaring Forties") is directly inspired by the Crowhurst story.
- The 1986 Soviet film Race of the Century gives a dramatic presentation of the events of the Golden Globe Race and the fate of Donald Crowhurst (Leonhard Merzin). The movie focuses on the idea of competition in a capitalist society as a soul-consuming "rat race", in which all community members (including children) are under constant pressure, and failure and poverty are not tolerated. It portrays Crowhurst as a deeply honest man being forced into a dangerous unwinnable enterprise by his disastrous financial situation and the greed of entrepreneur Best. Crowhurst's suicide is ascribed chiefly to the inability of a moral person to survive in an immoral society.
- The Two Voyages of Donald Crowhurst, a 30-minute BBC Two documentary first broadcast in 1993. Copy available at https://www.youtube.com/watch?v=8boBxNlQSUM; includes much retrieved footage of Crowhurst's journey, 1990s interview with Crowhurst's son Simon, and more.
- British artist Tacita Dean created two experimental short films entitled Disappearance at Sea I (1996, 6 minutes?) and II (1997, 16-mm film, 4-min. loop), partly inspired by the story of Donald Crowhurst. She also published an art book about Teignmouth Electron (Book Works, London, 1999), journeying to Cayman Brac to visit the wreck of the boat. Out of the latter project also came a photographic piece and another short film Teignmouth Electron 2000 (16-mm film, 7 minutes).
- Film Four commissioned a documentary based on the affair in 2006, called Deep Water. The film reconstructs Crowhurst's voyage from his own audio tapes and cine film, interwoven with archive footage and interviews. It was described as 'fascinating' by the New York Times upon its release.
- In 2013 a short film called Une route sans kilomètre was made by Sophie Proux and Laurent Lagarrigue, telling Crowhurst's story.
- 2017 saw the release of Crowhurst, directed by Simon Rumley. The executive producer of the film was Nicolas Roeg, who had himself attempted to film the story in the 1970s.
- The Mercy was released in 2018 with Colin Firth as Donald Crowhurst and Rachel Weisz as Clare, supported by David Thewlis, Ken Stott and Jonathan Bailey. The film was directed by James Marsh and filmed in Teignmouth, Devon.

=== Stage ===
- At the 1991 Edinburgh Festival Fringe a one-man stage play called Strange Voyage was performed in the former Ukrainian Church Halls on Dalmeny Street in Leith. The story was based upon Donald's diaries and broadcast messages sent and received, creating a haunting story of lost hope and looking at the issue of choosing death rather than shame.
- Playwright/actor Chris Van Strander's 1999 play Daniel Pelican adapted the Crowhurst story to a 1920's setting. It was staged site-specifically aboard New York City's Frying Pan Lightship.
- In 1998 the New York-based theatre group The Builders' Association based the first half of their production Jet Lag on Crowhurst's story, although they changed the character's name to Richard Dearborn.
- Jonathan Rich's play The Lonely Sea was runner-up in the Sunday Times International Student Playscript competition in 1979 and was performed by the National Youth Theatre in Edinburgh that year. It was premiered professionally in 1980, as Single Handed at the Warehouse Theatre in Croydon.
- The opera Ravenshead (1998) was based on Donald Crowhurst's story. Steven Mackey (composer), Rinde Eckert (solo performance), The Paul Dresher Ensemble (orchestra).
- Actor and playwright Daniel Brian's award-winning 2004 stage play Almost A Hero dealt with Crowhurst's voyage, descent into madness and death.
- In 2015, Calgary, Canada-based Alberta Theatre Projects in association with Ghost River Theatre premiered the multimedia-heavy The Last Voyage of Donald Crowhurst by Eric Rose and David Van Belle.
- In 2016 actor Jake William Smith portrayed Crowhurst in a one-man show entitled Crow's Nest at the Fresh Meat Festival in Ottawa.

=== Factual books ===
- The Strange Last Voyage of Donald Crowhurst, Nicholas Tomalin and Ron Hall. First published January 1970.
- A Voyage for Madmen, Peter Nichols. Published May 2001.
- Psychiatrist Edward M. Podvoll included an in-depth analysis of Donald Crowhurst's journey in his 1990 book The Seduction of Madness: Revolutionary Insights into the World of Psychosis and a Compassionate Approach to Recovery at Home. The account focuses on Crowhurst's journals and the patterns in the changes and decline in mental status that the entries reveal. The same information is separately presented in a similar 1990 work by the same author entitled Recovering Sanity: A Compassionate Approach to Understanding and Treating Psychosis (Shambhala Publications, 1990).
- A Race Too Far: The Tragic Story of Donald Crowhurst and the 1968 Round-the-World Race, Chris Eakin (Ebury Press, 2017).

=== Novels ===
- In 2009, Isabelle Autissier, herself a renowned sailor, published the novel Seule la mer s'en souviendra (roughly translates as "Only the sea will remember") based on Crowhurst's voyage.
- The 1993 book Outerbridge Reach by Robert Stone (Dog Soldiers, Children of Light) is a novel inspired by the reporting on Crowhurst.
- The title character of Jonathan Coe's 2010 novel The Terrible Privacy of Maxwell Sim is driven by his obsession with Crowhurst's story.
- In the 2010 travelogue Travels with Miss Cindy, Miss Cindy sees Teignmouth Electron on the beach at Cayman Brac.
- A 1999 novel by John Preston, Ink, has a reporter who tracks down an elderly former yachtsman like Crowhurst living alone in a remote English seaside hotel.
- The 2017 novel The Ship Beyond Time, by Heidi Heilig, features Donald Crowhurst in an imaginary alternate universe in which he has time-travelled away from his failing boat, rather than dying at sea.
- Romanian writer Radu Cosașu has a book named Un august pe un bloc de gheață ("An August on a Block of Ice"), which contains numerous references to the story of Crowhurst.

=== Poetry ===
- American poet Donald Finkel based his 1987 book-length narrative poem The Wake of the Electron on Crowhurst's life and fateful voyage.

=== Music ===
- The Scottish band Trashcan Sinatras recorded a song about Crowhurst on their Wild Pendulum album. The title is "Waves (Sweep Away My Melancholy)", which was one of the final entries in the log books of Crowhurst's ill-fated journey.
- Scottish band Stiltskin's song "Horse" on their 1994 album The Mind's Eye was written about the ill-fated voyage from Donald Crowhurst's perspective.
- British musician the Third Eye Foundation released a song called "Donald Crowhurst" on the album Ghost.
- British jazz musician Django Bates included a track called "The Strange Voyage of Donald Crowhurst" on his 1997 album Like Life.
- British dark folk/neofolk project Sieben has a trilogy of songs dedicated to Donald Crowhurst on the Star Wood Brick Firmament 2010 album: "Donald", "Crowhurst" and "Floating". It was completely re-recorded in 2021 as "Donald Crowhurst" for the single "Minack Theatre".
- US experimental metal/noise project Crowhurst by Jay Gambit was named after the Donald Crowhurst story. Also the project's 2013 album In the Speedboat Under the Sea is inspired by the Donald Crowhurst story – and the album's closing track is called "The Last Will and Testament of Donald Crowhurst".
- Scottish band Captain and the Kings released a single in early 2011 entitled "It Is The Mercy", based on Crowhurst's exploits.
- British band I Like Trains wrote a song called "The Deception", which appears on their album Elegies to Lessons Learnt, based upon Donald Crowhurst's story.
- South London hardcore band Lay It on the Line released 'Crowhurst' – a nine-song re-telling of Crowhurst's story – in 2013.
- British folk singer, actor and writer Benjamin Akira Tallamy wrote and recorded "The Teignmouth Electron" based around Crowhurst's breakdown and his death at sea. The song was released on 19 October 2014 with a music video uploaded to YouTube on the same day.
- The English band Crash of Rhinos released the song "Speeds of Ocean Greyhounds" in 2013. It appears as the closing track on the band's second and final album Knots and was written about Crowhurst's voyage and last days at sea.
- American band OSI has a song named "Radiologue", released on their third album, Blood, which appears to be inspired by the story of Crowhurst.
- UK singer-songwriter Adam Barnes' "Electron" (released in 2017) is about the psychotic episodes of Crowhurst's voyage.
- British singer-songwriter Peter Hammill released in 2009 the song "The Mercy", quoting the last entry in the log of Donald Crowhurst.
- The album Battlefield Dance Floor by British folk group Show of Hands includes the song "Lost" inspired by the story.
- British singer-songwriter Ben Howard released in 2021 the song "Crowhurst's Meme", which appears to be inspired by the story of Crowhurst.
- British prog band Frost* released in 2021 the song "Terrestrial" about Crowhurst.

== See also ==
- List of people who disappeared mysteriously at sea

== Bibliography ==
- Tomalin, Nicholas; Hall, Ron (2003) [1970]. The Strange Last Voyage of Donald Crowhurst. Hodder & Stoughton. ISBN 978-0-07-141429-6.
- Harris, John (1981). Without Trace. Atheneum. ISBN 978-0-689-11120-4.
- Nichols, Peter (2001). A Voyage for Madmen. Harper Collins. ISBN 978-0-06-095703-2.
- Eakin, Chris (2009). A Race Too Far. Ebury Press. ISBN 978-1-40-702713-5.
