= Nigel Tetley =

British sailor

Tetley enjoying Christmas dinner solitary on his boat Victress during the Sunday Times Golden Globe Race, 1968.

Nigel Tetley (8 February 1924 – 2 February 1972) was a British sailor who was the first person to circumnavigate the world solo in a trimaran.

== The race ==
A native of South Africa, and a Lieutenant-Commander in the Royal Navy, Tetley entered the 1968 Sunday Times Golden Globe Race, which was the first non-stop, single-handed, round-the-world yacht race. Tetley sailed the Victress, a plywood trimaran that also doubled as his home.

He completed the circumnavigation when he crossed his outgoing track on the evening of 22 April 1969, but at that point he was still 5,000 nautical miles (9,300 km) from finishing the race and claiming the prize for fastest passage. The Victress at this point was slowly disintegrating, but Tetley thought he was being chased by another trimaran piloted by Donald Crowhurst, so instead of nursing his ailing boat along, he continued to sail as hard as he could.

With 1,200 nautical miles (2,200 km) to go, shortly after midnight on 21 May, the Victress broke up and sank under him. Tetley had time to get off a Mayday call before taking to his life raft, and was picked up the following afternoon.

It later turned out that Tetley had not needed to hurry. Donald Crowhurst had faked his round-the-world trip, sailing only in the Atlantic and radioing false position reports. Tetley was awarded a £1,000 consolation prize by the race organizers. By now he was obsessed with properly completing a circumnavigation, so he used the money to immediately build a new trimaran, which he called the Miss Vicky. He wrote a book about the experience that was published the following year.

== Death ==
Tetley was never able to raise enough money to completely outfit the new boat. Though showing no outward signs of stress or depression, he went missing on 2 February 1972. His body was found three days later, hanging from a tree in Ewell Minnis Woods near Dover, England. Three weeks later, at the coroner's inquest, it was revealed that the body had been discovered clothed in lingerie and the hands were bound behind the back. The opinion offered by a pathologist suggested masochistic sexual activity. The coroner, noting there was no evidence that Tetley had deliberately taken his life, recorded an open verdict.

Nigel Tetley was cremated near Dover. Mourners included his wife, Eve, and fellow Golden Globe sailors Robin Knox-Johnston and Chay Blyth.

Eve Tetley died on 22 February 2018.

== Publications ==
- Tetley, Nigel (1970). Trimaran solo: The story of Victress' circumnavigation and last voyage. Lymington (Hampshire): Nautical Publishing Co. ISBN 0-245-59950-9.
