= Deep Water (2006 film) =

- Theatrical release poster
- Directed by: Louise Osmond; Jerry Rothwell
- Written by: Jerry Rothwell
- Produced by: Alison Morrow; Jonny Persey; John Smithson
- Starring: Donald Crowhurst; Clare Crowhurst; Simon Crowhurst; Bernard Moitessier; Françoise Moitessier de Cazalet; Robin Knox-Johnston; Ted Hynds; Donald Kerr; Ron Winspear; Santiago Franchessi
- Narrated by: Tilda Swinton
- Cinematography: Nina Kellgren
- Edited by: Ben Lester
- Music by: Harry Escott; Molly Nyman
- Production companies: Pathé Productions; UK Film Council; FilmFour; Apt Films; Stir Fried Films; Darlow Smithson Productions
- Distributed by: Pathé Distribution
- Release dates: 3 September 2006 (Telluride); 15 December 2006 (United Kingdom)
- Running time: 92 minutes
- Country: United Kingdom
- Language: English
- Box office: $727,202

Deep Water is a 2006 British documentary film directed by Jerry Rothwell and Louise Osmond, and produced by Al Morrow, Jonny Persey and John Smithson. It is based on the true story of British businessman and amateur sailor Donald Crowhurst, as he participated in the Sunday Times Golden Globe Race, a single-handed, round-the-world yacht race held in 1968–69, during which he disappeared. The film reconstructs Crowhurst's voyage from his own audio tapes and cine film, interwoven with archival footage and interviews.

== Production ==
Smithson had previously produced the successful British documentary, Touching the Void (2003).

== Reception ==
The film received critical acclaim. The official poster quotes The Daily Telegraph, 'A movie which will reduce the hardest of hearts to a shipwreck'. Variety said "As it explores the limits of human endurance, the pic should suck even land-lubbers into a whirlpool of gripping adventure, overblown ambitions and sheer human folly". It was described as 'fascinating' by The New York Times upon its release.

The film won the Best Documentary award at the 2006 Rome International Film Festival and a commendation in the Australian Film Critics Association 2007 Film Awards.

The film opened in the UK on 15 December 2006 and grossed $122,384. It was released on 24 August 2007 in the United States where it grossed $271,143 and went on to gross $727,202 worldwide.

On review aggregator website Rotten Tomatoes, the film holds an approval rating of 96% based on 55 reviews, with an average rating of 8.1/10.
