= Silverrudder Challenge =

Annual sailing event

Silverrudder Challenge of the Sea is an annual single-handed sailing event that goes round the island of Funen in Denmark close to the time of the autumn equinox. Silverrudder Challenge of the Sea is the world's biggest singlehanded offshore category 3 regatta in terms of the number of participants. The regatta begins and ends at the town of Svendborg, located at the most southern part of the island of Funen in Denmark.

== History ==
Silverrudder Challenge of the Sea originated with Morten Brandt Rasmussen, former Editor in Chief and Event Designer of the Danish sailing media BådNyt. He developed the idea of a single-handed sailing event for recreational sailors to take place at autumn equinox, and he coined the name first in Danish and later in English. The idea was to make an event for yachtsmen equivalent to that of Marathon running and Ironman triathlon for recreational sailors.

In 2012, the event was a Danish-only regatta and went by the Danish name SølvRoret – Havets Jernmand (Silverrudder – Ironman of the sea). It attracted 15 submissions and 12 boats on the starting line. In 2013 100 skippers submitted and 86 were on the starting line.

In 2014, the event changed the name to Silverrudder Challenge of the Sea. 200 were enlisted and 187 were on the starting line. Half of the participants were from outside Denmark. 8 different nationalities were present and for the first time three of the winners were from outside Denmark.

In 2015, the race sold out at 330 participants some three months before the start. New records were set in 5 of the 7 classes and only three of the records (and thus three Silverrudder Challenge Trophies) remained in Denmark. The remaining five went to participants from Germany.

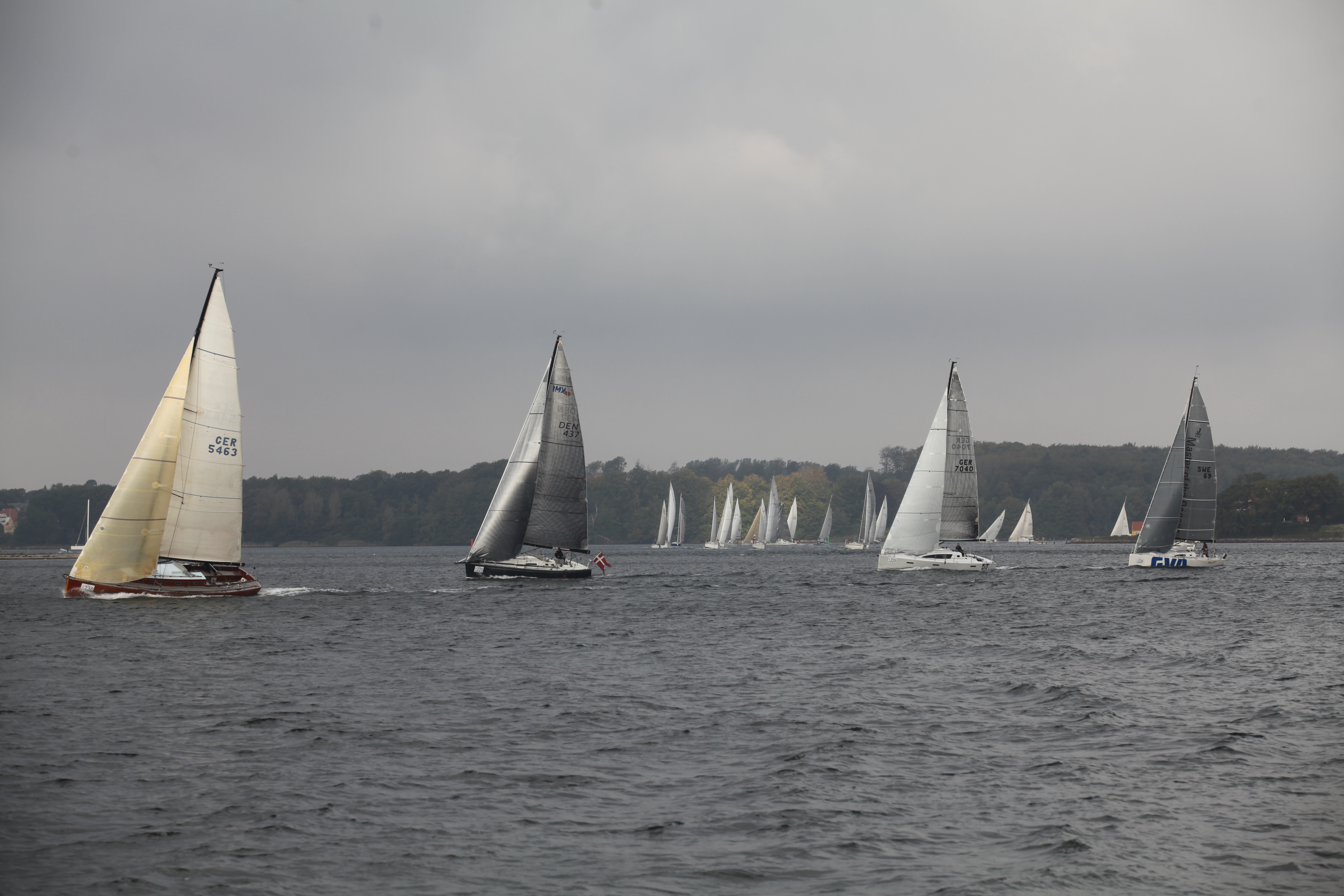
From the start of the race. Photo of the first boats in the fourth start: Keelboats Category Large.

== Categories ==
No measurement rules apply for the race. The boats are divided into different categories based on the length of the boat. There are five categories of keelboats, from mini (18–25 foot in length overall) to extra large (over 40 foot). There are two categories of multihull boats, small and large. There is a Silverrudder Challenge trophy given in each category. The fastest skipper of all times in each category is the holder of a trophy until their time is beaten. Each year before race start the seven trophies are collected by the organiser. After the race it is determine whether one or more Silverrudder Challenge trophies are to change hands. This happens at an award party Saturday evening or Sunday noon.

== The Silverrudder Challenge records ==
- Keelboat mini: Morten Bogacki GER, Pogo2, Mojo, 23 hours 06 minutes 18 seconds. Year 2015
- Keelboat small: Franz Schollmayer GER, Esse 850, Firlefranz, 20 hours 23 minutes 14 seconds. Year 2015
- Keelboat medium: Wolfram Heibeck GER, Open 32, Black Maggy, 19 hours 18 minutes seconds 03. Year 2015
- Keelboat large: Andreas Rohde GER, JPK 38, Ratzfatz3, 19 hours minutes 02seconds 16. Year 2015
- Keelboat extra large: Niels Ditmar DEN, Xc 42, Hokux Pokux, 19 hours 20 minutes 27 seconds. Year 2012
- Multihull small: Anders Bastiansen DEN, Dragonfly 28, 16 hours 24 minutes 58 seconds Year 2015
- Multihull large: Jan Andersen DEN, Black Marlin, Black Marlin, 15 hours 01 minutes 05 seconds. Year 2019

== Change of ownership ==
After the 2015 edition of the race the event had become a well known event for recreational and club yachtsmen and the yards and leisure boat designers throughout Europe getting attention from two of the leading yachting medias in Europa - the German media Yacht and British media Yachting World.

Bådnyt the media owning the event had changed ownership from JSL Publications to Nordjyske Medier [] a news corporation situated in the northern part of Jutland in the city of Aalborg. After a 2015 deficit of 10.000.000 DKK on the magazine publications, owner Per Lyngby and Nordjyske Medier Editor in Chief Turid Fennefoss Nielsen decided promoted a strategy that included full focus on the core business – in Bådnyt's case producing magazine on paper. As Silverrudder Challenge of the Sea is an event a decision was made to remove it from the business portfolio.

In the end of January 2016 Nordjyske Medier donated the event to the local sailing club, Svendborg Amtørsejlklub, that had been the logistical partner during the previous editions of the event. On 8 February 2016 the registration for the 5th edition of the race opened. The event sold out in three weeks when 400 slots were sold. The 5th edition of the event starts on Friday, 23 September 2016.
