= Round Britain and Ireland Yacht Race =

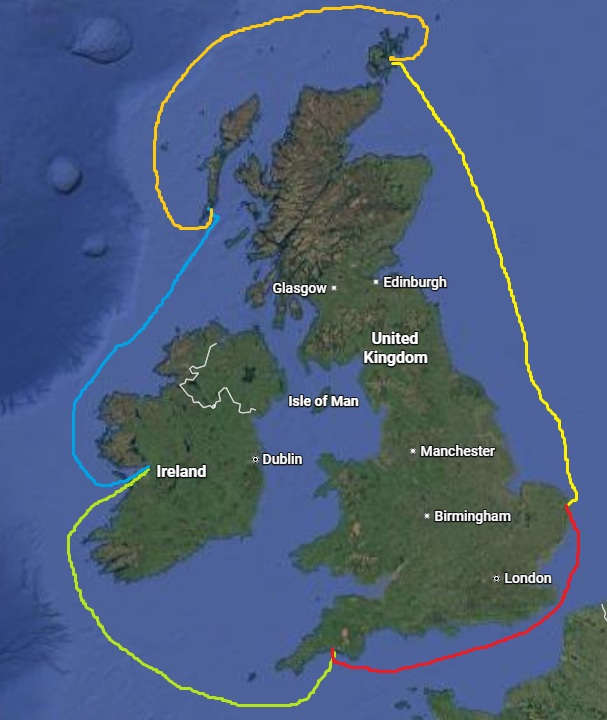
Original course showing the different legsThe end of leg 3 in this graph shows a place in the Orkneys (Kirkwall?), not Lerwick in Shetland. Can someone correct? Original graph was created by Chris tivver

The Round Britain and Ireland double handed Yacht Race was established in 1966 and is held every four years starting and finishing in Plymouth, England. There are four compulsory stops of forty-eight hours, initially at Galway, Barra, Lerwick and Lowestoft.

Following the success of the first two OSTARs, Herbert Hasler proposed to the Royal Western Yacht Club that there should be a two-handed race around the British Isles. The proposal was considered and the first Round Britain and Ireland race was held in 1966. The course, of about 2,000 miles (3,200 km), was split into five legs separated by compulsory stop-overs of 48 hours each at Crosshaven in Ireland, Castle Bay, Barra in the Outer Hebrides, Lerwick in Shetland, and Harwich on the East Coast. It would circumnavigate Britain and Ireland and, with the exception of the Channel Islands and Rockall, all islands and rocks would be left to starboard.

The first race was a great success and the RB&I was established on a four-year cycle although this and the course has varied a little over the years.

The RB&I grew rapidly to a multinational entry of many boat sizes and types. In 1982 the 85 starters included an 80 ft monohull, a 70 ft catamaran, several 60 and 65 ft trimarans, down to a 25 ft monohull, and represented over a dozen nationalities.

The following race was held in 1985, since 1986 was given over to the second TwoSTAR so it could run two years apart from the OSTAR. The four-year cycle continued with races in 1989 and 1993, but reverted (following the last TwoSTAR in 1994) to its original schedule in 1998 and on to the latest race in 2018.

The race is renowned for being very tough due to the variable conditions, large number of turning points and frequent hazards and of course have only two sailors to cope with all the navigation, sail changes etc. This has resulted psychological stress and in a number of disagreements between the skipper and co-skipper resulting in retirements and disqualifications – some of which are described in the individual races below.

The challenge of the course short-handed has attracted some of the most famous names of long distance yachting including Robin Knox Johnston, Chay Blyth; Peter Blake; Ellen MacArthur; Claire Francis and Naomi James.

== Course Details ==
Whilst the mandatory stopovers on the course have changed a number of times some of the details, and thus challenges of the race, have remained throughout this 2000 nm race.

=== Leg 1 ===
This has finished at Galway, Castlehaven and Kinsale. Starting in Plymouth Sound, with spectator boats watching from Jennycliff to the east of Plymouth Sound, competing yachts must pass outside the Eddystone Rocks and Isles of Scilly. If the first stop is on the west coast of Ireland, racers must also stop at Fastnet Rock and its Lighthouse.

=== Leg 2 ===
Leg 2 has always finished at Castlebay, Barra which in bad weather has a tricky harbour entrance but once ashore the sailors are guaranteed a warm welcome. On the way the west coast of Ireland (including the Fastnet rock if not already passed) has to be negotiated. Some yachts have gone offshore, sometimes off the continental shelf whilst others have stayed further inshore where sailors have to be wary of the salmon nets and fishing boats.

=== Leg 3 ===
Leg 3 has always been from Barra to Lerwick, via St Kilda, remote Sula Sgeir, and Muckle Flugga–often referred to as the Cape Horn of the north. The leg finishes in Lerwick where the Lerwick Boating Club are hospitable to all involved in the race, especially the smallest class which they sponsor and celebrate.

=== Leg 4 ===
Leg 4 proceeds down the North Sea, presenting challenges of oil rigs to dodge, and often the first vessels seen at sea by the crews which are not part of the race for some time. The finishes for this leg have been variously Blyth, Lowestoft, and Hartlepool.

=== Leg 5 ===
On the final leg, the crews and boats pass the sand banks in the Thames Estuary and Kent, and shipping in the Dover Straits and English Channel. The finish is at Plymouth (originally at Millbay Docks, now at Queen Anne's Battery).

== Race 1: 1966 ==
The first race was held in largely fair winds and attracted 6 monohulls and 10 multihulls, allowing the latter to prove for the first time what they could achieve in ocean racing. The yacht Tao was disqualified for finishing with only one crew member after the skipper and co-skipper "had a disagreement". The race is summarised below.

	Number of entries	Number of finishers	Number of nationalities	Winning boat	Winning skipper/co-skipper
Overall	16	10	1	Toria	Derek Kelsall / Martin Minter-Kemp

== Race 2: 1970 ==
In the second running of the race there was the first overseas entrant: Philip Weld of the USA. The fleet was split almost evenly between multihulls (13) and monohulls (12). Fresh from his victorious single handed round the world race Robin Knox Johnston was part of the winning crew.

The race started in light airs and they ran into fog off the Lizard. A gentle breeze brought the leaders into Crosshaven leaving the back half of the fleet becalmed and rowing (which is permissible but difficult in short handed ocean races). The second leg to Barra and 3rd leg to Lerwick saw much higher winds and retirements. Another gale on the last leg saw more damage and ensured that the multihulls could not catch Ocean Spirit for the overall win despite her 12-hour penalty. The race is summarised below

	Number of entries	Number of finishers	Number of nationalities	Winning boat	Winning skipper/co-skipper
Overall	25	20	2	Ocean Spirit	Leslie Williams / Robin Knox-Johnston

== Race 3: 1974 ==
The third race saw a big increase to 61 entries, partly due to a growth in international entries as the reputation of the race grew. This reputation is also evidence by the growing list of globally recognised sailing stars. These included Knox-Johnston (again); Peter Blake; Mike Birch; Tony Bullimore and Claire Francis. The yachts were also changing from a more rag-tag group to having dedicated ocean racing yachts including Qualio II which had represented Britain in both the Admirals Cup and Southern Cross as well as Robin Aisher's Frigate.

The race was sailed in gale-force winds for much of the time, permitting a new record of 10 days, 4 hours 26 mins at sea. There were a number of dangerous incidents including Yacht Maureva when she and a Greek merchant ship collided. Earlier in the race Mike McMullen had been tossed overboard when changing a headsail on yacht Three Cheers, his co-skipper Martin Read luffed the boat and dropped all sails, drifted backward to Mike who was winched onboard using a halyard.

Once again a crew pairing could no longer sail with equanimity and so Martin Wills on Tower Casper was disqualified after his crew Colin Hoare asked to be put ashore in Barra.

The race is summarised below.

	Number of entries	Number of finishers	Number of nationalities	Winning boat	Winning skipper/co-skipper
Overall	61 (60 started)	39	5	British Oxygen	Robin Knox-Johnston / Gerald Boxall
Handicap	–	–	–	–	Leslie Dyball/Larry Pardey

== Race 4:1978 ==
Entries and international interest continued to rise, now with a mix of ocean racing yachts and cruising boats. For the first time entries had to be capped at 120 to avoid undue pressure on some the small stopover ports, especially Barra. The race was largely conducted in light winds and some of the boats ran out of time. Some of the more famous entrants included Chay Blyth aboard Great Britain IV, Robin Knox-Johnston back with Great Britain II, Giles Chichester aboard his father Sir Francis Chichester's Gypsy Moth V and Peter Jay, then ambassador to the US, aboard Norvantes. The two boats rafted up whilst becalmed off the East Coast to eat dinner together. This breach of the rules was not protested. The race is summarised below.

	Number of entries	Number of finishers	Number of nationalities	Winning boat	Winning skipper/co-skipper
Overall	120 (74 starters)	62	10	Great Britain IV	Chay Blyth / Rob James

== Race 5: 1982 ==
The reputation of the race had continued to grow which was recognised with the total entries and overseas interest, though unfortunately not in media coverage. Robin Knox-Johnston was back again but incurred a penalty of over 19 hours for late arrival. There were three strong multihull entries from France and also entries from as far afield as South Africa, Australia, St Kitts and the USA. Mary Falk, who would become a stalwart of the race made her first appearance with one of the 3 experienced all female crews.

The weather was generally good, though catamaran Jan II capsized and was rescued by an Irish naval vessel and the Australian trimaran Twiggy capsized and the crew rescued by the Oswald twin in Pepsi- another entrant.

Racing was tight and the lead changed numerous times, but eventually Rob and Naomi James broke the record with a sailing time of 8 days 15 hours and 3 minutes in their 60-foot trimaran Colt Cars GB, with Chay Blyth only 43 minutes behind them. The first monohull was Voortrekker in a time of 18 days 16 hours and 10 minutes. The race is summarised below.

	Number of entries	Number of finishers	Number of nationalities	Winning boat	Winning skipper/co-skipper
Overall	85	69	12	Colt Cars GB	Rob James/Naomi James
Monohull				Vootrekker	Bertie Reed/John Martin

== Race 6: 1985 ==
Sponsored for the first time by the City of Plymouth, the 6th race was held after only a 3-year gap in 1985. A strong entry list included Tony Bullimore and Nigel Irens in Apricot; and Mike Whipp and Adrian Thomson in BCA paragon, both 60-foot Trimarans. Robin Knox Johnston returned with Billy-King Harman. There were also large monohulls including Warren Luhr's Thursday's Child, Voortrekker returning from the previous race and Donald Parr's Qualio of Wight.

At the finish of the first leg at Crosshaven only a minute separated Apricot and Paragon, but Apricot suffered halyard troubles and had to have the mast lifted at Lerwick, Paragon meanwhile beat the 2nd leg course record but then was forced to retire with a torn mainsail and structural damage. Red Star/Night Star (former Colt Cars GB) hit an unlit buoy and damaged the port float which they had to repair. Peter Philips and Bob Fisher retired at the end of leg 1 with rigging problems.

A gale on 17 and 18 July cause many problems resulting in 23 boats holing up in Castle Bay waiting for the weather to abate. This led to many retirements, and another gale between 2 and 4 August caused more mayhem, however the biggest destruction was the destruction of Glucometer II by a Dutch coaster off Beachy Head. Fortunately, the crew were saved. The race is summarised below.

	Number of entries	Number of finishers	Number of nationalities	Winning boat	Winning skipper/co-skipper
Overall	74	51	9	Apricot	Nigel Irens / Tony Bullimore
Monohull				Thursday's Child	Warren Luhr/Unknown

== Race 7: 1989 ==
Back to its 4-year cycle the 1989 race was sponsored by The Observer. French sailors Francois Boucher and Loic Linglois in Saab Turbo (ex Aquitaine II) smashed the record with a sailing time of 15 days, 7 hours and 30 minutes (an average of over 11 knots). The race is summarised below.

	Number of entries	Number of finishers	Number of nationalities	Winning boat	Winning skipper/co-skipper
Overall	60	47	6	SaabTurbo	Francois Bucher/Loic Linglois

== Race 8: 1993 ==
The 8th edition saw a new sponsor – Teesside Development Corporation, and in consequence a new stopover on the East Coast- Hartlepool. Entries overall were down, especially in the larger classes, however the classes for smaller boats – especially monohulls under 30-foot increased substantially. Steve Fosset's 60-foot trimaran looked set to beat the record with strong winds from good angles but light winds in the English Channel foiled him. Brian Thompson did however set a new class V record of 9 days 21 hours 30 minutes. The strong winds that helped the bigger classes rotated to being on the nose for the smaller boats who suffered greatly, resulting in a large number of retirements. The race is summarised below.

	Number of entries	Number of finishers	Number of nationalities	Winning boat	Winning skipper/co-skipper
Overall	62	37	11	Lakota	David Scully/Steve Fossett
Class V				Severalles Challenge	Brian Thompson/Unknown

== Race 9: 1998 ==
Entries were down somewhat though included the legendary Ellen MacArthur and one remarkable entry was from Alan Grace, a paraplegic in Paradox. Together with co-skipper Chris Biggs they were lying 8th after leg 1, but forced to retire with rudder and hull problems. Another race with a lot of gales, however these were from ahead for the bigger yachts so the finishing times were relatively slow. The race is summarised below.

	Number of entries	Number of finishers	Number of nationalities	Winning boat	Winning skipper/co-skipper
Overall	41	27	6	FPC Greenaway	Richard Tolkien / Robert Wingate

== Race 10: 2002 ==
The race is summarised below.

	Number of entries	Number of finishers	Number of nationalities	Winning boat	Winning skipper/co-skipper
Overall	38	20	6	Mollymawk	Ross Hobson/Andrew Newman

== Race 11: 2006 ==
The race is summarised below.

	Number of entries	Number of finishers	Number of nationalities	Winning boat	Winning skipper/co-skipper
Overall	36	32	4	Alacrity	Rex Conn/Etienne Giroire

== Race 12: 2010 ==
The race is summarised below.

	Number of entries	Number of finishers	Number of nationalities	Winning boat	Winning skipper/co-skipper
Overall	40	36	Unknown	Solo	Rune Aasberg/Arid Schei

== Race 13: 2014 ==
The race is summarised below.

	Number of entries	Number of finishers	Number of nationalities	Winning boat	Winning skipper/co-skipper
Overall	15	12	Unknown	Brusails for Brussels	Michel Kleinjans/Alexis Guillaume

== Race 14: 2018 ==
The course changed for this race and whilst it started and finished at Plymouth as always, the stopovers were now at Kinsale, Castle Bay (Barra); Lerwick and Lowestoft.

Storm Hector hit the 2018 edition, causing Cariberia to drop sails and ride out the storm with towed warps. Unfortunately neother their tracker or AIS was working so Lerwick Coastguard, Lifeboat and helicopter were all looking for them.

== Race 15: 2022 ==
The course changed again, with the mandatory 48 hours stopovers now being at Galway, Lerwick and Blyth. The intent was to provide legs that were more balanced in length, and where each leg was of similar length to that of the double-handed offshore race in the 2024 Olympics.

== Race 16: 2024 ==
With another change to the scheduling the 16th edition was in 2024. The race was expanded to permit crew changes in Galway and at Blyth

== Race 17: 2027 ==
The 17th edition of the race is scheduled for 2027.
