= Naomi James =

New Zealand yacht racer (born 1949)

Dame Naomi James DBE
- Born: Naomi Christine Power; 2 March 1949 (age 77); New Zealand
- Citizenship: British
- Occupation: Ocean sailor
- Years active: 1977–1983
- Known for: First woman to sail solo around the globe via Cape Horn
- Spouse: Rob James

Dame Naomi Christine James, DBE (née Power; born 2 March 1949) is the first woman to have sailed single-handed (i.e. solo) around the world via Cape Horn, the second woman to have ever sailed solo around the world. She departed Dartmouth, Devon on 9 September 1977 and finished her voyage around the globe on 8 June 1978 after 272 days, thus improving Sir Francis Chichester's solo round-the-world sailing record by two days.

She was born in New Zealand on a landlocked sheep farm in the Hawkes Bay region and did not learn how to swim until the age of 23. She worked as a hairdresser until she boarded a passenger boat for Europe.

In the summer of 1975 in Saint-Malo, France she met her future husband Rob James, who was skippering yachts for Chay Blyth and who had come into port with a charter boat. She learned about sailing from Rob James, and while waiting for him to return from an ocean race and marry her, she made the decision to sail single-handed around the world, non-stop. She told Rob her dream on their honeymoon, and had only six-weeks sailing experience at the time. Chay Blyth lent her the boat Spirit of Cutty Sark (later renamed Express Crusader), other people raised money for supplies, and the Daily Express raised sponsorship money. She sailed around the world aboard the 53-foot (16 m) yacht Express Crusader. During her voyage, she once nearly lost her mast, capsized and had no radio for several weeks.

Naomi James was made a dame commander of the Order of the British Empire in 1979 in recognition of her achievements, and was named New Zealand 1978 Sailor of the Year.

She was the subject of This Is Your Life in 1979 when she was surprised by Eamonn Andrews at the Earls Court Boat Show.

After her voyage, she found a house with her husband in Cork Harbour, Ireland.

Naomi was reunited with the Express Crusader (fitted out and renamed Kriter Lady) for the 1980 Europe 1 STAR. She was the first woman back and broke the women's speed record for a single-handed crossing of the Atlantic, with a time of 25 days, 19 hours. Rob also competed in that race, finishing twelfth in the trimaran Boatfile.

In 1982, she and her husband Rob James sailed Colt Cars to win the two thousand mile double-handed Round Britain Race. She gave up sailing after that race, because she suffered badly from sea sickness during that voyage (possibly augmented by morning sickness due to her pregnancy). In 1983, while sailing in the same boat which won the race, her husband fell overboard and drowned off Salcombe, Devon. Her daughter was born 10 days later.

Dame Naomi was inducted into the New Zealand Sports Hall of Fame in 1990. She graduated with a MA in Philosophy from the University College Cork, and later a PhD from Milltown Institute of Theology and Philosophy.

== In context ==
Krystyna Chojnowska-Liskiewicz of Poland was the first woman to sail around the world solo, completing her 401-day voyage (via the Panama Canal) on 21 April 1978, less than two months before James, starting and finishing in the Canary Islands.

James' voyage is notable as she was the first woman to single-handedly sail the clipper route, eastabout and south of the three great capes; and she completed a fast (although not without outside assistance) circumnavigation in just 272 days. According to the rules of the World Sailing Speed Record Council, a circumnavigation of the globe for speed record purposes has to start and finish in the English Channel; James started and finished her voyage in Dartmouth, therefore fulfilling this condition.

In 1988, Kay Cottee of Australia became the first woman to complete a non-stop single-handed circumnavigation, on Blackmore's First Lady.

The first woman to sail around the world was Jeanne Baret, a French woman who, disguised as a man, sailed on the Etoile, one of the two ships on the French expedition led by Louis-Antoine de Bougainville. Baret was a herbalist and assisted in the identification of new species. The expedition left France in April 1768.

== Publications ==
- At one with the sea: alone around the world, Auckland, N.Z. : Hutchinson of New Zealand, 1979, 9780091368609
- At sea on land, London : Hutchinson/Stanley Paul, 1981,9780091446307
- Courage at sea: tales of heroic voyages, London : Stanley Paul, 1987, 9780091712501
