= Howard Blackburn =

Canadian-American fisherman

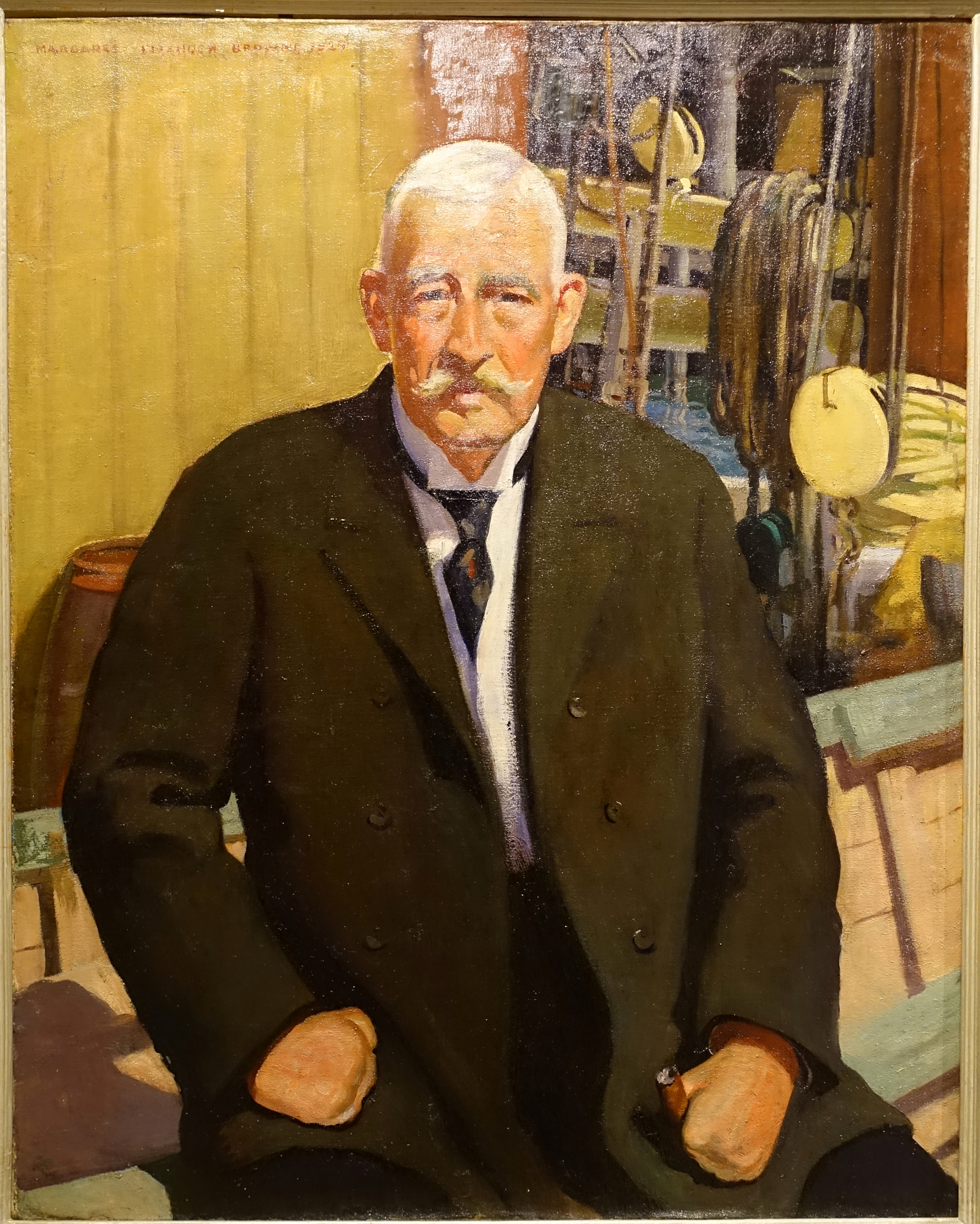
Howard Blackburn by Margaret Fitzhugh Browne, 1929

Howard Blackburn (1859–1932) was a Canadian American fisherman. Despite losing his fingers and toes to frostbite while lost at sea in a dory in 1883, he prospered as a Gloucester, Massachusetts businessman. Yearning for adventure, he twice sailed single-handed across the Atlantic Ocean, overcoming his disability and setting record times for the crossing.

== History ==
Howard Blackburn was born in Port Medway, Nova Scotia in 1859. At the age of 18, he moved south to Massachusetts, seeking work as a fisherman, and became part of the Gloucester, Massachusetts fishing community.

Blackburn first rose to fame in 1883. While he was fishing on the schooner Grace L. Fears, a sudden winter storm caught him and dorymate Thomas Welch unprepared while they were in their Banks dory, leaving them separated from the schooner. Blackburn began to row for shore, despite the loss of his mittens; he knew his hands would freeze, so he kept them in the hooked position that would allow him to row. He tried to save one hand with a sock and thus worsened his condition by freezing his toes and yet not being able to save his fingers. Welch gave up and lay down in the dory and died on the second day. Blackburn carried the body to shore for a proper burial.

After five days with virtually no food, water, or sleep, he made it to shore in Newfoundland. Blackburn's hands were treated for frostbite, but could not be saved; he lost all of his fingers, and many of his toes, and both thumbs to the first joint.

Blackburn returned to Gloucester a hero, and with the help of the town, managed to establish a successful saloon. Not content with this, he organised an expedition to the Klondike to join the gold rush; rather than go overland, he and his group sailed there, via Cape Horn. Howard, after a disagreement with his partners left the group in San Francisco after a short trip to Portland, Oregon to buy lumber to help finance the trip, and returned home never having panned for gold.

After the quest for gold failed, Blackburn turned his attention to a new challenge — to sail single-handed across the Atlantic Ocean. This had been done before, by Alfred "Centennial" Johnson in 1876, and Joshua Slocum had completed a single-handed circumnavigation in 1898; but for a man with no fingers to undertake such a voyage would be quite an accomplishment. He sailed from Gloucester, Massachusetts in 1899, in the modified Gloucester Fishing Sloop, Great Western, and reached the city of Gloucester, England after 62 days at sea.

Returning to Gloucester, Massachusetts, Blackburn continued to prosper as a businessman; but he still hankered for adventure. In 1901, he sailed to Portugal in the twenty-five-foot Gloucester Fishing sloop Great Republic, making the trip in 39 days. In 1903 he again set out alone, this time in the sailing dory America, but was defeated by bad weather. Blackburn also circumnavigated the Eastern United States by going down the Mississippi River and back up the Eastern Seaboard. The Sloop "Great Republic" and the Dory "America" may be seen at the Cape Ann Museum, in Gloucester.

Blackburn died in 1932; his funeral was attended by many of the people of Gloucester. He was buried in the Fishermen's Rest section of Beechbrook Cemetery. Musician Allen Estes recorded the song Not With Ya Hands which tells Blackburn's story.

== Memorial race ==
Today, the Blackburn Challenge is held annually. It is a 20-mile open-water race circumnavigating Cape Ann open to all human-powered craft. July 15, 2023 was the 36th running of the Blackburn Challenge.

== Blackburn Tavern still stands ==
The building that was the home of the Blackburn Tavern still stands at 289 Main Street in Gloucester. Vincent Cove that at high tide came to the back door of the tavern has since been filled in but the building is largely unchanged.
