= Alfred "Centennial" Johnson =

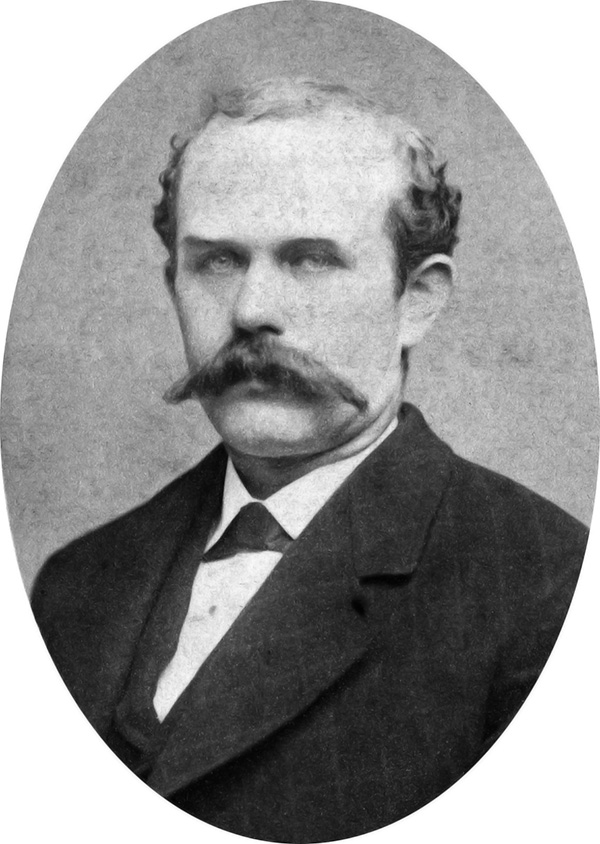
- Alfred "Centennial" Johnson, in 1876
- Born: Alfred Johnsen; 4 December 1846; Denmark
- Died: 1927, age 80 or 81
- Occupation: Fisherman
- Known for: First recorded single-handed crossing of the Atlantic Ocean

Alfred "Centennial" Johnson (1846–1927) was a Danish-born fisherman from Gloucester, Massachusetts. In 1876, in a 20-foot (6.1 m) sailing dory, he made the first recorded single-handed crossing of the Atlantic Ocean, landing at Abercastle in west Wales as a celebration of the first centennial of the United States. Local author Rob Morris has written a book about the crossing called Alfred "Centennial" Johnson.

Johnson's dory, Centennial, is now in the collection of the Cape Ann Museum in Gloucester, Massachusetts. It is frequently displayed alongside Howard Blackburn's sloop Great Republic, a vessel which was also used in a single-handed trans-Atlantic crossing.

== Conception ==
Alfred Johnson (sometimes spelled Johnsen) was born in Denmark on December 4, 1846. He had run away to sea as a teenager, and after working on sailing ships eventually ended up as a fisherman in Gloucester, Massachusetts. One day in 1874, he and some friends were playing cards and discussing the possibility of a single-handed Atlantic crossing, when Johnson declared that not only would such a crossing be possible, but that it could be carried out in an open dory — and that he could do it. When his friends scoffed, Johnson set out to prove them wrong.

Johnson planned to carry out his voyage as a celebration of the first centennial of the United States; his aim was to sail to Liverpool, hoping to make the 3,000-mile journey in under 90 days. He bought a 20-foot (6.1 m) dory, named her Centennial, and prepared and provisioned her for sea. She was fitted out with a centreboard, to improve her sailing qualities, and three watertight compartments which would help her float if capsized, until she could be righted.

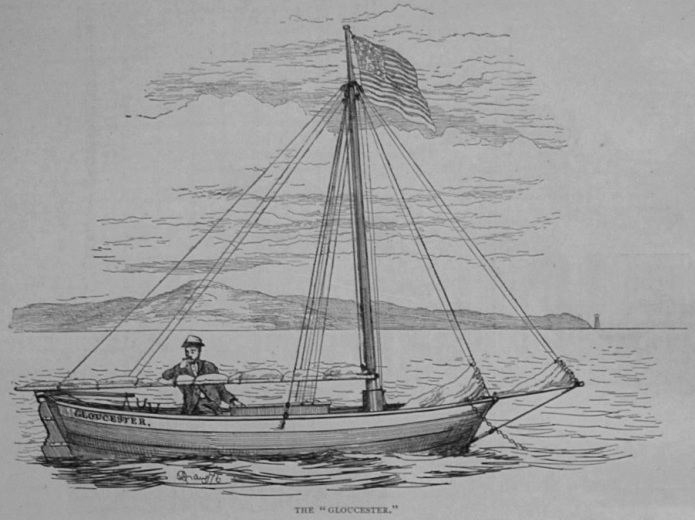
The Gloucester (as it was also known in England) with Mr. Johnson at the helm, from the Illustrated Sporting and Dramatic News of 1876

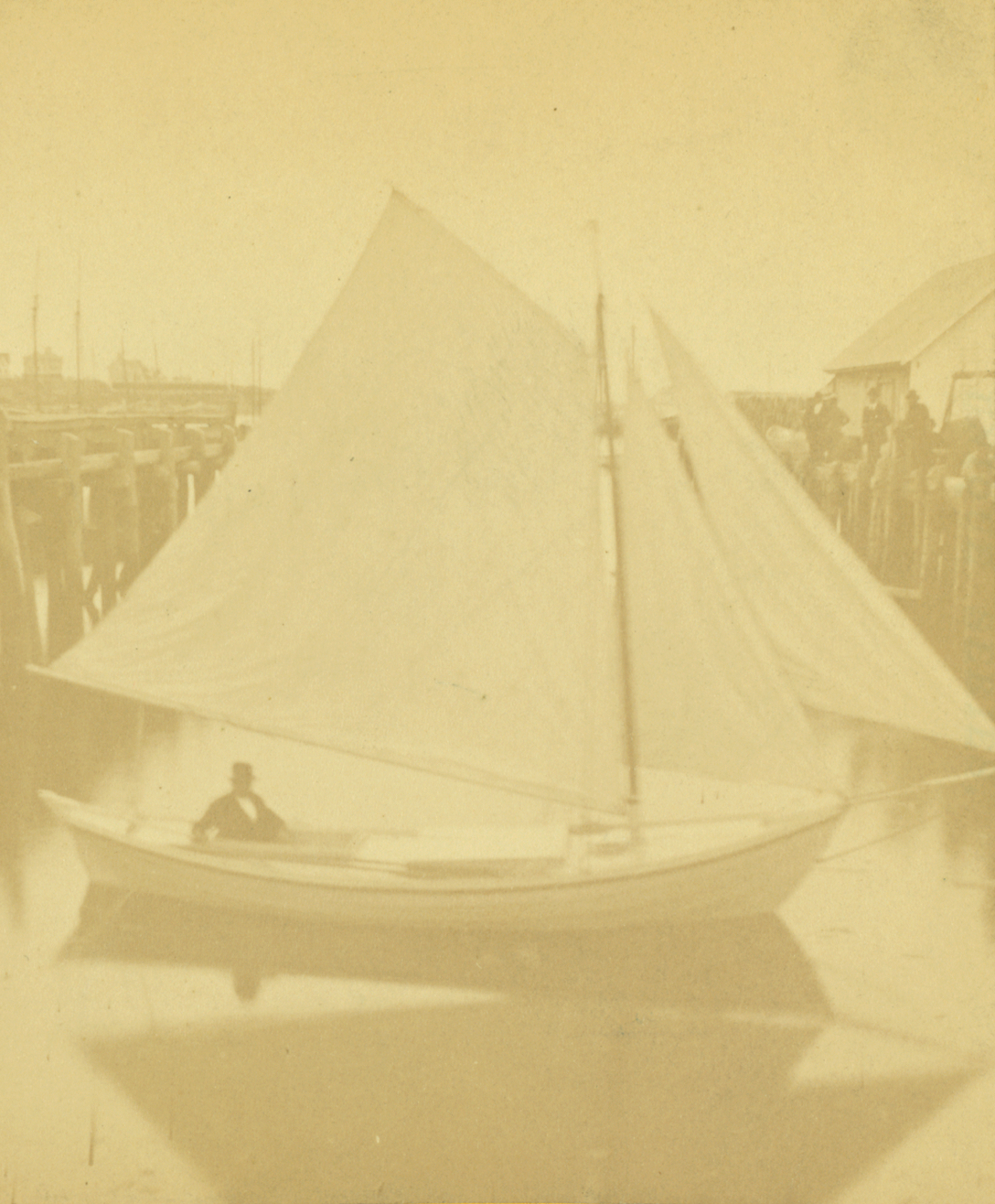
The sailing dory Centennial with Johnson at helm in Gloucester harbor

== The voyage ==
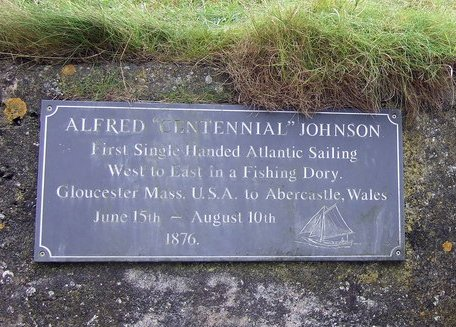
Alfred Johnson plaque

Johnson sailed on the crossing on June 15, 1876. He stopped briefly in Nova Scotia to make some adjustments to his ballast, then set off into the open ocean around June 25. He was sighted by several ships along the way, most of which attempted to rescue him, only to be astonished when he refused. At one time, he received a gift of two bottles of rum from a passing ship.

Johnson managed an average pace of about 70 miles (110 km) a day, quite respectable for such a small boat in the open sea, and survived a major gale which capsized the boat. Against the odds, he finally made landfall at Abercastle, a small port in Wales, on Saturday, August 12. After two days' rest, he finished his voyage by sailing into Liverpool on August 21, 1876, to an enthusiastic reception.

Johnson received some attention for his feat, and his boat was exhibited in Liverpool for several months; he was thereafter known as Alfred "Centennial" Johnson. When asked late in life why he had done it, he said "I made that trip because I was a damned fool, just as they said I was."

Johnson's voyage was the first recorded single-handed crossing of the Atlantic, and perhaps the first major single-handed passage carried out in the spirit of adventure.
