= Krystyna Chojnowska-Liskiewicz =

Polish yacht racer (1936–2021)

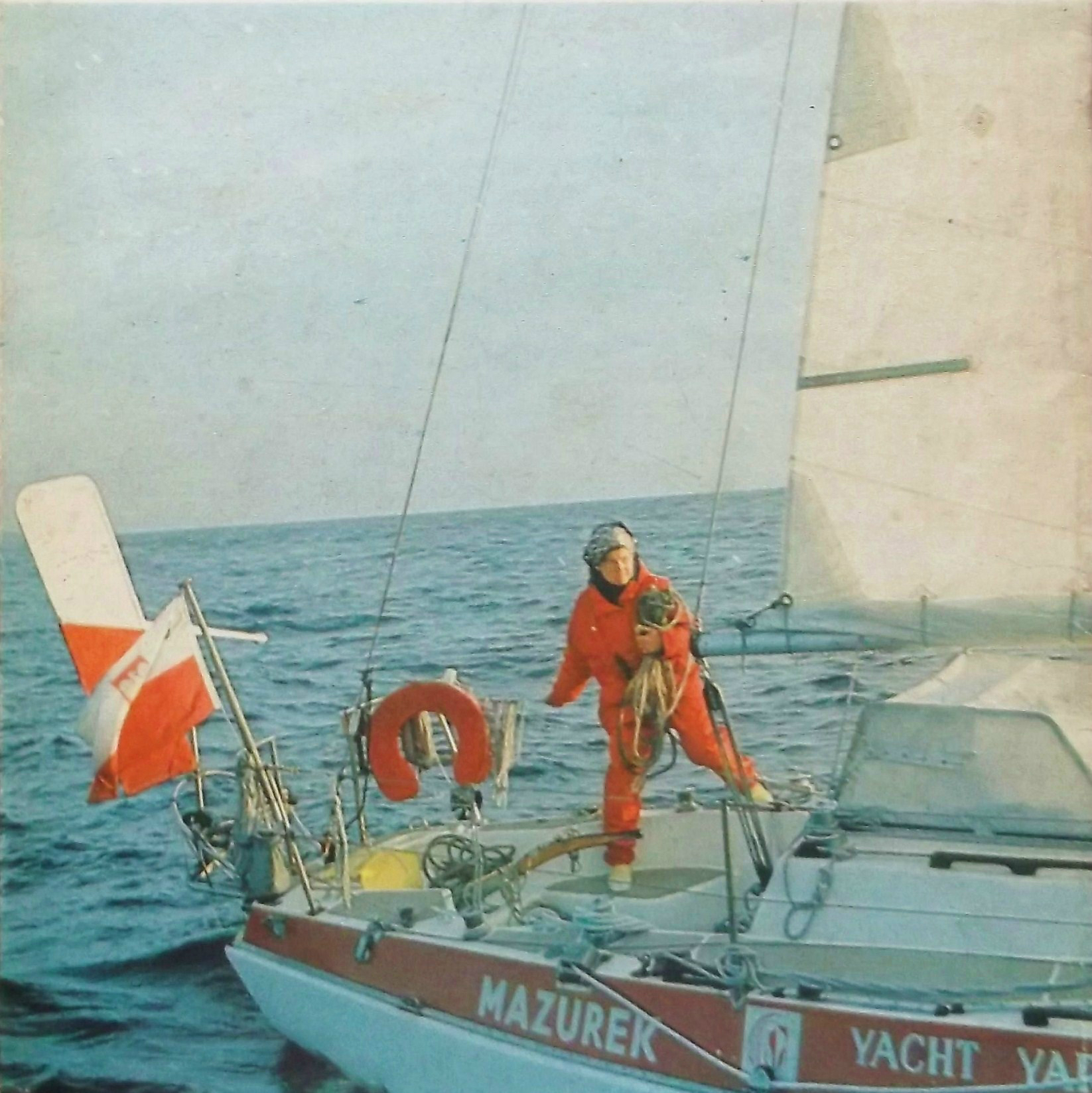
- Chojnowska-Liskiewicz on the yacht Mazurek in c. 1979
- Born: 15 July 1936; Warsaw, Poland
- Died: 13 June 2021 (aged 84); Gdańsk, Poland
- Education: Gdańsk University of Technology
- Occupation: Naval engineer
- Known for: first woman sailing around the globe single handed

Krystyna Chojnowska-Liskiewicz (15 July 1936 – 13 June 2021) was a Polish naval engineer and sailor. She was the first woman to have sailed single-handed (i.e. solo) around the world, repeating the late nineteenth century accomplishment of Joshua Slocum. She sailed from the Canary Islands on 28 March 1976 and completed her solo circumnavigation near the Cape Verde Islands on 20 March 1978, having covered approximately 28,696 nautical miles (53,133 km) over the course of 723 days.

== Early life and education ==
Krystyna Chojnowska was born in Warsaw, Poland on 15 July 1936. After the Second World War her family moved to Ostróda where she had her first experiences of sailing on Lake Drwęckie. She studied naval engineering in the Faculty of Shipbuilding at Gdańsk University of Technology, supervised by Professor Roman Lipowicz [pl], a specialist in ship board refrigeration systems. She graduated in 1960. She met her husband, Wacław Liskiewicz at the same university. He was also professionally involved in ship design and the couple were avid sailors. In 1957, while still a student, she earned her helmsman's license, and in 1960 achieved her sea helmsman's license. In 1966, she was awarded her yacht captain's license.

== Engineering career ==
After graduating, Chojnowska-Liskiewicz worked as a designer at the Gdańsk Shipyard, Centralnym Biurze Konstrukcji Okrętowych nr 1 (Central Ship Design Office No. 1), and the Centralnym Ośrodku Konstrukcyjno-Badawczym (Central Design and Research Center). She was involved in construction supervision and designed on-board systems and equipment for ships built at the Gdańsk Shipyard. She primarily designed cargo handling equipment with a lifting capacity of 3.0 to 100 tons. She also designed a mooring system for the first Panamax ship built in Poland.

== Sailing ==
In 1967, Chojnowska-Liskiewicz was a member of the first crew and captain of the first leg (Hel–Ustka) of the yacht “Swarożyc III” from the Academic Maritime Club (Akademicki Związek Morski) which sailed to Spitsbergen. In 1971, she organised a women's cruise on the Baltic Sea on the yacht “Szmaragd,” and in 1972, she sailed to Scotland on the same yacht with a female crew.

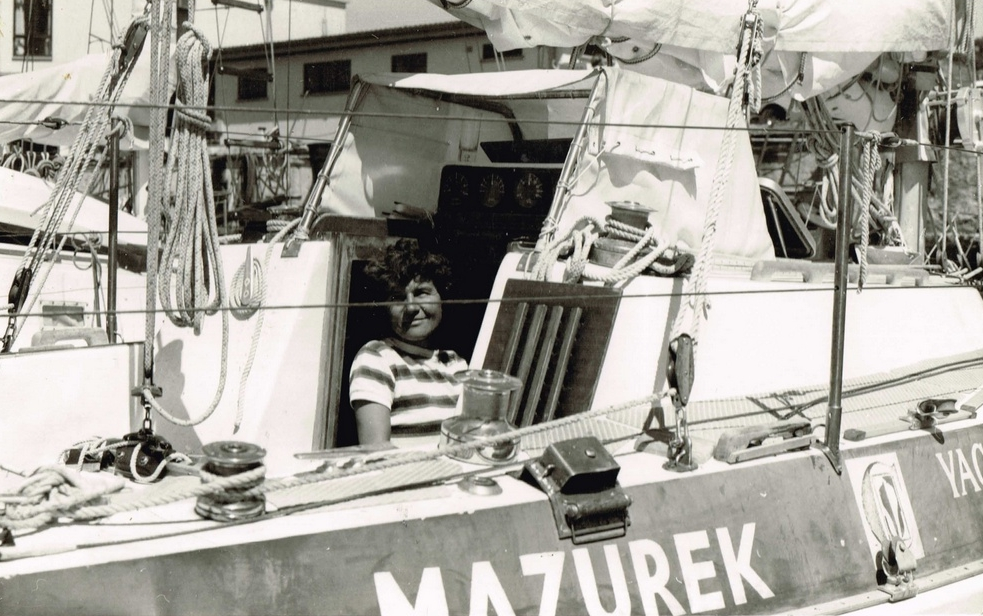
Krystyna Chojnowska-Liskiewicz on board the "Mazurek”

== The boat ==
Between 1976 and 1978, she sailed solo around the world aboard the yacht Mazurek, designed by her husband, Wacław Liskiewicz, who was Head of the Design Office at the shipyard in Gdańsk Yacht where the vessel was built. The yacht was named “Mazurek” in a public competition run on Polish Radio.

Krystyna Chojnowska-Liskiewicz carried out her westabout (east to west) voyage on Mazurek, a Conrad 32 sloop built in Poland. Mazurek was 9.51 metres (31.2 ft) long, with a beam of 2.70metres (8.86 ft) and a sail area of 35 square metres (376.7 ft^{2}). Mazurek's construction team was headed by Chojnowska-Liskiewicz's husband, Wacław Liskiewicz.

== The voyage ==
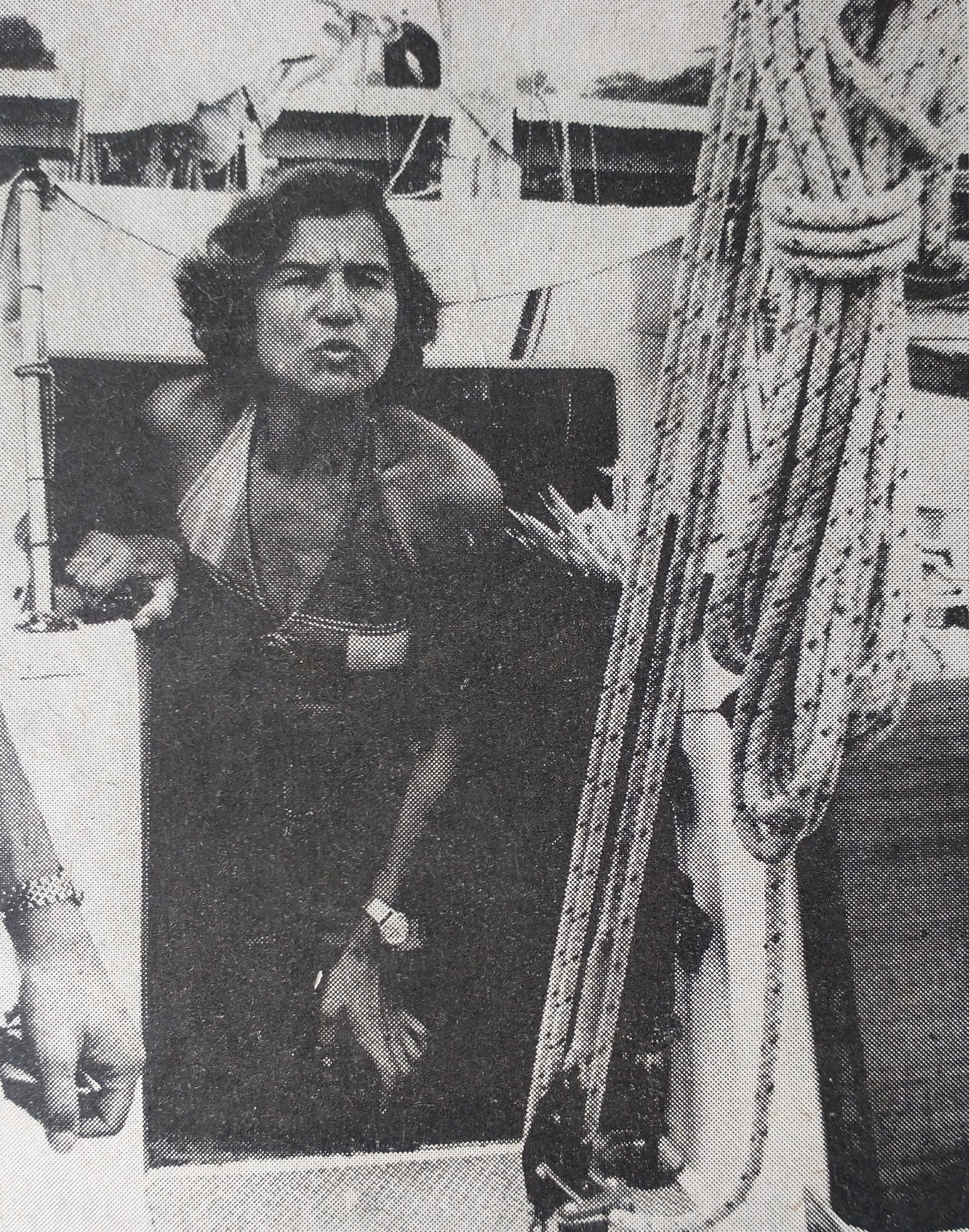
Krystyna Chojnowska-Liskiewicz in 1978

Chojnowska-Liskiewicz set sail from the Canary Islands on 28 February 1976, crossing the Atlantic Ocean to Barbados. She then sailed through the Caribbean Sea to the Panama Canal, and hence to the Pacific Ocean.

After crossing the Pacific, Chojnowska-Liskiewicz sailed via Tahiti and Fiji to Australia, and then west across the Indian Ocean via Mauritius. After passing the Cape of Good Hope, she sailed north, and crossed her outbound track on 20 March 1978 at latitude 16° 08.5' north and longitude 35° 50' west.

Chojnowska-Liskiewicz completed her voyage when she entered the port of Las Palmas de Gran Canaria on 21 April 1978, having sailed 31,166 nautical miles (57,719 km) in 401 days. On 18 June 1978, she returned to Poland, mooring the “Mazurek” on the Motława River, to a hero's welcome. After a period of relative obscurity, she has once more been acclaimed as a national hero.

== Other contenders for the title ==
In completing her voyage, Chojnowska-Liskiewicz only narrowly beat Naomi James, who completed her own single-handed circumnavigation on 8 June 1978. James' voyage is itself notable, however; she completed a fast (although not non-stop) circumnavigation in just 272 days, thus improving on Sir Francis Chichester's solo round-the-world sailing record by two days. She also became the first woman to single-handedly sail the clipper route, eastabout and south of the three great capes, starting and finishing in the English Channel (a requirement for speed records).

In 1988, Kay Cottee of Australia became the first woman to complete a non-stop single-handed circumnavigation, on Blackmore's First Lady.

== Post voyage, recognition and later career ==
Chojnowska-Liskiewicz was awarded a gold medal “For Outstanding Sporting Achievements”, received an entry in the Guinness Book of Records and was a recipient of the Slocum Award in the solo sailors category of the Slocum Society. She was also initiated into The Explorers Club in New York.

After completing her record breaking voyage, Chojnowska-Liskiewicz travelled around Poland for the next two years encouraging young people to take up the sport of sailing. In 1981 she took a job at the Radunia Ship Yard, and then worked at the Centrum Techniki Okrętowej (Centre for Naval Technology) in Gdańsk until her retirement. She worked in standardisation and was the author of a number of industry standard guidelines. Whilst at the CTO, she oversaw implementation of EN and ISO ship standards into the Polish standardisation system, required as part of the agreements through which Poland joined the European Union in 2004.

In 2001, Chojnowska-Liskiewicz organised an Open Women's Sailing Championship called “Beauties of the Baltic Sea.” In 2008, on the 30th anniversary of her round-the-world voyage, she was honoured with the Super Kolosa Prize for a lifetime achievements in sailing. In 2015, she received the title of Sailor of the 50th Anniversary of the Pomorskiego Związku Żeglarskiego (Pomeranian Sailing Association) (PoZŻ), and in 2017, the Medal for Special Services to Pomeranian Sailing. On 28 March 2021 (the 45th anniversary of the start of her round-the-world voyage), the PoZŻ Regional Council granted her honorary membership. In May 2004, she was made an honorary citizen of Ostróda, and a square in that city was named after her in 2020.

Krystyna Chojnowska-Liskiewicz died on 13 June 2021 and was buried at the Srebrzysko cemetery.

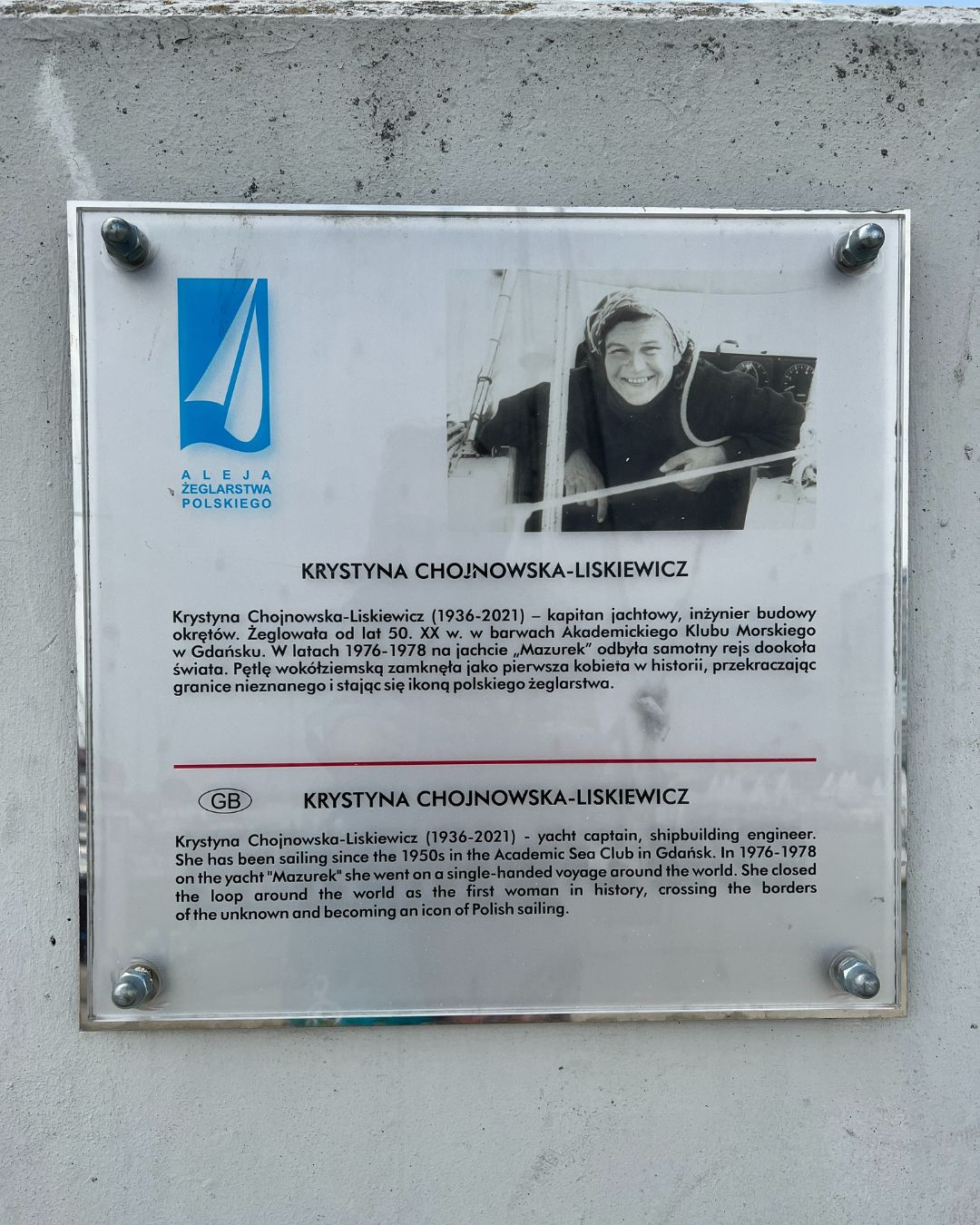
Memorial plaque to Krystyna Chojnowska-Liskiewicz in Alei Żeglarstwa Polskiego in Gdynia

== Legacy ==
On 8 October 2022, in the presence of her husband, a posthumous commemorative plaque was unveiled in Chojnowska-Liskiewicz's honour. In May 2023, a marina in Gdańsk-Górki Zachodnie has been named after her and a plaque commemorating the yacht “Mazurek” was unveiled at the marina quay on Szafarnia Street. After being purchased from a private owner, the yacht Mazurek became the property of the Narodowego Muzeum Morskiego (Polish National Maritime Museum) in Gdańsk and has served as a training yacht. The museum also holds objects donated by Chojnowska-Liskiewicz from her famous voyage, including the white and red fin of the self-steering rudder, decorated with musical notation of the Polish national anthem, a PZŻ sports flag, a handmade flag of Mauritius, and a decorative map of Gran Canaria, received in Las Palmas at the end of her voyage.

== Orders ==
- Polonia Restituta Commander's Cross

== Bibliography ==
- (in Polish) Krystyna Chojnowska-Liskiewicz – Polish Sailing Encyclopedia
