= Abercastle =

Village in Pembrokeshire, Wales

Coordinates: 51.957914°N 5.122736°W

Abercastle: Welsh: Abercastell
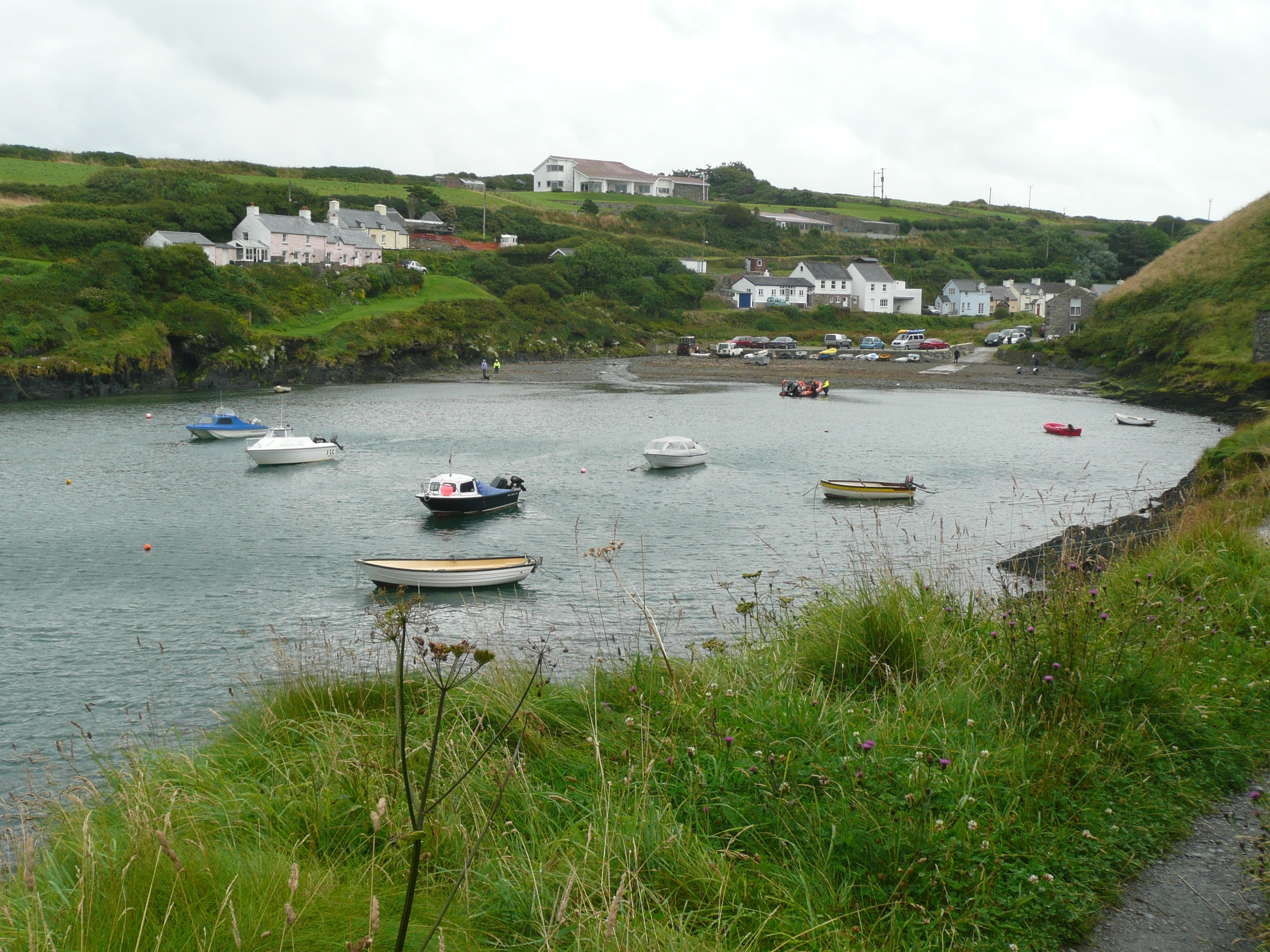

- Location within Pembrokeshire
- Principal area: Pembrokeshire
- Country: Wales
- Sovereign state: United Kingdom
- Post town: Haverfordwest
- Postcode district: SA62
- Police: Dyfed-Powys
- Fire: Mid and West Wales
- Ambulance: Welsh
- UK Parliament: Preseli Pembrokeshire
- Senedd Cymru – Welsh Parliament: Preseli Pembrokeshire

Abercastle (Welsh: Abercastell) is a village in Pembrokeshire, Wales. Abercastle has a working harbour which is managed by Abercastle Boat Owners Association.

In 1876, The harbour was the landing-site of the first Atlantic Ocean single-handed sailing, west-to-east, starting from Gloucester, Massachusetts, by Alfred "Centennial" Johnson.

== History ==
Abercastle is an old trading harbour which exported local slate and grain, limestone, butter, honey, corn, and some coal. There are also the remains of nineteenth century limekilns.

== Alfred Johnson memorial ==
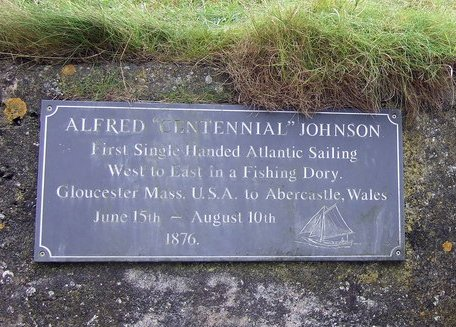
Alfred Johnson plaque

Alfred Johnson landed at Abercastle on Saturday, August 12, 1876, after 66 days sailing from Gloucester, Massachusetts, becoming the first person to make the single-handed Atlantic crossing. Johnson, a Danish born fisherman used a small dory named 'Centennial'. He managed an average pace of about 70 miles (110 km) a day, quite respectable for such a small boat in the open sea, and survived a gale which capsized the boat.

A plaque made of Welsh Slate is on the quay wall near the slipway and was unveiled by Alfred Johnson's grandson, Charlie Dickman on 17 October 2003. Local author Rob Morris has also written a book about the crossing called Alfred "Centennial" Johnson. St Davids poet Tony Davies also dedicated the following to Alfred Johnson:

Sixty six days, three thousand miles,
Record breaking, Abercastle smiles,
Liverpool, trip complete,
The courage of Captain Johnson and Centennial’s feat.

== Carreg Samson ==
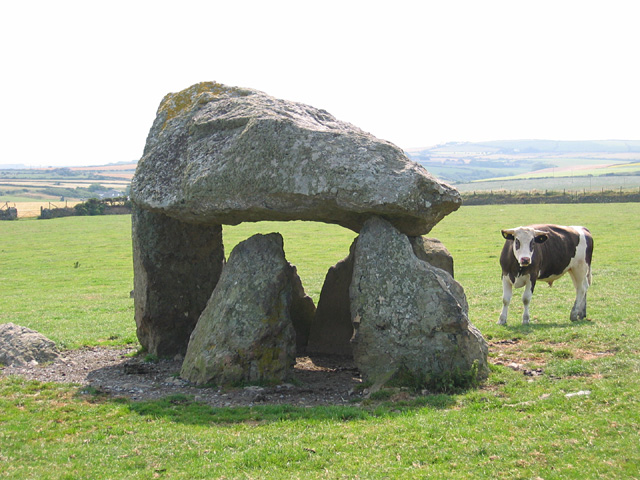
Carreg Samson

Carreg Samson, also known as 'Carreg Sampson', Samson's Stone and the 'Longhouse' is a 5,000-year-old Neolithic Burial Chamber and the site of over 1,000 burials. Half a mile west of the Abercastle near the Pembrokeshire Coast Path, it has a cap stone 15 feet long and 9 feet wide supported on three of the seven upright stones. It is thought to have been a portal dolmen and was built over a pit. It is called 'Samson' because of a local legend that Samson placed it in position with his little finger. The whole burial chamber was once covered by a mound of earth or stones and once these were removed stones were used to block the holes in the sides of the tomb so that it could be used as a shelter for sheep. Excavations in 1968 found an early Neolithic bowl.

== Facilities ==
The harbour faces northwest and is therefore sheltered from south-westerly gales, providing a safe haven for the local fishing fleet. There is a public telephone and free parking for a small number of cars. The slipway goes to soft sand and is not suitable for non off-road vehicles. The coastal bus “The Strumble Shuttle” calls at Abercastle.

== Activities ==
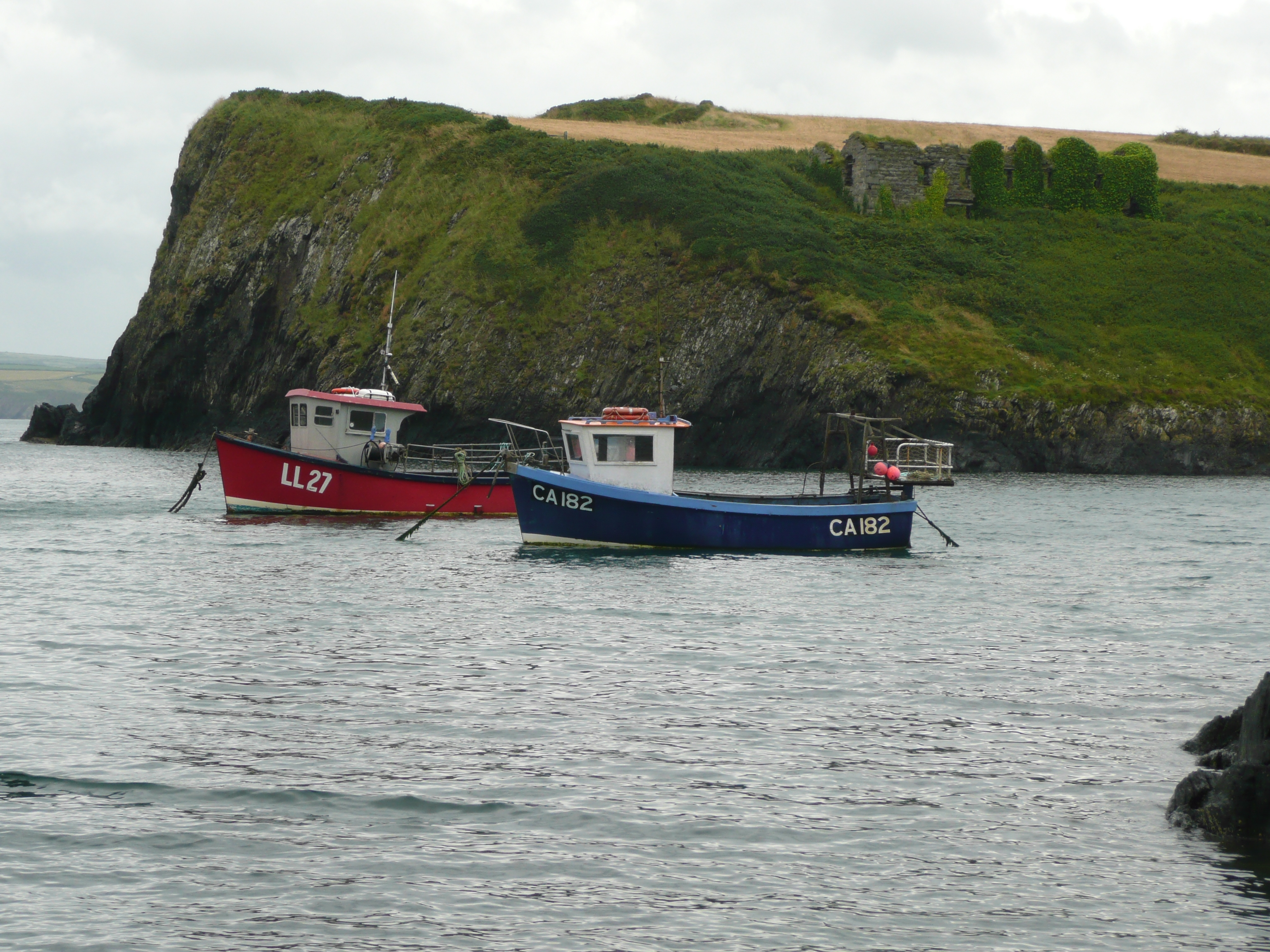
Fishing boats at Abercastle

Popular for fishing and diving, there are also several recorded climbing sites in the area although they are suitable for group use. The harbour is a good launching site for sea kayaking. The coastal path that follows the coast of Pembrokeshire passes through Abercastle, and is popular with tourists and local walking groups.

== Shipwreck ==
The 3,800 ton wreck of SS Leysian lies on the west side of the harbour, about 50m from the cliffs. She ran aground and sank a few months later in 1917 with no loss of life. As it is at a depth of around 15m the wreck is popular with divers who report much wreckage, and a large range of fish, including a large pollock which lives in the wreck. A detailed survey of the wreck began in June 2019.

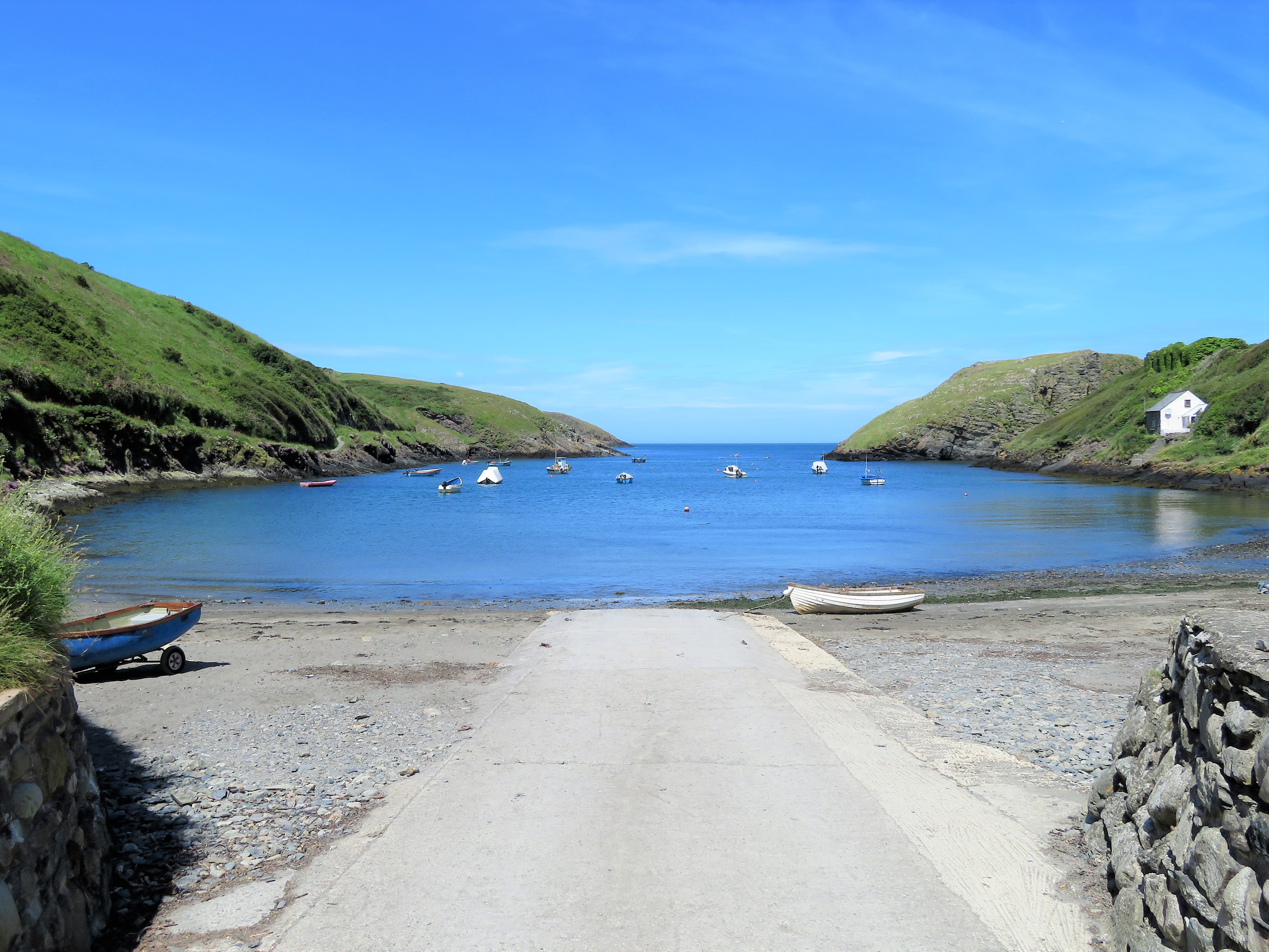
The harbour

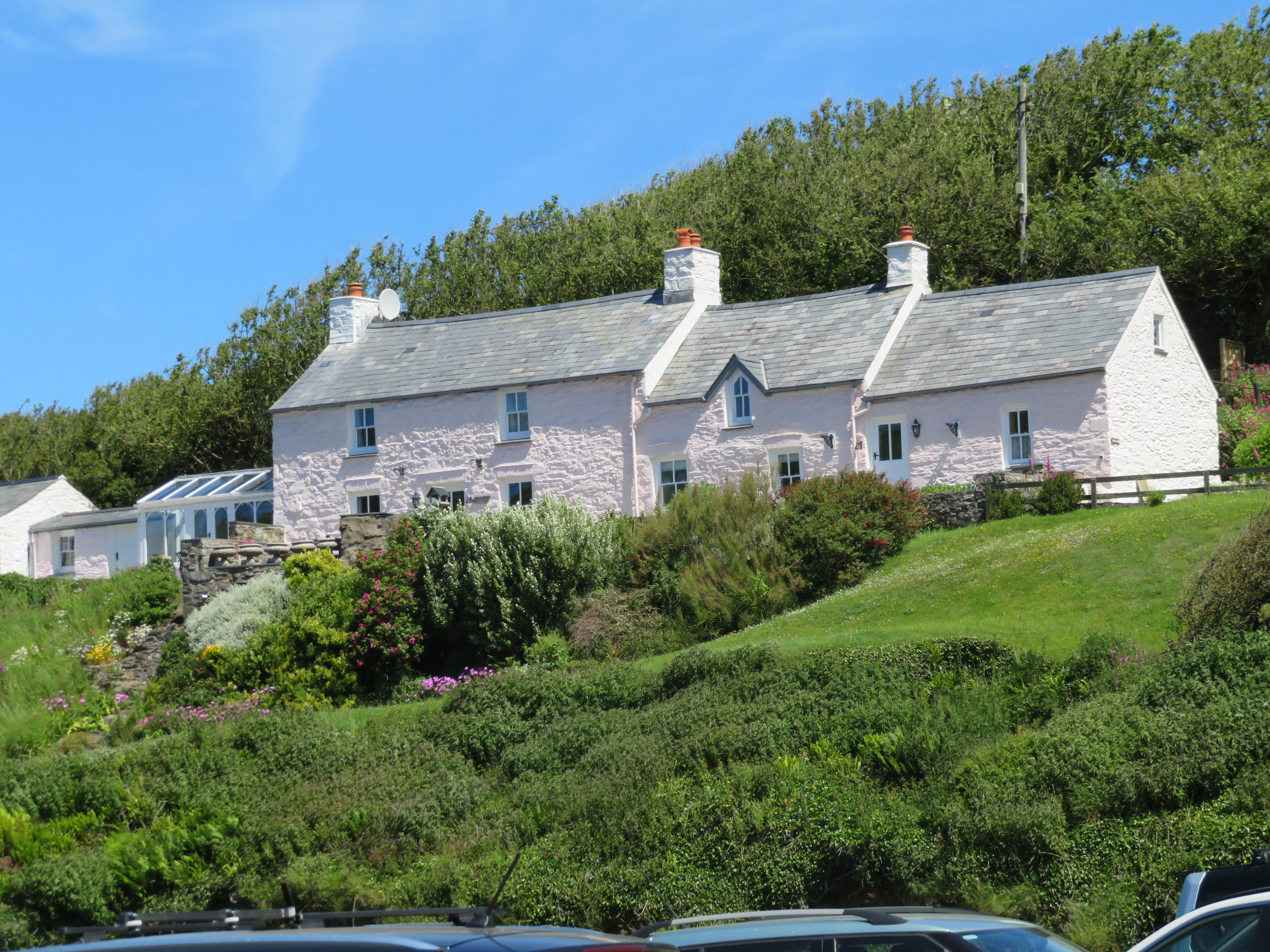
A cottage overlooking the harbour

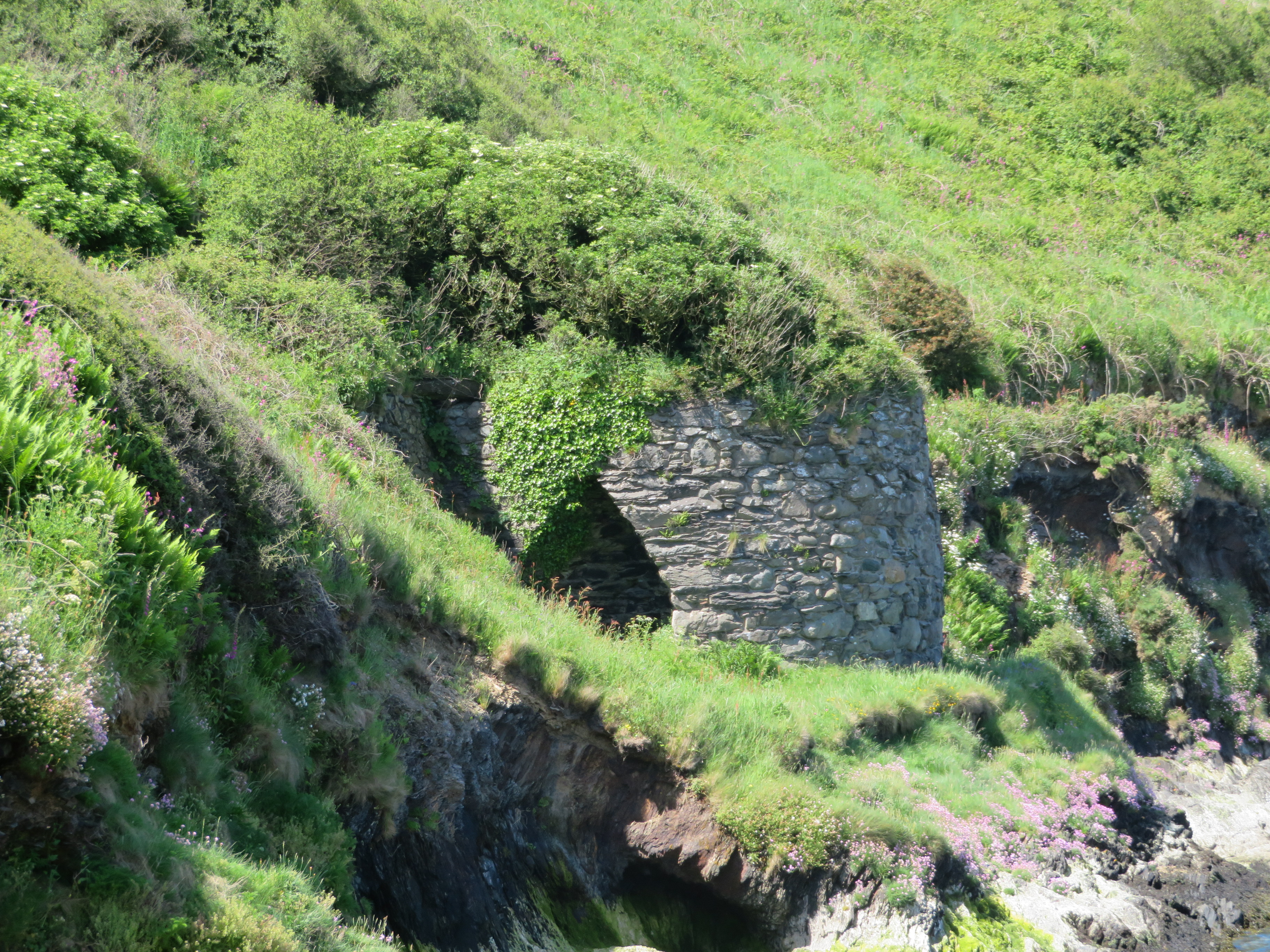
A lime kiln

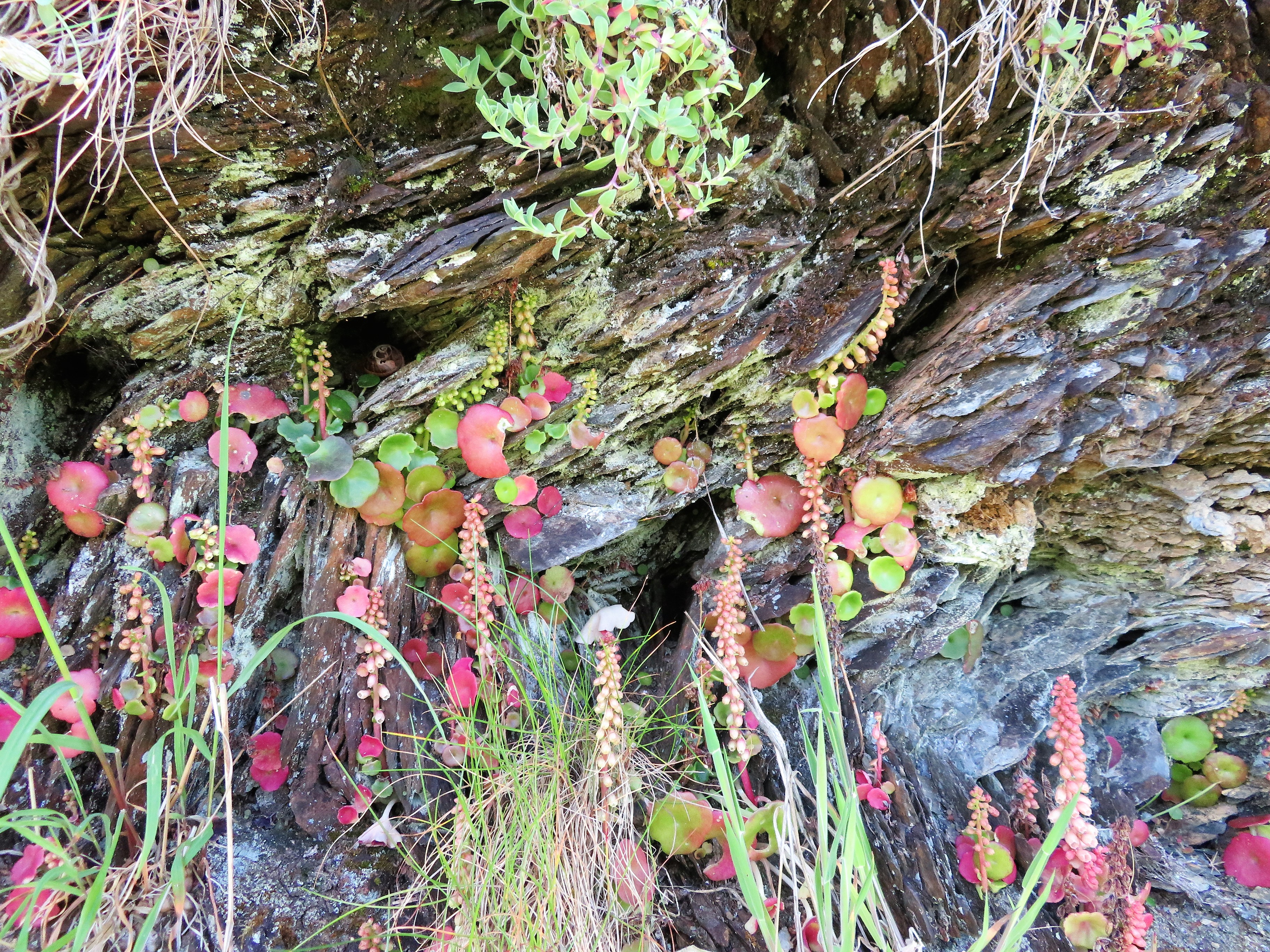
Plants near the harbour wall path

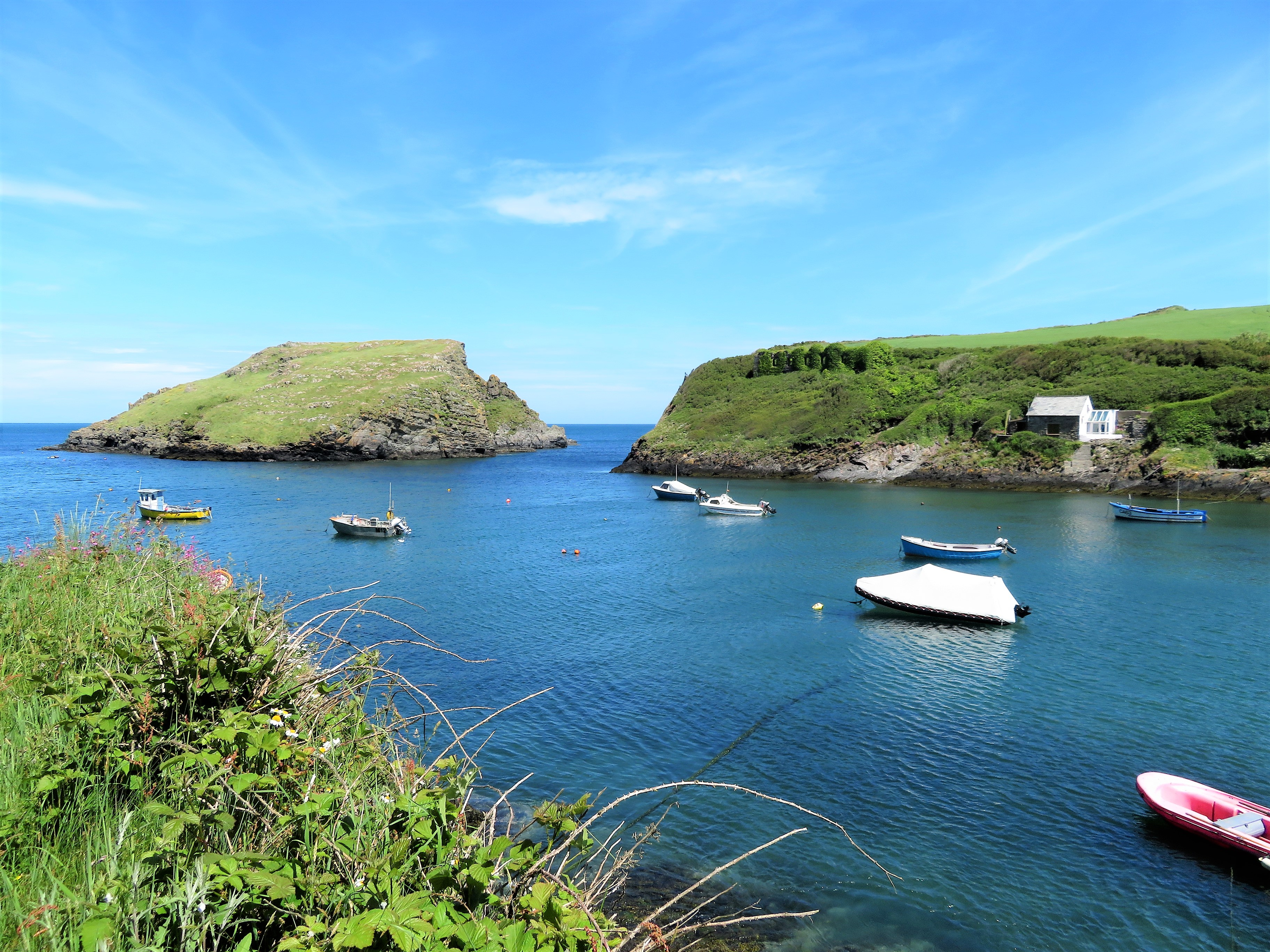
Ynys y Castell

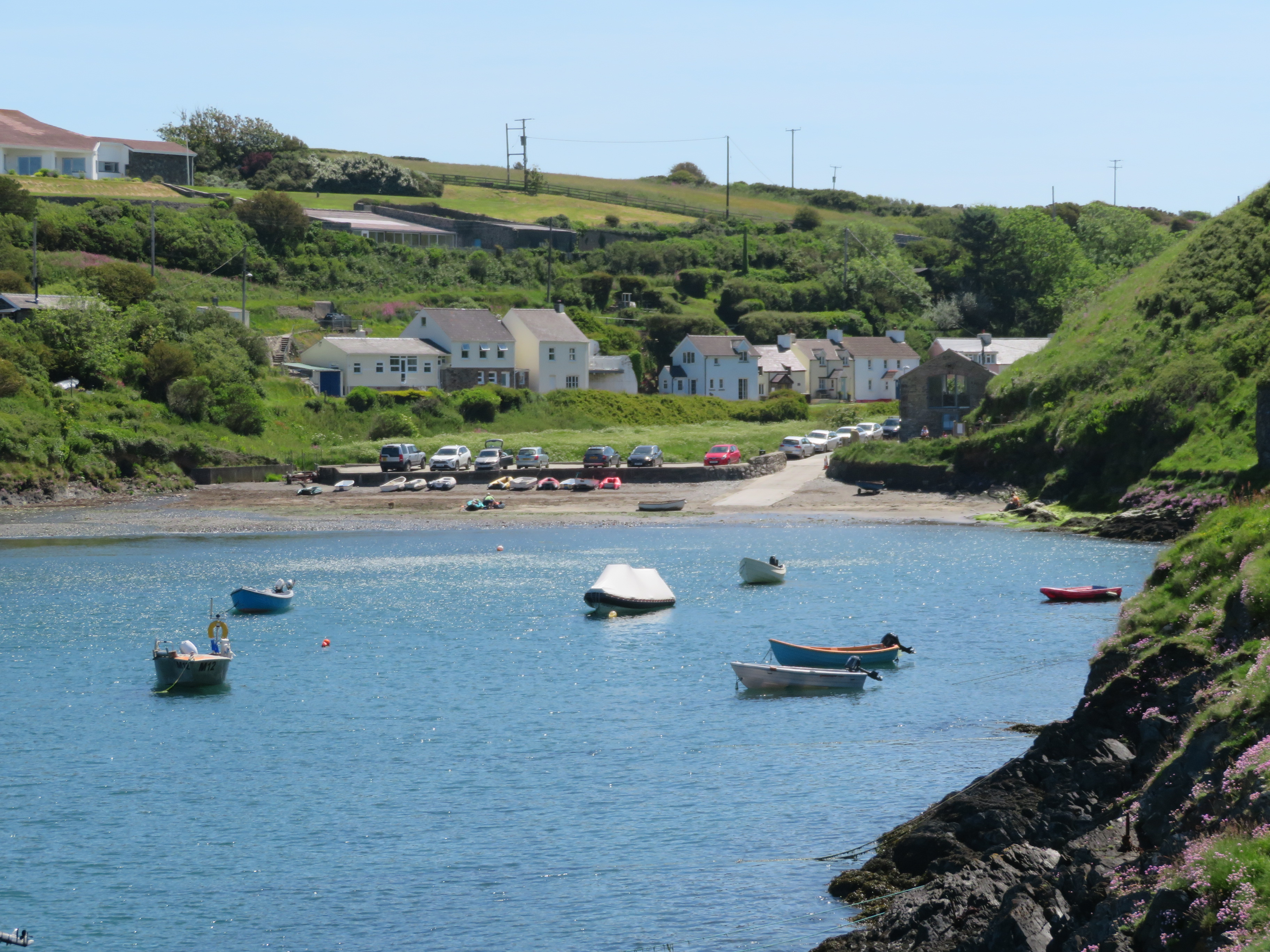
Looking towards the village
