= Single-handed sailing =

Sailing with one person on board

The sport and practice of single-handed sailing or solo sailing is sailing with only one crewmember (i.e., only one person on board the vessel). The term usually refers to ocean and long-distance sailing and is used in competitive sailing and among cruisers.

== Terminology ==
In sailing, a hand is a member of a ship's crew. "Single-handed" therefore means with a crew of one, i.e., only one person on the vessel. The term "single-handed" is also used more generally in English to mean "done without help from others" or, literally, "with one hand".

In the sailing community, the term "crewed" (or sometimes "fully-crewed") is used to mean sailing with a crew of more than one, in order to distinguish events permitting larger crews from their single-handed equivalents (even though a solo sailor is also correctly referred to as a vessel's crew). Hence, for example, "Bruno Peyron ... has taken part in almost all the large crewed and single-handed sailing events since the 80's." In contrast, the term "double-handed" is used to refer to sailing with two persons on board.

Many significant voyages, such as ocean passages, have been made single-handed, and many single-handed circumnavigations have been accomplished. "Single-handed" does not imply "non-stop", so a single-handed circumnavigation counts as such even with stops, as in Joshua Slocum's voyage.

== Sailing alone ==
=== The racing scene ===
Single-handed sailing has become a major competitive sport, and there are a number of prominent single-handed offshore races. The Single-Handed Trans-Atlantic Race (OSTAR) and the Route du Rhum are trans-Atlantic single-handed races. The single handed transpac (SHTP) starts off Tiburon in the San Francisco Bay, and ends in Hanalei Bay, Kauai. Round-the-world yacht racing began with the single-handed Sunday Times Golden Globe Race. Two modern round-the-world races descended from this event are the Velux 5 Oceans Race (Around Alone), which is run in several stages with stops in between, and the Vendée Globe, a non-stop race around the world and perhaps the ultimate event in single-handed sailing. Many single-handed races make use of Open 50 and Open 60 boats.

Stringent rules apply to single-handed races and speed records. As with any sailing race, the voyage must be completed under sail, and the boat must be operated and powered by wind and muscle-power alone (no electric or hydraulic winches). Some races are carried out in stages, where repairs and resupply may be carried out at the intermediate ports of call; in non-stop races and record attempts, no outside assistance is permitted, whether in the form of a tow, repairs, or supplies. However, anchoring to make repairs under one's own resources is generally permitted.

In terms of safety, very stringent entry requirements apply to major races. The crew must meet requirements for both past experience and training, and the vessel and equipment must meet specified standards.

One issue that arises with single-handed round-the-world racing is that of verifying that the competitor has actually sailed around the world. In practice, faking such a voyage, along with all of the detailed logs, workings of celestial navigation sights, radio check-ins at various places, and so on, would be virtually impossible; however, in the Golden Globe Race, one competitor did actually attempt this. Today, racers in major offshore races are required to carry location beacons, such as Inmarsat-C with GPS, or the Argos System; these beacons report each boat's position continuously to race headquarters. This is primarily for safety, and to permit daily race reports; however, it also means there is a verifiable record of the competitor's route.

=== Requirements ===
Complete competence with sailing and seamanship are required for single-handing, as is a high degree of self-sufficiency. Physical fitness is of particular importance for single-handing, as all of the tasks which would ordinarily be handled by two or more persons must be accomplished by the single sailor. This includes often arduous sail adjustments and sail changes in all weathers, including heavy weather (very windy or stormy weather).

This is true many times over for competitive sailors; for example, Ellen MacArthur's Kingfisher monohull, in which she completed the 2000 Vendée Globe, has an upwind sail area of 237 m^{2} (2,550 sq ft), as compared to a conservative recreational round-the-world yacht such as a Westsail 32, which has a sail area of only 59 m^{2} (640 sq ft), despite these two boats having virtually the same displacement (weight), at around 9,000 kilograms (20,000 lb). With all sail handling being by the muscle power of one person, this huge sail area directly translates to physical effort, and the much greater power-to-weight ratio makes handling the boat a greater physical challenge. In addition, while a recreational sailor might wait for a while before reacting to a change in conditions, a racer will respond to every wind shift with a sail adjustment or change, resulting in much more frequent exertions.

=== Hazards ===
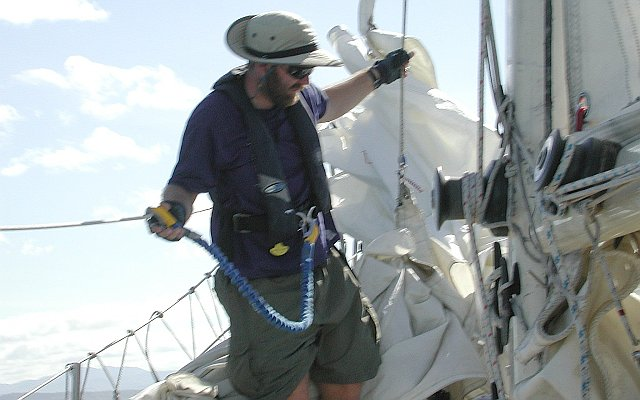
A sailor tethered to the boat for safety as he reefs sails.

Falling overboard while single-handed ocean sailing is almost certainly fatal, as there is no one to attempt to recover the crewmember who has fallen overboard. However, the nightmare scenario of floating in mid-ocean while watching one's boat sail away under auto-pilot makes many single-handers very cautious. Staying on the boat (by careful and thorough use of handholds, lifelines, and tethers) is widely regarded as the best approach for any sailor, but some single-handers tow a rope astern, as a last desperate chance if they should fall overboard. Modern technology has given us EPIRB, PLB, SART Radar SART and AIS SART devices which can help recover victims of a man overboard (MOB) incident. Additionally the most modern autopilot systems eg NKE Gyropilot have – or can have added as a retro-fit option – remote control handsets which not only allows the autopilot to be remotely controlled from anywhere on the boat but also detects when an individual carrying/wearing one goes over board, sounding the alarm and, depending on type of installation and mode selected, either turning the boat into the wind or locking the rudder hard over on the opposite tack causing the yacht to stall/fore reach, in both cases preventing the boat from continuing on its route and allowing a conscious MOB the possibility of getting back aboard. Falling overboard while single handed sailing also creates a hazard to navigation for all other vessels as the now-uncontrolled vessel can remain afloat for an extended period.

One of the factors that influence single handed sailing operations is the management of sleep deprivation due to the constant need for monitoring the situation. Numerous single sailors make use of the polyphasic sleeping pattern where they sleep for about 15 to 20 minutes at a stretch, giving time for scanning the horizon. While in the case of cruising sail boats there would be enough time to spot the possible navigational issues due to their relatively slow speed, it would be different in the case of racing. Therefore, in order to reduce possible dangers, race participants choose the route away from shallow coastal areas and congested navigation lanes. Recreational sailors tend to go for coastal or tropical voyages that call for extra caution when looking for commercial vessels. Moreover, non-commercial ships can also rely on the AIS Automatic Identification System which provides automatic collision warnings.

== Notable milestones ==
=== The pioneers ===
The recorded history of modern single-handed voyages begins with an American sailor, Josiah Shackford, who is reported to have sailed from France to Surinam, in South America, although this has not been reliably authenticated. Another unauthenticated voyage is that of Captain Cleveland of Salem, who was said to have sailed nearly around the world single-handed in a 15-foot (5 m) boat around 1800. A more likely account is that of J.M. Crenston, who is reported to have sailed a 40-foot (12 m) boat from New Bedford, Massachusetts, to San Francisco (whether by Cape Horn or the Strait of Magellan is unknown).

Single-handed sailing received a great impetus in the middle of the 19th century, when it was popularised by three British sailors, R.T. McMullen, John MacGregor and Frank Cowper. Although neither man made a major single-handed offshore passage, MacGregor achieved some fame for sailing a 21-foot (6 m) yawl from London to Paris and back in 1867. His book, The Voyage Alone in the Yawl Rob Roy; McMullen's book, Down Channel, published in 1869, and Frank Cowper's classic Sailing Tours series (1892–96) inspired many people to cruise.

The first authenticated single-handed ocean crossing was made in 1876 by a 30-year-old fisherman named Alfred "Centennial" Johnson. Johnson sailed out of Gloucester, Massachusetts, to cross the Atlantic Ocean in an open dory named Centennial. His voyage was timed to celebrate the United States centennial. He set off on the 3,000-nautical-mile (5,600 km) crossing on June 15, 1876; he averaged about 70 miles (113 km) a day, and contacted many vessels along the way, getting positions from their navigators. After surviving a major gale that capsized the boat, he finally made landfall at Abercastle, Wales, on August 12, 1876. Another Gloucesterman, Howard Blackburn, made single-handed Atlantic crossings in 1899 and 1901.

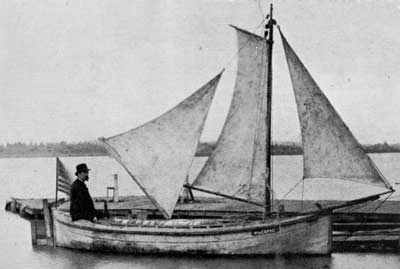
Bernard Gilboy and his 18 ft schooner Pacific

In 1882, Bernard Gilboy sailed a 19-foot (6 m) schooner that he built himself from San Francisco 7,000 miles (11,265 km) across the Pacific in 162 days until he was picked up exhausted and starving off Queensland, Australia, after a swordfish pierced his hull and he lost the rudder.

William Albert Andrews, of Beverley, Massachusetts, made several significant single-handed voyages, and instigated the first single-handed trans-Atlantic race. Andrews first crossed the Atlantic with his brother in a 19-foot (6 m) dory in 1878. He made an aborted attempt at a single-handed crossing in 1888, and then in 1891 he issued a challenge to any single-hander to race him across the ocean for a prize of $5,000. Josiah W. Lawlor, the son of a famous boatbuilder, took up the challenge, and the two men built 15-foot (5 m) boats for the race. They set off from Crescent Beach near Boston on June 21, 1891. Andrews, capsized several times and was finally picked up by a steamer; but Lawlor arrived at Coverack, Cornwall, on August 5, 1891.

The sport of long-distance single-handed sailing was firmly established with the famous voyage of Joshua Slocum, who circumnavigated the world between 1895 and 1898. Despite widespread opinion that such a voyage was impossible (there was no Panama Canal then), Slocum, a retired sea captain, rebuilt a 37-foot (11 m) sloop, Spray, and sailed it around the world—the first single-handed circumnavigation of the world. His book Sailing Alone Around the World is still considered a classic adventure, and it inspired many others to take to the seas.

In 1942, the Argentine sailor Vito Dumas set out on a single-handed circumnavigation of the Southern Ocean. He left Buenos Aires in June, sailing Lehg II, a 31-foot (9 m) ketch. He had only the most basic and makeshift gear; he had no radio, for fear of being shot as a spy, and was forced to stuff his clothes with newspaper to keep warm. His voyage of 20,000 miles (32,000 km) was not a true circumnavigation, as it was contained within the southern hemisphere; however, he made the first single-handed passage of the three great capes, and indeed the first successful single-handed passage of Cape Horn. With only three landfalls, Vito Dumas described the legs of his trip as the longest that had been made by a single-hander, and in the most ferocious oceans on the Earth.

From May 1955 to April 1956, Florentino Das sailed Lady Timarau, a ship of the United States Navy converted into a sailboat, from Kewalo Basin in Hawaii to Allen, Northern Samar, Philippines, from where he had immigrated. His voyage took him through Ponape, Truk Island, the Hall Islands, and Yap Island, and it was interrupted midway because of a lack of funds.

=== The beginnings of modern racing ===
Organised single-handed yacht racing was pioneered by Britons "Blondie" Hasler and Francis Chichester, who conceived the idea of a single-handed race across the Atlantic Ocean. This was a revolutionary concept at the time, as the idea was thought to be extremely impractical, particularly in the adverse conditions of their proposed route—a westward crossing of the north Atlantic Ocean. Nevertheless, their original half-crown bet on first place developed into the first single-handed transatlantic yacht race, the OSTAR, which was held in 1960. The race was a success, and was won in 40 days by Chichester, then aged 58, in Gipsy Moth III; Hasler finished second, in 48 days, sailing the junk-rigged Jester. Hasler's wind-vane self-steering gear revolutionised short-handed sailing, and his other major innovation—using a junk rig for safer and more manageable shorthanded sailing—influenced many subsequent sailors. Chichester placed second in the second running of the race four years later. The winner on that occasion, Eric Tabarly, sailed in the first ever boat specifically designed for single-handed ocean racing, the 44-foot (13 m) ketch Pen Duick II.

Not content with his achievements, Chichester set his sights on the next logical goal—a racing-style circumnavigation of the world. In 1966, he set off in Gipsy Moth IV, a yacht custom-built for a speed attempt, in order to set the fastest possible time for a round-the-world trip—in effect, the first speed record for a single-handed circumnavigation. He followed the clipper route from Plymouth, United Kingdom, to Sydney, Australia, where he stopped over for 48 days, then continued south of Cape Horn back to Plymouth. In the process he became the first single-handed sailor to circumnavigate west-to-east, by the clipper route, with just one stop (of 48 days) in 274 days overall, with a sailing time of 226 days, twice as fast as the previous record for a small vessel. At the age of 65, Chichester had once again revolutionised single-handed sailing. The first single-handed round-the-world yacht race—and actually the first round-the-world yacht race in any format—was the Sunday Times Golden Globe Race, starting between June 1 and October 31 (the skippers set off at different times) in 1968. Of the nine boats which started:

- four retired before leaving the Atlantic
- Chay Blyth, who had never sailed a boat before, made it to East London in South Africa, past Cape Agulhas
- Nigel Tetley's boat sank after crossing his outbound track, while in the clear lead for the speed record
- Donald Crowhurst attempted to fake a circumnavigation, went insane, and committed suicide
- Bernard Moitessier completed a circumnavigation, rejected the race's (and society's) inherent materialism, and despite being the fastest racer (on elapsed time) and hot favourite to win, decided to keep sailing, and completed another half-circumnavigation before finishing in Tahiti
- Robin Knox-Johnston was the only person to complete the race, becoming (in 1969) the first person to sail single-handed, unassisted, and non-stop around the world.

The first woman to sail from Los Angeles to Hawaii was Sharon Sites Adams, in 1965 with a 25-foot Danish folkboat. She added to this feat in 1969 by sailing a Sea Sharp II fiberglass Mariner 31 from Yokosuka, Japan, to San Diego, CA in 1969. These feats have been documented and described in her book "Pacific Lady."

=== The modern era ===
Even after the main "firsts" had been achieved—first solo circumnavigation, first non-stop—other sailors set out to make their mark on history. In 1965, at the age of just 16, Robin Lee Graham set out from southern California to sail around the world in his 24-foot (7 m) sailboat Dove, and in 1970 he successfully completed the youngest (at age 16–21) solo circumnavigation. Following in Chichester's wake, Alec Rose, a 58-year-old British grocer, set off in 1967 to sail solo around the world. He completed his voyage on July 4, 1968, after two stops, and was knighted the following day. He subsequently wrote a book, My Lively Lady, about his voyage. Despite his failure in the Golden Globe, Chay Blyth had decided that endurance sailing was for him, and in 1970–1971 he made the first westabout single-handed non-stop circumnavigation via the great capes, i.e., against the prevailing winds of the roaring forties.

Single-handed racing continued to develop with the creation in 1977 of the Mini-Transat, a single-handed transatlantic race for boats smaller than 6.5 metres (21 ft). The first edition started from Penzance, UK; today it runs from Douarnenez, France, to Guadeloupe.

The major women's firsts were achieved in just over ten years. Poland's Krystyna Chojnowska-Liskiewicz set off to sail around the world by the trade-wind route in 1976 and on her return to the Canary Islands in 1978 became the first woman to perform a single-handed circumnavigation (with stops). Less than two months later, Naomi James completed the first single-handed circumnavigation (with stops) by a woman via Cape Horn, in just 272 days, and in 1988, Kay Cottee became the first woman to perform a solo non-stop circumnavigation in her 11-metre (36 ft) sloop First Lady, taking 189 days. It was not until 2006, however, that a woman—Dee Caffari—completed a non-stop westabout circumnavigation. The first woman to win overall a single-handed ocean race was Florence Arthaud, who won the Route du Rhum (Saint-Malo, France, to Pointe-à-Pitre, French Caribbean) in 1990.

In 1982, the first single-handed round-the-world race since the Golden Globe, the BOC Challenge, was inaugurated. This event is raced in stages, with between two and four intermediate stops, going eastabout by way of the great capes, and is run every four years. The first edition was won by French yachtsman Philippe Jeantot, who won all four legs of the race with an overall elapsed time of just over 159 days. With changes in sponsorship the race later became known as the Around Alone, and is now the Velux 5 Oceans Race.

With the success of the BOC, the stage was set for a new non-stop race, and 1989–1990 saw the first running of the Vendée Globe, a single-handed, non-stop, round-the-world yacht race, by way of the great capes. Founded by former BOC Challenge winner Philippe Jeantot, this is essentially the successor to the Golden Globe race. The race, which takes place every four years, is regarded by many as the ultimate event in single-handed sailing. The inaugural event was won by Titouan Lamazou of France, in Ecureuil d'Aquitaine II, with a time of 109 days, 8 hours, 48 minutes.

In 2012, the Silverrudder race was established in Svendborg, Denmark. Quickly, it grew to become the largest single-handed race in the World with currently (2021) 450 participants signed up. All sailboats can participate. The race is divided into 6 classes: Small, Medium, Large, Extra large keelboats and Small and Large multi hulls. The race is more an endurance test for the skipper than a real race since the boats are so different and no handicap rule is in place. However, there are some quite big groups of similar boats who has a race in the race. This being the Seascape 18, 24 and 27 as well as the X-79, X-99 and the Mini Transat 6.50s.

== Single-handed records ==
The theoretical distance for each course is shown, and the average speed based on this theoretical distance is shown for each record for comparison purposes. Note, however, that the actual distance sailed will be more than the theoretical distance, particularly on upwind and round-the-world courses; the actual average speed will therefore also be higher than that shown.

=== Round the World Records ===
Round the world eastabout (21,760 miles)
Type	Time	Date	Sailor	Boat	Speed	Comments	Ref
Outright	Jan 2008	57d 13h 34m	Francis Joyon (FRA)	IDEC 2	15.75	Joyon set a new world record for a single-handed non-stop circumnavigation, covering 26,400 nautical miles (48,893 km), including a short-lived record 614 mi in 24 hours (25.9 knots).	
Type	Time	Date	Sailor	Boat	Speed	Comments	Ref
Outright Female	2005	71d 14h 18m 33s	Ellen MacArthur (GBR)	Tri - B&Q	15.9	this at the time was also the outright record	
Type	Time	Date	Sailor	Boat	Speed	Comments	-
Monohull	Feb 2009	78d 02h 16m	François Gabart (FRA)	Macif	11.52	Gabart won the 2012-2013 edition of the Vendée Globe, taking the world record for a single-handed, non-stop, monohull circumnavigation from his mentor Michel Desjoyeaux.	
Type	Time	Date	Sailor	Boat	Speed	Comments	Ref
Monohull Female	Feb 2021	87d 02h 24m 25s	Clarisse Crémer (FRA)	IMOCA 60 - Banque Populaire X		Set during the 2020-2021 Vendée Globe	
Monohull Female	Feb 2001	94d 04h 25m	Ellen MacArthur (GBR)	IMOCA 60 - Kingfisher	9.6	Set during the 2000-2001 Vendée Globe	
Monohull Female	1996	140d 04h 38m	Catherine Chabaud (FRA)	IMOCA 60 - Whirlpool-Europe 2		Set during the 1996-1997 Vendée Globe	
Monohull Female	1978-06-07	272 days	Naomi James (NZL)				
Round the world westabout (21,760 miles)
Type	Date	Time	Sailor	Boat	Speed	Comments	Ref
Outright	March 2004	122d 14h 04m	Jean-Luc Van Den Heede	Adrien	7.4	Van den Heede sailed the monohull Adrien around the world westabout, against the winds and currents, to set the record for a single-handed westabout circumnavigation.	
Female		178d 17h 55m	Dee Caffari (GBR)	Challenge 72 - Aviva			

=== Other Records ===
Type	Time	Date	Sailor	Boat	Speed	Comments	Ref
Transpacific west to east (4,525 miles)
Type	Time	Date	Sailor	Boat	Speed	Comments	Ref
Multihull	20 d 9 h 53 m	Aug 1996	Steve Fossett (USA)	Lakota	9.2	Fossett sailed the little-contested downwind course from Yokohoma to San Francisco to set a multihull record.	
Cadiz - San Salvador (3,884 miles)
Type	Time	Date	Sailor	Boat	Speed	Comments	Ref
Multihull	9 d 20 h 35 m	November 2008	Francis Joyon (FRA)	IDEC 2	18.94		
Transatlantic, west to east (2,925 miles)
Type	Time	Date	Sailor	Boat	Speed	Comments	Ref
Overall	5d 19h 30m	July 2008	Thomas Coville (FRA)	Sodebo	20.97	Thomas Coville beat the previous holder Francis Joyon by more than 8 hours to set a new west-to-east multihull record from Ambrose Light to Lizard Point.	
Multihull woman	7 d 3 h 50 m	June 2004	Ellen MacArthur (GBR)	B&Q/Castorama	17.0	MacArthur sailed her trimaran B&Q/Castorama from Ambrose Light to Lizard Point to set a new world record for a transatlantic crossing by women, beating the previous crewed record as well as the singlehanded version.	
Transatlantic, east to west (2,800 miles)
Type	Time	Date	Sailor	Boat	Speed	Comments	Ref
Overall	9 d 23 h 55 m	June 2000	Francis Joyon (FRA)	Eure et Loir	11.7	Joyon's voyage in his trimaran from Plymouth to Newport set the overall record for an east-to-west (upwind) transatlantic passage.	
Monohull, woman any vessel	14d 23h 11 m	June 2000	Ellen MacArthur (GBR)	Kingfisher	7.8	MacArthur sailed the same route to take the record for a single-handed monohull east-to-west passage, and also the record for a woman in any vessel.	
Round Britain and Ireland, all islands (1,787 miles)
Type	Time	Date	Sailor	Boat	Speed	Comments	Ref
Monohull	7d 08h 47m	May 2005	Jean-Luc Van Den Heede	Adrien	10.1		
Miami - New York (947 miles)
Type	Time	Date	Sailor	Boat	Speed	Comments	Ref
Multihull	3 d 5 h 0 m	July 2005	Thomas Coville	Sodeb'O	12.3		
Newport - Bermuda (635 miles)
Type	Time	Date	Sailor	Boat	Speed	Comments	Ref
Multihull	1 d 16 h 52 m	June 1999	Steve Fossett	Lakota	15.5		

== Criticism ==
=== Questionable legality ===
The International Regulations for Preventing Collisions at Sea (COLREGs) is the international agreement between 168 UN member nations forming the 'rules-of-the-road' to be followed by ships and other vessels at sea. Any citizen of a signing nation is bound by these rules when in international waters. As they pertain to single-handed sailing:

Rule #1(a) – These Rules shall apply to all vessels upon the high seas and in all waters connected therewith navigable by seagoing vessels.

Rule #5 – Every vessel must at all times keep a proper look-out by sight, hearing, and all available means in order to judge if risk of collision exists.

Since a single-handed, long-distance sailor will need to sleep at some point, the activity may be in violation of international law. Currently there is no evidence of authorities pro-actively enforcing the look-out rule on non-commercial craft. However, in the event of an incident at sea, if the master of a vessel is found to have violated one or more COLREGs, they may be found completely liable for the costs of rescue efforts, property damages or loss, loss of income, salvage costs, environmental cleanup costs, and so on. In the event of loss of life, criminal gross negligence charges are possible. As a defence, some sailors mention:

Rule #18 – A power-driven vessel must give way to: (...), a sailing vessel (...)

It is also a reasonable interpretation of the COLREGs to place the boat "not under command" and to make no way, displaying proper lighting for such, to inform other vessels that a single-handed boat is not able to perform avoidance maneuvers because the crew is asleep. No legal cases have arisen to date to adjudicate whether or not such an approach is legal, because single-handed sailing is rare and examples of collisions caused by single-handed sailing are difficult to find.

Finally, sensor technology has reached the point where a proper watch can be maintained by electronics that alert humans. In fact the COLREGs require electronic watch-keeping if technologies such as radar are aboard the vessel. Unmanned ocean-going drones already exist and will become routine within the next few decades, and those watch-keeping technologies will become available to single-handed sailors to ameliorate legal issues arising from the failure to maintain a constant human watch.

=== Other ===
With a spate of teenagers attempting to break the age record for sailing singlehanded around the world, their parents have come under criticism and legal challenges for allowing their offspring to engage in such potentially dangerous activity. This was highlighted by the expensive rescue of Abby Sunderland in 2010, over $200,000, paid for by the Australian government.

== See also ==
- All Is Lost
- Category:Single-handed sailors
