= Mary Falk =

British solicitor and sailor (1946–2020)

Mary Elizabeth Falk (8 June 1946 – 19 September 2020) was a British solicitor and yachtswoman.

The daughter of a master at Rugby School, Falk was educated at St Mary's School, Calne and Newnham College, Cambridge, where she read classics.

Falk spent her entire legal career at Farrer & Co., rising to become one of the firm's first female partners.

In 1996, Falk achieved the fastest Atlantic crossing in a 35-foot boat on record, in 19 days, 22 hours, and 57 minutes.
