= Urupa =

Urupa may refer to:

- Urupá, a municipality located in Brazil
- Urupā, a burial ground of the Māori people; see Karehana Bay § History
- Urupa language, a Chapacuran language native to Brazil
