= Karehana Bay =

Bay and nearby residential area at the western end of Plimmerton, New Zealand

- Suburb
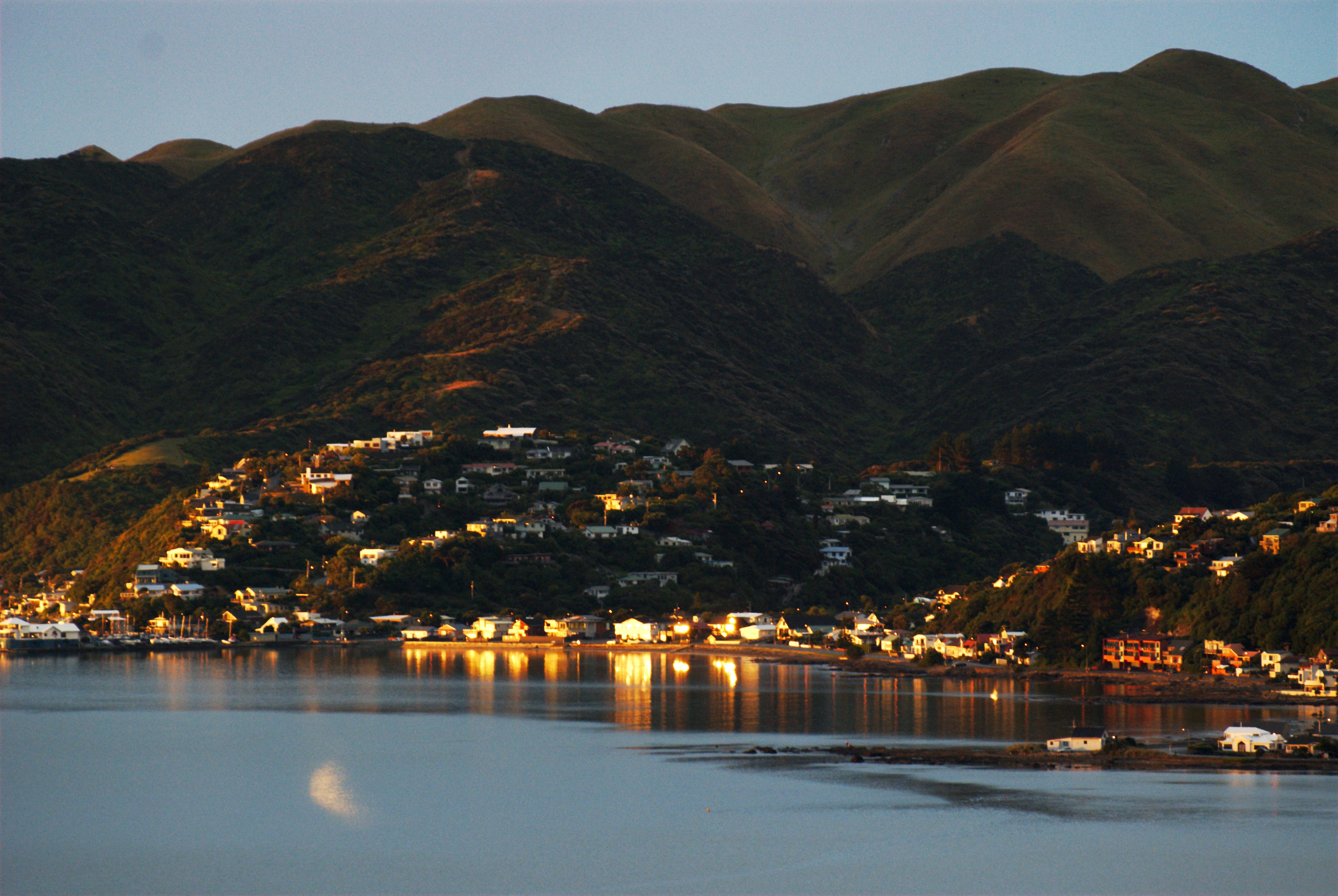
- Karehana Bay at sunset
- Interactive map of Karehana Bay
- Coordinates: 41.074°S 174.860°E
- Country: New Zealand
- City: Porirua
- Local authority: Porirua City Council
- Electoral ward: Pāuatahanui General Ward; Porirua Māori Ward

Area
  - Land: 68 ha (170 acres)

Population (2023 census)
  - Total: 1,086
  - Density: 1,600/km^{2} (4,100/sq mi)

Karehana Bay is a bay and nearby residential area at the western end of Plimmerton, a northern coastal locality of Porirua. It is located near the entrance to the Porirua Harbour, to the south-east of Hongoeka. It is about 5 minutes drive to Karehana Bay from the State Highway 59 turnoff to Plimmerton. The area looks out towards Mana Island and across Cook Strait to the South Island.

Karehana Bay is the site of a fine sediment beach, the Plimmerton Boating Club (since 1925), Karehana Park and the Karehana Bay Scenic Reserve.

== Name ==
The bay and the adjacent residential area are named after Whakataki Karehana, a Ngāti Toa chief who lived in the area up until the 1890s. The name "Karehana Bay" was assigned to the area by the Hutt County Council in 1923. The name has appeared in maps and survey plans since 1952, and the Karehana Bay residential area was first labelled as a separate suburb (distinct from Plimmerton) in Department of Lands and Survey maps in 1965. The suburb name continues to appear in Land Information New Zealand (LINZ) topographical maps, along with the bay. However, in 2011 the New Zealand Geographic Board accepted a Porirua City Council proposal to amalgamate the recorded names of "Karehana Bay" and "Plimmerton" under the official name "Plimmerton".

== History ==
Karehana Bay was the site of Motuhara Pā, which may have predated the arrival of Ngāti Toa in the 1820s. Archaeological finds suggest that prior to the Ngäti Toa occupation it was a small kāinga with associated urupā (burial ground). Te Rauparaha's canoe, Te Ahu a Tūranga, landed at Motuhara. When Te Rauparaha was seized from Taupo Village in 1846, Motuhara, along with Hongoeka, was also searched. And when he was being taken to HMS Driver, he called out for help from Motuhara.

Ownership of the surrounding Motuhara Block was investigated by the Native Land Court of New Zealand in 1871 and resulted in individual title over the block being issued to a group of Ngāti Toa: Ropata Hurumutu, Te Karehana Te Weta, Te Horo Hawea, Piripi Poutini, Te Karina Tuhaia, Hoani Warena, Pene Koti Te Teka, Wiremu Nera Te Kauae and Wi Parata. Te Karira Tuhaia died around 1875, and ownership passed to Raiha Prosser. By the 1890s, Te Karehana Whakataki was described as living alone at Motuhara, and by 1894 he had moved to Takapūwāhia.

The coastal area around Plimmerton, including Karehana Bay, began to be developed in the late 19th and early 20th century. In 1905 George Troup purchased 365 acres of the Motuhara Block. In the following years, Troup subdivided a large area of Karehana Bay and laid out several of its roads, including Cluny, Gordon, Airlie and Ogilvie roads. At that time the subdivision was known as the Plimmerton Extension, with the first auction of the land held on 26 January 1909. A further auction of 100 properties was held on 6 March 1912. Early baches were owned by Ernest Gyton and Frederick Bilton.

After World War I, sales increased and the Plimmerton Extension developed rapidly. By the 1920s and 1930s, Karehana Bay was a separate community from Plimmerton, with a popular beach. St Paul's Presbyterian Church opened in 1924, and held its final service in 2007. A sea wall was completed along the foreshore in 1938.

== Demographics ==
The suburb of Karehana Bay covers 0.68 km^{2} (0.26 sq mi). It is part of the larger Plimmerton statistical area.

Historical population
Year	Pop.	±% p.a.
2006	1,122	—
2013	1,146	+0.30%
2018	1,119	−0.48%
2023	1,086	−0.60%

Karehana Bay had a population of 1,086 in the 2023 New Zealand census, a decrease of 33 people (−2.9%) since the 2018 census, and a decrease of 60 people (−5.2%) since the 2013 census. There were 534 males, 549 females, and 3 people of other genders in 441 dwellings. 2.8% of people identified as LGBTIQ+. There were 171 people (15.7%) aged under 15 years, 138 (12.7%) aged 15 to 29, 531 (48.9%) aged 30 to 64, and 249 (22.9%) aged 65 or older.

People could identify as more than one ethnicity. The results were 92.5% European (Pākehā); 11.9% Māori; 3.3% Pasifika; 3.0% Asian; 0.6% Middle Eastern, Latin American and African New Zealanders (MELAA); and 1.7% other, which includes people giving their ethnicity as "New Zealander". English was spoken by 98.6%, Māori by 3.6%, Samoan by 0.3%, and other languages by 9.9%. No language could be spoken by 1.1% (e.g. too young to talk). New Zealand Sign Language was known by 0.3%. The percentage of people born overseas was 26.0, compared with 28.8% nationally.

Religious affiliations were 32.0% Christian, 0.6% Hindu, 0.6% New Age, 0.3% Jewish, and 1.7% other religions. People who answered that they had no religion were 58.8%, and 6.4% of people did not answer the census question.

Of those at least 15 years old, 411 (44.9%) people had a bachelor's or higher degree, 387 (42.3%) had a post-high school certificate or diploma, and 102 (11.1%) people exclusively held high school qualifications. 276 people (30.2%) earned over $100,000 compared to 12.1% nationally. The employment status of those at least 15 was 492 (53.8%) full-time, 141 (15.4%) part-time, and 21 (2.3%) unemployed.

== Notable references and events ==
The bay features in the poem by Denis Glover, Threnody: "In Plimmerton, in Plimmerton, the little penguins play, and one dead albatross was found at Karehana Bay"

Karehana Bay has hosted Plimmerton Kindergarten's annual Plimmerton Mid-Winter Dip fund raiser since 1997.
