= Porirua =

City in the North Island of New Zealand

Porirua Pari-rua
- City
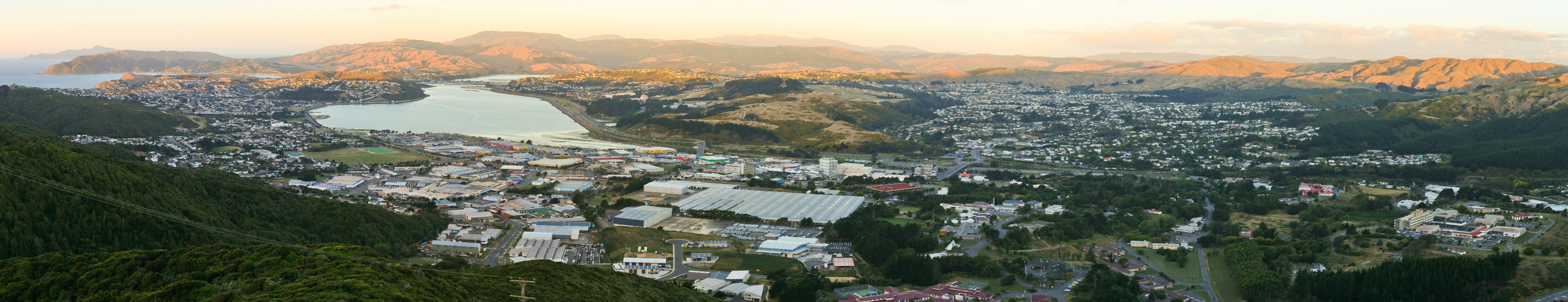
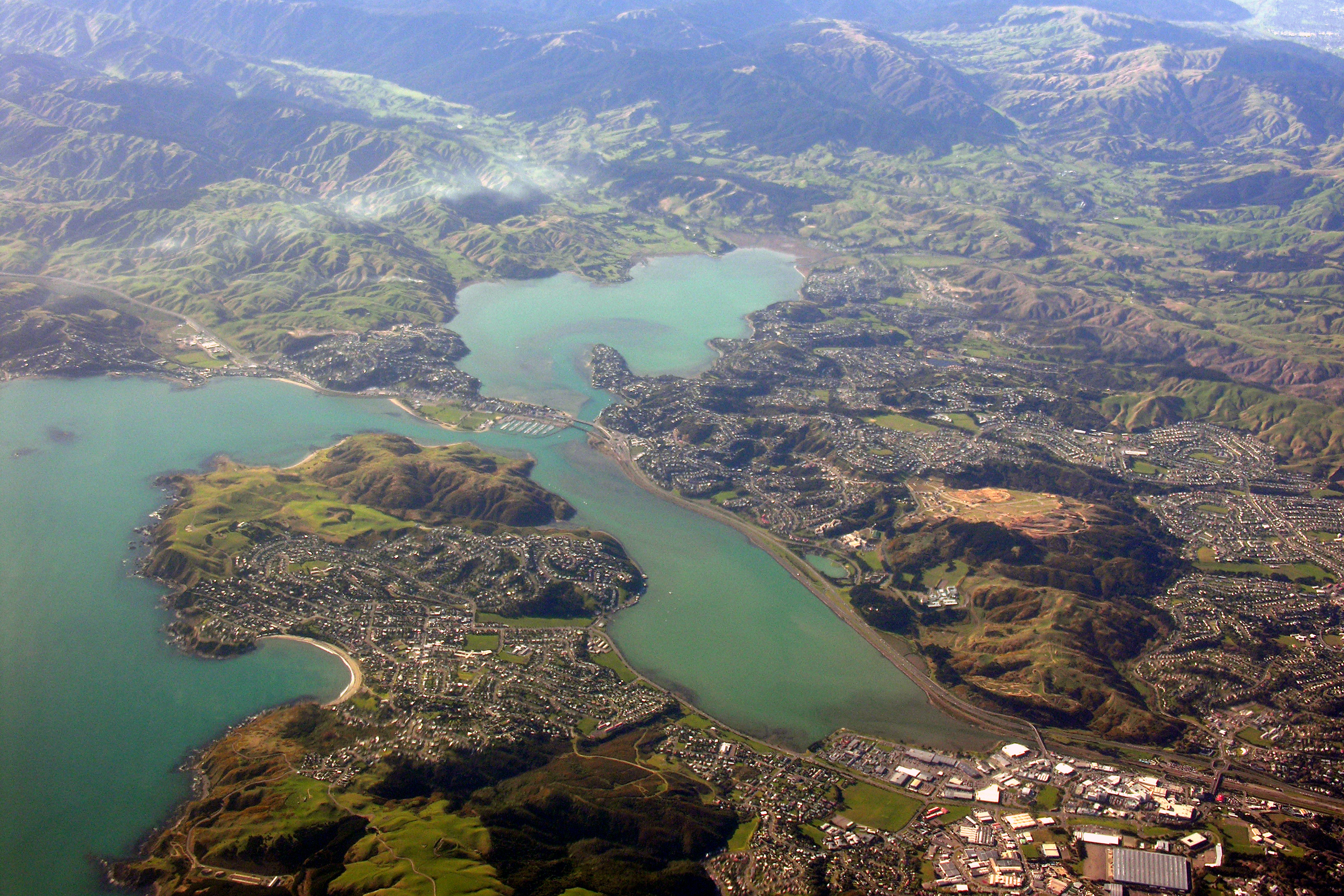
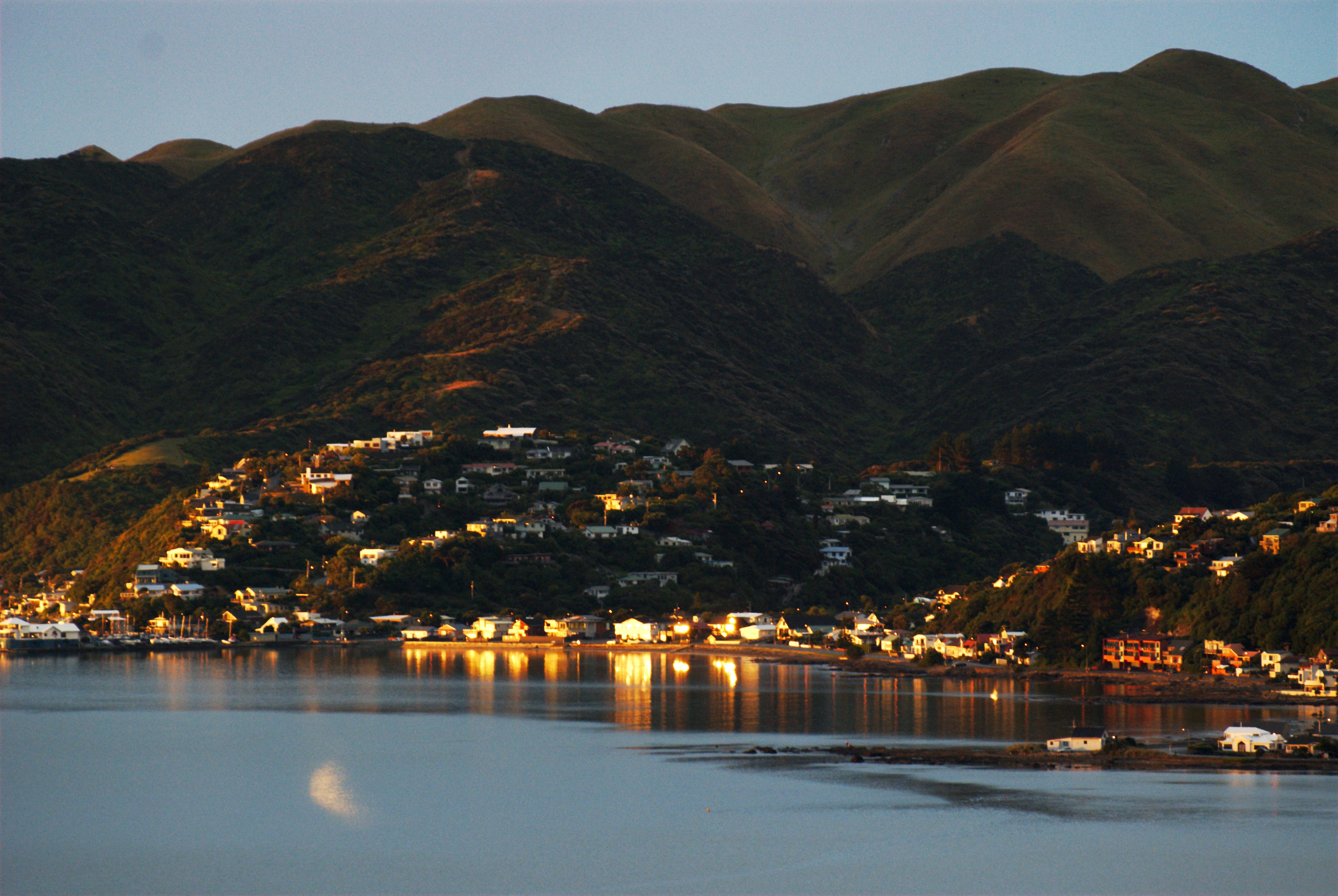
- Top: Panoramic view of Porirua from Tītahi Bay to Ranui Heights. Bottom: Aerial view of Porirua Town Centre and Karehana Bay at sunset

- Flag Coat of arms
- Motto: Māori: Mo Te Katoa Nga mahi English: All That is Done is For the Benefit of All
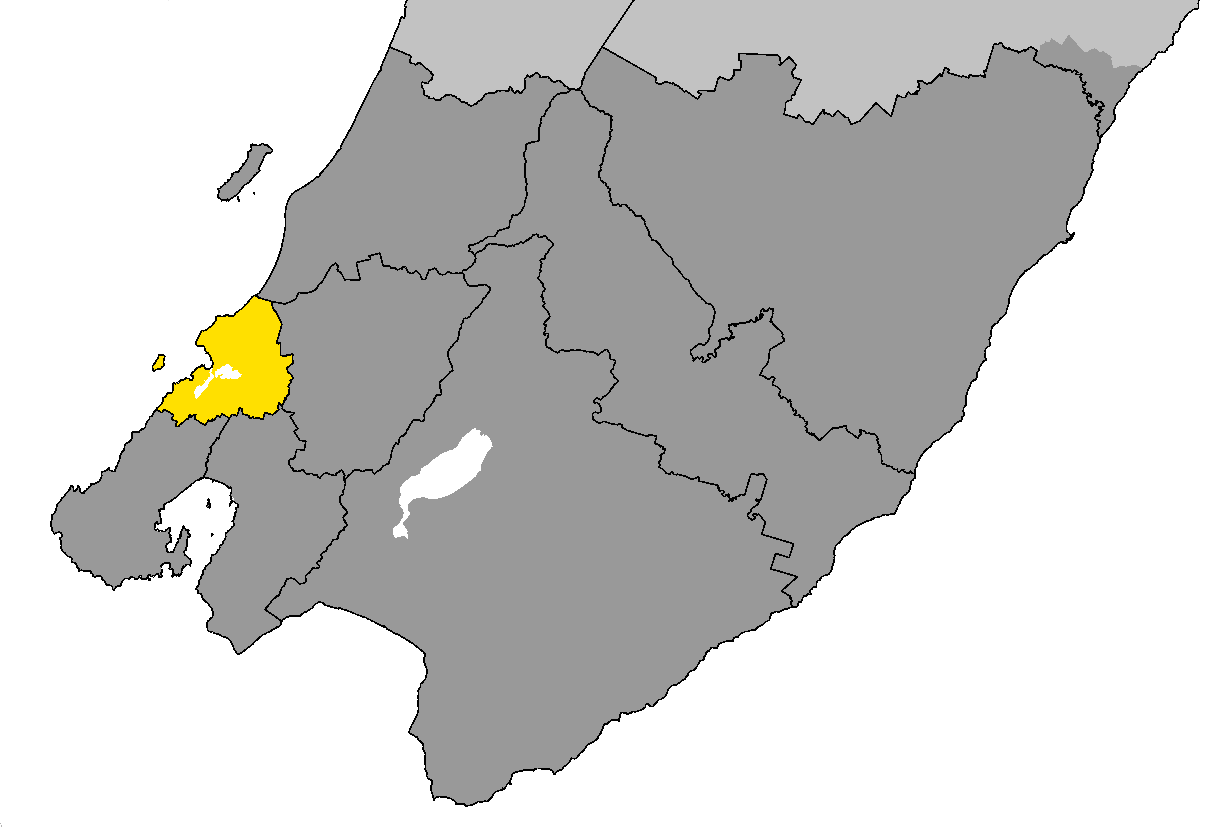
- Coordinates: 41°08′S 174°51′E
- Country: New Zealand
- Region: Wellington
- Wards: Pāuatahanui; Onepoto; Parirua (Māori)
- Electorates: Kapiti (general); Kenepuru (general); Te Tai Hauāuru (Māori)

Government
  - Type: City council
  - Mayor: Anita Baker
  - Deputy mayor: Kylie Wihapi
  - Territorial authority: Porirua City Council
  - MPs: Tim Costley (New Zealand National Party); Barbara Edmonds (New Zealand Labour Party); Debbie Ngarewa-Packer (Te Pāti Māori)

Area
  - Territorial: 174.80 km^{2} (67.49 sq mi)
  - Urban: 61.19 km^{2} (23.63 sq mi)
  - Rural: 113.82 km^{2} (43.95 sq mi)

Population (June 2025)
  - Territorial: 61,500
  - Density: 352/km^{2} (911/sq mi)
  - Urban: 60,100
  - Urban density: 982/km^{2} (2,540/sq mi)
- Website: poriruacity.govt.nz

Porirua (Māori: Pari-ā-Rua) is a city in the Wellington Region of the North Island of New Zealand and is one of the four cities that constitute the Wellington metropolitan area. The name 'Porirua' is a corruption of 'Pari-rua', meaning "the tide sweeping up both reaches". It almost completely surrounds Porirua Harbour at the southern end of the Kāpiti Coast. As of 2023, Porirua has a population of 62,400 people, and is a diverse city with 26.5% of the population identifying as Pasifika and 23.0% of the population identifying as Māori.

== Name ==
The name "Porirua" has a Māori origin: it may represent a variant of pari-rua ("two tides"), a reference to the two arms of the Porirua Harbour. In the 19th century, the name designated a land-registration district that stretched from Kaiwharawhara (or Kaiwara) on the north-west shore of Wellington Harbour northwards to and around Porirua Harbour.

The road climbing the hill from Kaiwharawhara towards Ngaio, Khandallah, Johnsonville and Tawa still bears the name "Old Porirua Road".

== History ==
Tradition holds that, prior to habitation, Kupe was the first visitor to the area, and that he bestowed names of significant sites such as Te Mana o Kupe ki Aotearoa (Mana Island). In addition, it is said that Kupe left his anchor stone, Te Punga o Matahouroa at Whitireia, which is now held at Te Papa Tongarewa.

There is evidence of human habitation in Porirua since 1450 at the latest, during the "moa hunter" period of Māori history. The forests, sea, estuaries and swamps provided abundant food and materials. The Porirua area came to be occupied by a succession of tribes, including Ngāti Tara and Ngāti Ira.

Ngāti Toa people migrated south from Kawhia, and took control of the Porirua coast in the 1820s. By the 1840s they had established 12 pā, with Takapūwāhia and Hongoeka still occupied by marae today.

From the late 1830s, European settlers began to express interest in the Porirua region, culminating in the controversial sale of most of the region in 1847. In 1839, the New Zealand Company signed an agreement with Ngāti Toa from which it claimed to have acquired the entire southern part of the North Island. Following the signing of the Treaty of Waitangi, an inquiry by Land Claims Commissioner William Spain found that most of the alleged purchase, including Porirua, was invalid. However, rising tensions with European settlers led to Ngāti Toa chief Te Rauparaha being captured by 200 British troops and police in July 1846. Shortly afterwards, the Hutt Valley campaign led to chief Te Rangihaeata's retreat to Poroutawhao in the Horowhenua. In April 1847, eight remaining chiefs, including Tamihana Te Rauparaha, Matene Te Whiwhi and Rawiri Puaha, signed a deed for the sale of 69,000 acres for £2,000, comprising almost the entire area from Mākara in the south to Paekākāriki in the north. Three reserves totalling 10,000 acres were left aside for Ngāti Toa. Ngāti Toa hold that the deed was coerced by the holding of Te Rauparaha and that the chiefs signing sought his release.

In the 19th century, a small European settlement grew up, partly because of the need for a ferry across the harbour.

The 1880s and 1890s saw the establishment of the Porirua Lunatic Asylum on the hill south-west of Porirua village. Following the Mental Defectives Act of 1911, the Asylum became Porirua Mental Hospital.

In the late 1940s state planning envisaged Porirua becoming a satellite city of Wellington with state housing. This required improved rail and road links with Wellington and rail and road development has contributed much to the growth of the Porirua area by reducing travel times, making it possible to live in the Porirua area and work in Wellington, and by making day-trips from Wellington to the beaches at Paremata, and Plimmerton relatively easy.

Since the 1940s, Porirua has grown to a city population approaching 57,000, with state housing no longer in the majority. Major territorial additions to the city occurred in 1973 and 1988 as part of the reduction and eventual abolition of Hutt County.

On 7 June 1976, New Zealand's first McDonald's restaurant opened in Porirua, on the corner of Cobham Court and Hagley Street. The original restaurant closed on 24 April 2009, and the store relocated to Kenepuru Drive.

=== Industry ===
Substantial industrial areas, generally west of the city centre, have evolved. During the 1960s Kodak, UEB Industries and many small businesses opened at Elsdon. During the following decade, Ashley Wallpapers developed the former UEB property and after favourable negotiations with the government, Todd Motors (later Mitsubishi) moved from Petone to Porirua.

Todd Motors was a vehicle assembly company which moved from Petone and opened a large factory in Porirua in 1975. The factory covered 5.2 hectares (13 acres) on a 33-hectare (82-acre) site known as Todd Park. At its peak there were 1500 employees building 22,000 vehicles per year. The company was sold to Mitsubishi in 1987 and the factory closed in 1998.

Hills Hats (established in 1875) set up premises in Porirua in the 1950s. By 1996 it employed 80 people at Porirua and was exporting 75% of its production to 23 countries. The company was sold to overseas investors in 1997, then went into receivership and was bought by Wellington investors in 1998. In 2003, the company shifted from Porirua to Petone.

Bonds Hosiery (later Hilton Bonds, then Sara Lee Apparel, part of Pacific Dunlop) was established in Porirua in the 1960s or early 1970s. In 2001, the factory closed with the loss of 55 jobs, the result of declining hosiery sales worldwide.

Whittaker's confectionery manufacturers moved their business from Wellington to Porirua in 1969 and as of 2022, have around 160 employees at the Porirua factory.

=== Rail ===
The development of the rail through Porirua, part of the Kāpiti Line, has contributed significantly to the development of Porirua as a satellite city of Wellington. The Wellington and Manawatu Railway Company opened a railway line through Johnsonville from Wellington to Porirua in 1885. The railway reached Longburn (south of Palmerston North) in 1886 to connect with the government's lines to Taranaki and Napier. With the acquisition of the company by the government in 1908, the line to Porirua and northward to Longburn became part of the North Island Main Trunk railway. The railway provided regular passenger services between Wellington and Porirua and linked Porirua to other North Island centres. A shunting service from Wellington delivered goods wagons to sidings at Porirua, Paremata, Plimmerton, and Pukerua Bay and brought timber for the construction of houses in the area.

The Tawa Flat railway deviation providing double-track railway with double line automatic signalling as far as Tawa opened to passenger services on 19 June 1937, reducing travel time for passenger trains from Wellington to Porirua by 15 minutes, to 27 minutes rather than 43 to 48 minutes.

During 1940, Centralised Train Control (CTC), which allowed direct control of signals and train movements by Train Control in Wellington, was progressively installed on the single line sections of track north of Tawa, replacing tablet working and allowing more efficient, flexible, and rapid control of train movements. CTC between Plimmerton and Paekākāriki applied from 25 February 1940, Paremata to Plimmerton from 30 June, and Tawa to Porirua from 4 December 1940.

On 24 July 1940, the line through Porirua, from Wellington to Paekākāriki, was electrified, and double track completed from Plimmerton to South Junction, just north of Muri railway station. Electrification allowed the introduction of electric ED class locomotives, first introduced in 1938 for use on this line, to haul passenger and goods trains. Electric locomotives eliminated the smoke nuisance in the tunnels on the line and allowed longer trains to run. DM/D electric multiple units first ran to Porirua on 5 September 1949 and replaced the majority of locomotive-hauled passenger trains and allowed a more frequent and faster train service. The duplication of the line from Plimmerton to South Junction allowed a more frequent train service between Porirua and Paekākāriki.

Duplication of the track from Tawa to Porirua station opened on 15 December 1957. This completed double line automatic signalling from Wellington distant junction, just south of Kaiwharawhara, to Porirua, and eliminated CTC between Tawa and Porirua. This work and the provision of additional signals between Kaiwharawhara and Tawa, allowed close following of trains and more frequent and faster train services between Wellington and Porirua. During peak periods, many multiple unit trains were now terminated at Porirua and returned to Wellington to provide a more frequent service between Wellington and Porirua than was provided for stations north of Porirua.

Extension of the double track and automatic signalling continued with the Porirua to Mana section opened on 7 November 1960. The work involved harbour reclamation to construct a straight tack from Porirua to Papakōwhai, just south of Paremata, eliminating the tight curves as the former railway followed the coastline, and creating three lagoons on the eastern side of the harbour. The central lagoon, now known as Aotea Lagoon, remains but is reduced in size. From Paremata to Mana, the track was realigned to the West of the original track and a new double-track bridge was built across the entrance to the Pauatahanui Inlet. The original single-track railway bridge, built in 1885, was removed to allow room for the construction of a second road bridge in 2004. The railway stations at Porirua, Paremata, and Dolly Varden were replaced with new stations, with Dolly Varden station renamed Mana.

Mana to Plimmerton double track and automatic signalling were completed on 16 October 1961, completing the double track and automatic signalling from Wellington to South Junction, and allowing more frequent train services north of Porirua station. Crossovers at Plimmerton allowed some trains to terminate at Plimmerton and return to Wellington during peak periods.

By 2016, the introduction of electric multiple units with more rapid acceleration, EM/ET class from 1982 and Matangi FP class from 2010, had reduced rail travel time for stopping trains between Wellington and Porirua by another 6 minutes to 21 minutes, despite extra stops at Redwood, Linden, and Kenepuru which each add 48 seconds to the travel time. For non-stopping trains, the time had reduced to 17 minutes. Off-peak passenger services between Wellington and Porirua stations ran every thirty minutes, with more frequent services during peak periods and a less frequent during the night. From 15 July 2018, off-peak day services were increased to one every twenty minutes.

=== Road ===
Wellington and Porirua are linked by the Johnsonville–Porirua Motorway, part of State Highway 59 within Porirua and State Highway 1 beyond Porirua. Road improvements have progressively reduced travel times between Wellington and Porirua and increased the demand for housing development in Porirua. In 1940, the Centennial Highway developments saw the opening of a four-lane high-speed highway in Ngauranga Gorge bypassing the slower routes through Ngaio and Khandallah. During the 1950s, the high-speed Johnsonville–Porirua Motorway was built through Tawa on the eastern side of the valley. The first section from Johnsonville to the Tawa turnoff at Takapu Road at the southern entrance to Tawa opened on 15 December 1951, broadly following the line of the old North Island Main Trunk railway. It reduced road travel times and considerably improved access between Wellington and Porirua by eliminating the need to use the narrow, winding road through the bottom of the Tawa valley in the Glenside area. The second section, from Takapu Road to Porirua, opened about 1956 and allowed through traffic to bypass the lower speed road through Tawa. The Johnsonville bypass connecting the south end of the motorway to the top of Ngauranga Gorge opened about 1958, completing the four-lane road link between Wellington and Porirua.

On 3 October 1936, a road bridge was opened across the entrance to the Pauatahanui Inlet connecting Paremata to Dolly Varden, known as Mana from 1960, eliminating a 22-kilometre journey around Pauatahanui Inlet to Plimmerton. The bridge became part of State Highway 1 when Centennial Highway developments saw the completion of a highway from Pukerua Bay to Paekākāriki. A second bridge was built in 2004 allowing two lanes of traffic in each direction.

In the late 1960s, reclamation work began to the east of the 1960 rail reclamation from Porirua to Paremata, allowing the construction of a four-lane expressway alongside the railway. The expressway opened in the early 1970s, with room allowed for a future interchange at Whitford Brown Avenue. The reclamation work largely eliminated the north and south lagoons created by the rail reclamation on the east side of the harbour and reduced the size of the central lagoon, known as Aotea Lagoon. An intersection between SH 1 and Mungavin Avenue remained at Porirua until 1989 when the intersection was replaced with a grade-separated roundabout interchange with State Highway 1 (now State Highway 59) passing under the interchange.

The Transmission Gully Motorway was constructed between 2014 and 2021, providing an eastern bypass of Porirua. On 7 December 2021, shortly before its opening, SH 1 was shifted to the Transmission Gully Motorway and the former SH 1 route through Porirua was renumbered SH 59.

== Demographics ==
Porirua City covers 174.80 km^{2} (67.49 sq mi) and had an estimated population of 61,500 as of June 2025, with a population density of 352 people per km^{2}.

Historical population for the territorial area
Year	Pop.	±% p.a.
2006	48,546	—
2013	51,717	+0.91%
2018	56,559	+1.81%
2023	59,445	+1.00%

Porirua City had a population of 59,445 in the 2023 New Zealand census, an increase of 2,886 people (5.1%) since the 2018 census, and an increase of 7,728 people (14.9%) since the 2013 census. There were 29,052 males, 30,183 females and 210 people of other genders in 19,134 dwellings. 3.1% of people identified as LGBTIQ+. The median age was 35.9 years (compared with 38.1 years nationally). There were 13,128 people (22.1%) aged under 15 years, 11,352 (19.1%) aged 15 to 29, 27,252 (45.8%) aged 30 to 64, and 7,710 (13.0%) aged 65 or older.

Largest groups of overseas-born residents
Nationality	Population (2018)
Samoa	2,673
England	2,514
South Africa	870
Australia	783
India	627
Fiji	546
China	492
Philippines	378
Scotland	288
United States	249

People could identify as more than one ethnicity. The results were 60.1% European (Pākehā); 23.0% Māori; 26.5% Pasifika; 11.5% Asian; 1.6% Middle Eastern, Latin American and African New Zealanders (MELAA); and 1.8% other, which includes people giving their ethnicity as "New Zealander". English was spoken by 94.9%, Māori language by 5.8%, Samoan by 8.8% and other languages by 14.1%. No language could be spoken by 2.5% (e.g. too young to talk). New Zealand Sign Language was known by 0.7%. The percentage of people born overseas was 25.9, compared with 28.8% nationally.

Religious affiliations were 38.6% Christian, 2.0% Hindu, 1.4% Islam, 1.1% Māori religious beliefs, 1.2% Buddhist, 0.3% New Age, 0.1% Jewish, and 1.2% other religions. People who answered that they had no religion were 47.4%, and 6.9% of people did not answer the census question.

Of those at least 15 years old, 9,192 (19.8%) people had a bachelor's or higher degree, 23,664 (51.1%) had a post-high school certificate or diploma, and 10,509 (22.7%) people exclusively held high school qualifications. The median income was $47,200, compared with $41,500 nationally. 7,842 people (16.9%) earned over $100,000 compared to 12.1% nationally. The employment status of those at least 15 was that 25,401 (54.8%) people were employed full-time, 5,652 (12.2%) were part-time, and 1,689 (3.6%) were unemployed.

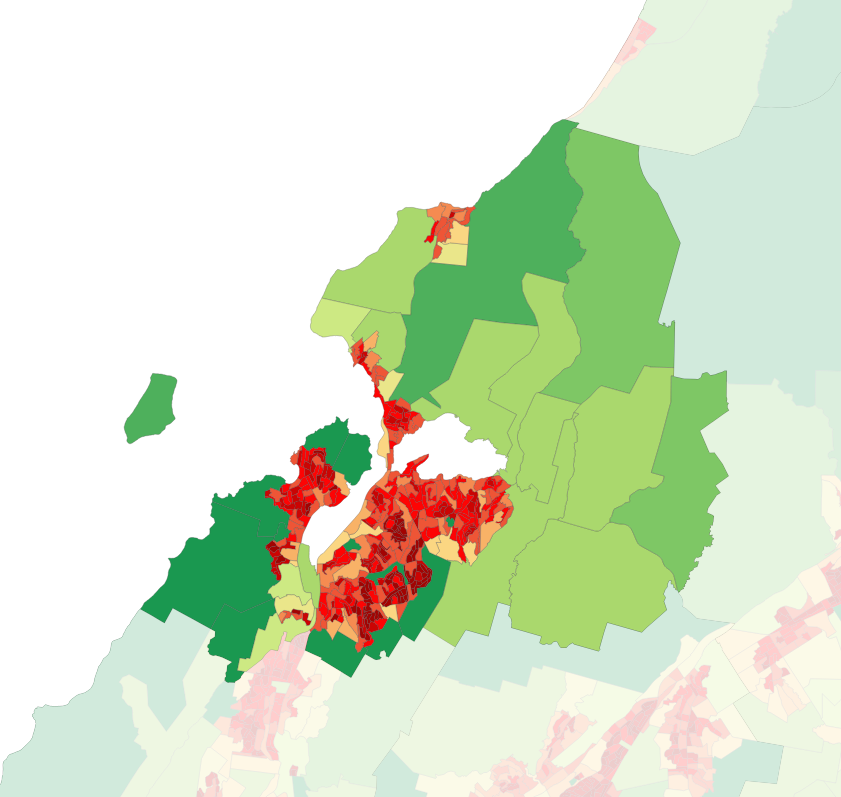
Population density in the 2023 census

Individual wards
Name	Area (km^{2})	Population	Density (per km^{2})	Dwellings	Median age	Median income
Pāuatahanui General Ward	133.45	24,000	180	8,469	40.5 years	$60,800
Onepoto General Ward	41.35	35,445	857	10,662	33.2 years	$39,200
New Zealand					38.1 years	$41,500

=== Urban area ===
Porirua's urban area covers 61.19 km^{2} (23.63 sq mi) and had an estimated population of 60,100 as of June 2025, with a population density of 982 people per km^{2}.

Historical population for the urban area
Year	Pop.	±% p.a.
2013	50,418	—
2018	55,218	+1.84%
2023	58,080	+1.02%

The urban area had a population of 58,080 in the 2023 New Zealand census, an increase of 2,862 people (5.2%) since the 2018 census, and an increase of 7,662 people (15.2%) since the 2013 census. There were 28,353 males, 29,517 females and 204 people of other genders in 18,663 dwellings. 3.1% of people identified as LGBTIQ+. The median age was 35.8 years (compared with 38.1 years nationally). There were 12,891 people (22.2%) aged under 15 years, 11,136 (19.2%) aged 15 to 29, 26,565 (45.7%) aged 30 to 64, and 7,491 (12.9%) aged 65 or older.

People could identify as more than one ethnicity. The results were 59.3% European (Pākehā); 23.3% Māori; 27.1% Pasifika; 11.7% Asian; 1.6% Middle Eastern, Latin American and African New Zealanders (MELAA); and 1.7% other, which includes people giving their ethnicity as "New Zealander". English was spoken by 94.9%, Māori language by 5.9%, Samoan by 9.0% and other languages by 14.2%. No language could be spoken by 2.5% (e.g. too young to talk). New Zealand Sign Language was known by 0.7%. The percentage of people born overseas was 26.0, compared with 28.8% nationally.

Religious affiliations were 38.9% Christian, 2.1% Hindu, 1.4% Islam, 1.1% Māori religious beliefs, 1.2% Buddhist, 0.3% New Age, 0.1% Jewish, and 1.2% other religions. People who answered that they had no religion were 47.0%, and 6.9% of people did not answer the census question.

Of those at least 15 years old, 8,946 (19.8%) people had a bachelor's or higher degree, 23,064 (51.0%) had a post-high school certificate or diploma, and 10,356 (22.9%) people exclusively held high school qualifications. The median income was $46,900, compared with $41,500 nationally. 7,491 people (16.6%) earned over $100,000 compared to 12.1% nationally. The employment status of those at least 15 was that 24,753 (54.8%) people were employed full-time, 5,475 (12.1%) were part-time, and 1,668 (3.7%) were unemployed.

== Local government ==
The city is administered by Porirua City Council. The wider Wellington Region is administered by the Greater Wellington Regional Council.

When New Zealand became a separate Colony from New South Wales in 1841, the royal charter established three provinces. The Porirua area became part of New Munster which included that part of the North Island south of the Patea River and the whole of the South Island. The British Parliament passed the first constitution act, the New Zealand Constitution Act 1846, which reformed the provinces and the Porirua area became part of New Ulster which now included all of the North Island. The provinces were reformed again when the New Zealand Constitution Act 1852 established six provinces, with Porirua included in the Wellington Province. In 1876, the provincial government was abolished and replaced with 36 borough councils and 63 county councils and the Porirua area became the Porirua Riding of the Hutt County, formed in 1877. The Hutt County covered all the area south of the Waikanae River and West of the Remutaka Ranges that lay outside of Wellington City. As the population of local areas grew, a number of local boroughs were split off from the Hutt County. In 1908, a smaller Makara County with offices in Porirua was formed from the Mākara and Porirua Ridings or the south-western part of the Hutt County. The new Makara County included Porirua, Tītahi Bay, Tawa Flat, and all of the area to the south lying to the west of Wellington City and outside the areas covered by Wellington City and the new and independent boroughs of Miramar, Karori, Onslow, and Johnsonville.

In 1939, northern Tawa valley residents seeking a separate name for the northern part of the Tawa district met and chose "Linden", from "Linden Vale", the name of the home of Mr Stuart Duncan and the name "Linden" was adopted in 1940. In 1948, the Tawa Flat and Linden Progressive Associations and Porirua interests, led by Arthur Carman and Percy Clark, made a representation to the Local Government Commission asking for a single borough covering the whole of the Porirua Basin. The Commission did not accept this proposal but responded by giving the Tawa Flat-Linden area the status of a Town District, with the first Tawa Flat Town Board elected on 16 May 1951. With continued urbanisation and population growth in the Tawa valley, the population reached 3,900 in 1953 and the upgrade of the Town District to a borough was approved in October 1953.

Rapid urbanisation and population growth was now occurring in the Porirua Basin with the development of state housing in Tītahi Bay, Elsdon, and to the East of State Highway 59, and in 1961 the first municipality to have "Porirua" in its name, the Borough of Porirua, was formed when Makara County was abolished, with the mostly rural western part becoming the Makara Ward of Hutt County and the rapidly growing eastern urban portion (including Tītahi Bay) becoming the Borough of Porirua. Four years later, the population was officially estimated at over the 20,000 threshold then necessary for Porirua to be declared a city.

On 1 April 1973, large areas to the north-east (and a few elsewhere) were transferred to the city from Hutt County by popular vote. Mana Island was added to the city at the same time. In 1988, a further addition was the Horokiri riding of the about-to-be-abolished county, containing most of the new Whitby suburb and substantial rural areas.

The city and its council have remained (with changes of personnel and ward boundaries) into the 21st century, despite proposals to change the name to "Mana" and several small movements for amalgamation with Wellington.

== Civic symbols ==
=== Coat of arms ===
Coat of arms of Porirua
Notes On 1 December 1965, Porirua City was granted a Coat of Arms. The Blazon is: Crest On a Wreath of the Colours in front of a Lymphad proper Sail set Pennon flying Gules Flags flying Azure a Whale proper. Escutcheon Vert two Piles Barry wavy of ten Argent and Azure Supporters On the dexter side a Private Soldier of the 58th Regiment of Foot in the uniform of the early Nineteenth Century and on the sinister side a Māori Warrior both proper. Motto Mo Te Katoa Nga Mahi (All That is Done is For the Benefit of All) Symbolism The shield is the most important part and is first described. "Vert" means green so that is the base colour of the shield, here representing the rural countryside when Porirua was first settled. A "pile" is a V-shaped object and there are two of them, symbolising the two arms of Porirua Harbour. The lines on the piles are "wavy" like the sea and are alternatively coloured silver ("argent") and blue ("azure"). The crest is the part above the shield, excluding the helmet. The whale and "lymphad" (sailing ship) represent whaling, which was an important early industry in the area, and the many ships that visited the harbour. The Supporters are the men on either side of the shield. The dexter side is the right from the shield carrier's point of view but to the left for an observer. The 58th Regiment of Foot spent time in the Porirua area in the nineteenth century, and the Māori warrior represents the long settlement of Māori in the area. The motto of "Mo Te Katoa Nga Mahi" may be translated as "All That is Done is For the Benefit of All".

=== Flag ===
Flag of Porirua

The city of Porirua first adopted a flag in 1978 following a competition for designs among local schools, with the winning design being submitted by John Mansfield of Papakowhai School. This flag consisted of a yellow cross on a green background with the coat of arms superimposed over it. After the 1989 local government reforms, the new Porirua City Council did not seek to continue use of this flag.

The present flag of Porirua was adopted on 30 September 1998. It has several blue stripes, and a green shape to symbolise the city's harbour and land. The canton optionally features the coat of arms.

== Suburbs ==
Porirua is largely formed around the arms of the Porirua Harbour, and the coastline facing out to Cook Strait and the north-eastern parts of the South Island. Most of the populated areas of Porirua are coastal: Camborne, Karehana Bay, Mana, Onepoto, Papakōwhai, Paremata, Pāuatahanui, Plimmerton, Pukerua Bay, Takapūwāhia, Tītahi Bay and Whitby all have direct access to coastal parks and recreation reserves. Several suburbs without direct coastal access, including Aotea, Ascot Park and Ranui Heights, have substantial portions with good views over the harbour. Elsdon, formerly known as Prosser Block, lost access to the harbour as a result of reclamation work, especially during the 1960s. Much of the existing city centre, north of Parumoana Street and east of Titahi Bay Road, was built upon this landfill.

The suburbs include the following, grouped by council ward:

=== Onepoto ===
- Rangituhi / Colonial Knob
- Elsdon – named after writer Elsdon Best
- Kenepuru – industrial area south-west of the centre, adjoining Linden
- Mana Island
- Onepoto – Locality, part of the suburb of Tītahi Bay
- Porirua City Centre – Porirua's central business district
- Takapūwāhia – a Ngāti Toa settlement
- Tītahi Bay – where pro golfer Michael Campbell grew up
- Aotea
- Ascot Park
- Cannons Creek
- Rānui
- Waitangirua

=== Pāuatahanui ===
- Camborne
- Hongoeka – a Ngāti Toa settlement
- Judgeford – a rural locality
- Karehana Bay – Locality
- Mana – Locality
- Paekākāriki Hill
- Papakōwhai – a locality where kōwhai trees are prominent on headlands
- Paremata – probably named after Sydney's Parramatta
- Pāuatahanui
- Plimmerton – named for a director of the railway company
- Pukerua Bay – where film-maker Peter Jackson grew up
- Whitby – street names commemorate James Cook

== Commerce ==
North City Shopping Centre (originally Kmart Plaza and then North City Plaza) is Porirua's largest indoor shopping complex. The two-level mall first opened in 1990, was extended in 1996 and was refurbished in 2004. With over 80 stores, the centre includes Wellington's first Kmart department store, which opened in the mall as an anchor tenant in 1990.

The Megacentre shopping complex in Porirua opened in November 1999.

Before North City and the Megacentre were built, shopping centred around the Cobham Court area of central Porirua. In 1996, large white canopies were erected over Cobham Court, Serlby Place and Harham Place to freshen up the area and provide protection from the weather. The project cost $4.2 million and won three architectural awards. Judges for the awards described the canopies as "spare, crisp, potent and elegant" with "rich cultural and architectural relevance." The canopies were removed in 2015 as part of a major revitalisation project by Porirua City Council. A report to the Council in 2017 stated that crime in the area had decreased by 25% after the canopies were removed.

== Transport ==
State Highway 59 is the main route through Porirua itself, passes north–south through the middle of the city, linking Porirua southwards to Wellington and northwards to the Kāpiti Coast and the bulk of the North Island. Porirua is the northern terminus of the Johnsonville–Porirua motorway (opened progressively from 1950), with the section of motorway within Porirua being part of the SH 59 route. Until 7 December 2021, the SH 59 route was part of State Highway 1.

State Highway 1, the most significant route in the New Zealand state highway network, forms an eastern bypass of Porirua as the Transmission Gully Motorway. There are link roads between the Transmission Gully Motorway and Kenepuru, Waitangirua and Whitby. State Highway 58 links Paremata via Whitby and Pāuatahanui (where an interchange with the Transmission Gully Motorway is located) with Haywards in the Hutt Valley to the east. The Ara Harakeke is a pathway that runs alongside SH 59 and the Taupō Swamp, north of Plimmerton. The first section was opened in 2002. Porirua City Council won a Cycle Friendly Award for this project from the Cycling Advocates' Network in 2003.

The North Island Main Trunk railway line passes through Porirua, mostly close to State Highway 59, with six stations including the main Porirua Railway Station inside the city and one on the Wellington City border. The railway stations from south to north are Kenepuru, Porirua, Paremata, Mana (known as Dolly Varden before 1960), Plimmerton, Pukerua Bay, and Muri (closed 30 April 2011). Kāpiti Line suburban passenger trains run between Wellington and Waikanae (generally half-hourly during the day before 15 July 2018 and every twenty minutes during the day after that date, more frequently during peak periods, and less frequently at night). The Northern Explorer long-distance passenger train between Auckland and Wellington passes through Porirua. This train was known as the Overlander before 25 June 2012 which stopped southbound but not northbound.

The nearest airports are Wellington Airport to the south (the closest), and Paraparaumu Airport to the north.

Ferry services ran between Paremata and Picton for short periods but appeared unable to compete with Wellington-based services despite the shorter distance.

== Education ==
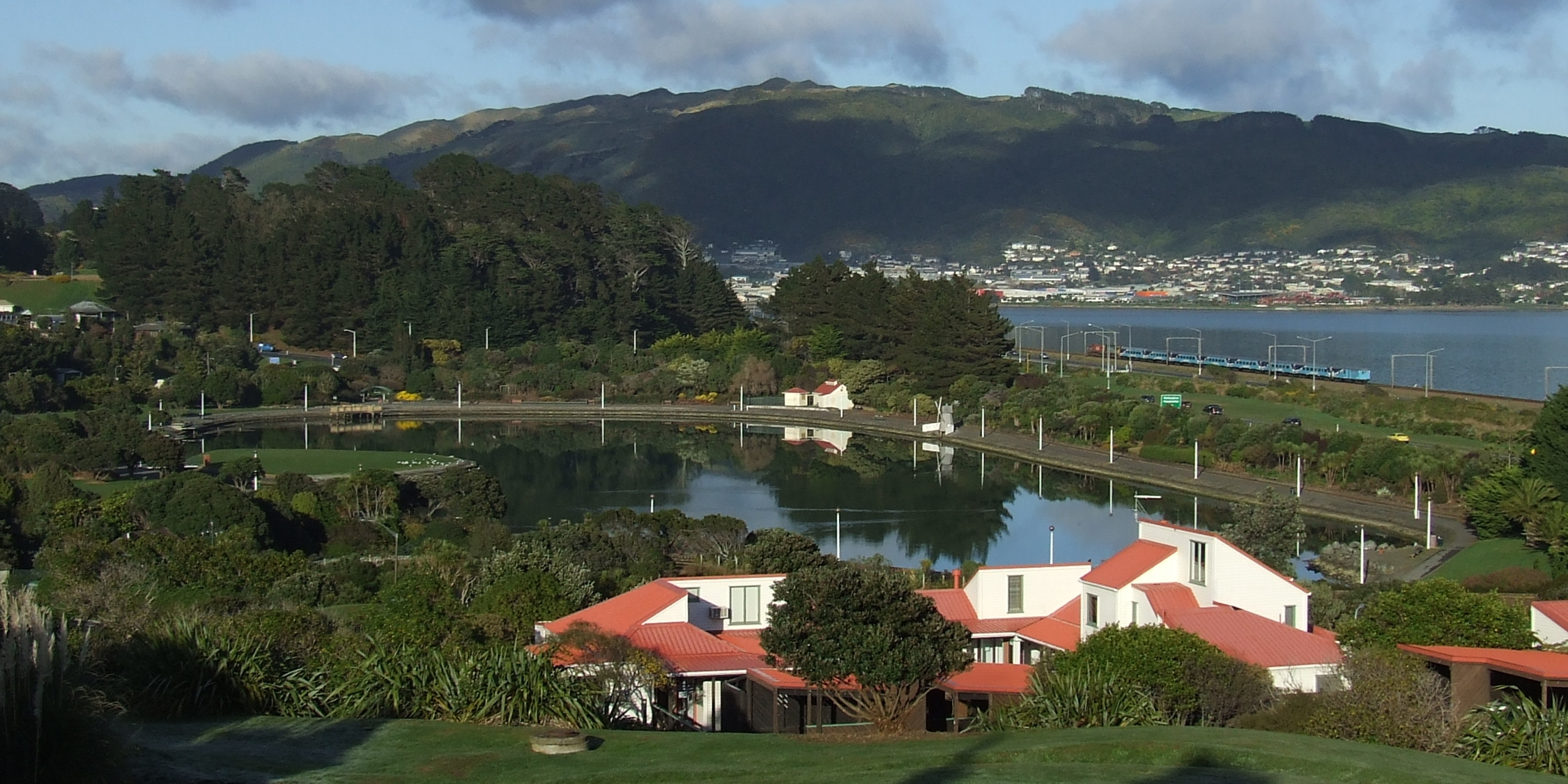
Police College chalets above the Aotea Lagoon, with Rangituhi/Colonial Knob on the skyline above the city centre (obscured) and Elsdon and Takapūwāhia

The Royal New Zealand Police College, where all the country's police recruits receive some 19 weeks' training, is at Papakōwhai.

Just up the road from Aotea Lagoon is Aotea College, the secondary school closest to the northern suburbs. Other colleges include Mana College and Bishop Viard College near the city centre and to the east, Porirua College. Tertiary education is provided by Whitireia Polytechnic, which has its main campus north of the city centre.

== Arts and culture ==
The local culture, history and artists are represented at the Pātaka Museum of Arts & Cultures where the library is also public library is also housed.

The indie rock radio station andHow.FM broadcasts locally at 107.5 FM from the suburb of Papakōwhai.

== Sport and recreation ==
Te Rauparaha Arena is a multi-purpose venue for sports and events located next to Pātaka Museum of Arts & Cultures. Nearby is the Porirua Skatepark designed by local Moses Viliamu. Aotea Lagoon is a popular recreational area on the south-eastern shore of the Porirua Inlet.

Watersports, fishing and other boating activities are common in the area, served by a large marina in Mana and Sea Scouts, yachting, power-boating, rowing, and water-skiing clubs. The harbour entrance from Plimmerton or Mana is popular with experienced windsurfers and kitesurfers while beginners find the shallow, enclosed waters of the Pauatahanui arm of the harbour a forgiving environment in which to develop their skills.

As early as 1883, Porirua began to hold regular horse racing events on the harbour's Southern beach. Towards the end of a meeting, competing riders would also have to combat the incoming tide. The Porirua Jockey Club was quickly established with Mr W. Jillett the first secretary and local butcher, John Rod, the treasurer. Joshua Prosser built stables on his nearby property 'Prosser Block' (now Elsdon) and became a notable trainer of Dominion race-horses. The beach now lies beneath Porirua city centre.

Porirua is home to the powerful Northern United RFC, the current Wellington regional champions, and the smaller Paremata-Plimmerton RFC. Both clubs play in the Wellington Rugby Football Union club rugby competition. Northern United RFC are based locally at Jerry Collins Stadium.

Since 2023, the Wellington Phoenix FC Women of the A-League Women have also been based at Jerry Collins Stadium.

Porirua is also home to the three-time Chatham Cup winning Capital Football team Western Suburbs FC. Well known as a dominant force in New Zealand club football, and for producing many former and current All Whites, they were officially recognised as Porirua City's 2006 Team of the Year for their Chatham Cup Grand Final triumph over Auckland's Eastern Suburbs.

Porirua was the host of the 2010 Oceania Handball Championship. Australia won the tournament from hosts New Zealand. The Cook Islands finished third.

A branch of Adrenalin Forest, an adventure park where paying visitors navigate rope bridges, swings and flying foxes strung between trees up to 31 metres off the ground, opened in Porirua in 2010. The park is located on the east side of Porirua Harbour near the Gear Homestead.

== Notable people ==
Notable councillors of Porirua have included:

- Whitford Brown (first mayor)
- Ken Douglas (trade unionist)
- Ken Gray (All Black)
- Gary McCormick (media personality)
- Helen Smith (first member of the Values Party to be elected to local government)
- Duncan Paia'aua (Rugby Union Player)
- Tutu Wineera (kaumatua of the Ngāti Toa iwi)

Other prominent residents have included:

- Aaradhna (R&B singer)
- Alistair Campbell, poet
- Michael Campbell (golfer)
- Jerry Collins (All Black)
- Sophie Devine (cricketer)
- Tamati Ellison (All Black)
- Craig Garner (cricketer)
- Vince Mellars (rugby league player)
- Frank Moore (politician)
- Heremaia Ngata (All White football player)
- TJ Perenara (All Black and Hurricanes Vice-Captain)
- Paul Rauhihi (rugby league player)
- Mike Riddell (writer)
- Emmett Skilton (film and television actor)
- PJ Solomon (rugby internationalist for Scotland)
- Rodney So'oialo (All Black)
- Tāmairangi (19th-century Ngāti Ira leader)
- Ramon Te Wake (transgender presenter and singer-songwriter)
- Renouf To'omaga (Canterbury Bulldogs)
- Ela To'omaga-Kaikilekofe (visual artist and arts administrator)

== Climate ==
Climate data for Cannons Creek, Porirua (1971–2000)
Month	Jan	Feb	Mar	Apr	May	Jun	Jul	Aug	Sep	Oct	Nov	Dec	Year
Mean daily maximum °C (°F)	20.7 (69.3)	20.9 (69.6)	19.7 (67.5)	17.3 (63.1)	14.9 (58.8)	12.8 (55.0)	12.2 (54.0)	12.7 (54.9)	13.8 (56.8)	15.4 (59.7)	17.0 (62.6)	18.9 (66.0)	16.4 (61.4)
Daily mean °C (°F)	16.9 (62.4)	17.0 (62.6)	16.0 (60.8)	13.8 (56.8)	11.5 (52.7)	9.6 (49.3)	9.0 (48.2)	9.4 (48.9)	10.5 (50.9)	12.0 (53.6)	13.5 (56.3)	15.3 (59.5)	12.9 (55.2)
Mean daily minimum °C (°F)	13.0 (55.4)	13.0 (55.4)	12.2 (54.0)	10.3 (50.5)	8.0 (46.4)	6.5 (43.7)	5.7 (42.3)	6.0 (42.8)	7.2 (45.0)	8.6 (47.5)	10.0 (50.0)	11.7 (53.1)	9.4 (48.8)
Average rainfall mm (inches)	88 (3.5)	65 (2.6)	95 (3.7)	95 (3.7)	124 (4.9)	137 (5.4)	131 (5.2)	120 (4.7)	100 (3.9)	93 (3.7)	79 (3.1)	83 (3.3)	1,210 (47.7)
Source: NIWA

== Sister-city relationships ==
=== Sister City ===
- Blacktown
- Nishio

=== Friendly City ===
- Bamiyan
- Yangzhou

=== Twin City ===
- Whitby

== See also ==
- Fort Parramatta
- Upper Hutt
- Lower Hutt
- Wellington
- Kāpiti Coast
