= Hongoeka =

- Suburb
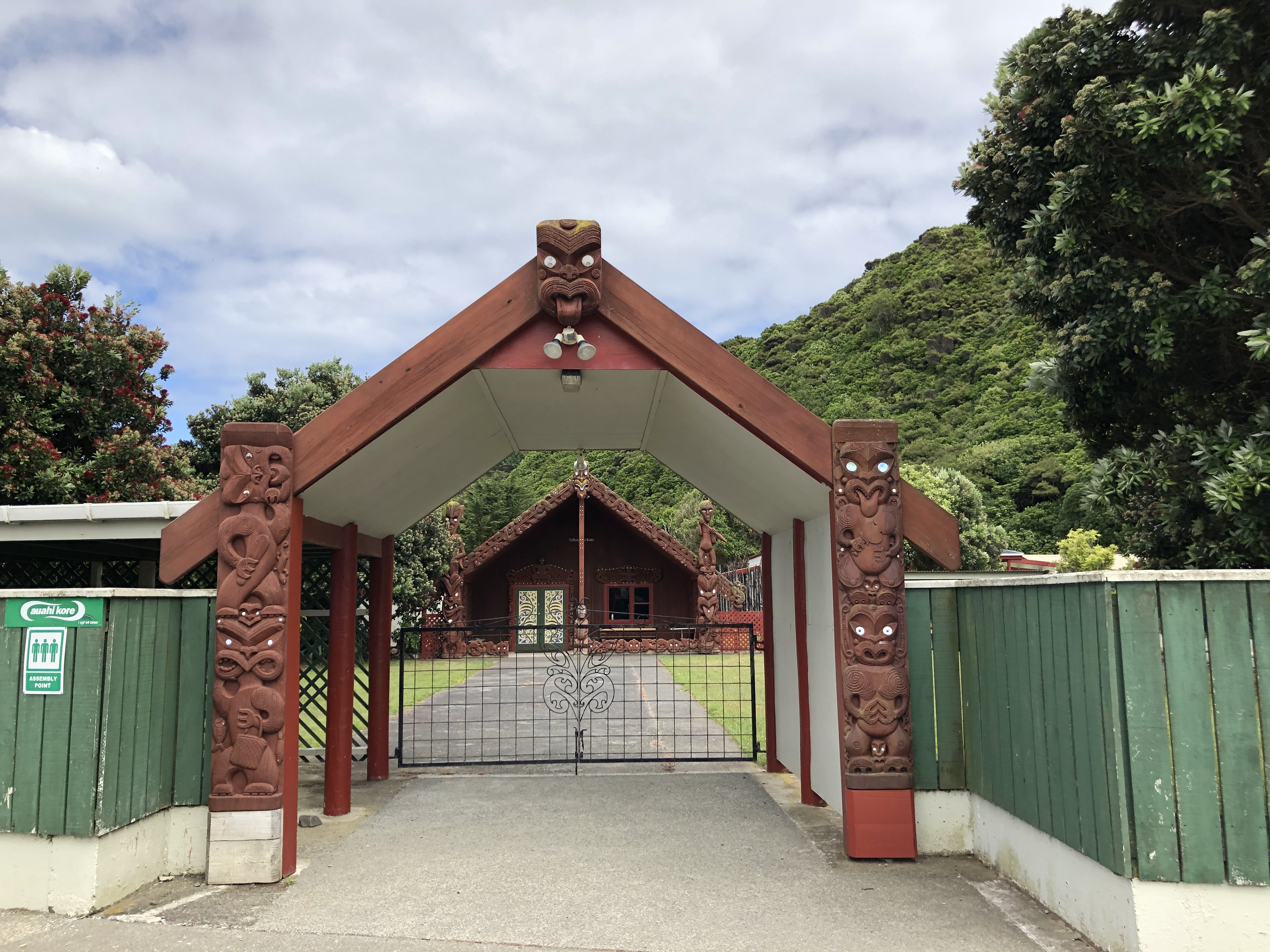
- Hongoeka Marae
- Interactive map of Hongoeka
- Coordinates: 41°3′58.13″S 174°51′5.55″E
- Country: New Zealand
- City: Porirua
- Local authority: Porirua City Council
- Electoral ward: Pāuatahanui General Ward; Porirua Māori Ward

Area
  - Land: 166 ha (410 acres)

Population (2023 census)
  - Total: 135
  - Density: 81.3/km^{2} (211/sq mi)

	Pukerua Bay
Porirua Harbour	Hongoeka
	Porirua Harbour	Plimmerton

Hongoeka is a community in the city of Porirua in New Zealand. It is northwest of Plimmerton and adjacent to Hongoeka Bay. It extends from an urupā (cemetery) boundary at the end of Moana Road, to Haukōpua (commonly known as Big Bay). A residential area is situated in Hongoeka Bay itself and takes up flat land and lower hillsides. It is bordered by bush clad hills and farmland, and looks out over a broad sweep of rugged coastline towards Whitireia and Mana Island, and to the South Island beyond.

Writer Patricia Grace lives in the area.

== History ==
Hongoeka has likely been occupied by Ngāti Toa since the 1820s (possibly since the battle of Waiorua in 1824, which secured Te Rauparaha's position on Kapiti Island). Hongoeka was considered desirable for cultivation and for the abundance of kai moana (seafood) found on nearby shores. According to the Maori Land Court minutes, Te Rauparaha gave the Hongoeka lands to his older brother Watarauhi Nohorua and his wife Miriama Te Wainokenoke and her relatives of Ngāti Haumia hapu of Ngāti Toa.

The village was visited by missionary Octavius Hadfield in 1839, and by Thomas Bevan in 1844, who wrote that "climbing the long spur from above Plimmerton beneath us on the beach we saw the old-time kaingas (sic) – Hongoeka, Motuhara and Turikawera".

Some Ngāti Toa retreated to Hongoeka after the Wairau Affray. Government Official Clarke reported that on 16 August 1843, Acting Governor Shortland met with Te Rauparaha, Rawiri Puaha and all Ngāti Toa from the Cloudy Bay area at Hongoeka immediately after the incident.

Hongoeka formed part of one of three reserves set aside “for the perpetual benefit of Ngāti Toa” (Porirua Deed 1847) following the Crown’s acquisition of Porirua in 1847.

Hongoeka was gazetted as an official geographic name (locality) on 16 December 2010.

=== Marae ===
The suburb features Hongoeka Marae, a meeting place for Ngāti Toa. Its wharenui, Te Heke-mai-raro, opened in 1997.

== Demographics ==
Hongoeke covers 1.66 km^{2} (0.64 sq mi). It is part of the larger Plimmerton statistical area.

Historical population
Year	Pop.	±% p.a.
2006	120	—
2013	99	−2.71%
2018	114	+2.86%
2023	135	+3.44%

Hongoeka had a population of 135 in the 2023 New Zealand census, an increase of 21 people (18.4%) since the 2018 census, and an increase of 36 people (36.4%) since the 2013 census. There were 60 males, 72 females, and 3 people of other genders in 45 dwellings. 4.4% of people identified as LGBTIQ+. The median age was 36.4 years (compared with 38.1 years nationally). There were 21 people (15.6%) aged under 15 years, 30 (22.2%) aged 15 to 29, 48 (35.6%) aged 30 to 64, and 33 (24.4%) aged 65 or older.

People could identify as more than one ethnicity. The results were 42.2% European (Pākehā), 82.2% Māori, 4.4% Pasifika, and 4.4% Asian. English was spoken by 95.6%, Māori by 33.3%, and other languages by 4.4%. No language could be spoken by 2.2% (e.g. too young to talk). The percentage of people born overseas was 6.7, compared with 28.8% nationally.

Religious affiliations were 26.7% Christian, 4.4% Hindu, 4.4% Māori religious beliefs, and 2.2% other religions. People who answered that they had no religion were 55.6%, and 6.7% of people did not answer the census question.

Of those at least 15 years old, 21 (18.4%) people had a bachelor's or higher degree, 78 (68.4%) had a post-high school certificate or diploma, and 18 (15.8%) people exclusively held high school qualifications. The median income was $44,000, compared with $41,500 nationally. 9 people (7.9%) earned over $100,000 compared to 12.1% nationally. The employment status of those at least 15 was 57 (50.0%) full-time, 12 (10.5%) part-time, and 3 (2.6%) unemployed.
