= Camborne, New Zealand =

Suburb of Porirua

Coordinates: 41.089683°S 174.873573°E

Camborne
- Suburb
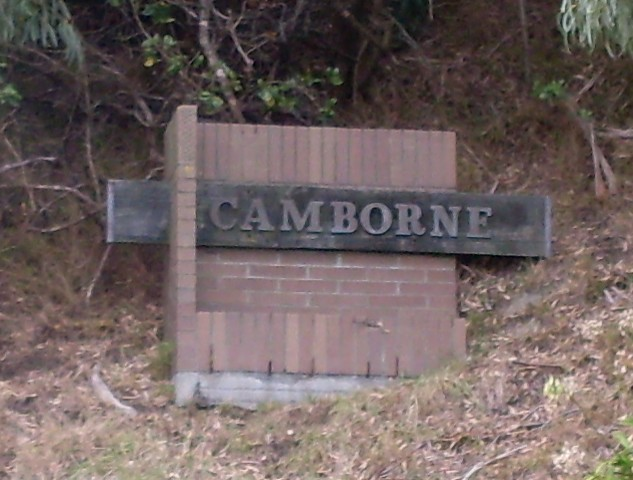
- Interactive map of Camborne
- Country: New Zealand
- City: Porirua City
- Local authority: Porirua City Council
- Electoral ward: Pāuatahanui General Ward; Porirua Māori Ward

Area
  - Land: 84 ha (210 acres)

Population (June 2025)
  - Total: 2,050
  - Density: 2,400/km^{2} (6,300/sq mi)

	Pukerua Bay
Plimmerton	Camborne	(Porirua Harbour)
	Mana

Camborne, New Zealand is a hilltop and seaside suburb of Porirua.

Camborne covers an area of 0.84 km², including a land area of 0.84 km². Most of the suburb is a short walk from Porirua Harbour, and many homes have views of the harbour, neighbouring hills, the sea and Mana Island.

== History ==
Camborne was developed over a 35-year period from the 1960s, initially by an investment company headed by a Mr Arthur Cornish. It was named after Camborne in Cornwall. Most of its street names are of Cornish origin, but its main street, Pope Street, is named after William George Pope (known as Bob), who was an honoured former resident of the adjoining suburb of Plimmerton.

The Paremata Residents Association includes members from Camborne.

== Description ==
Camborne a residential suburb without any schools, commercial, or industrial buildings.

== Demography ==
Camborne statistical area covers 0.84 km^{2} (0.32 sq mi). It had an estimated population of 2,050 as of June 2025, with a population density of 2,440 people per km^{2}.

Historical population
Year	Pop.	±% p.a.
2006	1,665	—
2013	1,908	+1.97%
2018	2,013	+1.08%
2023	2,025	+0.12%

Camborne had a population of 2,025 in the 2023 New Zealand census, an increase of 12 people (0.6%) since the 2018 census, and an increase of 117 people (6.1%) since the 2013 census. There were 966 males, 1,056 females, and 6 people of other genders in 729 dwellings. 3.7% of people identified as LGBTIQ+. The median age was 40.9 years (compared with 38.1 years nationally). There were 414 people (20.4%) aged under 15 years, 300 (14.8%) aged 15 to 29, 1,017 (50.2%) aged 30 to 64, and 291 (14.4%) aged 65 or older.

People could identify as more than one ethnicity. The results were 88.0% European (Pākehā); 12.1% Māori; 5.2% Pasifika; 8.1% Asian; 1.8% Middle Eastern, Latin American and African New Zealanders (MELAA); and 2.2% other, which includes people giving their ethnicity as "New Zealander". English was spoken by 97.5%, Māori by 2.7%, Samoan by 1.3%, and other languages by 11.0%. No language could be spoken by 1.9% (e.g. too young to talk). New Zealand Sign Language was known by 1.2%. The percentage of people born overseas was 23.3, compared with 28.8% nationally.

Religious affiliations were 30.1% Christian, 1.3% Hindu, 0.6% Islam, 0.3% Māori religious beliefs, 0.7% Buddhist, 0.3% New Age, and 1.0% other religions. People who answered that they had no religion were 59.6%, and 6.1% of people did not answer the census question.

Of those at least 15 years old, 582 (36.1%) people had a bachelor's or higher degree, 801 (49.7%) had a post-high school certificate or diploma, and 237 (14.7%) people exclusively held high school qualifications. The median income was $63,400, compared with $41,500 nationally. 456 people (28.3%) earned over $100,000 compared to 12.1% nationally. The employment status of those at least 15 was 978 (60.7%) full-time, 207 (12.8%) part-time, and 33 (2.0%) unemployed.

In 2018, 11.5% of the workforce worked in construction, 9.0% worked in education, 8.7% worked in healthcare, 3.8% worked in manufacturing, 3.8% worked in hospitality, and 2.8% worked in transport.

As of 2018, among those who commute to work, 71.0% drove a car, 11.3% rode in a car, 2.7% used a bike, and 2.7% walked or ran. No one used public transport.

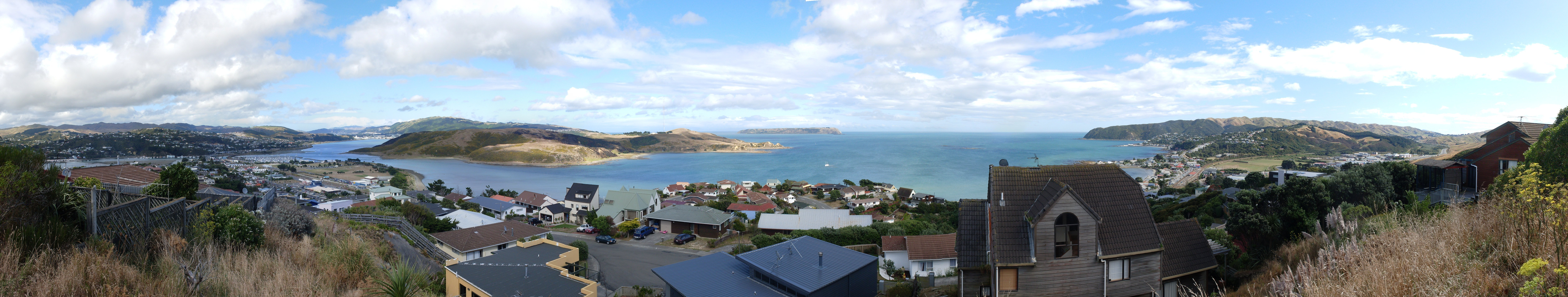
The extensive views of Porirua Harbour and the sea from Camborne. Mana Island is in the centre; Plimmerton to the right. Pauatahaunui Inlet is at the left.
