= Taupō Swamp =

Swamp in New Zealand

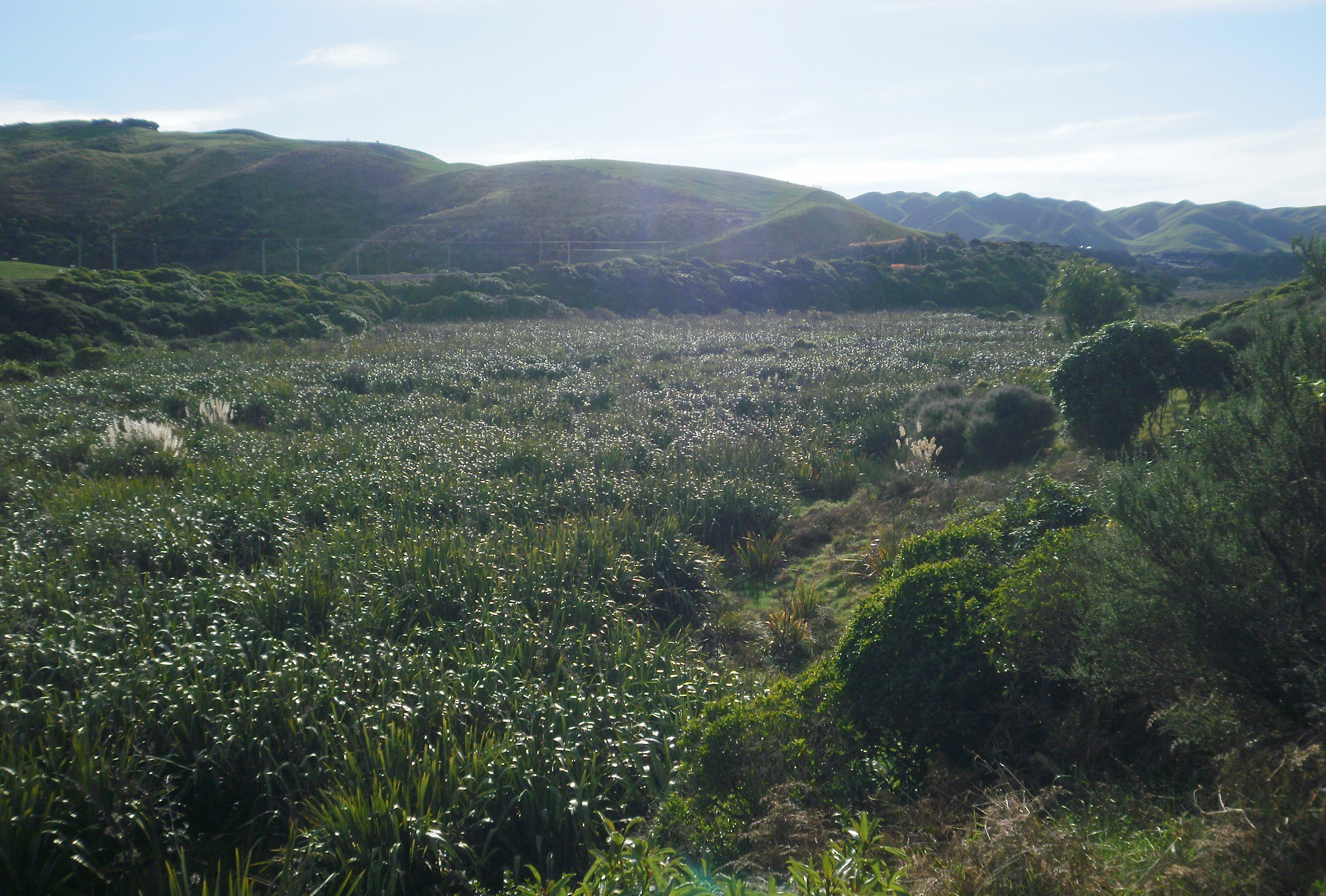

- Location within New Zealand
- Location: 3km north of Plimmerton
- Coordinates: 41°05′S 174°52′E
- Type: Swamp
- Managing agency: Queen Elizabeth II National Trust
- Designation: Queen Elizabeth II National Trust covenanted area
- Website: https://www.tauposwamp.org/

Taupō Swamp is a lowland freshwater swamp located three kilometres (1.9 mi) north of Plimmerton and 20 kilometres (12 mi) north-northeast of Wellington. In 1986 the Queen Elizabeth II National Trust purchased Taupō Swamp with the aim of both protecting and restoring the wetland. Taupō Swamp is home to largely indigenous vegetation including sedges, flax, ferns, shrubs, herbaceous plants, and grasses. Flax leaves shelter and shade the swamp providing a habitat that is favourable for eels and native fish including galaxiid species. There are invasive plant species present that threaten the swamp including Darwin's barberry, blackberry, gorse, broom, pussy willow and Japanese honeysuckle. Another possible threat is development of nearby land as this may cause silt to run off into the swamp as well as fire.

== Description ==
Taupō Swamp is an approximately 25-hectare (62-acre) lowland freshwater swamp, classified as a topogeneous mire, located three kilometres (1.9 mi) north of Plimmerton and 20 kilometres (12 mi) north-northeast of Wellington City, New Zealand. It is regarded as being one of the few Wellington wetland areas to retain its mainly indigenous plant life.

== History ==
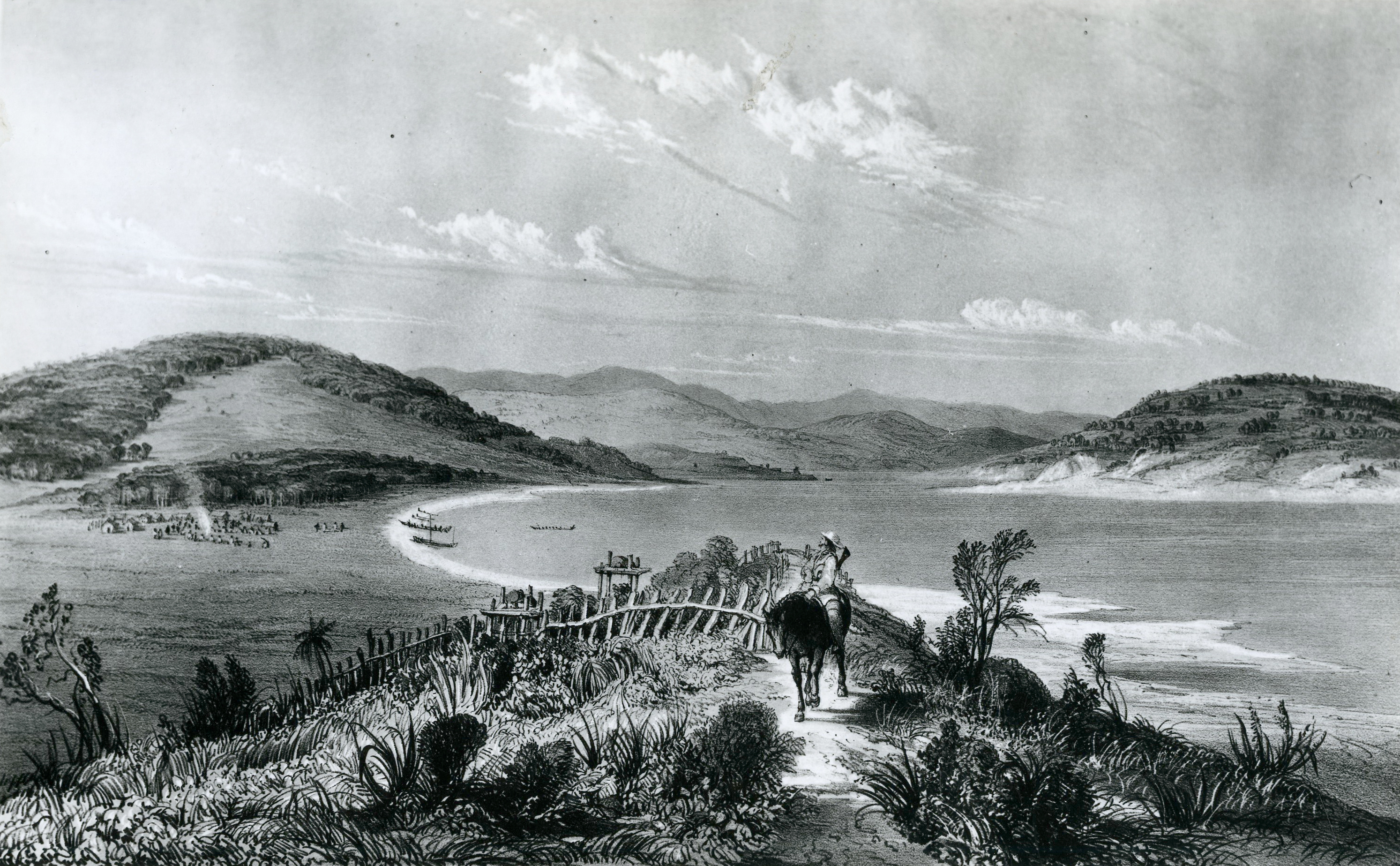
View of Taupō kainga from the Taua Tapu (Pukerua) Track, Plimmerton

=== Pre-European history ===
Taupō Swamp was included in the area that was settled from 1824 by the Ngāti Toa Rangatira people after having won battles against local iwi. During this time the area was a salt water lagoon and an inlet of Porirua harbour. The wider area was used by Māori for mahinga kai (food cultivation and gathering).

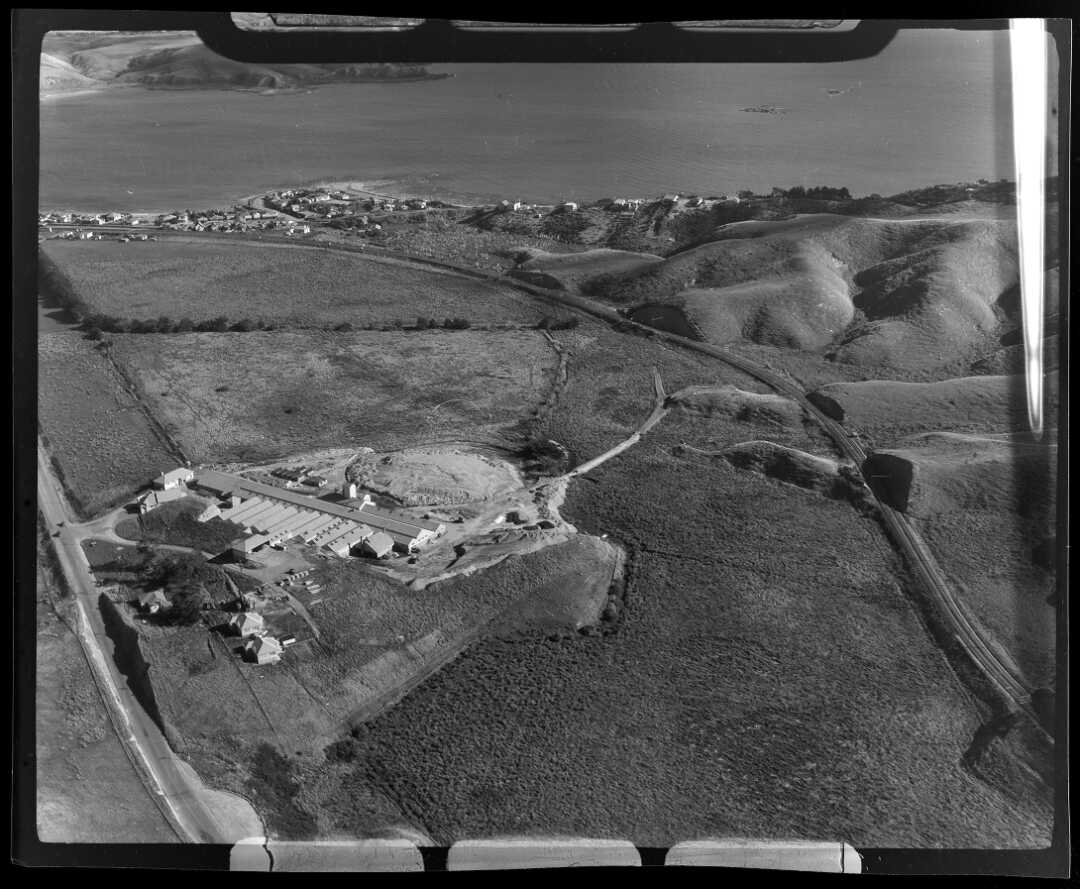
Southern end of Taupō Swamp in 1947 showing farm paddocks and a tile factory.

=== European settlement ===
In 1855 an earthquake uplifted the land and this, along with the subsequent increase in silt, ensured that the swamp was cut off from the sea. The swamp was and continues to be fed by the Taupō stream and as a result the swamp is now regarded as a topogenous mire. By the late 1800s flax was planted and industrially harvested out of the swamp and milled in Foxton. This continued until the mid 1900s as attempts to drain the swamp for farmland use were largely unsuccessful. However some southern parts of the swamp were successfully drained allowing for industrial as well as farmland use. Both the construction of the main trunk railway in 1885 and the later construction of the Centennial Highway threatened the wetland but as a result of the peaty soils, both infrastructures were built around the edges of the swamp. However these structures did result in some of the smaller areas of the swamp becoming isolated. The swamp is visible from State Highway 59 (formerly State Highway 1) and the North Island Main Trunk railway.

== Queen Elizabeth II National Trust ==
In 1986 the Queen Elizabeth II National Trust purchased Taupō Swamp with the aim of both protecting and restoring the wetland. It was after this purchase that the QEII Trust were able to secure the swamp from grazing by livestock.

== Fauna and flora ==
Taupō Swamp is home to largely indigenous vegetation including sedges, flax, ferns, shrubs, herbaceous plants, and introduced grasses. Flax leaves shelter and shade the swamp providing a habitat that is favourable for eels and native fish including galaxiid species.

== Invasive species and threats ==
There are invasive plant species present that threaten the swamp including Darwin's barberry, Blackberry, Gorse, Broom, Pussy Willow and Japanese honeysuckle. Another possible threat is development of nearby land. It is proposed that nearby agricultural land be converted to residential use. The result of this development may cause an increase in a build up of silt during the construction phase and increased stormwater run-off once the construction is complete.
