= The Beatgirls =

New Zealand girl group

The Beatgirls, a New Zealand girl group formed in 1996, performs covers of musical hits from different eras, with appropriate dance moves, glamorous costumes, and slyly racy banter between songs, in full cabaret shows or as hired entertainment for festivals and parties. While not a franchise, over the years, different trios of women have brought The Beatgirls' trademark humor, glamor, and musical talent to life around the world as well as across New Zealand, developing a degree of acceptance and cultural status across New Zealand's various social groups akin to that of the Topp Twins, even though their music is "pretty largely based on American or British music," according to co-founder Andrea Sanders.

While they are often referred to as The Beat Girls, even on their own official website, they most consistently bill themselves as The Beatgirls, including on their Facebook page.

== Cultural significance ==
Corporate-sponsored shows for employees are the main breadwinner for the group in New Zealand, but they're also popular draw cards for national events such as the Golden Shears. They appear at public and private venues, from local pubs, community centers, charity events, and retirement homes, to urban theaters and festivals. They have performed at Wellington's Circa Theatre since their inception, including, for example, the entire month of October in 2010. As Sanders says, "We go from highbrow corporate dos to someone's wedding in a small marquee; from the Martinborough Wine and Food Festival with a crowd of 10,000 people to the Eketāhuna firemen's ball, where everyone was dancing in their socks."

They are also familiar to New Zealand television audiences through their appearances on shows such as Good Morning and Dancing with the Stars. They have been profiled, interviewed, and featured on numerous other series about contemporary arts in New Zealand, e.g., Dream Jobs (2000), Wanda's Way (TVNZ, 2003), Big Night In (2003), Sunday (TVNZ, 2005), and Radio New Zealand Concert Programme's Upbeat (2017). They were also part of a live broadcast of an international comedy festival, The TV2 International LAUGH! Festival in 2002.

The Beatgirls have toured internationally around Europe, Asia, and the United States, as well as many of the Pacific islands. They have represented New Zealand overseas at major international events, including parties sponsored by Sports Illustrated at the 2000 and 2004 Olympics in Australia and Greece, a fact that led Grant Buist's popular Wellington-based cartoon strip, Jitterati, to express relief, contrasting their public persona with that of a contemporary New Zealand artwork sent abroad to a prestigious international arts event. After one of their performances in Greece Katie Couric booked them for an appearance on The Today Show.

The Beatgirls are based in Wellington, where the local newspaper has called them "as Wellington as the bucket fountain." In 2006 the Beatgirls were in competition with Weta Workshop for various regional and national awards (Richard Taylor won). Sanders, acting the part of a fantasy character named Diello in Peter Jackson's Heavenly Creatures (1994), got to play a love scene with Kate Winslet; in later years Jackson has hired the Beatgirls to entertain at parties.

== Style ==
Like the Topp Twins, the Beatgirls appeal to audiences because of their "energy, timing, humour and crowd interaction." They peg their selection of music to their audience's age, choosing music from the latter's teenage years. They appeal to audience nostalgia, but with enough edge that they have sometimes been called a "parody trio," although Sanders objects to that characterization: "We don't take the mickey out of the songs - it's just we don't take ourselves too seriously." While The Beatgirls began with music from the post-WWII era, when they expanded to '40s music, particularly from the Andrews Sisters, they became a hit at Anzac ceremonies and retirement homes; at the latter they have often performed for free.

The Beatgirls "are unashamedly 'entertainers.'" Sanders sees this as an advantage financially in the New Zealand entertainment world, her term for the group is "heavy weight light entertainment". Being able to reach a wide audience of all ages is key.

== Origins and personnel ==
The group's origins lie in the personal relationship between Andrea Sanders and Billy Watkins, who were born near Wellington in Plimmerton and Paekākāriki respectively. After performing as a dancer and then a singer in Australia, Sanders returned to Wellington and joined Watkins' band called Billy and the Blue Flames, which played music in the style of Cab Calloway. In 1994 they set up a band called the Lounge Lizards to play bossa nova but in 1996 they soon found their way to the more lucrative Beatgirls format. Sanders is the group's co-owner, co-manager, choreographer, and one of the group's lead singers; Watkins is the co-founder and was in the original backing band however has not performed with the group since 2015. It was Watkins who created the idea of using backing tracks and losing the live band which then allowed the group to travel internationally - Sydney Olympics in 2000 and Athens Olympics 2004.

This led to the group being hired to perform in the USA after appearing in The Today Show with events for Sports Illustrated, General Motors, Dana Faber foundation, TAP Excalibur. Florida Bankers and others.

The concept of the vocal trio was hatched in a show written by Sanders called 'Blame it on the Bossa Nova which debuted at Downstage Theatre in Wellington - this show was produced by her long term dance partner Sally Stopforth. The name 'The BeatGirls' was inspired by a 60's cult movie called 'BeatGirl' [music by Adam Faith] and it was Watkins who came up with the idea to form a new group which only played music by The Beatles. However after a couple of years the repertoire expanded to include 60's girl group [Phil Spector, Ronettes] 1940's swing, glam rock, disco, 80's up to current day.

Having performed as a trio with backing tracks for many years, the group now has a 6-piece band for festivals, specialising in soul and Motown.

Group members have included Carolyn McLaughlin (also known as Carolyn Lambourn), Bea Lee-Smith, Erika Takacs, Emily Mowbray, Kali Gazley, Mel Golding, Natalie McCormack, Christina Cusiel Kali Kopae, and Nahrelle Ahrens. McLaughlin is a sound-effects technician working in both film and television. Ahrens also works in film and theatre, and as a voice-over artist.

While working in Sydney for an extended period of time at the turn of the 21st century, Sanders and Watkins established a "second-tier BeatGirls trio" based there but managed by Sanders and Watkins from New Zealand once they returned. This included personnel such as Jackeline Laso, Nathalie Cotte, Caitlin ?, Ainslie Allen (who originally started with the act in NZ). Sanders "trained in Russian classical ballet" before studying contemporary dance with Deirdre Tarrant; her first professional employment as a dancer was with Michael Parmenter. She is also a marriage celebrant, which adds to the sort of gigs the Beatgirls can promote themselves for.

Watkins was nominated by Ernst and Young for entrepreneur of the year in 2005 as a consequence of his decision to create several versions of the group to take full advantage of the multitude of gigs and events on offer.

In 2019 both Sanders and McLaughlin were part of Cringe Worthy, a "musical tribute to 1970s New Zealand" that had two short seasons at Circa Theatre in Wellington, a month-long season at Centrepoint Theatre in Palmerston North, and was part of various arts festivals around the country. Sanders admitted that, after years of performing as part of the Beatgirls, "it's really satisfying to be able to do something completely related to New Zealand and its culture." As well as performing, Sanders was director and deviser. She has since written and performed in Cringeworthy the 80's, Cringeworthy - swinging in the 60's and has started to devise Cringeworthy - trippin' in the 90's.
