= Plimmerton =

Suburb of Porirua, New Zealand

- Suburb
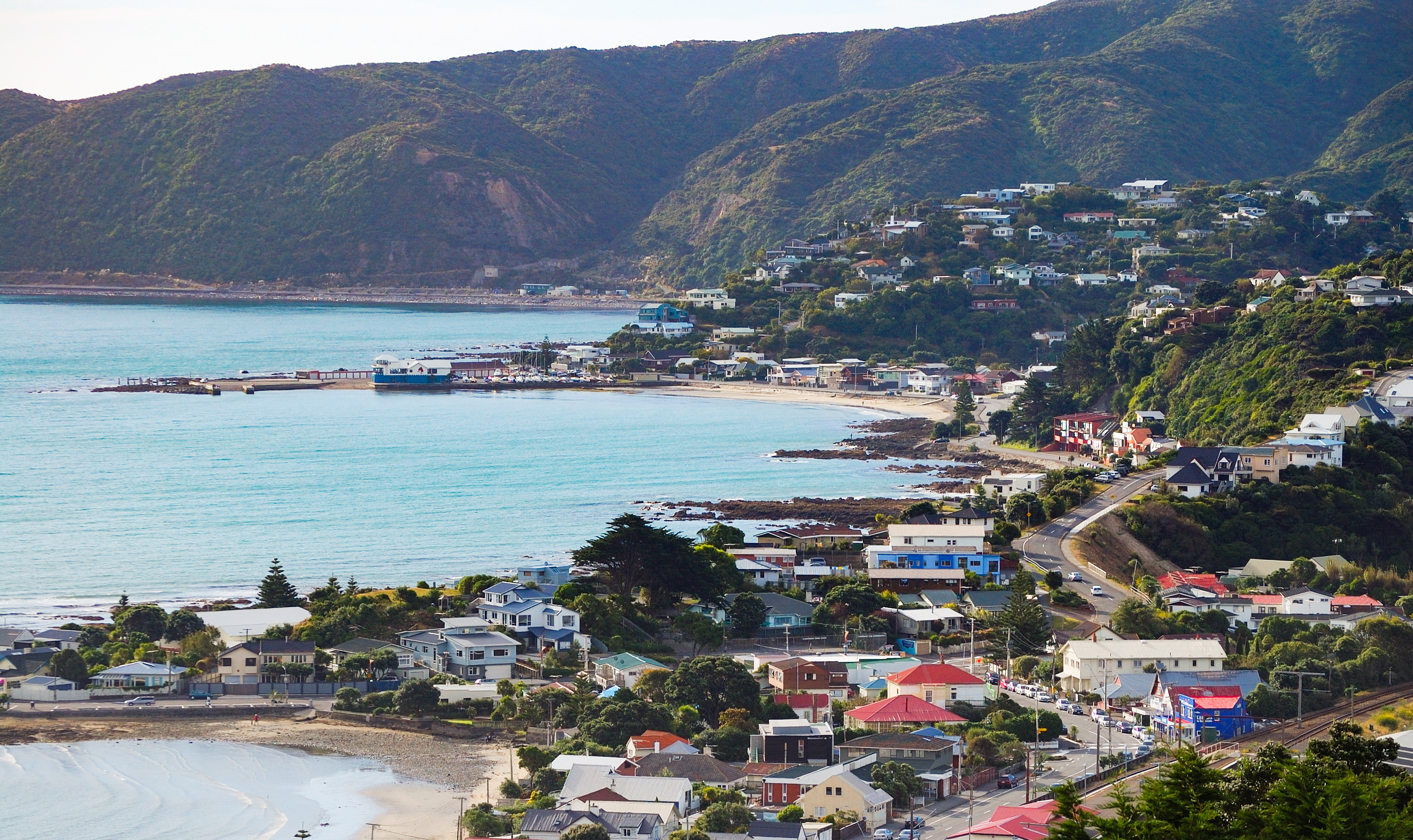
- Interactive map of Plimmerton
- Coordinates: 41°05′S 174°52′E
- Country: New Zealand
- City: Porirua
- Local authority: Porirua City Council
- Electoral ward: Pāuatahanui General Ward; Porirua Māori Ward

Area
  - Land: 516 ha (1,280 acres)

Population (June 2025)
  - Total: 2,130
  - Density: 413/km^{2} (1,070/sq mi)
- Train stations: Plimmerton railway station

Hongoeka	Pukerua Bay
Porirua Harbour, then Cook Strait	Plimmerton	Paekākāriki Hill
	Mana and part of Porirua Harbour	Camborne

Plimmerton is a seaside suburb that lies in the northwest part of the city of Porirua in New Zealand, adjacent to some of the city's more congenial beaches. State Highway 59 and the North Island Main Trunk railway line pass just east of the main shopping and residential area.

Plimmerton has its modern origins as a late 19th century seaside resort. It is named after John Plimmer, an English settler and entrepreneur who, through the Wellington and Manawatu Railway Company, helped to fund and direct construction of the railway line. The estimated population is 2,130 as of June 2025.

== History ==
The area was first settled by the Māori people early in their occupation of New Zealand. Ngāi Tara and then Ngāti Ira settled south of Kāpiti, and a number of other tribes may have lived in the area including Muaūpoko, Ngāti Apa, Ngāti Kahungunu and Ngāti Hotu.

Ngāti Toa people took control of the Porirua coast in the 1820s. In the 1840s the area where Plimmerton is situated was the home of Te Rauparaha, who had his main residence at Taupō pā. Te Rauparaha was captured by 200 British troops and police on 23 July 1846 near the southern end of Motuhara Road. A tiny historic reserve contains a cabbage tree that may be descended from the one he was said to have been captured near, and a plaque. In 1847, most of Ngāti Toa’s land in Porirua was sold to the Crown for the New Zealand Company by a group of eight chiefs, and Taupō was retained as part of a Māori reserve (one of three) that extended from Paremata to Paekākāriki. However, the following year Te Rauparaha was released and retired to Ōtaki; by 1850 Taupō pā was deserted.

Taupō village, George French Angas, 1822–1886

The area continued to be referred to as Taupō, after the pā, and was leased by Ngāti Toa for farming by European settlers over the following decades. These included William Cooper, Canington (possible Carrington), and then Levi Tandy (from 1859). James Walker farmed from Paremata to Plimmerton beginning in 1875.

In the late 19th Century Ngāti Toa’s land holdings around Taupō began to rapidly decline as land was by converted to individual title by the Native Land Court and then sold, transferred to the Public Trustee or taken for public works and reserves.

When the Horokiwi Valley Road was opened fewer travellers followed the Taua Tapu track through Taupō to Pukerua Bay. So Pāuatahanui grew at the expense of Taupō until the railway line was opened in 1885.

In the 1880s the Wellington and Manawatu Railway Company decided to build a railway link from the capital, Wellington, to Longburn, near Palmerston North. Several towns, including Plimmerton, were established along the way to encourage settlements that would contribute to the line's business. John Plimmer, after whom Plimmerton was named, was a director of the company.

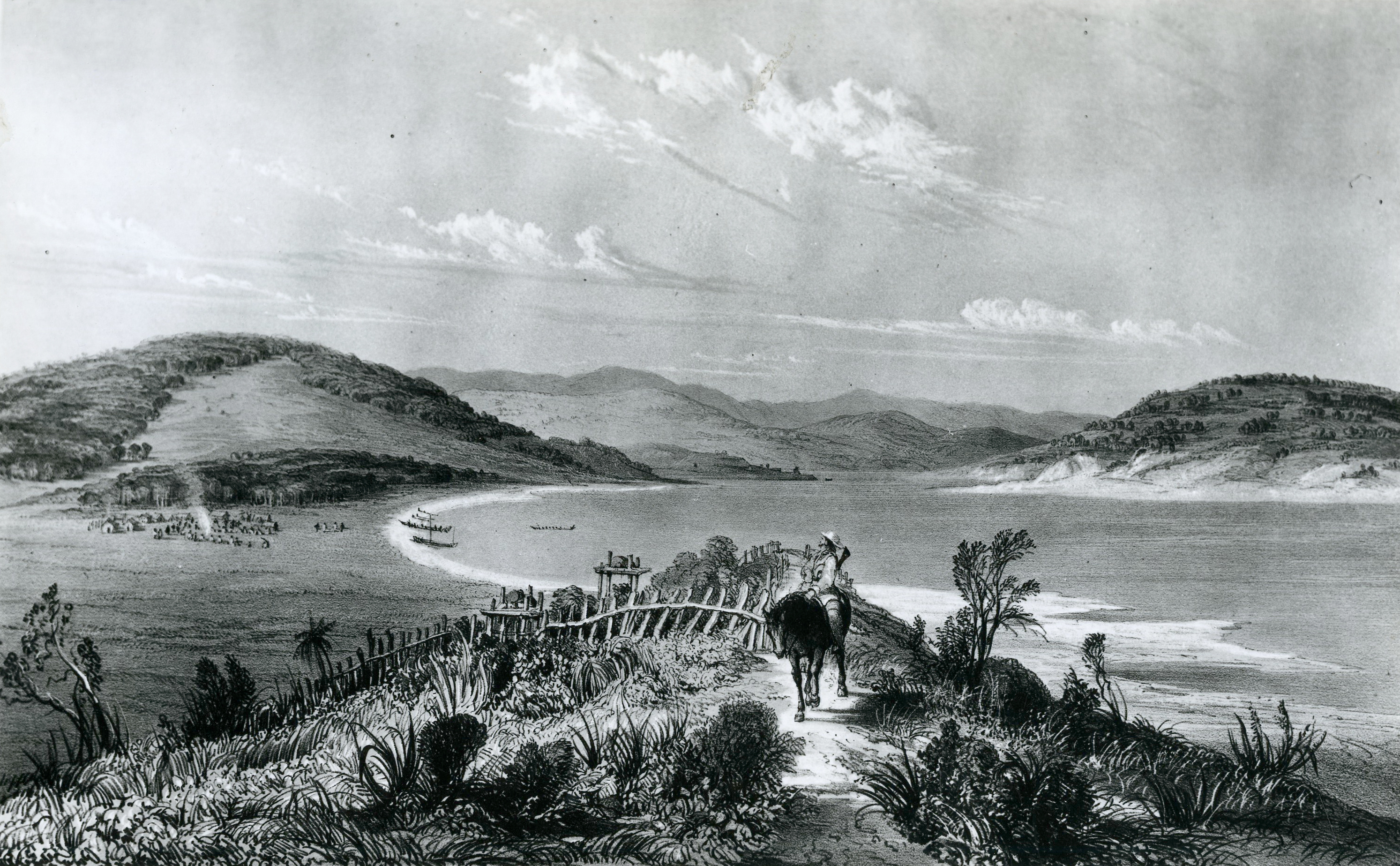
View of Taupō Kainga from the Taua Tapu (Pukerua) Track, Plimmerton

In 1885 the first excursion train journeyed from Wellington to Plimmerton on 3 September, and regular services began from 10 October. With the railway's arrival, Plimmerton became accessible to holidaymakers, and evolved into a seaside resort. Plimmerton House, a two-storied hotel, was built alongside the in 1886 (and burnt down in 1907). Sections began to be sold in 1888 and by the late 1890s Plimmerton had become a popular holiday destination. In 1900 Plimmerton consisted of 30 summer cottages, two private hotels and one general store.

Plimmerton was originally part of Hutt County. On 1 April 1973 the still-growing area became one of the northern suburbs of Porirua. Though small, it was one of the most lively. For a time it had the only active Residents' Association in the city.

The main state highway route through Plimmerton, previously part of SH 1, was renumbered SH 59 on 7 December 2021 due to SH 1 being shifted to the Transmission Gully Motorway.

== Official name ==
The name Plimmerton was used in promoting the railway and advertising of sections for sale from the mid-1880s.

Plimmerton was gazetted as an official geographic name on 3 November 2011. The suburb amalgamated the previous recorded suburb names of Plimmerton and Karehana Bay. It excludes the largely Māori (Ngāti Toa) settlement of Hongoeka to the west, which was gazetted on 16 December 2010.

== Demographics and census information ==
The Plimmerton statistical area covers 5.16 km^{2} (1.99 sq mi), and includes Hongoeka and Karehana Bay. It had an estimated population of 2,130 as of June 2025, with a population density of 412.79 people per km^{2}.

Historical population
Year	Pop.	±% p.a.
2006	2,052	—
2013	2,115	+0.43%
2018	2,142	+0.25%
2023	2,106	−0.34%

Plimmerton had a population of 2,106 in the 2023 New Zealand census, a decrease of 36 people (−1.7%) since the 2018 census, and a decrease of 9 people (−0.4%) since the 2013 census. There were 1,032 males, 1,059 females, and 15 people of other genders in 858 dwellings. 3.7% of people identified as LGBTIQ+. The median age was 46.7 years (compared with 38.1 years nationally). There were 354 people (16.8%) aged under 15 years, 300 (14.2%) aged 15 to 29, 1,023 (48.6%) aged 30 to 64, and 432 (20.5%) aged 65 or older.

People could identify as more than one ethnicity. The results were 87.6% European (Pākehā); 16.4% Māori; 5.1% Pasifika; 3.7% Asian; 1.0% Middle Eastern, Latin American and African New Zealanders (MELAA); and 1.9% other, which includes people giving their ethnicity as "New Zealander". English was spoken by 98.1%, Māori by 4.8%, Samoan by 0.3%, and other languages by 10.1%. No language could be spoken by 1.6% (e.g. too young to talk). New Zealand Sign Language was known by 0.4%. The percentage of people born overseas was 24.6, compared with 28.8% nationally.

Religious affiliations were 28.8% Christian, 0.9% Hindu, 0.3% Islam, 0.4% Māori religious beliefs, 0.3% Buddhist, 0.4% New Age, 0.4% Jewish, and 1.4% other religions. People who answered that they had no religion were 60.7%, and 6.6% of people did not answer the census question.

Of those at least 15 years old, 708 (40.4%) people had a bachelor's or higher degree, 819 (46.7%) had a post-high school certificate or diploma, and 228 (13.0%) people exclusively held high school qualifications. The median income was $61,100, compared with $41,500 nationally. 471 people (26.9%) earned over $100,000 compared to 12.1% nationally. The employment status of those at least 15 was 993 (56.7%) full-time, 246 (14.0%) part-time, and 45 (2.6%) unemployed.

== Localities ==
State Highway 59, here named St Andrews Road, passes through Plimmerton, as does the North Island Main Trunk railway line

A shopping area about two blocks long adjoins Plimmerton railway station on Steyne Avenue and includes a church, a medical centre, Plunket rooms, a craft shop, a beauty salon, real estate agents, a grocery store and several eateries.

To the north alongside the railway line is Plimmerton Domain, comprising 3 football fields, home to the Mana Archery Club, Wellington 29th Boys' Brigade and the Mana Arts Society. Beyond is the Plimmerton Industrial Estate, which includes numerous businesses, the Plimmerton Croquet Club, and a storage facility for the New Zealand Film Archive.

The Mainline Steam railway preservation group have their extensive restoration facilities located behind Plimmerton railway station.

North of the industrial area is the Taupō Swamp, a flax swamp, one of the largest of its type in the southern half of the North Island. Taupō Stream passes south through the swamp, along the east edge of Plimmerton Domain, between Steyne Avenue and St Andrews Road, and then flows into the sea at the north end of South Beach.

Plimmerton Library, which was part of Porirua City Council's library system, closed on 27 July 2012. It opened in the late 1940s and operated from a single-room building near the school from November 1951 until December 2007. It then shifted to the Plimmerton Pavilion, opposite the Plimmerton Volunteer Fire Brigade building, until its closure.

South-west of the shopping area is Plimmerton Beach, a fairly sheltered, gently graded beach, which has been a popular recreation area for over a century. It is popular with windsurfers; some world champions have trained there. At the southern end is South Beach. Recreational water quality at Plimmerton Beach is rated "fair" by the Greater Wellington Regional Council; water quality at South Beach is rated "poor", however, due to periodic faecal contamination. This contamination may originate from Taupō Swamp (via Taupō Stream), which often supports a large waterfowl population.

Another popular beach is Karehana Bay, at the foot of the Airlie Road/Cluny Road valley about 1.5 kilometres north-west of the shops. Poet Denis Glover mentioned the settlement in his poem Threnody: "In Plimmerton, in Plimmerton, the little penguins play, and one dead albatross was found at Karehana Bay".

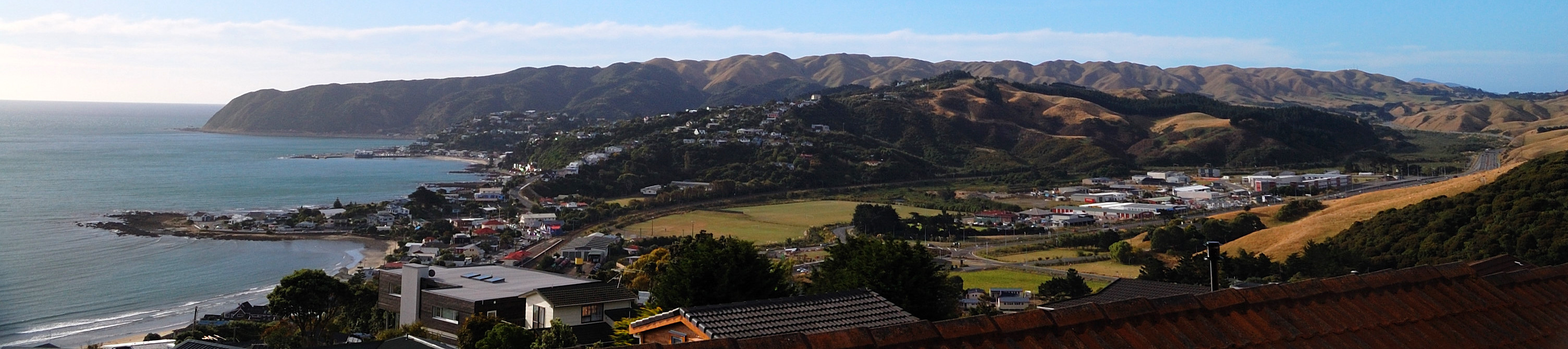
Panorama of Plimmerton from Camborne

== Education ==
Plimmerton School is a state primary school for Year 1 to 8 students, with a roll of 374 as of March 2026. It opened in 1904.

St Theresa's School is a state-integrated Catholic primary school for Year 1 to 6 students, with a roll of 190. It opened in 1949.

Both schools are co-educational. Rolls are as of March 2026.

Plimmerton also has a kindergarten.

== Notable people ==
- Andrea Sanders, founder of musical group The Beatgirls
