= Ngāti Toa =

Māori iwi (tribe) in New Zealand

- Iwi (tribe) in Māoridom
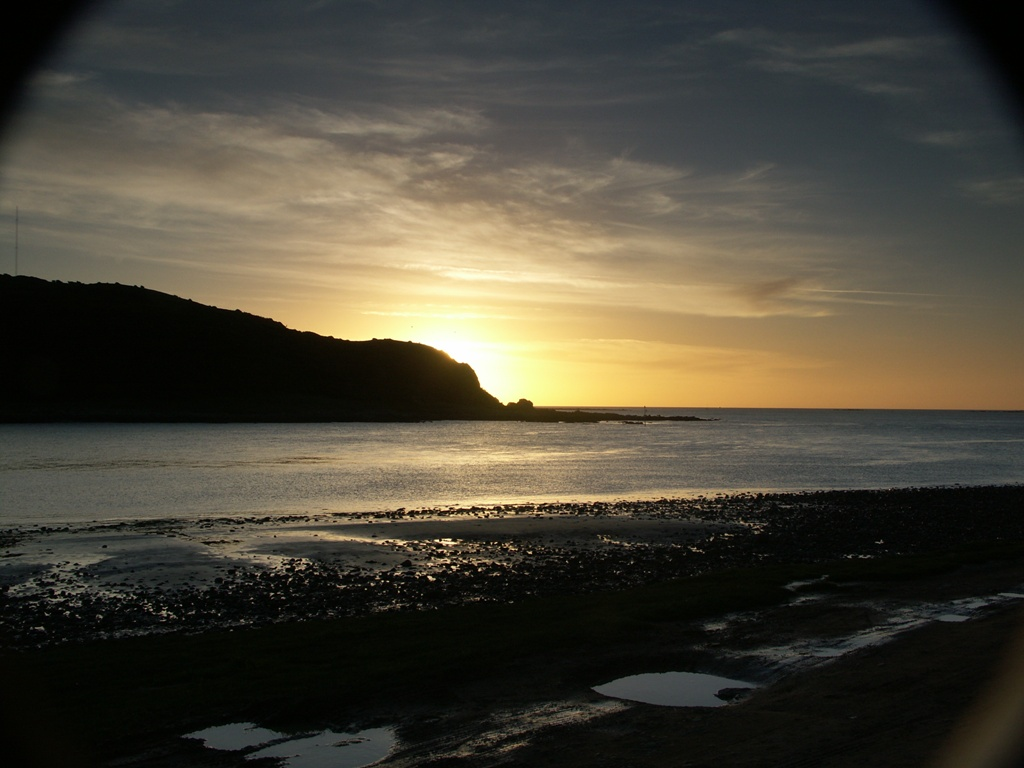
- Ngāti Toa Domain, Porirua

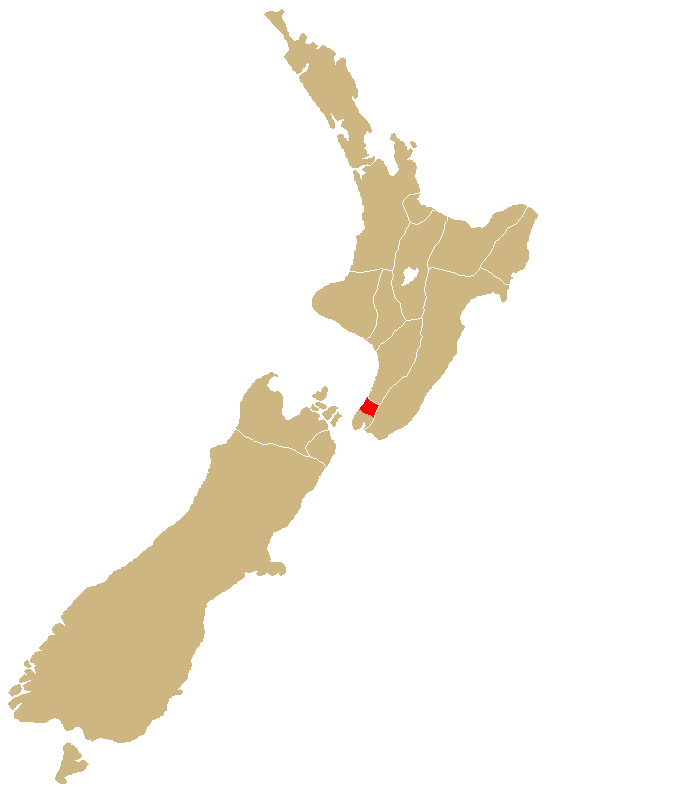
- Rohe (region): Lower North Island; Upper South Island
- Waka (canoe): Tainui
- Population: 7,038 (c. 2023)
- Website: www.ngatitoa.iwi.nz

Ngāti Toa, also called Ngāti Toarangatira or Ngāti Toa Rangatira, is a Māori iwi (tribe) based in the southern North Island and the northern South Island of New Zealand. Ngāti Toa remains a small iwi with a population of about 9,000. The iwi is centred around Porirua, Plimmerton, Kāpiti, Blenheim and Arapaoa Island. It has four marae: Takapūwāhia and Hongoeka in Porirua City, and Whakatū and Wairau in the South Island. Ngāti Toa's governing body has the name Te Rūnanga o Toa Rangatira.

The iwi traces its descent from the eponymous ancestor Toarangatira. Ngāti Toa lived in the Kāwhia region of the North Island until the 1820s, when forced out by conflict with other Tainui iwi, led by Pōtatau Te Wherowhero (c. 1785 – 1860), who later became the first Māori King (r. 1858–1860). Ngāti Toa, Ngāti Rārua and Ngāti Koata, led by Te Rauparaha (c. 1765 – 1849), escaped south and invaded Taranaki and the Wellington regions together with three north Taranaki iwi, Te Āti Awa, Ngāti Tama and Ngāti Mutunga. Together they fought and conquered the people of Wellington, Ngāti Ira, who practically ceased to exist as an independent iwi. After the 1820s, the region conquered by Ngāti Toa extended from Miria-te-kakara at Rangitikei to Wellington, and across Cook Strait to Wairau and Nelson.

== History ==
=== Origins of the iwi ===
The ancestors of the Ngāti Toa people came to New Zealand on the Tainui canoe. The tribe lived in the Kāwhia region, a western coastal part of the present-day Waikato Region, for many generations until the early 19th century.

Tū-pāhau, a descendant of Hoturoa, the captain of the Tainui, received warning of an imminent attack by Tāmure, a priest of Tainui, and at once organised a plan of defence and attack. Tū-pāhau had only 300 warriors against Tāmure's army of 2,000, but Tū-pāhau and his followers won the battle. Tū-pāhau spared Tāmure's life, to which Tāmure responded, "Tēnā koe Tū-pāhau, te toa rangatira!", meaning "Hail Tū-pāhau the chivalrous warrior!" (toa meaning "brave man" or "champion" and rangatira meaning "gallant", "grand", "admirable" or "chiefly"). From then on, Tū-pāhau's tribe was known as Ngāti Toarangatira.

Later, Tū-pāhau's son and daughter-in-law had a child who received the name "Toarangatira" to commemorate both this event and the subsequent peace made between Tāmure and Tū-pāhau. Due to his capabilities in leadership and warfare, Toarangatira took the senior leadership role, despite having an older brother. Ngāti Toa trace their descent from Toarangatira.

=== Migrations ===
From the late 18th century Ngāti Toa and related tribes constantly warred with the Waikato–Maniapoto tribes for control of the rich fertile land north of Kāwhia. The wars intensified with every killing of a major chief and with each insult and slight suffered, peaking with the huge battle of Hingakaka in the late 18th or early 19th century, in which Ngāti Toa and their allies were routed. The conflicts forced Ngāti Toa to migrate away from their Kāwhia homeland, first to Taranaki, then to the Cook Strait region, under the leadership of their chief Te Rauparaha in the 1820s. Together, the two migrations Heke Tahutahuahi and Heke Tātaramoa have the name Heke mai raro, meaning "migration from the north". The carved meeting-house bearing the name Te Heke Mai Raro, which stands on Hongoeka Marae, immortalises the migration.

Heke Tahutahuahi (translatable as the "fire lighting expedition") brought Ngāti Toa out of Kāwhia and into Taranaki in 1820. The Taranaki iwi Ngāti Mutunga presented Ngāti Toa with Pukewhakamaru Pā, as well as with the cultivations nearby. Pukewhakamaru lay inland of Ōkokī, up the Urenui River. Ngāti Toa stayed at Pukewhakamaru for 12 months. The Waikato–Maniapoto alliance followed Ngāti Toa to Taranaki and battles ensued there, most notably the battle of Motunui between Waikato–Maniapoto and the Ngāti Tama, Te Āti Awa and Ngāti Mutunga alliance.

The name Heke Tātaramoa (translatable as the "bramble bush migration") commemorates the difficulties experienced during Ngāti Toa's second migration. They left Ōkokī around February–March 1822 after harvesting crops planted for the journey. This heke also included some people from Ngāti Tama, Ngāti Mutunga and Te Āti Awa. The heke arrived in the Horowhenua–Kāpiti region in the early 1820s and settled first in Te Awamate, near the mouth of the Rangitīkei River, then at Te Wharangi (now Foxton Beach), at the mouth of the Manawatū River, and then eventually on Kapiti Island.

=== Te Rauparaha ===
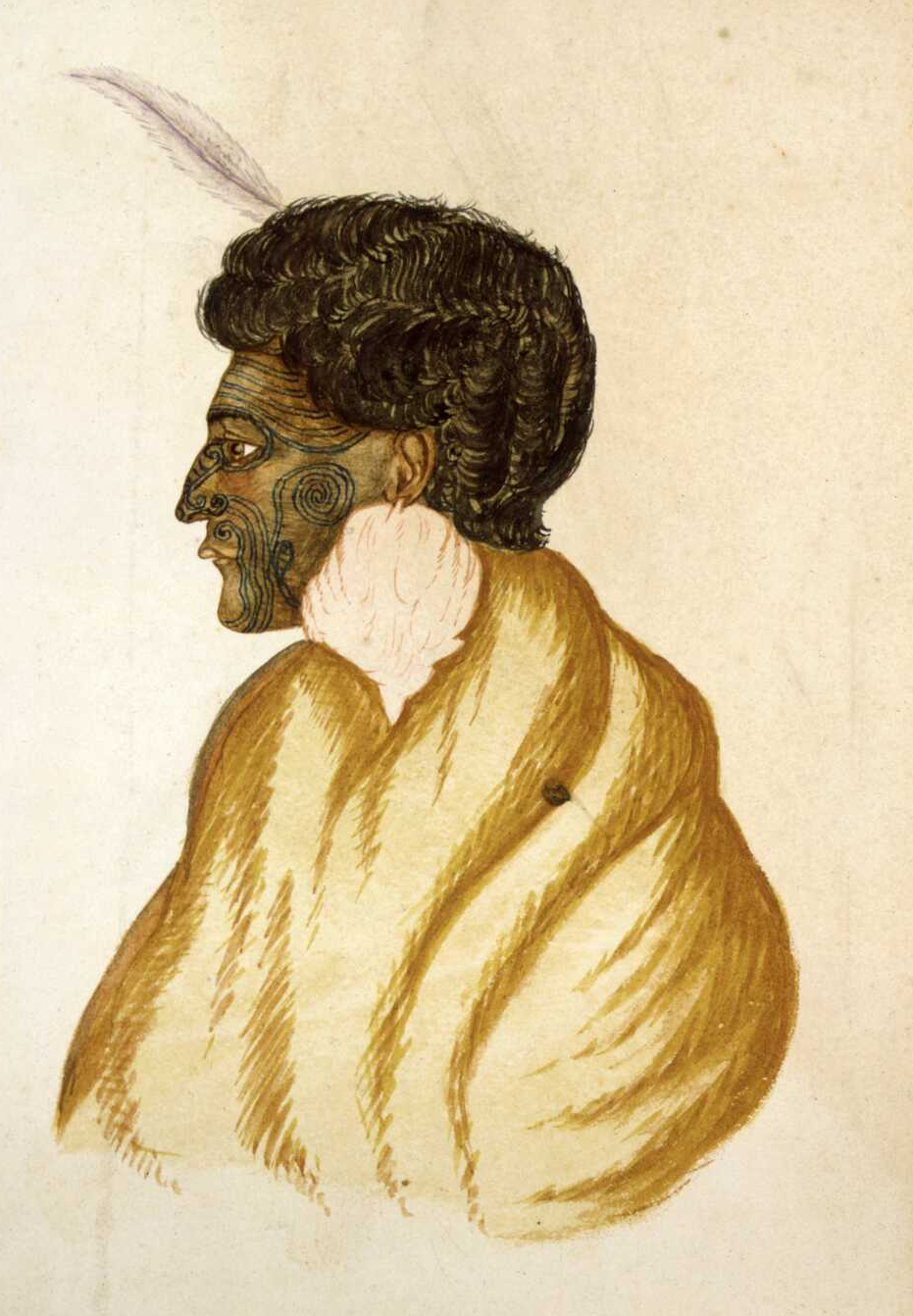
Sketch of Te Rauparaha

Parekōwhatu of Ngāti Raukawa, the wife of Werawera of Ngāti Toa, gave birth to Te Rauparaha in about the 1760s. According to tribal tradition the birth took place near Kāwhia. Te Rauparaha became the foremost chief of Ngāti Toa, credited with leading Ngāti Toa forces against the Waikato and Ngāti Maniapoto iwi and then, after his defeat, with piloting the migration to, and the conquest and settlement of, the Cook Strait region in the 1820s. Later he crossed Cook Strait to attack the Rangitane people in the Wairau valley. His attempt to conquer the southern South Island iwi was thwarted by an outbreak of measles which killed many of his warriors.

Te Rauparaha signed the Treaty of Waitangi twice in 1840: first at Kapiti Island and then again at Wairau. Te Rauparaha resisted European settlement in areas that he claimed he had not sold. Later disputes occurred over Porirua and the Hutt Valley. But the major clash came in 1843 when Te Rauparaha and his nephew Te Rangihaeata tried to prevent the survey of lands in the Wairau plains. These lands had been claimed by the New Zealand Company "on two grounds – alleged purchase by Captain Blenkinsop, master of a Sydney whaler in 1831–32; and the negotiations between their principal agent (Colonel Wakefield) and Rauparaha, the head of this tribe, in 1839". Te Rauparaha burnt down a whare that housed survey equipment. The Nelson magistrate ordered his arrest and deputised a number of citizens as police. Te Rauparaha resisted arrest and fighting broke out, resulting in the death of Te Rongo, the wife of Te Rangihaeata. Te Rangihaeata then killed the survey-party, who had surrendered, to avenge his wife's death in an act of utu. This became known as the Wairau Affray or until modern times, the Wairau massacre, as most of the Europeans were killed after the fighting had stopped.

Following fighting in the Hutt Valley in 1846, Governor George Grey arrested Te Rauparaha after British troops discovered he was receiving and sending secret instructions to the local Māori who were attacking settlers. In a surprise attack on his pa, Te Rauparaha, who was now quite elderly, was captured and taken prisoner of war. The government held him as a prisoner for 10 months and then kept him under house arrest in Auckland on board a prison ship, the Driver. After his capture fighting stopped in the Wellington region. Te Rauparaha was released to attend a Māori peace conference at Kohimaramara in Auckland and then given his liberty after giving up any claim to the Wairau valley. Te Rauparaha's last notable achievement came with the construction of Rangiātea Church (1846) in Ōtaki. He did not adopt Christianity, although he attended church services.

Te Rauparaha died on 27 November 1849. Many remember him as the author of the haka "Ka Mate", which he composed after being hidden in a pit after a defeat in battle.

=== Land settlements ===
In mid-October 2025, Ngāti Toa Rangatira reached a settlement with public radio broadcaster Radio New Zealand (RNZ) to purchase 53 hectares of land in Whitireia for NZ$5 million following an earlier acquisition in Titahi Bay. In 1848, the tribe had gifted about 202 hectares to the Anglican Church of New Zealand in exchange for the promise of a school being built on the land for the tribe's children. The school was never built and the land was vested in the Porirua College Trust Board during the early 20th century. In 1935, the New Zealand Broadcasting Service acquired 40 hectares for Radio 2YA, the predecessor to RNZ. Following years of litigation, RNZ agreed to sell the land back to Ngāti Toa Rangatira for NZ$5 million. As part of the settlement, the tribe would lease 12 hectares of the land back to RNZ for its AM broadcasting transmissions.

== Tribal sayings ==
A saying delineates the tribe's historical boundaries in central New Zealand:

Mai i Miria-te-kakara ki Whitireia,
Whakawhiti te moana Raukawa ki Wairau, ki Whakatū,
Te Waka Tainui.

The tribe lives mainly around Porirua and Nelson. An aphorism links tribal identity with ancestors and landmarks:

Ko Whitireia te maunga
Ko Raukawa te moana
Ko Tainui te waka
Ko Ngāti Toarangatira te iwi
Ko Te Rauparaha te tangata

Whitireia is the mountain
Raukawa (Cook Strait) is the sea
Tainui is the waka
Ngāti Toarangatira is the tribe
Te Rauparaha is the man

== "Ka Mate" haka ==
Concern over inappropriate commercial use of Te Rauparaha's "Ka Mate" led the iwi to attempt to trademark it, but in 2006 the Intellectual Property Office of New Zealand turned their claim down on the grounds that "Ka Mate" had achieved wide recognition in New Zealand and abroad as representing New Zealand as a whole and not a particular trader.

In 2009, as a part of a wider settlement of grievances, the New Zealand government agreed to:

... record the authorship and significance of the haka Ka Mate to Ngāti Toa and ... work with Ngāti Toa to address their concerns with the haka... [but] does not expect that redress will result in royalties for the use of Ka Mate or provide Ngāti Toa with a veto on the performance of Ka Mate ....

In November 2021, tribal elders told anti-Covid-vaccine protesters in New Zealand to stop using the "Ka Mate" haka at their rallies.

== Marae and wharenui ==
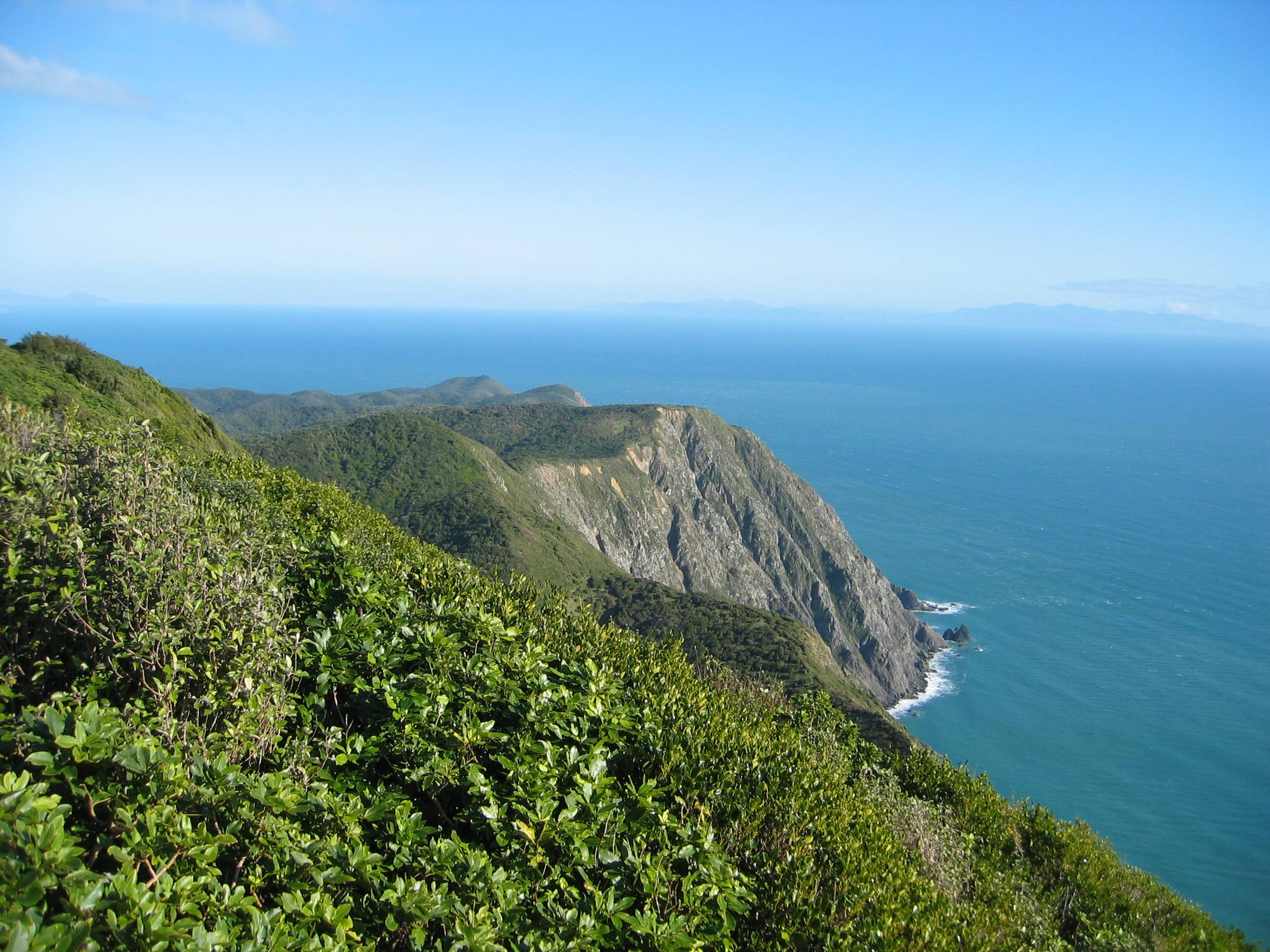
Looking south towards Cook Strait and the South Island from Kapiti Island

There are four marae (communal places) and wharenui (meeting houses) affiliated with Ngāti Toa:

- Hongoeka Marae (including Te Heke Mai Raro wharenui), Plimmerton
- Takapuwahia Marae (including Toa Rangatira wharenui), Porirua
- Wairau Marae (including Wairau wharenui), Spring Creek
- Whakatū Marae (including Kākāti wharenui), Nelson

== Governance ==
Te Runanga o Toa Rangatira Inc is recognised by the New Zealand Government as the governance entity of Ngāti Toa following its Treaty of Waitangi settlement with the Crown under Ngāti Toa Rangatira Claims Settlement Act 2014. It is a mandated iwi organisation under the Māori Fisheries Act 2004, an iwi aquaculture organisation under the Māori Commercial Aquaculture Claims Settlement Act 2004, an "iwi authority" under the Resource Management Act, and a Tūhono organisation.

Te Runanga o Toa Rangatira is an incorporated society, governed by a board of 15 representatives, including three elected from iwi whānui, some appointed from Hamilton, Nelson and Wairau, and some appointed from marae and other Ngāti Toa organisations. As of 2026, the tumuaki (chairperson) of the iwi is Callum Kātene and the tumu whakarae (chief executive) is Helmut Modlik.

Wellington pan-tribal Māori radio station Te Upoko O Te Ika has been affiliated to Ngāti Toa since 2014. It began part-time broadcasting in 1983 and full-time broadcasting in 1987, and it is New Zealand's longest-running Māori radio station. Atiawa Toa FM is an official radio station of Ngāti Toa and Te Atiawa. It began as Atiawa FM in 1993, broadcasting to Te Atiawa in the Hutt Valley and Wellington. It changed its name in Atiawa Toa FM in mid-1997, expanding its reach to Ngāti Toa in Porirua and Kāpiti Coast.

Ngāti Toa have interests in the territories of Greater Wellington Regional Council, Tasman District Council, Nelson City Council and Marlborough District Council. They also have interests in the territories of Kāpiti Coast District Council, Porirua City Council and Wellington City Council.

7,038 people in New Zealand listed an affiliation with Ngāti Toa in the 2023 Census. The 2025/26 Ngāti Toa annual report listed 9,952 registered iwi members worldwide.

== Notable people ==
- Wiremu Parata (c.1830s–1906), politician
- Te Rauparaha (c.1768–1849), rangatira and chief
- Te Rangihaeata (c.1780s–1855), chief
- Kahe Te Rau-o-te-rangi (died c. 1871), leader, trader and innkeeper
- Vernice Wineera (1938-2024), poet, editor and educator
