= Porirua Harbour =

Harbour in New Zealand

- Te Awarua-o-Porirua Harbour
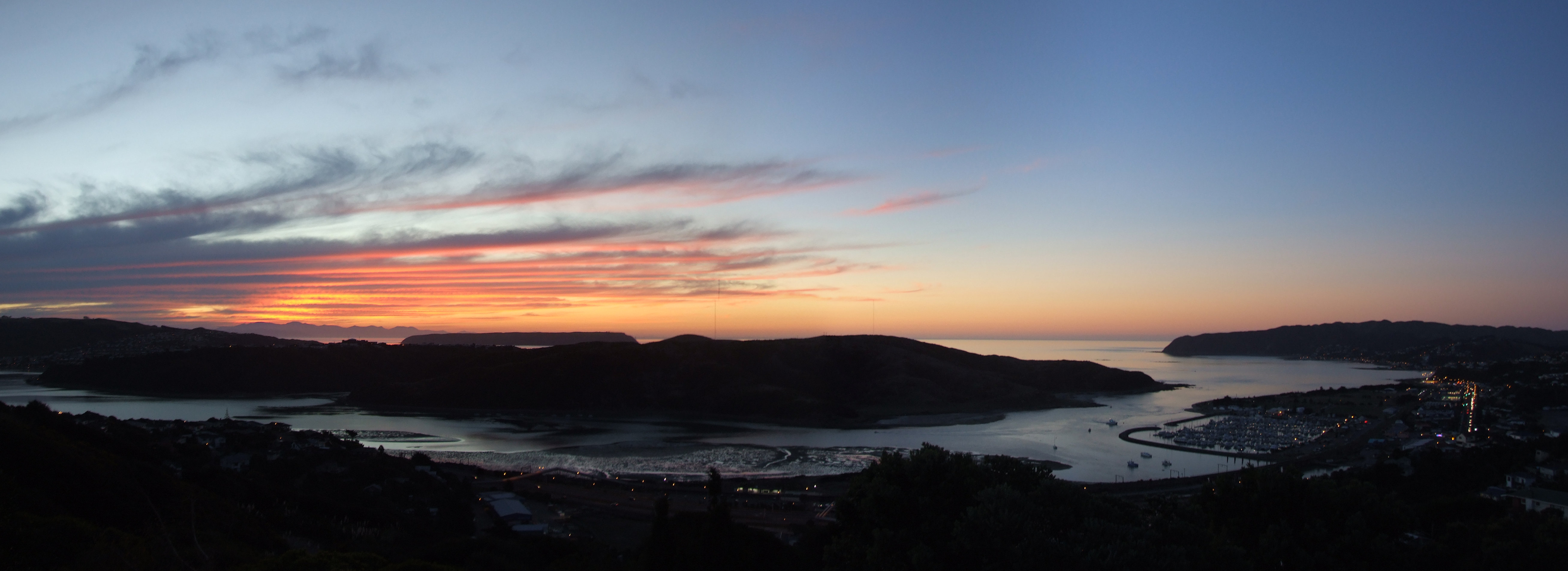
- Sunset over Porirua Inlet and Harbour entrance

- Location on the North Island
- Location: Porirua, Wellington, New Zealand
- Coordinates: 41°05′S 174°51′E
- Type: Harbour
- River sources: Porirua Stream, Pāuatahanui Stream
- Ocean/sea sources: Tasman Sea

Porirua Harbour, officially Te Awarua-o-Porirua Harbour, is a natural inlet in the south-western coast of the North Island of New Zealand.

The harbour is within the main urban area of the Wellington Region, and is surrounded by the city of Porirua, with the city centre to the south of the harbour.

== Geography ==
The harbour has an entrance only a few hundred metres in width, close to the suburb of Plimmerton. It opens up into two arms, Onepoto Arm to the south and Pāuatahanui Arm to the north-east. Each arm is around three kilometres in length.

The Pāuatahanui Inlet arm extends eastward to the settlement of Pāuatahanui. The wetland there where the Pāuatahanui Stream enters the Pāuatahanui Inlet, is the largest remaining estuarine wetland in the lower North Island, and the Pāuatahanui Wildlife Reserve was established in the 1980s to protect the inlet's environment and to restore damaged areas.

== History ==
The Porirua Harbour formed when westward flowing rivers were drowned by rising postglacial sea levels approximately 10000–14000 years ago. There is a tradition that the 1855 Wairarapa Earthquake caused tectonic uplift in the Pāuatahanui Arm of the inlet, changing the shoreline and reducing its navigability. However, according to George Eiby, the inlet always had limited accessibility, and the earthquake didn't significantly change the shoreline, with any changes likely coming from more recent sedimentation.

Part of the Porirua Inlet was reclaimed for a causeway carrying the North Island Main Trunk railway when the section between Porirua and Mana was straightened and double tracked. The new section of the Kāpiti Line was opened on 7 November 1960. A new Paremata Railway Station and bridge over the entrance to the Pāuatahanui Inlet were required.

The line no longer followed the curves of the shoreline bays north of Porirua, and three shallow lagoons on the land side of the new causeway were created. When State Highway 1 was re-aligned and straightened in the 1970s to run alongside the rail line, these lagoons were partially filled in. Aotea Lagoon was developed into a recreational area, albeit very polluted.

The name of the harbour was officially altered to Te Awarua-o-Porirua Harbour in August 2014.

== Recreation ==
The Pāuatahanui Inlet is used for windsurfing, but is not recommended for swimming.

North of Paremata are the swimming beaches of Plimmerton and Karehana Bay. The southern end of Plimmerton Beach is also exposed to northwesterly winds for windsurfing.

There are also fishing spots at Tokaapapa Reef (or Grandfather rocks) off Plimmerton, Mana Island and Hunters Bank. However, weather conditions can change quickly and can be hazardous.

== Guardians of Pāuatahanui Inlet ==
A community group, the Guardians of Pāuatahanui Inlet, was set up in 1991 as a registered charity, to undertake tasks such as cleaning up around the inlet. They also run photographic competitions.

In 2026, the Guardians reported the results of triennial surveys of cockle populations in the Pāuatahanui Inlet. The total population of cockles in the inlet was estimated at 519 million, more than twice the number estimated in the first of the surveys conducted in 1992. The average density of cockles was higher than in any previous survey, at 51.9 per 0.1 square metres, and the proportion of juvenile cockles had increased significantly since 1992.

== Gallery ==
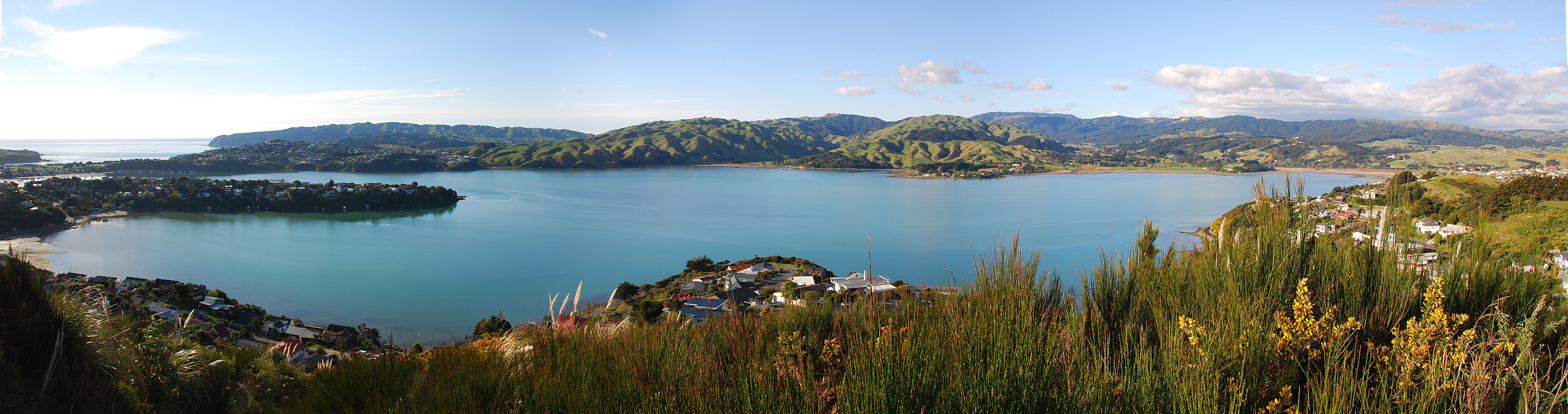
The Pāuatahanui arm of the Porirua Harbour with the entrance at the extreme left and Pāuatahanui at the extreme right

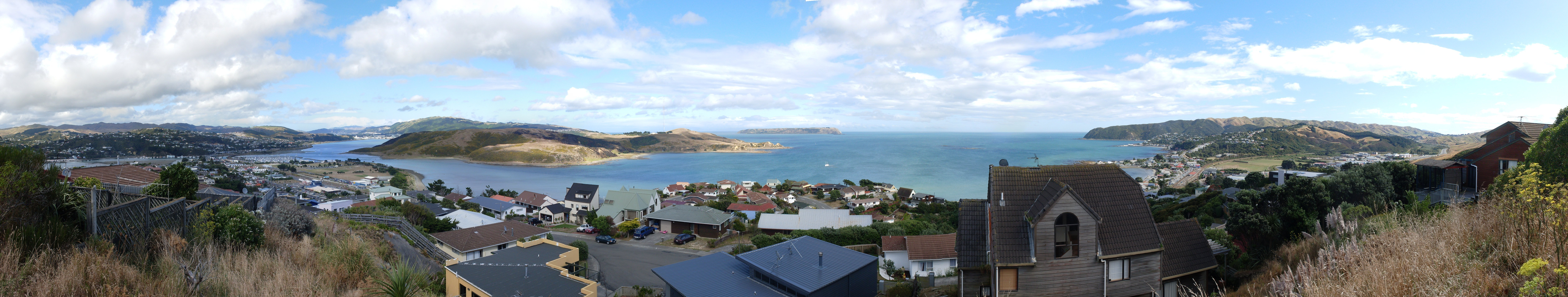
Porirua Harbour viewed from Camborne. Mana Island is in the centre; Plimmerton to the right. Pāuatahanui inlet to the left.

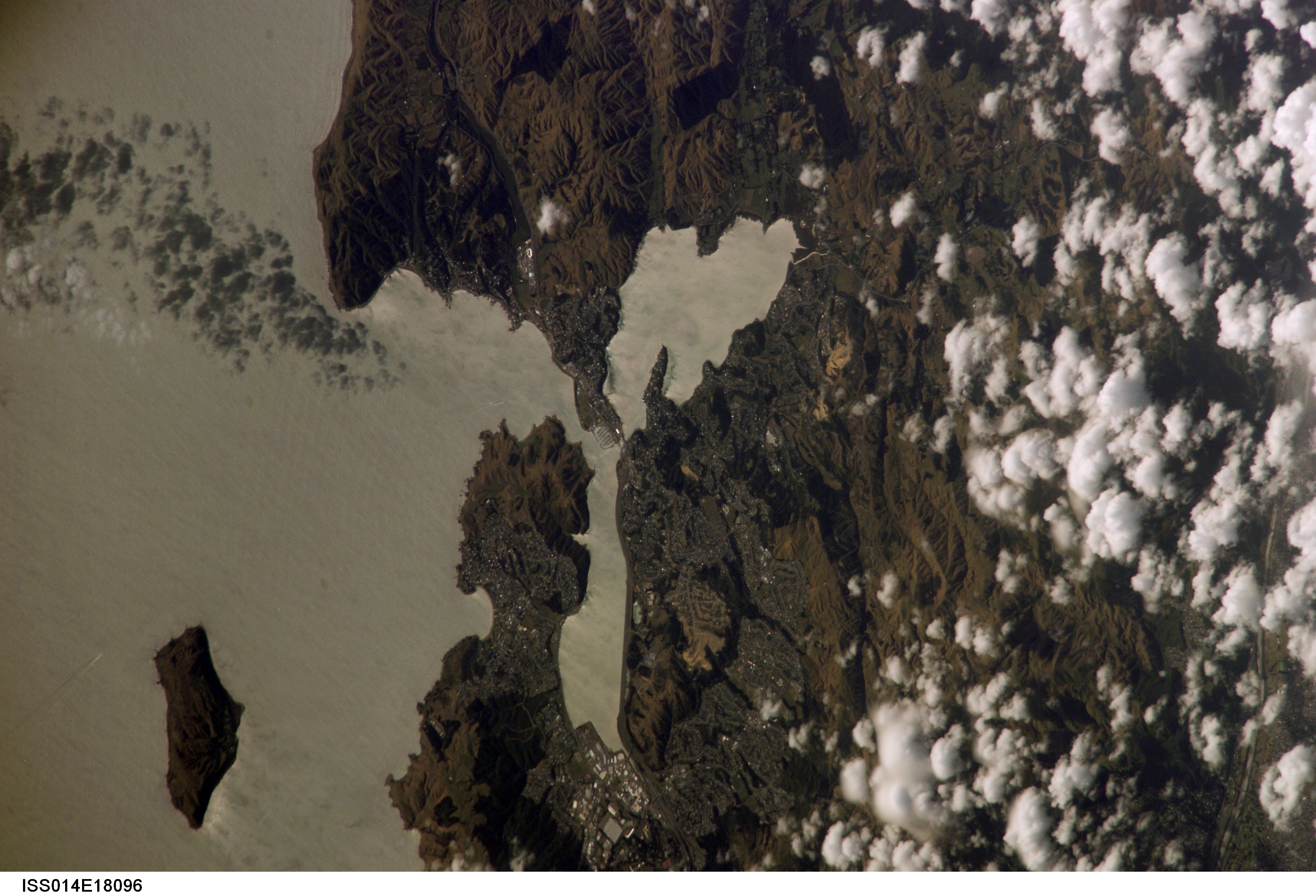
Porirua Harbour (bottom centre) and Pāuatahanui Inlet (top centre) viewed from the ISS.

== See also ==
- Porirua
- Kāpiti Coast
- Mana Island
- Wellington Harbour
