= Urupā =

Burial site in Māori culture

Urupā are traditional Māori cemeteries in New Zealand. These burial grounds hold significant cultural and spiritual importance for Māori communities as sacred places where ancestors are laid to rest.

== Etymology ==
The word urupā comes from the Māori language, where uru means "to enter" or "to go into," and pā refers to a fortified village or settlement. Collectively, urupā is understood as a place of burial or cemetery.

== History and significance ==
Prior to colonisation, Māori death practices involved suspending the tūpāpaku ('corpse') in a tree, allowing the flesh to decay in the open air. After this, the bones would be collected and interred in secret burial locations (wāhi tapu). After colonisation, Māori widely adopted more western burial practices, with burial grounds associated closely to important cultural locations such as marae. These burial sites—which in many cases resemble standard western cemeteries, including headstones—are known as urupā.

Under New Zealand law, tribal burial sites are exempt from the Burial and Cremation Act 1964, so that Māori can practice their own burial customs.

Urupā are culturally important sites to Māori, representing a major part of their connection with the whenua ('land').

== See also ==
- Māori culture
- Tangihanga
