= 1983 Porirua City Council election =

- 8 October 1983

The 1983 Porirua City Council election was part of the 1983 New Zealand local elections, to elect members to sub-national councils and boards. The polling was conducted using the first-past-the-post electoral method.

== Council ==
The Porirua City Council following the 1983 election consisted of a mayor and sixteen councillors elected from six wards (Pukerua Bay, Plimmerton-Paremata, Whitby, Tairangi, Cannons Creek and Titahi Bay).

=== Mayor ===
1983 Porirua mayoral election
Party	Candidate	Votes	%	±%
Labour	John Burke	5,392	41.18	
Independent	Maxine Arnold	3,824	29.20	
Independent	Charles Hudson	3,033	23.16	
Mana Motuhake	Mark Metekingi	742	5.66	
Informal votes		101	0.77	−0.33
Majority		1,568	11.97	
Turnout		13,092		

==== Ward One, Pukerua Bay Ward ====
The Pukerua Bay Ward elected one member to the Porirua City Council

Pukerua Bay Ward
Party	Candidate	Votes	%	±%
Independent	Bill Taylor	498	73.02	
Independent	Wayne Marshall	184	26.97	
Majority		314	46.04	
Turnout		682		

==== Ward Two, Plimmerton-Paremata Ward ====
The Plimmerton-Paremata Ward elected three members to the Porirua City Council

Plimmerton-Paremata Ward
Party	Candidate	Votes	%	±%
Independent	Charles Hudson	2,085	91.89	
Independent	Jenny Brash	1,725	76.02	
Independent	Jan Bennett	1,638	72.19	
Independent	Alwyn Parry	1,358	59.85	
Majority		280	12.34	
Turnout		2,269		

==== Ward Three, Whitby Ward ====
The Whitby Ward elected one member to the Porirua City Council

Whitby Ward
Party	Candidate	Votes	%	±%
Independent	Neville Peach	448	58.94	
Independent	Pat Clarke	312	41.06	
Majority		136	17.90	
Turnout		760		

==== Ward Four, Tairangi Ward ====
The Tairangi Ward elected three members to the Porirua City Council

Tairangi Ward
Party	Candidate	Votes	%	±%
Labour	Raewyn Hunter	1,046	70.86	
Labour	Matthew Nolan	980	66.39	
Labour	Tom Janes	905	61.31	
Independent	William Nathan	478	32.38	
Independent	Teremoana Hodges	438	29.67	
Independent	Bruce Copeman	421	28.52	
Socialist Unity	John Van de Ven	159	10.77	
Majority		427	28.92	
Turnout		1,476		

==== Ward Five, Cannons Creek Ward ====
The Cannons Creek Ward elected four members to the Porirua City Council

Cannons Creek Ward
Party	Candidate	Votes	%	±%
Labour	Sandra Meredith	1,783	68.65	
Labour	Elaine Annandale	1,536	59.14	
Labour	Hec Stuart	1,456	56.06	
Independent	Bill Hereweni	1,267	48.78	
Labour	David Isaia	1,205	46.39	
Independent	Robert Telfer	1,131	43.55	
Independent	Melville Williams	1,117	43.01	
Independent	Sonny Hosking	553	21.29	
Socialist Unity	Ken Stanton	338	13.01	
Majority		62	2.38	
Turnout		2,597		

==== Ward Six, Titahi Bay Ward ====
The Titahi Bay Ward elected four members to the Porirua City Council

Titahi Bay Ward
Party	Candidate	Votes	%	±%
Independent	Maxine Arnold	2,025	59.15	
Labour	John Burke (Note: As Burke won the Mayoralty his election to the council was voided and his seat was awarded to the highest polling unsuccessful candidate.)	1,866	54.51	
Values	Helen Smith	1,578	46.09	
Labour	Eric McKenzie	1,246	36.40	
Independent	Ivan Hardgrave	1,087	31.75	
Independent	Rex Willing	968	28.27	
Labour	David Stanley	964	28.16	
Independent	Alf Mexted	943	27.54	
Labour	Phil O'Connell	870	25.41	
Independent	Dennis Hansen	666	19.45	
Mana Motuhake	Mark Metekingi	632	18.46	
Independent	Mere Grant	424	12.38	
Independent	Thomas Kenny	422	12.32	
Majority		119	3.47	
Turnout		3,423		

Table footnotes:

== Other local elections ==
=== Wellington Regional Council ===
==== Porirua Ward ====
The Porirua Ward elected two members to the Wellington Regional Council

Porirua Ward
Party	Candidate	Votes	%	±%
Independent	Maxine Arnold	7,158	61.85	+20.58
Independent	Whitford Brown	6,489	56.07	+2.64
Labour	Eric McKenzie	4,414	38.14	+7.41
Labour	Sandra Meredith	4,390	37.93	
Socialist Unity	Ken Stanton	693	5.98	
Majority		2,075	17.93	
Turnout		11,572		

=== Wellington Harbour Board ===
==== Porirua/Tawa Ward ====
The Porirua/Tawa Ward elected one member to the Wellington Harbour Board

Porirua/Tawa Ward
Party	Candidate	Votes	%	±%
Independent	Dick McLaren	8,924	51.61	+30.73
Labour	Colin Beyer	7,574	43.80	
Socialist Unity	Ken Stanton	793	4.58	
Majority		1,350	7.80	
Turnout		17,291		

=== Wellington Hospital Board ===
==== Porirua/Tawa Ward ====
The Porirua/Tawa Ward elected two members to the Wellington Hospital Board

Porirua/Tawa Ward
Party	Candidate	Votes	%	±%
Independent	Marion Bruce	10,583	70.71	−23.86
Labour	Don Borrie	6,175	41.26	
Independent	Alf Mexted	5,524	36.91	
Independent	Dick McLaren	3,945	26.35	
Independent	Ian McLauchlan	3,704	24.74	
Majority		651	4.34	
Turnout		14,966		
