= Sailing at the 1968 Summer Olympics – Finn =

Sailing at the Olympics

Finn at the Games of the XIX Olympiad
- Venue: Acapulco
- Dates: 14–21 October
- Competitors: 36 from 36 nations
- Teams: 36

Medalists
1st place, gold medalist(s)		Valentin Mankin	Soviet Union
2nd place, silver medalist(s)		Hubert Raudaschl	Austria
3rd place, bronze medalist(s)		Fabio Albarelli	Italy

The Finn was a sailing event on the Sailing at the 1968 Summer Olympics program in Acapulco. Seven races were scheduled. 36 sailors, on 36 boats, from 36 nations competed.

== Results ==
Rank	Helmsman (Country)	Hull Sail No.	Race I		Race II		Race III		Race IV		Race V		Race VI		Race VII		Total Points	Total -1
Rank	Helmsman (Country)	Hull Sail No.	Rank	Points	Rank	Points	Rank	Points	Rank	Points	Rank	Points	Rank	Points	Rank	Points	Total Points	Total -1
1st place, gold medalist(s)	Valentin Mankin (URS)	SR	3	5.7	~~5~~	~~10~~	1	0	1	0	2	3	2	3	1	0	21.7	11.7
2nd place, silver medalist(s)	Hubert Raudaschl (AUT)	OE	~~14~~	~~20~~	3	5.7	3	5.7	4	8	4	8	4	8	12	18	73.4	53.4
3rd place, bronze medalist(s)	Fabio Albarelli (ITA)	I	16	22	~~27~~	~~33~~	7	13	2	3	3	5.7	3	5.7	3	5.7	88.1	55.1
4	Ronald Jenyns (AUS)	KA	4	8	1	0	~~DNF~~	~~42~~	7	13	15	21	16	22	2	3	109	67
5	Panagiotis Kouligas (GRE)	GR	15	21	12	18	8	14	5	10	1	0	~~DNF~~	~~42~~	4	8	113	71
6	Jan Winquist (FIN)	L	8	14	8	14	~~12~~	~~18~~	8	14	5	10	5	10	5	10	90	72
7	Arne Åkerson (SWE)	S	10	16	9	15	4	8	~~22~~	~~28~~	12	18	1	0	14	20	105	77
8	Philippe Soria (FRA)	F	1	0	10	16	14	20	9	15	7	~~13~~	~~25~~	31	10	16	111	80
9	Jörg Bruder (BRA)	BL	7	13	4	8	~~DNF~~	~~42~~	12	18	14	20	12	18	7	13	132	90
10	Garry Hoyt (PUR)	PR	~~21~~	~~27~~	19	25	2	3	13	19	6	11.7	13	19	8	14	118.7	91.7
11	Jonty Farmer (NZL)	KZ	13	19	2	3	6	11.7	19	25	19	25	7	13	~~DNF~~	~~40~~	136.7	96.7
12	Andrzej Zawieja (POL)	PZ	6	11.7	17	23	19	25	10	16	~~25~~	~~31~~	11	17	17	23	146.7	115.7
13	Jürgen Mier (GDR)	GO	~~DNF~~	~~42~~	14	20	5	10	26	32	9	15	23	29	6	11.7	159.7	117.7
14	Carl Van Duyne (USA)	US	DNF	42	~~DSQ~~	~~44~~	11	17	3	5.7	10	16	14	20	11	17	161.7	117.7
15	Wilhelm Kuhweide (FRG)	G	11	17	7	13	17	23	~~25~~	~~31~~	26	32	9	15	15	21	152	120
16	Alex Bally (SUI)	Z	17	23	15	21	~~24~~	~~30~~	11	17	18	24	6	11.7	22	28	154.7	124.7
17	Alberto Obarrio (ARG)	A	~~DNF~~	~~42~~	16	22	13	19	18	24	13	19	8	14	21	27	167	125
18	Henning Wind (DEN)	D	9	15	18	24	10	16	15	21	~~23~~	~~29~~	18	24	19	25	154	125
19	Boudewijn Binkhorst (NED)	H	24	~~30~~	~~DNF~~	42	21	27	6	11.7	8	14	22	28	9	15	167.7	125.7
20	Paul Henderson (CAN)	KC	19	25	~~20~~	~~26~~	9	15	20	26	16	22	10	16	16	22	152	126
21	Per Werenskiold (NOR)	N	2	3	6	11.7	16	22	21	27	~~29~~	~~35~~	31	37	24	30	165.7	128.7
22	Michael Maynard (GBR)	K	5	10	11	17	18	24	17	23	20	26	~~DNF~~	~~42~~	23	29	171	129
23	Daniel Mújica (MEX)	MX	12	18	~~DNF~~	~~42~~	15	21	36	42	21	27	17	23	18	24	197	155
24	Jay Hooper (BER)	KB	20	26	13	19	22	28	23	29	17	23	~~DNF~~	~~42~~	DNS	42	209	167
25	Jacques Rogge (BEL)	B	18	24	21	27	~~DSQ~~	~~44~~	24	30	32	38	21	27	20	26	216	172
26	Fernando Thode (URU)	U	26	32	~~DNF~~	~~42~~	23	29	14	20	11	17	DNF	42	27	33	215	173
27	Juan Ignacio Sirvent (ESP)	E	23	29	~~DNF~~	~~42~~	DNF	42	16	22	22	28	29	35	13	19	217	175
28	Kenneth Albury (BAH)	BA	22	28	23	29	26	32	31	37	24	30	15	21	~~DNS~~	~~42~~	219	177
29	Philip Wijewardene (CEY)	CY	25	31	24	30	28	34	28	34	~~30~~	~~36~~	20	26	26	32	223	187
30	Karsten Boysen (VEN)	V	29	35	26	32	20	26	29	35	28	34	19	25	~~DNF~~	~~40~~	227	187
31	Bernardo Silva (POR)	P	27	33	25	31	25	31	30	36	27	33	26	32	~~DNF~~	~~40~~	236	196
32	Per Dohm (ISV)	VI	28	34	22	28	27	33	32	38	~~31~~	~~37~~	28	34	25	31	235	197
33	Rachot Kanjanavanit (THA)	TH	~~DNF~~	~~42~~	28	34	29	35	27	33	33	39	27	33	28	34	250	208
34	Carlos Ruiz (ESA)	SL	31	37	29	35	30	36	33	39	~~DNF~~	~~42~~	24	30	29	35	254	212
35	Robert Lucas (INA)	RI	30	36	~~DNF~~	~~42~~	31	37	35	41	34	40	30	36	DNF	40	272	230
36	Manuel Villareal (PHI)	PH	DNF	42	~~DNF~~	~~42~~	32	38	34	40	35	41	32	38	DNF	40	281	239

DNF = Did Not Finish, DNS= Did Not Start, DSQ = Disqualified
= Male, = Female

=== Daily standings ===
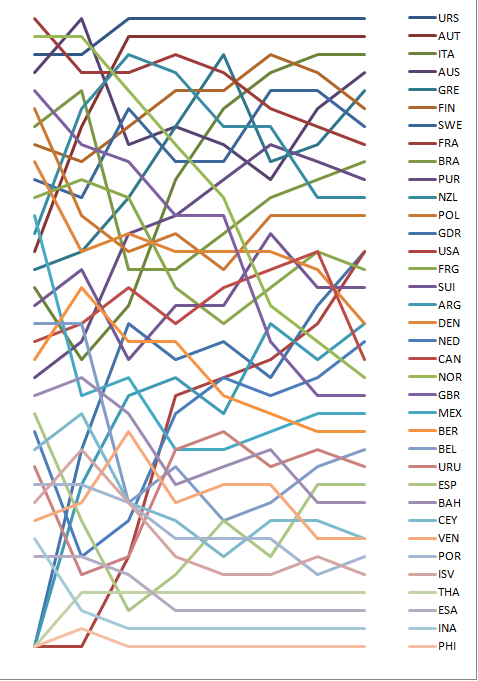
Graph showing the daily standings in the Finn during the 1968 Summer Olympics

== Conditions at Acapulco ==
Of the total of three race areas were needed during the Olympics in Acapulco. Each of the classes was new Olympic scoring system.

Date	Race	Weather	Temperature (Celsius)	Wind direction (deg)	Wind speed (kn)	Sea	Current (kn-deg)
14 October 1968	I	Fair	34	280	15	Calm	0.25-165
15 October 1968	II	Fair	34	280	16	Calm	0.2-140
16 October 1968	III	Fair	34	270	10	Calm	0.2-130
17 October 1968	IV	Fair	36	215	7	Calm	0.3-300
19 October 1968	V	Normal	40	185	7	Calm	0.2-310
20 October 1968	VI	Fair	35	240	6	Calm	0.25-260
21 October 1968	VII	Cloudy	34	275	12	Choppy	0.8-100
