= 1968 Porirua mayoral election =

← 1965	12 October 1968	1971 →
- Turnout: 3,500
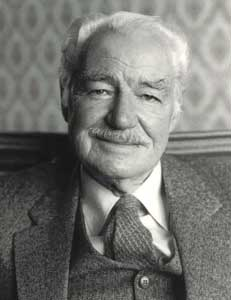

Candidate	Whitford Brown	Rairi Field
Party	Independent	Ind. Progressive
Popular vote	2,158	1,287
Percentage	61.65	36.77
Mayor before election
Whitford Brown
Elected mayor
Whitford Brown

The 1968 Porirua mayoral election was part of the New Zealand local elections held that same year. The elections were held for the role of Mayor of Porirua plus other local government positions including ten city councillors, also elected triennially. The polling was conducted using the standard first-past-the-post electoral method.

== Background ==
The incumbent Mayor, Whitford Brown, sought re-election for a third term. He was opposed by Rairi Christian Field, who had stood against Brown in 1962. He led an independent progressive ticket organised by the Progress for Porirua Association. Councillor Bill Arnold's wife, Maxine Arnold, was elected to the Porirua District Licensing Trust, believed to be the first woman in New Zealand to win a seat on a licensing trust. Two successful council candidates on election night (Alf Mexted and John Stewart Kenward) were unseated with the counting of late votes.

== Mayoral results ==
1968 Porirua mayoral election
Party	Candidate	Votes	%	±%
Independent	Whitford Brown	2,158	61.65	−26.29
Ind. Progressive	Rairi Field	1,287	36.77	
Informal votes		55	1.57	+1.00
Majority		871	24.88	−51.58
Turnout		3,500		

== Councillor results ==
1968 Porirua City Council election
Party	Candidate	Votes	%	±%
Independent	Whitford Brown (Note: As Brown won the Mayoralty his election to the council was voided and his seat was awarded to the highest polling unsuccessful candidate.)	1,815	64.68	−6.33
Labour	Tutuira Wi Neera	1,629	58.05	+5.21
Ind. Progressive	Puoho Katene	1,544	55.02	
Independent	Jill Nixon	1,495	53.27	−9.85
Labour	George Moke	1,480	52.74	
Labour	Ted Taylor	1,477	52.63	+14.90
Independent	Bill Arnold	1,475	52.56	+6.69
Labour	Rex Willing	1,315	46.86	
Ind. Progressive	Hec Stuart	1,289	45.93	
Ind. Progressive	Mary Bannerman	1,273	45.36	
Ind. Progressive	Matuaiwi Solomon	1,270	45.26	+1.83
Independent	Alf Mexted	1,260	44.90	−3.11
Independent	John Stewart Kenward	1,236	44.04	
Ind. Progressive	Jim Slader	1,174	41.83	
Ind. Progressive	Malcolm John Frost	1,124	40.05	
Ind. Progressive	Michael Benefield	1,101	39.23	
Labour	Frank McIlwee	1,075	38.31	
Ind. Progressive	Robert Raymond Cater	1,058	37.70	
Independent	James Hamilton Wilson	978	34.85	−11.72
Ind. Progressive	Richard John Neville Conway	871	31.04	
Independent	Maureen Shuker	839	29.90	
Ind. Progressive	Terence O'Connor	720	25.65	
Independent	Athol Royd Gardiner Clayton	693	24.69	
Labour	Sydney Leonard Elliott	667	23.77	
Independent	Robert Laird Scott	592	21.09	
Communist	Jack Manson	431	15.35	+1.94

Table footnotes:
