= Sailing at the 1964 Summer Olympics – Finn =

Sailing at the Olympics

Finn at the Games of the XVIII Olympiad
- Venue: Enoshima
- Competitors: 33 from 33 nations
- Teams: 33

Medalists
1st place, gold medalist(s)		Willy Kuhweide	United Team of Germany
2nd place, silver medalist(s)		Peter Barrett	United States
3rd place, bronze medalist(s)		Henning Wind	Denmark

The Finn was a sailing event on the Sailing at the 1964 Summer Olympics program in Enoshima. Seven races were scheduled. 33 sailors on 33 boats, from 33 nations competed.

== Results ==
Rank	Helmsman (Country)	Hull Sail No.	Race I		Race II		Race III		Race IV		Race V		Race VI		Race VII		Total Points	Total -1
Rank	Helmsman (Country)	Hull Sail No.	Rank	Points	Rank	Points	Rank	Points	Rank	Points	Rank	Points	Rank	Points	Rank	Points	Total Points	Total -1
1st place, gold medalist(s)	Willy Kuhweide (EUA)	G 10	2	1318	1	1620	4	1017	~~6~~	~~841~~	5	921	3	1142	1	1620	8479	7638
2nd place, silver medalist(s)	Peter Barrett (USA)	US; 40	1	1620	3	1142	~~DNF~~	~~101~~	7	774	3	1142	5	921	7	774	6474	6373
3rd place, bronze medalist(s)	Henning Wind (DEN)	D 7	14	473	~~20~~	~~318~~	3	1142	4	1017	2	1318	1	1620	10	620	6508	6190
4	Peter Mander (NZL)	KZ; 26	8	716	4	1017	6	841	8	716	1	1620	7	774	~~19~~	~~341~~	6025	5684
5	Hubert Raudaschl (AUT)	OE; 31	~~DNF~~	~~101~~	7	774	2	1318	9	665	9	665	2	1318	9	665	5506	5405
6	Colin Ryrie (AUS)	KA; 18	3	1142	~~22~~	~~277~~	1	1620	15	443	11	578	4	1017	14	473	5550	5273
7	Jörg Bruder (BRA)	BL; 4	~~19~~	~~341~~	8	716	5	921	12	540	10	620	6	841	2	1318	5297	4956
8	Panagiotis Koulingas (GRE)	GR; 11	5	921	2	1318	14	473	16	415	6	841	11	578	~~DSQ~~	~~0~~	4546	4546
9	Gérard Devillard (FRA)	F 9	11	578	~~17~~	~~389~~	8	716	1	1620	13	506	9	665	15	443	4917	4528
10	André Nelis (BEL)	B 2	~~23~~	~~258~~	14	473	7	774	2	1318	12	540	8	716	17	389	4468	4210
11	Bruce Kirby (CAN)	KC; 20	12	540	5	921	~~DNF~~	~~101~~	24	239	4	1017	10	620	6	841	4279	4178
12	Aleksandr Chuchelov (URS)	SR; 37	26	205	16	415	21	297	3	1142	17	389	17	389	3	1142	3979	3774
13	György Fináczy (HUN)	M 28	7	774	11	578	11	578	13	506	20	318	~~DNF~~	~~101~~	4	1017	3872	3771
14	Boris Jacobson (SWE)	S 36	17	389	~~19~~	~~341~~	12	540	5	921	16	415	13	506	5	921	4033	3692
15	Per Jordbakke (NOR)	N 30	9	665	10	620	9	665	11	578	15	443	~~DNF~~	~~101~~	8	716	3788	3687
16	Hans Willems (NED)	H 12	4	1017	13	506	16	415	14	473	~~23~~	~~258~~	18	364	13	506	3539	3281
17	Michael McFadden (RHO)	KR; 24	6	841	~~27~~	~~188~~	10	620	17	389	7	774	23	258	24	239	3309	3121
18	Miroslav Vejvoda (TCH)	CZ; 6	16	415	24	239	~~DNF~~	~~101~~	10	620	8	716	12	540	12	540	3171	3070
19	Hélder d'Oliveira (POR)	P 32	10	620	9	665	18	364	~~25~~	~~222~~	27	188	15	443	22	277	2779	2591
20	Jay Hooper (BER)	KB; 19	~~DNF~~	~~101~~	6	841	19	341	20	318	21	297	22	277	16	415	2590	2489
21	Takashi Yamada (JPN)	J 16	18	364	~~21~~	~~297~~	17	389	18	364	14	473	20	318	11	578	2783	2486
22	Brian Saffery-Cooper (GBR)	K 17	15	443	18	364	13	506	~~27~~	~~188~~	19	341	14	473	20	318	2633	2445
23	Johnny Hooper (IRL)	IR; 15	21	297	15	443	~~DNF~~	~~101~~	23	258	18	364	19	341	21	297	2101	2000
24	Peter Cooke (KEN)	KK; 23	13	506	12	540	24	239	~~28~~	~~172~~	28	172	26	205	26	205	2039	1867
25	Haluk Kakış (TUR)	TK; 39	~~27~~	~~188~~	26	205	15	443	22	277	22	277	21	297	18	364	2051	1863
26	Ricardo Boneo (ARG)	A 1	20	318	23	258	25	222	19	341	25	222	~~28~~	~~172~~	25	222	1755	1583
27	Juan Olabarri (ESP)	E 8	25	222	~~DNF~~	~~101~~	DNF	101	21	297	24	239	16	415	23	258	1633	1532
28	Alan Stevens (HKG)	KH; 21	22	277	25	222	20	318	26	205	26	205	25	222	~~DNF~~	~~101~~	1550	1449
29	Karsten Boysen (VEN)	V 41	29	157	28	172	22	277	29	157	~~DNF~~	~~101~~	24	239	27	188	1291	1190
30	Rachot Kanjanavanit (THA)	TH; 38	28	172	29	157	~~DNF~~	~~101~~	30	142	29	157	27	188	29	157	1074	973
31	Juan R. Torruella (PUR)	PR; 34	~~DNF~~	~~101~~	DNF	101	23	258	31	128	30	142	29	157	28	172	1059	958
32	Fernando Ortiz Monasterio (MEX)	MX; 29	24	239	DNF	101	DNF	101	DNF	101	DNF	101	30	142	~~DNS~~	~~0~~	785	785
33	Touch Kim Sy (CAM)	CA; 5	30	142	~~DSQ~~	~~0~~	DNF	101	32	114	DNS	0	DNS	0	DNS	0	357	357

DNF = Did Not Finish, DNS= Did Not Start, DSQ = Disqualified
= Male, = Female

=== Daily standings ===
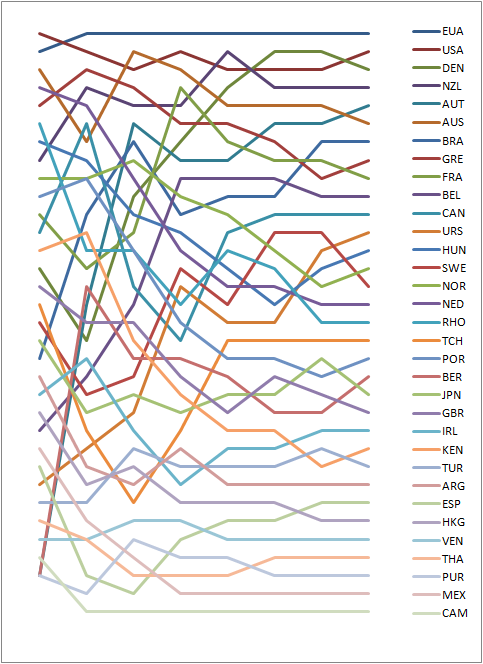
Graph showing the daily standings in the Finn during the 1964 Summer Olympics

== Conditions at Enoshima ==
Of the total of three race areas were needed during the Olympics in Enoshima. Each of the classes was using the same scoring system. The center course was used for the Finn.

Date	Race	Weather	Wind direction	Wind speed (m/s)
12 October 1964	I	Fine	E	3
13 October 1964	II	Cloudy	NNE	3
14 October 1964	III	Cloudy	N	12
15 October 1964	IV	Fine	NE	8
19 October 1964	V	Fine	NNE	5
20 October 1964	VI	Cloudy	N	5
21 October 1964	VII	Cloudy	SSW	5
