= 1977 Porirua mayoral election =

← 1974	8 October 1977	1980 →
- Turnout: 10,875 (62.14%)
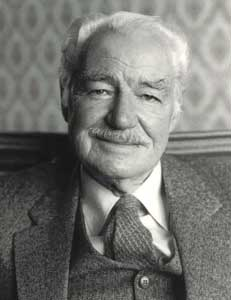

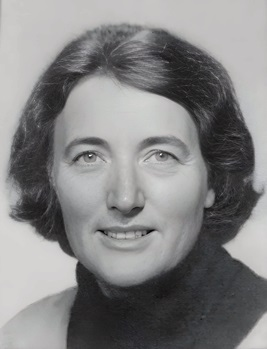

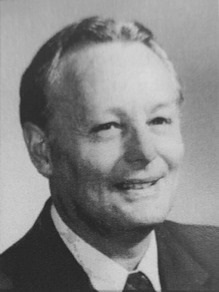
Candidate	Whitford Brown	Helen Smith	Alastair Maclean
Party	Independent	Values	Labour
Popular vote	4,526	3,208	2,226
Percentage	41.61	29.49	20.46
Mayor before election
Whitford Brown
Elected mayor
Whitford Brown

The 1977 Porirua mayoral election was part of the New Zealand local elections held that same year. The elections were held for the role of Mayor of Porirua plus other local government positions including fifteen city councillors, also elected triennially. The polling was conducted using the standard first-past-the-post electoral method.

== Background ==
The incumbent Mayor, Whitford Brown, sought re-election for a sixth term. In 1975 Brown had been caught and convicted of driving under the influence of alcohol. He spent time afterward, including during the election campaign, in treatment for alcoholism at Hanmer Springs. Four councillors challenged him including two official party candidates from Labour and the Values Party. Brown had been an active Labour member in the past and was endorsed by Labour in all previous elections. Two other former Labour ticket councillors (Ted Taylor and Rex Willing) also challenged Brown. For standing as an independent against the official Labour ticket, Willing was later expelled from the party.

== Mayoral results ==
1977 Porirua mayoral election
Party	Candidate	Votes	%	±%
Independent	Whitford Brown	4,526	41.61	−29.49
Values	Helen Smith	3,208	29.49	
Labour	Alastair Maclean	2,226	20.46	
Independent	Ted Taylor	510	4.68	−22.40
Independent	Rex Willing	405	3.72	
Majority		1,318	12.11	−31.90
Turnout		10,875	62.14	

== Councillor results ==
1977 Porirua City Council election
Party	Candidate	Votes	%	±%
Porirua Ward (12 vacancies)
Labour	George Moke	5,046	61.40	+2.19
Labour	John Burke	4,713	53.33	−9.80
Values	Helen Smith	4,632	52.59	−14.80
Labour	Margaret Brown	4,500	51.37	
Labour	Pamela Ann Jackson	4,174	48.38	
Independent	Maxine Arnold	4,076	46.48	−9.49
Labour	Ivan Hardgrave	4,019	46.95	+2.36
Labour	David Isaia	4,019	46.95	+3.50
Labour	Terry O'Brien	3,809	45.02	+1.34
Labour	Tom Janes	3,791	44.85	
Labour	Eric McKenzie	3,741	44.40	
Independent	Hec Stuart	3,552	42.66	−11.05
Labour	Phil O'Connell	3,476	41.96	+6.26
Labour	James Clark	3,444	41.66	
Independent	Peter Church	2,943	37.06	−11.97
Labour	Gavin Seamark	2,860	36.29	
Independent	Rex Willing	2,822	35.94	−5.37
Independent	Alf Mexted	2,389	31.96	−11.17
Independent	Aileen Dette	2,364	31.73	−19.11
Independent	John Barnett	2,344	31.55	
Independent	Lester Dobson	2,076	29.08	
Socialist Action	Ken Stanton	1,292	21.88	
Taupo Ward (2 vacancies)
Independent	Jan Bennett	unopposed		
Independent	Colin Beyer	unopposed		
Pukerua Bay Ward (1 vacancy)
Independent	Ferdinand Dreyer	344	51.42	
Values	William Dyas	325	48.58	
