= 1980 Porirua mayoral election =

Election for mayor of Porirua, New Zealand

← 1977	11 October 1980	1983 →
- Turnout: 11,540
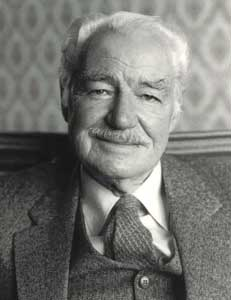

Candidate	Whitford Brown	Eric McKenzie
Party	Independent	Labour
Popular vote	8,250	3,174
Percentage	71.49	27.50
Mayor before election
Whitford Brown
Elected mayor
Whitford Brown

The 1980 Porirua mayoral election was part of the New Zealand local elections held that same year. The elections were held for the role of Mayor of Porirua plus other local government positions including fifteen city councillors, also elected triennially. The polling was conducted using the standard first-past-the-post electoral method.

== Background ==
Prior to the election there was a minor controversy on the council. In early 1980 Porirua's Town Clerk, Gordon Gandell, retired. The former deputy mayor of neighbouring Lower Hutt, John Seddon, was employed for the role. Allegations ensued that his appointment had been a "jack up" by the Labour majority on the city council and his friendship with deputy mayor John Burke. A group of senior Porirua City Council officers jointly signed a letter during the appointment row saying he wasn't the right man for the job. Seddon was not an accountant, the usual prior professional qualification of town clerks at that time, but he had been responsible for managing a company with three times the asset turnover of the Porirua City Council. Ombudsman Lester Castle was called in and eventually cleared the appointment process as being sufficiently objective. Labour lost their council majority at the election which was attributed to the employment controversy. Several Labour councillors were dumped from the party ticket prior to the election. One, Ivan Hardgrave, stood instead as an independent candidate and was successful.

The election also saw the introduction of a new party to contest control of the council with the emergence of the Rates Reform ticket. Founded in early 1979, the Rates Reform group accused local bodies of excessive spending and wanted a cessation to rates increases funded by cutting services and council staff.

== Mayoral results ==
1980 Porirua mayoral election
Party	Candidate	Votes	%	±%
Independent	Whitford Brown	8,250	71.49	+29.88
Labour	Eric McKenzie	3,174	27.50	
Informal votes		116	1.00	
Majority		5,076	43.98	+31.87
Turnout		11,540		

== Councillor results ==
1980 Porirua City Council election
Party	Candidate	Votes	%	±%
Porirua Ward (12 vacancies)
Independent	Maxine Arnold	4,514	64.54	+18.06
Labour	John Burke	3,931	56.20	+2.87
Labour	Margaret Brown	3,791	54.20	+2.83
Values	Helen Smith	3,668	52.44	−0.15
Labour	Eric McKenzie	3,585	51.25	+6.85
Independent	Bill Herewini	3,550	50.75	
Independent	Rex Willing	3,500	50.04	+14.10
Independent	Alf Mexted	3,453	49.37	+17.41
Labour	Colin Beyer	3,243	46.36	
Independent	Ivan Hardgrave	3,227	46.13	−0.82
Labour	Tom Janes	2,999	42.87	−1.98
Labour	Sandra Meredith	2,954	42.23	
Independent	Kenneth Budge	2,886	41.26	
Labour	James Clark	2,883	41.22	−0.44
Labour	Alan Sketchley	2,838	40.57	
Labour	Phil O'Connell	2,830	40.46	−1.50
Labour	David Isaia	2,805	40.10	−6.85
Labour	David Stanley	2,564	36.65	
Rates Reform	Estelle Brittain	2,386	34.11	
Labour	Connie Mato	2,385	34.10	
Independent	Edward Davis	2,296	32.82	
Independent	Robert Hosking	2,128	30.42	
Rates Reform	John Barnett	2,113	30.21	−1.34
Rates Reform	James Brittain	1,924	27.50	
Independent	Lester Dobson	1,792	25.62	−3.46
Rates Reform	Clifford Chadwick	1,674	23.93	
Independent	Pati Taulapapa	1,549	22.14	
Rates Reform	Kaye Kerslake	1,547	22.11	
Mana Motuhake	Mark Metekingi	1,515	21.66	
Rates Reform	Leslie Furnell	1,340	19.15	
Mana Motuhake	Sam Tekira	794	11.35	
Mana Motuhake	Sarai Fano	666	9.52	
Socialist Unity	John Van de Ven	517	7.39	
Taupo Ward (2 vacancies)
Independent	Jan Bennett	1,472	63.66	
Independent	Murray Goodman	1,061	45.89	
Independent	Neville Peach	642	27.76	
Ind. Progressive	Kenneth Huntington	548	23.70	
Independent	Keith Rolston	542	23.44	
Independent	Robert Harper	360	15.57	
Pukerua Bay Ward (1 vacancy)
Independent	Wayne Marshall	unopposed		
