= 1965 Porirua mayoral election =

← 1962	9 October 1965	1968 →
- Turnout: 2,422
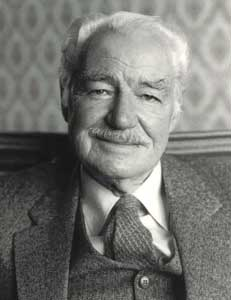

Candidate	Whitford Brown	Alf Mexted
Party	Independent	Independent
Popular vote	2,130	278
Percentage	87.94	11.47
Mayor before election
Whitford Brown
Elected mayor
Whitford Brown

The 1965 Porirua mayoral election was part of the New Zealand local elections held that same year. The elections were held for the role of Mayor of Porirua plus other local government positions including ten city councillors, also elected triennially. The polling was conducted using the standard first-past-the-post electoral method.

== Background ==
This was the first election held after Porirua's proclamation as a city by the Governor-General earlier the same month on 2 October. The incumbent mayor, Whitford Brown, was decisively re-elected over councillor Alf Mexted. Both mayoral candidates stood for the city council as well and were successful. (Note: As Brown won the Mayoralty his election to the council was voided and his seat was awarded to the highest polling unsuccessful candidate.)

== Mayoral results ==
1965 Porirua mayoral election
Party	Candidate	Votes	%	±%
Independent	Whitford Brown	2,130	87.94	+51.47
Independent	Alf Mexted	278	11.47	+5.95
Informal votes		14	0.57	−0.29
Majority		1,852	76.46	+67.48
Turnout		2,422		

== Councillor results ==
1965 Porirua City Council election
Party	Candidate	Votes	%	±%
Independent	Whitford Brown	1,720	71.01	+8.79
Independent	Jill Nixon	1,529	63.12	+7.10
Independent	Ernie Maxwell	1,361	56.19	+6.17
Independent	Donald Collins	1,357	56.02	+15.93
Independent	Leslie Duncan Ayson	1,350	55.73	
Labour	Tutuira Wi Neera	1,280	52.84	
Independent	Alf Mexted	1,163	48.01	+5.69
Independent	Benjamin David Hart	1,148	47.39	
Independent	James Hamilton Wilson	1,128	46.57	−2.38
Independent	Bill Arnold	1,111	45.87	+1.27
Labour	Richard Joseph Archer	1,079	44.54	
Labour	Frances Mary Bould	1,067	44.05	
Independent	Matuaiwi Solomon	1,052	43.43	+2.81
Labour	Jim Hunter	954	39.38	
Labour	Ted Taylor	914	37.73	
Labour	Ernest Lionel Tregoweth	847	34.97	
Independent	Stanley Albert Humphries	633	26.13	
Communist	Mary Hepinstall	332	13.70	
Communist	Jack Manson	325	13.41	

Table footnotes:
