= Michael Maynard =

Michael Maynard may refer to:

- Michael Maynard (cricketer) (born 1976), Barbadian cricketer
- Michael Maynard (sailor) (1937–2023), British sailor
- Mike Maynard (footballer) Guyanese footballer

== See also ==
- Mike Maynard, American football coach
