= 1974 Porirua mayoral election =

← 1971	12 October 1974	1977 →
- Turnout: 6,879
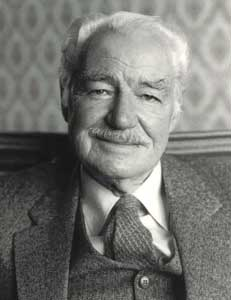

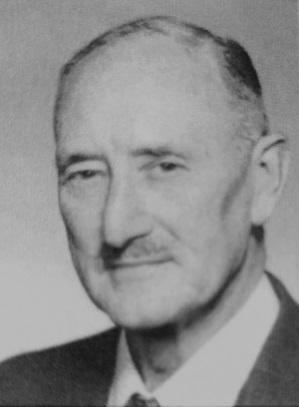
Candidate	Whitford Brown	Ted Taylor
Party	Independent	Independent
Popular vote	4,891	1,863
Percentage	71.10	27.08
Mayor before election
Whitford Brown
Elected mayor
Whitford Brown

The 1974 Porirua mayoral election was part of the New Zealand local elections held that same year. The elections were held for the role of Mayor of Porirua plus other local government positions including fifteen city councillors, also elected triennially. The polling was conducted using the standard first-past-the-post electoral method.

== Background ==
The incumbent Mayor, Whitford Brown, sought re-election for a fifth term. He was opposed by Labour Party councillor Ted Taylor, who opted to run as an independent. Brown was re-elected comfortably and while losing the mayoralty Taylor was re-elected for the city council.

This was the first election after the areas of Camborne, Paremata, Pāuatahanui, Plimmerton, Pukerua Bay and Whitby were added to Porirua City from Hutt County on 1 April 1973. The electoral ridings of Taupo and Pukerua Bay became wards of Porirua City.

== Mayoral results ==
1974 Porirua mayoral election
Party	Candidate	Votes	%	±%
Independent	Whitford Brown	4,891	71.10	−7.76
Independent	Ted Taylor	1,863	27.08	
Informal votes		125	1.81	−0.44
Majority		3,028	44.01	−15.98
Turnout		6,879		

== Councillor results ==
1974 Porirua City Council election
Party	Candidate	Votes	%	±%
Porirua Ward (12 vacancies)
Values	Helen Smith	2,720	67.39	+32.66
Labour	John Burke	2,548	63.13	+20.12
Labour	George Moke	2,390	59.21	−2.41
Independent	Maxine Arnold	2,259	55.97	+51.47
Ind. Progressive	Ned Nathan	2,191	54.28	+7.98
Ind. Progressive	Hec Stuart	2,168	53.71	+1.04
Labour	Aileen Dette	2,052	50.84	
Ind. Progressive	Puoho Katene	2,022	50.09	−3.75
Labour	Peter Church	1,979	49.03	
Independent	Ted Taylor	1,950	48.31	−4.44
Labour	Ivan Hardgrave	1,800	44.59	
Ind. Progressive	Gary McCormick	1,765	43.73	
Labour	Terry O'Brien	1,763	43.68	+0.97
Labour	David Isaia	1,754	43.45	
Independent	Alf Mexted	1,741	43.13	−6.25
Ind. Progressive	Philip Ward	1,600	39.64	
Ind. Progressive	Diana Margaret Fulton	1,479	36.64	
Ind. Progressive	Noel William Donaldson	1,461	36.19	
Labour	Phillip O'Connell	1,441	35.70	
Labour	Raea Tagaha Puni	1,457	36.10	
Labour	Ruhina McNaught	1,423	35.25	
Labour	Tagipo Faanana	1,381	34.21	
Labour	Thomas Tai	1,317	32.63	
Ind. Progressive	Murray Harold Robertson	1,164	28.84	
Ind. Progressive	Geoffrey Nelson Rice	1,139	28.22	
Ind. Progressive	Norman Keith Crossley	1,104	27.35	
Independent	Edward Henry Groombridge	994	24.62	
Independent	Rio Nia	781	19.35	
Independent	Anthony McCarthy	597	14.79	
Taupo Ward (2 vacancies)
Independent	Ken Gray	845	73.28	
Ind. Progressive	Fred Duckworth	642	55.68	
Ind. Progressive	Margaret Janssen	490	42.49	
Independent	Richard Bruce Ferguson	330	28.62	
Pukerua Bay Ward (1 vacancy)
Labour	Alastair Maclean	219	50.94	
Ind. Progressive	Phillip Leigh Gamby	211	49.06	
