= Alan Stevens =

Alan Stevens may also refer to:

- Alan Stevens (footballer) (born 1923), Australian football player
- Alan Stevens (sailor) (born 1933), Hong Kong Olympic sailor
- Alan Stevens (writer), British science fiction writer
- Alan Stevens, former chief executive of Central Railway

== See also ==
- Alan Stephens (born 1952), English former footballer
- Alan Stephenson (born 1944), former footballer
- Alan Stevenson (1807–1865), Scottish lighthouse engineer
- Alan Stevenson (footballer) (born 1950), English former footballer
