= 1971 Porirua mayoral election =

| ← 1968 | 9 October 1971 | 1974 → |
- Turnout: 4,344
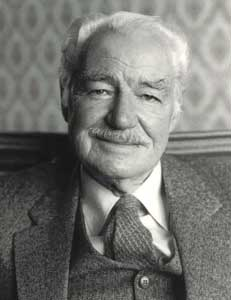

| Candidate | Whitford Brown | Bill Arnold |
| Party | Independent | Independent |
| Popular vote | 3,426 | 820 |
| Percentage | 78.86 | 18.87 |
Mayor before election
Whitford Brown
Elected mayor
Whitford Brown

The 1971 Porirua mayoral election was part of the New Zealand local elections held that same year. The elections were held for the role of Mayor of Porirua plus other local government positions including twelve city councillors, also elected triennially. The polling was conducted using the standard first-past-the-post electoral method.

== Background ==
The incumbent Mayor, Whitford Brown, sought re-election for a fourth term. He was opposed by councillor Bill Arnold. Brown was re-elected in a landslide result. Although polling poorly for the mayoralty, Arnold was re-elected comfortably for the city council.

== Mayoral results ==
1971 Porirua mayoral election
| Party | Candidate | Votes | % | ±% |
|---|---|---|---|---|
| Independent | Whitford Brown | 3,426 | 78.86 | +17.21 |
| Independent | Bill Arnold | 820 | 18.87 | |
| Informal votes | | 98 | 2.25 | +0.68 |
| Majority | | 2,606 | 59.99 | +35.11 |
| Turnout | | 4,344 | | |

== Councillor results ==
1971 Porirua City Council election
| Party | Candidate | Votes | % | ±% |
|---|---|---|---|---|
| Ind. Progressive | Mary Bannerman | 2,167 | 63.62 | +18.26 |
| Labour | George Moke | 2,099 | 61.62 | +8.88 |
| Labour | Tutuira Wi Neera | 2,052 | 60.24 | +2.19 |
| Independent | Bill Arnold | 2,000 | 58.71 | +6.15 |
| Labour | Rex Willing | 1,879 | 55.16 | +8.30 |
| Ind. Progressive | Puoho Katene | 1,834 | 53.84 | −1.18 |
| Labour | Aileen Dette | 1,821 | 53.46 | |
| Labour | Ted Taylor | 1,797 | 52.75 | +0.12 |
| Ind. Progressive | Hec Stuart | 1,794 | 52.67 | +6.74 |
| Independent | Alf Mexted | 1,682 | 49.38 | +4.48 |
| Ind. Progressive | Ned Nathan | 1,577 | 46.30 | |
| Labour | John Burke | 1,465 | 43.01 | |
| Labour | Terry O'Brien | 1,455 | 42.71 | |
| Independent | Frank McIlwee | 1,453 | 42.66 | +4.35 |
| Labour | Ronald Elliott | 1,441 | 42.30 | |
| Labour | Frances Hunter | 1,312 | 38.52 | |
| Labour | Afano Sua | 1,261 | 37.02 | |
| Independent | John Thompson | 1,243 | 36.49 | |
| Ind. Progressive | Jim Slader | 1,217 | 35.73 | −6.10 |
| Independent | John Harvey | 1,049 | 30.79 | |
| Independent | Tagipo Faanana | 1,046 | 30.71 | |
| Independent | Ian Parker | 976 | 28.65 | |
| Ind. Progressive | Stella Harley | 950 | 27.89 | |
| Independent | Wera Valentine Couch | 918 | 26.95 | |
| Labour | Eric Lloyd | 904 | 26.54 | |
| Independent | Alastair Wilson | 885 | 25.98 | |
| Independent | Terence Lewis Lloyd | 698 | 20.49 | |
| Independent | Welby Charles McMurtle | 573 | 16.82 | |
| Independent | Charles Frank Muncey | 417 | 12.24 | |
