= Olabarri =

Olabarri is a Spanish surname. Notable people with the surname include:

- José María Olabarri Massino (1849–1924), Basque businessman
- Juan Olabarri (1936–2018), Spanish sailor
- Koldo Olabarri (born 1992), Spanish film, theater, and television actor

== See also ==
- Ollávarre, village in the municipality of Álava, which in Basque is written as Olabarri
