= 1972 Star World Championship =

Event title
- Edition: 49th
- Host: Club Puerto Azul

Event details
- Venue: Naiguatá
- Yachts: Star
- Titles: 1

Competitors
- Competitors: 120
- Competing nations: 12

Results
- (gold) Gold: (West Germany) Kuhweide & Meyer
- (silver) Silver: (Brazil) Bruder & Biekarck
- (bronze) Bronze: (United States) Schoonmaker & Dudinsky

The 1972 Star World Championship was held at the Club Puerto Azul in Naiguatá, Venezuela in 1972.

== Results ==
Results of individual races
Pos	Boat name	Crew	Country	I	II	III	IV	V	VI	Pts
Gold medal	Sunny	Wilhelm Kuhweide; Karsten Meyer	West Germany	7	1	3	1	3	1	306
Silver medal	Buho Blanco	Jörg Bruder; Cláudio Biekarck	Brazil	3	3	4	4	2	3	300
Bronze medal	Dingo	Ding Schoonmaker; Thomas Dudinsky	United States	8	5	15	2	8	2	290
4	Humbug XII	Pelle Petterson; Ingvar Hansson	Sweden	5	15	1	12	4	5	288
5	Gem XI	Durward Knowles; Bill Buchan Jr.	Bahamas	4	4	5	9	5	19	288
6	Blott XIII	Stig Wennerström; Sture Christensson	Sweden	10	2	7	3	RET	8	285
7	Subbnboana	Eckart Wagner; Peter Möckl	West Germany	1	9	4	15	30	8	277
8	Cantact	John Albrechtson; Göran Tell	Sweden	6	16	14	8	1	9	277
9	Noni	António Correia; Antonio Rocha	Portugal	9	11	8	10	6	10	272
10	Something Else	Lowell North; Peter Barrett	United States	16	12	2	16	9	4	272
11	No Funcione	Uwe Mares; Kai Krüger	West Germany	12	6	31	14	11	6	266
12	Mirage	Flavio Scala; Mauro Testa	Italy	2	7	9	6	RET	26	265
13	Star of the Sea	Joseph R. Duplin; Frank Eggers	United States	14	24	16	5	13	11	256
14	Riot IV	Henry M. Rowan; Delmar R. Dhein	United States	17	27	10	13	7	16	252
15	Lucky Liz	Fritz Riess; Fritz Geis	West Germany	25	28	12	7	27	12	232
16	Ragamuffin	Larry Whipple; Karl Pollard	United States	20	8	21	24	34	13	229
17	Hannah	Barton S. Beek; Charles Beek	United States	23	10	17	21	RET	15	229
18	Impulse	John Buchan; Ron Farrell	United States	22	43	20	19	10	18	226
19	Caracas	Josef Steinmayer; Marcel Wunderli	Switzerland	18	30	13	20	20	20	224
20	Is Was	Hans Vogt Sr. Ludwig Buedel	West Germany	19	22	30	18	18	17	221
21	Fiamma	Oskar A. Meier; Daniel Wyss	Switzerland	11	35	19	11	39	23	216
22	Mahayana	Tryg Liljestrand; Dag Blidbäck	United States	13	19	11	30	33	30	212
23	Mumunha	Mario Innecco; Robinson Hasselman	Brazil	39	17	24	22	17	24	211
24	Hoya	Daniel Mullane; Robert Wester	United States	24	25	28	26	12	25	203
25	Nadia	Jurg Christen; Martin Buergi	Switzerland	32	13	29	33	14	29	198
26	Rampage	Steve Andrews; Peter Beam	United States	15	32	18	28	25	31	198
27	Bavaria	Stef Scheuregger; Karl-Heinz Burkert	West Germany	25	26	25	23	24	28	192
28	Twin	Ortwin Semmerow; Rolf Scholtz	West Germany	27	20	38	25	21	32	190
29	Happy End	August Weiss; Christian Breitenstein	Switzerland	26	18	32	41	15	45	183
30	Shrew VII	William Parks; Philip Botsolas	United States	46	34	26	31	29	14	181
31	Manita	Duarte de Almeida Bello; Manuel Espirito Santo	Portugal	48	21	47	32	16	21	178
32	Desiree	Angelo Marino; Luigi Saidelli	Italy	29	14	22	17	DNS	DNS	170
33	Playmate	Sonke Breckwoldt; Walter Rausch	Venezuela	43	50	33	29	19	37	154
34	Blue Chip III	David Gaillard; Jack Levedahl	United States	21	42	37	34	28	RET	153
35	Shamrock	Russell Bogie; Rick Alexanderson	United States	45	RET	42	35	23	22	148
36	Spankuk	Chresten Jensen; Harald Jensen	United States	35	23	57	27	48	36	146
37	Whitecap	Roger Doane; David Doane	United States	33	56	27	48	26	46	135
38	Griffin	Dexter Richards; Chris Alex	United States	RET	46	35	37	35	33	129
39	Demon V	Kenneth Cole; Thomas McCook	United States	40	39	23	44	42	43	128
40	Zwidawurzn	Albert Sporer; Hans Prechter	West Germany	28	37	48	45	46	34	125
41	Zaperoco	Thomas D. Drew-Bear; John R. Drew-Bear	Venezuela	30	29	45	42	49	52	120
42	Sylke	Manfred Meyer; Karl-Heinz Bald	West Germany	36	40	39	46	41	47	113
43	Der Otto	H. Mitterhauser; Juerg Oborkofler	Austria	49	33	41	49	31	51	112
44	Eljopeja	Hans J. Ruedel; Peter Moeller	West Germany	31	54	46	43	45	39	111
45	Virgin Star	Ken Klein Sr. Robert Thompson	U.S. Virgin Islands	41	41	40	40	47	42	111
46	Fury	Kenneth Morton; Barbara Morton	United States	42	36	44	39	44	50	110
47	Cutty Sark	Peter Metzner; Alex Dumont	Brazil	47	31	DNS	DNS	38	27	109
48	Lausbub IV	Martin Schwieger; Nico Jurgensen	West Germany	56	48	34	36	50	38	109
49	Tucana VIII	Dierk Thomsen; Henner Liebenberg	West Germany	44	52	43	47	37	40	104
50	Titila	Roberto Mieres; Raul Perrachione	Argentina	37	55	49	38	DNS	35	101
51	Espuma del Mar	Daniel Camejo; Juan Feld	Venezuela	53	38	55	52	32	41	99
52	Debbie	Philip Pines; Pual Colinai	United States	51	49	52	50	22	49	94
53	Flipper III	Joseph Roberts Jr. Joseph Roberts Sr.	United States	55	53	36	RET	51	44	76
54	Hang Ten	Greg Smith; Barry Hess	United States	50	51	54	53	40	DNS	67
55	Fearless Fred	Freddy Schiavo; Peter Ganterbein	Switzerland	52	45	50	54	RET	48	66
56	En Garde	Gordon Young; Fritz Maiweg	Venezuela	57	47	56	51	43	RET	61
57	Zwentebold	Hugo Schott; Cyril Dvorak	West Germany	54	57	53	55	36	RET	60
58	Playboy	Karsten Boysen; Helmut Flegel	Venezuela	34	44	51	RET	DNS	DNS	60
59	Trece	Thomas D. Drew-Bear; Irwin Hest	Venezuela	RET	DNS	DNS	56	52	DNS	18
60	Chubasco	Rocco Campanelli; Frank Geronimo	United States	RET	DNS	DNS	DNS	DNS	DNS	0

Legend: DNS – Did not start; RET – Retired;
