= Nzo =

Nzo or NZO may refer to:

- nZo, an American rapper and professional wrestler formerly known as Enzo Amore
- Nzo Ekangaki (1934–2005), a Cameroonian political figure
- New Zealand Opera, a professional opera company
- New Zionist Organization, Revisionist Zionist political organization founded by Ze'ev Jabotinsky
- NZO objects, in Ward doubles
- Nondiabetic Zealand Obese, a kind of mouse strain involved in experimentation in Metabolomics/Metabolites/Lipids

== See also ==
- N'Zoo, a town and sub-prefecture in the Lola Prefecture in the Nzérékoré Region of south-eastern Guinea
