= Saffery (disambiguation) =

Saffery is a firm of chartered accountants in the UK.

Saffery may also refer to:

== People ==
- Brian Saffery-Cooper – a British sailor
- Deon Saffery – a squash player
- John Hugh Saffery – RAF officer during WW II
- Maria Grace Saffery – a poet from England

== Places ==
- Saffery Islands in Antarctica
