= Hans Vogt =

Hans Vogt may refer to:

- Hans Vogt (engineer) (1890–1979), German engineer and one of the inventors of the Tri-Ergon sound-on-film technology
- Hans Vogt (linguist) (1903–1986), Norwegian linguist
- Hans Vogt (composer) (1911–1992), German composer and conductor
- Hans Vogt, Sr., German sailor in 1972 Star World Championships
- Hans Vogt, Jr., German sailor
