= Gérard Devillard =

French sailor

Personal information
- Nationality: French
- Born: 5 February 1940 (age 85)

Sport
- Sport: Sailing

Gérard Devillard (born 5 February 1940) is a French sailor. He competed in the Finn event at the 1964 Summer Olympics.
