= Jan Winquist =

Finnish sailor

Personal information
- Nationality: Finnish
- Born: 30 May 1939 (age 85); Helsinki, Finland

Sport
- Sport: Sailing

Jan Winquist (born 30 May 1939) is a Finnish sailor. He competed in the Finn event at the 1968 Summer Olympics.
