= Carlos Ruiz (sailor) =

Salvadoran sailor

Personal information
- Born: 6 October 1940 (age 85) San Salvador, El Salvador

Sport
- Sport: Sailing

Carlos Ruiz (born 6 October 1940) is a Salvadoran sailor. He competed in the Finn event at the 1968 Summer Olympics.
