= Haluk Kakış =

Turkish sailor (1932–2020)

Personal information
- Nationality: Turkish
- Born: 25 January 1932; Trabzon, Turkey
- Died: 23 November 2020 (aged 88)

Sport
- Sport: Sailing

Haluk Kakış (25 January 1932 – 23 November 2020) was a Turkish sailor. He competed in the Finn event at the 1964 Summer Olympics.
