= Alberto Obarrio =

Argentine sailor

Personal information
- Full name: Ángel Alberto Obarrio
- Born: 3 March 1944 (age 81); Buenos Aires, Argentina
- Height: 178 cm (5 ft 10 in)
- Weight: 74 kg (163 lb)

Sailing career
- Class: Finn

Alberto Obarrio (born 3 March 1944) is an Argentine sailor. He competed in the Finn event at the 1968 Summer Olympics.
