= Manuel Villareal (Filipino sailor) =

Filipino sailor

Personal information
- Nationality: Filipino

Sport
- Sport: Sailing

Manuel Villareal is a Filipino sailor. He competed in the Finn event at the 1968 Summer Olympics.
