= Ronald Jenyns =

Australian sailor

Ronald Graeme Jenyns (25 February 1936 – 5 November 2024) was an Australian Olympic sailor. He competed in the Finn class at the 1960 and 1968 Summer Olympic games, finishing in fourth position both times.

He later worked in the game fishing industry in northern Queensland.
