= Hans Willems =

Dutch sailor (born 1934)

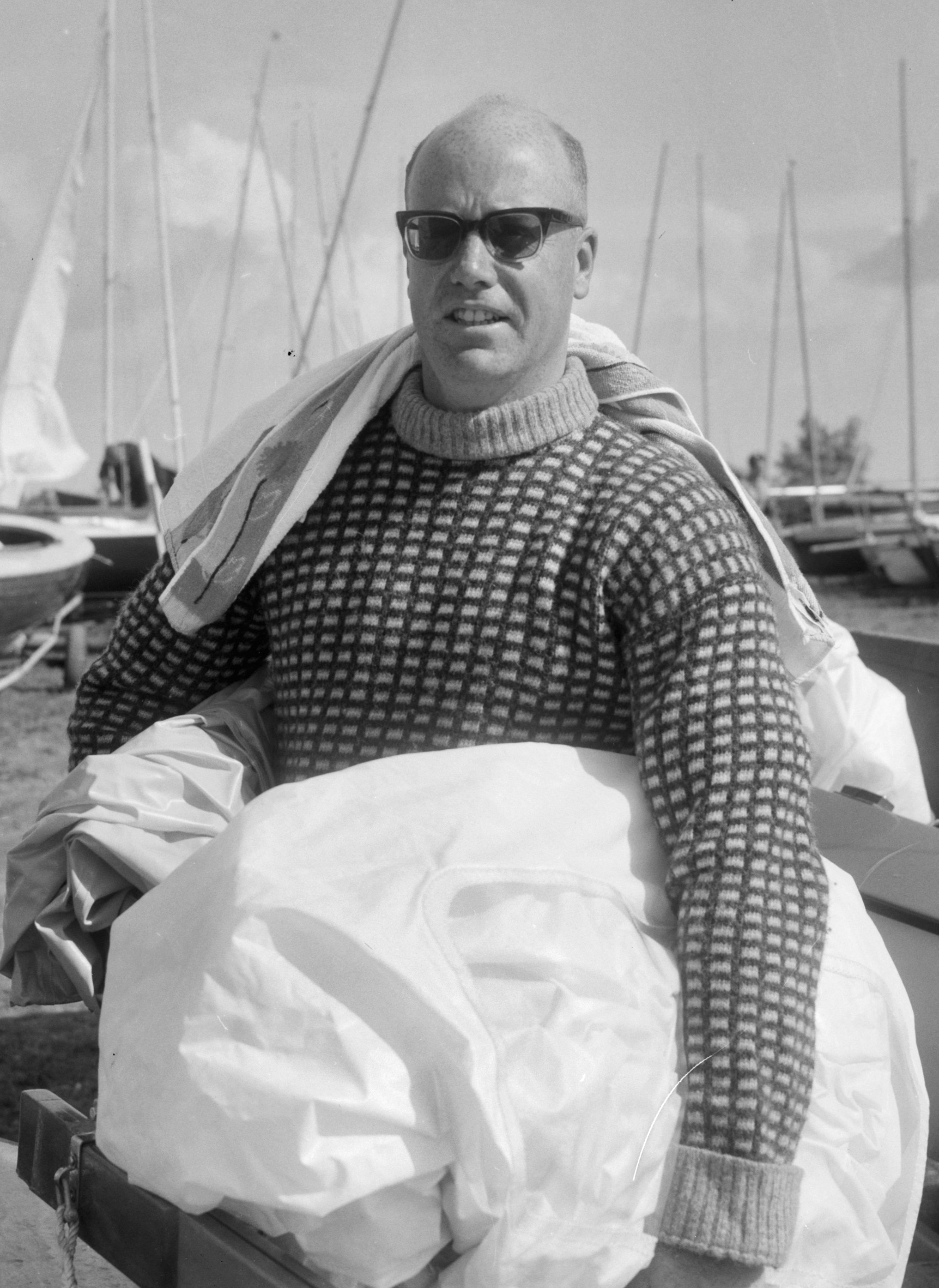
- Hans Willems in 1964

Personal information
- Full name: Hans Willems
- Nationality: Dutch
- Born: 22 March 1934 Amsterdam, the Netherlands
- Height: 1.72 m (5 ft 8 in)
- Weight: 80 kg (180 lb)

Sport

Sailing career
- Class: Finn

Hans Willems (born 22 March 1934, date of death unknown) was a Dutch sailor. He competed in the Finn class at the 1964 Summer Olympics and finished in 16th place. Willems is deceased.

== Sources ==
- "Hans Willems Bio, Stats, and Results". Olympic Sports. Sports-Reference.com. Archived from the original on 18 April 2020.
- "Zeilploeg voor Tokio bekend" (in Dutch). Het vrĳe volk : democratisch-socialistisch dagblad. 9 May 1964.
- "Kunde" (in Dutch) (Day ed.). De Telegraaf. 21 September 1964.
- "The Games of the XVIII Olympiad Tokio 1964, The Official Report of the Organizing Committee Volume One Part One" (PDF). 1964. Archived from the original (PDF) on 6 May 2010.
- "The Games of the XVIII Olympiad Tokio 1964, The Official Report of the Organizing Committee Volume One Part Two" (PDF). 1964. Archived from the original (PDF) on 18 November 2008.
- "The Games of the XVIII Olympiad Tokio 1964, The Official Report of the Organizing Committee Volume Two Part One" (PDF). 1964. Archived from the original (PDF) on 26 February 2008.
- "The Games of the XVIII Olympiad Tokio 1964, The Official Report of the Organizing Committee Volume Two Part Two" (PDF). 1964. Archived from the original (PDF) on 26 January 2009.
