= Ward Observatory =

Astronomical observatory in Whanganui, New Zealand

Coordinates: 39.933086°S 175.049112°E

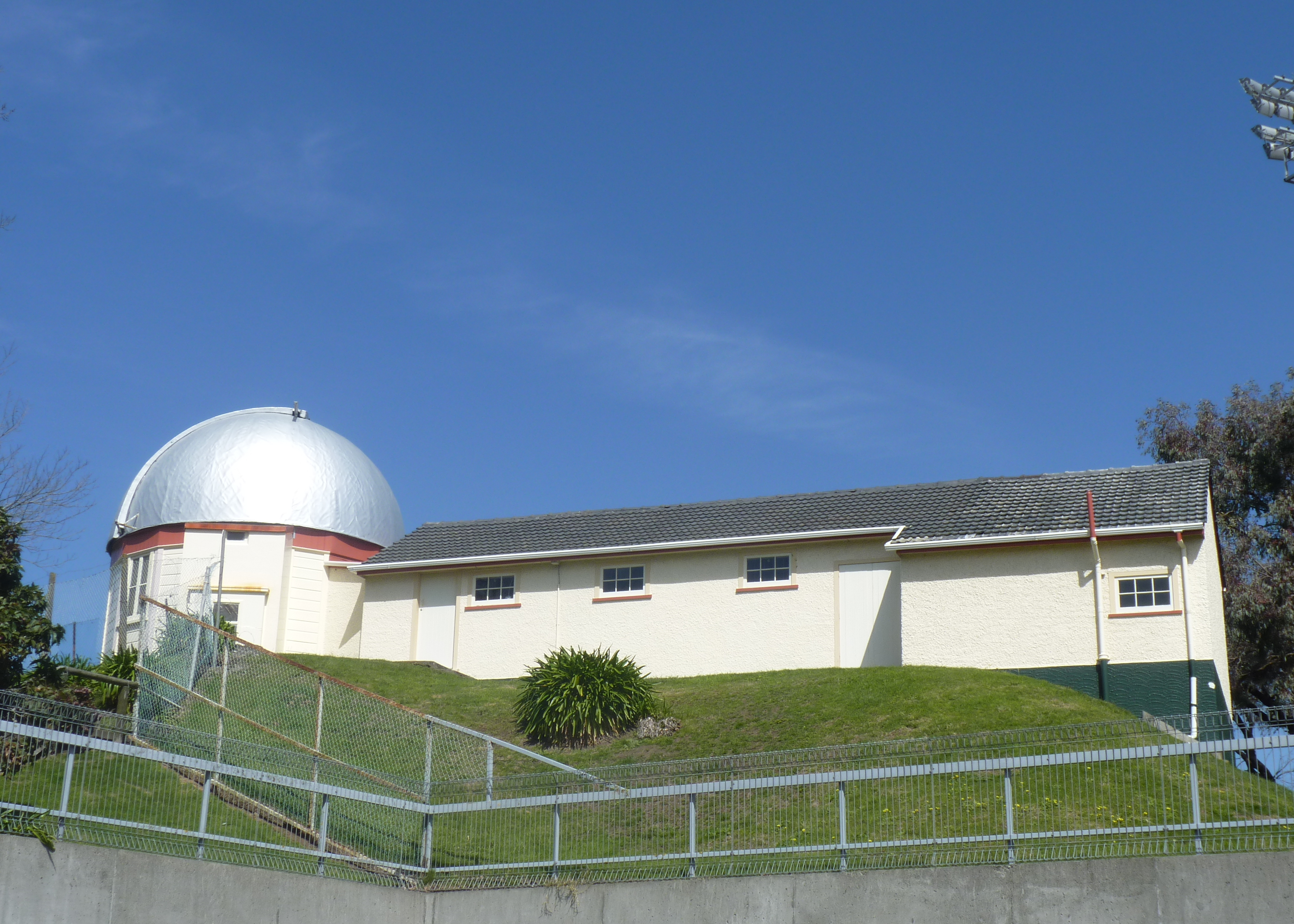
Ward Observatory

The Ward Observatory is an astronomical observatory in Whanganui, New Zealand. Built in 1901 and administered by the Wanganui Astronomical Society, it is named after Joseph Ward (1862–1927), the society's first president and longtime director of the observatory. It houses a 9 1/2 inches (24 cm) telescope, the largest unmodified refractor telescope in use in New Zealand.

The Observatory was designed by A. Atkins to Joseph Ward's specifications, cost £290 to build, and was formally opened by Premier Richard Seddon on 25 May 1903. The telescope had been bought second-hand in England for £450, and with its mounting weighed three tons.

In the Astronomical Society's heyday before and during World War I, Joseph Ward was Honorary Director of the Observatory and Charles Whitmore Babbage, grandson of Charles Babbage the President, Secretary, and Treasurer. At this time Ward and his assistant Thomas Allison catalogued over 200 double stars, 88 of which are still recognised as “Ward doubles”. Ward also ran public viewing nights at the observatory twice a week.

In 1926 the observatory was gifted by the Astronomical Society to the Wanganui City Council, debt free. After Joseph Ward's death, his son William Herschel Ward was honorary director of the observatory from 1927 to 1959. Since 1984 the Ward Observatory and its telescope have had a Heritage New Zealand Category I rating.

Located in Cooks Gardens, access to the observatory is from St Hill Street. Public viewing is on Friday evenings after dark, or by arrangement with the Astronomical Society. School groups can attend by appointment.
