= Alex Bally =

Swiss sailor

Personal information
- Nationality: Swiss
- Born: 25 February 1942 (age 83); Tehran, Iran

Sport
- Sport: Sailing

Alex Bally (born 25 February 1942) is a Swiss sailor. He competed in the Finn event at the 1968 Summer Olympics.
