= Andrzej Zawieja =

Polish sailor

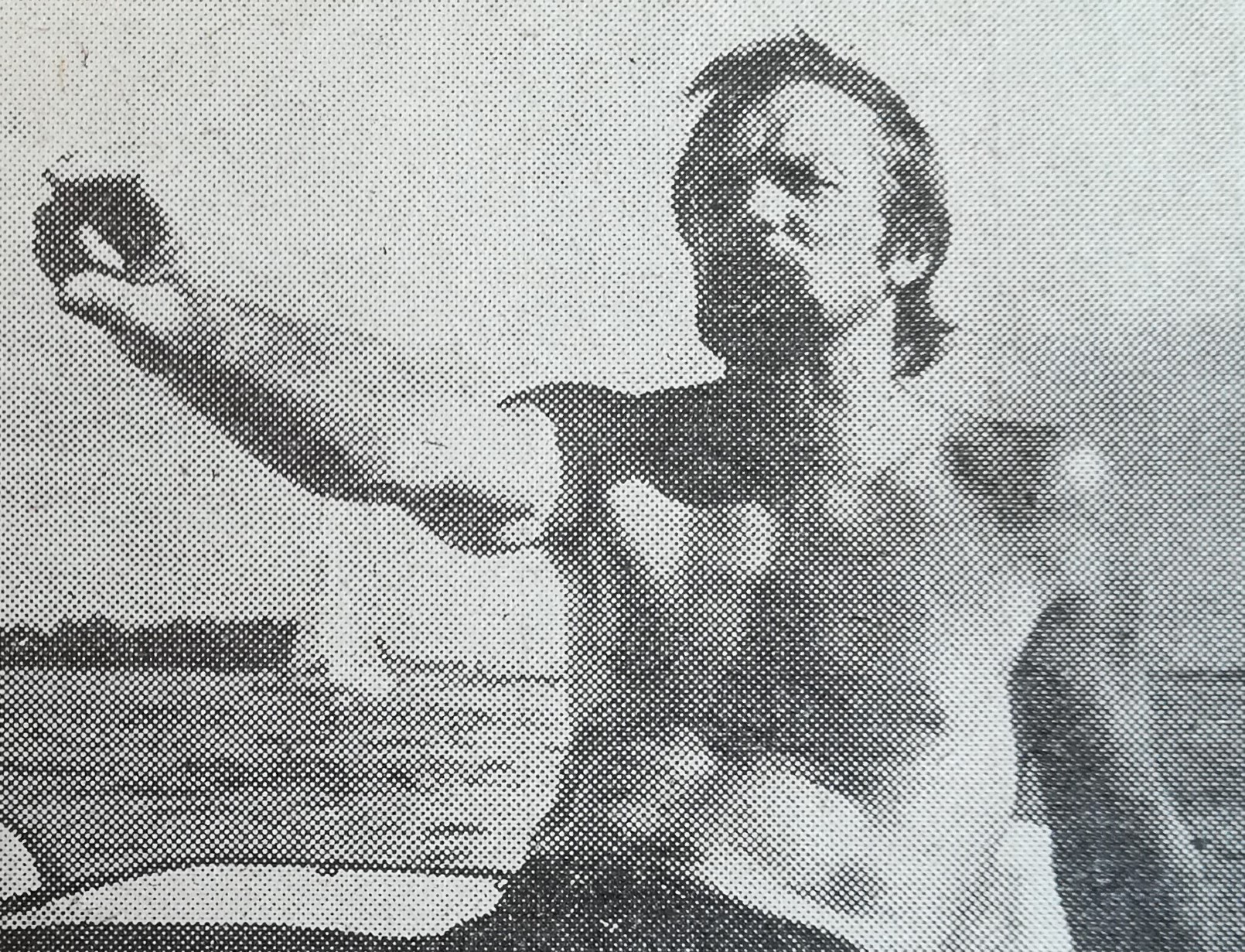
- Andrzej Zawieja in 1940.

Personal information
- Nationality: Polish
- Born: 5 July 1940 (age 84); Kalisz, Poland

Sport
- Sport: Sailing

Andrzej Zawieja (born 5 July 1940) is a Polish sailor. He competed in the Finn event at the 1968 Summer Olympics.
