= Robert Lucas (sailor) =

Indonesian sailor

Personal information
- Nationality: Indonesian
- Born: 29 September 1932 (age 92); Jakarta, Indonesia

Sport
- Sport: Sailing

Robert Lucas (born 29 September 1932) is an Indonesian sailor. He competed in the Finn event at the 1968 Summer Olympics.
