= Juan Ignacio Sirvent =

Spanish sailor

Personal information
- Nationality: Spanish
- Born: 1946 (age 78–79); Barcelona, Spain

Sport
- Sport: Sailing

Juan Ignacio Sirvent (born 1946) is a Spanish sailor. He competed in the Finn event at the 1968 Summer Olympics.
