= List of by-elections to the Porirua City Council =

By-elections to the Porirua City Council occur to fill vacant seats in the council. The death, resignation, bankruptcy or expulsion of a sitting Councillor can cause a by-election to occur.

== Summary ==
The following is a list of by-elections held to fill vacancies on the Porirua City Council:

Key

Independent	Labour	Values	Independent Progressive

Ward	Date	Incumbent	Cause	Winner
At-large	11 March 1973	Tutuira Wi Neera	Death	Helen Smith
Taupo	24 May 1975	Fred Duckworth	Death	Jan Bennett
Porirua	4 December 1976	Gary McCormick	Resignation	Rex Willing
Cannons Creek	18 June 1985	Bill Herewini	Death	Margaret Brown
Cannons Creek	21 August 1985	Hec Stuart	Death	Geoff Walpole
Onepoto	16 October 2026	Mike Duncan	Death	Jo Dow
Parirua Māori	3 March 2027	Kylie Wihapi	Death	TBD

== List of by-elections ==
=== 1973 by-election ===
1973 Porirua City Council by-election
Party	Candidate	Votes	%	±%
Values	Helen Smith	563	34.73	
Labour	Terry O'Brien	386	23.81	−18.90
Ind. Progressive	Jim Slader	269	16.59	−19.14
Independent	Ken Arthur	194	11.96	
Independent Labour	Frank McIlwee	103	6.35	−36.31
Independent	Maxine Arnold	73	4.50	
Independent	Terence Lewis Lloyd	28	1.72	−18.77
Informal votes		5	0.30	
Majority		177	10.91	
Turnout		1,621		

=== 1975 by-election ===
1975 Porirua City Council by-election, Taupo ward
Party	Candidate	Votes	%	±%
Independent	Jan Bennett	905	55.76	
Independent	Alexander Grant	710	43.74	
Informal votes		8	0.49	
Majority		195	12.01	
Turnout		1,623	52.35	

=== 1976 by-election ===
1976 Porirua City Council by-election, Porirua ward
Party	Candidate	Votes	%	±%
Labour	Rex Willing	1,830	41.31	
Independent	Alf Mexted	827	18.67	−24.46
Ind. Progressive	Philip Ward	636	14.35	−25.29
Independent	Estelle Brittain	609	13.75	
Independent	Sylvia Cole	496	11.19	
Informal votes		31	0.69	
Majority		1,003	22.64	
Turnout		4,429		

=== June 1985 by-election ===
1985 Porirua City Council by-election, Cannons Creek ward
Party	Candidate	Votes	%	±%
Labour	Margaret Brown	1,776	70.92	
Independent	Alfred Potaka	490	19.56	
Independent	Popo Su'a	238	9.50	
Majority		1,286	51.35	
Turnout		2,504		

=== August 1985 by-election ===
1985 Porirua City Council by-election, Cannons Creek ward
Party	Candidate	Votes	%	±%
Labour	Geoff Walpole	1,448	64.38	
Independent	Melville Williams	550	24.45	
Independent	Sonny Hoskins	251	11.16	
Majority		898	39.92	
Turnout		2,249		

=== 2026 by-election, Onepoto general ward ===
In June 2026, Onepoto councillor Mike Duncan died after having served on the council since 2016. His death triggered a by-election, which was held on 16 October 2026.

Candidate	Affiliation	Notes
Joanne Dow	None	Daughter of former six-term councillor Sue Dow
Caroline Mareko	None	Sāmoan educator and community services leader
Zac Painting	Green	Ran in the 2025 local elections
Siobhan Samuel	None	Ran in the 2025 local elections
Jess Te Huia	None	Korowai Service Manager at the Porirua Whānau Centre charity, which also employs councillors Hemi Fermanis and Kathleen Filo. Ran in the Onepoto ward in the 2022 local elections and in the Parirua Māori ward in the 2025 local elections.

With the release of the final results, Jo Dow was declared elected. She was sworn in on 29 October.

Preliminary results
Party	Candidate	Primary votes	%	±%	Iteration	
Party	Candidate	Primary votes	%	±%	#	Votes
Independent	Jo Dow	1,895	38.09	(new)	4th	2,545
Independent	Caroline Mareko	1,328	26.69	(new)	4th	1,778
Independent	Jess Te Huia	712	14.31	(new)	3rd	942
Green	Zac Painting	659	13.25	+8.88	2nd	696
Independent	Siobhan Samuel	346	6.95	+4.62	1st	346
Quota		2,470	49.65			
Informal votes		29	0.58	–0.36		
Blank votes		6	0.12	–1.30		
Turnout		4,975	23.56	–13.04		
Registered electors		~21,116				
Independent gain from Independent on 4th iteration						

=== 2027 by-election, Parirua Māori ward ===
In October 2026, deputy mayor and Parirua Māori ward councillor Kylie Wihapi died after having served on the council since 2016. A by-election will be held in the Parirua Māori ward between 30 January and 3 March 2027 to fill the vacancy left by her death.
