= Touch Kim Sy =

Cambodian sailor

Personal information
- Nationality: Cambodian
- Born: 13 August 1940 (age 84)

Sport
- Sport: Sailing

Touch Kim Sy (born 13 August 1940) is a Cambodian sailor. He competed in the Finn event at the 1964 Summer Olympics.
