= Onepoto, Wellington =

Suburb of Porirua

Coordinates: 41.1139°S 174.8481°E

Onepoto
- Suburb
- Interactive map of Onepoto
- Country: New Zealand
- City: Porirua City
- Local authority: Porirua City Council
- Electoral ward: Onepoto General Ward; Porirua Māori Ward

Area
  - Land: 224 ha (550 acres)

Population (June 2025)
  - Total: 1,980
  - Density: 884/km^{2} (2,290/sq mi)

	Whitireia Park
Tītahi Bay	Onepoto	(Porirua Harbour)
	Takapūwāhia

Onepoto is a locality of Porirua City in New Zealand. It is bounded to the north by Whitireia Park, a large park which is slowly being returned to native bush, and to the east by the Porirua Harbour.

Onepoto covers a land area of 2.24 km², including an area of coast.

The New Zealand Ministry for Culture and Heritage translates Onepoto as "short beach".

== Demography ==
Onepoto statistical area covers 2.24 km^{2} (0.86 sq mi). It had an estimated population of 1,980 as of June 2025, with a population density of 883.93 people per km^{2}.

Historical population
Year	Pop.	±% p.a.
2006	1,845	—
2013	1,800	−0.35%
2018	1,917	+1.27%
2023	1,938	+0.22%

Onepoto had a population of 1,938 in the 2023 New Zealand census, an increase of 21 people (1.1%) since the 2018 census, and an increase of 138 people (7.7%) since the 2013 census. There were 954 males, 981 females, and 3 people of other genders in 633 dwellings. 4.0% of people identified as LGBTIQ+. The median age was 35.1 years (compared with 38.1 years nationally). There were 429 people (22.1%) aged under 15 years, 381 (19.7%) aged 15 to 29, 894 (46.1%) aged 30 to 64, and 234 (12.1%) aged 65 or older.

People could identify as more than one ethnicity. The results were 70.0% European (Pākehā); 33.4% Māori; 18.7% Pasifika; 6.5% Asian; 1.5% Middle Eastern, Latin American and African New Zealanders (MELAA); and 3.4% other, which includes people giving their ethnicity as "New Zealander". English was spoken by 96.7%, Māori by 9.0%, Samoan by 4.2%, and other languages by 9.1%. No language could be spoken by 2.6% (e.g. too young to talk). New Zealand Sign Language was known by 0.6%. The percentage of people born overseas was 17.6, compared with 28.8% nationally.

Religious affiliations were 31.0% Christian, 0.5% Hindu, 0.8% Islam, 2.2% Māori religious beliefs, 0.5% Buddhist, 0.2% New Age, 0.3% Jewish, and 1.4% other religions. People who answered that they had no religion were 56.0%, and 7.4% of people did not answer the census question.

Of those at least 15 years old, 363 (24.1%) people had a bachelor's or higher degree, 852 (56.5%) had a post-high school certificate or diploma, and 294 (19.5%) people exclusively held high school qualifications. The median income was $49,500, compared with $41,500 nationally. 207 people (13.7%) earned over $100,000 compared to 12.1% nationally. The employment status of those at least 15 was 873 (57.9%) full-time, 192 (12.7%) part-time, and 45 (3.0%) unemployed.

== Economy ==
In 2018, 11.9% of the workforce worked in healthcare, 11.3% worked in construction, 10.7% worked in education, 4.5% worked in manufacturing, 4.5% worked in transport and 3.9% worked in hospitality.

== Transportation ==
As of 2018, among those who commute to work, 70.9% drove a car, 4.7% rode in a car, 0.9% used a bike, and 0.9% walked or ran. No one used public transport.
