= Fernando Thode =

Uruguayan sailor

Personal information
- Born: 25 June 1950 (age 75) Montevideo, Uruguay

Sport
- Sport: Sailing

Fernando Thode (born 25 June 1950) is a Uruguayan sailor. He competed in the Finn event at the 1968 Summer Olympics. He also won a bronze medal in the Snipe event at the 1983 Pan American Games.
