= Michael McFadden (sailor) =

Rhodesian sailor (born 1936)

Personal information
- Nationality: Rhodesian
- Born: 14 May 1936 (age 88)

Sport
- Sport: Sailing

Michael McFadden (born 14 May 1936) is a Rhodesian sailor. He competed in the Finn event at the 1964 Summer Olympics.
