= Rex Willing =

New Zealand public servant (1923–2000)

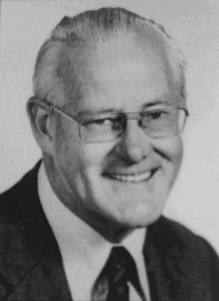

Private Secretary to the Prime Minister of New Zealand
- In office 8 December 1972 – 31 August 1974
- Prime Minister: Norman Kirk

Personal details
- Born: 25 March 1923 New Zealand
- Died: 23 September 2000 (aged 77) Kenepuru, New Zealand
- Party: Labour Party (until 1977)
- Spouse: Marie Frisk (m. 1947)
- Children: 4
- Profession: Public servant

Rex John Willing (25 March 1923 – 23 September 2000) was a New Zealand public servant and politician who was the private secretary to Prime Minister Norman Kirk.

== Biography ==
=== Early life and career ===
Willing was born in 1923 to Thomas Elwin and Alice Mona Willing. In 1947 he married Marie Frisk and lived together in Elsdon, north of Wellington. He worked in the public service successively for the Department of Statistics, Department of Industries and Commerce and Consumers Institute.

=== Political career ===
In 1966, Willing became assistant secretary to Norman Kirk, who was then the Leader of the Opposition. He worked under Malcolm McNamara, who was Kirk's private secretary. At the time the Leader of the Opposition had no research office, so Willing started a makeshift one with Margaret Hayward that served the entire parliamentary caucus and a personal research system for Kirk. A formal research office was later established in 1971. McNamara was a different personality to Kirk as an academic and active Christian, both traits which Kirk mistrusted. Willing was more working class and the two got along well personally. When McNamara tendered his resignation (which he assumed would not be accepted) Kirk made no hesitation in promoting Willing to replace him.

At the 1968 local-body elections, Willing was elected a member of the Porirua City Council on the Labour Party ticket. He served as a councillor until 1974 when he did not seek re-election.

In the 1969 election, Willing and Margaret Hayward served as speech writers for Kirk and ensured he had a more consistent policy message than previous elections which contributed to a rise in support. During the 1972 election campaign Willing went through the National Party's estimates of Labour's election pledges and found them to be exaggerated, with inflated figures in National's costing estimates. This became an attack line against National in Labour's campaign. Unsure if he would retain a job working for Kirk after Labour won the 1972 election (staff for the parliamentary opposition were employed by the Legislative Department not the Labour Party), Willing planned to transfer to the Department of Trade & Industry. However Kirk made arrangements to have him employed in the office of the Prime Minister. He later shared an office with Hayward at the beehive from 1972 to 1974. He travelled with Kirk on the road when he attended events and conferences, taping speeches and then typing up transcripts of them for publication. This included accompanying Kirk on his overseas trip to Asia and Australia in December 1973 and January 1974. Whilst in Singapore He and Kirk went swimming in a luxury swimming pool at the Shangri-La Hotel where he almost drowned and had to be rescued by Kirk. He worked close enough with Kirk to notice the strained relations he had with his wife Ruth, particularly after the 1972 election.

When Kirk died in 1974, the finance minister Bill Rowling replaced him as prime minister. Rowling reorganised the prime minister's office staff and did not retain Willing as personal secretary. For the next month Willing was kept on however to assist Ruth Kirk with her affairs and correspondence. He then shifted to work as a private secretary for Hugh Watt, the Minister of Works and Development, until 1975. Willing stood for election to the New Zealand House of Representatives for the Labour Party in the Manawatu seat of Ruahine at the 1975 election finishing runner-up. After the election, he gained employment at the Department of Statistics.

In 1976, he made a return to local-body politics when he won a by-election for the Porirua City Council to replace Gary McCormick who had resigned. In 1977 he stood for Mayor of Porirua as well as the city council as an independent candidate. He was unsuccessful in both elections. For standing as an independent against the official Labour ticket he was expelled from the party. In 1980 he was elected for a third spell as a Porirua City Councillor. Once on the council again, he voted in favour of a motion to refer the controversial appointment of former Lower Hutt deputy mayor John Seddon as Porirua's Town Clerk to the Office of the Ombudsman. After one term, he was defeated when standing for re-election in 1983. For six years he was also a member of the Porirua Licensing Trust (1977–80, 1983–86).

=== Later life and death ===
His wife, Marie, died in 1992 and Willing moved from Elsdon to Tītahi Bay in 1994. He died at Kenepuru Hospital on 23 September 2000, aged 77. He was survived by his three sons and one daughter.
