= Per Dohm =

United States Virgin Islands sailor

Personal information
- Full name: Per Alton Dohm
- Nationality: American Virgin Islander
- Born: May 14, 1938; Miami, Florida, United States
- Died: July 7, 2005 (aged 67); Red Hook, United States Virgin Islands

Sport
- Sport: Sailing

Per Alton Dohm (May 14, 1938 – July 7, 2005) was a sailor who represented the United States Virgin Islands. He competed in the Finn event at the 1968 Summer Olympics.

Born into a sailing family, he ran a water taxi business in St. Thomas and was also the coach of the USVI sailing team. He coached Peter Holmberg to a silver medal in the 1988 Summer Olympics in the Finn event.
