= Ward double =

Binary star

A Ward double is one of 88 binary stars recognized by the Washington Double Star Catalog (as NZO objects) that were identified by Joseph Ward and his assistant Thomas Allison. Ward and Allison identified over 200 double stars during a survey of the southern sky at Ward Observatory over six years beginning in 1904.
