= György Fináczy =

Hungarian sailor

Personal information
- Nationality: Hungarian
- Born: 25 May 1942 (age 84) Budapest, Hungary

Sport
- Sport: Sailing

György Fináczy (born 25 May 1942) is a Hungarian sailor. He competed at the 1964 Summer Olympics and the 1972 Summer Olympics.
