= Joseph Ward (astronomer) =

New Zealand astronomer (1862–1927)

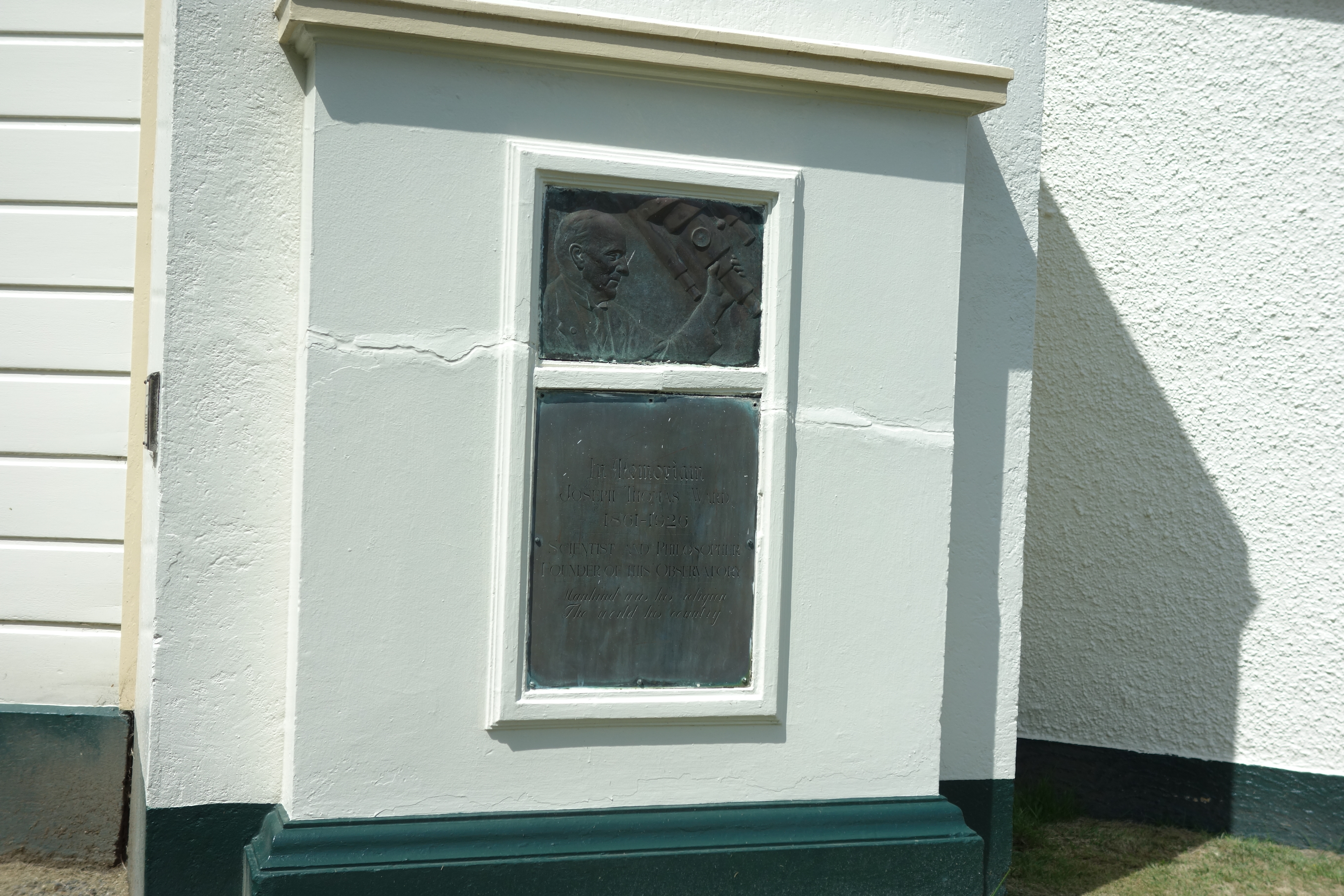
- "Embossed brass plates, Ward Observatory, a memorial to Joseph Thomas Ward"
- Born: Joseph Thomas Ward; 25 January 1862; Chelsea, London, England
- Died: 4 January 1927 (aged 64); Wairoa, New Zealand
- Known for: Ward Doubles, Ward Observatory
- Spouse: Ada Evelyn Wright
- Children: 7
- Scientific career
- Fields: astronomy, philosophy, science education
- Workplaces: Ward Observatory

Joseph Thomas Ward (25 January 1862 – 4 January 1927) was a New Zealand astronomer and telescope maker. Born in England, he migrated to New Zealand circa 1880, and settled in Whanganui. Ward was a pioneer New Zealand telescope maker, instrumental in establishing both the Wanganui Astronomical Society, and the Wanganui Observatory.

== Early life ==
Joseph Thomas Ward was born in Chelsea, London, England, on 25 January 1862, the son of Mary Sarah Clark and Francis Ward, a licensed victualler. He was educated for the Catholic priesthood but abandoned this idea and migrated to New Zealand, where he worked for several years as a shepherd and shearer in Marlborough, and as a saddler in Wellington. On 12 October 1894, he married Ada Evelyn Wright (at the residence of the bride’s father). The married couple moved to Whanganui, where Ward first opened a lending library, and later, a bookshop and stationery business, ‘Book Nook’.

== Wanganui Astronomical Society and Wanganui Observatory ==
In April 1901, a brilliant comet appeared in the New Zealand evening skies.

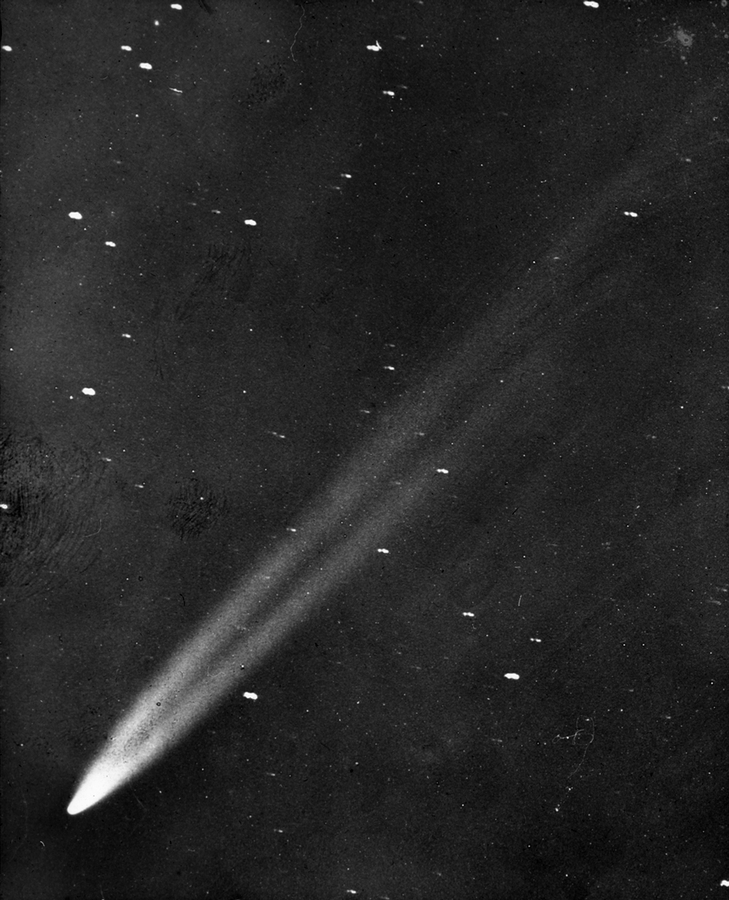
The Great Comet of 1901 was observed by Ward with a telescope he'd installed in his own business premises.

Ward had installed a 4½ inch equatorially mounted refractor in a small observatory at the back of his business premises, and from the report in the Wanganui Herald of 3 May, it would appear that this was the first view Wanganui residents had of the Great Comet of 1901. The number of people who came to view the comet through this telescope, gave Ward the idea of forming a small society of interested persons.

A few week's later, Prof. Richard Maclaurin of the then Victoria College gave a lecture on Comets at the Wanganui Museum Hall. He suggested at Ward's request, that anyone who was interested in forming an Astronomical Society, remain behind after the talk. The first meeting was held at the Wanganui Technical School on the corner of the Avenue and Guyton street, and at the following meeting, the Wanganui Astronomical Society was formed, with Joseph Ward elected president.

One of the first decisions of the new society was that a telescope of fairly large dimensions be obtained and an observatory be established. Ward led a deputation to the Wanganui Borough Council requesting a site at Cook's Gardens; the council granted this at their meeting of 27 August 1901.

After careful research by Ward, the Wanganui Astronomical Society decided in November 1901, to order a 20½-in Calver Reflector, from the English Firm, Banks & Co. The full cost of this telescope was to be £450, and a partial payment of £400 had already been despatched to England when a cable arrived to cancel the sale – it had apparently been agreed to without the agreement of Mr Chatwood, the current owner. Conveniently, Chatwood also had a 9½-in Cooke refractor, which was originally owned by Isaac Fletcher and it was this instrument that he offered to the Society for the £400 already received.

The telescope, according to Chatwood, was worth far in excess of the 20½-in Calver Reflector, and although the purchase price grew to £450 after the request for some improvements and additional equipment, the Society had "got itself a bargain". At their 2 May 1902 meeting, the Wanganui Astronomical Society voted to accept the offer, and the telescope was duly dismantled and shipped to New Zealand on the S. S. Indravedi.

The 9½-in refractor was installed in the newly constructed Wanganui Observatory, which was officially opened by Premier Richard Seddon on 25 May 1903. The telescope is still the largest unmodified telescope of its type in the North Island of New Zealand.

In the Astronomical Society’s heyday, Joseph Ward was Honorary Director of the Observatory. With his assistant, Thomas Allison, he catalogued over 200 double stars, 88 of which are still recognised as 'Ward doubles'. In 1926 the astronomical society gifted the observatory, debt free, to the Wanganui City Council in trust for the citizens of Wanganui. It is now known as the Ward Observatory.

== Astronomical Educator and Telescope maker ==
In the 20 June 1918 edition of the Wanganui Herald, Ward reported on a new star, 'Nova Aquilae', which he and his observatory assistant, Thomas Allison, had observed on the evening of 10 June. It had been observed in England and on the Continent of Europe on the evening of the 9th. Ward expressed regret that they had not a star spectroscope of adequate power with which to bring out the star's spectrum, but nonetheless was able to provide a detailed description.

In 1919, an American solar authority, Professor Albert F. Porta, was quoted in a San Francisco newspaper as predicting terrible storms due to a great sunspot. Ward’s opinion was duly sought, and his response was that there was "No need to lose sleep". Ward also said,

The name of Professor Albert F. Porta is one with which I am not familiar. I receive the reports of the Mt. Wilson Solar Observatory, as well as those of the Lick Observatory and some others, but do not remember Professor Porta’s name appearing in any of their transactions, so cannot say if he speaks with any authority. If Dr. Hale, of Mt. Wilson, or Dr. Campbell, of Lick, said these things I would begin to think we were in for a warm time, but they do not say these things, for very good reasons well known to them – and some others.

Ward responded point by point to Professor Porta’s predictions, finishing with the statement,

When Prof. Porta says that "The whole solar system will be strangely out of balance" and that "storms, eruptions, and earthquakes will be tremendous in the strength and scope" on the 17th December next, he is dealing in hot air, and, I can assure your readers that they have no cause for alarm, and need lose no sleep over these direful predictions.

Through his lectures, his public open nights at the observatory and his weekly column in The Wanganui Herald, Ward made astronomy accessible to the general public. He frequently gave talks to the Wanganui Philosophical Society, of which he held the position of vice president and in September 1926, he delivered the Thomas Cawthron Memorial Lecture on the topic of 'the wonders of the universe'. The previous year’s speaker had been Sir Ernest Rutherford. Ward was also a pioneer New Zealand telescope maker, and the 20-inch refractor telescope he installed in his own home was recognised in 1927, as the best instrument in the Southern Hemisphere. Ward built reflecting telescopes of 8 and 12 inch aperture which were often sold to other New Zealand amateur astronomers merely for the cost of the materials used to make them.

Joseph Ward died in Wairoa, on 4 January 1927. He had developed appendicitis while visiting a daughter, and after being operated on, succumbed to peritonitis. He was survived by his wife, four sons and three daughters. In the obituary published by the British Astronomical Association, which Ward had joined on 18 October 1898, he is referred to as having the rare combination of ‘astronomer of philosophical mind and mechanical genius’.
