= Brian Saffery-Cooper =

British sailor

Personal information
- Nationality: British
- Born: 9 July 1934
- Died: 31 December 2017 (aged 83)

Sport
- Sport: Sailing

Brian Saffery-Cooper (9 July 1934 – 31 December 2017) was a British sailor. He competed in the Finn event at the 1964 Summer Olympics.
