= Alan Stephens =

English footballer

Personal information
- Date of birth: 13 October 1952 (age 74)
- Place of birth: Liverpool, England
- Position: Full back

Youth career
- Wolverhampton Wanderers

Senior career*
Years	Team	Apps	(Gls)
1972–1974	Crewe Alexandra	33	(0)
1974–1975	Seattle Sounders	40	(0)
1976	San Diego Jaws	24	(1)
Total		97	(1)
- * Club domestic league appearances and goals

Alan Stephens (born 13 October 1952) is an English former professional footballer who played as a full back. Active in England and the United States, Stephens made nearly 100 appearances in a five-year career.

== Career ==
Born in Liverpool, Stephens played professionally in England and the United States for Wolverhampton Wanderers, Crewe Alexandra, the Seattle Sounders and the San Diego Jaws.
