= Philippe Soria =

French sailor

Philippe Soria (born 9 May 1942) is a French sailor who competed in the 1968 Summer Olympics.

After this result he will be a trainer of Serge-Maury riding FINN sailing boat Olympics games 1972 . Result was a Gold Medal … Then, recognized as National Trainer for the Solo Runners, he prepared next generations. Then, with a partnership he open Port Camargue, CYM, a recognized structure to prepare Sailing Trainers, and also Swimming or Tennis Trainers. After this, Port-Camargue where was built the structure received and became the French Base for America Cup Training.
