= Juan Olabarri =

Spanish sailor

Personal information
- Nationality: Spanish
- Born: 5 July 1936 Las Arenas, Spain
- Died: 17 November 2018 (aged 82) Pamplona, Spain

Sport
- Sport: Sailing

Juan Olabarri (5 July 1936 – 17 November 2018) was a Spanish sailor. He competed in the Finn event at the 1964 Summer Olympics.
