= Michael Maynard (sailor) =

British sailor (1937–2023)

Personal information
- Nationality: British
- Born: 23 February 1937; Saltash, England
- Died: 14 August 2023 (aged 86); Torquay, England

Sport
- Sport: Sailing

Michael Maynard (23 February 1937 – 14 August 2023) was a British sailor. He competed in the Finn event at the 1968 Summer Olympics. Maynard died in Torquay on 14 August 2023, at the age of 86.
