= Tītahi Bay =

Suburb of Porirua

Coordinates: 41°06′S 174°50′E

- Suburb
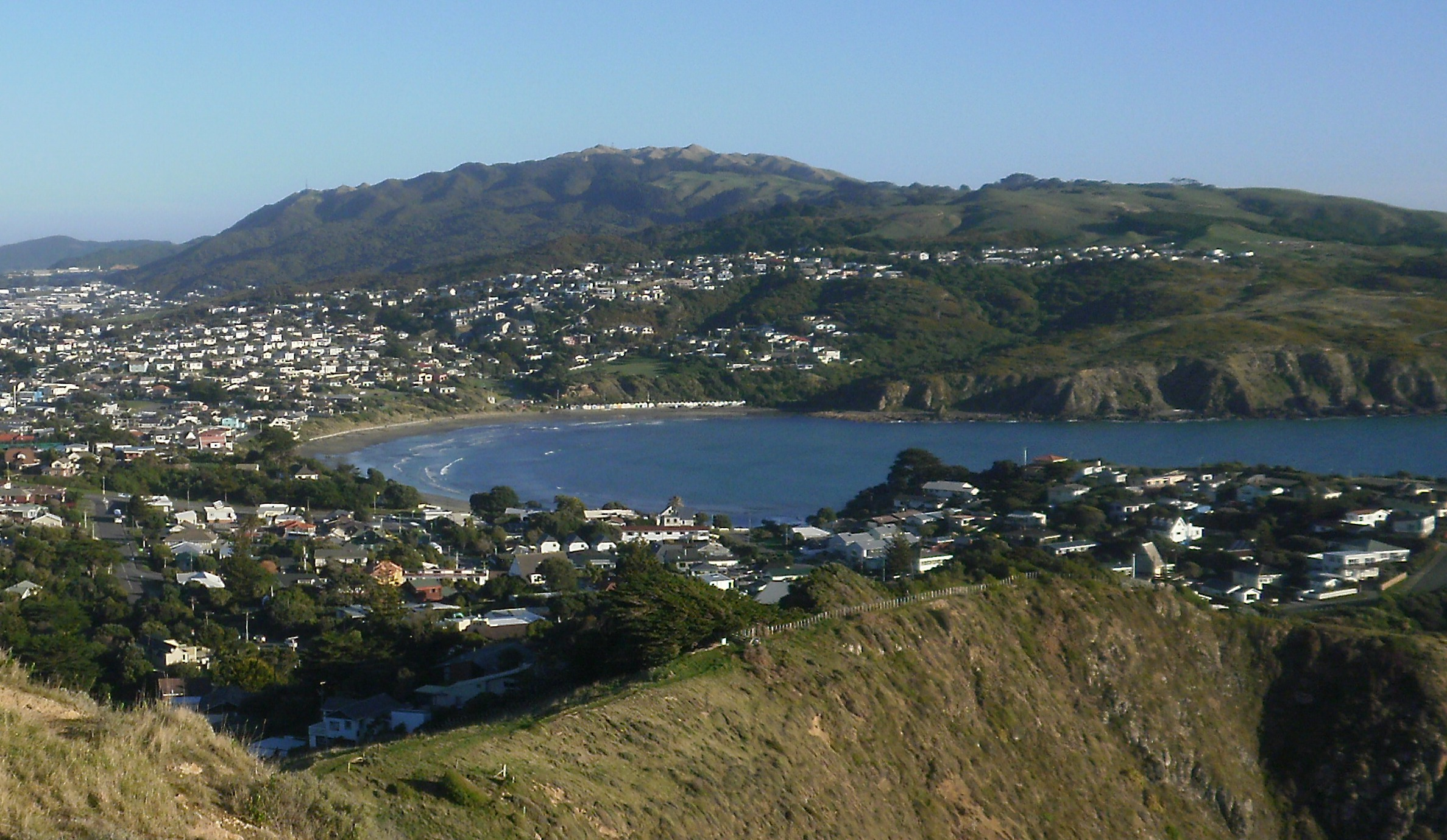
- Interactive map of Tītahi Bay
- Country: New Zealand
- City: Porirua City
- Local authority: Porirua City Council
- Electoral ward: Onepoto General Ward; Porirua Māori Ward

Area
  - Land: 554 ha (1,370 acres)

Population (June 2025)
  - Total: 6,610
  - Density: 1,190/km^{2} (3,090/sq mi)

	Whitireia Park
(Tasman Sea)	Tītahi Bay	Onepoto
	Takapūwāhia	(Porirua Harbour)

Tītahi Bay, also written Titahi Bay, is a suburb of Porirua in metropolitan Wellington, in the lower North Island of New Zealand. It lies at the foot of a short peninsula on the west coast of the Porirua Harbour, to the north of Porirua city centre.

== History ==
The legendary Polynesian navigator Kupe landed at Komanga Point, 3 kilometres west of Titahi Bay, leaving an anchor stone which today can be seen at the Museum of New Zealand Te Papa Tongarewa. The area was settled by Māori for many years before the arrival of Europeans, and several pa sites are located nearby. The area was the site of many inter-iwi conflicts, notably in the 1820s, when the area was invaded by the followers of Te Rauparaha.

The first European residents were whalers operating from Korohiwa, between Titahi Bay and Komanga Point.

During World War II, a camp housing US military personnel was built in Titahi Bay.

In December 2010, the name of the suburb was officially changed to Tītahi Bay by the addition of a macron.

== Demographics ==
Tītahi Bay, comprising the statistical areas of Titahi Bay North and Titahi Bay South, covers 5.54 km^{2} (2.14 sq mi). It had an estimated population of 6,610 as of June 2025, with a population density of 1,193 people per km^{2}. These figures do not include Onepoto, which had a population of 1,980 at that time.

Historical population
Year	Pop.	±% p.a.
2006	5,679	—
2013	6,021	+0.84%
2018	6,432	+1.33%
2023	6,453	+0.07%

Tītahi Bay had a population of 6,453 in the 2023 New Zealand census, an increase of 21 people (0.3%) since the 2018 census, and an increase of 432 people (7.2%) since the 2013 census. There were 3,147 males, 3,291 females, and 15 people of other genders in 2,295 dwellings. 3.3% of people identified as LGBTIQ+. There were 1,374 people (21.3%) aged under 15 years, 1,290 (20.0%) aged 15 to 29, 2,922 (45.3%) aged 30 to 64, and 873 (13.5%) aged 65 or older.

People could identify as more than one ethnicity. The results were 64.3% European (Pākehā); 38.4% Māori; 22.1% Pasifika; 8.2% Asian; 1.9% Middle Eastern, Latin American and African New Zealanders (MELAA); and 1.5% other, which includes people giving their ethnicity as "New Zealander". English was spoken by 95.9%, Māori by 10.5%, Samoan by 4.8%, and other languages by 9.7%. No language could be spoken by 2.6% (e.g. too young to talk). New Zealand Sign Language was known by 0.7%. The percentage of people born overseas was 17.2, compared with 28.8% nationally.

Religious affiliations were 30.8% Christian, 1.3% Hindu, 0.8% Islam, 1.7% Māori religious beliefs, 0.7% Buddhist, 0.4% New Age, and 1.4% other religions. People who answered that they had no religion were 55.2%, and 7.9% of people did not answer the census question.

Of those at least 15 years old, 1,182 (23.3%) people had a bachelor's or higher degree, 2,664 (52.5%) had a post-high school certificate or diploma, and 1,236 (24.3%) people exclusively held high school qualifications. 597 people (11.8%) earned over $100,000 compared to 12.1% nationally. The employment status of those at least 15 was 2,676 (52.7%) full-time, 618 (12.2%) part-time, and 207 (4.1%) unemployed.

Individual statistical areas
Name	Area (km^{2})	Population	Density (per km^{2})	Dwellings	Median age	Median income
Titahi Bay North	2.01	2,709	1,348	1,008	35.5 years	$42,900
Titahi Bay South	3.53	3,744	1,061	1,287	34.9 years	$42,800
New Zealand					38.1 years	$41,500

== Features ==
=== Titahi Bay Beach ===
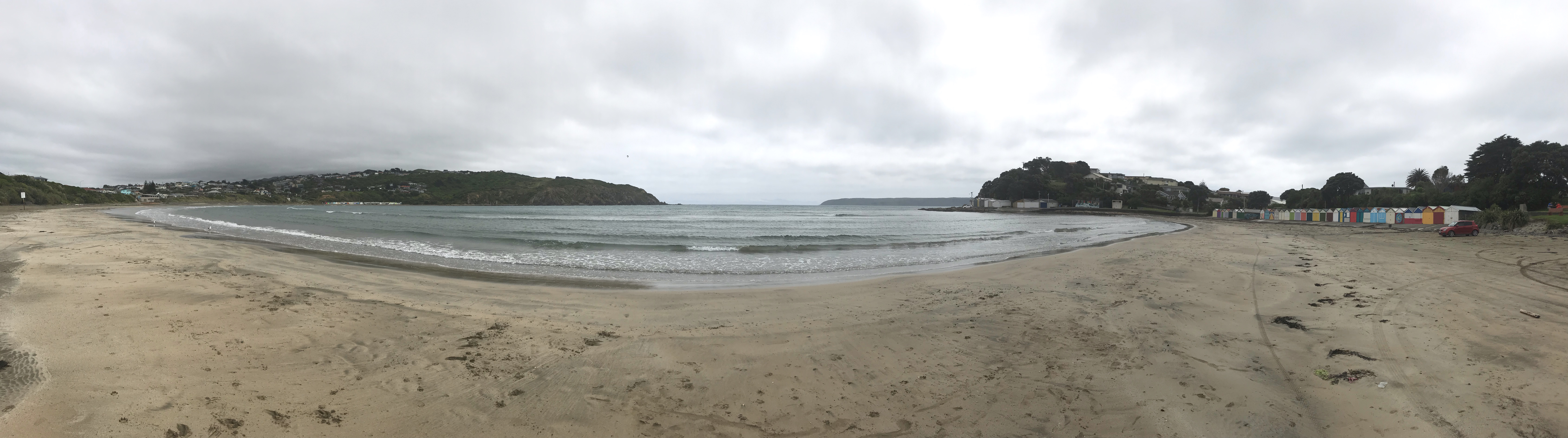
Titahi Bay Beach on a cloudy day

Titahi Bay is one kilometre long and forms a bay. The boat sheds at the northern and southern ends of the beach are often featured in photographs of the area.

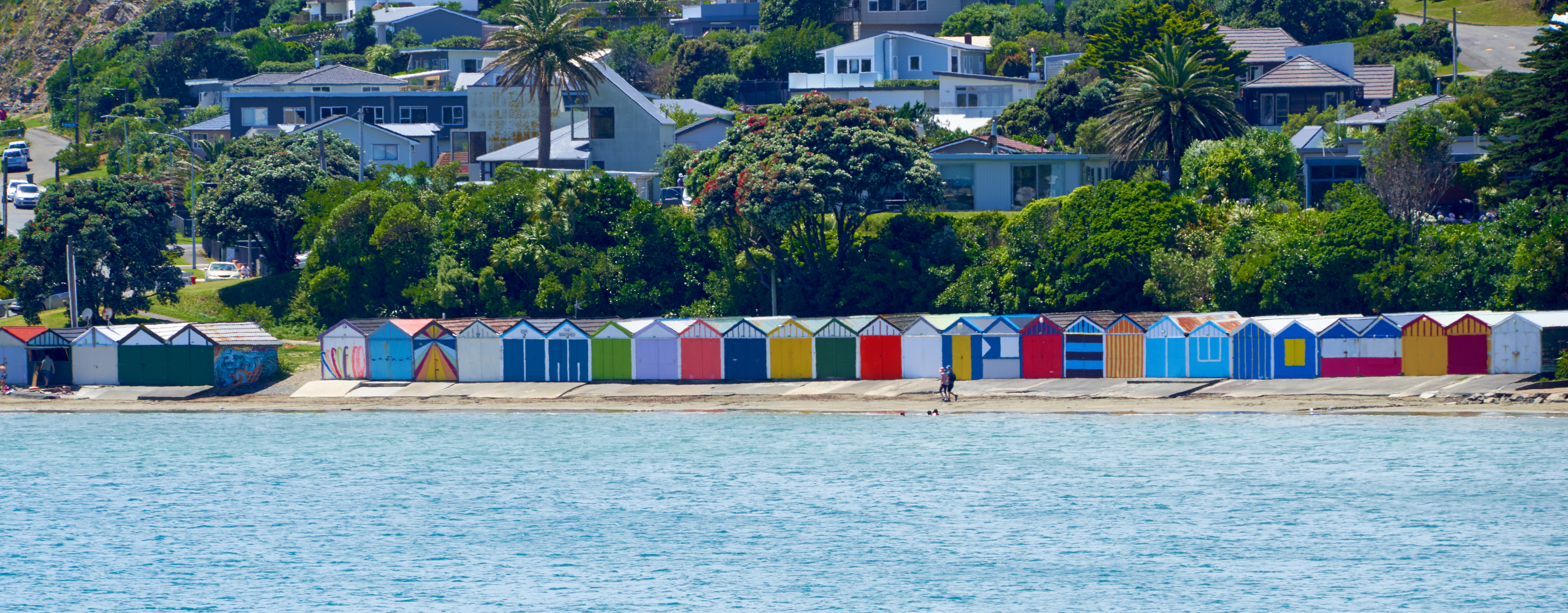
Titahi Bay Beach houses

Surfing is a popular activity there. Titahi Bay is a beach break that can be surfed on all tides and is generally best during periods of onshore winds. The surf breaks have a vast array of size and skill sets, from the Rocks (1.5–2 m) to the famous Locals (1-2m) to the Fishermans (inside 2-3m, outside 3-5m) mainly all from a northwesterly swell direction. This all changes when the south swell arrives, with different breaks from different swell directions. A surfing club has operated for over 30 years. Two NZ champions originate from the area. The Titahi Bay Surf Life Saving Club is located in the centre of the bay.

The fossilised remains of a forest from the Pleistocene era are located at Titahi Bay and form an intertidal reef. The forest was dominated by podocarps and tree-ferns and dates from the last interglacial period 150,000–70,000 years ago.

=== Titahi Bay Volunteer Fire Brigade ===
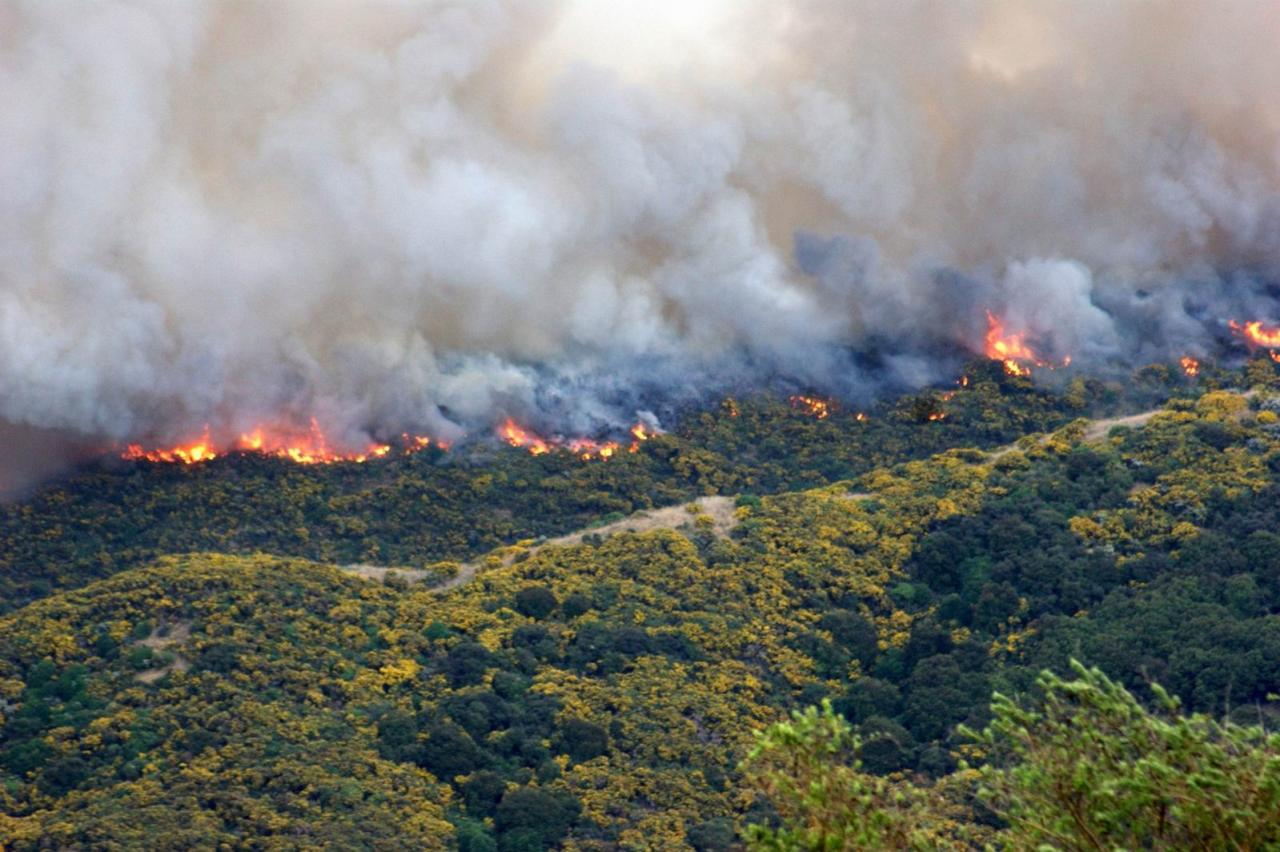
Titahi Bay scrub fire

Founded in 1945, the Titahi Bay Volunteer Fire Brigade operates an Iveco EuroCargo ML120E Type 2 (Medium Pump) Appliance and currently has 20 volunteer firefighters. The Titahi Bay Volunteer Fire Brigade operates in the Fire and Emergency New Zealand's Fire Region 3.

=== Porirua Little Theatre ===
It was founded in 1950 as Titahi Bay Little Theatre by Ellinore Ginn, in the recreation hall used by US Marines encamped at Titahi Bay during World War II.

== Transport ==
Bus route 210 runs between Titahi Bay and Porirua Railway Station. Bus route 220 runs between Titahi Bay and Ascot Park.

== Education ==
Titahi Bay School is a state primary school for Year 1 to 6 students, with a roll of 344. It opened in 1953 on the site of a World War II US Marine base.

Titahi Bay North School is a state primary school for Year 1 to 8 students, with a roll of 110. It started as a side school for Titahi Bay School in 1957, and became a separate school in 1958.

Ngāti Toa School is a state primary school for Year 1 to 6 students with a roll of 122. It opened in 1955.

St Pius X School is a state-integrated Catholic primary school for Year 1 to 6 students, with a roll of 17. It opened in 1954. It is scheduled to be closed at the end of the 2026 school year.

Titahi Bay Intermediate is a state intermediate for Year 7 to 8 students, with a roll of 168 as of March 2026. It opened in 1970.

All these schools are co-educational. Rolls are as of March 2026.

== Location in films ==
Many location shots in the 2007 Taika Waititi film Eagle vs Shark originated in Tītahi Bay.

== Sports ==
Sporting organisations in Titahi Bay:

- Titahi Bay Boating Club
- Titahi Bay Bowling Club
- Titahi Bay Golf Club
- Titahi Bay Surf Life Saving Club
- Titahi Bay Tennis Club
- Titahi Bay Boxing Club
- Titahi Bay Surfers (Porirua Surfing Troupe Inc.)

The cliffs along Titahi Bay have a history of rock climbing. Titahi Bay became the most popular rock-climbing spot in the Wellington area in the 1940s.

== Climate ==
Climate data for Titahi Bay (1981–2010)
Month	Jan	Feb	Mar	Apr	May	Jun	Jul	Aug	Sep	Oct	Nov	Dec	Year
Mean daily maximum °C (°F)	21.4 (70.5)	21.9 (71.4)	20.2 (68.4)	17.7 (63.9)	15.3 (59.5)	13.2 (55.8)	12.4 (54.3)	13.1 (55.6)	14.7 (58.5)	16.0 (60.8)	17.6 (63.7)	19.8 (67.6)	16.9 (62.5)
Daily mean °C (°F)	17.8 (64.0)	17 (63)	16.3 (61.3)	13.9 (57.0)	11.9 (53.4)	9.8 (49.6)	8.9 (48.0)	9.3 (48.7)	11.1 (52.0)	12.6 (54.7)	14.1 (57.4)	16.3 (61.3)	13.3 (55.9)
Mean daily minimum °C (°F)	14.2 (57.6)	13.8 (56.8)	12.4 (54.3)	10.1 (50.2)	8.4 (47.1)	6.3 (43.3)	5.4 (41.7)	5.6 (42.1)	7.5 (45.5)	9.2 (48.6)	10.5 (50.9)	12.8 (55.0)	9.7 (49.4)
Source: NIWA

== Notable people ==
- Ron Farrell, rugby league player
- Sean Wade, Olympic runner
- Michael Campbell, international golfer
- Gary McCormick, radio and TV personality
- Emmett Skilton, film and television actor
- Lynnette Brooky, sportsperson
- Tamati Ellison, sportsperson
- TJ Perenara, All Black

== See also ==
- George French Angas
- Titahi Bay Transmitter
