= Alan Stevens (sailor) =

Hong Kong sailor

Personal information
- Nationality: Hong Konger
- Born: 20 January 1933 (age 92)
- Height: 156 cm (5 ft 1 in)
- Weight: 79 kg (174 lb)

Sport
- Sport: Sailing

Alan Stevens (born 20 January 1933) is a Hong Kong sailor. He competed in the Finn event at the 1964 Summer Olympics.
