= Daniel Mújica =

Mexican sailor (born 1946)

Personal information
- Born: 21 November 1946 (age 78); Veracruz, Mexico

Sport
- Sport: Sailing

Daniel Mújica (born 21 November 1946) is a Mexican sailor. He competed at the 1968 Summer Olympics and the 1976 Summer Olympics.
