= Mike Maynard (footballer) =

Guyanese footballer

Personal information
- Full name: Michael Clements Maynard
- Date of birth: 7 January 1947 (age 79)
- Place of birth: Georgetown, Guyana
- Position: Full-back

Senior career*
| Years | Team | Apps | (Gls) |
- Hounslow Town
| 1966–1967 | Crystal Palace | 0 | (0) |
| 1967–1968 | Peterborough United | 3 | (0) |
| 1968–1970 | Brentwood Town | | |
| 1970–1971 | Chelmsford City | 21 | (0) |
- Hillingdon Borough
- * Club domestic league appearances and goals

Michael Clements Maynard (born 7 January 1947) is a former Guyanese footballer who played as a full-back.

== Career ==
In March 1966, Maynard signed for Crystal Palace from Hounslow Town. After failing to make an appearance at Crystal Palace, Maynard joined Peterborough United in July 1967. During his only season at Peterborough, Maynard made three Football League appearances for the club. Following his spell at Peterborough, Maynard played for Brentwood Town and Chelmsford City. After 33 appearances in all competitions for Chelmsford, Maynard signed for Hillingdon Borough in 1971.
