= Panagiotis Koulingas =

Greek sailor

Personal information
- Nationality: Greek
- Born: 31 March 1946 (age 78); Athens, Greece

Sport
- Sport: Sailing

Panagiotis Koulingas (born 31 March 1946) is a Greek sailor. He competed at the 1964 Summer Olympics and the 1968 Summer Olympics.
