= Gary McCormick =

New Zealand poet and broadcaster (born 1951)

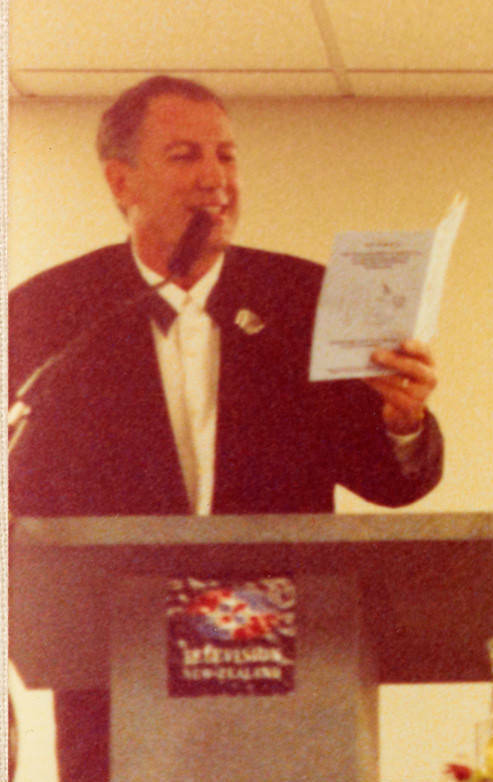
- McCormick at the Celebrity Debate at Takapuna Library in 1993
- Born: Gary Wayne McCormick; 23 October 1951 (age 74); Upper Hutt, New Zealand
- Presenting career
- Country: New Zealand

Gary McCormick is a New Zealand poet, radio and television personality, debater and raconteur.

McCormick began writing poetry in 1968. His published volumes are Gypsies (with Jon Benson, 1974), Naked and Nameless (1976), Poems for the Red Engine (1978), Poems by Request (1979), Scarlet Letters (1980), Zephyr (1982) and Lost at Sea (1995). He also wrote Performance—A Guide to the Performing Arts in New Zealand for the Department of Internal Affairs (1979) and the satiric secret diary of Jacques Chirac, Honey, I blew up the Atoll (with Scott Wilson, 1995). He is also a long-time collaborator and friend of Sam Hunt.

At the 1974 local body elections McCormick was elected a member of the Porirua City Council. In 1976 he "went walkabout", according to The Evening Post newspaper, missing three consecutive council meetings and his seat was to be declared vacant forcing the council to hold a by-election to replace him. McCormick said he joined the council "charged with youthful ideology" but found himself unable to shift entrenched attitudes. In his eventual letter of resignation he said he was unwilling to "waste time and energy fighting the tide of reaction, as he had been unable to bring about a single concession towards an alternative or more appropriate way for the future."

Invited to front a television documentary Raglan by the Sea, his offbeat, amusing style won his first television outing the Documentary of the Year award. He went on to present a successful documentary series called Heartland where Gary documented the lives of the locals in small towns across New Zealand. Notable stories included the lovable girl from Wainuiomata, called Chloe Reeves, who became a national sensation overnight, with her tiger slippers and interesting lifestyle. McCormick also featured in advertisements for hardware retailer Mitre 10 during the late 1980s and early 1990s.

In 1990, McCormick hosted the New Zealand Labour Party's election broadcast, interviewing Prime Minister Mike Moore and his wife Yvonne.

In 1997, he was named New Zealand Entertainer of the Year.

In 2001, he appeared on a celebrity special of The Weakest Link.

He has held a variety of other positions - a gardener for Porirua Hospital, a Merry-go-round operator and MCing the Sweetwaters Music Festival.

McCormick left his breakfast radio slot in April 2023 which he had co-hosted on More FM for 18 years in order to take up a new role with newly created station Today FM, however Today FM was abruptly pulled off air before McCormick started. Although his role change was within the same company he had worked for whilst at More FM, McCormick did not receive redundancy because he was listed as an independent contractor.

== See also ==
- List of New Zealand television personalities
