= Harata Solomon =

New Zealand community leader (1925–1993)

Harata Ria Te Uira Solomon QSO
- Born: Harata Ria Te Uira Parata; January 22, 1925; Ōtaki, New Zealand
- Died: July 20, 1993 (aged 68)
- Occupations: Teacher, entertainer, community leader
- Known for: Leadership in the Church of Jesus Christ of Latter-day Saints
- Spouse: Matuaiwi Solomon (m. 1947)
- Children: 8
- Awards: Companion of the Queen's Service Order (1990)

Harata Ria Te Uira Solomon QSO (née Parata; 22 January 1925 – 20 July 1993) was a notable New Zealand teacher, entertainer, community leader and leader in The Church of Jesus Christ of Latter-day Saints. Of Māori descent, she identified with the Ngāti Raukawa, Ngāti Toa and Te Āti Awa iwi. She was born in Ōtaki, New Zealand, in 1925. She was a member of the Church of Jesus Christ of Latter-day Saints and was a local leader in the Relief Society.

On 7 August 1947 she married her cousin Matuaiwi Solomon and had eight children together. At the 1962 local elections Matuaiwi stood for the Porirua Borough Council and was elected.

In the 1990 New Year Honours, Solomon was appointed a Companion of the Queen's Service Order for community service.
