= 1962 Porirua mayoral election =

- 13 October 1962
- Turnout: 2,426 (50.00%)
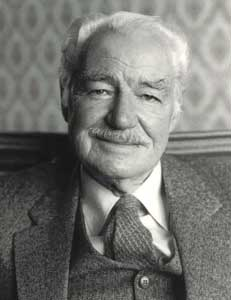

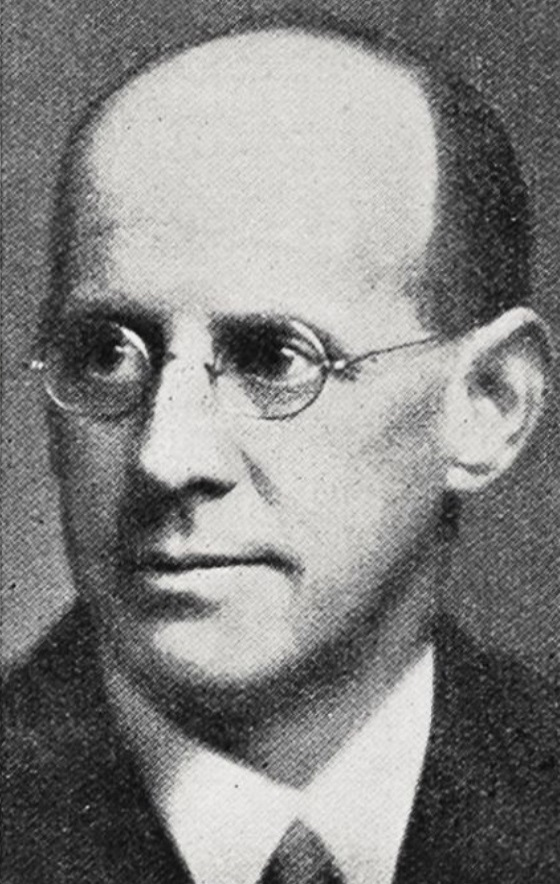
Candidate	Whitford Brown	Rairi Field	Robert Bothamley
Party	Independent	Independent	Independent
Popular vote	885	667	558
Percentage	36.47	27.49	23.00
Elected mayor
Whitford Brown

The 1962 Porirua mayoral election was part of the New Zealand local elections held that same year. The elections were held for the role of Mayor of Porirua plus other local government positions including ten borough councillors, also elected triennially. The polling was conducted using the standard first-past-the-post electoral method.

== Background ==
The locality of Porirua was part the Makara County Council which was abolished on 31 August 1962. The rural area became part of Hutt County, the urban area becoming Porirua Borough Council.

The Labour Party selected a ticket for the mayoralty as well as council candidates. Makara County Councillor Whitford Brown was nominated as part of the Labour's ticket for the election, but he declined any party endorsement. Brown attracted many Labour voters, particularly as Labour did not select a mayoral candidate after Brown his declination, and was successful in being elected Porirua's first mayor. He defeated four other candidates including another Makara County Councillor, Alf Mexted, and the former chairman of the Makara County Council, Robert Westley Bothamley, who was at the time the sitting chairman of the Hutt Valley Electric Board.

The council had its first meeting on 24 October where members were sworn in and councillor Ernie Maxwell was appointed deputy mayor.

== Mayoral results ==
1962 Porirua mayoral election
Party	Candidate	Votes	%	±%
Independent	Whitford Brown	885	36.47	
Independent	Rairi Field	667	27.49	
Independent	Robert Westley Bothamley	558	23.00	
Independent Labour	Jim Hunter	161	6.63	
Independent	Alf Mexted	134	5.52	
Informal votes		21	0.86	
Majority		218	8.98	
Turnout		2,426	50.00	

== Councillor results ==
1962 Porirua Borough Council election
Party	Candidate	Votes	%	±%
Independent	Whitford Brown (Note: As Brown won the Mayoralty his election to the council was voided and his seat was awarded to the highest polling unsuccessful candidate.)	1,285	62.22	
Independent	Jill Nixon	1,157	56.02	
Independent	Christina Sylvia Bell	1,138	55.10	
Independent	Ernie Maxwell	1,033	50.02	
Independent	James Hamilton Wilson	1,011	48.95	
Independent	Charles Jane	1,005	48.66	
Independent	Bill Arnold	921	44.60	
Independent	Alf Mexted	874	42.32	
Labour	Duncan MacLeod	865	41.88	
Labour	Mervyn Down	852	41.25	
Independent	Matuaiwi Solomon	839	40.62	
Independent	Donald Collins	828	40.09	
Independent	John David Keay	825	39.95	
Labour	Brownie Pūriri	784	37.96	
Labour	Kevin Arthurs	782	37.86	
Independent	Hec Stuart	781	37.82	
Independent	John Marsh	735	35.59	
Labour	Emily Anne Moffitt	735	35.59	
Labour	Neville Collins	660	31.96	
Labour	Charles Weller	644	31.18	
Independent	Ivan Williams	571	27.65	
Independent	Walter Cecil Henderson	535	25.90	
Independent	Arthur Neville Cole	448	21.69	
Communist	Paul Potiki	379	18.35	
Independent	Jack Underhill	363	17.57	
Communist	Tommy Heptinstall	323	15.64	
Independent	Noel Tock	278	13.46	

Table footnotes:
