= Ron Farrell =

New Zealand rugby league footballer

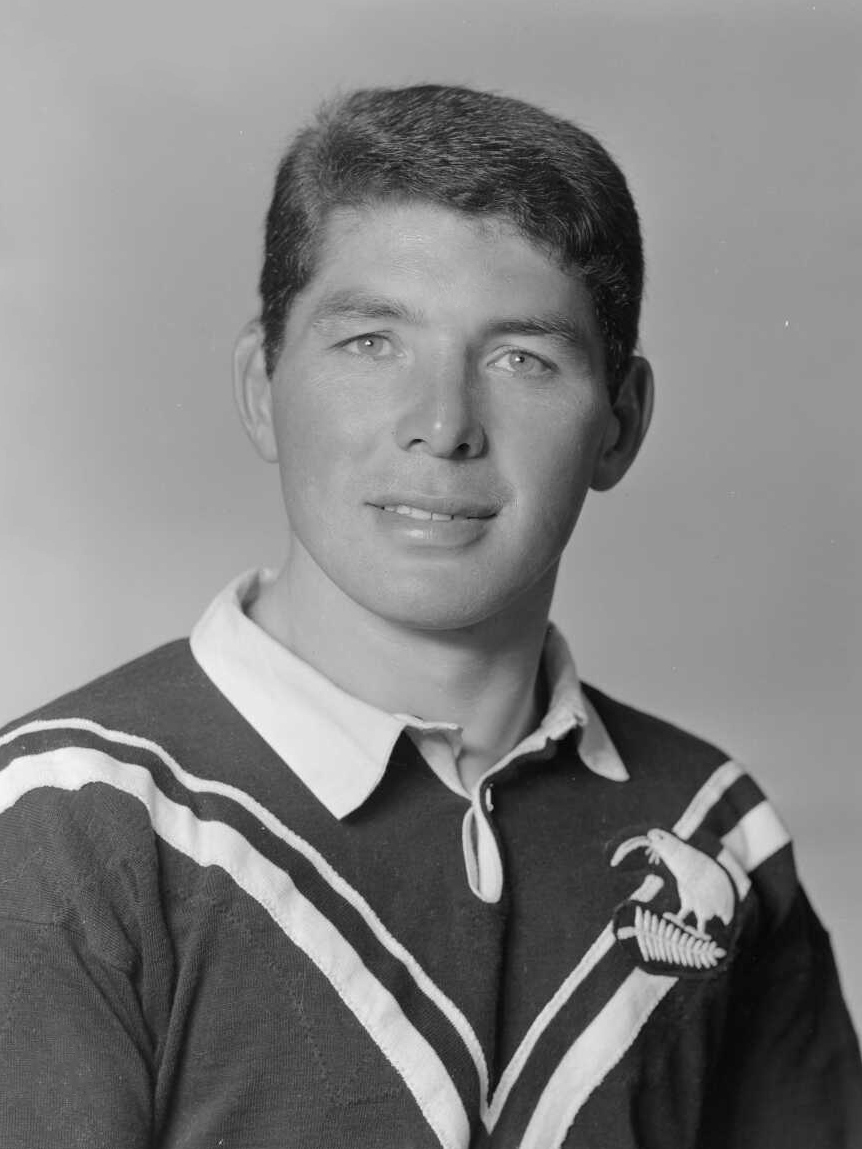
- Farrell in 1966

Personal information
- Full name: Ronald Farrell
- Born: 26 September 1939 (age 86) Gisborne, New Zealand
- Height: 178 cm (5 ft 10 in)
- Weight: 89 kg (14 st 0 lb)

Playing information
- Position: Prop, Second-row, Loose forward
Club
Years	Team	Pld	T	G	FG	P
	Watersiders (WRL)
Representative
Years	Team	Pld	T	G	FG	P
	Wellington	81
	New Zealand Māori

Ronald Farrell (born 26 September 1939) is a New Zealand former rugby league representative player. He played at representative level for New Zealand, New Zealand Māori, Wellington, and at club level for the Watersiders.

He played an unbeaten record 81 games for Wellington.
