= Karsten Boysen =

Venezuelan sailor (born 1938)

Personal information
- Nationality: Venezuelan
- Born: 1 March 1938 (age 87); Kiel, Germany

Sport
- Sport: Sailing

Karsten Boysen (born 1 March 1938) is a Venezuelan sailor. He competed at the 1964 Summer Olympics and the 1968 Summer Olympics.
