= Helen Smith (New Zealand politician) =

New Zealand artist, teacher and politician

Helen Smith QSM JP
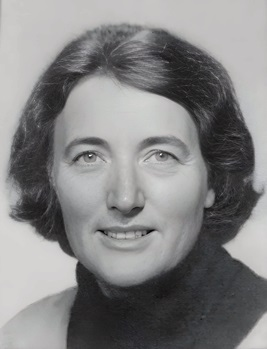
- Smith in 1973

Member of the Porirua City Council
- In office 10 March 1973 – 13 October 2001
- Preceded by: Tutuira Wi Neera

Personal details
- Born: Helen Mary Paine; 25 May 1927 Piopio, New Zealand
- Died: 26 December 2007 (aged 80) Tītahi Bay, New Zealand
- Party: Values Party

Helen Mary Smith QSM JP (née Paine; 25 May 1927 – 26 December 2007) was a New Zealand artist, teacher and politician. She was a Porirua City Councillor from 1973 until 2001.

== Biography ==
Smith was born at Piopio into a farming family. Encouraged by her parents in literature and the arts she later moved to Hamilton and was part of the local art scene. She then moved to Dunedin to study towards a home sciences degree at the University of Otago. While studying there she met medical student Allan Smith. They married and moved to Tītahi Bay in 1954 where he established a medical practice. She was a mathematics teacher at a girls' high school in Wellington.

After joining the Values Party, Smith stood in the Porirua electorate at the 1972 election placing third. Smith stood as Values candidate for in Porirua at the 1975 and 1978 elections as well, with 2,176 and 2,043 votes; coming third each time and gaining the highest number of votes of any Values Party candidate in the country in 1978. In 1977 she was appointed the Values Party spokesperson on health, education and welfare.

Smith organised a 1974 petition to Parliament criticising Porirua MP Gerry Wall for introducing the Hospitals Amendment Bill, which proposed to restrict therapeutic abortions to public hospitals. Wall said the petition was not "adequately representing" the electorate. The petitioners accused Wall of using a position of constitutional authority to promote a personal view and urged for abortion law reform be put up for full discussion and debate with the bill being referred to a select committee. In 1975 parliament's social services committee recommended that the petition be referred to the Government for favourable consideration.

She then won a seat on the Porirua City Council at a 1973 by-election. Re-elected for the council in 1974, Smith was also the runner-up in the 1977 Porirua mayoral election. As well as standing for mayor she stood for the council as well and was successful. Smith was an activist in Porirua over several community issues. From 1980 to 2001, when she was narrowly defeated (leaving no artists on the council) Smith was chairperson of the Community Development Committee, which saw her responsible for the library services in Porirua, widely considered to be excellent. She was also strong supporter for the Pataka Complex and an art gallery in Porirua. The Porirua City Council has named a room in the local Pataka Museum and a prize after her. In 1998 she was nominated for the position of deputy mayor, however she lost by one vote to the incumbent, Labour Party councillor Jasmine Underhill.

Smith was awarded the Queens Service Medal in the 1995 Queen's Birthday Honours for public services.

She lived in Tītahi Bay with her husband Dr Allan Smith and had four children and five grandchildren. She died on 26 December 2007 from cancer.
