= Colin Beyer =

New Zealand lawyer

- Born: Colin Andrew Nielsen Beyer; 10 September 1938; Wellington, New Zealand
- Died: 21 August 2015 (aged 76); Wellington, New Zealand
- Education: Victoria University of Wellington
- Occupations: Lawyer, director
- Organization: Simpson Grierson
- Known for: Past chairman of Tower Ltd; Securities Commissioner
- Children: Georgina Beyer (stepdaughter)

Colin Andrew Nielsen Beyer (10 September 1938 – 21 August 2015) was a New Zealand lawyer. He was a partner and then consultant with Simpson Grierson in Wellington. Also a prominent businessman with many governance positions, Beyer was a securities commissioner on the Securities Commission of New Zealand from 2001 until 2010. He was the stepfather of former Member of Parliament Georgina Beyer.

== Early life ==
Of Danish descent, Beyer was born in Wellington on 10 September 1938 to Knud Johan Nielsen and Carla Emilie (née Pallesen) Beyer. His father worked on the wharves in Wellington and his mother worked for the Education Department. Together with his younger brother Trevor and his sister Olga, they lived in Island Bay. Both brothers attended Wellington College.

== Professional career ==
Beyer was educated at Victoria University of Wellington. He graduated with an LLB and was admitted to the bar in 1962. His specialties are corporate law and mining law. He was a partner with Simpson Grierson for ten years until 2003, when he became a consultant (the term that Simpson Grierson uses for former partners). As of December 2010, Beyer is no longer listed on the Simpson Grierson website as a consultant.

Beyer was a prominent businessman with considerable governance experience. He was made a Distinguished Fellow of the Institute of Directors in 2006. He served as Chairman of the Accident Compensation Corporation, Government Property Services Ltd., Capital Properties New Zealand Ltd, Tower Ltd and Summit Resources Ltd, and a director of Capital Power Ltd and TrustPower Ltd. He was a ministerial appointee on the Wellington Area Health Board and the Wellington Polytechnic Board.

He was chairman of the Tower Corporation from 1990 until his resignation in 2003. The sacking of managing director James Boonzaier in 2002 under his chairmanship caused some controversy. Beyer was widely criticised in financial circles for publicly blaming Boonzaier for Tower's poor financial performance, and Beyer's decision not to stand for re-election prior to the 2003 AGM is described as having prevented the "possibility of a humiliating defeat". Bruce Sheppard, the founder of the New Zealand Shareholder's Association, criticised the board of Tower under Beyer's chairmanship over the setting of directors' fees and the payment of retirement allowances. Sheppard described the practices of the board as "the most outrageous gaming by the most reprehensible group".

Beyer was appointed to the Securities Commission in February 2001 for a four-year term. In early 2005, he was reappointed for a second five-year term by Commerce Minister Pete Hodgson. In 2009, Minister of Commerce Simon Power announced that Beyer would retire in February 2010, to be succeeded by Simon Botherway.

He was the Honorary Consul-General of Finland from 1993, and was by 2006 the Dean of the Consular Corps in Wellington. He was made a Commander of the Order of the Lion of Finland.

== Political career ==
In the 1970s, while living in Camborne, he spent some time on the Porirua City Council, first as an independent and later as a Labour Party representative. During his time as a Porirua city councillor Beyer was widely respected for his sound judgement and a broad knowledge and understanding of the complex range of issues the City was dealing with. He later moved to Kelburn.

== Family ==
Beyer was married to Noeline Bertrand (née Tamati). Her daughter from her previous marriage, Georgina Beyer, came to live with them following their marriage after having spent the previous years with Noeline's parents. Their son Andrew was born in December 1963. With marital problems developing, Georgina was sent to Wellesley College boarding school, where she tried to commit suicide for feeling rejected by her parents. Colin Beyer separated from Noeline in 1971 and moved to Brooklyn, where he shared an apartment with Ron Brierley, whom he knew from Wellington College. He married Brazilian-born Anna and had two sons. He also gained custody of his son Andrew.

Georgina Beyer came out first to her stepfather, before telling her mother about her 1984 sex reassignment surgery. She achieved fame as the world's first transgender Member of Parliament.

== Death ==
Colin Beyer died on 21 August 2015. His funeral was held at Old St. Paul's, Mulgrave St, Wellington.
