= Whitford Brown =

Whitford Brown CBE
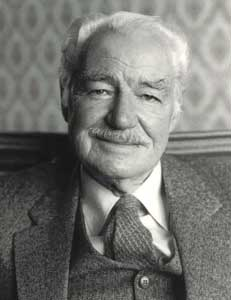

1st Mayor of Porirua
- In office 24 October 1962 – 8 October 1983
- Succeeded by: John Burke

Personal details
- Born: Whitford James Richard Brown; 13 May 1910 Greymouth, New Zealand
- Died: 14 April 1986 (aged 75) Porirua, New Zealand
- Party: Labour
- Spouse: Frances Ward
- Relatives: Joseph Ward (father-in-law)

Whitford James Richard Brown CBE (13 May 1910 – 14 April 1986) was the foundation mayor of Porirua City, a city in the Wellington Region of New Zealand, for 21 years from 1962 to 1983. Previously, Porirua was part of what was then called the Makara County Council. In 1961, the Local Government Commission deemed that Porirua should become a borough. The region had its first elections in October 1962, and, Brown was elected mayor.

== Biography ==
Whitford James Richard Brown was born at Maori Creek near Greymouth in the South Island on 13 May 1910. He moved to Wanganui as a teenager, then transferred from the New Zealand Public Works Department to the New Zealand Railways Department at Wanganui, where he worked as a civil engineer until shifting to Porirua East in Christmas 1954 to work in the New Zealand Railways head office in Wellington.

After his marriage to Frances Ward, daughter of New Zealand astronomer Joseph Thomas Ward, Brown and his family settled in Porirua East. Their 4 Martin Street home was one of many in the Government's state housing scheme but, at this time, there were relatively few houses at all in the area and remote from shops and other facilities.

He first stood for the then Makara County Council in 1959, and although he was unsuccessful, was elected at a by-election the following year.

== Mayor of Porirua ==
Two years later, when Porirua was constituted a borough, Brown stood for mayor at that years elections. A member of the Labour Party, he was nominated as part of the party's ticket for the election. However he declined, refusing any party endorsements, though he still attracted many Labour voters particularly as Labour did not select a mayoral candidate after Brown declined. Brown was successful and was elected Porirua's first mayor. His first official function was to open the Mungavin Avenue Community Hall in Porirua East. His first concern as mayor was to obtain industrial land and the then Prime Minister of New Zealand Keith Holyoake proved most helpful, becoming one of Brown's closest friends.

The new borough negotiated with the government to free land where the Todd Motors car assembly plant was built in 1975, and Broken Hill was also zoned industrial use. Other major industries were also established as well as a modern shopping centre where there once had been empty space. "It was like being the midwife at the birth of a new community," Brown once said.

Porirua became a city in 1965 and Brown was the city's first mayor, and was re-elected at every election until he retired from the mayoralty in 1983.

During his 21 years as mayor, Brown led a multicultural city and supported initiatives related to racial harmony. He referred to himself as ‘The only white mayor called Brown in New Zealand’.

Ahead of the 1969 election he put himself forward for the Labour Party nomination to stand in the newly created Porirua electorate, but lost to Gerry Wall.

In 1970, he was the recipient of the Winston Churchill Memorial Trust Award and spent three and a half months studying pollution problems overseas. In 1975 Brown was caught on Mungavin Avenue while driving under the influence of alcohol and the ensuing conviction resulted in the loss of his seats on the Porirua Licensing Trust Board and the Wellington Harbour Board.

1980 saw the establishment of a sheltered workshop for handicapped people at Tītahi Bay, a suburb of Porirua, which bears his name: "The Whitford Brown Community Workshop", which is designed to help people with disabilities get back into the workforce.

Brown died on 14 April 1986, following an accident at home (cerebral haemorrhage). Following cremation, his ashes were buried at Whenua Tapu Cemetery in Porirua.

== Honorific eponym ==
In 1970 Whitford Brown Avenue just north of the Porirua Shopping Centre was named in his honour.

== Awards and honours ==
In the 1972 Queen's Birthday Honours, Brown was appointed an Officer of the Order of the British Empire, for services as mayor of Porirua. He was promoted to Commander of the same order, for services to the city of Porirua, in the 1984 New Year Honours. In 1977, Brown was awarded the Queen Elizabeth II Silver Jubilee Medal.

Brown was closely associated with many Porirua and regional community and business organisations over the years; including:

- Member Hutt Valley Energy Board (1983–1986)
- Trustee Wellington Trustee Savings Bank (1975–1986)
- Chairman of Porirua College Board of Governors (1966–1983)
- Wellington Regional Councillor (1980–1983)
- Wellington Harbour Board (1974–1975)
- Trustee Porirua Licensing Trust (1968–1975)
- Patron of the Maraeroa Community Trust (1972–1986)

== Footnotes ==
Political offices
New office	Mayor of Porirua; 1962–1983	Succeeded by John Burke
