= 1998 Porirua mayoral election =

- 10 October 1998
- Turnout: 15,512
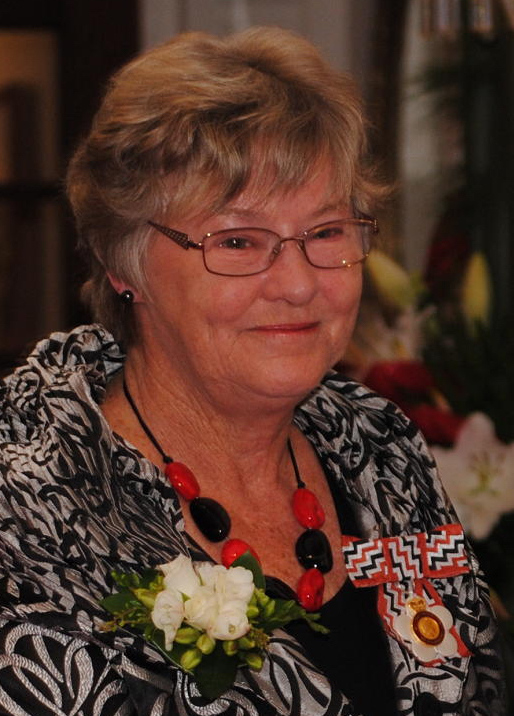

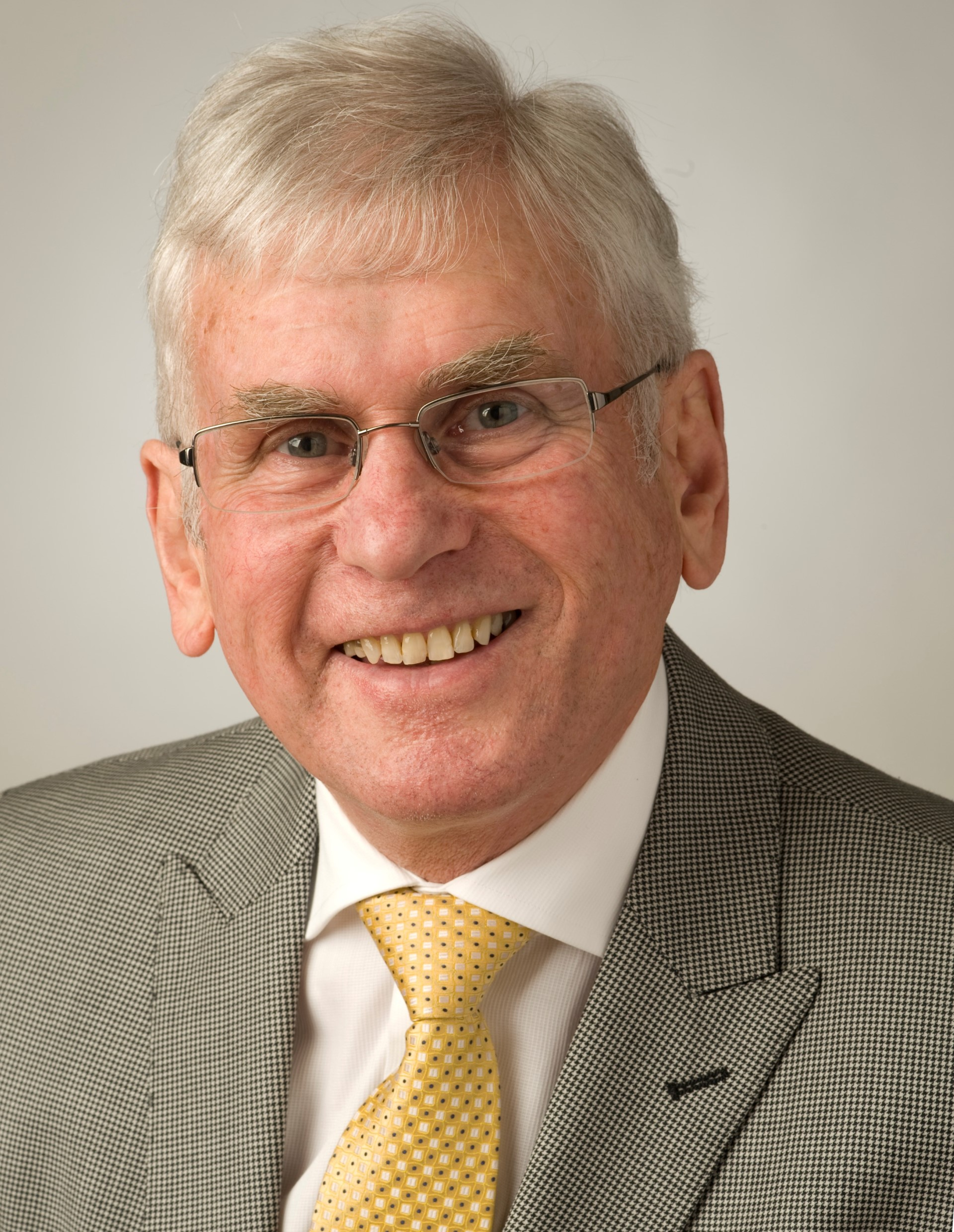
Candidate	Jenny Brash	John Burke
Party	Independent	Labour
Popular vote	9,360	6,137
Percentage	60.34	39.56
Mayor before election
John Burke
Elected mayor
Jenny Brash

The 1998 Porirua mayoral election was part of the New Zealand local elections held that same year. The elections were held for the role of Mayor of Porirua plus other local government positions including thirteen city councillors, also elected triennially. The polling was conducted using the standard first-past-the-post electoral method.

== Background ==
An effort was made by centre-right voters to avoid a repeat of the previous election where multiple right-leaning mayoral candidates split the vote and allowed Labour Party mayor John Burke to be re-elected on a minority vote. A right-leaning ticket was set up called the Porirua Independents Network (PIN) to oppose Labour's running of the city and bring about change. PIN managed to arrange for only one candidate to run against Burke, former Plimmerton ward councillor Jenny Brash who ran as an independent but was endorsed by PIN. Brash was successful and defeated Burke by a surprisingly large majority. She campaigned on a change of direction and the construction of a new hospital in Kenepuru. Burke stated that he was not surprised that he was defeated, but was by the margin of defeat. Despite succeeding in their goal of unseating the mayor, all of PIN's eleven council candidates were defeated. Despite losing the mayoral contest Labour's vote held up with its six incumbent councillors being re-elected comfortably.

Notable council ward results were the election of Council of Trade Unions president Ken Douglas, the election 19 year old future mayor Nick Leggett and the defeat of high profile maverick councillor Don Borrie. Labour retained a working majority on the council with the vote of Douglas who voted to retain Labour councillor Jasmine Underhill as deputy mayor over the other nominee, councillor Helen Smith.

== Mayoral results ==
The following table gives the election results:

1998 Porirua mayoral election
Party	Candidate	Votes	%	±%
Independent	Jenny Brash	9,360	60.34	+36.79
Labour	John Burke	6,137	39.56	−0.77
Informal votes		15	0.09	−1.67
Majority		3,223	20.77	
Turnout		15,512		

== Ward results ==
Candidates were also elected from wards to the Porirua City Council.

Party/ticket	Councillors
Independent	7
Labour	6
