= 1998 Porirua City Council election =

Local election in New Zealand

- 10 October 1998
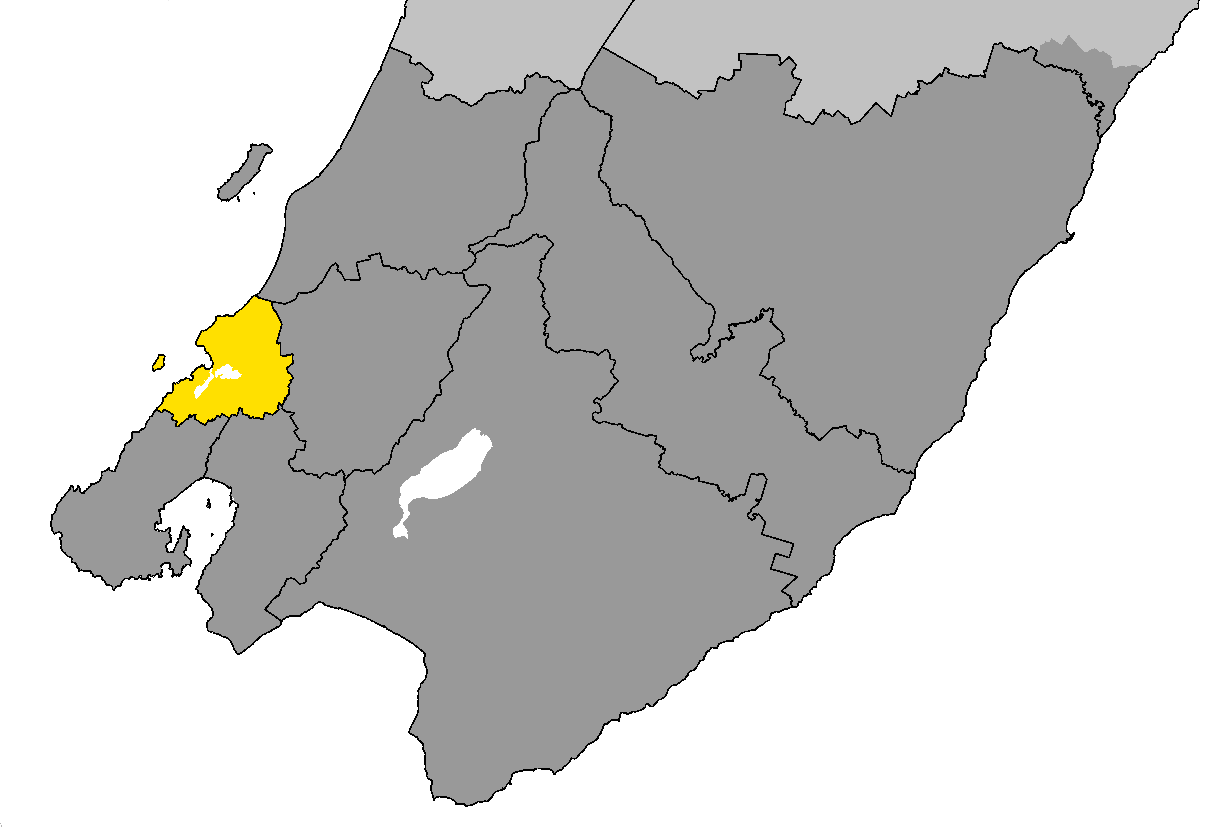
- Position of Porirua City within Wellington Region

The 1998 Porirua City Council election was part of the 1998 New Zealand local elections, to elect members to sub-national councils and boards. The polling was conducted using the first-past-the-post electoral method.

== Council ==
The Porirua City Council consisted of a mayor and thirteen councillors elected from three wards (Eastern, Northern and Western).

=== Mayor ===
1998 Porirua mayoral election
Party	Candidate	Votes	%	±%
Independent	Jenny Brash	9,360	60.34	+36.79
Labour	John Burke	6,137	39.56	−0.77
Informal votes		15	0.09	−1.67
Majority		3,223	20.77	
Turnout		15,512		

==== Eastern Ward ====
The Eastern Ward elected five members to the Porirua City Council

Eastern Ward
Party	Candidate	Votes	%	±%
Labour	Jasmine Underhill	3,103	74.14	
Labour	Geoff Walpole	2,756	65.85	
Labour	Kevin Watson	2,727	65.16	
Labour	David Stanley	2,614	62.46	
Labour	Naureen Palmer	2,607	62.29	
Porirua Independents	Tino Meleisea	1,625	38.82	
Porirua Independents	Marie Iupeli	1,283	30.65	
Independent	Alister Hammond	1,204	28.76	
Porirua Independents	Rosalie Kalolo	1,099	26.26	
Porirua Independents	Edward Richardson	981	23.44	
Independent	Frederick Bridgland	914	21.83	
Informal votes		11	0.26	
Majority		982	23.46	
Turnout		4,185		

==== Northern Ward ====
The Northern Ward elected five members to the Porirua City Council

Northern Ward
Party	Candidate	Votes	%	±%
Independent	Sue Dow	4,453	76.13	
Independent	Maureen Gillon	3,641	62.24	
Independent	Murray Woodhouse	3,616	61.82	
Independent	John Green	3,043	52.02	
Independent	Nick Leggett	2,650	45.30	
Porirua Independents	Jocelyn Anton	2,542	43.46	
Independent	Margaret Henderson	2,196	37.54	
Porirua Independents	Paul Crisp	2,156	36.86	
Porirua Independents	Pip Piper	2,045	34.96	
Green	Peter Phipps	1,559	26.65	
Porirua Independents	Gerald Atkinson	1,329	22.72	
Informal votes		16	0.27	
Majority		108	1.84	
Turnout		5,849		

==== Western Ward ====
The Western Ward elected three members to the Porirua City Council

Western Ward
Party	Candidate	Votes	%	±%
Labour	Bud Lavery	1,522	46.36	
Independent	Ken Douglas	1,471	44.80	
Independent	Helen Smith	1,219	37.13	
Independent	Tracey Waters	1,151	35.05	
Porirua Independents	Don Borrie	1,128	34.35	
Porirua Independents	William Arthur	763	23.24	
Labour	Philip O'Connell	716	21.80	
Porirua Independents	Graeme Ebbert	678	20.65	
Independent	Rosemary Hudson	470	14.31	
Independent	Wiremu Taurima	424	12.91	
Independent	Misilei Ioane	252	7.67	
Informal votes		56	1.70	
Majority		68	2.07	
Turnout		3,283		

== Other local elections ==
=== Wellington Regional Council ===
==== Porirua Ward ====
The Porirua Ward elected two members to the Wellington Regional Council

Porirua Ward
Party	Candidate	Votes	%	±%
Labour	Margaret Shields	10,100	78.62	+0.06
Independent	Robert Shaw	5,993	46.65	
Independent	Jim Gray	5,886	45.81	−4.02
Independent	Chris Kirk-Burnnand	3,712	28.89	
Majority		107	0.83	
Turnout		12,846		
