= 2001 Porirua mayoral election =

Local election in New Zealand

- 13 October 2001
- Turnout: 12,807 (42.80%) (Note: Turnout for the council voting)
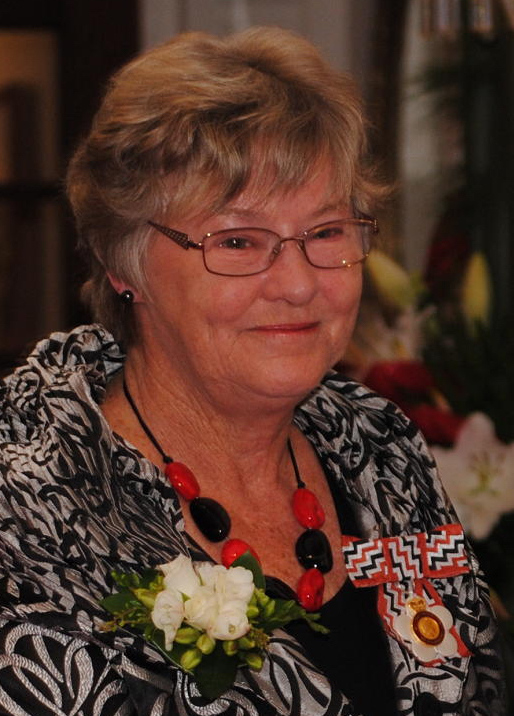
Candidate	Jenny Brash
Party	Independent
Popular vote	Elected unopposed
Mayor before election
Jenny Brash
Elected mayor
Jenny Brash

The 2001 Porirua mayoral election was part of the 2001 New Zealand local elections. The elections were held for the role of Mayor of Porirua plus other local government positions including thirteen city councillors, also elected triennially. This was the last Porirua mayoral election that used the First past the post method.

== Background ==
The incumbent Mayor, Jenny Brash, sought re-election for a second term. She was returned unopposed as no other candidates were nominated to stand against her. The Labour Party struggled to find a willing mayoral candidate. Initially it seemed as though councillor Ken Douglas would stand as its candidate, only to rule himself out of contention. By July only Brash had declared a mayoral candidacy. Eastern ward councillor David Stanley stated several people were considering seeking Labour Party's nomination, with former mayor John Burke being reported as among them. Several centre-right candidates including regional councillor Robert Shaw and Northern ward councillor Murray Woodhouse, replying to media questions, stated they were considering running. Both Burke and Shaw waited until the last minute before deciding not to run. It marked the first unopposed mayoral election to occur in Porirua since it was declared a borough in 1962.

== Ward results ==
Candidates were also elected from wards to the Porirua City Council.

Party/ticket	Councillors
Independent	7
Labour	6
