= 1986 Porirua City Council election =

The 1986 Porirua City Council election was part of the 1986 New Zealand local elections, to elect members to sub-national councils and boards. The polling was conducted using the first-past-the-post electoral method.

== Council ==
The Porirua City Council following the 1986 election consisted of a mayor and sixteen councillors elected from six wards (Pukerua Bay, Plimmerton-Paremata, Whitby, Ascot Park-Waitangirua, Cannons Creek and Titahi Bay).

=== Mayor ===
1986 Porirua mayoral election
Party	Candidate	Votes	%	±%
Labour	John Burke	4,458	62.12	+20.94
Independent	Charles Hudson	2,173	30.28	+7.12
Values	Neville McPherson	356	4.97	
Informal votes		189	2.63	+1.86
Majority		2,285	31.84	+19.87
Turnout		7,176	37.00	

==== Ward One, Pukerua Bay Ward ====
The Pukerua Bay Ward elected one member to the Porirua City Council

Pukerua Bay Ward
Party	Candidate	Votes	%	±%
Independent	Bill Taylor	unopposed		

==== Ward Two, Plimmerton-Paremata Ward ====
The Plimmerton-Paremata Ward elected three members to the Porirua City Council

Plimmerton-Paremata Ward
Party	Candidate	Votes	%	±%
Independent	Jenny Brash	1,323	90.74	+14.72
Independent	Jan Bennett	1,251	85.80	+13.61
Independent	Charles Hudson	1,172	80.38	−11.51
Independent	Colin Summers	593	40.67	
Informal votes		35	2.40	
Majority		579	39.71	
Turnout		1,458		

==== Ward Three, Whitby Ward ====
The Whitby Ward elected one member to the Porirua City Council

Pukerua Bay Ward
Party	Candidate	Votes	%	±%
Independent	Neville Peach	unopposed		

==== Ward Four, Ascot Park-Waitangirua ====
The Ascot Park-Waitangirua elected three members to the Porirua City Council

Tairangi Ward
Party	Candidate	Votes	%	±%
Labour	Matthew Nolan	587	86.07	
Labour	Pae Tuteru	576	84.45	
Labour	Kevin Watson	574	84.16	
Ind. New Deal	Tom Janes	281	41.20	
Informal votes		28	4.10	
Majority		293	42.96	
Turnout		682		

==== Ward Five, Cannons Creek Ward ====
The Cannons Creek Ward elected four members to the Porirua City Council

Cannons Creek Ward
Party	Candidate	Votes	%	±%
Labour	Moana Hereweni	1,082	82.03	
Labour	Geoff Walpole	993	75.28	+10.90
Labour	Jasmine Underhill	971	73.61	
Labour	Elaine Annandale	918	69.59	+10.45
Ind. New Deal	Margaret Brown	720	54.58	−16.34
Ind. New Deal	John Comber	531	40.25	
Informal votes		60	4.54	
Majority		198	15.01	
Turnout		1,319		

==== Ward Six, Titahi Bay Ward ====
The Titahi Bay Ward elected four members to the Porirua City Council

Titahi Bay Ward
Party	Candidate	Votes	%	±%
Independent	Maxine Arnold	1,181	63.32	+4.17
Labour	Phil White	1,064	57.05	
Values	Helen Smith	920	49.32	+3.23
Independent	Ivan Hardgrave	834	44.71	+12.96
Labour	Bud Lavery	770	41.28	
Labour	David Stanley	675	36.19	+8.03
Ind. New Deal	Eric McKenzie	550	29.49	−6.91
Independent	Ngapiki Arthur	482	25.84	
Independent	Alf Mexted	451	24.18	−3.36
Independent	Peter Windsor	432	23.16	
Informal votes		99	5.30	
Majority		64	3.43	
Turnout		1,865		

== Other local elections ==
=== Wellington Regional Council ===
==== Porirua/Tawa Ward ====
The Porirua/Tawa Ward elected two members to the Wellington Regional Council

Porirua Ward
Party	Candidate	Votes	%	±%
Independent	Maxine Arnold	6,919	64.70	+2.85
Labour	Ken Gray	5,694	53.24	
Labour	Don Borrie	4,213	39.39	
Independent	David Binnie	4,053	37.90	
Informal votes		507	4.74	
Majority		1,481	13.85	
Turnout		10,693		

=== Wellington Harbour Board ===
==== Porirua/Tawa Ward ====
The Porirua/Tawa Ward elected one member to the Wellington Harbour Board

Porirua/Tawa Ward
Party	Candidate	Votes	%	±%
Labour	Don Borrie	4,767	39.82	
Independent	Trevor Smith	4,179	34.90	
Independent	Mike Payze	1,717	14.34	
Informal votes		1,308	10.92	
Majority		588	4.91	
Turnout		11,971		

=== Wellington Hospital Board ===
==== Porirua/Tawa Ward ====
The Porirua/Tawa Ward elected two members to the Wellington Hospital Board

Porirua/Tawa Ward
Party	Candidate	Votes	%	±%
Labour	Don Borrie	unopposed		
Independent	Marion Bruce	unopposed		
