= 1986 Porirua mayoral election =

← 1983	11 October 1986	1989 →
- Turnout: 7,176 (37.00%)
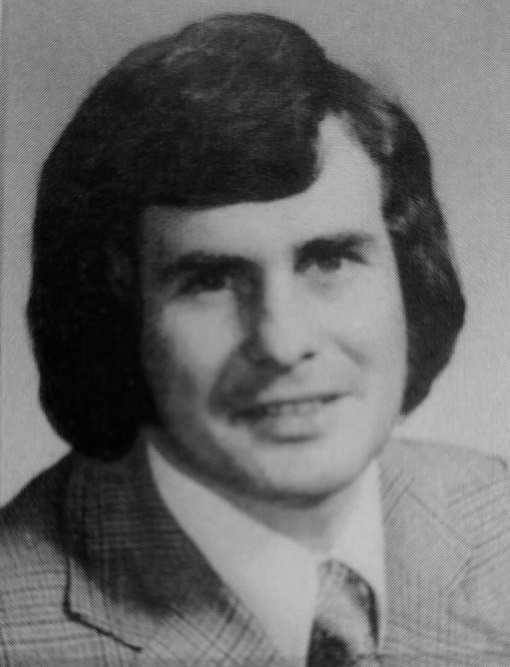

Candidate	John Burke	Charles Hudson
Party	Labour	Independent
Popular vote	4,458	2,173
Percentage	62.12	30.28
Mayor before election
John Burke
Elected mayor
John Burke

The 1986 Porirua mayoral election was part of the New Zealand local elections held that same year. The elections were held for the role of Mayor of Porirua plus other local government positions including sixteen city councillors, also elected triennially. The polling was conducted using the standard first-past-the-post electoral method.

== Background ==
The incumbent Mayor, John Burke, stood for a second term and was successful. He was re-elected by a comfortable margin over councillor Charles Hudson. Hudson was supported by an independent grouping campaigning for a "new deal" consisting of councillors Margaret Brown, Tom Janes and Eric McKenzie. The trio had left the Labour Party earlier in the year after a period of infighting from policy disagreements and set up their own ticket for the election. Labour won a working majority on the council while the new deal trio all failed to win re-election.

== Mayoral results ==
The following table gives the election results:

1986 Porirua mayoral election
Party	Candidate	Votes	%	±%
Labour	John Burke	4,458	62.12	+20.94
Independent	Charles Hudson	2,173	30.28	+7.12
Values	Neville McPherson	356	4.97	
Informal votes		189	2.63	+1.86
Majority		2,285	31.84	+19.87
Turnout		7,176	37.00	

== Ward results ==
Candidates were also elected from wards to the Porirua City Council.

Party/ticket	Councillors
Labour	8
Independent	7
Values	1
