= 1989 Porirua City Council election =

The 1989 Porirua City Council election was part of the 1989 New Zealand local elections, to elect members to sub-national councils and boards. The polling was conducted using the first-past-the-post electoral method.

== Council ==
The Porirua City Council following the 1989 election consisted of a mayor and thirteen councillors elected from five wards (Plimmerton, Horokiri, Titahi Bay, Tairangi and Cannons Creek). This was the first election since the Horokiwi riding of the Hutt County Council had been absorbed into Porirua in 1988.

=== Mayor ===
1989 Porirua mayoral election
Party	Candidate	Votes	%	±%
Labour	John Burke	8,991	64.58	+2.46
Independent	Ken Mair	4,131	29.67	
Informal votes		799	5.73	+3.10
Majority		4,860	34.91	+3.07
Turnout		13,921	56.00	+19.00

==== Ward One, Plimmerton ====
The Plimmerton ward elected two members to the Porirua City Council

Plimmerton Ward
Party	Candidate	Votes	%	±%
Independent	Jan Bennett	2,077	83.31	−2.49
Independent	Michael Brooks	1,654	66.34	
Independent	Raymond Young	1,107	44.40	
Informal votes		147	5.89	+3.49
Majority		547	21.94	
Turnout		2,493		

==== Ward Two, Horokiri ====
The Horokiri ward elected two members to the Porirua City Council

Horokiri Ward
Party	Candidate	Votes	%	±%
Independent	Murray Woodhouse	2,012	85.50	
Independent	Margaret Henderson	1,460	62.04	
Independent	Terence O'Connor	1,154	49.04	
Informal votes		79	3.35	
Majority		306	13.00	
Turnout		2,353		

==== Ward Three, Titahi Bay ====
The Titahi Bay ward elected three members to the Porirua City Council

Titahi Bay Ward
Party	Candidate	Votes	%	±%
Independent	Maxine Arnold	2,385	83.42	+20.10
Independent	Helen Smith	2,238	78.27	+28.95
Labour	Terewhiti Arthur	1,952	68.27	
Labour	Vernia Clark	1,827	63.90	
Informal votes		173	6.05	+0.75
Majority		125	4.37	
Turnout		2,859		

==== Ward Four, Tairangi ====
The Tairangi ward elected two members to the Porirua City Council

Tairangi Ward
Party	Candidate	Votes	%	±%
Labour	Philip Quinn	1,153	67.34	
Labour	Naureen Palmer	1,134	66.23	
Independent	Tino Meleisea	525	30.66	
Independent	Emily Siale	445	25.99	
Informal votes		127	7.41	
Majority		609	35.57	
Turnout		1,712		

==== Ward Five, Cannons Creek ====
The Cannons Creek ward elected four members to the Porirua City Council

Cannons Creek Ward
Party	Candidate	Votes	%	±%
Labour	Jasmine Underhill	1,980	74.40	+0.79
Labour	Geoff Walpole	1,944	73.05	−2.23
Labour	Elaine Annandale	1,889	70.98	+1.39
Labour	Charles Ford	1,771	66.55	
Independent	Dorothy Whiting	1,299	48.81	
Independent	Roy Hollands	847	31.83	
Independent	Mikaele Kelekolio	776	29.16	
Informal votes		138	5.18	+0.64
Majority		472	17.73	
Turnout		2,661		

== Other local elections ==
=== Wellington Regional Council ===
==== Porirua Ward ====
The Porirua Ward elected two members to the Wellington Regional Council

Porirua Ward
Party	Candidate	Votes	%	±%
Labour	Ken Gray	8,351	65.35	+12.11
Independent	Maxine Arnold	7,084	55.44	−9.26
Labour	Don Borrie	6,663	52.14	+12.75
Independent	Ron England	2,786	21.80	
Informal votes		669	5.23	−0.49
Majority		421	3.29	
Turnout		12,777		

=== Wellington Area Health Board ===
==== Porirua Ward ====
The Porirua Ward elected one member to the Wellington Area Health Board

Porirua Ward
Party	Candidate	Votes	%	±%
Independent	Marion Bruce	6,792	48.78	
Labour	Don Borrie	6,277	45.09	
Informal votes		852	6.12	
Majority		515	3.69	
Turnout		13,921		
