= 1989 Porirua mayoral election =

← 1986	14 October 1989	1992 →
- Turnout: 13,921 (56.00%)
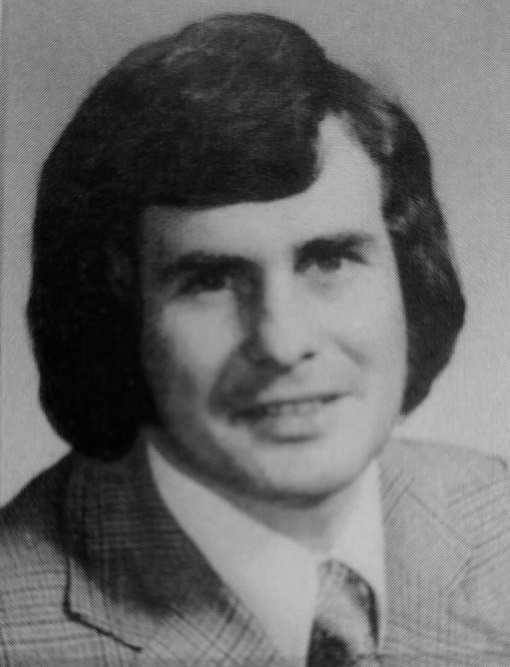

Candidate	John Burke	Ken Mair
Party	Labour	Independent
Popular vote	8,991	4,131
Percentage	64.58	29.67
Mayor before election
John Burke
Elected mayor
John Burke

The 1989 Porirua mayoral election was part of the New Zealand local elections held that same year. The elections were held for the role of Mayor of Porirua plus other local government positions including thirteen city councillors, also elected triennially. The polling was conducted using the standard first-past-the-post electoral method.

== Background ==
The 1989 local elections were the first following a major overhaul of local government in New Zealand. The Horokiwi riding of the Hutt County Council had been absorbed into Porirua in 1988.

The incumbent Mayor, John Burke, stood for a third term and was successful. He was re-elected by a comfortable margin of over 4,000 votes over Ken Mair, an activist. Mair said he was surprised by how many votes he received and he was "only testing the water" in standing. Media speculated that the level of votes against Labour were reflective of public mood against the policies of the Fourth Labour Government, rather than about local issues. Labour still won a narrow majority of seats on the council.

== Mayoral results ==
The following table gives the election results:

1989 Porirua mayoral election
Party	Candidate	Votes	%	±%
Labour	John Burke	8,991	64.58	+2.46
Independent	Ken Mair	4,131	29.67	
Informal votes		799	5.73	+3.10
Majority		4,860	34.91	+3.07
Turnout		13,921	56.00	+19.00

== Ward results ==
Candidates were also elected from wards to the Porirua City Council.

Party/ticket	Councillors
Labour	7
Independent	6
