= 2004 Porirua mayoral election =

Election in New Zealand

- 9 October 2004
- Turnout: 17,632 (42.70%)
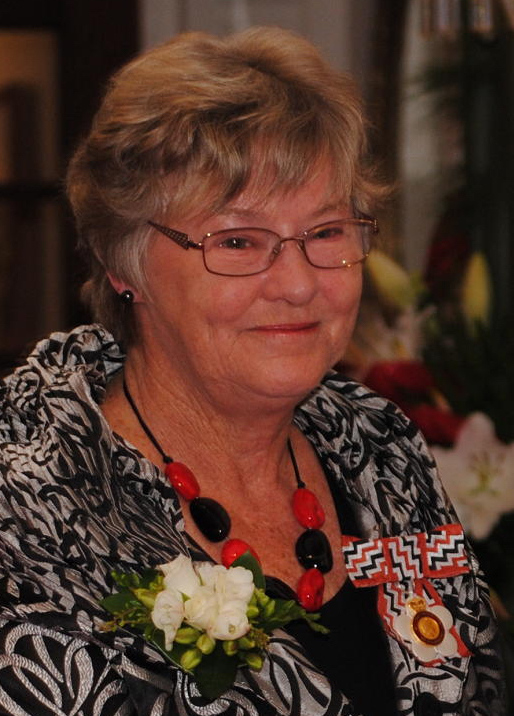

Candidate	Jenny Brash	Gregory Fortuin	Kevin Watson
Party	Independent	Independent	Labour
Popular vote	7,156	4,442	2,561
Percentage	40.58	25.19	14.52
Mayor before election
Jenny Brash
Elected mayor
Jenny Brash

The 2004 Porirua mayoral election was part of the 2004 New Zealand local elections. The elections were held for the role of Mayor of Porirua plus other local government positions including thirteen city councillors, also elected triennially. This was the first Porirua mayoral election to be held under the Single transferable vote voting system.

== Background ==
The incumbent Mayor, Jenny Brash, sought re-election for a third term. After winning a second term uncontested, she was opposed deputy mayor Kevin Watson, councillor Robert Shaw, former Race Relations Conciliator Gregory Fortuin, real estate manager Euon Murrell and teacher Paul Hopkinson, who had come to national attention in 2003 after burning a New Zealand flag during a protest against the Iraq War. Councillor John Green contemplated running while councillor Ken Douglas ruled it out, but ran for re-election to the council having changed his allegiance from independent to the Labour Party. Porirua business leaders attempted to convince Mark Blumsky, the former Mayor of Wellington to stand, but he could not be persuaded.

Watson only finished third and lost his council seat in a shock result. The final election result declaration was delayed by 17 days after a computer glitch left 10 percent of all votes cast uncounted.

== Mayoral results ==
The following table gives the final iteration (fifth) of the election results:

2004 Porirua mayoral election
Party	Candidate	Votes	%	±%
Independent	Jenny Brash	7,156	40.58	
Independent	Gregory Fortuin	4,442	25.19	
Labour	Kevin Watson	2,561	14.52	
Independent	Euon Murrell	1,726	9.78	
Independent	Robert Shaw	1,295	7.34	
Anti-Capitalist Alliance	Paul Hopkinson	126	0.71	
Informal votes		326	1.84	
Majority		2,714	15.39	
Turnout		17,632	42.70	−0.10

== Ward results ==
Candidates were also elected from wards to the Porirua City Council.

Party/ticket	Councillors
Independent	8
Labour	5
