= 1992 Porirua City Council election =

The 1992 Porirua City Council election was part of the 1992 New Zealand local elections, to elect members to sub-national councils and boards. The polling was conducted using the first-past-the-post electoral method.

== Council ==
The Porirua City Council following the 1992 election consisted of a mayor and thirteen councillors elected from five wards (Plimmerton, Horokiri, Titahi Bay, Tairangi and Cannons Creek).

=== Mayor ===
1992 Porirua mayoral election
Party	Candidate	Votes	%	±%
Labour	John Burke	8,606	59.32	−5.26
Independent	Don Borrie	5,377	37.06	
Informal votes		523	3.60	−2.13
Majority		3,229	22.25	−12.66
Turnout		14,506		

==== Ward One, Plimmerton ====
The Plimmerton ward elected two members to the Porirua City Council

Plimmerton Ward
Party	Candidate	Votes	%	±%
Independent	Robert Shaw	1,474	56.32	
Independent	Jenny Brash	1,385	52.92	
Independent	Russell Marshall	1,199	45.81	
Independent	Jan Bennett	1,091	41.68	−41.63
Informal votes		84	3.20	−2.69
Majority		186	7.10	
Turnout		2,617		

==== Ward Two, Horokiri ====
The Horokiri ward elected two members to the Porirua City Council

Horokiri Ward
Party	Candidate	Votes	%	±%
Independent	Murray Woodhouse	2,138	86.66	+1.16
Independent	Lynne Thomas	1,576	63.88	
Independent	John Green	1,113	45.11	
Informal votes		107	4.33	+0.98
Majority		463	18.76	
Turnout		2,467		

==== Ward Three, Titahi Bay ====
The Titahi Bay ward elected three members to the Porirua City Council

Titahi Bay Ward
Party	Candidate	Votes	%	±%
Independent	Helen Smith	1,756	53.71	−24.56
Labour	Terewhiti Arthur	1,672	51.14	−17.13
Independent	Don Borrie	1,586	48.51	
Labour	Gwyn Skinner	1,379	42.18	
Independent	Kim Arnold	1,356	41.48	
Independent	Henry Sharman	1,016	31.07	
Independent	Peter Windsor	961	29.39	
Informal votes		80	2.44	−3.61
Majority		207	6.33	
Turnout		3,269		

==== Ward Four, Tairangi ====
The Tairangi ward elected two members to the Porirua City Council

Tairangi Ward
Party	Candidate	Votes	%	±%
Labour	Lua Lepaio	1,143	65.95	
Labour	Naureen Palmer	1,127	65.03	−1.20
Independent	Rita Magson	516	29.77	
Independent	Josephine Lancaster	362	20.88	
Independent	Rosalie Kalolo	249	14.36	
Informal votes		68	3.92	−3.49
Majority		611	35.25	
Turnout		1,733		

==== Ward Five, Cannons Creek ====
The Cannons Creek ward elected four members to the Porirua City Council

Cannons Creek Ward
Party	Candidate	Votes	%	±%
Labour	Jasmine Underhill	2,525	89.25	+14.85
Labour	Geoff Walpole	2,221	78.50	+5.45
Labour	Charles Ford	2,206	77.97	+11.42
Labour	Elenuipo Matagi	1,477	52.20	
Independent	Taleni Tanieluy	1,104	39.02	
Independent	David Leggott	1,060	37.46	
Independent	Luta Gaualofa	629	22.23	
Informal votes		93	3.28	−1.90
Majority		373	13.18	
Turnout		2,829		

== Other local elections ==
=== Wellington Regional Council - Porirua Ward ===
The Porirua Ward elected two members to the Wellington Regional Council

Porirua Ward
Party	Candidate	Votes	%	±%
Labour	Ken Gray	9,410	75.24	+9.89
Independent	Maxine Arnold	7,896	63.14	+7.70
Labour	Barbara Brooks (Note: Brooks was appointed to the council on 16 February 1993 to replace Ken Gray who died on 18 November 1992)	6,863	54.88	
Informal votes		841	6.72	+1.49
Majority		1,033	8.26	
Turnout		12,505		

Table footnotes:
