= Gregory Fortuin =

New Zealand public servant

Race Relations Conciliator
- In office April 2001 – October 2002

Personal details
- Born: South Africa
- Occupation: Businessman; political

Gregory Fortuin was born in South Africa and has had business and political experience there and in Australia and New Zealand.

In 1998 he was appointed by Nelson Mandela as honorary consul to New Zealand.

From April 2001 to October 2002 he was New Zealand's race relations conciliator. During this time he became embroiled in negative publicity, surrounding his attempt to enter the Wellington Club while not wearing a tie, which was in breach of the club's dress code. Eventually, he conceded that his behaviour during the incident was inappropriate.

He has been praised by Jim Bolger, former National Party prime minister, and Ken Douglas, former president of the New Zealand Council of Trade Unions.

Fortuin is also named a director of a group of risk management companies owned by the Accident Compensation Corporation in New Zealand.

At the 2004 mayoral election Fortuin stood as a candidate for mayor of Porirua. He finished runner up to incumbent mayor Jenny Brash.
