= 1995 Porirua City Council election =

- 14 October 1995
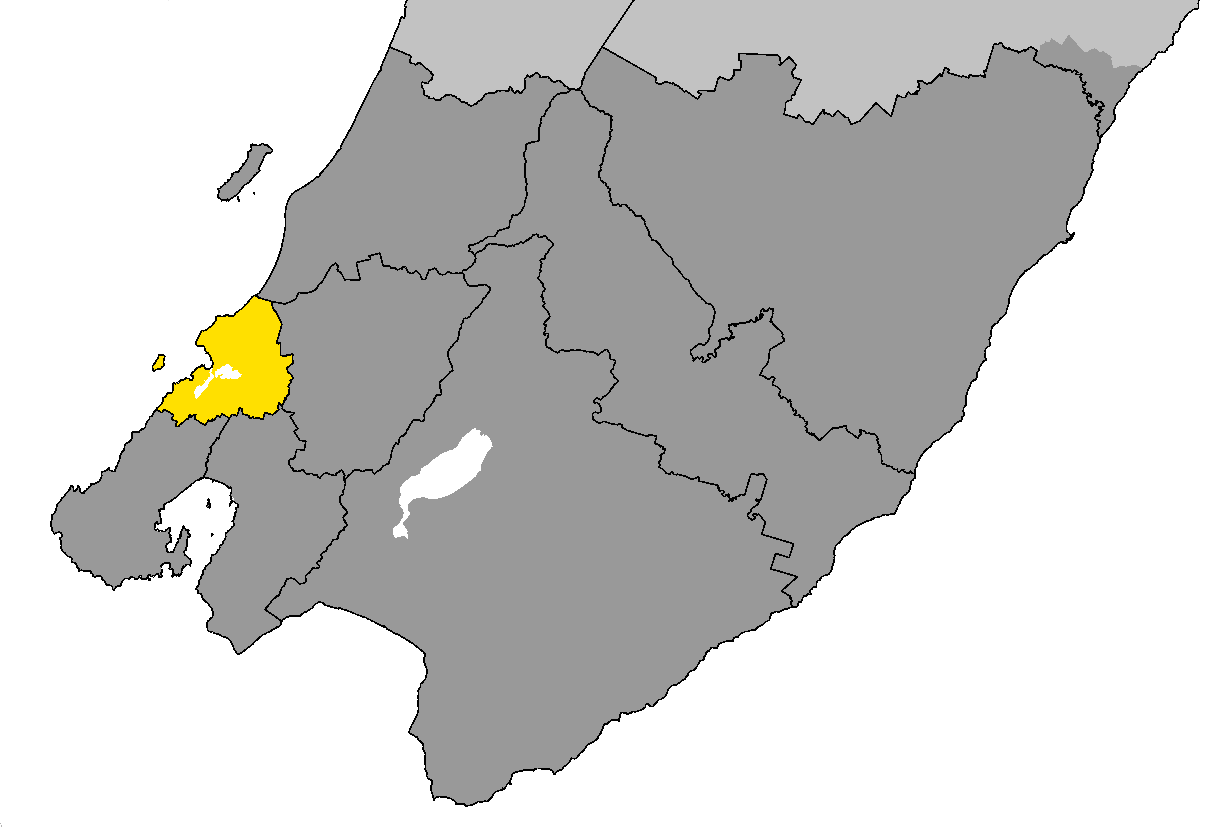
- Position of Porirua City within Wellington Region

The 1995 Porirua City Council election was part of the 1995 New Zealand local elections, to elect members to sub-national councils and boards. The polling was conducted using the first-past-the-post electoral method.

== Council ==
The Porirua City Council following the 1995 election consisted of a mayor and thirteen councillors elected from five wards (Plimmerton, Horokiri, Titahi Bay, Tairangi and Cannons Creek).

=== Mayor ===
1995 Porirua mayoral election
Party	Candidate	Votes	%	±%
Labour	John Burke	6,156	40.33	−18.99
Independent	Robert Shaw	3,849	25.21	
Independent	Jenny Brash	3,595	23.55	
Independent	Tino Meleisea	1,185	7.76	
McGillicuddy Serious	Grant Prankerd	210	1.37	
Informal votes		269	1.76	−1.84
Majority		2,307	15.11	−7.14
Turnout		15,264	46.00	−8.00

==== Ward One, Plimmerton ====
The Plimmerton ward elected two members to the Porirua City Council

Plimmerton Ward
Party	Candidate	Votes	%	±%
Independent	Robert Shaw	1,674	52.18	−4.14
Independent	Sue Dow	1,323	41.24	
Labour	Philip Quinn	1,200	37.40	
Independent	Bill Taylor	859	26.77	
Independent	Valerie Pearson	716	22.31	
Independent	Paul Crisp	584	18.20	
Informal votes		59	1.83	−1.37
Majority		123	3.83	
Turnout		3,208		

==== Ward Two, Horokiri ====
The Horokiri ward elected two members to the Porirua City Council

Horokiri Ward
Party	Candidate	Votes	%	±%
Independent	Murray Woodhouse	1,863	57.76	−28.90
Independent	Lynne Thomas	1,702	52.77	−11.11
Independent	John Green	1,422	44.09	−1.02
Independent	Margaret Henderson	1,320	40.93	
Informal votes		142	4.40	+0.07
Majority		280	8.68	−10.08
Turnout		3,225		

==== Ward Three, Titahi Bay ====
The Titahi Bay ward elected three members to the Porirua City Council

Titahi Bay Ward
Party	Candidate	Votes	%	±%
Independent	Helen Smith	1,744	55.96	+2.25
Labour	Bud Lavery	1,662	53.33	
Independent	Don Borrie	1,573	50.48	+1.97
Labour	Terewhiti Arthur	1,566	50.25	−0.89
Independent	Graeme Ebbett	1,388	44.54	
Independent	Peter Windsor	885	28.40	−0.99
Independent	Afoa Elisara	468	14.01	
Informal votes		60	1.92	−0.52
Majority		7	0.22	
Turnout		3,116		

==== Ward Four, Tairangi ====
The Tairangi ward elected two members to the Porirua City Council

Tairangi Ward
Party	Candidate	Votes	%	±%
Labour	Naureen Palmer	1,114	79.06	+14.03
Labour	Kevin Watson	997	70.75	
Independent	Le'autuli Sauvao	655	46.48	
Informal votes		51	3.61	−0.31
Majority		342	24.27	
Turnout		1,409		

==== Ward Five, Cannons Creek ====
The Cannons Creek ward elected four members to the Porirua City Council

Cannons Creek Ward
Party	Candidate	Votes	%	±%
Labour	Jasmine Underhill	1,588	75.22	−14.03
Labour	Geoff Walpole	1,464	69.35	−9.15
Labour	David Stanley	1,393	65.98	
Labour	Lua Lepaio	1,313	62.19	
Independent	Papali'i Tanielu	697	33.01	
Independent	Elizabeth Lee-Lo	445	21.08	
Independent	Elenuipo Matagi	353	16.72	−35.48
Independent	Manusina Finau	340	16.10	
Informal votes		849	40.21	+36.93
Majority		616	29.18	
Turnout		2,111		

== Other local elections ==
=== Wellington Regional Council - Porirua Ward ===
The Porirua Ward elected two members to the Wellington Regional Council

Porirua Ward
Party	Candidate	Votes	%	±%
Labour	Margaret Shields	10,062	78.56	
Independent	Jim Gray	6,383	49.83	
Labour	Barbara Donaldson	5,787	45.18	−9.70
Independent	Kenneth Betteridge	3,383	26.41	
Majority		596	4.65	
Turnout		12,808		
