= 1995 Porirua mayoral election =

- 14 October 1995
- Turnout: 15,264 (46.00%)
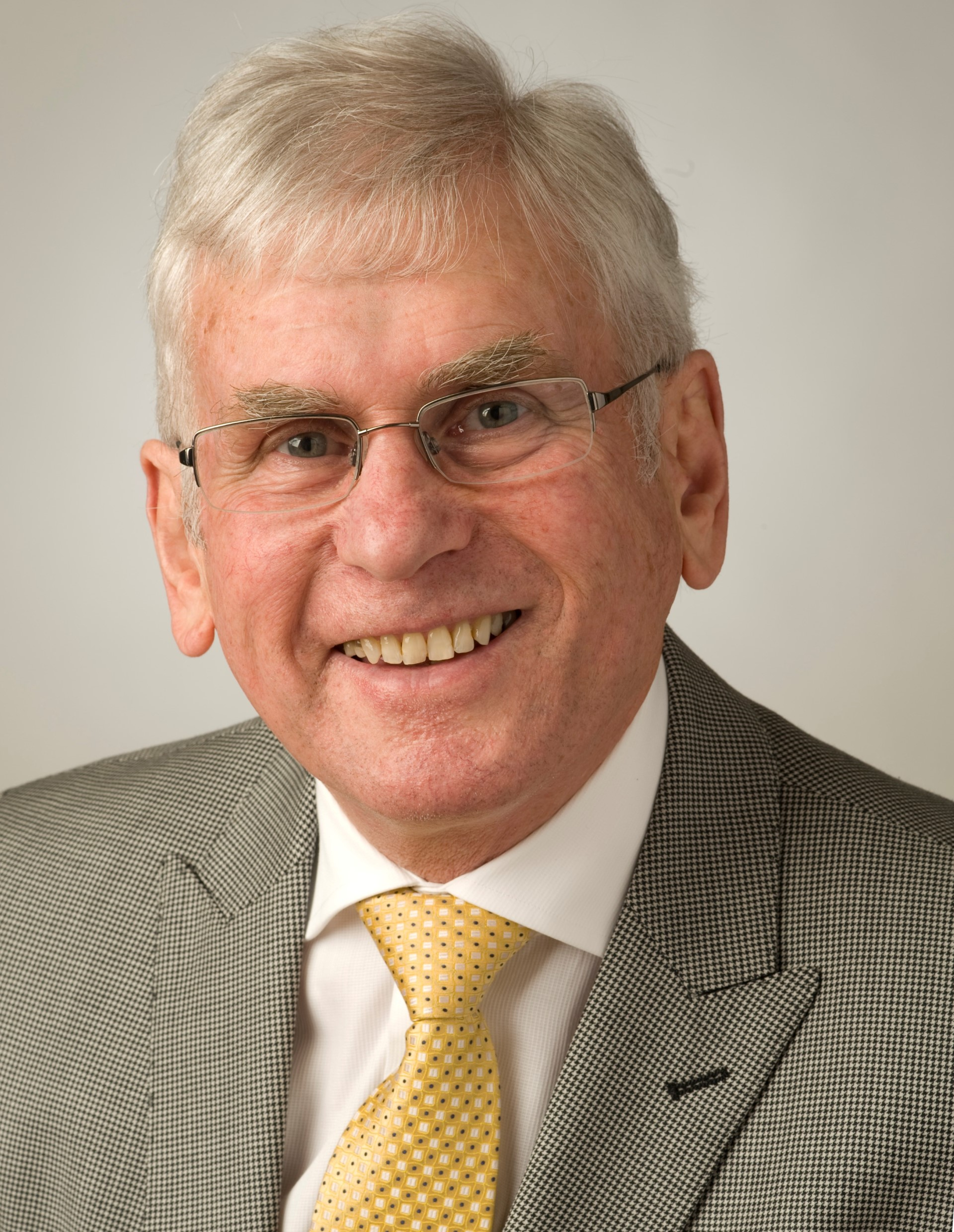

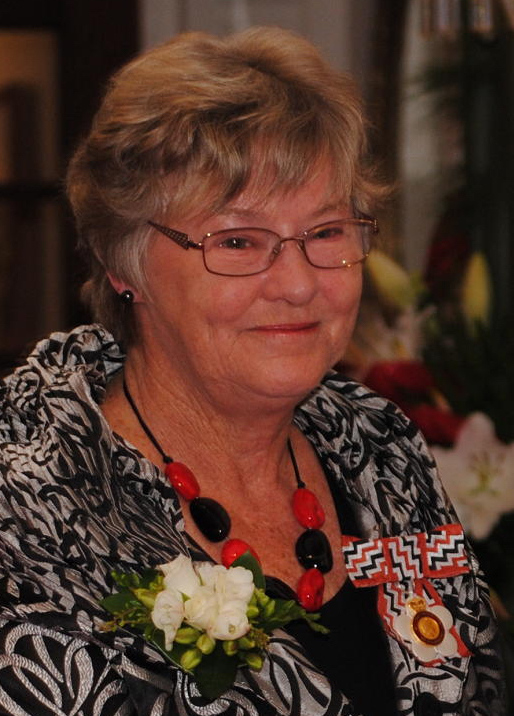
Candidate	John Burke	Robert Shaw	Jenny Brash
Party	Labour	Independent	Independent
Popular vote	6,156	3,849	3,595
Percentage	40.33	25.21	23.55
Mayor before election
John Burke
Elected mayor
John Burke

The 1995 Porirua mayoral election was part of the New Zealand local elections held that same year. The elections were held for the role of Mayor of Porirua plus other local government positions including thirteen city councillors, also elected triennially. The polling was conducted using the standard first-past-the-post electoral method.

== Background ==
The incumbent Mayor, John Burke, stood for a fifth term and was successful. He was opposed by two Plimmerton ward councillors Robert Shaw and Jenny Brash. Both split the vote against Burke polling over a thousand votes higher than Burke between them. Shaw was re-elected to the council, but Brash stood only for the mayoralty. The election was noted for high spending with Shaw spending $20,000 on his campaign causing Burke to spend more than he "would have preferred." In the Cannons Creek ward there was an error with some ballot papers which erroneously stated to vote for five candidates instead of four. There was a higher than normal number of informal votes as a result.

== Mayoral results ==
The following table gives the election results:

1995 Porirua mayoral election
Party	Candidate	Votes	%	±%
Labour	John Burke	6,156	40.33	−18.99
Independent	Robert Shaw	3,849	25.21	
Independent	Jenny Brash	3,595	23.55	
Independent	Tino Meleisea	1,185	7.76	
McGillicuddy Serious	Grant Prankerd	210	1.37	
Informal votes		269	1.76	−1.84
Majority		2,307	15.11	−7.14
Turnout		15,264	46.00	−8.00

== Ward results ==
Candidates were also elected from wards to the Porirua City Council.

Party/ticket	Councillors
Labour	7
Independent	6
