= Taylor-Stace Cottage =

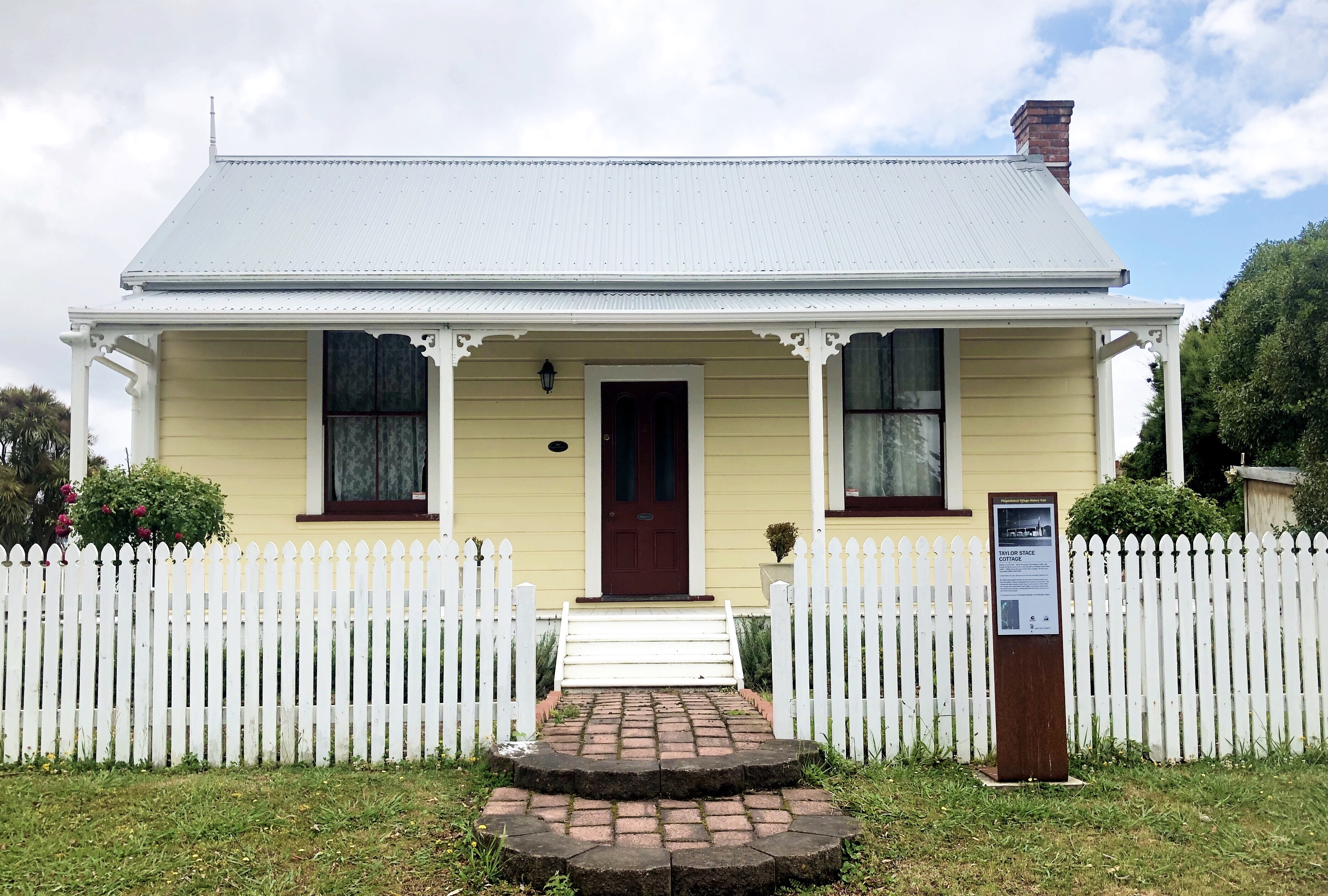

General information
- Type: Cottage
- Location: Pāuatahanui, Wellington, New Zealand
- Coordinates: 41°06′25″S 174°54′57″E
- Completed: 1847

Technical details
- Floor area: 80m²

Heritage New Zealand – Category 1
- Official name: Taylor-Stace Cottage
- Designated: 1986
- Reference no.: 4108

Taylor-Stace Cottage, built in 1847, is the oldest surviving house of European origin in the Wellington region of New Zealand. The cottage is classified as a Category I historic place (a place of "special or outstanding historical or cultural heritage significance or value") by the New Zealand Historic Places Trust. Taylor-Stace Cottage was built by immigrants William and Anne Taylor, who had come to New Zealand in 1840.

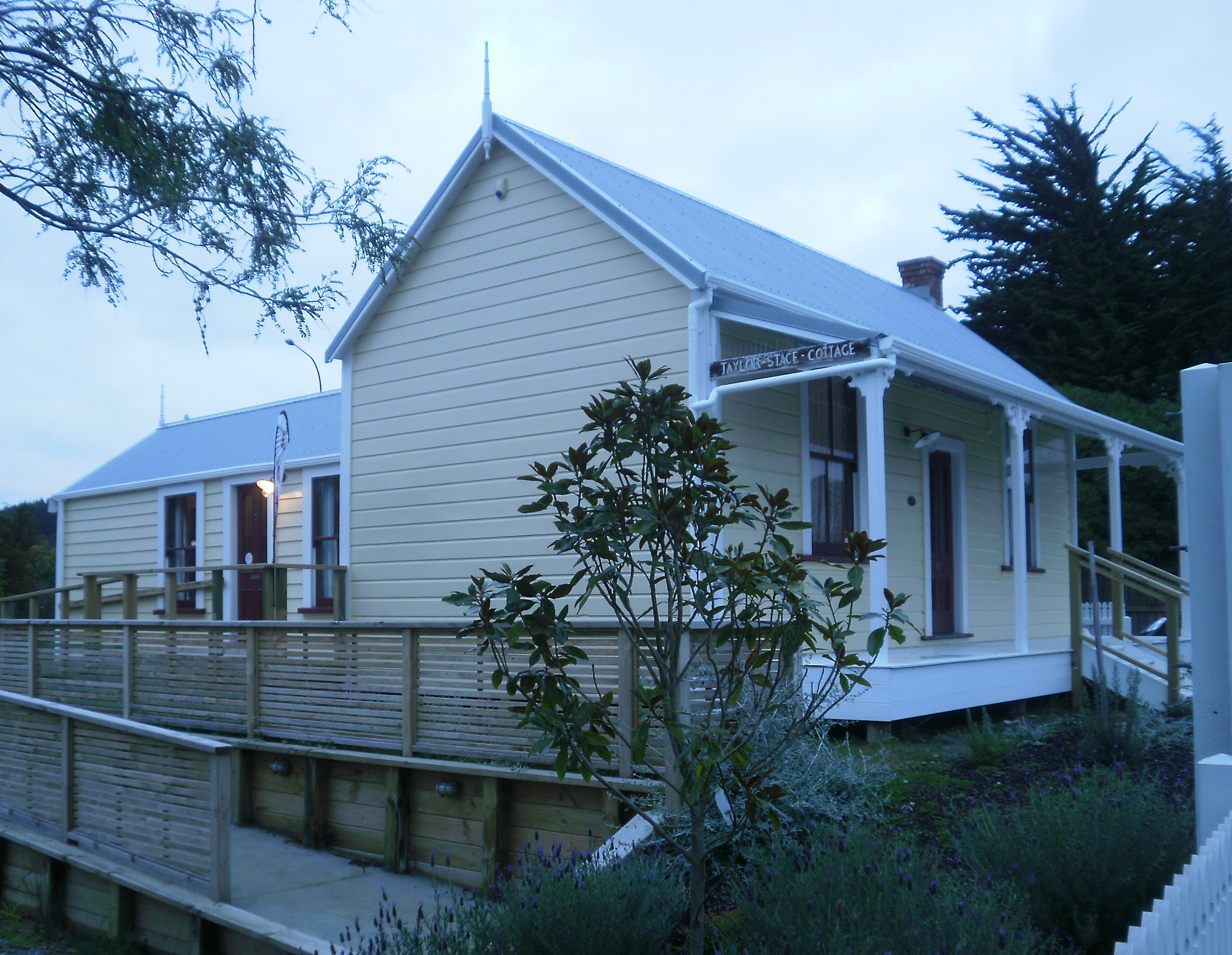

The back portion of the cottage was completed in 1847 and was sold to Alfred Stace the following year. It's debated whether the front part of the cottage was built during the 1850s or in 1906 after the Stace family moved on.

During the 1970s the cottage was used as a craft gallery, and in the 2000s it was an art gallery for a couple of years.

In 2010 and 2011 combined funding and effort by the new owners, Porirua City Council and the New Zealand Historic Places Trust, saw the cottage restored and raised to protect it from flooding. Its current use is as a beauty salon.
