= 2010 Greater Wellington Regional Council election =

Part of the 2010 New Zealand local elections

← 2007	9 October 2010	2013 →
- Position of Greater Wellington within New Zealand

The 2010 Wellington Region local elections were part of the 2010 New Zealand local elections, to elect members to sub-national councils and boards. These elections covered the Wellington Region council (known as the Greater Wellington Regional Council), eight territorial authority (city and district) councils, three district health boards, and various community boards and licensing trusts.

As per the Local Electoral Act 2001, all the elections occurred on Saturday 9 October 2010. Voting was carried out by postal ballot, using one of two voting systems: Single Transferable Vote for the district health boards and three of the territorial authority councils, and First Past The Post for the remaining territorial authority councils, the regional council, and all the local boards and trusts.

== Greater Wellington Regional Council ==
The Greater Wellington Regional Council (GWRC) is the regional council covering the whole Wellington Region. It represents a population of 478,600 as of the Statistics New Zealand's June 2009 estimate, and consists of thirteen councillors elected from six constituencies (Wellington, Lower Hutt, Porirua-Tawa, Kāpiti Coast, Upper Hutt, Wairarapa) using the First Past The Post voting system.

=== Wellington constituency ===
The Wellington constituency returns five members to the GWRC. At the close of nominations at 12 noon on 20 August 2010, the candidates nominated for the Wellington constituency were:

Name	Affiliation (if any)	Notes
Judith Aitken		Incumbent
Sally Baber		Incumbent
Paul Bruce	Green	Incumbent
Dianne Buchan	Independent	
Charles Finny		
Michael Gibson	REFORM	
Chris Laidlaw	Independent	Incumbent
Chris Lipscombe	Labour	
Terry McDavitt	Independent	
Daran Ponter	Labour	
Bill Rainey	Independent	
Fran Wilde	Independent	Incumbent, Regional Council Chair

=== Lower Hutt constituency ===
Greater Wellington Regional Council Lower Hutt constituency councillor election, 2010
Party	Candidate	Votes	%	±%
	Peter Glensor	15,600		
	Sandra Greig	14,643		
	Prue Lamason	13,866		
	John Terris	12,640		
	Rose Thomas	10,001		

=== Porirua-Tawa constituency ===
The Porirua-Tawa constituency returns two members to the GWRC. At the close of nominations, the candidates nominated for the Porirua-Tawa constituency were:

Name	Affiliation (if any)	Notes
Jenny Brash	Independent	Current Porirua City Council mayor
John Burke	Independent	Incumbent
Barbara Donaldson		Incumbent
Pat Hanley	Independent	

=== Kāpiti Coast constituency ===
One member from the Kapiti constituency was elected to GWRC. Incumbent Nigel Wilson retained the seat against former Kāpiti Coast District councillor Ann Chapman.

Greater Wellington Regional Council Kapiti Coast constituency councillor election, 2010
Party	Candidate	Votes	%	±%
	Nigel Wilson	8427	54.69	+46.31
	Ann Chapman	6982	45.31	
Turnout		15,409		

=== Upper Hutt constituency ===
Greater Wellington Regional Council Upper Hutt constituency councillor election, 2010
Party	Candidate	Votes	%	±%
	Paul Swain	5079	42.52	
	Rex Kirton	3764	31.51	
	Stephanie Lambert	1946	16.29	
	Alan Jefferies	1155	9.67	
Turnout		11,994		

=== Wairarapa constituency ===
One member from the Wairarapa constituency was elected to GWRC. Former Carterton District Council mayor Gary McPhee won the constituency, defeating incumbent Ian Buchannan.

Greater Wellington Regional Council Wairarapa constituency councillor election, 2010
Party	Candidate	Votes	%	±%
	Gary McPhee	6644	44.15	
	Ian Buchannan	5937	39.45	−37.11
	Perry Cameron	2467	16.39	−32.69
Turnout		15,048		
