= Mike Tana =

New Zealand politician and trade union leader

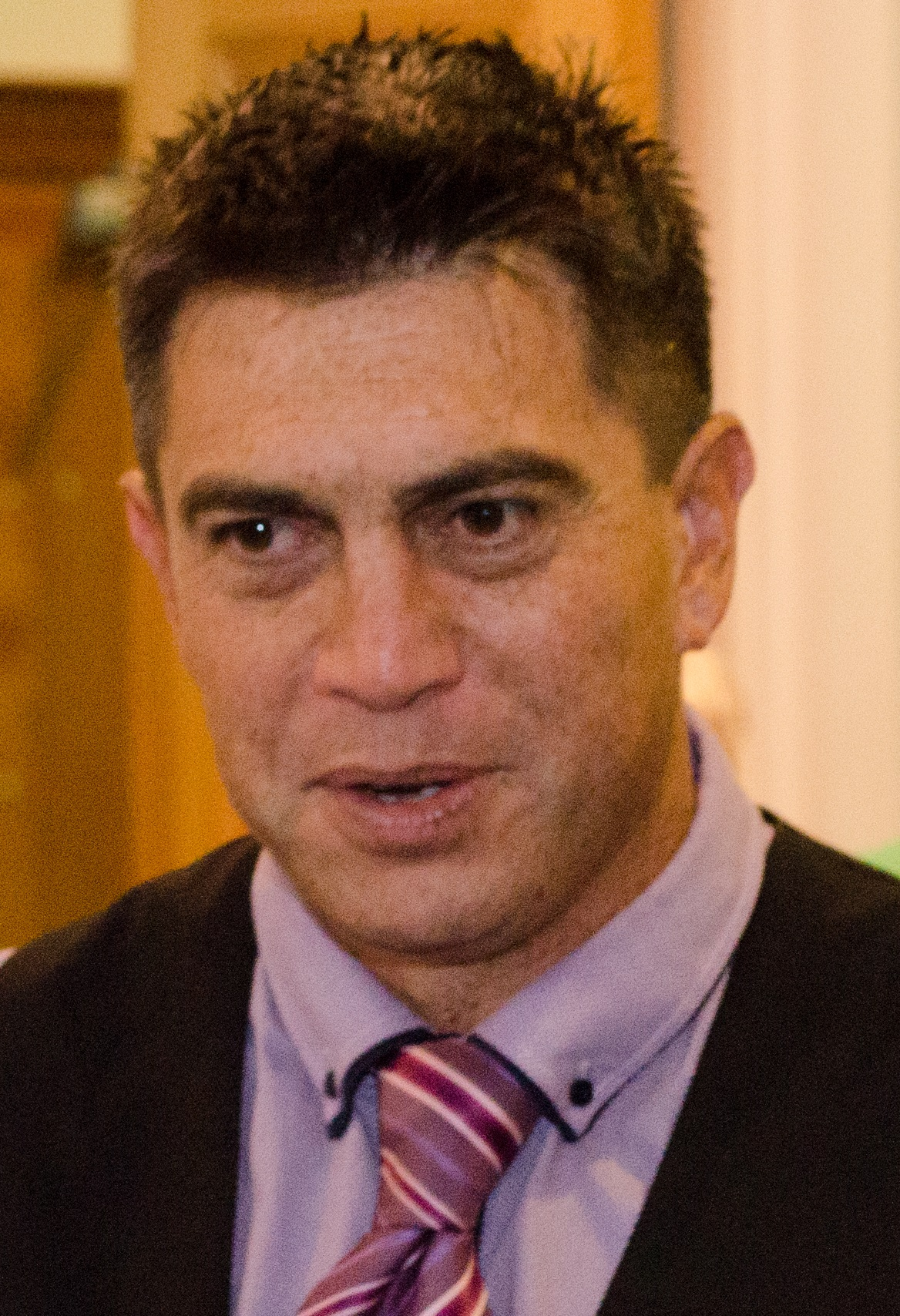

5th Mayor of Porirua
- In office 26 October 2016 – 30 October 2019
- Deputy: Izzy Ford
- Preceded by: Nick Leggett
- Succeeded by: Anita Baker

Personal details
- Born: 1965 or 1966 (age 59–60) Matakohe, New Zealand
- Spouse: Toni
- Children: 6

Michael Darren Tana (born 1965 or 1966) is a New Zealand politician and trade union leader. He was mayor of Porirua from 2016 to 2019.

== Early life ==
Tana is from Matakohe, near Ruawai in the Northland region. His iwi are Ngāti Whātua and Ngāpuhi.

He has an agricultural science degree from Massey University.

== Career ==
He has been senior biosecurity adviser at the Ministry for Primary Industries, and the president of the 62,000-strong Public Service Association.

=== Career in politics ===
He announced in August 2016 that he would be running for Mayor of Porirua and he ran a poorly-funded campaign. Tana won the 2016 mayoral election, receiving 5,887 votes (after other candidates were eliminated on the STV ballot). He was the first Māori mayor of Porirua, and one of only a small number of Māori mayors in New Zealand history.

Tana grew up experiencing racism, and when he was elected Mayor he joined Porirua City up to an anti-racism campaign.

Tana ran for Mayor again in the 2019 local elections but failed to win re-election, instead coming in 2nd place behind Anita Baker.

== Personal life ==
Tana has six children with his wife Toni.

Political offices
Preceded by Nick Leggett	Mayor of Porirua; 2016–2019	Succeeded by Anita Baker
