= 1983 Porirua mayoral election =

- 8 October 1983
- Turnout: 13,092
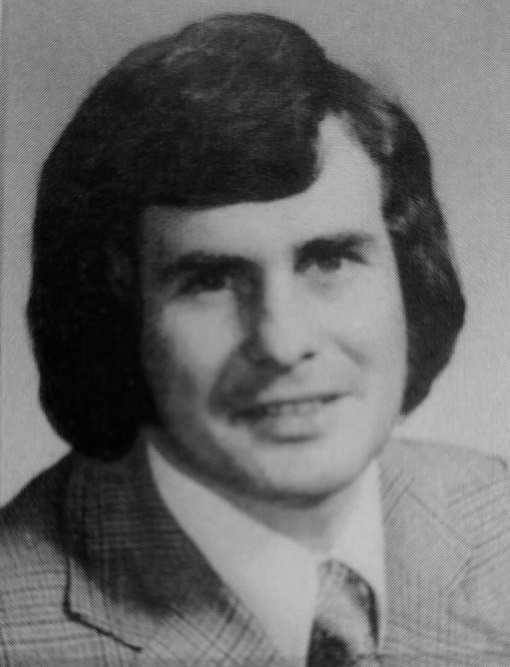

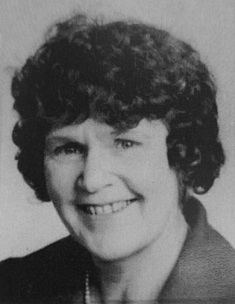
Candidate	John Burke	Maxine Arnold
Party	Labour	Independent
Popular vote	5,392	3,824
Percentage	41.18	29.20
Mayor before election
Whitford Brown
Elected mayor
John Burke

The 1983 Porirua mayoral election was part of the New Zealand local elections held that same year. The elections were held for the role of Mayor of Porirua plus other local government positions including sixteen city councillors, also elected triennially. The polling was conducted using the standard first-past-the-post electoral method.

== Background ==
The incumbent Mayor, Whitford Brown, retired after 21 years leaving an open race. The deputy mayor John Burke was elected over councillor Maxine Arnold, though the Labour ticket he led failed to regain a majority with the council having a majority of independent councillors.

Electoral reforms were implemented at the 1983 municipal elections, the method of electing councillors at large which had been used in Porirua since 1962 was replaced with a ward system of local electoral districts. Wards had been used for areas absorbed into the city since then in both Taupo and Pukerua Bay from 1974 with the rest elected at large.

== Mayoral results ==
The following table gives the election results:

1983 Porirua mayoral election
Party	Candidate	Votes	%	±%
Labour	John Burke	5,392	41.18	
Independent	Maxine Arnold	3,824	29.20	
Independent	Charles Hudson	3,033	23.16	
Mana Motuhake	Mark Metekingi	742	5.66	
Informal votes		101	0.77	−0.33
Majority		1,568	11.97	
Turnout		13,092		

== Ward results ==
Candidates were also elected from wards to the Porirua City Council.

Party/ticket	Councillors
Independent	9
Labour	6
Values	1
