= 2025 Porirua City Council election =

- 11 October 2025
- Turnout: 17,623 (40.95% ▲3.61 pp)
- Mayor
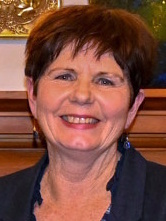
		Ind	Ind
Candidate	Anita Baker	Kathleen Filo	Ura Wilson-Pokoati
Party	Independent	Independent	Independent
Primary vote	8,517	7,225	1,565
Percentage	48.33%	41.00%	8.88%
Final vote	8,935	8,033	excluded
Percentage	52.60%	47.29%
Mayor before election
Anita Baker
Independent
Elected mayor
Anita Baker
Independent
- Councillors
- 10 seats on the governing body of Porirua City Council; 6 seats needed for a majority
Party	Seats	+/–
Independent	8	0
Labour	2	0
This lists parties that won seats. See the complete results below.
Control before	Control after
No majority	No majority

The 2025 Porirua City Council election was a local election held from 9 September to 11 October in Porirua, New Zealand, as part of that year's territorial authority elections and other local elections held nation-wide.

Voters elected the mayor of Porirua and 10 city councillors for the 2025–2028 term of the Porirua City Council. Postal voting and the single transferable vote system were used.

Incumbent mayor Anita Baker won re-election to a third term.

The council introduced a Māori ward at the 2022 election; in a referendum on its future held at this election (as part of a nation-wide series of referendums) voters elected to keep the Māori ward.

A majority of voters also voted in favour of exploring amalgamation with the Wellington, Lower Hutt, Upper Hutt and Greater Wellington councils, in an indicative poll on the issue.

== Key dates ==
- 4 July 2025: Nominations for candidates opened
- 1 August 2025: Nominations for candidates closed at 12 pm
- 9 September 2025: Voting documents were posted and voting opened
- 11 October 2025: Voting closed at 12 pm and progress/preliminary results were published
- 16–19 October 2025: Final results were declared.

== Background ==
=== Positions up for election ===
Voters in the city elected the mayor of Porirua and 10 city councillors across 3 wards. They also elected several members of the Greater Wellington Regional Council.

=== Māori wards referendum ===
In May 2021, the Porirua City Council voted to establish a Māori ward, with the Parirua Māori ward first contested in the 2022 elections.

In July 2024, the National-led coalition government passed the Local Government (Electoral Legislation and Māori Wards and Māori Constituencies) Amendment Act 2024 which reinstated the requirement that councils must hold a referendum before establishing Māori wards or constituencies. In August 2024, the council voted unanimously to affirm their decision to establish the Māori constituency, thereby triggering a referendum on the constituency to be held alongside the 2025 local elections.

=== Amalgamation referendum ===
In May 2025, Porirua City Council voted to also hold an indicative referendum alongside the election regarding potential amalgamation of the council with Wellington City Council, Hutt City Council, Upper Hutt City Council and Greater Wellington Regional Council.

== List of candidates ==
=== Incumbents not seeking re-election ===
- Tracy Johnson, incumbent councillor for the Pāuatahanui general ward

=== Mayor ===
Candidate	Photo	Affiliation (Note: A candidate may leave their affiliation blank, run as an independent, or run with an affiliation to an organisation, local body ticket, political party, whānau, hapū, or iwi. Porirua City Council does not allow election slogans to be used for the affiliation.)	Notes
Anita Baker		Independent	Incumbent mayor since 2019
Kathleen Filo		Independent	Councillor for the Onepoto ward since 2022. Also ran for re-election as a councillor in the Onepoto general ward.
Ura Wilson-Pokoati		Independent	Also ran to be a councillor in the Onepoto general ward

=== Councillors ===
==== Parirua Māori ward ====
Parirua Māori ward returned one councillor to the city council.

Candidate	Affiliation	Notes
Raniera (Daniel) Albert	Independent	
Rawinia Te Rimene	Independent	
Jess Te Huia	Independent	Previously ran for the council in the Onepoto general ward in 2022
Kylie Wihapi	None	Incumbent councillor and deputy mayor

==== Onepoto General ward ====
The Onepoto General ward returned five councillors to the city council.

Candidate	Affiliation	Notes
Miriam Albert	Independent	
Angel Domingos	None	
Mike Duncan	None	Incumbent councillor
Chris Ellis	None	Community lawyer
Hemi Fermanis	Real Talk, Real Change	
Kathleen Filo	Independent	Incumbent councillor. Also ran for mayor.
Jaistone Finau	None	
Izzy Ford	None	Incumbent councillor
Moze Galo	None	Incumbent councillor
Geoff Hayward	Labour	Incumbent councillor
Sharon Hilling	None	
Zac Painting	Green	Policy analyst and teacher
Siobhan Samuel	None	
Ura Wilson-Pokoati	Independent	Also ran for mayor
Yan Zhang	Shared Kitchen and Sensory Hub Builder	

==== Pāuatahanui General ward ====
The Pāuatahanui General ward returned four councillors to the city council.

Candidate	Affiliation	Notes
Brent Ching	None	Previously ran for council in 2022
Phill Houlihan	ACT Local	Barber and law student
Moira Lawler	None	Community advocate
Ross Leggett	Independent	Incumbent councillor
Paul Nation	None	
Aditi Tiwari	Green	Student at Victoria University of Wellington
Josh Trlin	Labour	Incumbent councillor
Nathan Waddle	Independent	Incumbent councillor

== Results ==
Overall turnout was 40.7%, with 17,623 voting papers returned.

With final results, the following candidates were declared elected:

=== Summary ===
Ward	Previous	Elected
Mayor	Anita Baker	Anita Baker
Onepoto	Kathleen Filo	Kathleen Filo
Onepoto	Geoff Hayward	Geoff Hayward
Onepoto	Mike Duncan	Mike Duncan
Onepoto	Izzy Ford	Izzy Ford
Onepoto	Moze Galo	Hemi Fermanis
Pāuatahanui	Josh Trlin	Josh Trlin
Pāuatahanui	Nathan Waddle	Nathan Waddle
Pāuatahanui	Ross Leggett	Ross Leggett
Pāuatahanui	Tracy Johnson^{R}	Moira Lawler
Parirua Māori	Kylie Wihapi	Kylie Wihapi
^{R} – an incumbent that did not run for re-election

=== Mayor ===
Incumbent mayor Anita Baker won re-election to a third term.

2025 Porirua mayoral election
Party	Candidate	Primary votes	%	±%	Iteration	
Party	Candidate	Primary votes	%	±%	#	Votes
Independent	Anita Baker^{†}	8,517	48.33	−20.55	2nd	8,935
Independent	Kathleen Filo	7,225	41.00	(new)	2nd	8,033
Independent	Ura Wilson-Pokoati	1,565	8.88	+1.55	1st	1,565
Quota		8,654	49.11	+0.59		
Informal votes		39	0.22	−0.19		
Blank votes		277	1.57	−1.05		
Turnout		17,623	40.95	+3.61		
Registered electors		43,032				
Independent hold on 2nd iteration						
^{†} incumbent

=== Onepoto general ward ===
2025 Onepoto general ward election
Party	Candidate	Primary votes	%	±%	Iteration	
Party	Candidate	Primary votes	%	±%	#	Votes
Independent	Kathleen Filo^{†}	1,684	21.90	+16.16	1st	1,684
Labour	Geoff Hayward^{†}	1,337	17.39	+6.42	1st	1,337
Independent	Mike Duncan^{†}	903	11.74	−5.75	13th	1,221
Independent	Izzy Ford^{†}	863	11.22	−4.91	17th	1,282
Independent	Hemi Fermanis	515	6.70	(new)	22nd	1,146
Independent	Moze Galo^{†}	345	4.49	+0.64	22nd	981
Green	Zac Painting	336	4.37	(new)	19th	589
Independent	Ura Wilson-Pokoati	267	3.47	+1.25	16th	479
Independent	Jaistone Finau	324	4.21	(new)	13th	421
Independent	Chris Ellis	291	3.78	(new)	11th	393
Independent	Yan Zhang	280	3.64	(new)	8th	341
Independent	Siobhan Samuel	179	2.33	(new)	6th	219
Independent	Miriam Albert	85	1.11	(new)	5th	109
Independent	Angel Domingos	56	0.73	(new)	4th	70
Independent	Sharon Hilling	43	0.56	(new)	3rd	54
Quota		1,251	16.27	+0.02		
Informal votes		72	0.94	−1.47		
Blank votes		109	1.42	+0.07		
Turnout		7,690	36.60	+3.61		
Registered electors		21,009				
Independent hold on 1st iteration						
Labour hold on 1st iteration						
Independent hold on 13th iteration						
Independent hold on 17th iteration						
Independent gain from Independent on 22nd iteration						
^{†} incumbent

=== Pāuatahanui general ward ===
2025 Pāuatahanui general ward election
Party	Candidate	Primary votes	%	±%	Iteration	
Party	Candidate	Primary votes	%	±%	#	Votes
Labour	Josh Trlin^{†}	1,455	18.30	−7.81	3rd	1,774
Independent	Nathan Waddle^{†}	1,283	16.13	−0.70	5th	1,668
Independent	Moira Lawler	1,139	14.32	(new)	5th	1,576
Independent	Ross Leggett^{†}	1,244	15.64	−4.47	5th	1,576
ACT Local	Phill Houlihan	829	10.43	(new)	5th	1,170
Independent	Brent Ching	679	8.54	−1.54	4th	872
Green	Aditi Tiwari	614	7.72	(new)	2nd	639
Independent	Paul Nation	605	7.61	(new)	1st	605
Quota		1,570	19.74	+0.01		
Informal votes		18	0.23	−0.38		
Blank votes		86	1.08	−0.01		
Turnout		7,952	46.82	+1.01		
Registered electors		16,986				
Labour hold on 3rd iteration						
Independent hold on 5th iteration						
Independent gain from Independent on 5th iteration						
Independent hold on 5th iteration						
^{†} incumbent

=== Parirua Māori ward ===
Incumbent deputy mayor Kylie Wihapi won re-election to the council by only 11 votes over second-place candidate Jess Te Huia. Te Huia filed for a recount. The Porirua District Court conducted the recount and subsequently disallowed two special votes from Wihapi. However, this still resulted in Wihapi winning re-election.

2025 Parirua Māori ward election>ref name="stats 2025"/>
Party	Candidate	Primary votes	%	±%	Iteration	
Party	Candidate	Primary votes	%	±%	#	Votes
Independent	Kylie Wihapi^{†}	746	37.66	−12.68	3rd	936
Independent	Jess Te Huia	710	35.84	(new)	3rd	925
Independent	Raniera (Daniel) Albert	276	13.93	(new)	2nd	319
Independent	Rawinia Rimene	208	10.50	(new)	1st	208
Quota		970	48.97	−0.09		
Informal votes		12	0.61	+0.44		
Blank votes		28	1.41	−0.38		
Turnout		1,981	39.33	+13.69		
Registered electors		5,037				
Independent hold on 3rd iteration						
^{†} incumbent

=== Māori ward referendum ===
Choice	Votes	%
I vote to keep the Māori ward	11,775	69.20
I vote to remove the Māori ward	5,240	30.80
Total	17,015	100.00
Valid votes	17,015	96.55
Invalid/blank votes	608	3.45
Total votes	17,623	100.00

Māori ward referendum results (excluding invalid votes)
Keep; 11,775 (69.2%)	Remove; 5,240 (30.8%)
▲50%

=== Amalgamation referendum ===
A majority of Porirua voters voted in favour of exploring amalgamation with the Wellington, Lower Hutt and Upper Hutt councils.

Choice	Votes	%
Yes	9,581	56.43
No	7,399	43.57
Total	16,980	100.00
Valid votes	16,980	96.35
Invalid/blank votes	643	3.65
Total votes	17,623	100.00

Amalgamation referendum results (excluding invalid votes)
Yes; 9,581 (56.4%)	No; 7,399 (43.6%)
▲50%

== See also ==
- 2025 Greater Wellington Regional Council election
- 2025 Wellington City Council election
- 2025 Kāpiti Coast District Council election
- 2025 Hutt City Council election
- 2025 Upper Hutt City Council election
