= 1992 Porirua mayoral election =

- 10 October 1992
- Turnout: 14,506
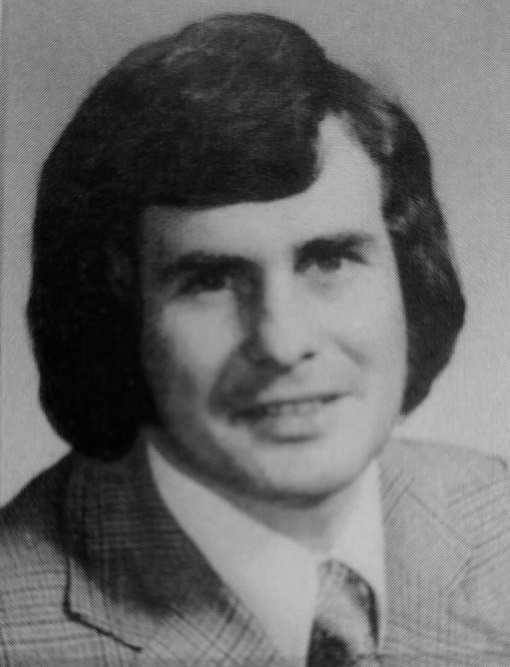

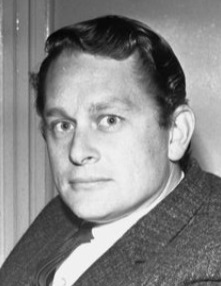
Candidate	John Burke	Don Borrie
Party	Labour	Independent
Popular vote	8,606	5,377
Percentage	59.32	37.06
Mayor before election
John Burke
Elected mayor
John Burke

The 1992 Porirua mayoral election was part of the New Zealand local elections held that same year. The elections were held for the role of Mayor of Porirua plus other local government positions including thirteen city councillors, also elected triennially. The polling was conducted using the standard first-past-the-post electoral method.

== Background ==
The incumbent Mayor, John Burke, stood for a fourth term and was successful. He was opposed by former member of the Wellington Harbour Board and Wellington Hospital Board Reverend Don Borrie. Labour maintained a majority on the council, while Borrie was elected to the council as well as five other independents.

== Mayoral results ==
The following table gives the election results:

1992 Porirua mayoral election
Party	Candidate	Votes	%	±%
Labour	John Burke	8,606	59.32	−5.26
Independent	Don Borrie	5,377	37.06	
Informal votes		523	3.60	−2.13
Majority		3,229	22.25	−12.66
Turnout		14,506		

== Ward results ==
Candidates were also elected from wards to the Porirua City Council.

Party/ticket	Councillors
Labour	7
Independent	6
