= Ken Mair =

New Zealand politician

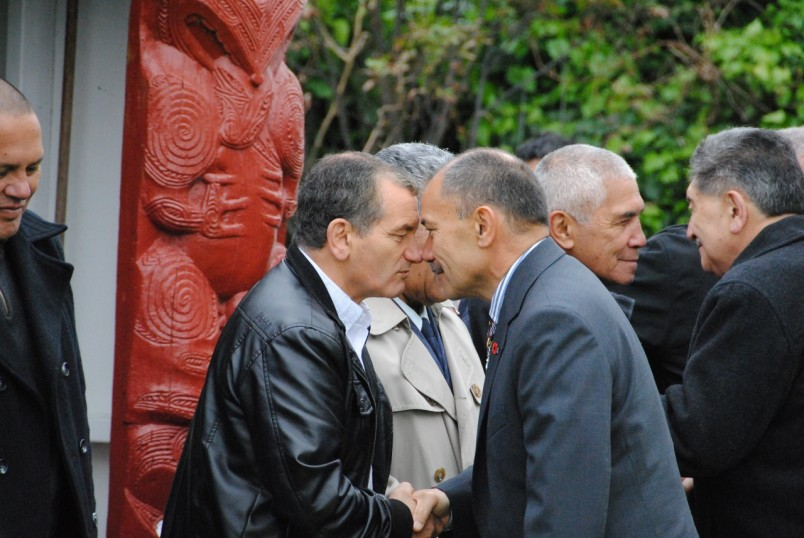
Mair (left) greeting Sir Jerry Mateparae with a hongi

Ken Mair is a New Zealand Māori rights activist and politician.

At the 1989 local-body elections he stood for Mayor of Porirua, but was defeated by incumbent John Burke by over 4,000 votes. Mair said he was surprised by how many votes he received and he was "only testing the water" in standing.

He has unsuccessfully contested several general elections for Mana Māori. He was ranked eighth on their party list in 1996, seventh in 1999, and second in 2002.

Mair has acted as a spokesperson for Māori iwi in the area around the Whanganui River, and was one of the organisers of the 1995 occupation of Moutoa Gardens in Whanganui, in protest at grievances under the Treaty of Waitangi.
