= 2022 Porirua City Council election =

Local election in New Zealand

- 8 October 2022
- Turnout: 15,640 (37.34%)
- Mayoral election
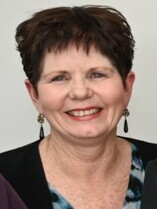

Candidate	Anita Baker	Tapu Elia
Party	Independent	Independent
Popular vote	10,773	1,875
Percentage	70.98%	12.35%
Mayor before election
Anita Baker
Independent
Elected mayor
Anita Baker
Independent
- Council election
- 10 seats on the Porirua City Council; 6 seats needed for a majority
Party	Seats	+/–
Independents	8	+1
Labour	2	0
Housing Action Porirua	2	0
This lists parties that won seats. See the complete results below.

The 2022 Porirua City Council election was a local election held from 16 September until 8 October in Porirua, New Zealand as part of that year's nation-wide local elections. Voters elected the mayor of Porirua and 10 city councillors for the 2022–2025 term of the Porirua City Council. Postal voting and the single transferable vote system were used.

== Background ==
=== Electoral system ===
The election was held using the single transferable vote system. Ten councillors were elected across three wards (two general and one Māori ward). This was the first election to feature a Māori ward in Poriura.

=== Fluoridation Failiure ===
In March 2022 Wellington Water announced that their entire water supply had no Fluoridation for a month and certain plants have not had Fluoridation in up to 10 months.The water supply had fluoride again by September.

== Campaign ==
Incumbent Mayor Anita Baker ran for reelection. She was opposed by three candidates; beauty salon owner Tapu Elia, school teacher Ura Wilson-Pokoati and systems-analyst Nicole Foss.

Mayoral candidate Nicole Foss ran on reducing council debt and spending, and against water fluoridization. Foss received support from anti-vaccination group Voices for Freedom. Although Foss claimed no affiliation with the group earlier in that year, the VFF had sent its members an email urging them to run for local council, but to run as independents. Foss had also appeared on five videos published on VFF's website.

=== Debates ===
Date	Organiser(s)	Moderator	Location	Participants			
Date	Organiser(s)	Moderator	Location	Baker	Elia	Foss	Wilson-Pokoati
15 September	Porirua Chamber of Commerce	Hamish Mexted	Whitirea	Present	Invited	Present	Present

== Results ==
=== Mayor ===
2022 Porirua City mayoral election
Party	Candidate	FPv%	Count
Party	Candidate	FPv%	1
Independent	Anita Baker	70.98%	10,773
Independent	Tapu Elia	12.35%	1,875
Independent	Nicole Foss	9.11%	1,383
Independent	Ura Wilson-Pokoati	7.56%	1,147
Valid: 15,178 Spoilt: 462 Quota: 7,589

=== Council ===
==== Onepoto general ward ====
The Onepoto general ward returned five councillors to the Porirua City Council.

2022 Onepoto General Ward Election
Party	Candidate	FPv%	Count																									
Party	Candidate	FPv%	1	2	3	4	5	6	7	8	9	10	11	12	13	14	15	16	17	18	19	20	21	22	23	24	25	26
Independent	Mike Duncan	17.94%	1182	1097.83	1098.14	1096.99	1107.22	1097.00	1110.85	1111.66	1107.02	1093.54	1101.32	1085.60	1117.30	1081.13	1071.41	1101.53	1070.98	1061.72	1097.46	1058.18	1087.24	1057.85	1023.62	1012.44	1008.55	1006.46
Independent	Izzy Ford	16.55%	1090	1104.24	1097.16	1097.16	1112.00	1096.39	1113.58	1120.64	1138.25	1088.64	1119.45	1082.80	1134.57	1078.48	1071.78	1124.68	1067.84	1062.16	1134.77	1052.77	1167.31	1045.64	1024.18	1012.04	1009.08	1006.63
Labour	Geoff Hayward	11.25%	741	752.18	753.46	753.65	760.96	765.67	774.83	790.56	821.71	834.51	855.73	866.43	900.66	920.37	923.80	951.57	970.57	973.73	1024.38	1052.26	1124.15	1059.67	1025.05	1013.01	1009.02	1006.72
Independent	Moze Galo	3.95%	260	262.14	262.74	262.78	273.82	275.60	280.05	297.36	341.45	348.30	422.77	428.83	480.61	491.49	493.15	650.50	662.02	663.64	782.03	800.78	939.68	988.78	1006.71	1014.03	1008.84	1006.74
Independent	Kathleen Filo	5.89%	388	395.05	395.72	395.83	406.01	408.60	431.78	472.75	499.93	507.23	530.79	537.22	615.08	627.80	630.02	671.50	684.00	686.09	770.42	789.90	916.83	969.74	990.87	999.26	1004.40	1007.25
Independent	David Turner	8.26%	544	570.35	571.04	571.42	581.27	586.56	625.33	648.03	662.84	674.84	687.14	698.13	721.43	742.58	747.04	763.97	783.47	787.65	818.90	846.81	890.56	946.87	975.09	985.61	990.40	993.11
Independent	Murray Faivalu	6.30%	415	417.07	417.32	417.35	419.50	420.41	426.73	435.21	454.60	457.79	476.30	479.05	515.96	521.14	522.02	565.68	571.08	571.95	648.44	658.49						
Independent	Siania Findlay	5.25%	346	347.92	348.48	348.53	354.80	356.53	359.05	368.05	395.28	401.15	444.91	450.14	478.33	487.38	478.33	545.01	554.62	556.01								
Independent	Zechariah Fred Reuelu	5.65%	372	373.57	373.76	373.79	393.88	394.60	401.07	408.37	418.80	421.32	444.51	446.65	467.04	470.88	471.52											
Independent	Tapu Elia	4.37%	288	290.42	290.73	290.77	322.88	324.03	327.25	324.14	358.42	361.99	394.08	397.27														
Independent	Dennis Makalio Jr	4.13%	272	273.64	273.99	274.02	279.03	280.10	285.39	301.16	313.20	316.82																
Independent	Faafoi Seiuli	3.37%	222	224.07	224.70	224.75	226.84	228.67	232.12	241.62																		
Independent	Jessica Te Huia	2.55%	168	170.35	170.75	170.79	173.83	175.18	183.29																			
Independent	Branden Potgieter	2.26%	149	151.92	152.19	152.23	153.39	154.46																				
Independent	Ura Wilson-Pokoati	2.28%	150	151.42	151.59	151.62																						
Valid: 6,587 Spoilt: 254 Quota: first iteration: 1097.83, last iteration: 1004.49

==== Pāuatahanui general ward ====
The Pāuatahanui general ward returned four councillors to the Porirua City Council.

2022 Pāuatahanui General Ward Election
Party	Candidate	FPv%	Count							
Party	Candidate	FPv%	1	2	3	4	5	6	7	8
Labour	Josh Trlin	26.47%	2,013	1,525.37	1,529.77	1,526.02	1,515.79	1,568.97	1.539.83	1,517.79
Independent	Ross Leggett	20.39%	1,551	1,561.94	1,515.58	1,561.94	1,512.60	1,578.24	1,624.21	1,517.87
Independent	Nathan Waddle	17.07%	1,298	1,418.21	1,450.76	1,471.40	1,488.38	1,549.57	1,587.83	1,530.77
Independent	Tracy Johnson	13.16%	1,001	1,087.98	1,126.30	1,169.59	1,188.04	1,291.79	1,426.87	1,511.31
Independent	Brent Ching	10.22%	777	846.09	865.66	937.46	948.07	1,053.77	1,225.55	1,286.15
Independent	Nicole Foss	5.42%	412	419.90	424.22	451.32	453.59	475.23		
Independent	Andrea Nicol Coulston	4.21%	320	382.88	391.48	426.84	432.50			
Independent	David Christensen	3.06%	233	244.17	249.90					
Valid: 7,605 Spoilt: 106 Quota: first iteration: 1,521, last iteration: 1472.78

==== Parirua Māori ward ====
The Parirua Māori ward returned one councillor to the Porirua City Council.

2022 Parirua Māori War Election
Party	Candidate	FPv%	Count
Party	Candidate	FPv%	1
Independent	Kylie Wihapi	51.35%	590
Independent	Caleb Te Taku Ware	48.65%	559
Valid: 1,149 Spoilt: 23 Quota: 575

== See also ==
- 2022 Greater Wellington Regional Council election
- 2022 Hutt City Council election
- 2022 Upper Hutt City Council election
- 2022 Kāpiti Coast District Council election
