= Nick Leggett =

New Zealand politician (born 1979)

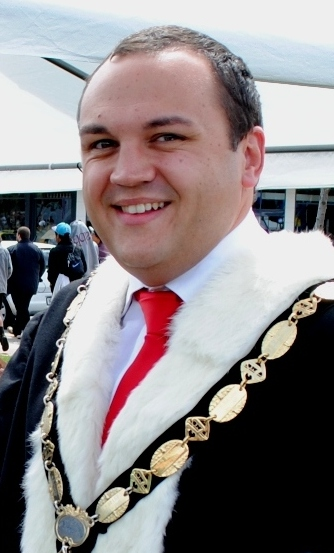
- Leggett in 2012

4th Mayor of Porirua
- In office 2010–2016
- Preceded by: Jenny Brash
- Succeeded by: Mike Tana

Personal details
- Born: Nicholas Oliver Leggett; 1979 (age 46–47) Porirua, New Zealand
- Party: National (2016–present); Independent (2016); Labour (1994–2016)
- Spouse: Emily Pita (m. 2014)

Nicholas Oliver Leggett (born 1979) is a former New Zealand politician and, as of 2016, a member of the New Zealand National Party. He was Mayor of Porirua from 2010 until 2016, and at the time of his election in October 2010, he was the youngest mayor in New Zealand.

== Early life ==
Leggett was born in Porirua City in 1979 and grew up in Whitby, Plimmerton, Papakowhai, and Paremata. He was educated at Paremata School and Tawa College, and then studied at Victoria University of Wellington, graduating with a BA in political science.

== Local-body politics ==
Leggett was first elected to Porirua City Council as a councillor in 1998, when he was 19. He wanted to achieve better representation of younger people on council, as 75 per cent of the population were under 45 but nobody on council was. He was re-elected in 2001, but did not stand for election in 2004. In 2007, he was elected in the Porirua Northern Ward, coming second.

At the local-body elections in October 2010, Leggett contested the Porirua mayoralty as one of nine candidates. He was then working as a real estate agent, specialising in commercial and industrial sales.

Leggett was endorsed by the outgoing mayor of 12 years, Jenny Brash, as well as former mayor, John Burke. Leggett was successful with 5930 votes, his closest rival, incumbent deputy mayor Litea Ah Hoi, receiving 2973 votes. When he was elected, he became the youngest mayor in New Zealand at the time (although there have been younger mayors, including Norman Kirk, who was 30 when elected mayor of Kaiapoi in 1953). Leggett was re-elected Porirua mayor in 2013 with 9252 votes (76%).

Leggett served on the Porirua Community Trust from 2004 to 2007 and 2010 to 2013. In 2013, he was elected a member of the Capital and Coast District Health Board. Leggett enjoyed high approval ratings during his two terms as Porirua Mayor.

Although a member of the New Zealand Labour Party throughout his career in local body politics, Leggett stood as an independent candidate.

=== Campaign to be Mayor of Wellington ===
In April 2016, he resigned from the Labour Party to run for Mayor of Wellington as an independent; Justin Lester had already been selected as the official Labour candidate and it is against party rules for members to compete against officially endorsed candidates. Central to his launch campaign speech was a desire to put an end to the "bickering" and "palace politics" holding the Wellington City Council back and to facilitate a new Sports Museum and Virtual Reality Centre for Wellington. In August 2016, Labour Leader Andrew Little accused Leggett of being a "right-winger", alleging that his campaign manager for the Wellington Mayoral election was a well-known ACT Party figure. Leggett came second in the mayoral race, finishing about 6,000 votes behind Lester. Leggett then changed allegiance to the National Party later that year citing ideological differences with Labour's leadership and announced he intended to seek the National candidacy for the Mana electorate in 2017. Leggett later abandoned his plans to run for Parliament but stated he would still campaign for the National Party in the area.

When he contested the Wellington mayoralty in 2016, Leggett moved to Johnsonville.

== Professional career after politics ==
In 2017 the Leggetts moved back to Porirua; buying a house in Papakowhai. Leggett was then a business consultant.

In 2018 Leggett was the executive director of the New Zealand Alcohol Beverages Council.

In October 2018 Leggett was appointed the CEO of Transporting New Zealand, a lobby group which promotes the interests of the trucking road freight industry. In 2023, Leggett left Transporting New Zealand to become CEO of Infrastructure New Zealand, and was appointed Chair of Wellington Water the same year. He resigned as Chair of Wellington Water in February 2026 after a failure at the wastewater treatment plant at Moa Point, which was operated by the French multinational firm Veolia, a member of Infrastructure New Zealand.

== Personal life ==
Nick Leggett married Emily Pita in 2014; they have a son. In early 2011, Leggett underwent a lap band operation to combat issues surrounding obesity, and he subsequently reduced his weight from 110 kg to 79 kg.

Political offices
Preceded by Jenny Brash	Mayor of Porirua; 2010–2016	Succeeded by Mike Tana
