= Anita Baker (New Zealand politician) =

New Zealand politician

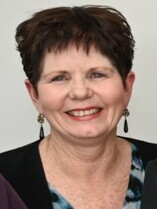

6th Mayor of Porirua
- Incumbent
- Assumed office 19 October 2019
- Deputy: Izzy Ford (2019–2022); Kylie Wihapi (2022–2026)
- Preceded by: Mike Tana

Personal details
- Born: Porirua
- Spouse: Phil Rhodes

Anita Baker is a New Zealand local-body politician. She was first elected to the Porirua City Council in 2010, and was elected to Mayor of Porirua in 2019. She was re-elected as mayor in 2022 and 2025.

Baker's husband, Phil Rhodes, won election to the Greater Wellington Regional Council as a councillor for the Porirua-Tawa constituency in the 2025 local elections.

Political offices
Preceded by Mike Tana	Mayor of Porirua since 2019
