= Porirua City Council =

Territorial authority of New Zealand

Porirua City Council Te Kaunihera o Porirua
- Coat of arms

- Brand logo

Type
- Type: Territorial authority of Porirua
- Term limits: None

History
- Established: 1 November 1989: 37 years ago
- Preceded by: Porirua City Council
- New session started: 18 October 2025

Leadership
- Mayor: Anita Baker, Ind. since October 2019
- Deputy: Geoff Hayward, Labour since November 2026
- CEO: Wendy Walker since October 2015

Structure
- Seats: 11 (including mayor)
- Political groups: Labour (2); Independent (8); vacant (1)
- Length of term: 3 years

Elections
- Voting system: Single transferable vote
- First election: 14 October 1989
- Last election: 11 October 2025
- Next election: 14 October 2028

Meeting place
- 16 Cobham Court

Website
- poriruacity.govt.nz

Porirua City Council (abbr. PCC; Māori: Te Kaunihera o Porirua) is the territorial authority for the city of Porirua, New Zealand. It serves as the city's local government alongside the Greater Wellington Regional Council as the regional council.

A borough council for the area was initially formed in 1962. In 1965, the borough was granted city status. Following the 1989 reforms to local government, that city council was dissolved and the current authority was established under the same name.

The governing body of council has 11 councillors and is chaired by the mayor of Porirua (currently Anita Baker since October 2019).

== History ==
=== Predecessors ===
Local government in the Porirua basin began on 1 June 1854 with the Porirua Road Board being declared in the Wellington Provincial Council Gazette. Road boards were set up by the provincial governments to develop and maintain local and district roads.

The first election for the Porirua Road District, held under the District Highways Act 1856, took place on 20 September 1856. On 7 November 1864, the Takapu Road District was declared and wardens for the district were elected annually. The Wellington Highway District Board (Hutt County) was given control of the district in 1872.

In 1876, Makara and Porirua ridings were made part of the Karori-Makara Highway Board and elections were conducted. Later that year, Porirua was established as one of six ridings making up Hutt County, which in turn was established by the Counties Act 1876 as one of 12 counties which would replace the Wellington Province. It elected 2 councillors to the Hutt County Council.

In 1908, Makara County, an amalgamation of the Porirua riding with the Makara riding and Tawa, was separated from Hutt County. The first elections for Makara County were held on 28 January 1908.

Following the construction of a new business district on the site of the village of Porirua beginning in the 1950s, the autonomous Borough of Porirua was established on 1 September 1962, the day after Makara County was abolished. The rest of what had been the Makara County was re-incorporated into Hutt County as the Makara Riding. Tawa had already separated from the county to form its own Town Board in 1951.

Porirua was declared to be a city on 2 October 1965 by Governor-general Sir Bernard Fergusson, after reaching the population threshold of 20,000.

On 1 April 1973, the city of Porirua was expanded to include large areas to the north-east and some to the south, transferred from Hutt County, along with Mana Island. In 1988, it was further expanded to include the Horokiri riding, which contained most of Whitby and large rural areas, before Hutt County was abolished in the 1989 local government reforms, which transferred to Wellington City most of the southern fringe areas that had been added in 1973 – notably the Takapu Valley and Arohata.

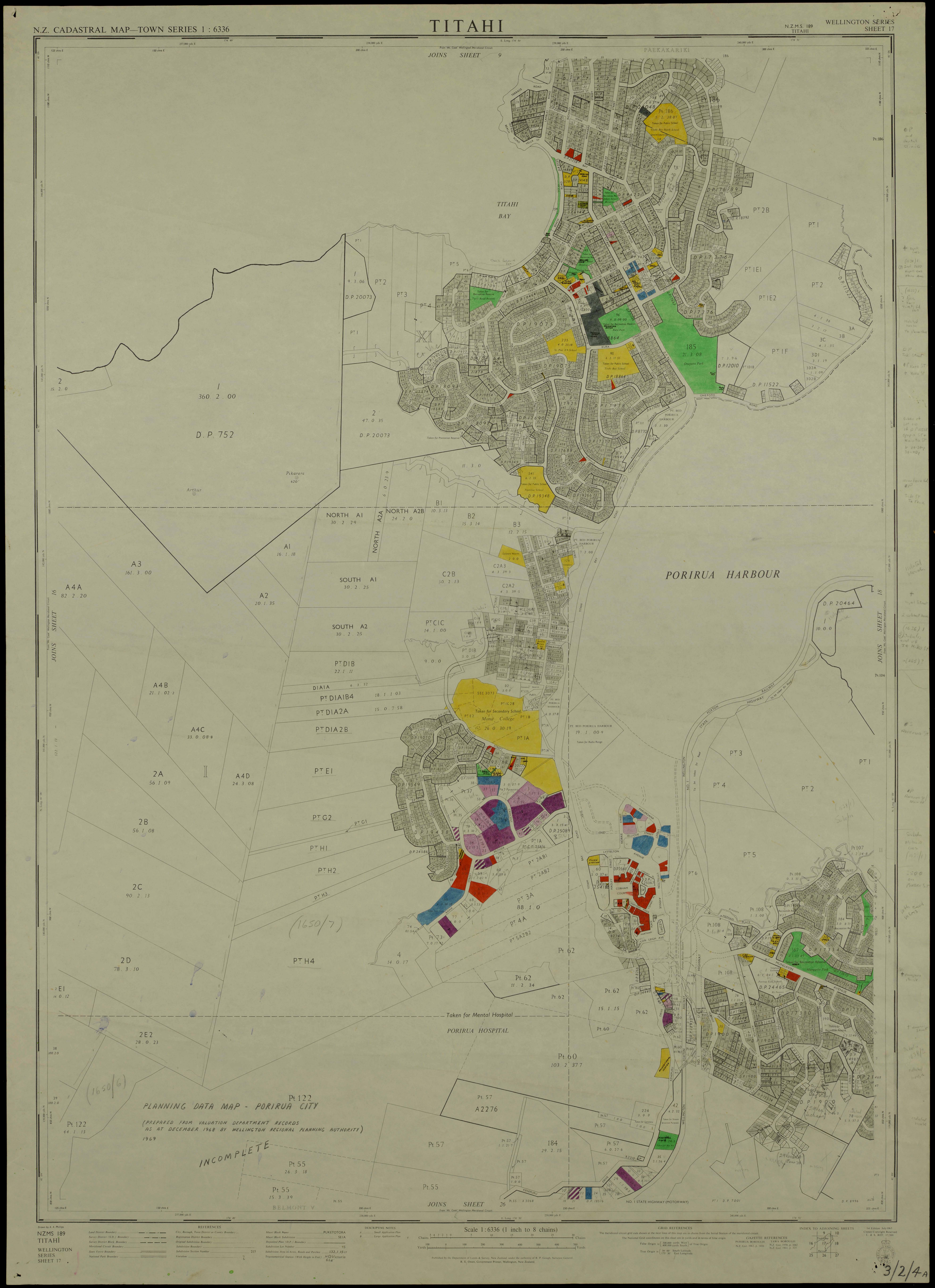
A cadastral map showing the boundaries of Porirua city in 1969

== Governing body ==
The elected mayor and councillors provide governance for the city by setting the policy direction of the council, monitoring its performance, representing the city's interests, and employing the Chief Executive.

=== Mayor ===
One mayor is elected at-large; they chair meetings of the governing body and act as the head of local government in the city.

=== Current composition ===
As of November 2026, the members of the governing body of council are:

Role	Portrait	Name	Affiliation	Ward
Mayor		Anita Baker	Independent	Elected at-large
Deputy mayor		Geoff Hayward (Note: Councillor Hayward was appointed as deputy mayor on 5 November 2026 following the death of former deputy mayor Kylie Wihapi on 31 October 2026.)	Labour	Onepoto general
Councillor		Hemi Fermanis	Independent	Onepoto general
Councillor		Kathleen Filo	Independent	Onepoto general
Councillor		Izzy Ford	Independent	Onepoto general
Councillor		Jo Dow (Note: Sworn in on 29 October 2026, having been elected in a by-election following the death of councillor Mike Duncan in June 2026.)	Independent	Onepoto general
Councillor		Josh Trlin	Labour	Pāuatahanui general
Councillor		Ross Leggett	Independent	Pāuatahanui general
Councillor		Nathan Waddle	Independent	Pāuatahanui general
Councillor		Moira Lawler	Independent	Pāuatahanui general
Councillor		vacant (Note: Vacancy caused by the death of deputy mayor Kylie Wihapi in October 2026.)		Parirua Māori

== Committees ==
As of November 2026, the committees of the Porirua City Council are:

Committees of the Porirua City Council
Committee	Chairperson	Deputy Chairperson	Members
Council; Te Kaunihera o Porirua	Mayor Baker	Dpty Hayward	All councillors; Te Taku Parai, Council Kaumātua (Te Runanga o Toa Rangatira) (Note: Non-voting member)
Te Puna Kōrero	Cr Trlin & Cr Waddle		Mayor Baker; All Councillors; Te Taku Parai
Audit and Risk Committee; Komiti Tātari me te Mōrea	Warren Allen (Note: External member)	Cr Waddle	Mayor Baker; Cr Lawler; Cr Leggett; Cr Trlin; Felicity Caird
Chief Executive Employment Committee; Komiti Whai Mahi a te Tumuaki	Cr Leggett	Mayor Baker	Cr Ford; Cr Trlin; Cr Lawler; Cr Waddle; Dpty Hayward; Te Taku Parai
Dog Control Hearings Subcommittee; Komiti Iti mō Ngā Whakawātanga Whakahaere Kurī	Mayor Baker		Dpty Hayward; Cr Waddle
Porirua District Licensing Committee; Te Rōpū Tuku Raihana Waipiro o Porirua	Dpty Hayward	Cr Leggett	Saar Conen Rohen; Nicole Maloney; Kevin Watson; David Ritchie; Jessica Schreiber; Premduth Singh; Vivienne Holm

== Chief executive ==
The Chief Executive is in charge of the administration of the council and employs all other council staff to achieve its strategic priorities. The Chief Executive is currently Wendy Walker.

== Elections ==
=== By-elections ===
In June 2026, Onepoto councillor Mike Duncan died after having served on the council since 2016. His death will trigger a by-election, which will be held on 16 October 2026.

=== List ===
==== Council ====
- 1989
- 1992
- 1995
- 1998
- 2001
- 2004
- 2007
- 2010
- 2013
- 2016
- 2019
- 2022
- 2025
- (2026)

==== Mayoral ====
- 1989
- 1992
- 1995
- 1998
- 2001
- 2004
- 2007
- 2010
- 2013
- 2016
- 2019
- 2022
- 2025

== Wards ==
The 10 councillors are elected from three wards: Onepoto General Ward, Pāuatahanui General Ward, and Parirua Māori Ward.

Candidates standing in the general wards are elected by voters registered on the general electoral roll, while those standing in the Māori ward are elected by voters registered on the Māori electoral roll.

=== Parirua Māori Ward ===
The Parirua Māori Ward elects 1 councillor and covers the whole city of Porirua.

The Parirua Māori Ward was established following a council vote in May 2021, a representation review and an appeal to the Local Government Commission which upheld its establishment. The Parirua Māori ward was first contested in the 2022 elections.

In July 2024, the National-led coalition government passed the Local Government (Electoral Legislation and Māori Wards and Māori Constituencies) Amendment Act 2024 which reinstated the requirement that councils must hold a referendum before establishing Māori wards or constituencies. In August 2024, the council voted unanimously to affirm their decision to establish the Māori constituency, thereby triggering a referendum on the constituency to be held alongside the 2025 local elections. Porirua voters elected to retain the Māori ward.

=== Onepoto General Ward ===
The Onepoto General Ward elects 5 councillors and covers:

- Rangituhi / Colonial Knob
- Elsdon
- Kenepuru
- Mana Island
- Onepoto
- Porirua Central
- Takapūwāhia
- Tītahi Bay
- Aotea
- Ascot Park
- Cannons Creek
- Rānui
- Waitangirua

=== Pāuatahanui General Ward ===
The Pāuatahanui General Ward elects 4 councillors and covers:

- Camborne
- Hongoeka
- Judgeford
- Karehana Bay
- Mana
- Paekākāriki Hill
- Papakōwhai
- Paremata
- Pāuatahanui
- Plimmerton
- Pukerua Bay
- Whitby

== Civic symbols ==
=== Coat of arms ===
Porirua City was granted a Coat of Arms by the Earl Marshal of England on 1 December 1965. The city officially adopted the coat of arms via a bylaw on 27 November 1969.

Coat of arms of Porirua
Crest On a Wreath of the Colours in front of a Lymphad proper Sail set Pennon flying Gules Flags flying Azure a Whale proper. Escutcheon Vert two Piles Barry wavy of ten Argent and Azure Supporters On the dexter side a Private Soldier of the 58th Regiment of Foot in the uniform of the early Nineteenth Century and on the sinister side a Māori Warrior both proper. Motto Mo Te Katoa Nga Mahi (All That is Done is For the Benefit of All) Symbolism The green of the shield represents the rural countryside when Porirua was first settled. The blue and white triangles (Piles) symbolise the two arms of Porirua Harbour. The whale and "lymphad" (sailing ship) represent whaling, which was an important early industry in the area, and the many ships that visited the harbour. The 58th Regiment of Foot spent time in the Porirua area in the nineteenth century, and the Māori warrior represents the long settlement of Māori in the area.

=== Flag ===
Flag of Porirua

The city of Porirua first adopted a flag in 1978 following a competition for designs among local schools, with the winning design being submitted by John Mansfield of Papakowhai School. This flag consisted of a yellow cross on a green background with the coat of arms superimposed over it. After the 1989 local government reforms, the new Porirua City Council did not seek to continue use of this flag.

The present flag of Porirua was adopted on 30 September 1998. It has several blue stripes, and a green shape to symbolise the city's harbour and land. The canton optionally features the coat of arms.

== Notable council members ==
- Whitford Brown, the first Mayor of Porirua
- Ken Douglas, trade union leader
- Ken Gray, All Black
- Gary McCormick, poet, radio and television personality
- Helen Smith, first member of the Values Party to be elected to local government
- Rex Willing

== See also ==
- Territorial authorities bordering Porirua City Council:
  - Wellington City Council
  - Hutt City Council
  - Upper Hutt City Council
  - Kāpiti Coast District Council
- Greater Wellington Regional Council – the regional council covering Porirua
