= Izzy Ford =

New Zealand rugby union player and politician

Deputy mayor of Porirua
- In office 2016–2022
- Preceded by: 'Ana Coffey
- Succeeded by: Kylie Wihapi

Personal details
- Born: Izzy I. Gray; 19 January 1974 (age 52) Porirua, New Zealand
- Education: Bishop Viard College
- Height: 1.70 m (5 ft 7 in)
- Weight: 72 kg (159 lb)

Rugby union career
Provincial / State sides
Years	Team	Apps	(Points)
	Wellington	heaps	(351)
International career
Years	Team	Apps	(Points)
1999–2005	New Zealand	5	(5)
Medal record
Representing New Zealand
Women's rugby union
Rugby World Cup
Gold medal – first place	2002 Spain	Team competition

Izzy I. Ford (née Gray; born 19 January 1974) is a New Zealand local-body politician and former rugby union player. She served as deputy mayor of Porirua from 2016 to 2022.

== Early life and family ==
Ford was born in Porirua on 19 January 1974, and was educated at Bishop Viard College. She is married to Glynn Ford, and they have three children, including Jayden Ford, who in July 2023 was the 166th-ranked amateur golfer in the world.

== Rugby union ==
Ford made her debut for the New Zealand women's national rugby team, the Black Ferns, against Canada at Palmerston North in 1999. She was named in the 2002 Women's Rugby World Cup squad for New Zealand.

In 2017, Ford became the first woman appointed to the Wellington Rugby Board for 20 years; Fran Wilde had served on the board in 1996.

== Local politics ==
Ford was first elected as a Porirua city councillor for the Eastern Ward in 2013. She was re-elected in 2016 and 2019, when she was the top-polling candidate in the Eastern Ward. Ford stood for the Porirua mayoralty at the 2019 local-body elections, and finished third out of six candidates. She served as the deputy mayor of Porirua from 2016 to 2022. Ford was re-elected to the council in the 2022 local elections for the Onepoto Ward.

Ford was re-elected as a councillor in the 2025 local elections.
