= Mayor of Porirua =

- Porirua coat of arms

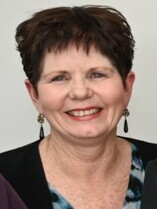
- Incumbent; Anita Baker since 2019
- Style: Her Worship
- Term length: Three years
- Inaugural holder: Whitford Brown
- Formation: 1962
- Deputy: Geoff Hayward
- Salary: $151,954
- Website: Official website

The mayor of Porirua is the head of the municipal government of Porirua, New Zealand, and presides over the Porirua City Council. The mayor is directly elected using the single transferable vote electoral system. There have been six mayors since the establishment of the borough council in 1962: the current mayor is Anita Baker, who was elected in October 2019.

== History ==
The locality was part the Makara County Council, abolished on 31 August 1962. The rural area became part of Hutt County, the urban area becoming Porirua Borough Council. Elections were held in October 1962, and Whitford Brown was elected the first mayor of Porirua. During Brown's term, Porirua achieved city status on 2 October 1965. At the time, this required having a population of at least 20,000. In the first triennium the mayor received honorarium for their duties of £750 per annum. At the first council meeting following the 1965 elections councillors voted to keep the honorarium at the same amount after the council was upgraded from a borough to a city.

Brown retired from the mayoralty in 1983. He was succeeded by John Burke, who had been Deputy Mayor since 1977. Burke remained mayor for 15 years (five terms) until 1998.

Jenny Brash was first elected mayor in 1998, succeeding Burke. She held the mayoralty for 12 years (four terms) until her retirement in October 2010. She was a Northern Ward councillor in 1983–89 and 1995–98.

Nick Leggett was elected mayor on 9 October 2010, defeating Deputy Mayor Litea Ah Hoi. He had been endorsed by his predecessor plus former mayor John Burke, and was first elected as a councillor in Porirua in 1998, when he was 19 years old. Aged 31 on his election to mayor, he was at the time the youngest mayor in New Zealand. In October 2016, Leggett was succeeded by Mike Tana.

== List of mayors of Porirua ==
Porirua has had six mayors:

Key

Independent Labour

#	Name	Portrait	Term	Elections
1	Whitford Brown		1962–1983	1962 • 1965 • 1968; 1971 • 1974 • 1977; 1980
2	John Burke		1983–1998	1983 • 1986 • 1989; 1992 • 1995
3	Jenny Brash		1998–2010	1998 • 2001; 2004 • 2007
4	Nick Leggett		2010–2016	2010 • 2013
5	Mike Tana		2016–2019	2016
6	Anita Baker		2019–present	2019 • 2022 • 2025

=== List of deputy mayors of Porirua ===
Name	Term of office		Mayor
Ernie Maxwell	1962	1968	Brown
Jill Nixon	1968	1971	Brown
Tutuira Wi Neera	1971	1972†	Brown
Hec Stuart	1972	1977	Brown
John Burke	1977	1983	Brown
Bill Herewini	1983	1985†	Burke
Hec Stuart	1985†		Burke
Ivan Hardgrave	1985	1989	Burke
Jasmine Underhill	1989	2001	Burke
Jasmine Underhill	1989	2001	Brash
Kevin Watson	2001	2004	Brash
Euon Murrell	2004	2007	Brash
Litea Ah Hoi	2007	2010	Brash
Liz Kelly	2010	2013	Leggett
'Ana Coffey	2013	2016	Leggett
Izzy Ford	2016	2022	Tana
Izzy Ford	2016	2022	Baker
Kylie Wihapi	2022	2026†	Baker
Geoff Hayward	2026	present	Baker
