= Ken Gray (rugby union) =

New Zealand international rugby union players

Ken Gray MBE
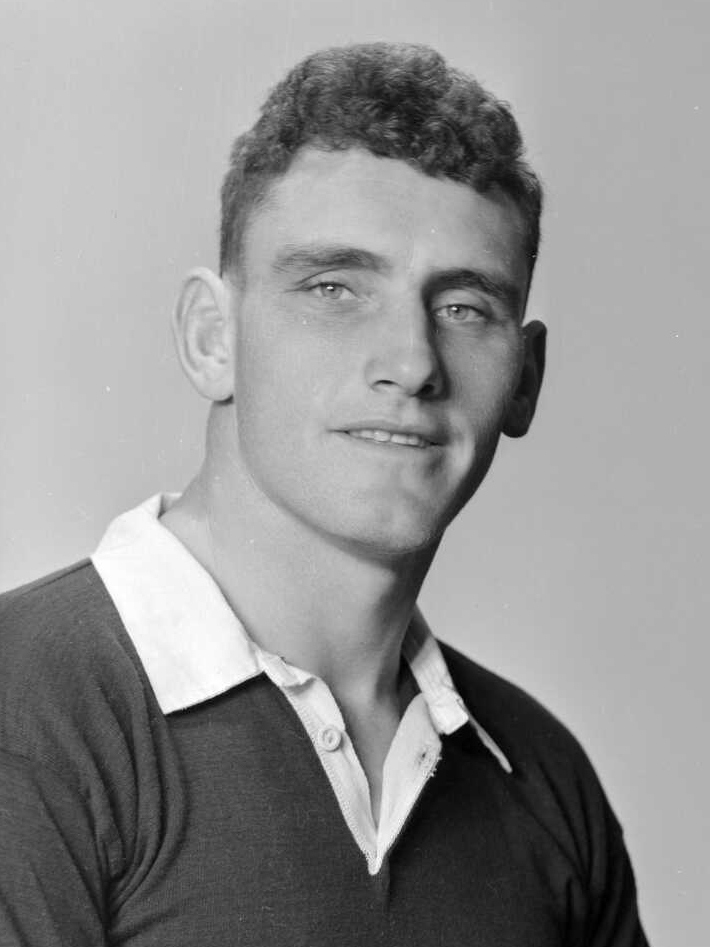
- Gray c. 1963

Deputy Chairman of the Wellington Regional Council
- In office 14 October 1989 – 18 November 1992
- Chairman: Stuart Macaskill
- Preceded by: Keith Spry
- Succeeded by: Alison Lawson

Member of the Wellington Regional Council for Porirua
- In office 11 October 1986 – 18 November 1992
- Preceded by: Whitford Brown
- Succeeded by: Barbara Donaldson

Personal details
- Born: Kenneth Francis Gray; 24 June 1938 Porirua, New Zealand
- Died: 18 November 1992 (aged 54) Pāuatahanui, New Zealand
- Party: Labour
- Spouse: Joy
- Children: 3
- Occupation: Farmer
- Height: 1.90 m (6 ft 3 in)
- Weight: 99 kg (218 lb)
- School: Wellington College

Rugby union career
- Position: Prop
International career
Years	Team	Apps	(Points)
1963–1969	New Zealand	24	(12)

Kenneth Francis Gray MBE (24 June 1938 – 18 November 1992) was an international rugby union player from New Zealand. He represented New Zealand in 24 international games, playing lock and later prop forward.

== Biography ==
=== Early life ===
He was born in 1938 in Porirua. He attended Plimmerton School and later Wellington College. As a child he was involved in many sports and showed a particular interest in rugby and showjumping.

He was a sheep farmer in Pāuatahanui, the location of his family's farm. He was married to Joy with whom he had three children.

=== Rugby career ===
Gray played rugby for the Petone Rugby Club and was picked to play provincial rugby for Wellington before the age of 20. In 1963 he was selected for the All Blacks. He played 50 matches for New Zealand, 24 of them test matches, between then and 1969.

Gray was regarded as an intelligent, vigorous and highly mobile forward who was especially noted a lineout jumper. He could play on either side of a scrum. He captained Petone to win the Jubilee Cup three years in a row in 1967, 1968 and 1969.

In 1970, he refused to tour South Africa in protest at its policy of apartheid and retired from the game. Initially he cited family and business reasons for his sudden withdrawal from the game before the real reason was revealed several months later. He stressed his decision was a personal one and did not think that the New Zealand Rugby Union should have cancelled the tour as it was the government's decision "if it had the gumption".

Trevor Richards, national chairperson of Halt All Racist Tours (HART) said Gray's decision was a generation ahead of its time:

Ken Gray announced he would not tour South Africa with the 1970 All Blacks. His decision was a carefully considered one, based on a fundamental and deeply held opposition to apartheid. In personal terms it proved visionary. It is a measure of the man that personal consideration never deflected him from standing up and calling a wrong by its name.

Gray was a prominent critic of 1981 Springbok tour of New Zealand and joined the public demonstrations and protests against on the tour.

=== Political career ===
He was elected a Hutt County Councillor in 1971 as the member for the Taupo riding. His father preceded him as a member of the Hutt County Council. In 1973 when the riding he represented was absorbed into the Porirua City Council he was elected as a Porirua City Councillor, serving until 1977. Later he was elected to the Hutt Valley Energy Board. He joined the Labour Party and became the vice-chairman of the Kapiti Labour Electorate Committee. Gray served as a board member for New Zealand Rail and chairman of the Government Health Sponsorship Council.

He publicly supported the legalisation of homosexuality in New Zealand, a stance for which he received much criticism from contemporaries. Fran Wilde, who introduced the bill to legalise, said Gray did much to dispel public ignorance on the issue.

In 1986 he was elected to the Wellington Regional Council in the Porirua ward on the Labour Party ticket where he continued to serve until his unexpected death in 1992. He was chair of the council's operations committee and between 1989 and 1992 he was the council's deputy chairman.

In the lead up to the 1987 election Gray put himself forward to replace the retiring Gerry Wall as Labour candidate for the Porirua electorate. He was regarded as the favourite in the lead up but in a shock upset he missed out on the nomination to trade unionist Graham Kelly. Three years later he stood for the Labour candidacy in the seat of Wanganui for the 1990 election, but missed out again.

In August 1992, Gray was selected as the Labour candidate for Western Hutt parliamentary electorate in the 1993 election, but he died before the election. This seat was held by National at the time. Historian Lindsay Knight said it was "a seat which he almost certainly would have won". Labour Party leader Mike Moore said "Ken was an outstanding citizen ... He was a man of firm principle. He would have made a marvellous Member of Parliament. Having given more than most people in two lifetimes, he still had so much more to give us."

=== Death ===
Gray died suddenly in his sleep of a heart attack on 18 November 1992, aged 54 at his home in Pāuatahanui. His funeral was at Old St Paul's, Wellington and he was buried at St Albans Churchyard, Pauatahanui.

== Honours ==
In the 1990 Queen's Birthday Honours, Gray was appointed a Member of the Order of the British Empire, for services to local-body affairs.

The Petone Rugby Club, where he played, commemorates him with the Ken Gray Academy. The Ken Gray Education Centre was established in a converted shearing shed on the Battle Hill Forest Farm, near the Gray family farm, Pauatahanui Inlet near Pāuatahanui, after his death.

Political offices
Preceded by Keith Spry	Deputy Chairman of the Wellington Regional Council; 1989–1992	Succeeded by Alison Lawson
