= Ken Douglas =

New Zealand trade unionist (1935–2022)

Ken Douglas ONZ
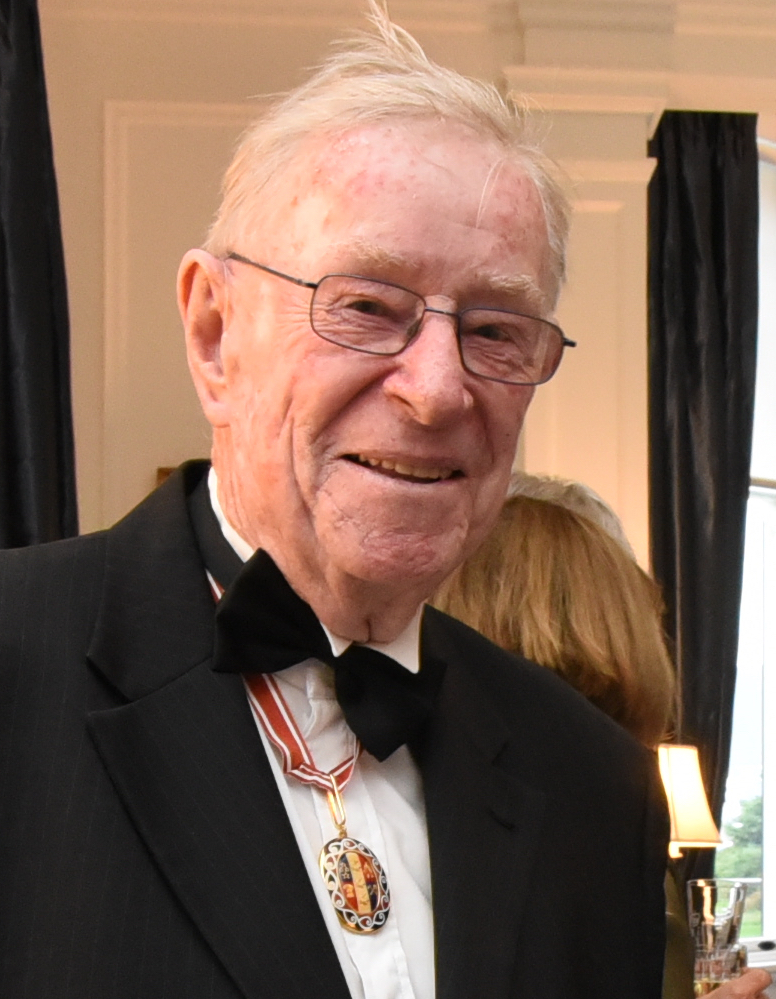
- Douglas in 2018

1st President of the New Zealand Council of Trade Unions
- In office 20 October 1987 – 1 November 1999
- Preceded by: Jim Knox (Note: As President of the Federation of Labour)
- Succeeded by: Ross Wilson

Secretary of the Federation of Labour
- In office 2 May 1979 – 20 October 1987
- Preceded by: Jim Knox
- Succeeded by: office abolished

Personal details
- Born: Kenneth George Douglas; 15 November 1935 Wellington, New Zealand
- Died: 14 September 2022 (aged 86) Wellington, New Zealand
- Party: Communist Party of New Zealand (1960-1963); Socialist Unity Party (1963-1990)
- Spouse: Lesley Winter (m. 1956; div. 1986)
- Children: 4

Kenneth George Douglas ONZ (15 November 1935 – 14 September 2022) was a New Zealand trade union leader.

== Early life ==
Douglas was born in Wellington in 1935. His parents were Marjorie "Maj" Alice (née Farrow) and John Atholwood "Atty" Douglas. He was baptised a Catholic, and his family also included a younger sister, Terree. When Douglas was six, Maj left the family and he and Terree went to be raised by Atty's parents. He received his education at Cashmere Primary School, Northland School, and Wellington College. His early jobs included a woolclasser and wharf worker, before becoming a truck driver.

He married Lesley Winter in 1956, and they had four children. They divorced in 1986. Douglas said in a 2000s interview that he was "wasn't a particularly faithful husband on a couple of occasions" which he regretted.

== Union career ==
After starting work as a truck driver, his father who was also a truck driver insisted Douglas attend a meeting of the Wellington Drivers' Union. In about a year, he was on its executive, and when we was 23 he was elected its president, the youngest president of any trade union in New Zealand history. He negotiated on behalf of workers with companies for those workers' pay and rights.

Douglas was the secretary of the Federation of Labour from 1979 to 1988, serving with president Jim Knox. In this role, many unions asked him to negotiate with employers on their behalf. In 1988, Knox retired and Douglas became president.

In 1988, following the effects of economic reforms known as Rogernomics, the three branches of the trade union movement amalgamated into one organisation, the New Zealand Council of Trade Unions. Douglas was its first president. He proposed a compact with the government whereby wage increases were limited to two percent plus further increases linked to productivity. Many trade unionists felt that this signalled he had sold out to business interests. He was also blamed by many for not leading a general strike against the Employment Contracts Act 1991, which gutted the power of the trade union movement. Douglas held the CTU presidency until he retired from the role in 1999.

He also played a prominent role in the global union movement with roles as president of both the Asia-Pacific Regional Organisation of the International Confederation of Free Trade Unions and the International Centre for Trade Union Rights.

== Political party involvement ==
Early in his career, Douglas was anti-communist. He was influenced by communists in the labour movement, and joined the Communist Party in 1960. He said that the decision to join came from the 1960 New Zealand rugby union tour of South Africa for which Māori players were banned from playing. Douglas travelled to Hong Kong, Japan, and China in 1964, meeting Chairman Mao and learning about communist China. He was a Marxist, and faced constant accusations that he was a militant communist seeking to overthrow the country. When the Communist Party split in two in 1963, he went with the Socialist Unity Party which followed Soviet communism, as opposed to the remaining Communist Party which followed Chinese communism. He continued to visit various communist countries, being invited to the Soviet Union, East Germany, and Cuba, through the 1970s and 1980s. Douglas supported and defended Stalin's regime. However, Russel Hunter, a general manager of NZ Freighters, said of Douglas as a union representative, "regardless of his political interests... he talked you about the case that was on the table... and got the best for his people".

Douglas was one of the few publicly declared members of the Socialist Unity Party in the 1970s and 1980s, and was at the forefront of publicly defending the party. Prime Minister Robert Muldoon regularly railed against what he saw as the dangerous influence of communists and trade unions, and there were public marches against these groups. Muldoon saw Douglas as a malign influence in the union movement and often sought to discredit him as a Soviet puppet. In 1980 Muldoon expelled the Soviet ambassador to New Zealand for allegedly providing funds to the Socialist Unity Party. In an interview in the 2000s, Douglas said of Muldoon, "while he had this public persona of being antagonistic, whenever we met he was very polite and he gave me the respect my position as secretary of the Federation of Labour deserved."

Because of his political beliefs, Douglas's wife and children received abusive phone calls and death threats. According to Douglas, the Young Nats set up a group to phone his house every half hour every weekend to abuse whoever answered.

Douglas stood for parliament in the safe Labour seat of Porirua in the 1972 election, 1975 election and 1978 election, receiving 68, 46 and 70 votes respectively.

The Socialist Unity Party split in 1991. Party president Bill Andersen fell out with Douglas over tactics and left to form the Socialist Party of Aotearoa. Both parties subsequently disappeared.

== Board roles and local government ==
Douglas was first appointed to a board in 1987, when trade minister Mike Moore appointed him to the Market Development Board. Douglas served on boards of Air New Zealand, NZ Post, Positively Wellington, NZ Trade and Enterprise, New Zealand Rugby Union and Healthcare NZ. He was elected to the Capital and Coast District Health Board, sitting from 2001 to 2010, and was its chair. He was the president of the Titahi Bay Golf Club, and champion golfer Michael Campbell described Douglas as a mentor. He was also a Porirua Licensing trustee from 2001 to 2007.

Douglas was elected as a Porirua City councillor in 1998 and served six terms.

== Later life ==
In the 2000s, Douglas had gastric bypass surgery to address weight issues, and lost 70 kg.

In the 1999 New Year Honours, Douglas was appointed a Member of the Order of New Zealand (ONZ). He was awarded an honorary degree (LLD) by Victoria University of Wellington in 1999. A road in the suburb of Aotea is named after him in honour of his service to Porirua.

Douglas died in Wellington on 14 September 2022, aged 86 years. Acting Prime Minister Grant Robertson paid tribute to Douglas, saying that "he never wavered from his support of working people and commitment to their rights and successes". Acting Minister for Workplace Relations and Safety Priyanca Radhakrishnan said many advancements in worker rights could be traced back to Douglas' leadership.

== Notes ==
Trade union offices
| Preceded by Jim Knox | President of the New Zealand Council of Trade Unions; 1987–1999 | Succeeded by Ross Wilson |
| Preceded by Gopeshwar | President of the ICFTU Asia-Pacific Regional Organisation; 1994–2000 | Succeeded by Sharan Burrow |
