= Jenny Brash =

New Zealand mayor

Jenny Brash QSO
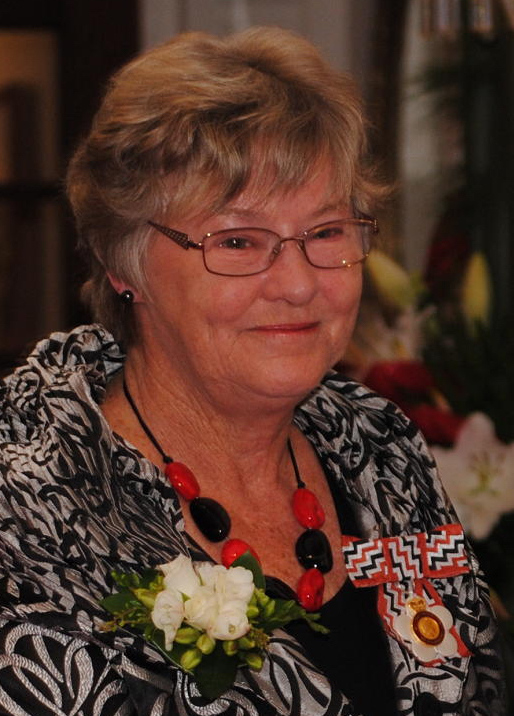
- Brash in 2011

3rd Mayor of Porirua
- In office 1998–2010
- Preceded by: John Burke
- Succeeded by: Nick Leggett

Personal details
- Born: December 1946 (age 79) Christchurch, New Zealand

Jennifer Sylvia Brash QSO (born December 1946) is a former New Zealand local government politician. In a career spanning nearly 40 years, she was mayor of Porirua from 1998 to 2010 having previously served as a Porirua city councillor. After retiring as mayor she served for the twelve years from 2010 to 2022 as councillor for Porirua–Tawa on the Greater Wellington Regional Council.

== Porirua City Council ==
Brash was first elected as a Northern Ward councillor in 1983 and held that role until 1989. She was elected in 1995 for another three-year term and was elected as mayor for the first time in 1998.

Brash last contested the mayoralty in October 2007 against four other candidates. She received 6101 votes, more than twice as many as the next candidate. She retired from the mayoralty at the 2010 election. She endorsed the mayoral campaign of councillor Nick Leggett, who was elected in October 2010 as her successor.

She campaigned for the construction of the Transmission Gully Motorway. Brash was the Porirua representative on the Wellington Regional Transport Committee when it was formed in 2008.

== Greater Wellington Regional Council ==
In October 2010, Brash was elected to the Greater Wellington Regional Council as one of two councillors for the Porirua–Tawa constituency. Her priorities in the election campaign were transport and the environment. She was re-elected in 2013, 2016 and 2019. As a regional councillor, she supported the dredging of Porirua Harbour to remove a build-up of silt on the harbour floor, although reports in 2012 and 2017 found that dredging would not solve the problem. She did not contest the local elections in 2022.

== Community involvement ==
At the close of her mayoralty, she successfully stood for election to the Porirua Community Trust. She is a supporter of the NZ Flag.com Trust, preferring a silver fern as the symbol on the New Zealand flag over the current design, which is too close to the Australian flag for her.

== Honours ==
In the 2011 New Year Honours, Brash was appointed a Companion of the Queen's Service Order, for services to local-body affairs.

Political offices
| Preceded by John Burke | Mayor of Porirua; 1998–2010 | Succeeded by Nick Leggett |
