= John Burke (mayor) =

New Zealand mayor

John Burke QSO JP
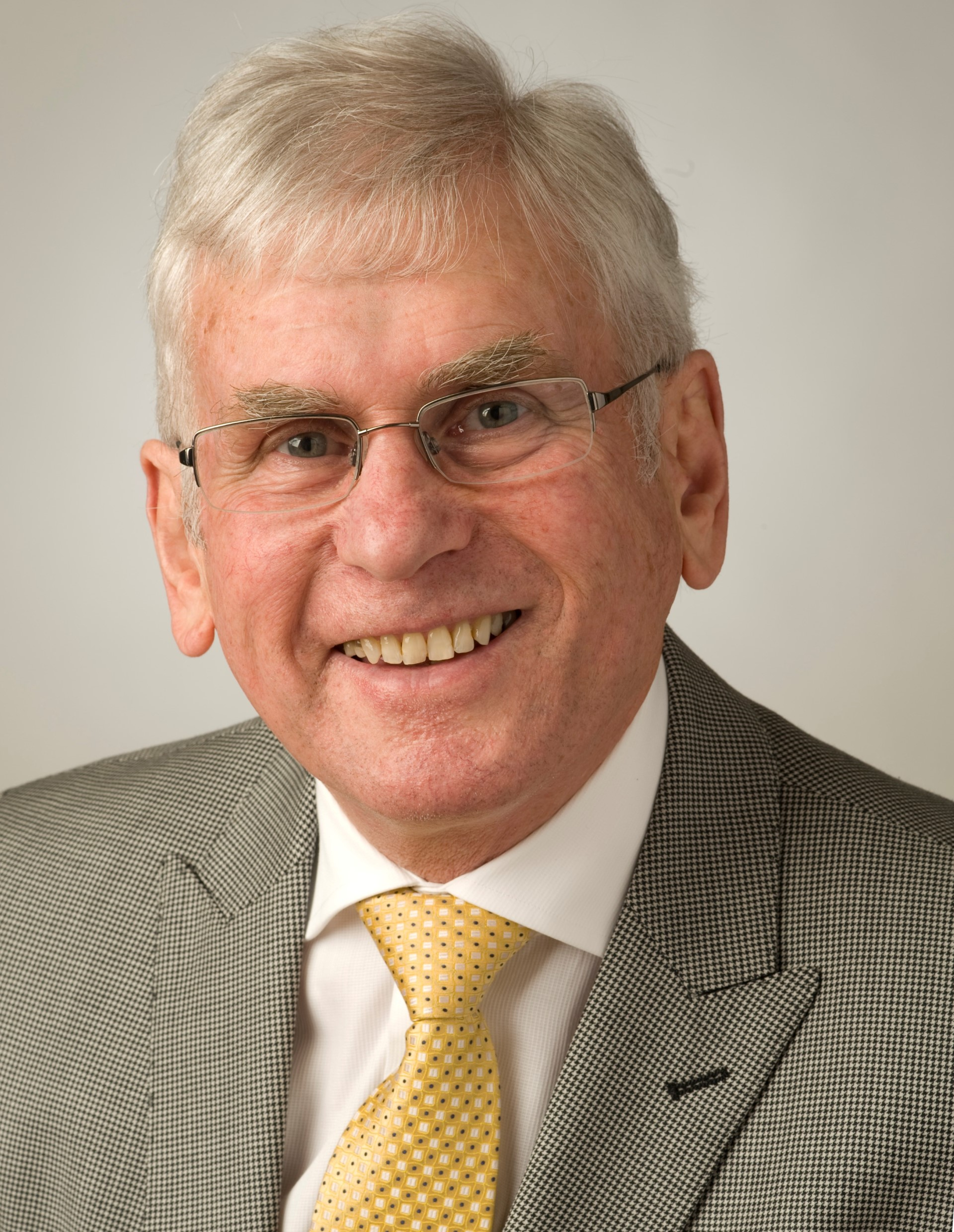
- Burke in 2024

2nd Mayor of Porirua
- In office 1983–1998
- Preceded by: Whitford Brown
- Succeeded by: Jenny Brash

Personal details
- Born: John Brian Burke; 6 February 1946 (age 80) Invercargill, New Zealand
- Party: Labour
- Spouse: Linda Burke

John Brian Burke QSO JP (born 6 February 1946) is a former mayor of Porirua City, Wellington Region, New Zealand. Prior to his time as mayor from 1983 to 1998, he served 12 years as a city councillor with six years from 1977 to 1983 as deputy mayor. After a 15-year absence from the city council, in 2013 and 2016 he stood for election as a city councillor in the eastern ward, and was elected. In September 2019 Burke announced he would not be seeking re-election, ending 48 years of continuous public office which began in 1971.

== Early life ==
Burke was born in Invercargill on 6 February 1946, the twelfth of his parents' fourteen children. He attended St Joseph's Convent before going onto Marist Primary School and then Marist Brothers High School. After leaving school he was employed by the New Zealand Post Office and moved to Tītahi Bay with his family when he transferred to Post Office headquarters in Wellington in 1968.

== Career ==
Burke was first elected a Porirua city councillor in 1971 and was re-elected until 1983. He became deputy mayor in 1977 and remained in that position until he was elected mayor in 1983. In 1974 he was elected to the Hutt Valley Energy Board, becoming chairman in 1986 and continuing to serve in that role until the then government abolished publicly elected power boards in 1990. He has remained continuously in public office for 48 years and was at the time of his retirement, the longest serving person in public office in the Wellington region. He has also served on the boards of national organisations including Sister Cities New Zealand (national president), the Electricity Supply Association (vice president), Local Government New Zealand (national councillor), The New Zealand Gas Association (board member), The Community Gaming Association (chairman) and the New Zealand Licensing Trusts Association (national president).

Burke was elected mayor of Porirua City in 1983 and retired from that role in 1998.

He is a former Hutt Mana Charitable Trustee, has chaired the trust on several occasions and also chaired the Porirua Community Trust and the Mana Community Grants Foundation. He also served as a Wellington Regional Councillor from 2007 to 2010.

During his time as mayor, Burke was invited to address international conferences on the topics of local government in New Zealand and on the benefits of sister city programmes in the United States of America, Japan, Israel and Australia. Also in 1991 he addressed the New Zealand Society of Accountants Public Sector annual conference on the subject of local government financial reforms.

In the 1989 Queen's Birthday Honours, Burke was made a Companion of the Queen's Service Order for public services, and the following year he received the New Zealand 1990 Commemoration Medal.

During Burke's time as Porirua's mayor from 1983 to 1998, he oversaw a significant transformation in Porirua's reputation and major commercial growth of the city. Burke was also responsible for leading significant commercial development in Porirua and for bringing the communities of Pauatahanui and Whitby into the city. Much of the continuing economic growth in Porirua today is credited to the Burke leadership of Porirua City.

Following his retirement from the mayoralty, Burke worked in real estate from 1999 to 2019.

== Personal life ==
In 1967, Burke married Linda Christina Horton, and the couple went on to have two sons.

== Honorific eponym ==
In 2012, John Burke Drive in Porirua's Aotea sub-division was named in his honour.

== Positions held ==
- President Porirua City Rugby League Club (1976–1980)
- Mayor of Porirua City (1983–1998)
- Deputy Mayor of Porirua (1977–1983)
- Porirua City Councillor (1971–1983) (2013 to 2019)
- Member of the Hutt Valley Energy Board (1974–1990)
- Chairman of the Hutt Valley Energy Board (1986–1990)
- Member of the Wellington Harbour Board (1980–1983)
- Member of the Porirua Licensing Trust Board (1989-2007)
- Patron Trust Porirua City Brass (1989-1999)
- Chairman of the Hutt Mana Energy Trust (1992-1998)
- President Sister Cities New Zealand (1996-1998)
- Chairman of the Hutt Mana Charitable Trust (2000–2001) (2007–2010)
- President of the Trust Porirua City Brass (2002 to 2025)
- President of the Porirua Licensing Trust (2001–2007)
- Greater Wellington Regional Councillor (2007–2010)
- Trustee of the Porirua Community Trust (2007–2019)
- Chairman of the Porirua Community Trust (2007–2013)
- Member of the Mana Community Grants Foundation (2003–2019)
- Chairman of the Mana Community Grants Foundation (2003–2013)
- President New Zealand Licensing Trusts Association (2011–2013)
- Patron of the Titahi Bay Surf Life Saving Club (2011–present)
- Patron of the Plimmerton Croquet Club (2011–2019)
- Patron of the Titahi Bay Horticultural Society (1999–2016)
- Life Member of the New Zealand Licensing Trusts Association 2014
- Life Member of Porirua City Brass 2026

== Notes ==
Political offices
Preceded by Whitford Brown	Mayor of Porirua; 1983–1998	Succeeded by Jenny Brash
