= Porirua Central =

Central business district of Porirua

Coordinates: 41.138346°S 174.841055°E

- Suburb
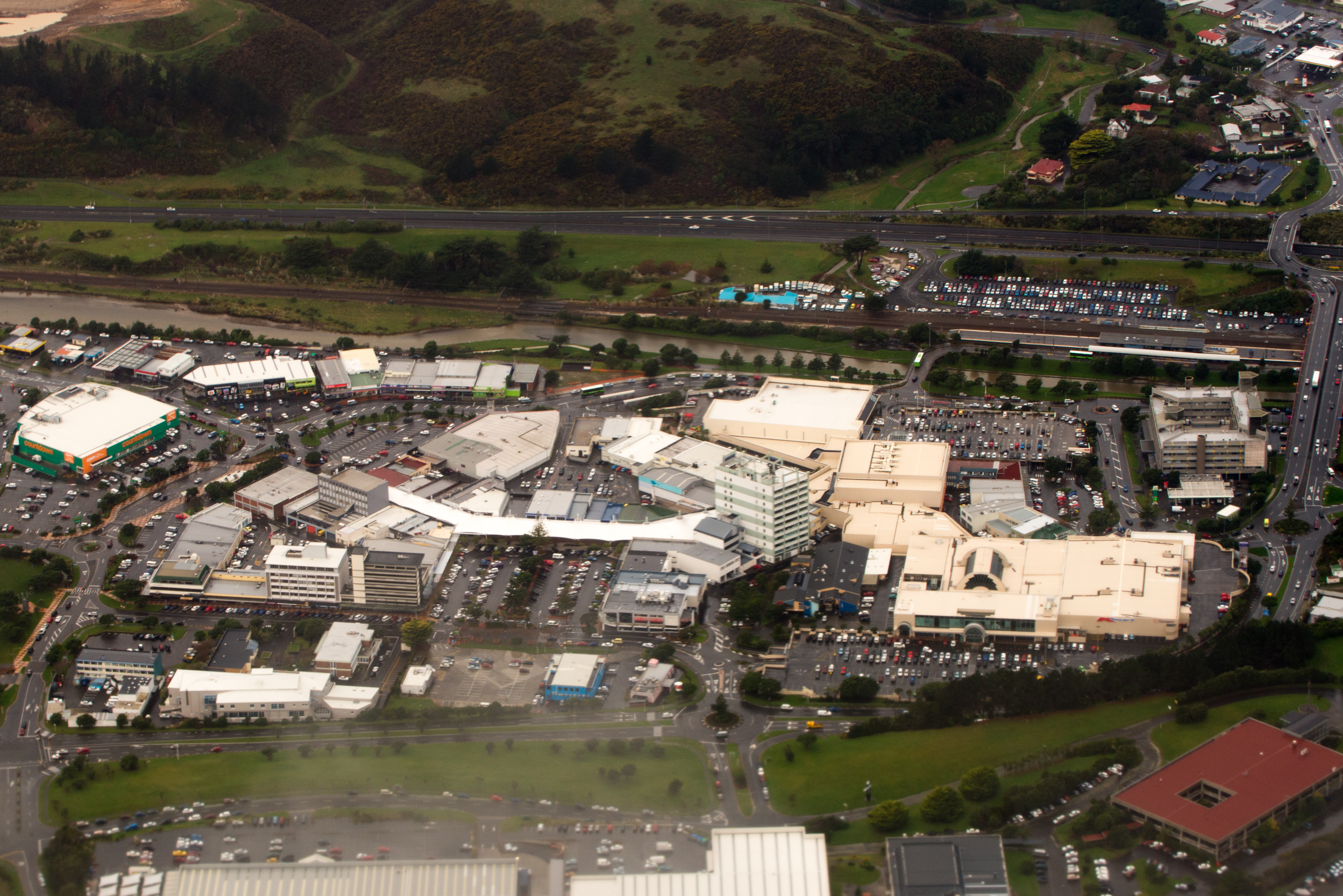
- Viewed from west in 2013. In upper right with the crowded parking lot is Porirua Station. North City Shopping Centre is on right (tan coloured building with Kmart and Farmer's logo). State Highway 1 (SH 1N) and railway are at top. Green-walled building on left is a Countdown supermarket.
- Interactive map of Porirua Central
- Country: New Zealand
- City: Porirua City
- Local authority: Porirua City Council
- Electoral ward: Onepoto General Ward; Porirua Māori Ward

Area
  - Land: 673 ha (1,660 acres)

Population (June 2025)
  - Total: 1,220
  - Density: 181/km^{2} (470/sq mi)

Takapūwāhia	(Porirua Harbour)	Aotea
Elsdon	Porirua Central	Cannons Creek
Kenepuru	Linden	Rānui

Porirua Central is the central business district and central suburb of Porirua, in the Wellington region of New Zealand's North Island.

== Demographics ==
Porirua Central statistical area, which also includes Kenepuru, covers 6.73 km^{2} (2.60 sq mi). It had an estimated population of 1,220 as of June 2025, with a population density of 181 people per km^{2}.

Historical population
Year	Pop.	±% p.a.
2006	366	—
2013	435	+2.50%
2018	261	−9.71%
2023	1,002	+30.87%

Porirua Central had a population of 1,002 in the 2023 New Zealand census, an increase of 741 people (283.9%) since the 2018 census, and an increase of 567 people (130.3%) since the 2013 census. There were 534 males, 468 females, and 3 people of other genders in 339 dwellings. 3.0% of people identified as LGBTIQ+. The median age was 38.7 years (compared with 38.1 years nationally). There were 123 people (12.3%) aged under 15 years, 204 (20.4%) aged 15 to 29, 411 (41.0%) aged 30 to 64, and 264 (26.3%) aged 65 or older.

People could identify as more than one ethnicity. The results were 57.2% European (Pākehā); 14.7% Māori; 9.6% Pasifika; 28.1% Asian; 1.8% Middle Eastern, Latin American and African New Zealanders (MELAA); and 2.1% other, which includes people giving their ethnicity as "New Zealander". English was spoken by 95.2%, Māori by 3.9%, Samoan by 3.9%, and other languages by 25.4%. No language could be spoken by 3.0% (e.g. too young to talk). The percentage of people born overseas was 40.7, compared with 28.8% nationally.

Religious affiliations were 46.1% Christian, 7.8% Hindu, 2.1% Islam, 1.2% Māori religious beliefs, 2.1% Buddhist, and 2.1% other religions. People who answered that they had no religion were 33.8%, and 6.0% of people did not answer the census question.

Of those at least 15 years old, 309 (35.2%) people had a bachelor's or higher degree, 351 (39.9%) had a post-high school certificate or diploma, and 219 (24.9%) people exclusively held high school qualifications. The median income was $37,700, compared with $41,500 nationally. 129 people (14.7%) earned over $100,000 compared to 12.1% nationally. The employment status of those at least 15 was 378 (43.0%) full-time, 84 (9.6%) part-time, and 18 (2.0%) unemployed.

== Economy ==
=== Retail ===
North City Shopping Centre opened in Porirua Central in 1990. It has an area of 8,100 m^{2}, 1100 carparks, and 102 stores, including Farmers, Kmart, New World and Reading Cinemas.
