= State housing in New Zealand =

System of low-cost rental public housing

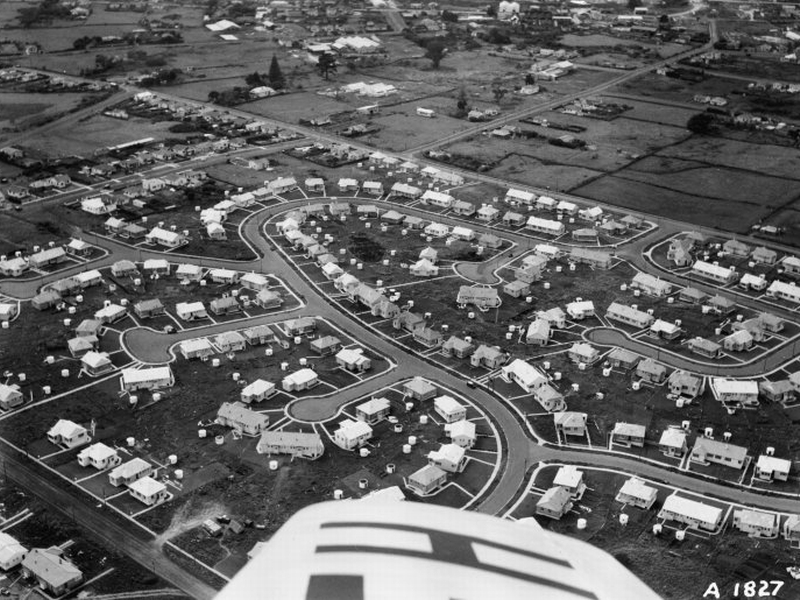
Unlike public housing in many other countries, much of the New Zealand state housing of the 20th century was in the form of detached houses similar to the typical Kiwi house. Aerial photograph of a 1947 development in Oranga, Auckland.

State housing is a system of public housing in New Zealand, offering low-cost rental housing to residents on low to moderate incomes. Some 69,000 state houses are managed by Kāinga Ora – Homes and Communities, most of which are owned by the Crown. In excess of 31,000 former state houses exist, which are now privately owned after large-scale sell-offs during recent decades. Since 2014, state housing has been part of a wider social housing system, which also includes privately owned low-cost housing.

An archetypal 1930s and 1940s state house is a detached two- or three-bedroom cottage-style house, with weatherboard or brick veneer cladding, a steep hipped tile roof, and multi-paned timber casement windows. Thousands of these houses were built across New Zealand as state housing, and as private housing after World War II, when the Government started selling their drawings and plans in an attempt to hasten housing construction. These houses, also known as "ex-state houses" to distinguish them from modern state housing, have a reputation of being well-built and are very sought after by real estate buyers, especially after the leaky homes crisis of the 1990s and 2000s hit buyer confidence in newer stock.

== History ==
=== The Liberal Government ===
Urban working-class housing in New Zealand in the 19th century was of poor quality, with overcrowding, flimsy construction, little public space, often-polluted water, and lack of facilities for disposal of rubbish or effluent. Local bodies were not interested in enforcing existing regulations, such as minimum street widths, which might have improved housing, or in prosecuting slum landlords.

The Liberal Government, first elected in 1890, believed that the slums would cease to be a problem as workers moved to the country to become farmers or small town merchants. Instead, the cities continued to grow. A parallel idea of making Government-owned land on the outskirts of cities available for workers to create smallholdings failed to gain traction because the cheap commuter trains which might have transported them to their workplaces were not established, and the Government did not provide loans for building or allow the purchase of freehold land in the areas.

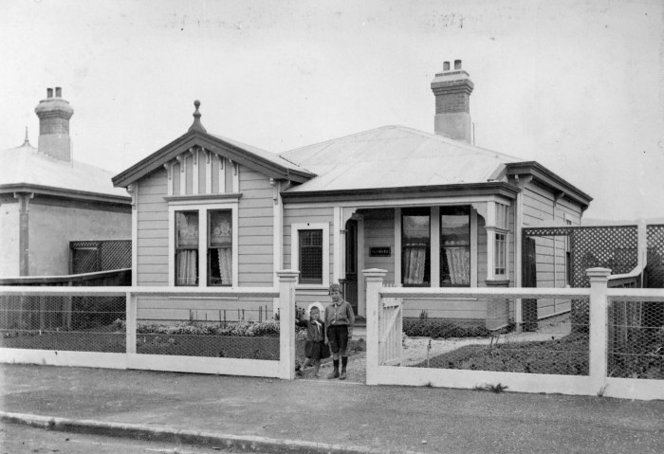
13 Patrick Street in Petone was one of the first houses constructed under the 1905 Workers' Dwellings Act

Prime Minister Richard Seddon introduced the Workers' Dwelling Act in 1905 to provide well-built suburban houses for workers who earned less than £156 per annum. He argued that these houses would prevent the decline of living standards in New Zealand and increase the money available to workers without increasing the costs to employers. By breaking private landlords' control over rental housing, housing costs for everyone would decline. The bill passed by 64 votes to 2, despite criticism over the cost of the scheme, the distance the houses would be from workplaces, particularly ports, and the lack of provision for Māori. Seddon estimated that 5,000 houses would be built under the scheme.

The Act allowed for workers to rent weekly, lease for 50 years with a right of renewal, or lease with the right to buy over a period ranging between 25 and 41 years. In practice, the Government did not initially advertise the weekly rental but emphasised the lease with the right to buy. The Act specified that workers could be male or female, but women were discouraged from applying for the houses because the Government was concerned that "houses of ill-repute" might be established.

The standard of materials and construction was high because the Government was determined that the houses would not become slums. The Act specified that the rent was to be 5% per annum of the capital cost of the house and land, together with insurance and rates. The initial specification was that houses should cost no more than £300, but this was raised to £350–400, depending on construction materials, by the 1905 Amendment Act. This resulted in weekly rents ranging between 10s 6d and 12s 7d. (Note: These specific rents apply to the houses constructed at Petone.) All the houses had five rooms—a living room, a kitchen/dining room, and three bedrooms—as well as a bathroom. This allowed boys and girls to be given separate bedrooms from each other. Some houses were built of wood, some of concrete, and some of brick.

Twenty-five houses were built in the Heretaunga Settlement at Petone in 1906, with another nine built later. Seven different designs by New Zealand architects were used to avoid the feeling of a "workers' barrarcks". Some were single-storeyed and some were two-storeyed. Initially only four applications were received to lease them. Workers could reach Wellington with a 20-minute walk followed by a 30-minute train ride, but the train cost another two shillings a week. This left a family no better off than continuing to rent in Wellington. The Government was forced to allow weekly tenancies and to raise the maximum income level (Note: The 1906 Workers' Dwelling Amendment Act raised the limit from £156 to £200 per year.) to attract families to the houses. Other settlements such as the one in Belleknowes, Dunedin, also had trouble finding renters. Houses built in the central suburbs, such as the eight in Newtown and twelve in Sydenham, attracted tenants much more readily.

After Seddon's death in 1906, the Government Advances to Workers Act allowed urban landowners to borrow up to £450 from the Government at low interest rates to build their own houses. This proved much more popular than the state housing system. A total of only 126 houses were built under the Workers' Dwellings Act by 1910. A replacement Workers' Dwelling Act in that year allowed landless urban workers to build a house on a deposit of just £10. While it still allowed for workers to rent or lease their homes from the Government, applicants who were willing to buy were favoured. The state houses were sold by the Reform Government from 1912 onwards.

=== The First Labour Government ===
At the time it was elected in 1935, the First Labour Government had no plans to introduce state housing. It nationalised the Mortgage Corporation set up in 1935 by the Coalition Government to provide low-interest housing loans.

Following a campaign against slums by the newspaper New Zealand Truth, and the realisation that lending for mortgages was not effective to provide housing to replace them, the Finance Minister Walter Nash announced in the 1936 Budget that 5000 state houses would be built. The houses would be provided by private enterprise, with a Department of Housing Construction set up to oversee the building and the State Advances Corporation to manage the houses. The Government intended not only to provide housing, but to stimulate jobs and manufacturing with the construction of the houses, which were to be built from New Zealand materials as far as possible.

MP John A. Lee was responsible for the programme (and for the use of cheap Reserve Bank 1% credit), but as he was an undersecretary rather than a minister he had limited authority. Sir James Fletcher of Fletcher Construction was a major participant.

The houses were built in the suburbs, not in the inner cities where the slums were. This was in part because the cost of building in the inner cities was higher, and in part, because the Government believed that children were better raised in suburban sections rather than on the streets. The urban poor also were largely unable to afford the rents for the new state houses. The Government favoured married couples with at least one child as tenants to encourage an increase in the birth rate. Māori were excluded, in part because they could not afford the rentals, but also because Government ministers believed the races should be kept apart.

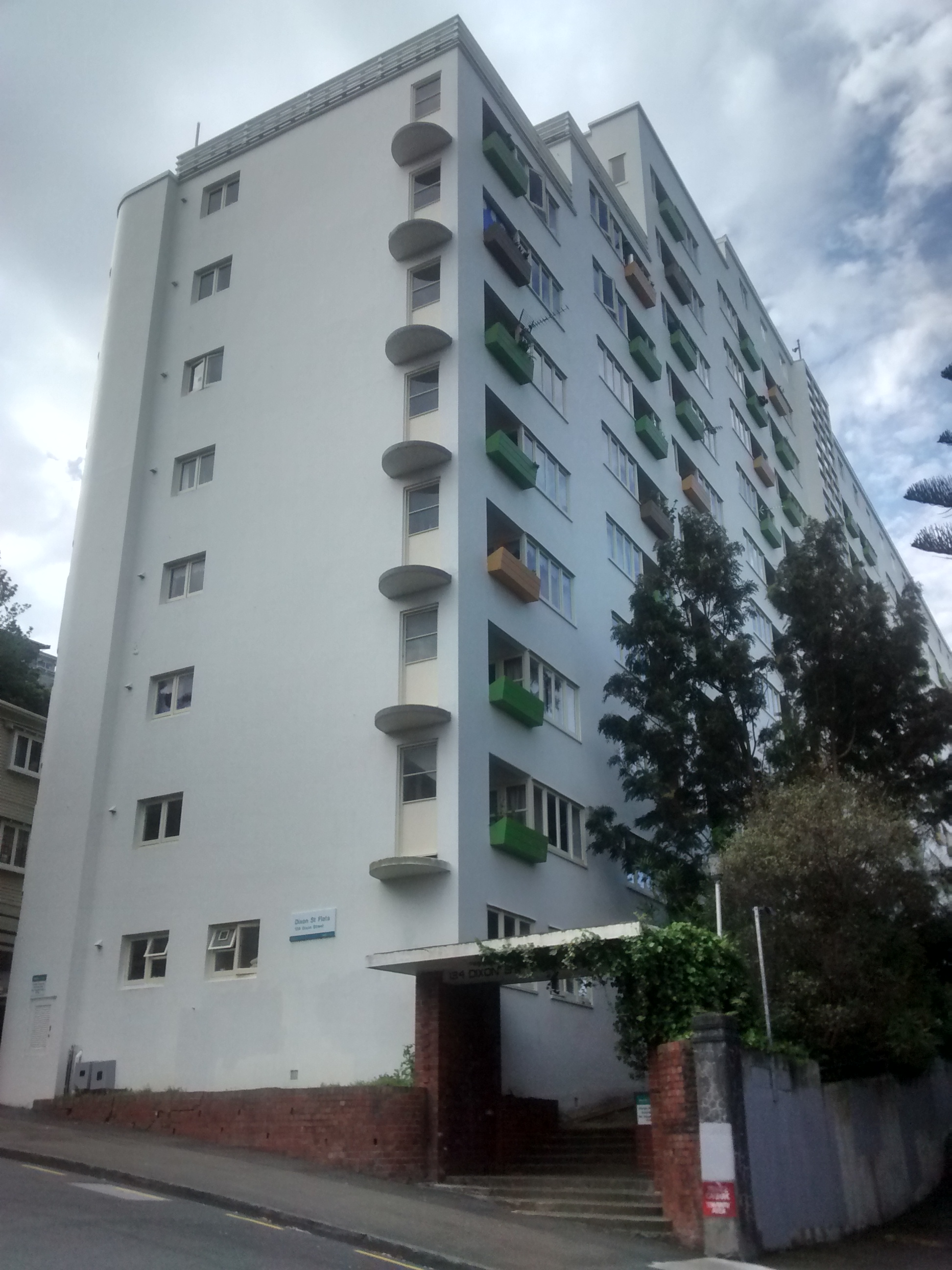
The Dixon Street Flats in Wellington

Almost all of the state houses built by the Labour Government were detached, with some land on which vegetables could be grown and perhaps a few animals kept. A few were semi-detached, with two or four houses sharing a section. Only about 1.5% of the 30,000 houses constructed by 31 March 1949 were in blocks of flats, all of them in Auckland or the greater Wellington area. The first to be built were the low rise family flats in the Wellington suburb of Berhampore and the largest block was the ten-storey Dixon Street Flats in central Wellington containing 115 one-bedroomed flats for couples and single people.

The first of the new state houses was completed at 12 Fife Lane in Miramar, Wellington, in 1937. The Prime Minister Michael Joseph Savage and several cabinet ministers carried furniture into the house and handed the keys to the tenants. For the opening of the first state house in each major city, a group of cabinet ministers repeated this ceremony. The first tenants, David and Mary McGregor, paid £1 10s 3d ($3.03) rent for 12 Fife Lane, about one-third of their £4 7s 9d ($8.78) weekly income.

The waiting list for state houses was 10,000 in February 1939. House building could not keep up with the demand and almost stopped in 1942 as resources were reallocated to meet the needs of the war effort. Although construction resumed in 1944, by the time the war ended in August 1945 the waiting list had grown to 30,000. The Government set up transit camps to provide interim accommodation for families waiting for state houses. Priority went to returned soldiers.

In 1944, the Department of Native Affairs produced a report on the poor housing conditions of Māori in the Auckland suburb of Panmure. This and similar reports caused a change of policy; the Government would now build state houses for Māori, to be jointly managed by the State Advances Corporation and the Department of Maori Affairs, which had been renamed in the interim. The new policy was to intersperse Māori and Pākehā (New Zealanders of European ancestry) households ("pepper-potting"), so that Māori could "adjust themselves ... to the pakeha way of living". A rare exception to the interspersal policy was in Waiwhetu in Lower Hutt, where state houses were built around a central marae.

Although the National Party had opposed state housing in the 1938 election campaign, suggesting that it was a step towards the nationalisation of private property, in 1949 it promised to continue building state houses but also to allow tenants to buy them. Most people wanted to own their own homes, and this policy helped National win the election.

=== 1930s and 1940s state house design ===
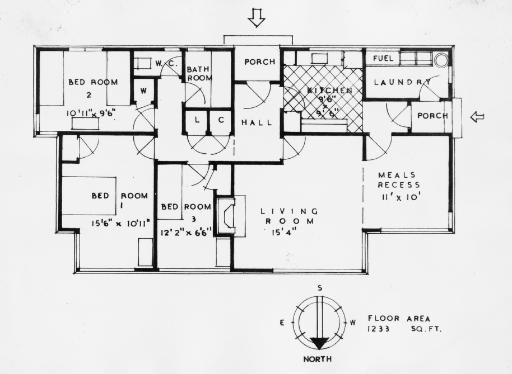
A 1930s state house layout. This is an early design with the meals recess in the living room; later state house plans moved the meals recess to the kitchen.

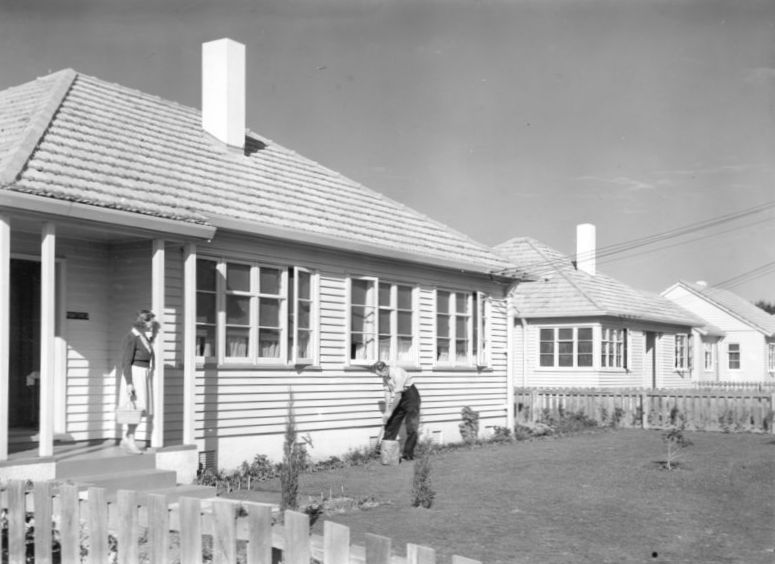
State houses at Arapuni, Waikato, showing many of the exterior features typical of 1930s and 1940s state houses.

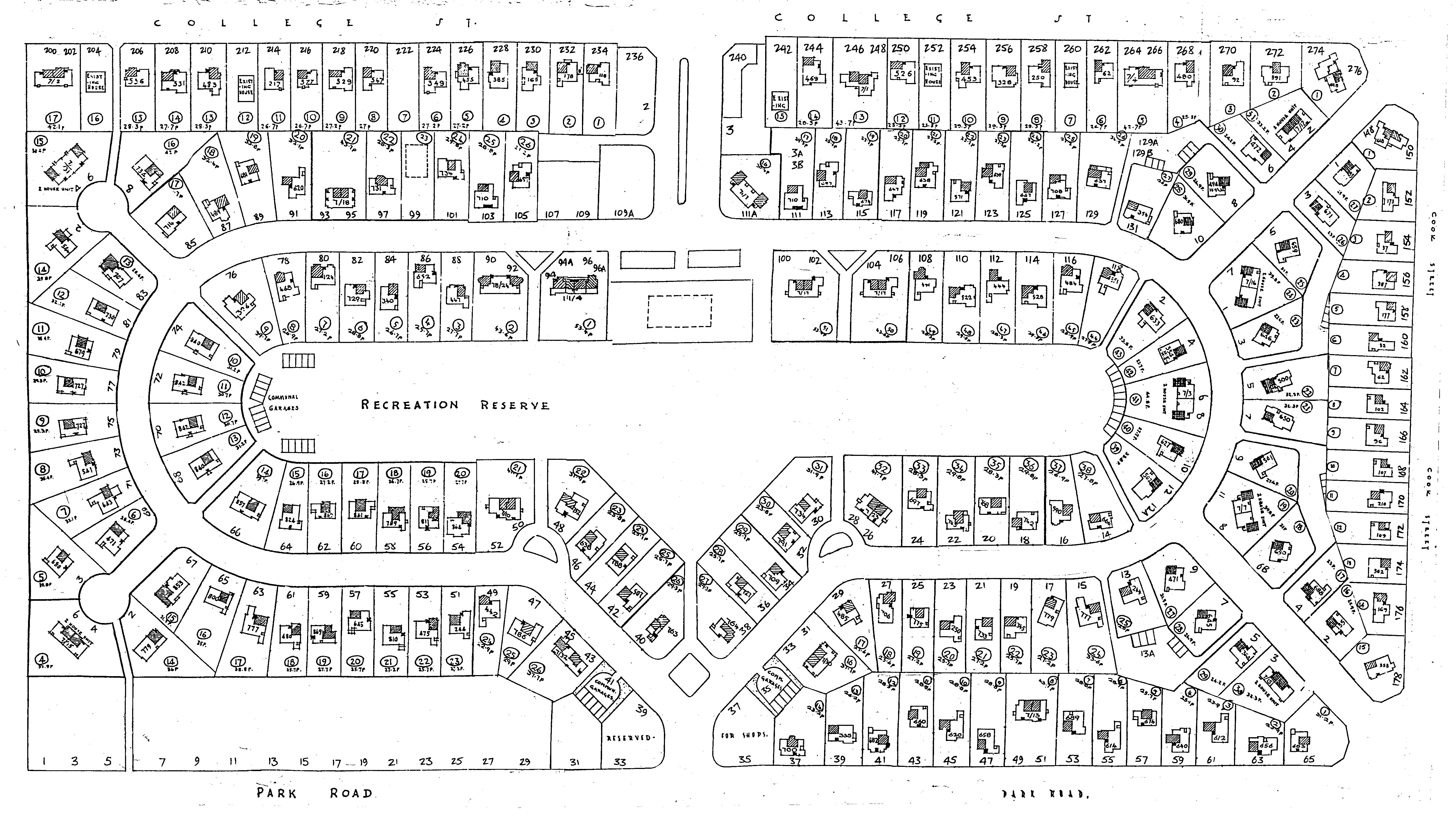
A layout plan for the Savage Crescent state housing precinct in Palmerston North. The precinct has 245 state houses, all built between 1938 and 1945.

The state houses were constructed using over 400 designs so that no two houses in a given area were identical. They were small by today's standards – the typical floor area was 81.9 m^{2} (882 sq ft) for a two-bedroom house and 98.0 m^{2} (1,055 sq ft) for a three-bedroom house. The houses had timber frames and floors supported by piles and a perimeter wall. Exterior cladding was typically timber weatherboard, brick veneer, or asbestos-cement sheets or shingles. Roofs were typically hip or gable with a steep pitch (30 degrees), and were clad with concrete or clay tiles, or asbestos-cement sheets. Windows on state houses were of the timber casement type, with three panes vertically in larger windows and two panes in smaller windows.

The living room was considered the social and recreational hub of the house; it was the largest room and faced north to catch the most possible sun. The kitchen faced east to catch the morning sun, while bedrooms faced either east, north or west to catch sun for part of the day. Where possible, the private zones of the bedrooms, bathroom and laundry were on a different side of the house from the public zones of the kitchen and living room. Often the kitchen, laundry, bathroom and toilet were grouped together to reduce plumbing costs. The first state houses had the dining area in the living room; after initial feedback from tenants, the dining area was moved to the kitchen. Although the original plans included space for a garage, this was not included in the houses that were built, but a tool shed was provided to encourage tenants to grow a vegetable garden. On sloping sites, the tool shed and the laundry were typically placed underneath the house.

Each state house had modern amenities for their time; bedrooms were equipped with built-in wardrobes, hot water was heated by an electric cylinder, and the kitchen was equipped with an electric range. In areas where electricity was not yet available, a chip heater on wetback and a coal range were installed. As washing machines and refrigerators were not commonplace in the 1930s and 1940s, the laundry was fitted with a copper boiler and two concrete tubs, while the kitchen was fitted with a food safe. Space heating was accomplished by an open fire in the living room – New Zealand's electricity supply was considered too unreliable for large-scale space heating before the 1950s.

=== 1950–1990 ===
In 1950, the waiting list for state houses was 45,000, and a total of 30,000 houses had been built. The National Government increased rents for new tenants to make state housing less desirable compared with private renting, and an income limit of £520 per annum was set to ensure that only those on fairly modest incomes could rent a state house. A points system was introduced to decide which applicants for houses had the greatest need. This system was refined in 1973 and continued until 1992. The Government also introduced the sale of state houses to their occupants in August 1950. They offered 40-year mortgages on a 5% deposit at 4% interest, or 3% if the tenant agreed to continuously own and occupy the property. Many tenants were content to continue to rent with their guaranteed tenancies. By 1957, about 30% of the available houses had sold, which was considerably less than the Government hoped.

During the 1950s, escalating building costs saw the standard of state housing construction fall. Suburbs of state houses built of cheaper building materials were built in greenfield areas. Houses were more uniform in design than individual, and there was a large increase in the proportion of duplex and multi-unit dwellings.

The Labour Government elected in 1957 stopped the promotion of state house sales, but the subsequent National Government of 1960 restored it. Three-storey apartment blocks known as Star Flats were built throughout New Zealand in the 1960s.

The policy of interspersing Māori and Pākehā tenants ceased in the 1970s. Māori became concentrated in the larger state housing suburbs.

In 1974, under the Third Labour Government, the State Advances Corporation, responsible for administration, and the Housing Division of the Ministry of Works, responsible for the construction of state houses, merged to form the Housing Corporation of New Zealand.

State house rental rates were fixed by the "fair rent" provisions of the 1955 Tenancy Act to reflect the capital cost of the house and the outgoings on it. While rents increased over the years, the rental was rebated according to the family's income and size. In 1974, the rents were fixed at the lower of the "fair rent" value or one-sixth of the household income. By the mid-1980s, the "fair rent" was about half the rental for an equivalent private property. The Third National Government of Robert Muldoon set a time limit for new tenants. After six years, they had a year to agree to buy the house or move out. The following Labour Government abandoned this system, but set rentals to a quarter of the household income.

The Papakainga scheme was introduced by the Fourth Labour Government in the late 1980s to assist rural Māori to build their own houses on their own iwi-owned land.

=== Market rentals ===
A peak of 70,000 state rental houses was reached in the early 1990s.

In 1991 the Fourth National Government raised state house rentals to "market levels" amid much controversy. The Housing Corporation was now expected to make a profit. At the same time, welfare payments were reduced. For those who could not afford the rent, the Department of Social Welfare would pay an accommodation supplement of 65 percent of the difference between the new rent and one-quarter of the household income. The intention was to encourage able-bodied people to look for jobs, to remove the advantage of living in a state house over living in private rental accommodation, and to force people living in houses larger than they needed to move to smaller ones.

For many state house tenants, the new policies reduced their standards of living. Foodbanks increased in number in state housing areas, and overcrowding became a problem as some families shared houses. Mounting opposition included a partial rent strike, organised by the State Housing Action Coalition (SHAC), during which tenants refused to pay more than 25% of their income in rent. In response, in 1996 the Government increased the accommodation supplement to 70 percent, and restored the idea of "social objectives" rather than profit for the Housing Corporation.

A Home Buy scheme was introduced from 1996 to 1999, which allowed tenants to buy their state home with a five percent deposit, an 85 percent loan from the Government, and a ten percent suspensory loan. 1,800 houses were sold under this scheme, and 10,000 more sold in this period. However protests continued, culminating in the high profile eviction of a SHAC rent striker during the 1999 election campaign.

=== State housing under the Fifth Labour Government ===
The Fifth Labour Government, elected in 1999, placed a moratorium on state house sales and re-established the income-related rents. In 2001, Housing New Zealand, the Housing Corporation, and part of the Ministry of Social Policy were combined into the Housing New Zealand Corporation, so that policy and administration for state housing are controlled by a single agency.

A program to modernise state houses was introduced after 1999. Existing houses were insulated, the layout was improved, and in many cases the kitchen and bathroom were replaced. A "Community Renewal" program, started in 2001, attempted to build supportive networks amongst residents of state housing areas, reduce crime and increase safety, and improve community services.

Rents were limited to 25 percent of net household income for tenants earning up to the rate of New Zealand Superannuation. For those earning more than the rate of NZ Super, rent was 25 percent on income up to the NZ Super rate, then 50 percent on income above that up to the property's market rent.

=== State housing under the Fifth National Government ===
The Fifth National Government, elected in 2008, carried out a programme of incremental reforms of state housing. In 2011, in the Auckland suburb of Glen Innes Housing New Zealand began a redevelopment process of 156 state properties. The redevelopment would leave 78 houses owned by Housing New Zealand and the rest sold privately. The redevelopment process sparked over two years of protests and scores of arrests, including of Mana Party leader Hone Harawira. In 2012 it closed Housing New Zealand's local offices to tenants and directed all enquiries to a call centre. Beginning in October 2013, the FirstHome scheme aimed to sell 100 homes a year to first home buyers. From 14 April 2014 onwards all state housing tenancies were to be reviewable, ending a previous "house for life" policy.

In January 2015, in his state of the nation speech, John Key announced plans to reduce the Government's involvement in providing social housing, with some of the responsibility for providing housing to be passed to community housing providers. As part of the plan, 2,000 state houses would be sold by January 2016, and up to 8,000 properties would be sold by 2017. Under the plan, community housing groups would have access to government funding for income-related rents. Policy officials' advice to the Government was that the policy had a number of risks, particularly around the capability of community housing providers to have the capacity to ramp up their services, and whether tenants could be protected from unfair treatment.

=== State housing under the Sixth Labour Government ===
The Sixth Labour Government, elected in 2017, formally moved to stop the sell-off of state houses by issuing an instruction to Housing New Zealand to cancel the sale of the homes in December 2017. The Ministry has listed pressures in the private rental market, population growth and decline in home ownership as key factors. Māori households were over-represented in social housing, making up 36 percent of tenants and 43 percent of the housing register.

In 2019, the Government combined KiwiBuild, Housing New Zealand and HLC into one new unit called Kāinga Ora. Kāinga Ora is to act as the landlord for the public housing stock, whilst also being a developer of both urban projects and housing. As of 2020, Kāinga Ora was producing 1,000 new houses per year for rent, accounting for 7% of the country's housing builds. Kāinga Ora also has the ability to give out first-time-home-buyer grants of up to $10,000.

=== State housing under the Sixth National Government ===
In mid-March 2024, Housing Minister Chris Bishop and Finance Minister Nicola Willis ordered Kāinga Ora to end the previous Labour Government's "Sustainable Tenancies Framework" and take disciplinary action against unruly tenants and those with overdue rent. The Government's announcement was criticised by Green Party housing spokesperson Tamatha Paul and Labour housing spokesperson Kieran McAnulty, who said that housing was a basic right and that increased evictions failed to address the housing shortage. By contrast, ACT Party leader David Seymour and Manurewa-Papakura Ward Councillor Daniel Newman welcomed the eviction of unruly state housing tenants. By late December 2024, a record 375 fines had been issued between 1 July and 31 October 2024 while 17 people had been evicted during that period. By comparison, 57 warnings had been issued during the 2022-2023 year and two evictions had occurred between 2022 and 2023.

In addition, the Government took steps to reduce the number of families living in emergency housing motels and move them into social housing under the "Priority One pathway." The Government also tightened the eligibility criteria for emergency housing applicants. By October 2024, the number of households living in emergency housing had dropped from 3,141 in December 2023 to 993. By December 2024, the number of households living in emergency housing had dropped to 591. While Associate Housing Minister Tama Potaka credited the Government's policies with moving 786 families and 1,608 children into state housing, McAnulty said that changing the eligibility criteria for emergency housing did not reduce its demand.

In early September 2025, The New Zealand Herald reported that the number of emergency housing grants had rapidly declined since the introduction of new rules in August 2024 allowing officials to decline grants if they believed a person did not qualify, had contributed to their immediate need, were not in an emergency situation or their need could be met in alternative ways. According to the Ministry of Social Development, the number of emergency housing grants had declined from a peak of 15,141 in June 2020 to 1,260 in June 2025. By comparison, the number of rejections had risen from 333 in May 2020 to 720 in June 2025. In Auckland, the number of emergency housing grants declined from 6,117 in June 2020 to 198 in June 2025; while the number of rejections rose from 186 in May 2020 to 276 in June 2025. Similarly in Wellington, the number of emergency grants declined from a peak of 1,392 in December 2020 to 84 in June 2025. Auckland-based charity "Kick Back" co-founder Aaron Hendry expressed concern that the tightened rules made it harder for vulnerable young people to access emergency housing while University of Otago public health associate professor Nevil Pierse expressed concerned that the tightened emergency housing criteria aggravated the plight of individuals struggling with stigma and shame.

== Notable state housing developments ==
=== Suburbs ===
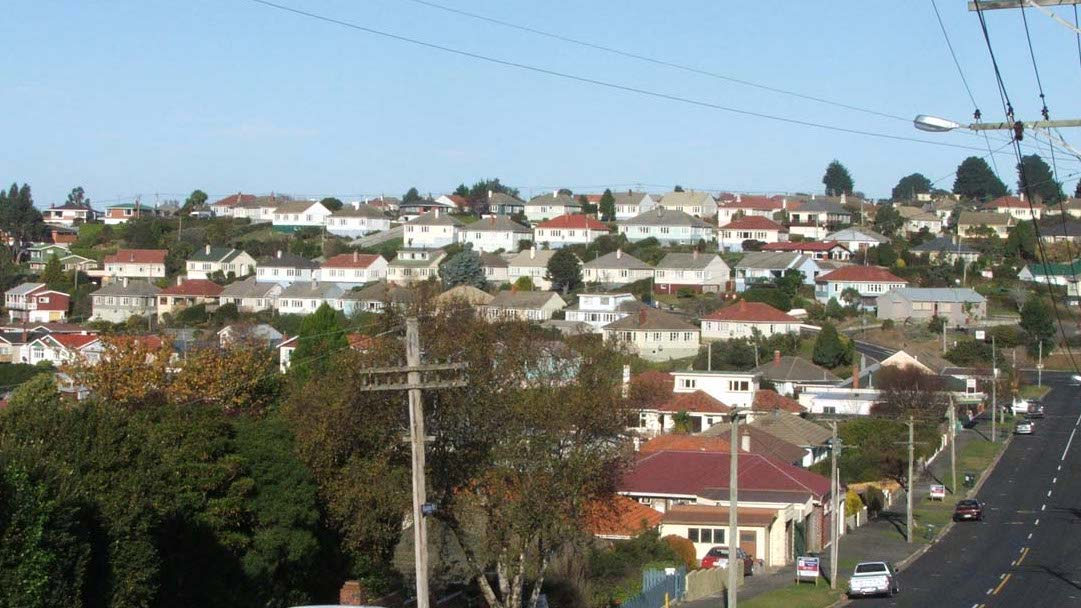
State housing in Corstorphine, Dunedin

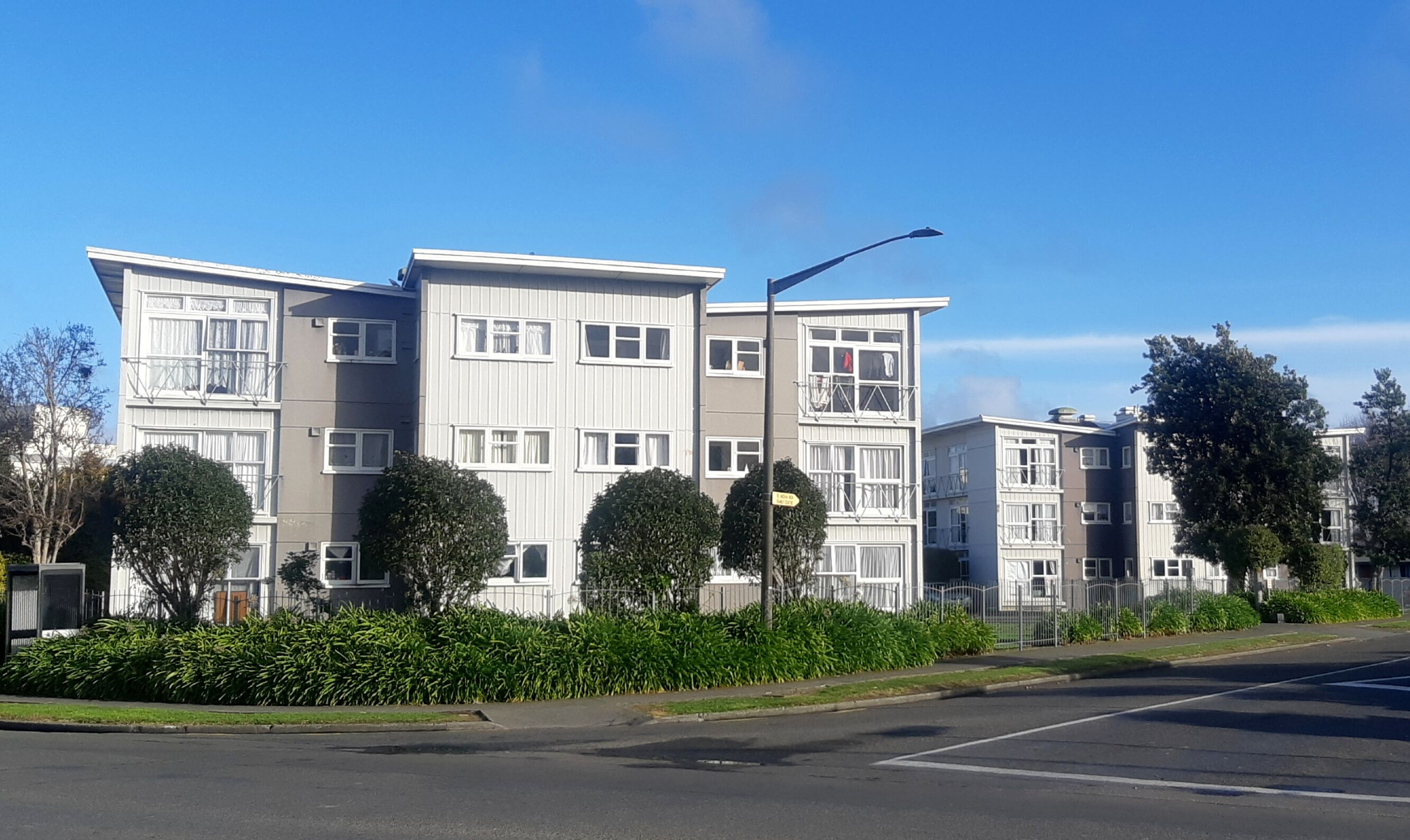
Two Star Flats in Highbury, Palmerston North, 2020

- Otangarei, Whangārei
- Waterview, Auckland
- Ōrākei, Auckland
- Wesley, Auckland
- Mount Roskill, Auckland
- Oranga, Auckland
- Glen Innes, Auckland
- Tāmaki, Auckland
- Māngere, Auckland
- Ōtāhuhu, Auckland
- Ōtara, Auckland
- Manurewa, Auckland
- Enderley, Hamilton
- Fairfield, Hamilton
- Hamilton East (Hayes Paddock area)
- Melville, Hamilton
- Fordlands, Rotorua
- Kaiti, Gisborne
- Maraenui, Napier
- Marfell, New Plymouth
- Roslyn, Palmerston North
- West End, Palmerston North (Savage Crescent area)
- Taitā, Lower Hutt
- Naenae, Lower Hutt
- Epuni, Lower Hutt
- Tītahi Bay, Porirua
- Porirua East, Porirua
- Cannons Creek, Porirua
- Waitangirua, Porirua
- Aranui, Christchurch
- Bryndwr, Christchurch
- Shirley, Christchurch
- Corstorphine, Dunedin
- Liberton, Dunedin
- Brockville, Dunedin

=== Apartment blocks ===
- Centennial Flats, Berhampore, Wellington (48× one-, two- and three-bedroom flats)
- Dixon Street Flats, Te Aro, Wellington (115× one-bedroom flats)
- Star Flats, nationwide (12× one- and two-bedroom flats)

== See also ==
- Housing in New Zealand
- Social welfare in New Zealand
- Ministry of Business, Innovation and Employment
- Housing New Zealand Corporation
- State Planning in Porirua (1940-1970)
- Railways Department's Housing Scheme

== Bibliography ==
- Fill, Barbara (1984). Seddon's State Houses: The Workers' Dwellings Act 1905 & the Heretaunga Settlement. New Zealand Historic Places Trust.
- Schrader, Ben (2000). "Chapter 8: Labour at Home". In Barbara Brookes (ed.). At Home in New Zealand. Bridget Williams Books. pp. 134–35. ISBN 1-877242-04-7.
- Schrader, Ben (2005). We Call it Home : A History of State Housing in New Zealand. Auckland: Reed. ISBN 9780790009971.
- Firth, Cedric (1949). State Housing in New Zealand. Wellington: Ministry of Works.
