= State planning in Porirua =

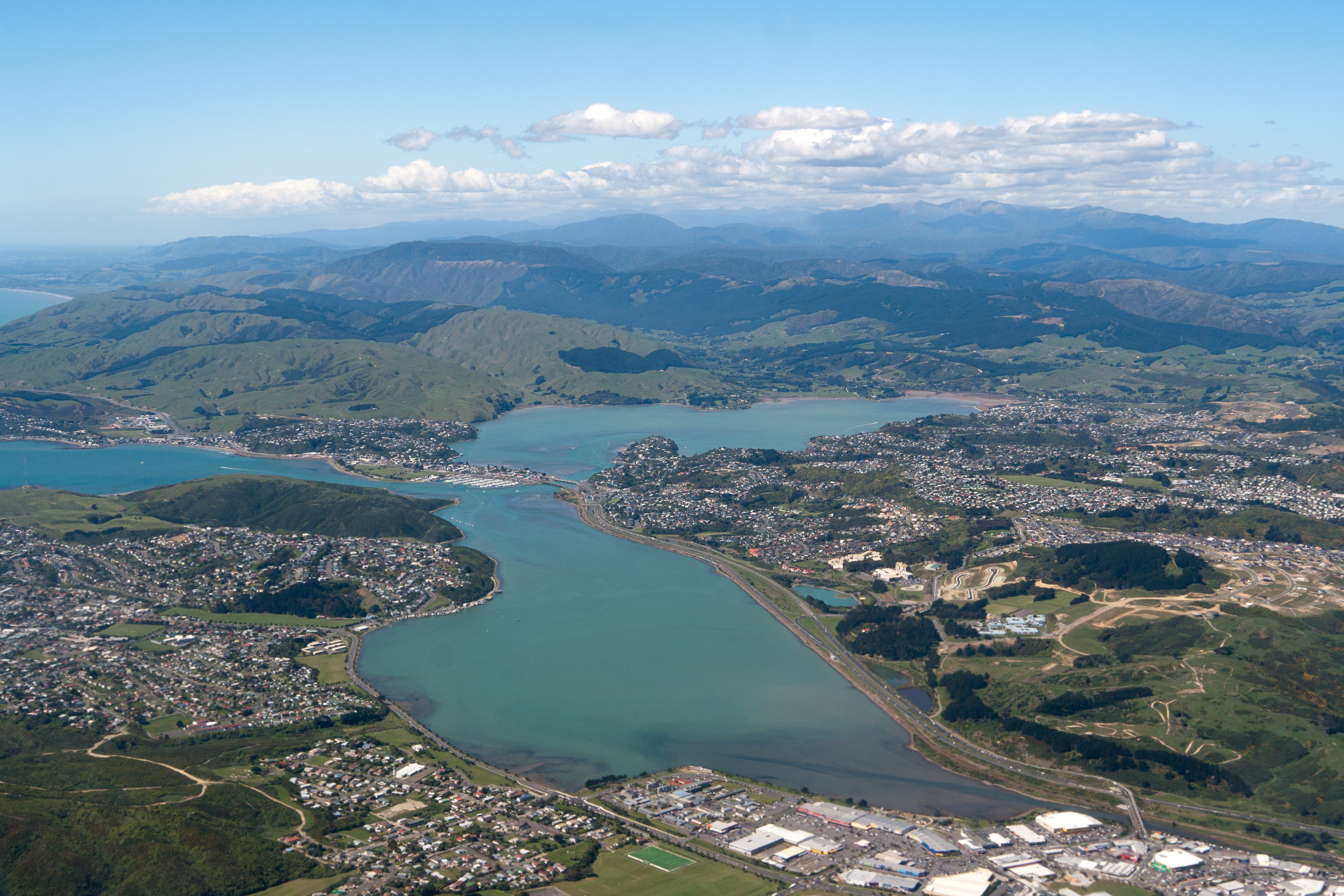
Aerial view of Porirua Harbour encompassing several State housing suburbs

In the post war era, a shortage of housing in Wellington led to a need for increased housing development. The satellite community of Porirua, 20 km from New Zealand's capital, Wellington, was a collection of planned suburban development to meet this demand. It has been described as 'a planning guinea pig’ where it would follow similar ideas and direction to the British New towns movement. Between the 1940s and 1970s it was planned and developed for 70,000 people. In the late 1950s and 1960s it would transform from a village to city. The Department of housing and construction and in particular when it was under the First Labour Government had a major role in its development. A large number of families, many of them migrants, flooded into Porirua’ into mostly State houses. By 1977, 78% of Porirua was State housing and it was the country's largest single concentration of public dwellings, (this dwindled to 41% in 2012). The population has increased from 5000 people in 1950 to 21000 in 1966 and 52,700 in 2012. The four main state-planned and housing estate suburbs of Porirua are Tītahi Bay, Porirua East, Cannons Creek, and Waitangirua.

== New towns movement influence ==
The initial attractiveness of turning an isolated valley into the suburban settlement of Porirua stemmed from notions of the garden city in Britain, which encapsulated a desire to improve social situations and outcomes for the ‘moral’ concerns of inner city life and find a town and country balance. Leardini & Gronert assert 'that the Labour Party, inspired by British housing schemes, immediately focused on building new houses away from the slum areas of the inner city’. The form of the Porirua settlement and reasons for development echoed these ideas. The 'Porirua city centre was designed around this British town format with clustering of commercial, retail and entertainment areas but separation of pedestrians and traffic’. Schrader suggests the reason for the garden city direction was explored in New Zealand was an ideological desire to link to the ‘mother country’ of Britain. Even though arguably New Zealand did not have the same substantive ‘slum’ concerns of other parts of the world such as Britain and closer neighbour Victoria in Australia. It was an ‘opportunity of preventing the condition of things which so disgraced British cities and which was responsible for so much misery, want, and squalor, especially among the masses’. Thus a trend towards low density ‘suburbanization and peri-urban development became more prominent after the war’.

Schrader argues that this narrative made its mark in New Zealand under the first Labour government in 1935 ‘with a massive state housing program, based on garden city principles’. They established a comprehensive programme for constructing State houses which provided thousands of New Zealanders with homes and substantially improved the quality of New Zealand’s housing stock’.Thus the New Zealand Government bought up large tracts of land in Porirua, and this meant that the availability of large-scale, 'new housing was Porirua's main attraction and the reason for most of the population going there'.

== Choosing the location ==
In addition to the desire to make a satellite town, there were other important aspects of choosing the location that made it attractive for large-scale planning. This included the low land prices, which were substantially cheaper than the Hutt Valley at the time. It also already had a railway line passing through the area on its way from Wellington to Manawatu that was developed from 1880 to 1895. The railway line involved a 5.5 km of railway tunnels through a mountain range and was only made possible by the rather ‘entrepreneurial nature’ of the State railway department. Dvaitzki and Powell suggest that the New Zealand railway department had a major role in the suburban greenfields development and despite Porirua being primarily ‘developed with the era when one car per household was the norm’, its Government planners laid it out so as to "avoid" the emerging problems of car congestion becoming evident elsewhere’. Furthermore, new earthmoving and engineering techniques made Porirua development possible, in particular with the growth of Porirua East in the 1950s and 1960s was almost without parallel in New Zealand on a steep hilly landscape.

== State housing ==
In the 1950s and 1960s State Housing designs changed due to cost, to material shortages and to concerns about 'urban sprawl' in Porirua and in wider New Zealand. Housing became increasingly standardised and cheaper material like fibrolite cladding came into use. This was generally unpopular, with growing negative public perceptions of State housing. It was markedly different from the approach adopted by Michael Joseph Savage in 1939, where 400 different designs by architects meant no two homes were exactly alike and where low-density, single-unit dwellings characterised State housing in Porirua. In part this change to a more standardised approach came in response to the material shortages in the 1950s, which meant importing 500 pre-cut houses for the southern part of Tītahi Bay. A total of 194 tradesmen came from Austria on 18-month contracts to complete these houses.

Another development in the 1950s and 1960s involved a change to multi-units. Boyd argues that these became the defining feature of Porirua, and they met with opposition and unpopularity. The Anglican Church's 1963 report on Porirua East, which was dominated by duplex housing, accused the government of "forgetting the social needs of the community when planning the area". Images of Porirua East appeared in 1970s publicity-material as an example of what to avoid in future housing schemes - because of its bland uniformity and multiplex nature. In 1977 State housing comprised 64% single-family dwellings, 20% double semi-detached units, and 15% multiple units(4 to 8 people housed). This contrasted to 99% of private dwellings being single dwellings. Mullins and Robbs study in 1977 showed that residents as a whole responded in a "largely positive manner to the physical environment of dwelling and resident area and to the social character of the community". He saw this as due to the mainly "single-family housing which contributed significantly to the residential satisfaction of Porirua public housing resident". In contrast, "those living in housing densities greater than single family dwelling expressed more dissatisfaction with their dwelling and with the residential locality".
