= Elsdon, New Zealand =

Suburb of Porirua

Coordinates: 41°08′S 174°50′E

Elsdon
- Suburb
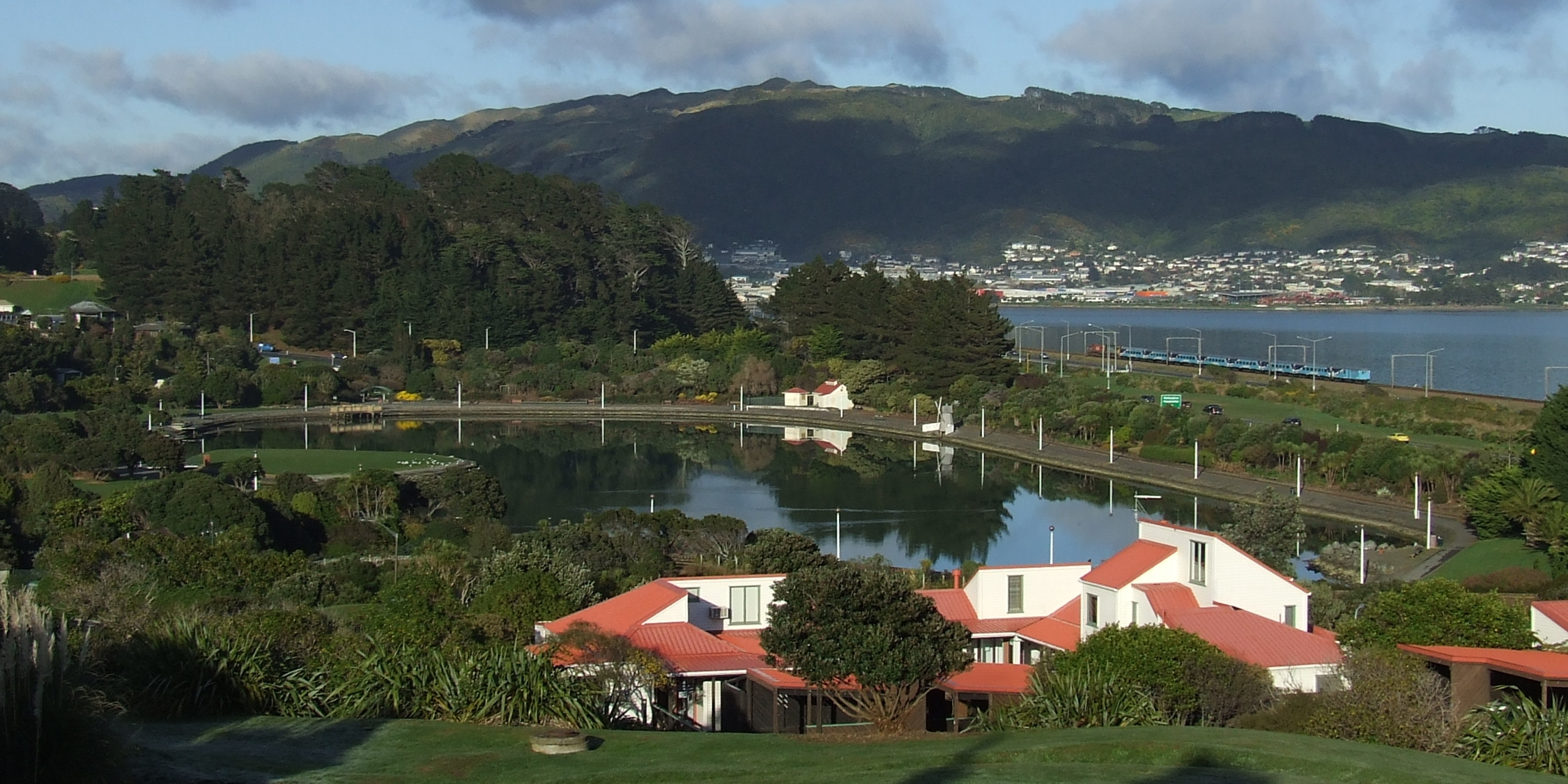
- Elsdon and the surrounding area, seen in the back right, viewed from Aotea Lagoon.
- Interactive map of Elsdon
- Country: New Zealand
- Region: Wellington
- City: Porirua City
- Local authority: Porirua City Council
- Electoral ward: Onepoto General Ward; Porirua Māori Ward

Area
  - Land: 113 ha (280 acres)

Population (2023 census)
  - Total: 903
  - Density: 799/km^{2} (2,070/sq mi)

	Takapūwāhia
Colonial Knob	Elsdon	Porirua CBD
	Kenepuru

Elsdon is a suburb of the New Zealand city of Porirua located immediately to the west to of the city's CBD. The area was named after Elsdon Best, a historian who studied archaeological sites in the area. Its industrial area, the largest in the city, is known for housing the factory used by New Zealand chocolate company Whittaker's; constructed in 1969, it remains the company's sole production site to this day.

== Demographics ==
Elsdon covers 1.13 km^{2} (0.44 sq mi). Most of Elsdon is part of the Porirua Central area, but the majority of its population is in the Elsdon-Takapuwahia statistical area.

Historical population
Year	Pop.	±% p.a.
2006	861	—
2013	849	−0.20%
2018	954	+2.36%
2023	903	−1.09%

Elsdon had a population of 903 in the 2023 New Zealand census, a decrease of 51 people (−5.3%) since the 2018 census, and an increase of 54 people (6.4%) since the 2013 census. There were 438 males, 456 females, and 6 people of other genders in 276 dwellings. 2.7% of people identified as LGBTIQ+. There were 183 people (20.3%) aged under 15 years, 222 (24.6%) aged 15 to 29, 390 (43.2%) aged 30 to 64, and 114 (12.6%) aged 65 or older.

People could identify as more than one ethnicity. The results were 48.5% European (Pākehā); 34.6% Māori; 26.2% Pasifika; 16.6% Asian; 3.7% Middle Eastern, Latin American and African New Zealanders (MELAA); and 2.7% other, which includes people giving their ethnicity as "New Zealander". English was spoken by 94.0%, Māori by 10.0%, Samoan by 7.6%, and other languages by 14.0%. No language could be spoken by 2.3% (e.g. too young to talk). New Zealand Sign Language was known by 1.0%. The percentage of people born overseas was 23.6, compared with 28.8% nationally.

Religious affiliations were 33.9% Christian, 1.3% Hindu, 2.7% Islam, 3.3% Māori religious beliefs, 1.3% Buddhist, 0.3% New Age, and 1.0% other religions. People who answered that they had no religion were 45.2%, and 8.6% of people did not answer the census question.

Of those at least 15 years old, 150 (20.8%) people had a bachelor's or higher degree, 360 (50.0%) had a post-high school certificate or diploma, and 204 (28.3%) people exclusively held high school qualifications. 39 people (5.4%) earned over $100,000 compared to 12.1% nationally. The employment status of those at least 15 was 363 (50.4%) full-time, 96 (13.3%) part-time, and 36 (5.0%) unemployed.

== Education ==
Porirua School, a co-educational state primary school for Years 1 to 6, is located in Elsdon. The roll was 149 as of October 2025. It started in 1863 in Paremata and moved to its current site in 1958.

High school students living in Elsdon are zoned for the state secondary school Mana College in Takapūwāhia.
