= Kenepuru =

Primarily industrial suburb located in southern Porirua

- Suburb
- Interactive map of Kenepuru
- Coordinates: 41°08′50″S 174°49′50″E
- Country: New Zealand
- City: Porirua City
- Local authority: Porirua City Council
- Electoral ward: Onepoto General Ward; Porirua Māori Ward

Area
  - Land: 4.98 ha (12.3 acres)

Population (2023 census)
  - Total: 678
- Train stations: Kenepuru railway station
- Hospitals: Kenepuru Hospital

Porirua CBD
Kenepuru	Rānui
Linden

Kenepuru is a primarily industrial suburb of the city of Porirua in New Zealand. It lies immediately southwest of the Porirua city centre.

Kenepuru Community Hospital, the main hospital complex for Porirua, is located here.

== Demographics ==
Kenepuru covers 4.98 km^{2} (1.92 sq mi). It is part of Porirua Central statistical area.

Historical population
Year	Pop.	±% p.a.
2006	285	—
2013	330	+2.12%
2018	168	−12.63%
2023	678	+32.19%

Kenepuru had a population of 678 in the 2023 New Zealand census, an increase of 510 people (303.6%) since the 2018 census, and an increase of 348 people (105.5%) since the 2013 census. There were 357 males and 321 females in 234 dwellings. 4.0% of people identified as LGBTIQ+. There were 72 people (10.6%) aged under 15 years, 120 (17.7%) aged 15 to 29, 246 (36.3%) aged 30 to 64, and 237 (35.0%) aged 65 or older.

People could identify as more than one ethnicity. The results were 61.9% European (Pākehā); 15.0% Māori; 8.8% Pasifika; 23.9% Asian; 2.2% Middle Eastern, Latin American and African New Zealanders (MELAA); and 0.9% other, which includes people giving their ethnicity as "New Zealander". English was spoken by 96.5%, Māori by 4.4%, Samoan by 2.7%, and other languages by 23.0%. No language could be spoken by 1.8% (e.g. too young to talk). New Zealand Sign Language was known by 0.4%. The percentage of people born overseas was 37.6, compared with 28.8% nationally.

Religious affiliations were 48.2% Christian, 7.5% Hindu, 2.2% Islam, 0.4% Māori religious beliefs, 2.2% Buddhist, and 1.8% other religions. People who answered that they had no religion were 34.1%, and 7.1% of people did not answer the census question.

Of those at least 15 years old, 180 (29.7%) people had a bachelor's or higher degree, 231 (38.1%) had a post-high school certificate or diploma, and 174 (28.7%) people exclusively held high school qualifications. 75 people (12.4%) earned over $100,000 compared to 12.1% nationally. The employment status of those at least 15 was 204 (33.7%) full-time, 54 (8.9%) part-time, and 6 (1.0%) unemployed.

== Education ==
Wellington Seventh-day Adventist School is a co-educational state-integrated Seventh-day Adventist primary school for Year 1 to 8 students, with a roll of 106 as of July 2026. It opened in 1984.

Bishop Viard College is a co-educational state-integrated Catholic secondary school for Year 7 to 13 students, with a roll of 398. It was founded in 1968.
