= Workers' Dwelling Act 1905 =

Act of Parliament in New Zealand

Workers' Dwellings Act 1905

New Zealand Parliament
- Enacted by: House of Representatives
- Royal assent: 30 October 1905

Legislative history
- Bill title: Workers' Dwellings Bill

Related legislation
- Workers' Dwellings Act 1919
- Status: Repealed

The Workers' Dwelling Act 1905 was an Act of Parliament in New Zealand, and formed the basis for the country's earliest state housing scheme.

== Background ==
The Act allowed the Government to purchase land under the Lands for Settlements Act 1900, develop it with housing, and sell it to workers. The Act sought to alleviate housing pressures experienced by slum-dwelling working class members, especially those in the largest urban centres such as Wellington. The Act also addressed smaller urban centres, such as Nelson, but to a lesser extent. The initial regime allowed a dwelling to be sold to the worker gradually, often via a weekly rent after an initial fixed deposit.

The Act's housing scheme utilised standardised designs of dwellings. These designs were selected by a competition. Of the 150 designs submitted, only 34 were selected to be used. These were then split into two sets: one for the North Island and the other for the South Island. The designs were split into these sets based on how well they were suited to each Island's climate.

Many of the dwellings - especially the initial developments - were placed outside of the urban centres. Dwellings were built in Petone far from the railway station and tram connections. This is cited as being a deterrent to many workers, who were employed in Wellington City; rent and commuting fares worked out to be as high as a third of the workers income.

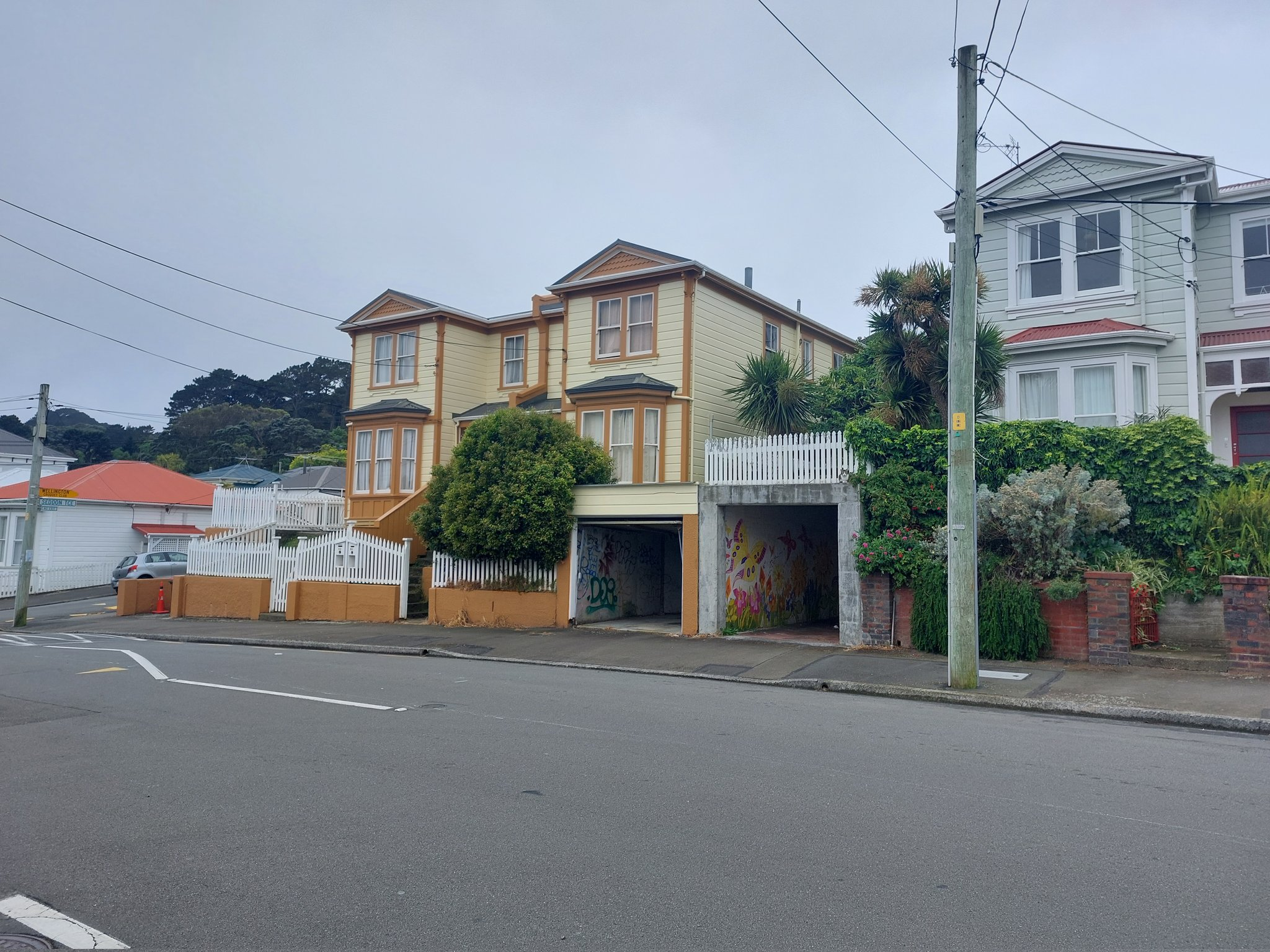
Houses built under the Act on Coromandel Street, Wellington

126 houses had been built under the Act by 1910. By 1919 this number had risen to 657. The law was repealed in that year by the Workers' Dwellings Act 1919.
