= Arthur Carman =

New Zealand journalist and pacifist (1902–1982)

Carman in 1950

Arthur Herbert Carman (2 August 1902 – 28 November 1982) was a New Zealand sports journalist and writer, bookseller, publisher, pacifist, local politician, and local historian.

== Life and career ==
Carman was born and died in Wellington, New Zealand. The oldest of five children, all boys, of Walter and Gertrude Carman, Arthur was born in Paparangi, Johnsonville. He attended local schools before gaining his Certificate of Proficiency in 1915, which gave him the final two years of his education at Wellington College in central Wellington, commuting by train each day.

He began work with the Government Audit Office in Wellington in 1919. He studied accountancy at night, and began contributing on cricket and rugby for the Wellington newspaper The Evening Post. In 1924, at the age of 21, he took leave without pay from the Audit Office to be the only New Zealand reporter accompanying the New Zealand rugby union tour of Britain. In 1926, while working for the Audit Office in Auckland, he led his first church service, at the Russell Methodist Church in the Bay of Islands.

In 1932 Carman moved to Ranui in Tawa with his new wife, Edith Clark; they lived at No 7 Iti Street, Linden. Arthur had worked in the Audit Department but, hankering for a bureaucracy-free life, decided to become a Lambton Quay bookseller. The couple liked the countryside, although Ranui had barely-formed metal roads and it was quicker for Edith to push the pram along the rail tracks to Tawa, picking up lumps of coal en route. Arthur caught the morning train to the shop. He started the agitation for a station at Linden to avoid having to pull the emergency cord to alight at Linden.

He was a bookseller and publisher (as Wright and Carman, founded by his father); his Lambton Quay bookshop served as a landmark and meeting place for thirty years. Arthur Carman Street in Paparangi is named after him.

Carman served on several local bodies: the Wellington Hospital Board, the Tawa Borough Council and the Hutt Valley Power and Gas Board. He stood unsuccessfully as an independent for the Wellington City Council in 1941 and 1944, and also for Wellington North in the 1943 general election – his only avenue to debate pacifism legally in wartime New Zealand.

He published sports books as Arthur Carman (The New Zealand Rugby Almanack, The New Zealand Cricket Almanack; both annuals which he co-founded) and local-history books as A. H. Carman or Arthur H. Carman. These included The Birth of a City: Wellington 1840–1843 and Tawa Flat and the Old Porirua Road, which went into three editions (1956, 1970, 1982).

Carman became a noted Christian pacifist, and spent some months in Mt Crawford prison in Wellington in 1941 for "subversion" when he attempted to publicly espouse the Christian pacifist view. His viewpoint had changed from traditional Methodism toward Quakerism following a 1925 visit to the World War I battlefields (he had been touring the United Kingdom as the sole press-correspondent travelling with the "Invincibles" All Black rugby team), although he remained a Methodist local preacher for the whole of his life.

Carman died in Wellington on 28 November 1982, survived by Edith, three sons and two daughters. A biography based on his papers was compiled by members of his family and published in 1994 under the title A Full Life: Three Score Years and Ten, One Man's Life. Bruce Murray and David Wood published a biography of Carman in 2011: Arthur Carman's Suitcase: The Life and Times of Arthur Herbert Carman. A selection of the Papers of Arthur Carman are held at the New Zealand Cricket Museum in four boxes of his notes, scrapbooks and correspondence.

== Works ==
- Rugby Almanack of New Zealand (1935–1982) with Arthur Swan
- W. N. Carson: Footballer and Cricketer (1947)
- The New Zealand Cricket Almanack (1948–1982) Tawa: Sporting Publications
- Tawa Flat and the Old Porirua Road (1956, 1970, 1982)
- The Golden Jubilee of the Ngaio School, 1908–1958 (1958)
- The Birth of a City: Wellington 1840–1843 (1970)
- New Zealand International Cricket 1894–1974 (1974) Tawa: Sporting Publications
- Wellington Cricket Centenary 1875–1975 (1975)
- Maori Rugby, 1884–1979 (1980)
- They Played for New Zealand: A Complete Record of New Zealand Rugby Representatives 1884–1981 and Their Matches (1981)
- A Full Life: Three Score Years and Ten, One Man's Life (1994)

Political offices
Preceded by Mervyn Castle	Chair of Wellington Hospital Board; 1960–1962	Succeeded by Berkeley Dallard
