= Linden railway station, Wellington =

Railway station in New Zealand

Linden
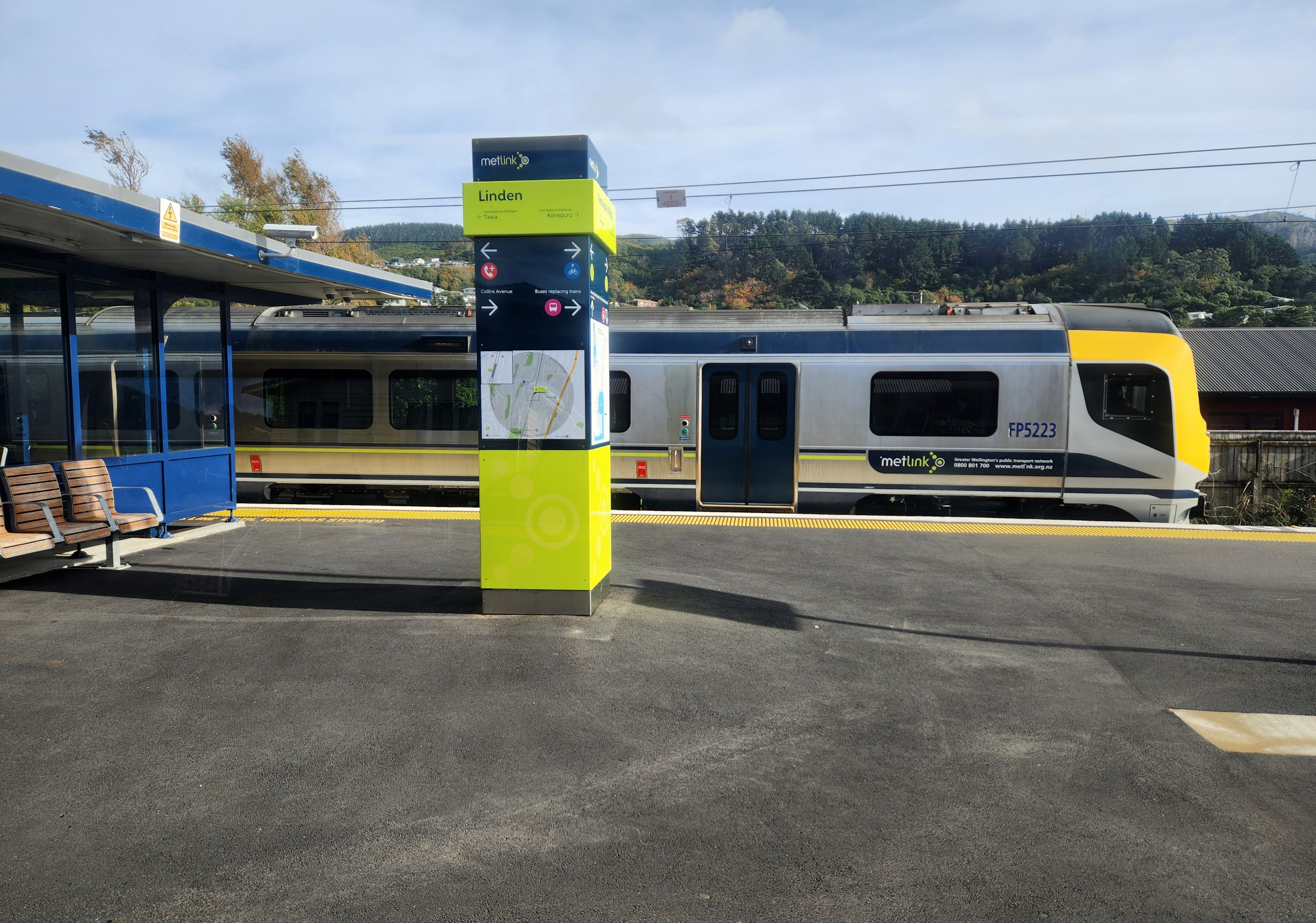
- Linden railway station in May 2026

General information
- Location: Rawson Street, Tawa, Wellington, New Zealand
- Coordinates: 41°09′31″S 174°49′54″E
- System: Metlink suburban rail
- Owner: Greater Wellington Regional Council
- Line: North Island Main Trunk
- Platforms: Island
- Tracks: Mainline (2)

History
- Opened: 28 July 1940
- Electrified: 24 July 1940

Services
Preceding station	Transdev Wellington	Following station
Kenepuru towards Waikanae	Kāpiti Line	Tawa towards Wellington
Location

Linden railway station is located on the North Island Main Trunk Railway (NIMT) in Linden, New Zealand, and is part of the suburban rail network of Wellington. It is double tracked, has an island platform layout, and is 14.9 kilometres (9.3 mi) from Wellington railway station, the southern terminus of the NIMT.

== Services ==
Linden is served by Kāpiti Line commuter trains operated by Transdev Wellington under the Metlink brand operating between Wellington and Porirua or Waikanae. Services are operated by electric multiple units of the FT/FP class (Matangi). Two diesel-hauled carriage trains, the Capital Connection and the Northern Explorer, pass through the station but do not stop.

Off-peak trains stop at all stations between Wellington and Waikanae. During peak periods, trains from Wellington that stop at all stations may terminate at Porirua or Plimmerton and return to Wellington while a number of peak services run express between Wellington and Porirua and thus do not stop at Linden.

Travel times by train are seventeen minutes to Wellington, four minutes to Porirua, and forty-three minutes to Waikanae.

Trains run every twenty minutes during daytime off-peak hours, more frequently during peak periods, and less frequently at night. Before July 2018, off-peak passenger train services between Wellington and Waikanae stopping at Linden ran every thirty minutes but were increased to one every twenty minutes from 15 July 2018.

== History ==
The line through Linden was originally part of the Wellington - Manawatu Line built by the Wellington and Manawatu Railway Company (WMR). The single track line opened on 24 September 1885 when services commenced on the first section of the line from Wellington to Paremata with the full line to Longburn completed in 1886. Trains were operated by the WMR until December 1908, when the New Zealand Railways Department purchased the WMR and incorporated its line into the NIMT.

On 19 June 1937, the Tawa Flat deviation to the south of Linden was opened to passenger services with double track from Tawa Flat to Wellington. It eliminated the circuitous single track route via Johnsonville to Wellington. The line through Linden was electrified in June 1940 and double track from Tawa Flat to Porirua was completed on 15 December 1957.

Linden station opened with trains stopping there from 28 July 1940, after more than thirty years of requests to the New Zealand Railways Department (NZR) by developers, and by local residents wishing to avoid a walk of up to a mile from the Tawa Station. Apparently, those wishing to alight used to pull the emergency brake cord so that the train stopped in the vicinity of Collins Avenue; Don Carman recalls passengers debating as to whose turn it was to pull the cord. Deputations and letters to the minister in the 1930s were told that the time (for a station) was not yet ripe; though a petition in April 1939 got agreement after completion of electrification (in 1940), though delayed by the war. Originally conditional on not asking for a shelter, the Railways department was approached by Arthur Carman to agree to residents erecting a shelter. The department relented and erected a simple 6-metre by 3-metre wooden shelter, opened on 30 April 1941.

In 1954, a diversion of the meandering Porirua stream north of Linden station cut off a loop of the stream and eliminated two old wooden road bridges by taking the stream under a new bridge built at the intersection of Collins Avenue, Linden Avenue, Beachamp street, and Findlay Street. This allowed the Linden shopping centre to be developed on Collins Avenue on both the east and west sides of the railway.

In conjunction with the double-tracking of the line from Tawa Flat to Porirua in 1957, an island platform was constructed at Linden and a new larger shelter built from precast concrete panels replaced the original shelter. The original straight track through Linden became the northbound line and a new southbound line was constructed that curves around the station. Pedestrian access between the north and southbound tracks was provided from Collins Avenue at the north end and a steel and concrete overbridge with ramps was constructed at the south end to provide access to Rawson and Hinau Streets. A feature of the overbridge was the high wooden sides to shelter pedestrians from the strong winds which are prevalent above Linden Station.

With the double tracking, barrier arms were installed for vehicular traffic on Collins Avenue and pedestrian cribs or zig-zags were provided. However, because northbound trains stopping at Linden prolong the operation of the flashing lights, bells, and barrier arms, and following trains, or trains approaching from the opposite direction, can also keep the warning alarms operating for long periods, many pedestrians became habitual risk-takers. The very short pedestrian cribs were poorly designed forcing some pedestrians to walk with their backs to approaching trains before stepping onto the railway line. A series of pedestrian deaths at Collins Avenue followed. This led to the installation of second train coming indicators and, in the late 1980s, redesigned pedestrian cribs. The new cribs eliminated the high death rate by ensuring pedestrians faced oncoming trains and took sufficient steps to look up and see the trains before stepping onto the track.

In the late 1970s, the original incandescent platform lights that automatically lit when stopping trains approached were replaced with more efficient permanently lit mercury vapour lights.

From April to June 2014, the corroded steel overhead footbridge was refurbished and new lighting and signage provided. However, the original high sides of the bridge were replaced with lower sides leaving pedestrians exposed to the strong winds and driving rain. In early January 2019, the pedestrian overbridge was closed when structural engineers found it was below the required seismic rating and was earthquake-prone. The bridge remained closed for over a year while options were considered and remedial action taken. With many commuters living south of the station and most of the parking at the south end of the station, commuters were required to walk some 400 metres extra distance from their cars to the single remaining station entrance at Collins Avenue and back to the station to catch a train. Tawa College students who commute from other stations were also required to walk the extra distance. The resulting extra pedestrian traffic, including the extra use of the Collins Avenue level crossing by students, increased the risk of another serious accident at this high-risk level crossing.

Initially, electric passenger services stopping at Linden were trains hauled by ED and EW class electric locomotives, and DM/D and EM/ET class electric multiple units. ED locomotives hauled passenger trains from their introduction in 1940 but were rarely seen on passenger trains after the introduction of the EW class locomotives in 1952. The last ED operated in 1981. EW class locomotives introduced in 1952 pulled the majority of passenger trains from 1952 but became redundant with the introduction of EM/ET class multiple units in the early 1980s. The last EW hauled passenger service through Linden was on 11 February 1983. DM/D electric multiple units first ran on the line on 5 September 1949, and the last of this class were withdrawn from service after the arrival of the FT/FP class (Matangi) multiple units in 2011. The EM/ET class multiple units were introduced between 1982 and 1983 to replace locomotive-hauled trains and some of the DM/D electric multiple units and last operated on 27 May 2016 after additional FT/FP class (Matangi) multiple units were introduced (instead of upgrading the EM/ET units).
