= Takapūwāhia =

Suburb of Porirua

Coordinates: 41°08′S 174°50′E

- Suburb
- Interactive map of Takapūwāhia
- Country: New Zealand
- City: Porirua
- Local authority: Porirua City Council
- Electoral ward: Onepoto General Ward; Porirua Māori Ward

Area
  - Land: 96 ha (240 acres)

Population (2023 census)
  - Total: 1,512
  - Density: 1,600/km^{2} (4,100/sq mi)
- Train stations: Porirua railway station

	Tītahi Bay
	Takapūwāhia	Porirua Harbour
Elsdon		Porirua

Takapūwāhia, also known as Porirua Pā, was originally built on one of the oldest settlements in the Porirua basin — Te Urukahika, a small hamlet located on the western shore of Porirua harbour in the lower North Island of New Zealand.

== History ==
In the 1850s, Takapūwāhia had a population of over 250 Māori. As the crown acquired more iwi land for Pākehā settlement, the wider iwi was invited to settle in Porirua by Ngāti Maunu, the senior hapū of Ngāti Toa. Families came from Pukerua Bay and Taupo Pā, now known as Plimmerton.

In 1889, the settlement moved from Te Urukahika (now called Elsdon, named after ethnologist Eldon Best) to its current location on the southern shores of the Onepoto Arm, and became the primary home to Ngāti Toa Rangatira. In 1910, a school was built next to the wharenui (meeting house).

At an unknown date sometime within the late 1800s, Ngāti Toa Rangatira Hoani Te Okoro was given land by his tribe at Takapūwāhia, where he then later became Episcopalian minister.

The settlement includes Takapūwāhia Marae, a marae (tribal meeting ground) of Ngāti Toa Rangatira. The marae includes a wharenui, known as Toa Rangātira, also known as Parehounuku. It was opened in 1982, replacing the prior wharenui that had stood since 1901.

On the 10th of October, Dame Whina Cooper and her large group of protestors were hosted at the marae by Ngāti Toa during the 1975 Māori Land March.

== Name ==
Takapūwāhia is named for a place of the same name in Kāwhia, the former home of Ngāti Toa.

== Demographics ==
Takapūwāhia covers 0.95 km^{2} (0.37 sq mi). It is part of the larger Elsdon-Takapuwahia statistical area.

Historical population for Takapūwāhia
Year	Pop.	±% p.a.
2013	1,440	—
2018	1,596	+2.08%
2023	1,512	−1.08%

Takapūwāhia had a population of 1,512 in the 2023 New Zealand census, a decrease of 84 people (−5.3%) since the 2018 census, and an increase of 72 people (5.0%) since the 2013 census. There were 753 males, 762 females, and 6 people of other genders in 477 dwellings. 3.6% of people identified as LGBTIQ+. There were 342 people (22.6%) aged under 15 years, 339 (22.4%) aged 15 to 29, 645 (42.7%) aged 30 to 64, and 201 (13.3%) aged 65 or older.

People could identify as more than one ethnicity. The results were 48.2% European (Pākehā); 58.5% Māori; 29.0% Pasifika; 8.5% Asian; 0.4% Middle Eastern, Latin American and African New Zealanders (MELAA); and 0.4% other, which includes people giving their ethnicity as "New Zealander". English was spoken by 95.0%, Māori by 16.5%, Samoan by 6.2%, and other languages by 7.3%. No language could be spoken by 3.0% (e.g. too young to talk). New Zealand Sign Language was known by 1.0%. The percentage of people born overseas was 15.5, compared with 28.8% nationally.

Religious affiliations were 42.7% Christian, 1.2% Hindu, 2.8% Māori religious beliefs, 0.8% Buddhist, 1.0% New Age, and 1.0% other religions. People who answered that they had no religion were 44.6%, and 7.3% of people did not answer the census question.

Of those at least 15 years old, 225 (19.2%) people had a bachelor's or higher degree, 648 (55.4%) had a post-high school certificate or diploma, and 312 (26.7%) people exclusively held high school qualifications. 99 people (8.5%) earned over $100,000 compared to 12.1% nationally. The employment status of those at least 15 was 624 (53.3%) full-time, 123 (10.5%) part-time, and 57 (4.9%) unemployed.

=== Elsdon-Takapuwahia statistical area ===
The Elsdon-Takapuwahia statistical area covers 10.29 km^{2} (3.97 sq mi) and also includes the large rural area of Rangituhi / Colonial Knob to the west. It had an estimated population of 2,430 as of June 2025, with a population density of 236.15 people per km^{2}.

Historical population for Elsdon-Takapuwahia
Year	Pop.	±% p.a.
2006	2,217	—
2013	2,157	−0.39%
2018	2,418	+2.31%
2023	2,337	−0.68%

Elsdon-Takapuwahia had a population of 2,337 in the 2023 New Zealand census, a decrease of 81 people (−3.3%) since the 2018 census, and an increase of 180 people (8.3%) since the 2013 census. There were 1,158 males, 1,173 females, and 6 people of other genders in 723 dwellings. 3.2% of people identified as LGBTIQ+. The median age was 33.2 years (compared with 38.1 years nationally). There were 513 people (22.0%) aged under 15 years, 525 (22.5%) aged 15 to 29, 1,020 (43.6%) aged 30 to 64, and 279 (11.9%) aged 65 or older.

People could identify as more than one ethnicity. The results were 47.2% European (Pākehā); 51.2% Māori; 29.8% Pasifika; 11.3% Asian; 1.4% Middle Eastern, Latin American and African New Zealanders (MELAA); and 1.3% other, which includes people giving their ethnicity as "New Zealander". English was spoken by 94.6%, Māori by 14.1%, Samoan by 6.7%, and other languages by 9.9%. No language could be spoken by 2.7% (e.g. too young to talk). New Zealand Sign Language was known by 0.9%. The percentage of people born overseas was 18.2, compared with 28.8% nationally.

Religious affiliations were 39.2% Christian, 1.4% Hindu, 0.9% Islam, 2.6% Māori religious beliefs, 0.9% Buddhist, 0.8% New Age, and 1.0% other religions. People who answered that they had no religion were 45.6%, and 8.2% of people did not answer the census question.

Of those at least 15 years old, 357 (19.6%) people had a bachelor's or higher degree, 975 (53.5%) had a post-high school certificate or diploma, and 495 (27.1%) people exclusively held high school qualifications. The median income was $39,500, compared with $41,500 nationally. 144 people (7.9%) earned over $100,000 compared to 12.1% nationally. The employment status of those at least 15 was 960 (52.6%) full-time, 198 (10.9%) part-time, and 99 (5.4%) unemployed.

The 2018 census revealed numerous trends in the area that differ from New Zealand as a whole. Ethnically, the statistical area was 52.9% Māori, 47.8% European/Pākehā, 28.7% Pasifika, 10% Asian, 0.7% MELAA, and 0.6% other. Meanwhile, New Zealand in its entirety is 70.2% European and only 16.5% Māori. Other differences include a larger Christian population (44.3% in the area compared to 36.5% nationally) and lower median income ($25,700 in the area compared to $31,800 nationally).

== Education ==
Mana College is a co-educational state secondary school for Year 9 to 13 students, with a roll of 491 as of October 2025. The school was founded in 1957.

Mahinawa Specialist School is a co-educational specialist school, with a roll of 145.
