= 12 Fife Lane =

Historic state house in New Zealand

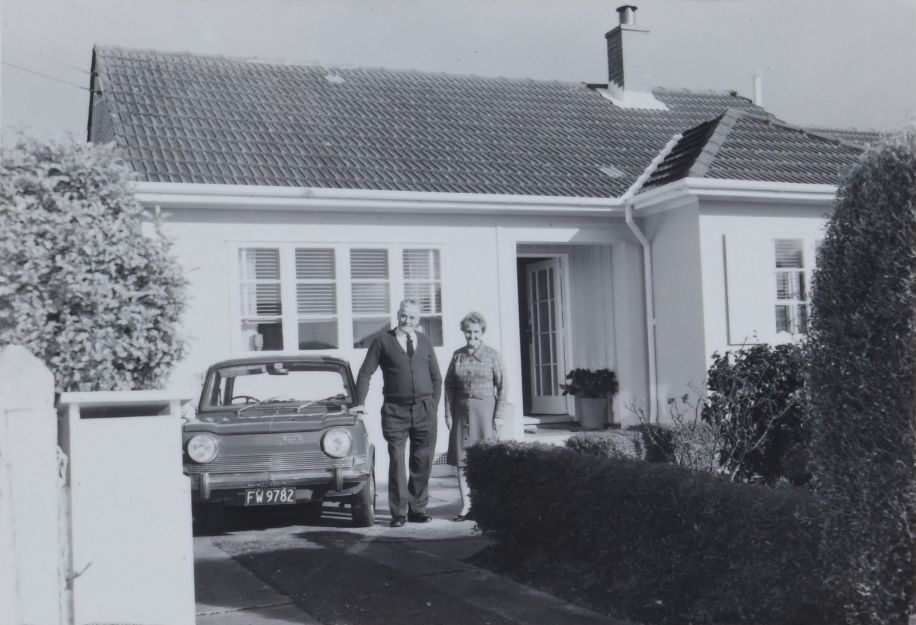
- The first state house with its original tenants
- Interactive map of the 12 Fife Lane area
- Alternative names: First State House

General information
- Type: House
- Location: 12 Fife Lane, Miramar, Wellington 6022, New Zealand
- Coordinates: 41.32437°S 174.81746°E
- Completed: 1937
- Opened: 18 September 1937; 88 years ago
- Owner: The Crown in the Right of New Zealand
- Landlord: Housing New Zealand Corporation

Heritage New Zealand – Category 1
- Official name: First State House
- Designated: 25 September 1986; 39 years ago
- Reference no.: 1360

12 Fife Lane, (also known as the first state house) Miramar, Wellington was the first state house under the First Labour Government of New Zealand. Completed in 1937, the three-bedroom, one-bathroom house was built with plastered brick walls and a concrete tile gable roof and sited on a 505 m^{2} (5,440 sq ft) section. The building is classified as a Category 1 Historic Place (places of "special or outstanding historical or cultural heritage significance or value") by Heritage New Zealand.

The house was opened on 18 September 1937 by Prime Minister Michael Joseph Savage and several cabinet ministers. The ministers carried furniture into the house, including Savage carrying a rather cumbersome dining table. Savage carrying the table became "the defining symbol of the first Labour government's state housing programme".

The ministers handed the keys to the first tenants, David and Mary McGregor. David McGregor was a tram driver for the Wellington City Council, earning a wage of £4 7s 9d (equal to $8.78 in modern New Zealand dollars) per week. Out of this total he paid the state £1 10s 3d in rent ($3.03), just over a third of his pay. The house was sold to the McGregors in the early 1950s after the successor First National Government allowed state tenants to buy their houses. After David and Mary died in the early 1980s, the house was sold back to the Government in 1983 and became a state house again.

To commemorate the 50th anniversary of the house and the state housing programme, Peter Neilson and Minister of Housing, Helen Clark, carried a coffee table through the same door that former Prime Minister Michael Joseph Savage had done 50 years before. The stunt was referred to as an act of "overt symbolism".

For the 60th anniversary of state housing in 1997, The New Zealand Herald visited the house, which at the time was occupied by John and Winnie Nysse and their three children. The market rents imposed on state housing by the Fourth National Government meant the family were paying 73.5% of their income ($215 out of $292) in rent, compared to the 34.5% paid by the McGregors in 1937.

On 25 September 1986, the house was registered with the New Zealand Historic Places Trust as a Category I heritage item, with registration number 1360. It was registered for its historical significance (as a symbol of Labour's housing programme), for its cultural significance, and for its architectural significance.
