= Linden, New Zealand =

Suburb of Wellington City, New Zealand

Linden
- Suburb
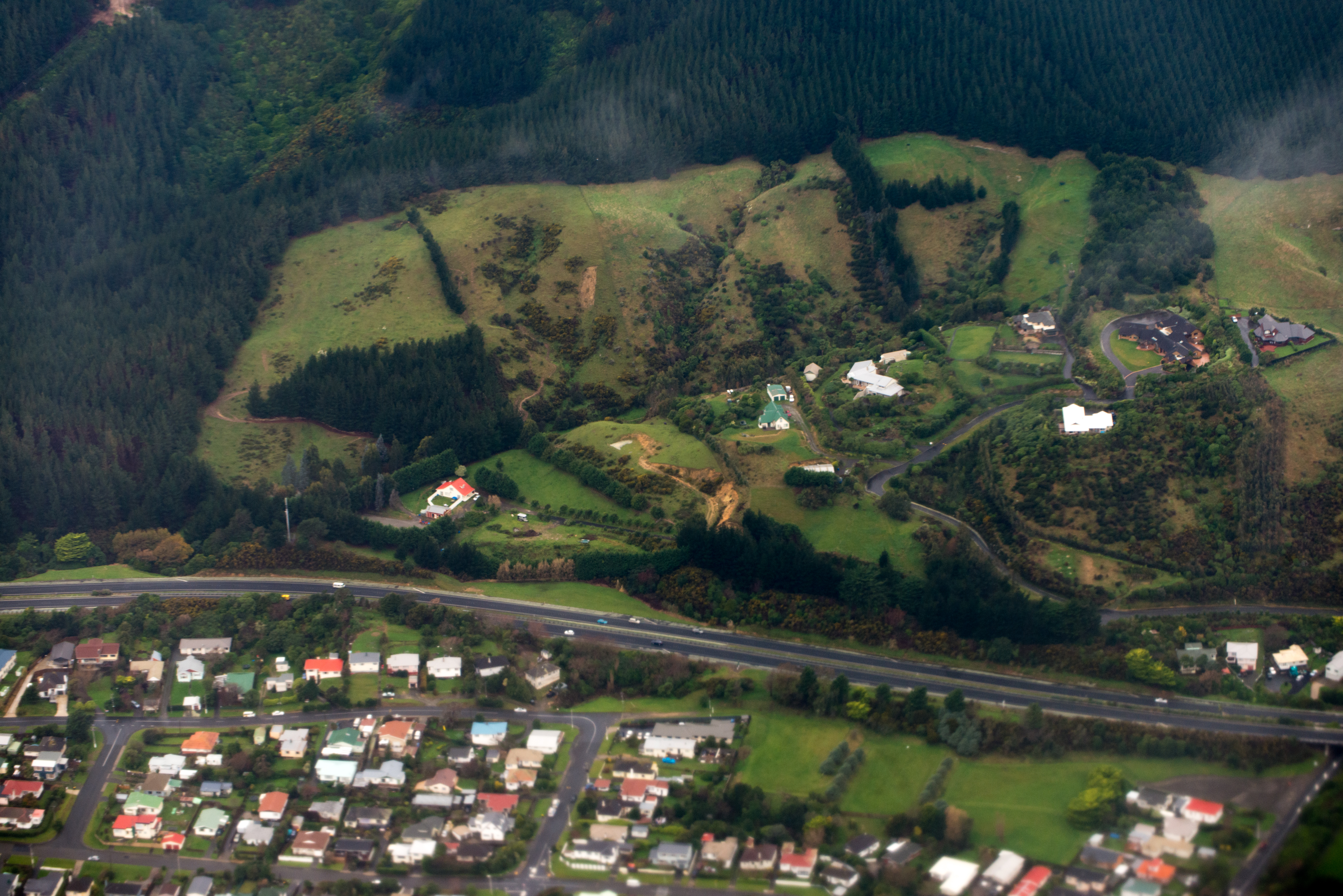
- Linden, looking east across the motorway. Arthur Carman Park is at the lower right.
- Interactive map of Linden
- Coordinates: 41.157°S 174.832°E
- Country: New Zealand
- City: Wellington
- Local authority: Wellington City Council
- Electoral ward: Takapū/Northern Ward; Te Whanganui-a-Tara Māori Ward
- Community board: Tawa Community Board

Area
  - Land: 112 ha (280 acres)

Population (June 2025)
  - Total: 3,540
  - Density: 3,160/km^{2} (8,190/sq mi)
- Train stations: Linden

Elsdon, Tasman Sea	Porirua	Cannons Creek, Rānui, Porirua
Tasman Sea	Linden	Takapu Valley
Churton Park, Glenside	Tawa	Grenada North

Linden is a subdivision of Tawa, the northernmost suburb of Wellington, New Zealand. Linden lies at the northern end of Tawa, just south of the city of Porirua.

== Demographics ==
Linden statistical area covers 1.12 km^{2} (0.43 sq mi). It had an estimated population of 3,540 as of June 2025, with a population density of 3,161 people per km^{2}. Linden is also included in the demographics for Tawa.

Historical population
Year	Pop.	±% p.a.
2006	2,814	—
2013	3,045	+1.13%
2018	3,258	+1.36%
2023	3,324	+0.40%

Linden had a population of 3,324 in the 2023 New Zealand census, an increase of 66 people (2.0%) since the 2018 census, and an increase of 279 people (9.2%) since the 2013 census. There were 1,635 males, 1,665 females, and 18 people of other genders in 1,194 dwellings. 4.2% of people identified as LGBTIQ+. The median age was 34.2 years (compared with 38.1 years nationally). There were 696 people (20.9%) aged under 15 years, 687 (20.7%) aged 15 to 29, 1,593 (47.9%) aged 30 to 64, and 345 (10.4%) aged 65 or older.

People could identify as more than one ethnicity. The results were 56.9% European (Pākehā); 17.8% Māori; 14.9% Pasifika; 23.3% Asian; 3.0% Middle Eastern, Latin American and African New Zealanders (MELAA); and 2.4% other, which includes people giving their ethnicity as "New Zealander". English was spoken by 93.8%, Māori by 4.9%, Samoan by 4.8%, and other languages by 21.4%. No language could be spoken by 2.9% (e.g. too young to talk). New Zealand Sign Language was known by 0.8%. The percentage of people born overseas was 33.2, compared with 28.8% nationally.

Religious affiliations were 38.0% Christian, 4.0% Hindu, 2.3% Islam, 1.2% Māori religious beliefs, 2.8% Buddhist, 0.2% New Age, 0.1% Jewish, and 1.4% other religions. People who answered that they had no religion were 43.7%, and 6.7% of people did not answer the census question.

Of those at least 15 years old, 786 (29.9%) people had a bachelor's or higher degree, 1,185 (45.1%) had a post-high school certificate or diploma, and 651 (24.8%) people exclusively held high school qualifications. The median income was $44,100, compared with $41,500 nationally. 378 people (14.4%) earned over $100,000 compared to 12.1% nationally. The employment status of those at least 15 was 1,413 (53.8%) full-time, 336 (12.8%) part-time, and 120 (4.6%) unemployed.

== Education ==
Linden School is a co-educational state primary school for Year 1 to 6 students, with a roll of 119 as of October 2025. It opened in 1952.

He Huarahi Tamariki is a teen parent unit. It opened in 1994.

== Transport ==
Linden railway station is on the North Island Main Trunk Railway (NIMT).
