= Star Flats =

New Zealand type of housing / architecture

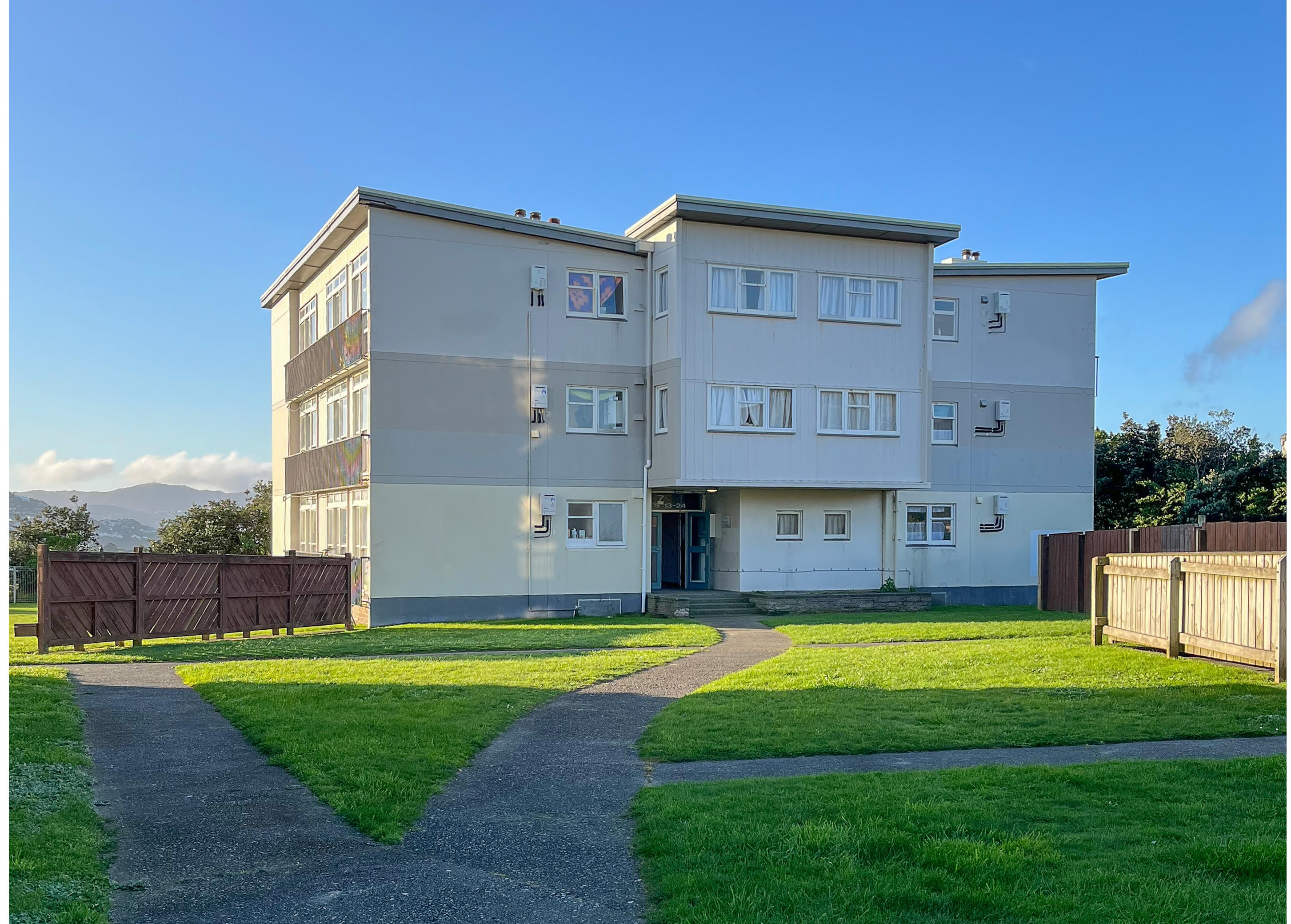
Star Flats at Ngatiapa Street, Strathmore, Wellington

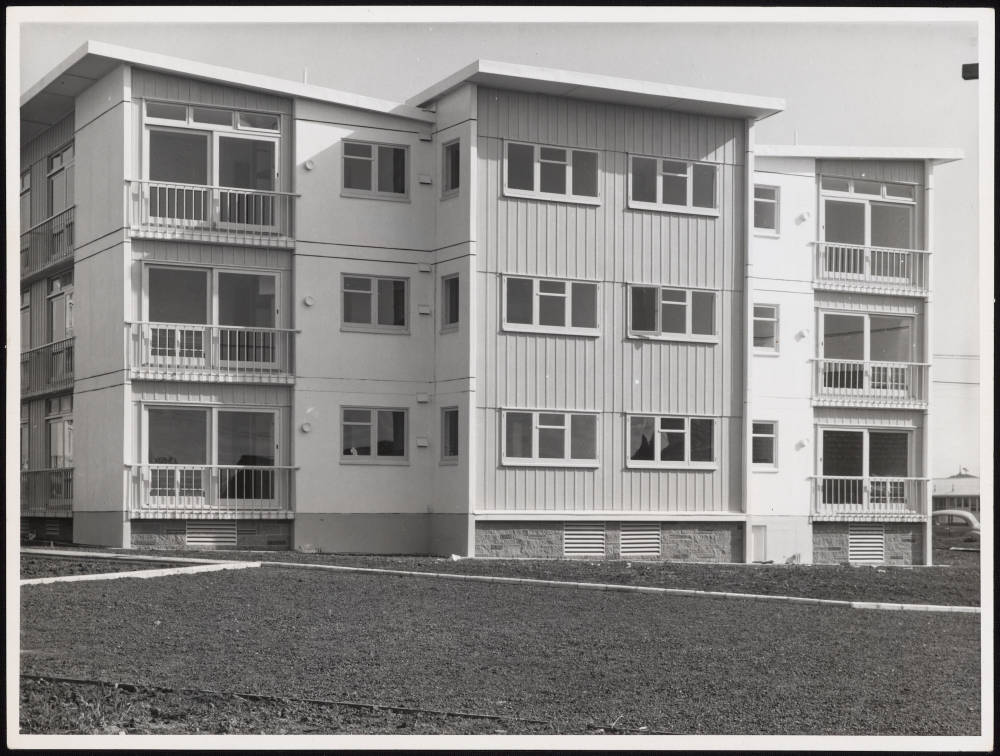
Star Flats in Ōrākei, Auckland (viewed from rear), built 1960.

Star Flats (so-called because of their butterfly roof and cross-like shape when seen from above) refers to a form of medium-density state housing in New Zealand. The flats were designed in the late 1950s by Ministry of Works architect Neville Burren, working under the Ministry's Housing Division's chief architect Frederick Newman (formerly Friedrich Neumann). They were built from 1958 and throughout the 1960s. Each building was named after a star.

== Background and implementation ==
In the 1950s, the Government became increasingly concerned with issues stemming from New Zealand's rapidly expanding cities, including the loss of good farm land and the growing pressures on urban infrastructure. Academics and architects noted that the current state housing scheme was partly to blame for this, as it generally promoted the creation of low-density suburban developments. Some higher density developments were being built by the Government, but these were usually semi-detached duplexes which were given an equivalent amount of curtilage as a fully detached house. In 1957, the Second Labour Government increased the ratio of new medium-density developments from one fifth of total new builds to one third. It later increased this to half and half.

Older medium-density designs were no-longer suitable for use by the late 1950s and early 1960s, and were therefore superseded by several of Newman’s designs. These included the Star Flats.

The first block of Star Flats was built in Maitland Street, Dunedin, in 1958. The design was then rolled out nationwide, mostly in the North Island.

The National Party was elected into Government in 1960 and continued to construct star flats.

== Design ==
Each three-storey block was constructed of reinforced concrete and consisted of 10 two-bedroom apartments and two one-bedroom apartments, each with its own laundry. Large sliding doors in the living area made it possible to open up the room so that it felt like a sunny balcony or outdoor space, with a balustrade protecting the occupants. The blocks were grouped together on often large sections with good sun and open space around them. This open space was intended to be a common area for the tenants.

== Legacy and use today ==
New Zealand Prime Minister Jacinda Ardern stated that she liked the Star Flats in Freeman's Bay, Auckland: "I like the building aesthetically, but I also like what it represents. These were built as social housing and for the first time we had apartments that were designed for whole families to live in".

Some blocks of Star Flats have been refurbished, for example Kāinga Ora's blocks at Maitland Street in Dunedin. Three blocks at Talbot Park in Auckland were renovated by the Housing Corporation in 2007 as part of a larger project. Decks were added to these blocks and the ground floor lobbies were opened up. Other blocks have left the state housing portfolio and been sold to private owners, for instance at Freeman's Bay in Auckland. Some are being demolished due to their aging physical condition, concerns about earthquake resistance and antisocial behaviour by tenants.

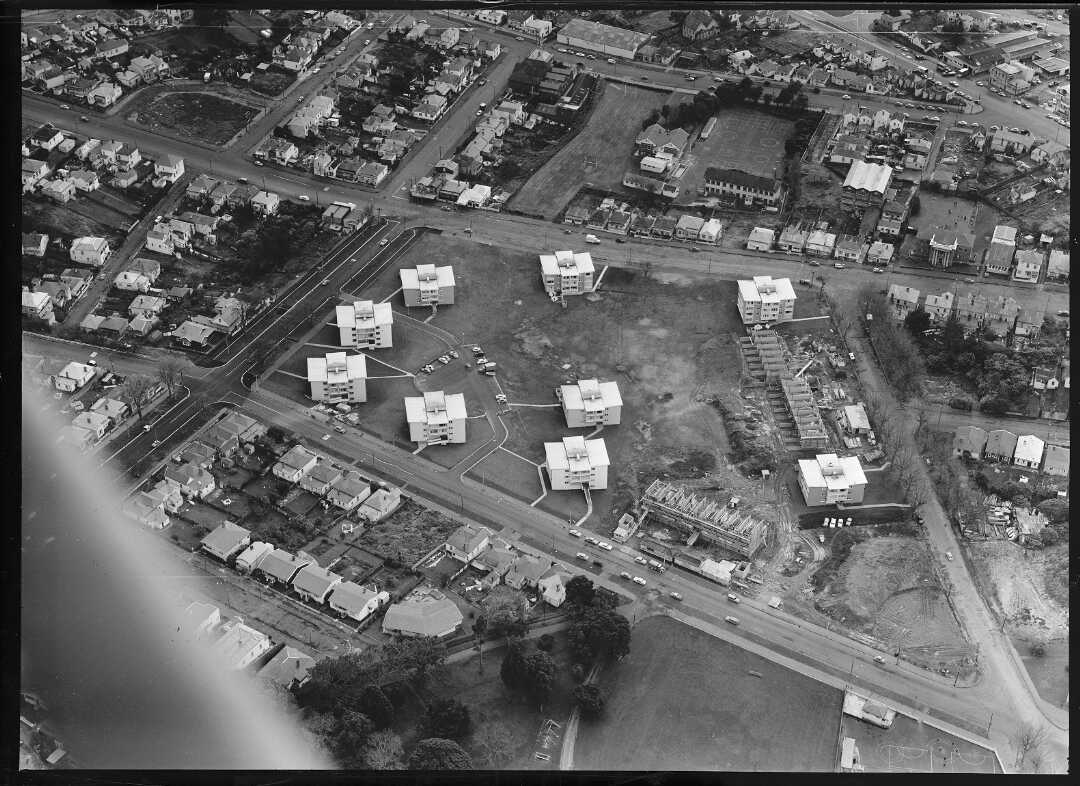
Aerial view of Star Flats at Freeman's Bay in Auckland, 1959.

== Examples ==
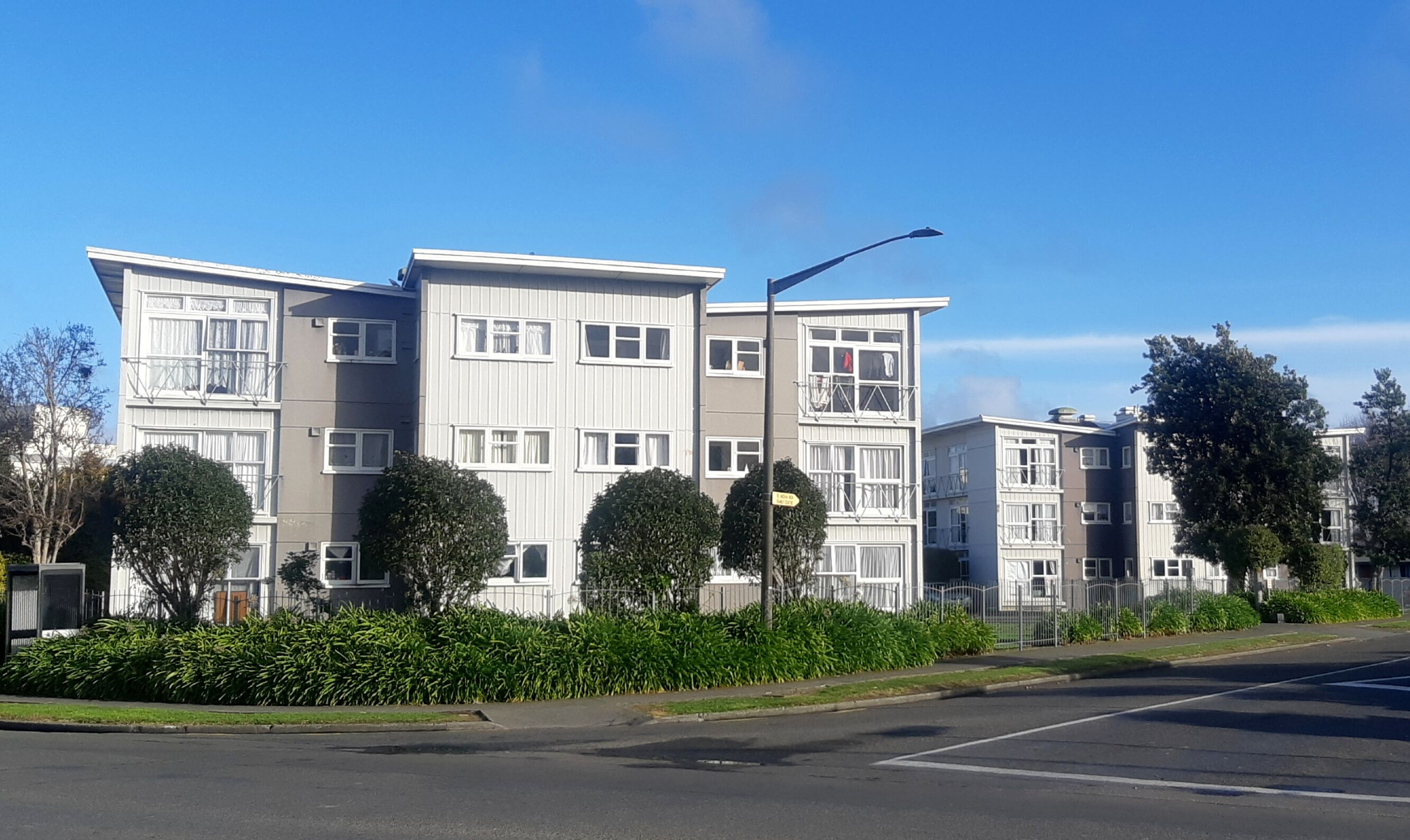
Two star flats buildings in Highbury, Palmerston North, 2020.

- Freeman's Bay, Auckland (nine blocks)
- Point England Road, Glen Innes (Talbot Park), Auckland (three blocks, renamed Kakariki, Kowhai and Karaka)
- Blockhouse Bay Road, Avondale, Auckland (three blocks)
- cnr of Kepa Road and Coates Avenue, Ōrākei, Auckland (four blocks)
- Cadness Street/Tonar St, Northcote, Auckland (three blocks, demolished 2020)
- Felix Street, Onehunga, Auckland (two blocks)
- 18 Frances Street, Hamilton. One block, which has a 'category B' heritage listing under the Hamilton City District Plan.
- Carnell Street, Napier (three blocks)
- Karamu Rd, Hastings (known as Karamu Towers, demolished in 2023)
- Highbury Park, Palmerston North
- Bonnie Glen Close, Upper Hutt (two blocks)
- Farmer Crescent, Taitā (three blocks, one named Mizar)
- cnr Taine and Churton Streets, Taitā (one block)
- Oxford Terrace and Colson Street, Avalon, Lower Hutt (named Deneb and Regulus)
- Naenae Road, Naenae (one block, named Alkaid)
- Waiwhetu Rd, Waiwhetu, Lower Hutt (three blocks, named Capella, Electra, and Arcturus)
- East Street, Petone (two blocks, named Antares and Altair)
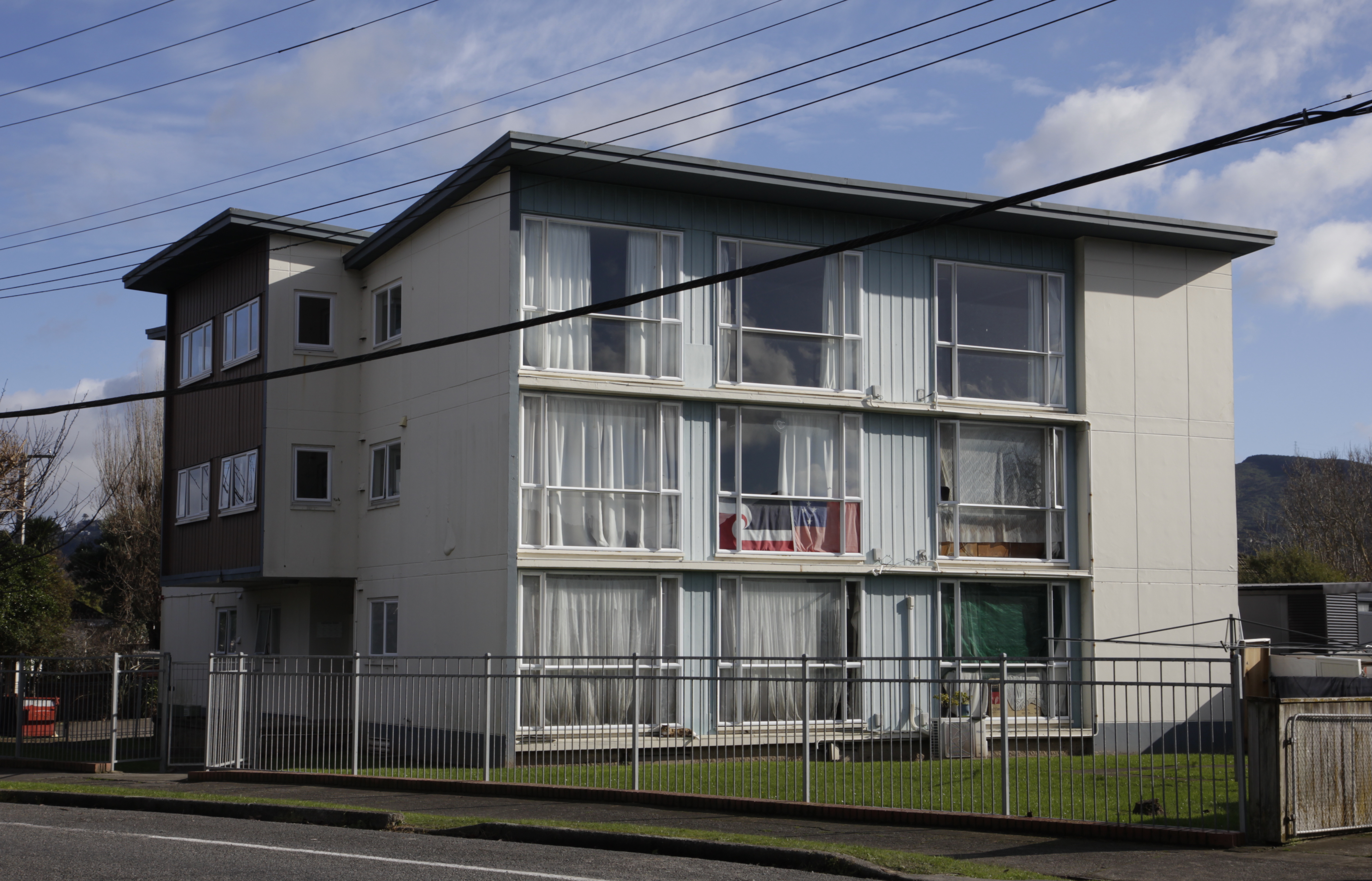
  Alkaid Flats, Naenae
- Jackson Street, Petone (three blocks, one named Menkar)
- Croft Grove, Moera, Lower Hutt (three blocks, named Riverside Apartments)
- Ngatiapa Street, Strathmore, Wellington (two blocks)
- Nuku Street, Strathmore, Wellington (three blocks)
- Maitland Street, Dunedin (two blocks)
