= Rānui, Porirua =

Suburb of Porirua

Rānui
- Suburb
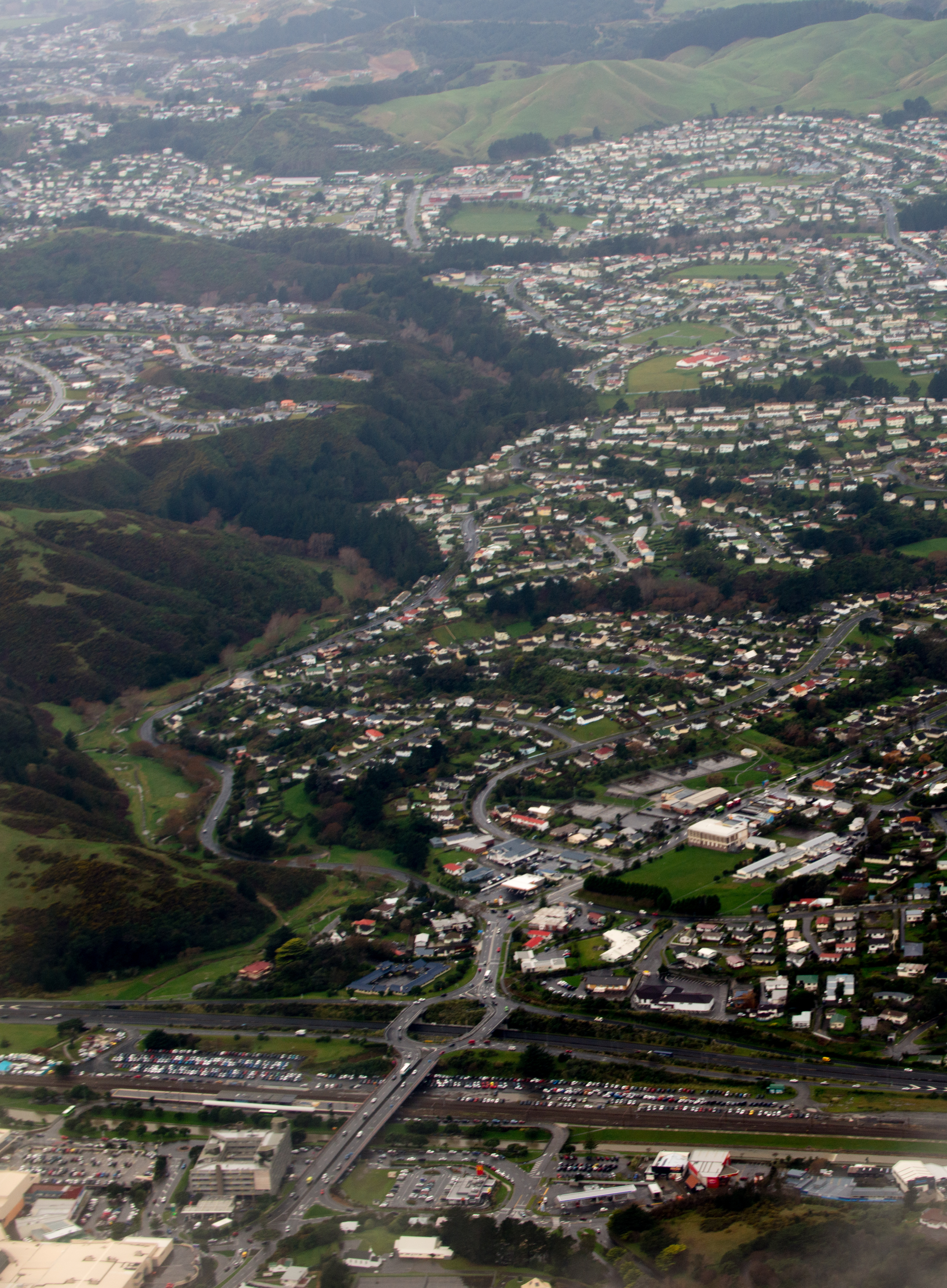
- Porirua East and Rānui Heights, with Cannons Creek and Waitangirua in the distance
- Interactive map of Rānui
- Coordinates: 41.143°S 174.848°E
- Country: New Zealand
- City: Porirua City
- Local authority: Porirua City Council
- Electoral ward: Onepoto General Ward; Porirua Māori Ward

Area
  - Land: 356 ha (880 acres)

Population (June 2025)
  - Total: 3,700
  - Density: 1,000/km^{2} (2,700/sq mi)

	Aotea
Porirua Central	Rānui	Cannons Creek
Linden		Takapu Valley

Rānui is a suburb of Porirua City approximately 21 kilometres (13 mi) north of Wellington in New Zealand. Rānui means midday in the Māori language.

== Demography ==
Rānui, comprising the statistical areas of Porirua East and Rānui Heights, covers 3.56 km^{2} (1.37 sq mi). It had an estimated population of 3,700 as of June 2025, with a population density of 1,039 people per km^{2}.

Historical population
Year	Pop.	±% p.a.
2006	3,477	—
2013	3,444	−0.14%
2018	3,564	+0.69%
2023	3,597	+0.18%

Rānui had a population of 3,597 in the 2023 New Zealand census, an increase of 33 people (0.9%) since the 2018 census, and an increase of 153 people (4.4%) since the 2013 census. There were 1,794 males, 1,788 females, and 15 people of other genders in 1,185 dwellings. 3.3% of people identified as LGBTIQ+. The median age was 34.5 years (compared with 38.1 years nationally). There were 729 people (20.3%) aged under 15 years, 771 (21.4%) aged 15 to 29, 1,683 (46.8%) aged 30 to 64, and 411 (11.4%) aged 65 or older.

People could identify as more than one ethnicity. The results were 44.8% European (Pākehā); 30.1% Māori; 38.5% Pasifika; 13.9% Asian; 1.3% Middle Eastern, Latin American and African New Zealanders (MELAA); and 1.1% other, which includes people giving their ethnicity as "New Zealander". English was spoken by 94.2%, Māori by 7.5%, Samoan by 12.4%, and other languages by 14.1%. No language could be spoken by 2.8% (e.g. too young to talk). New Zealand Sign Language was known by 0.6%. The percentage of people born overseas was 26.0, compared with 28.8% nationally.

Religious affiliations were 43.7% Christian, 2.0% Hindu, 1.8% Islam, 1.3% Māori religious beliefs, 1.6% Buddhist, 0.6% New Age, 0.1% Jewish, and 1.5% other religions. People who answered that they had no religion were 39.6%, and 8.0% of people did not answer the census question.

Of those at least 15 years old, 510 (17.8%) people had a bachelor's or higher degree, 1,533 (53.5%) had a post-high school certificate or diploma, and 828 (28.9%) people exclusively held high school qualifications. The median income was $40,000, compared with $41,500 nationally. 204 people (7.1%) earned over $100,000 compared to 12.1% nationally. The employment status of those at least 15 was 1,542 (53.8%) full-time, 336 (11.7%) part-time, and 105 (3.7%) unemployed.

Individual statistical areas
Name	Area (km^{2})	Population	Density (per km^{2})	Dwellings	Median age	Median income
Porirua East	1.21	2,250	1,860	693	32.5 years	$36,600
Rānui Heights	2.35	1,350	574	495	38.7 years	$47,400
New Zealand					38.1 years	$41,500

== Education ==
Porirua East School is a co-educational state primary school for Year 1 to 6 students with a roll of 150 as of October 2025. The school opened in 1954.
