= Rangituhi / Colonial Knob =

New Zealand hill/mountain

- Colonial Knob
- Location within New Zealand Location within Wellington Region

Highest point
- Elevation: 468 m (1,535 ft)
- Coordinates: 41°09′13″S 174°48′14″E

Naming
- Native name: Rangituhi (Māori)
- English translation: sky glow

Geography
- Country: New Zealand
- Region: Wellington Region
- District: Porirua

Rangituhi / Colonial Knob (Māori: [ɾaŋitʉhi]) is a large hill or mountain southwest of Porirua city and west of the northern Wellington suburb of Tawa. The peak's summit stands at 468 m (1,535 ft). Kapiti Island and Mana Island can be seen from the peak, and on a clear day the inland Kaikōura Ranges to the south and Mount Taranaki to the north may also be seen.

Rangituhi / Colonial Knob was formed from part of a 30–40 million year old peneplain, that has since been raised by earthquakes and eroded.

The hill is the location of the Rangituhi / Colonial Knob Scenic Reserve administered by the Department of Conservation, and Te Rāhui o Rangituhi and Spicer Botanical Park both administered by Porirua City Council. These reserves include a significant amount of the remaining native forest in the Tawa-Porirua Basin.

The Rangituhi / Colonial Knob Walkway makes up part of the Te Araroa national walkway.

== Name ==
Early Māori named the peak Rangituhi, meaning 'sky glow', in reference to the apparent red glow of the hill during sunset.

== History ==
The Rangituhi / Colonial Knob Scenic Reserve contains two abandoned reservoirs which were built in the late 19th century in order to serve the Porirua Hospital. These reservoirs became redundant when the hospital was connected to the main Porirua City water supply.

== Proposed adventure park ==
Rangituhi / Colonial Knob is the proposed location for an adventure park to be called the 'Porirua Adventure Park', with plans going back to 2016. This includes proposals for mountain biking, zip lines, surf simulators, a gondola and cafes. The park was expected to open in late 2023, with the developer saying the project may be rolled out in phases due to increased construction and logistic costs. In mid 2023, the developer was seeking another $3m in funding before the project could proceed, and the revised opening date was Christmas 2024.
