= Cannons Creek, New Zealand =

Suburb of Porirua near Wellington, New Zealand

Cannons Creek
- Suburb
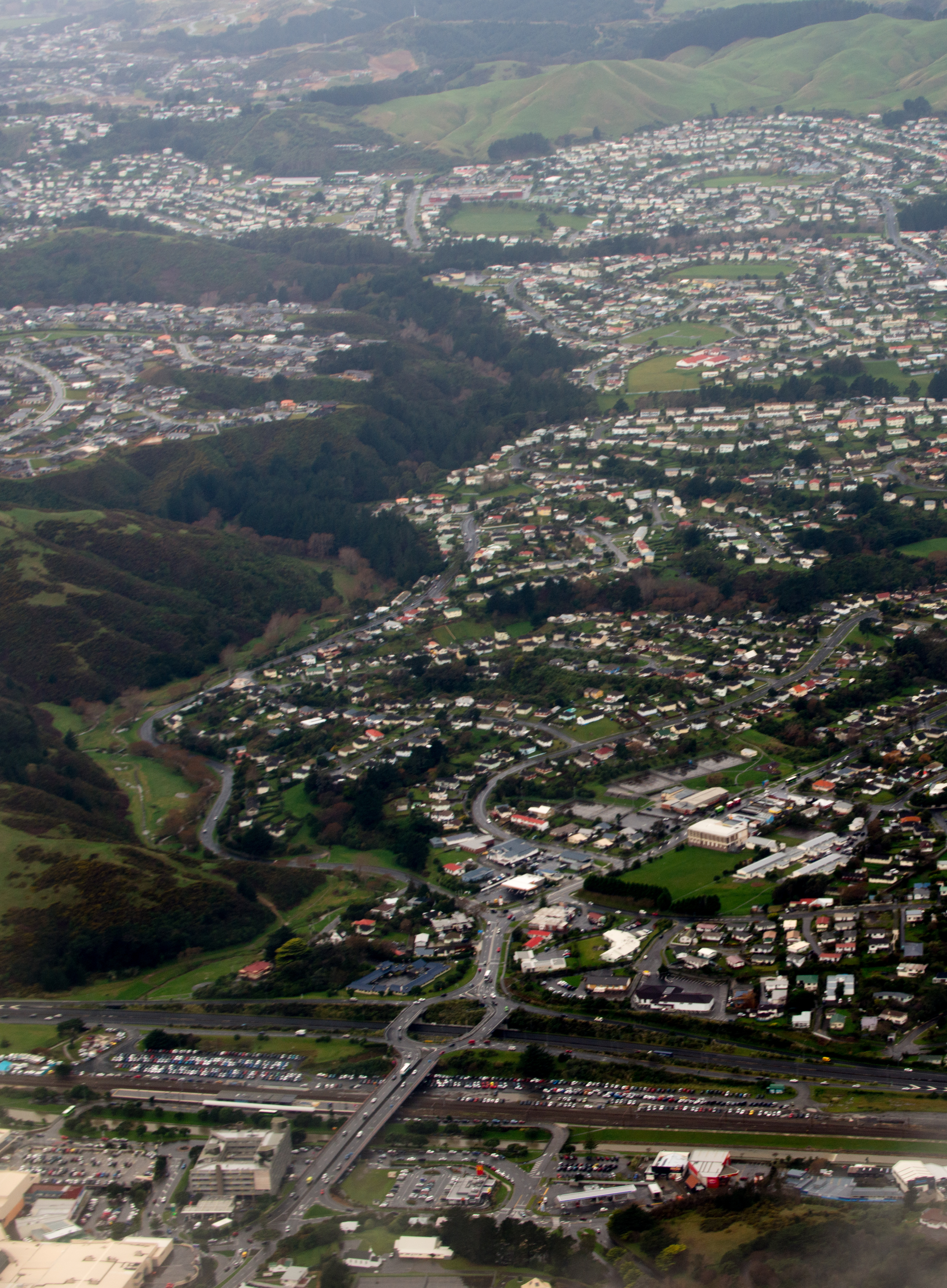
- Cannon's Creek is in the middle and upper part of the photo, with Waitangirua at the very top and Rānui at the bottom.
- Interactive map of Cannons Creek
- Coordinates: 41.141°S 174.866°E
- Country: New Zealand
- City: Porirua City
- Local authority: Porirua City Council
- Electoral ward: Onepoto General Ward; Porirua Māori Ward

Area
  - Land: 392 ha (970 acres)

Population (June 2025)
  - Total: 8,920
  - Density: 2,280/km^{2} (5,890/sq mi)

	Waitangirua
Rānui	Cannons Creek
	Takapu Valley	Belmont Regional Park

Cannons Creek is a suburb of Porirua City approximately 22km north of Wellington in New Zealand.

== Etymology ==
The name Cannons Creek comes from a creek that flows off of Cannons Head. It is named after William Cannon, an early settler of the area.

== History ==
Cannons Creek was originally farmland until it slowly started to be developed as housing from the 1930s with a significant growth in the 1950s.

Most the suburb's streets are named after ships, English counties, and from Greek mythology.

== Demographics ==
Cannons Creek, comprising the statistical areas of Cannons Creek North, Cannons Creek East and Cannons Creek South, covers 3.92 km^{2} (1.51 sq mi). It had an estimated population of 8,920 as of June 2025, with a population density of 2,276 people per km^{2}.

Historical population
Year	Pop.	±% p.a.
2006	8,604	—
2013	8,220	−0.65%
2018	8,973	+1.77%
2023	8,787	−0.42%

Cannons Creek had a population of 8,787 in the 2023 New Zealand census, a decrease of 186 people (−2.1%) since the 2018 census, and an increase of 567 people (6.9%) since the 2013 census. There were 4,335 males, 4,428 females, and 21 people of other genders in 2,259 dwellings. 2.3% of people identified as LGBTIQ+. The median age was 29.1 years (compared with 38.1 years nationally). There were 2,382 people (27.1%) aged under 15 years, 2,127 (24.2%) aged 15 to 29, 3,540 (40.3%) aged 30 to 64, and 741 (8.4%) aged 65 or older.

People could identify as more than one ethnicity. The results were 23.6% European (Pākehā); 27.4% Māori; 63.3% Pasifika; 10.2% Asian; 2.4% Middle Eastern, Latin American and African New Zealanders (MELAA); and 0.9% other, which includes people giving their ethnicity as "New Zealander". English was spoken by 90.7%, Māori by 6.4%, Samoan by 25.4%, and other languages by 15.1%. No language could be spoken by 2.9% (e.g. too young to talk). New Zealand Sign Language was known by 0.7%. The percentage of people born overseas was 30.1, compared with 28.8% nationally.

Religious affiliations were 55.2% Christian, 1.1% Hindu, 2.7% Islam, 1.6% Māori religious beliefs, 1.6% Buddhist, 0.1% New Age, and 0.6% other religions. People who answered that they had no religion were 29.7%, and 7.6% of people did not answer the census question.

Of those at least 15 years old, 570 (8.9%) people had a bachelor's or higher degree, 3,396 (53.0%) had a post-high school certificate or diploma, and 2,436 (38.0%) people exclusively held high school qualifications. The median income was $31,100, compared with $41,500 nationally. 177 people (2.8%) earned over $100,000 compared to 12.1% nationally. The employment status of those at least 15 was 2,952 (46.1%) full-time, 708 (11.1%) part-time, and 450 (7.0%) unemployed.

Individual statistical areas
Name	Area (km^{2})	Population	Density (per km^{2})	Dwellings	Median age	Median income
Cannons Creek North	1.06	3,456	3,260	927	28.6 years	$29,700
Cannons Creek East	1.46	3,639	2,492	900	29.9 years	$30,700
Cannons Creek South	1.41	1,692	1,200	432	28.9 years	$34,500
New Zealand					38.1 years	$41,500

== Education ==
All these schools are co-educational. Rolls are as of October 2025.

=== Primary schools ===
Cannons Creek has four state contributing primary schools for Year 1 to 6 students:

- Cannons Creek School, with a roll of 143
- Glenview School, with a roll of .
- Maraeroa School, with a roll of 152.
- Russell School, with a roll of 104.

Windley School is a state primary school for Year 1 to 8 students, with a roll of 204. It opened in 1958.

Holy Family School is a state-integrated Catholic primary school for Year 1 to 6 students, with a roll of 164. It opened in 1960 and became state-integrated in 1981.

=== Intermediate school ===
Brandon Intermediate is a state intermediate school for Year 7 to 8 students, with a roll of 181.

=== Secondary schools ===
Porirua College is a state secondary school for Year 9 to 13 students, with a roll of 586. It was founded in 1968.
