= 2011 ISAF Sailing World Championships – Finn =

Finn at the 2011 ISAF Sailing World Championships
- Venue: Perth, Western Australia
- Dates: 5–11 December
- Competitors: 72 from 33 nations

Medalists
gold medal	Giles Scott	Great Britain
silver medal	Pieter-Jan Postma	Netherlands
bronze medal	Edward Wright	Great Britain

The Finn class at the 2011 ISAF Sailing World Championships was held in Perth, Western Australia between 5 and 11 December 2011.

== Results ==
Results of individual races
Pos	Helmsman	Country	I	II	III	IV	V	VI	VII	VIII	IX	X	MR	Tot	Pts
Gold medal	Giles Scott	Great Britain	3	6	1	1	2	2	10^{†}	1	2	8	4	40	30
Silver medal	Pieter-Jan Postma	Netherlands	20^{†}	1	2	2	1	1	5	9	1	7	2	51	31
Bronze medal	Edward Wright	Great Britain	8	2	BFD 37^{†}	1	1	4	2	3	4	10	10	82	45
4	Jonas Høgh-Christensen	Denmark	4	7	4	7	4	12^{†}	4	12	3	3	6	66	54
5	Rafael Trujillo	Spain	1	3	BFD 37^{†}	2	4	19	6	5	8	1	16	102	65
6	Jonathan Lobert	France	13^{†}	4	1	3	2	5	9	13	11	4	18	83	70
7	Andrew Mills	Great Britain	4	7	5	OCS 37^{†}	6	7	8	4	21	5	14	118	81
8	Deniss Karpak	Estonia	6	5	4	4	3	10	17	19^{†}	13	14	8	103	84
9	Zach Railey	United States	2	5	BFD 37^{†}	7	6	14	14	6	12	2	20	125	88
10	Ivan Kljaković Gašpić	Croatia	3	6	BFD 37^{†}	5	7	15	13	11	5	16	12	130	93
11	Ben Ainslie	Great Britain	1	1	3^{†}	3	3	3	1	2	DGM 37	DGM 37	–	91	88
12	Tapio Nirkko	Finland	8	13	6	20	23^{†}	9	3	15	6	9	–	112	89
13	Vasilij Žbogar	Slovenia	11	8	2	8	5	13	15	33^{†}	19	12	–	126	93
14	Daniel Birgmark	Sweden	5	4	BFD 37^{†}	5	11	17	18	7	27	6	–	137	100
15	Thomas Le Breton	France	10	2	3	10	9	31^{†}	23	22	10	13	–	133	102
16	Chris Cook	Canada	2	14	7	15	9	18^{†}	12	17	16	17	–	127	109
17	Gašper Vinčec	Slovenia	22^{†}	18	8	6	5	11	20	14	9	21	–	134	112
18	Mark Andrews	Great Britain	9	8	7	9	14	6	27^{†}	16	20	24	–	140	113
19	Brendan Casey	Australia	16	3	9	4	8	16	19	21	OCS 37^{†}	25	–	158	121
20	Ioannis Mitakis	Greece	17	9	BFD 37^{†}	11	10	21	11	8	15	20	–	159	122
21	Dan Slater	New Zealand	5	11	BFD 37^{†}	9	12	23	7	20	18	18	–	160	123
22	Oleksiy Borysov	Ukraine	7	12	13	8	11	28	16	23	29^{†}	28	–	175	146
23	Björn Allansson	Sweden	11	10	14	15	7	35	DSQ 37^{†}	32	14	11	–	186	149
24	Filippo Baldassari	Italy	13	9	BFD 37^{†}	6	12	8	33	26	25	19	–	188	151
25	Giorgio Poggi	Italy	6	17	10	17	20	25	32^{†}	25	23	15	–	190	158
26	Caleb Paine	United States	9	19	16	31^{†}	17	30	26	10	7	26	–	191	160
27	Gregory Douglas	Canada	15	11	5	16	8	34^{†}	21	24	33	29	–	196	162
28	Matt Coutts	New Zealand	15	15	10	13	15	26	30	18	OCS 37^{†}	23	–	202	165
29	Anthony Nossiter	Australia	10	14	BFD 37^{†}	10	10	20	RDG 25	RDG 24.5	30	22	–	202.5	165.5
30	Oliver Tweddell	Australia	7	13	13	12	13	22	25	31	31	34^{†}	–	201	167
31	Johan Tillander	Sweden	23	10	15	13	18	29^{†}	24	29	17	27	–	205	176
32	Jorge Zarif	Brazil	16	15	12	11	25	24	22	27	32	33^{†}	–	217	184
33	Eduard Skornyakov	Russia	26	12	14	12	13	36^{†}	28	34	22	32	–	229	193
34	Jan Kurfeld	Germany	14	21	6	14	22	32	34	35^{†}	24	30	–	232	197
35	Gong Lei	China	17	18	17	26	14	27	29	28	26	35^{†}	–	237	202
36	Michal Maier	Czech Republic	18	22	18	16	16	33	35^{†}	30	28	31	–	247	212
37	Tomas Vika	Czech Republic	19	16	BFD 37^{†}	23	18	4	2	2	1	2	–	124	87
38	Timo Hagoort	Netherlands	23	20	11	OCS 37^{†}	21	2	9	6	8	11	–	148	111
39	Lauri Vainsalu	Estonia	22	26	11	22	30^{†}	5	7	4	5	9	–	141	111
40	Matthias Miller	Germany	27	16	BFD 37^{†}	25	21	7	6	7	3	4	–	153	116
41	Martin Robitaille	Canada	27^{†}	23	8	18	23	3	3	12	11	17	–	145	118
42	Brendan Wilton	Canada	25	23	BFD 37^{†}	DNF 37	30	1	1	3	2	1	–	160	123
43	Alexey Selivanov	Russia	14	27^{†}	15	26	26	13	11	1	9	15	–	157	130
44	Hein van Egmond	Netherlands	19	20	17	20	27^{†}	18	5	8	16	13	–	163	136
45	Ali Kemal Tüfekçi	Turkey	24	24	19	DNF 37^{†}	24	17	8	10	6	5	–	174	137
46	Nik Burfoot	New Zealand	26	25	DNF 37^{†}	18	22	12	4	16	17	6	–	183	146
47	Nachhatar Singh Johal	India	21	30^{†}	20	24	19	11	14	13	14	12	–	178	148
48	Florian Raudaschl	Austria	12	17	22	DNF 37^{†}	29	8	15	5	23	18	–	186	149
49	Tim Castles	Australia	20	25	23	14	27^{†}	9	13	15	10	22	–	178	151
50	Rafał Szukiel	Poland	18	21	BFD 37^{†}	24	16	14	OCS 37	9	7	7	–	190	153
51	Egor Terpigorev	Russia	12	19	12	DNF 37^{†}	DNS 37	15	25	14	12	8	–	191	154
52	Alican Kaynar	Turkey	30	24	18	21	17	6	OCS 37^{†}	21	13	10	–	197	160
53	Haris Papadopoulos	Cyprus	25	22	BFD 37^{†}	17	25	10	18	DNF 37	4	3	–	198	161
54	Gaszton Pal	Hungary	29^{†}	29	9	19	20	16	12	20	26	14	–	194	165
55	Anders Pedersen	Norway	29	29	16	DNF 37^{†}	19	20	10	11	20	16	–	207	170
56	Andreas Axelsson	Sweden	32^{†}	28	26	21	26	24	19	18	18	21	–	233	201
57	Brad Douglas	New Zealand	24	26	BFD 37^{†}	28	24	23	17	17	15	DNC 37	–	248	211
58	Marton Beliczay	Hungary	28	28	24	25	33^{†}	22	20	19	29	24	–	252	219
59	Christoph Christen	Switzerland	32^{†}	31	19	27	28	21	22	28	22	23	–	253	221
60	Miguel Fernandez	Spain	30	35^{†}	28	23	31	19	16	22	30	27	–	261	226
61	Silvan Hofer	Switzerland	36^{†}	32	25	22	28	26	23	27	24	19	–	262	226
62	Ross Hamilton	Ireland	28	33	27	27	34^{†}	25	24	24	21	26	–	269	235
63	Nanno Schuttrups	Netherlands	31	30	21	33^{†}	29	29	21	26	25	25	–	270	237
64	Robin Coutts	New Zealand	35^{†}	34	29	28	32	32	28	25	19	20	–	282	247
65	Shaun Wells	Australia	21	32	20	31	31	31	26	30	32	33^{†}	–	287	254
66	Akif Muslubas	Turkey	33^{†}	33	24	32	32	27	27	29	28	28	–	293	260
67	Rob McMillian	Australia	31	27	21	19	15	DNC 37^{†}	DNC 37	DNC 37	DNC 37	DNC 37	–	298	261
68	David Ken Leigh	South Africa	33	34^{†}	22	29	34	34	29	31	27	29	–	302	268
69	Richard Hirschker	Hungary	35^{†}	31	31	29	35	28	30	33	33	30	–	315	280
70	Benjamin Leibowitz	United States	RDG 36^{†}	36	30	30	36	35	31	23	31	31	–	319	283
71	Thomas Gautschi	Switzerland	34	35^{†}	23	34	35	30	32	32	34	32	–	321	286
72	Dimitar Vangelov	Bulgaria	34	RDG 36	25	30	33	33	DNF 37^{†}	DNC 37	DNC 37	DNC 37	–	339	302

Legend: – Qualified for medal race(s); BFD – Black flag disqualification; DGM – Disqualification for gross misconduct not excludable; DNC – Did not come to the starting area; DNF – Did not finish; DNS – Did not start; DSQ – Disqualified; OCS – On the course side of the starting line; RDG – Redress given; † – Discarded race not counted in the overall result;
