= 2014 ISAF Sailing World Championships – Finn =

Finn at the 2014 ISAF Sailing World Championships
- Venue: Santander, Spain
- Dates: 16–19 September
- Competitors: 78 from 31 nations

Medalists
gold medal	Giles Scott	Great Britain
silver medal	Ivan Kljaković Gašpić	Croatia
bronze medal	Edward Wright	Great Britain

The men's Finn class at the 2014 ISAF Sailing World Championships was held in Santander, Spain 16–19 September.

== Results ==
Results of individual races
Pos	Helmsman	Country	I	II	III	IV	V	VI	VII	VIII	MR	Tot	Pts
Gold medal	Giles Scott	Great Britain	1	1	1	1	1	2	3	4^{†}	8	22	18
Silver medal	Ivan Kljaković Gašpić	Croatia	5	3	6^{†}	6	4	1	5	6	2	38	32
Bronze medal	Edward Wright	Great Britain	9	DNF 40^{†}	1	1	19	5	1	8	6	90	50
4	Jonathan Lobert	France	3	25^{†}	2	4	2	7	6	19	18	86	61
5	Josh Junior	New Zealand	12	7	8	8	8	10	11	33^{†}	4	101	68
6	Andrew Murdoch	New Zealand	9	5	11	24^{†}	11	6	16	2	12	96	72
7	Caleb Paine	United States	18	6	15	3	6	12	19^{†}	5	10	94	75
8	Anders Pedersen	Norway	5	3	3	14	16	38^{†}	7	13	14	113	75
9	Thomas Le Breton	France	14	10	5	5	13	4	9	36^{†}	16	112	76
10	Max Salminen	Sweden	10	12	7	10	12	9	23^{†}	11	20	114	91
11	Jonas Høgh-Christensen	Denmark	2	7	9	17	20	17	2	37^{†}	–	111	74
12	Vasilij Žbogar	Slovenia	7	4	10	16	10	19	29^{†}	9	–	104	75
13	Jake Lilley	Australia	6	DNF 40^{†}	5	4	15	13	12	22	–	117	77
14	Milan Vujasinović	Croatia	6	2	8	8	28^{†}	25	14	16	–	107	79
15	Zsombor Berecz	Hungary	13	17	4	7	14	15	21^{†}	10	–	101	80
16	Tapio Nirkko	Finland	19	14	2	7	18	20	27^{†}	3	–	110	83
17	Ioannis Mitakis	Greece	11	15	24	6	5	3	28^{†}	24	–	116	88
18	Deniss Karpak	Estonia	2	13	12	3	17	8	39^{†}	34	–	128	89
19	Gregory Douglas	Canada	16	20	4	2	7	28^{†}	18	23	–	118	90
20	Michele Paoletti	Italy	DSQ 40^{†}	2	3	9	3	18	36	21	–	132	92
21	Björn Allansson	Sweden	8	13	6	20	27	35^{†}	13	7	–	129	94
22	Alican Kaynar	Turkey	13	18	10	15	9	14	15	30^{†}	–	124	94
23	Oliver Tweddell	Australia	1	9	7	22	31^{†}	31	4	25	–	130	99
24	Pablo Guitian Sarria	Spain	11	5	14	14	32^{†}	26	8	28	–	138	106
25	Alex Muscat	Spain	16	11	29^{†}	26	22	23	17	1	–	145	116
26	Pieter-Jan Postma	Netherlands	4	9	UFD 40^{†}	18	26	22	25	14	–	158	118
27	Frederico Melo	Portugal	4	1	17	24	30	32^{†}	22	20	–	150	118
28	Mads Bendix	Denmark	14	22	16	16	23	11	33^{†}	18	–	153	120
29	Josip Olujic	Croatia	3	19	13	12	25	21	32	35^{†}	–	160	125
30	Filippo Baldassari	Italy	8	15	15	5	29	29	37^{†}	26	–	164	127
31	Alejandro Foglia	Uruguay	17	8	12	12	35^{†}	34	30	15	–	163	128
32	Peter McCoy	Great Britain	19	19	13	15	21	16	26	27^{†}	–	156	129
33	Piotr Kula	Poland	10	23	25	10	38^{†}	30	20	12	–	168	130
34	Nenad Bugarin	Croatia	15	10	11	31	37	39^{†}	10	31	–	184	145
35	Gašper Vinčec	Slovenia	21	4	27	11	36	24	24	38^{†}	–	185	147
36	Egor Terpigorev	Russia	21	16	26	2	39^{†}	33	38	17	–	192	153
37	Michal Maier	Czech Republic	22	8	20	13	34^{†}	27	34	29	–	187	153
38	Jorge Zarif	Brazil	15	22	14	11	24	37	31	DNS 40^{†}	–	194	154
39	Phillip Kasueske	Germany	24	16	19	17	33	36^{†}	35	32	–	212	176
40	Giorgio Poggi	Italy	25^{†}	14	18	22	10	1	1	2	–	93	68
41	Martin Robitaille	Canada	32^{†}	24	22	9	2	9	2	1	–	101	69
42	Arkadiy Kistanov	Russia	22	21	21	27^{†}	5	4	6	4	–	110	83
43	Ben Cornish	Great Britain	24	20	33^{†}	13	1	7	7	14	–	119	86
44	Milosz Wojewski	Poland	17	21	18	28	15	2	UFD 40^{†}	5	–	146	106
45	Tomas Vika	Czech Republic	31^{†}	29	25	19	8	3	8	16	–	139	108
46	Anatoliy Korshikov	Russia	27^{†}	12	23	19	26	10	13	6	–	136	109
47	Gong Lei	China	20	27	22	25	6	6	UFD 40^{†}	11	–	157	117
48	Enrico Voltolini	Italy	12	26	16	25	25	DNF 40^{†}	12	3	–	159	119
49	Stig Steinfurth	Denmark	35^{†}	23	17	31	21	15	5	9	–	156	121
50	Eduard Skornyakov	Russia	29	18	32^{†}	28	17	20	3	7	–	154	122
51	Alexey Selivanov	Russia	33^{†}	17	24	20	11	11	30	18	–	164	131
52	Lauri Väinsalu	Estonia	25	25	9	32^{†}	9	5	27	32	–	164	132
53	Chen He	China	34^{†}	26	30	21	7	24	19	10	–	171	137
54	Simone Ferrarese	Italy	20	30	34^{†}	21	14	12	16	24	–	171	137
55	Andriy Gusenko	Ukraine	26	35^{†}	19	23	18	22	4	25	–	172	137
56	Michal Jodlowski	Poland	31	11	34	26	3	21	UFD 40^{†}	15	–	181	141
57	Jose Alejandro Aranzueque Tormo	Spain	27	28	23	34^{†}	12	14	15	23	–	176	142
58	Ondřej Teplý	Czech Republic	7	34	31	23	30	8	9	DNF 40^{†}	–	182	142
59	Fabian Pic	France	18	24	21	18	13	26	26	27^{†}	–	173	146
60	Eike Tjark Martens	Germany	37^{†}	32	20	29	20	17	23	8	–	186	149
61	James Hadden	Great Britain	28	27	27	33^{†}	27	13	14	17	–	186	153
62	Jesse Kylänpää	Finland	36^{†}	28	26	33	16	16	22	19	–	196	160
63	Mark Andrews	Great Britain	28	6	28	27	4	27	DNF 40^{†}	DNF 40	–	200	160
64	Ross Hamilton	Ireland	26	33^{†}	32	30	19	25	18	13	–	196	163
65	Dan Lovrović	Croatia	34	34	30	UFD 40^{†}	29	19	10	12	–	208	168
66	Alican Basegmez	Turkey	36^{†}	31	28	30	23	23	11	22	–	204	168
67	Fernando Ros	Spain	UFD 40^{†}	31	35	29	24	18	21	21	–	219	179
68	Tobias Kirschbaum	Netherlands	33^{†}	33	31	32	32	28	20	20	–	229	196
69	Mikolaj Lahn	Poland	32	30	33	37^{†}	22	32	17	30	–	233	196
70	Lars Haverland	Germany	23	35	37^{†}	36	28	30	24	28	–	241	204
71	Benjamin Montagut	France	30	29	29	35	34	DNF 40^{†}	28	26	–	251	211
72	Joseph McMillan	Australia	29	32	36^{†}	34	33	31	29	29	–	253	217
73	Valentin Nedyalkov	Bulgaria	38^{†}	37	35	35	31	29	25	31	–	261	223
74	Victor Gorostegui	Spain	23	36	DNF 40^{†}	DNF 40	DNF 40	DNF 40	DNF 40	DNF 40	–	299	259
75	Karim Esseghir	Tunisia	39	RET 40^{†}	DNF 40	DNF 40	DNF 40	DNF 40	31	33	–	303	263
76	Miguel Fernandez Vasco	Spain	30	DNF 40^{†}	DNF 40	DNF 40	DNF 40	DNF 40	DNF 40	DNF 40	–	310	270
77	John Dane	United States	35	DNF 40^{†}	DNF 40	DNC 40	DNF 40	DNF 40	DNF 40	DNF 40	–	315	275
78	James Hunter	United States	37	DNF 40^{†}	DNF 40	DNC 40	DNF 40	DNF 40	DNF 40	DNF 40	–	317	277

Scoring system: low-point system; Source:
Legend: – Qualified for medal race(s); DNC – Did not come to the starting area; DNF – Did not finish; DNS – Did not start; DSQ – Disqualified; RET – Retired; UFD – "U" flag disqualification; † – Discarded race not counted in the overall result;
