= 2012 Finn Gold Cup =

Event title
- Edition: 57th
- Host: Royal Cornwall Yacht Club

Event details
- Venue: Falmouth, United Kingdom
- Dates: 13–18 May
- Yachts: Finn
- Titles: 1

Competitors
- Competitors: 94
- Competing nations: 30

Results
- (gold) Gold: (United Kingdom) Ben Ainslie
- (silver) Silver: (United Kingdom) Edward Wright
- (bronze) Bronze: (Denmark) Jonas Høgh-Christensen

The 2012 Finn Gold Cup, and the official Finn World Championships, were held in Falmouth, United Kingdom, between 13 and 18 May 2012. The hosting yacht club was Royal Cornwall Yacht Club.

== Results ==
Results of individual races
Pos	Helmsman	Country	I	II	III	IV	V	VI	VII	VIII	IX	Tot	Pts
Gold medal	Ben Ainslie	Great Britain	1	3^{†}	1	3	1	1	1	1	1	13	10
Silver medal	Edward Wright	Great Britain	2	1	5	7	5	4	2	14^{†}	4	44	30
Bronze medal	Jonas Høgh-Christensen	Denmark	14	9	4	6	2	8	4	18^{†}	17	82	64
4	Ivan Kljaković Gašpić	Croatia	26^{†}	16	3	12	3	20	13	3	2	98	72
5	Tapio Nirkko	Finland	6	22^{†}	9	8	16	2	5	17	9	94	72
6	Piotr Kula	Poland	9	10	8	15	12	5	9	12	18^{†}	98	80
7	Mark Andrews	Great Britain	33^{†}	23	12	10	7	6	7	5	11	114	81
8	Andrew Mills	Great Britain	4	8	2	11	19	3	30^{†}	20	15	112	82
9	Pieter-Jan Postma	Netherlands	22	14	11	4	DSQ 95^{†}	14	6	6	8	180	85
10	Zach Railey	United States	15	15	10	32^{†}	8	13	18	11	3	125	93
11	Deniss Karpak	Estonia	5	5	20	26	4	7	OCS 95^{†}	15	13	190	95
12	Daniel Birgmark	Sweden	24^{†}	17	17	14	10	19	3	10	10	124	100
13	Brendan Casey	Australia	13	25	7	9	17	18	8	4	DNC 95^{†}	196	101
14	Greg Douglas	Canada	34^{†}	7	15	13	22	26	15	2	7	141	107
15	Jonathan Lobert	France	25	2	6	2	15	27^{†}	25	25	12	139	112
16	Dan Slater	New Zealand	12	24	13	27	9	32^{†}	10	7	14	148	116
17	Eduard Skornyakov	Russia	20	42^{†}	24	19	11	10	17	13	5	161	119
18	Rafael Trujillo	Spain	31	39^{†}	14	5	6	15	12	24	30	176	137
19	Rafał Szukiel	Poland	3	20	22	16	27	22	41^{†}	28	22	201	160
20	Matthias Miller	Germany	23	13	30	54^{†}	20	11	23	27	16	217	163
21	Oleksiy Borysov	Ukraine	30	4	26	18	18	29	32^{†}	21	19	197	165
22	Matt Coutts	New Zealand	45^{†}	35	36	22	32	25	11	9	6	221	176
23	Florian Raudaschl	Austria	29	11	21	35^{†}	33	28	16	16	28	217	182
24	Michael Maier	Czech Republic	10	37^{†}	31	30	21	24	19	30	27	229	192
25	Christopher Cook	Canada	8	12	16	1	13	12	40	DNS 95^{†}	DNC 95	292	197
26	Björn Allansson	Sweden	64^{†}	26	19	42	28	31	21	8	26	265	201
27	Caleb Paine	United States	37	27	27	20	DSQ 95^{†}	16	20	36	20	298	203
28	Timo Hagoort	Netherlands	35	21	28	25	31	40^{†}	14	22	35	251	211
29	Alican Kaynar	Turkey	32	30	25	64^{†}	40	9	26	32	29	287	223
30	Gong Lei	China	21	31	33	38	26	17	28	48^{†}	33	275	227
31	Tomas Vika	Czech Republic	17	19	39	44^{†}	25	35	34	38	21	272	228
32	Hein van Egmond	Netherlands	11	41	42^{†}	17	34	33	29	40	32	279	237
33	Andrii Gusenko	Ukraine	43	18	40	21	30	36	47^{†}	26	24	285	238
34	Jorge Zarif	Brazil	50	6	35	31	35	23	OCS 95^{†}	34	25	334	239
35	Josip Olujic	Croatia	36	55^{†}	34	23	39	21	36	19	36	299	244
36	Martin Robitaille	Canada	18	33	29	45	24	DSQ 95^{†}	31	23	44	342	247
37	Anders Pedersen	Norway	44	46	18	55^{†}	RDG 20	RDGa 34.3	24	33	34	308.3	253.3
38	Tudor Bilic	Croatia	48^{†}	47	38	36	14	37	27	35	RDGa 35.3	317.3	269.3
39	Alexey Selivanov	Russia	7	34	52	48	DSQ 95^{†}	30	22	53	39	380	285
40	Haris Papadoupoulos	Cyprus	47	44	48	33	50^{†}	38	39	37	23	359	309
41	Łukasz Lesiński	Poland	61	52	70^{†}	40	29	45	33	31	38	399	329
42	Egor Terpigorev	Russia	BFD 95^{†}	60	32	28	48	44	53	39	31	430	335
43	Nachhatar Johal	India	38	38	62^{†}	52	43	RDG 29	48	45	43	398	336
44	Gaszton Pál	Hungary	39	29	43	46	47	34	49	51	DNC 95^{†}	433	338
45	James Hadden	Great Britain	70^{†}	36	47	41	49	60	37	42	37	419	349
46	Peter McCoy	Great Britain	42	59	37	47	42	47	43	43	DNF 95^{†}	455	360
47	Andreas Axelsson	Sweden	41	63	60	37	41	41	42	47	DNC 95^{†}	467	372
48	Ross Hamilton	Ireland	73^{†}	40	45	58	38	46	50	56	46	452	379
49	Marton Beliczay	Hungary	54	51	64^{†}	29	57	43	45	61	41	445	381
50	Brendan Wilton	Canada	46	32	55	39	BFD 95^{†}	48	38	29	DNF 95	477	382
51	Kaspar Andresen	Denmark	66^{†}	66	41	62	51	51	35	46	42	460	394
52	Harry Briddon	Great Britain	49	53	57	56	36	DNC 95^{†}	57	50	47	500	405
53	Oliver Tweddell	Australia	16	43	23	24	61	61	DNC 95^{†}	DNC 95	DNC 95	513	418
54	Efe Kuyumcu	Turkey	53	78	50	59	37	42	56	44	DSQ 95^{†}	514	419
55	Li Zhen	China	40	45	44	71	62	53	58	52	DNC 95^{†}	520	425
56	Michał Jodłowski	Poland	67	65	54	84^{†}	55	54	44	41	48	512	428
57	Thomas Mohren	Netherlands	84^{†}	67	63	34	45	56	60	55	50	514	430
58	Benjamin Montagut	France	59	54	61	51	59	62^{†}	59	49	40	494	432
59	Rob Coutts	New Zealand	57	58	72^{†}	60	52	50	52	59	45	505	433
60	Adam Nicholson	Canada	60	48	58	50	54	57	76	57	DNC 95^{†}	555	460
61	Silvan Hofer	Switzerland	55	74	56	75	44	52	54	DNF 95^{†}	53	558	463
62	Fordon Lamphere	United States	69	56	67	68	53	58	51	DNF 95^{†}	54	571	476
63	Marc Allain des Beauvais	France	75	69	69	82^{†}	58	55	63	54	51	576	494
64	Allen Burrell	Great Britain	51	50	49	80	63	49	64	DNC 95^{†}	DNC 95	596	501
65	Rob Hemming	Canada	58	62	53	67	64	DNC 95^{†}	46	67	DNC 95	607	512
66	Valentin Nedylakov	Bulgaria	56	75	74	79^{†}	72	71	66	64	55	612	533
67	Tauras Rymonis	Lithuania	85	77	71	43	46	59	62	DNS 95^{†}	DNC 95	633	538
68	Ben Leibowitz	United States	72	72	80	87^{†}	67	70	67	60	52	627	540
69	Mikael Minos	France	65	68	83	77	65	66	55	65	DNC 95^{†}	639	544
70	Dimitar Vangelov	Bulgaria	19	64	65	73	66	DNC 95^{†}	68	DNC 95	DNC 95	640	545
71	Dirk Seret	Australia	76	61	86^{†}	85	75	69	70	62	49	633	547
72	Patrik Deutscher	Czech Republic	63	57	85	DNF 95^{†}	68	68	72	58	DNC 95	661	566
73	George Cooper	Great Britain	86	82	66	49	56	64	69	DNC 95^{†}	DNC 95	662	567
74	Akif Muslubas	Turkey	27	28	51	83	DNF 95^{†}	DNC 95	DNC 95	DNC 95	DNC 95	664	569
75	Thomas Gautschi	Switzerland	62	71	68	70	73	63	79	DNC 95^{†}	DNC 95	676	581
76	Julian Smith	Great Britain	79	85	73	61	60	65	65	DNC 95^{†}	DNC 95	678	583
77	Simon Percival	Great Britain	71	79	78	63	71	67	71	DNC 95^{†}	DNC 95	690	595
78	Rob McMillan	Australia	28	49	46	DNF 95^{†}	DNC 95	DNC 95	DNC 95	DNC 95	DNC 95	693	598
79	Henrik Elmer Nielsen	Denmark	77	92	79	69	74	DNC 95^{†}	61	63	DNC 95	705	610
80	Martin Hughes	Great Britain	52	70	59	57	DNC 95^{†}	DNC 95	DNF 95	DNC 95	DNC 95	713	618
81	Simon Pettit	Great Britain	78	90	77	72	69	DNF 95^{†}	73	66	DNC 95	715	620
82	Andy Denison	Great Britain	81	83	75	65	70	DNC 95^{†}	74	DNS 95	DNC 95	733	638
83	Damien Boulan	France	68	76	DNF 95^{†}	53	DNF 95	DNC 95	75	DNS 95	DNC 95	747	652
84	Philippe Lobert	France	74	81	82	66	DNF 95^{†}	DNC 95	78	DNC 95	DNC 95	761	666
85	John Mackie	Great Britain	80	73	76	78	DNF 95^{†}	DNC 95	DNC 95	DNC 95	DNC 95	782	687
86	Regis Baumgarten	France	89	84	89	81	77	DNC 95^{†}	77	DNC 95	DNC 95	782	687
87	Christophe Jean	France	87	91	81	86	76	DNF 95^{†}	DNF 95	DNC 95	DNC 95	801	706
88	Richard Hart	Great Britain	93	86	87	74	DNC 95^{†}	DNC 95	DNC 95	DNC 95	DNC 95	815	720
89	Philippe le Frapper	France	92	88	84	76	DNF 95^{†}	DNC 95	DNF 95	DNC 95	DNC 95	815	720
90	Jack Arnell	Great Britain	83	80	DNF 95^{†}	DNC 95	DNC 95	DNC 95	DNF 95	DNC 95	DNC 95	828	733
91	Tony Lock	Great Britain	82	87	DNC 95^{†}	DNC 95	DNC 95	DNC 95	DNC 95	DNC 95	DNC 95	834	739
92	Cedric Hollier	France	88	89	DNS 95^{†}	DNC 95	DNC 95	DNC 95	DNF 95	DNC 95	DNC 95	842	747
93	Rory Barnes	Great Britain	91	94	88	DNF 95^{†}	DNC 95	DNC 95	DNC 95	DNC 95	DNC 95	843	748
94	Mark Harper	Great Britain	90	93	DNF 95^{†}	DNC 95	DNC 95	DNC 95	DNC 95	DNC 95	DNC 95	848	753

Legend: BFD – Black flag disqualification; DNC – Did not come to the starting area; DNF – Did not finish; DSQ – Disqualified; OCS – On the course side of the starting line; RDG – Redress given; RDGa – Redress given with average points; † – Discarded race not counted in the overall result;
