= 2017 Finn Gold Cup =

Sailing competition in Hungary

Event title
- Edition: 62nd

Event details
- Venue: Balatonföldvár, Hungary
- Dates: 1–10 September
- Titles: 1

Competitors
- Competitors: 113
- Competing nations: 32

Results
- (gold) Gold: (Sweden) Max Salminen
- (silver) Silver: (France) Jonathan Lobert
- (bronze) Bronze: (Netherlands) Nicholas Heiner

The 2017 Finn Gold Cup was held in Balatonföldvár, Hungary 1–10 September 2017.

== Results ==
As of end of regatta

Results of individual races
Pos	Helmsman	Country	I	II	III	IV	V	VI	VII	VIII	MR	Tot	Pts
Gold medal	Max Salminen	Sweden	9	4	17^{†}	1	6	6	5		16	64	47
Silver medal	Jonathan Lobert	France	2	14	9	2	8	60^{†}	3		10	108	48
Bronze medal	Nicholas Heiner	Netherlands	20	9	2	21^{†}	1	3	13		2	71	50
4	Ed Wright	Great Britain	1	58^{†}	1	19	4	5	8		12	108	50
5	Zsombor Berecz	Hungary	3	6	12	37^{†}	10	16	2		4	90	53
6	Ioannis Mitakis	Greece	15	10	3	10	11	21^{†}	4		6	80	59
7	Piotr Kula	Poland	5	7	14	16	68^{†}	1	17		20	148	80
8	Facundo Olezza	Argentina	28	2	4	3	BFD 114^{†}	12	16		18	197	83
9	Milan Vujasinovic	Croatia	31	8	39^{†}	4	5	13	23		8	131	92
10	Anders Pedersen	Norway	DSQ 114^{†}	12	11	11	31	7	9		14	209	95
11	Oskari Muhonen	Finland	21	23	5	41	18	2	54^{†}	11		175	121
12	Henry Wetherell	Great Britain	11	34	20	9	3	45	10	60^{†}		192	132
13	Jake Lilley	Australia	13	56	10	DSQ 114^{†}	2	4	7	42		248	134
14	Max Kohlhoff	Germany	10	20	27	BFD 114^{†}	19	22	21	15		248	134
15	Oliver Tweddell	Australia	6	42	25	6	12	31	24	45^{†}		191	146
16	Jorge Zarif	Brazil	UFD 114^{†}	11	6	43	33	25	1	30		263	149
17	Deniss Karpak	Estonia	18	3	30	24	22	29	37^{†}	36		199	162
18	Ondřej Teplý	Czech Republic	8	13	34	7	54^{†}	20	51	34		221	167
19	Nils Theuninck	Switzerland	45^{†}	16	26	34	28	8	36	19		212	167
20	Josip Olujic	Croatia	23	15	40^{†}	32	20	40	12	25		207	167
21	Ben Cornish	Great Britain	16	30	8	12	47^{†}	36	29	37		215	168
22	Tom Ramshaw	Canada	12	55	24	18	32	BFD 114^{†}	22	12		289	175
23	Pic Fabian	France	14	66^{†}	21	35	15	15	25	50		241	175
24	Arkadiy Kistanov	Russia	42	50	UFD 114^{†}	5	9	11	32	28		291	177
25	Nenad Bugarin	Croatia	4	1	7	BFD 114^{†}	7	RET 114	6	41		294	180
26	Pablo Guitián	Spain	35	27	22	13	24	26	38	48^{†}		233	185
27	Phillip Kasueske	Germany	34	21	41	23	16	27	31	72^{†}		265	193
28	Mikolaj Lahn	Poland	30	5	18	39	70^{†}	10	40	58		270	200
29	Alican Kaynar	Turkey	19	54	43	BFD 114^{†}	27	18	18	22		315	201
30	Joan Cardona	Spain	26	35	31	RDG 29.3	21	33	30	52^{†}		257.3	205.3
31	Lars Johan Brodtkorb	Norway	17	19	38	22	45	54	11	71^{†}		277	206
32	Egor Terpigorev	Russia	29	61^{†}	42	14	37	23	27	35		268	207
33	Alejandro Muscat	Spain	43	22	28	31	49	17	55^{†}	20		265	210
34	Filippo Baldassari	Italy	22	29	19	44	61^{†}	34	19	47		275	214
35	Alessio Spadoni	Italy	46	25	36	26	36	19	26	73^{†}		287	214
36	Luke Muller	United States	48	32	16	17	23	47	39	56^{†}		278	222
37	Johannes Pettersson	Sweden	36	52^{†}	15	15	50	24	33	51		276	224
38	Tapio Nirkko	Finland	DSQ 114^{†}	47	13	8	17	RET 114	20	13		346	232
39	Evgenii Deev	Russia	33	51	48	BFD 114^{†}	14	39	15	33		347	233
40	Fionn Lyden	Ireland	32	36	32	51	34	55^{†}	35	18		293	238
41	Peter McCoy	Great Britain	39	33	23	28	60	43	14	64^{†}		304	240
42	Enrico Voltolini	Italy	7	44	37	BFD 114^{†}	56	14	28	65		365	251
43	André Hojen Christiansen	Denmark	38	24	45	45	30	28	52	68^{†}		330	262
44	Jock Calvert	Australia	47	45	33	42	43	9	49	76^{†}		344	268
45	Lewis Brake	Australia	56	17	47	29.5	39	76^{†}	42	38		344.5	268.5
46	Hector Simpson	Great Britain	41	39	49	47	51	62^{†}	34	14		337	275
47	Oisin Mcclelland	Ireland	24	67	46	25	72^{†}	49	43	31		357	285
48	Lauret Hay	France	64	18	52	61	79^{†}	30	45	21		370	291
49	Antoine Devineau	France	55	37	68^{†}	57	13	59	61	16		366	298
50	Valerian Lebrun	France	59	31	54	62	29	50	68^{†}	17		370	302
51	Simon Gorgels	Germany	44	71	35	52	25	32	47	DNF 114^{†}		420	306
52	Guillaume Boisard	France	51	38	50	40	46	38	46	63^{†}		372	309
53	Taavi Valter Taveter	Estonia	49	40	60	48	42	52	73^{†}	29		393	320
54	Cameron Tweedle	Great Britain	52	26	44	27	52	73	50	DNC 114^{†}		438	324
55	Mikael Hyrylainen	Finland	25	75	29	38	65	41	56	85^{†}		414	329
56	Micael Maier	Czech Republic	60^{†}	49	56	49	35	53	60	32		394	334
57	Kyle Martin	Canada	66^{†}	41	55	54	58	44	63	40		421	355
58	James Skulczuk	Great Britain	62	43	62	55	48	37	74^{†}	53		434	360
59	Victor Gorostegui	Spain	40	81^{†}	53	33	DNE 114	56	41	26		444	363
60	Andrii Gusenko	Ukraine	37	UFD 114^{†}	51	20	57	63	44	94		480	366
61	Brendan McCarty	New Zealand	54	70	71	53	26	35	58	79^{†}		446	367
62	Dmitriy Petrov	Russia	27	63	70	36	80^{†}	58	57	67		458	378
63	Lukasz Lesinski	Poland	53	46	59	59	75^{†}	69	48	49		458	383
64	Can Akdurak	Turkey	50	28	74	50	83	71	53	87^{†}		496	409
65	Santiago Falasca	Argentina	57	82^{†}	69	58	63	42	79	43		493	411
66	Andre Mirsky	Brazil	63	73	61	46	44	74	DNC 114^{†}	69		544	430
67	Carlos Ordónez Sánchez	Spain	79	48	81^{†}	69	76	68	72	27		520	439
68	Aleksander Kulyukin	Russia	58	57	66	66	73	57	70	DNC 114^{†}		561	447
69	Rockal Evans	Bermuda	61	68	58	67	89^{†}	48	59	88		538	449
70	Rob McMillan	Australia	65	64	UFD 114^{†}	56	38	92	62	77		568	454
71	Marc Allain des Beauvais	France	76	79	85	86^{†}	41	61	64	54		546	460
72	Markus Bettum	Great Britain	68	65	57	63	91	93^{†}	66	62		565	472
73	Waltteri Moisio	Finland	71	89	79	BFD 114^{†}	71	70	75	24		593	479
74	Jan Orel	Slovenia	82	85^{†}	72	72	40	66	67	84		568	483
75	Taras Havrysh	Ukraine	69	53	65	73	85	BFD 114^{†}	69	70		598	484
76	Joe McMillan	Australia	67	76	64	DNF 114^{†}	69	82	65	61		598	484
77	Elemér Péter Haidekker	Hungary	86	84	67	78	53	46	71	101^{†}		586	485
78	Callum Dixon	Great Britain	72	60	75	64	87	51	77	98^{†}		584	486
79	Liam Orel	Slovenia	74	DNC 114^{†}	80	92	59	64	78	46		607	493
80	Domonkos Németh	Hungary	93	104^{†}	86	68	55	89	83	23		601	497
81	Antal Székely	Hungary	75	59	73	70	93^{†}	75	91	86		622	529
82	Jesse Kylanpaa	Finland	81	103	63	71	66	67	80	DNC 114^{†}		645	531
83	Miguel Cabrerizo	Spain	105^{†}	87	82	84	62	77	98	44		639	534
84	Nicolaus Schmidt	Germany	70	72	91	76	67	103	76	DNC 114^{†}		669	555
85	Ákos Lukáts	Hungary	88	94^{†}	93	65	74	83	82	75		654	560
86	Martin Jozif	Czech Republic	78	102^{†}	77	81	86	81	93	66		664	562
87	Botond Berecz	Hungary	95	69	83	77	77	104^{†}	89	78		672	568
88	Oleksandr Gusenko	Ukraine	73	96	95	74	104^{†}	100	87	57		686	582
89	Andrzej Romanowski	Poland	84	77	89	80	107^{†}	65	92	95		689	582
90	Valentin Klymentyev	Ukraine	96	83	94	85	81	86	99^{†}	59		683	584
91	Jozef Jochovic	Czech Republic	85	74	78	79	99^{†}	91	84	93		683	584
92	Ahmad Ahmadi	Iran	101^{†}	78	88	60	90	80	90	99		686	585
93	Vladimir Skalicky	Czech Republic	77	93	98^{†}	82	84	87	81	82		684	586
94	Pallay Tibor	Hungary	80	98	76	BFD 114^{†}	94	78	85	80		705	591
95	Joe Stocker	Great Britain	104^{†}	91	96	96	64	79	96	81		707	603
96	Martin Tenke	Hungary	94	101^{†}	84	75	95	72	97	91		709	608
97	Örs Németh	Hungary	83	88	87	89	82	84	102^{†}	100		715	613
98	John Alexander	Australia	87	62	92	95	92	88	104	DNC 114^{†}		734	620
99	Péter Haidekker	Hungary	89	92	90	83	100	90	101^{†}	89		734	633
100	Moritz Spitzauer	Austria	108^{†}	106	105	101	88	95	95	55		753	645
101	Gerardo Seeliger	Spain	97	90	102^{†}	94	101	97	86	83		750	648
102	Zsolt Mészáros	Hungary	100	97	101	88	109^{†}	102	94	74		765	656
103	Zoltán Bartos	Hungary	98	86	97	98	103	85	109^{†}	97		773	664
104	Richard Hart	Great Britain	106	105	109	100	106	105	110^{†}	39		780	670
105	Denny Jeschull	Germany	91	80	103	90	105	BFD 114^{†}	100	102		785	671
106	László Taubert	Hungary	90	95	104^{†}	102	102	98	88	96		775	671
107	Mihány Zoltán Demeczky	Hungary	102	100	106^{†}	93	98	96	106	90		791	685
108	Zsigmond Kántor	Hungary	103	99	99	91	96	101	103	DNC 114^{†}		806	692
109	Péter Sipos	Hungary	99	108^{†}	108	87	108	94	107	92		803	695
110	Yuri Polovinkin	Russia	92	107	100	97	97	106	105	DNC 114^{†}		818	704
111	Michal Hrivnák	Slovakia	107	109	107	99	78	99	108	DNC 114^{†}		821	707
112	Zsuzsa Komm	Hungary	109	DNC 114^{†}	110	103	DNC 114	107	111	103		871	757
113	Antonis Tsotras	Greece	DNC 114^{†}	DNC 114	DNC 114	DNC 114	DNC 114	DNC 114	DNC 114	DNC 114		912	798

Legend: – Qualified for medal race(s); BFD – Black flag disqualification; DNC – Did not come to the starting area; DNF – Did not finish; DSQ – Disqualified; RDG – Redress given; UFD – "U" flag disqualification; † – Discarded race not counted in the overall result;
