= Sailing at the 2012 Summer Olympics – Finn =

Men's Finn at the Games of the XXX Olympiad
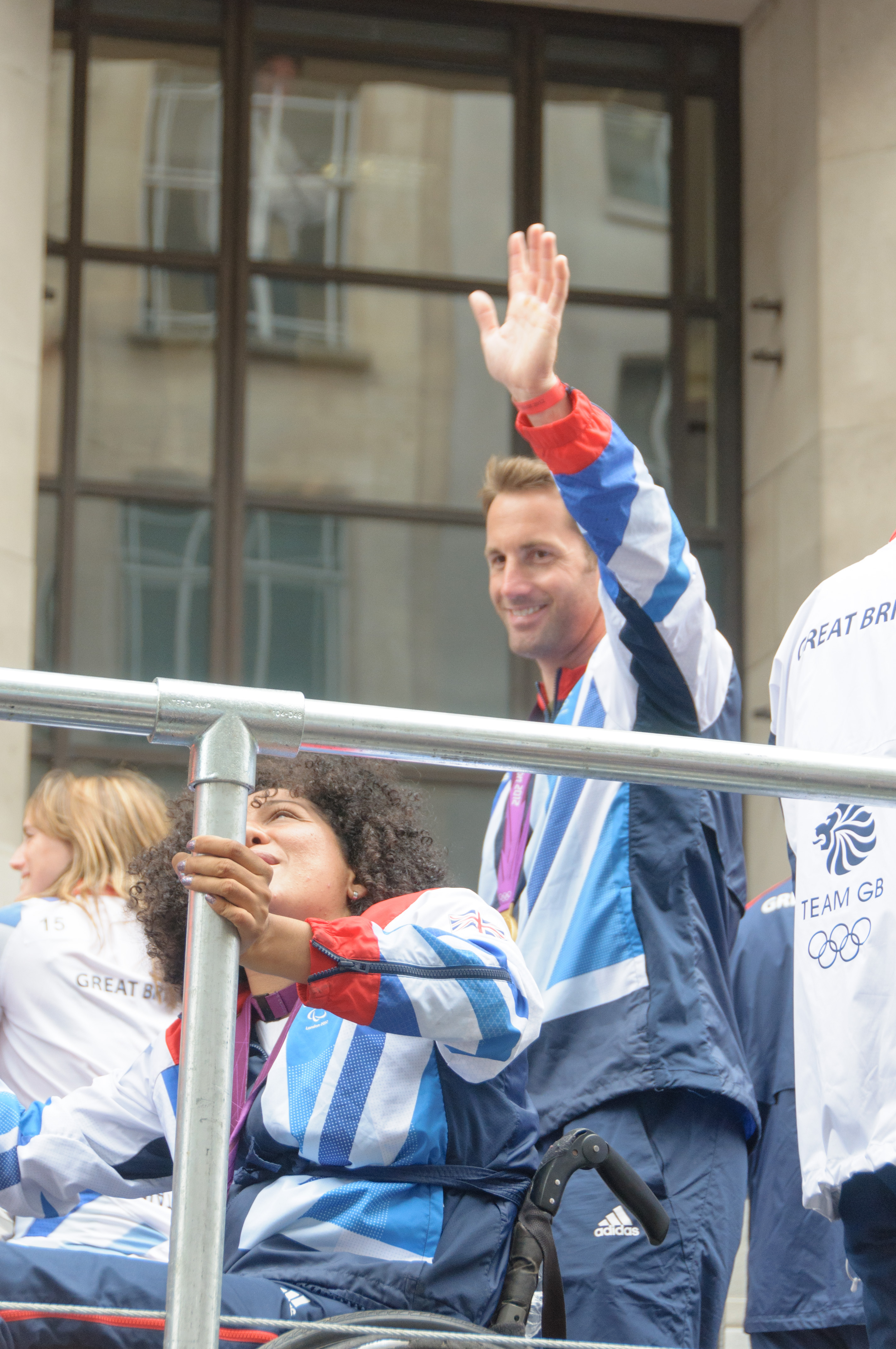
- Ben Ainslie, gold medallist, pictured at the Our Greatest Team Parade on 10 September 2012
- Venue: Weymouth and Portland National Sailing Academy
- Dates: 29 July – 5 August
- Competitors: 24 from 24 nations

Medalists
1st place, gold medalist(s)		Ben Ainslie	Great Britain
2nd place, silver medalist(s)		Jonas Høgh-Christensen	Denmark
3rd place, bronze medalist(s)		Jonathan Lobert	France

The Men's Finn was one of ten sailing events at the 2012 Summer Olympics program that took place at the Weymouth and Portland National Sailing Academy. The racing took place on Nothe, West, and South course locations all of which were outside Portland Harbour. 24 sailors competed in the scheduled 10 races with the top 10 overall from this qualifying series competing in a medal race, where each position scored double points. It was the sixteenth appearance of the Finn event in the Summer Olympics since the first in 1952.

The medal race was held on 5 August 2012. Reigning Olympic champion Ben Ainslie of Great Britain and Denmark's Jonas Høgh-Christensen finished in first and second respectively despite finishing in the bottom two positions in the medal race. The double points system and lack of discard for this race meant that Ainslie only needed to finish ahead of Høgh-Christensen to secure his fifth Olympic medal and fourth gold, making him the most successful Olympic sailor in history. This was despite Høgh-Christensen having led the standings every day during the rest of the event. Jonathan Lobert of France overtook Dutchman Pieter-Jan Postma in the standings after winning the medal race.

== Background ==
The Finn is a single handed cat-rigged sailing dinghy designed by Rickard Sarby in 1949 for the 1952 Summer Olympics in Helsinki. The boat was then used at every subsuquent Olympic Games until 2020, with the 2012 Games being its sixteenth appearance.

Ainslie went into the event with the opportunity to become the most successful Olympic sailor in history, overtaking Paul Elvstrøm of Denmark. Elvstrøm won four gold medals between 1948 and 1960, the first in the Firefly and the latter three in the Finn. Ainslie had three gold medals which he won in 2000, 2004 and 2008, and he had also won a silver medal at the 1996 Olympics, where he was beaten by Robert Scheidt in the Laser. A gold medal in this event would put him above Elvstrøm in the medal tables as a result of his silver medal.

At the previous Olympic Games in Beijing, Ainslie was able to win gold in the Finn class for the second consecutive Games, with that being his third gold medal overall. The second placed sailor at those games, Zach Railey, qualified to compete in these games after finishing 9th at the 2011 Worlds. Frenchman Guillaume Florent, who won bronze in 2008, was not present at the event.

== Qualification ==
Out of the 24 available entries to the event, 18 of them were decided by the results of the 2011 World Championship, with each nation being limited to only one entry into the competition. Despite fellow Brit Giles Scott winning the event and two other British sailors, Edward Wright and Andrew Mills finishing in the top 10 of that event, Ainslie, who finished 11th, was selected to represent Great Britain at the Games. However, he went on to win the 2012 Finn Gold Cup after this selection for the Olympics, where the remaining entries for this event were determined. Matthias Miller secured an entry for Germany, but he failed to meet the German Olympic Sports Confederation's criteria of a top 10 finish at the event and so was not entered.

== Schedule ==
●	Practice race	●	Race on Nothe	●	Race on West	●	Race on South	●	Medal race on Nothe

Date	July						August												
Date	26 Thu	27 Fri	28 Sat	29 Sun		30 Mon	31 Tue	1 Wed	2 Thu	3 Fri	4 Sat	5 Sun	6 Mon	7 Tue	8 Wed	9 Thu	10 Fri	11 Sat	12 Sun
Races			●	●	●	● ●	● ●	Spare day	● ●	● ●	Spare day	●							

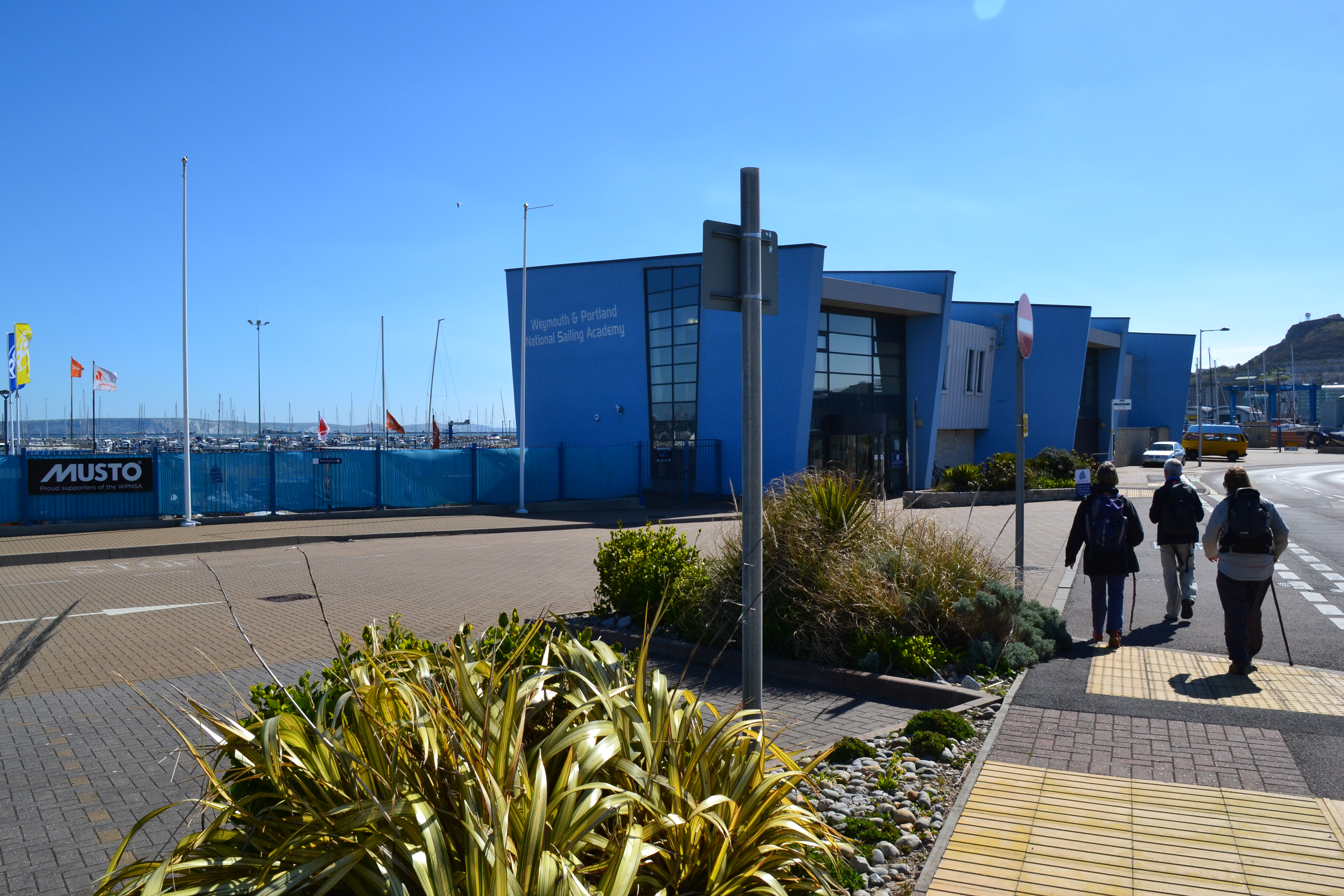
The Weymouth and Portland National Sailing Academy clubhouse

== Course areas and course configurations ==
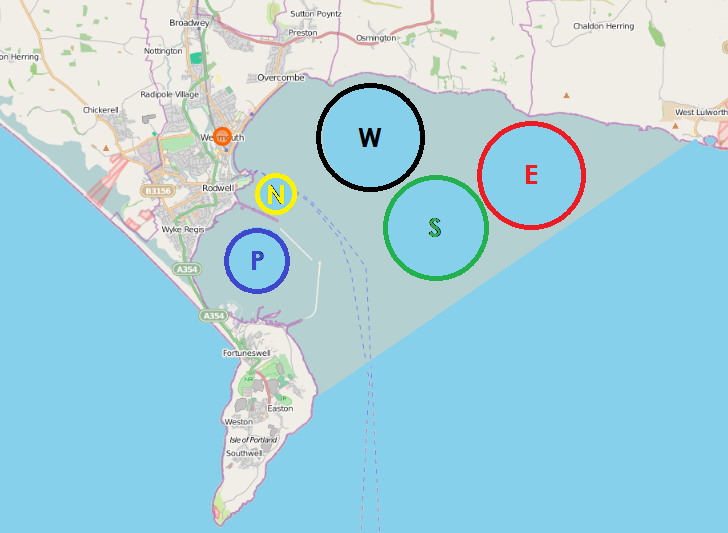
Course areas: Portland (P) Nothe (N) West (W) / South (S) East (E)

All sailing events took place at Weymouth and Portland National Sailing Academy (WPNSA) on the Isle of Portland in Dorset, with the Finn events taking place outside the harbour walls, on the Nothe, West, and South course locations. The medal race took place on the Nothe course to provide a spectator-friendly viewing area for those in Weymouth. WPNSA, which opened in 2000, was chosen to host the sailing events at these games in 2005.

The target time for the races was 60 minutes for the qualification series and 30 minutes for the medal race.

== Competition format ==
The low-point scoring system was used for this and all Olympic sailing events. This system works by awarding points that correlate with finishing position in each race. For example, for finishing first in race 1, Jonas Høgh-Christensen earned 1 point. This aligns with each position in the event. Any competitor that fails to finish or is disqualified is given 25 points, one more point than competitors in the event. Each competitor had one discard in the opening series, which was to be taken by their worst finishing position except in the case of a non excludable disqualification (DNE). The medal race, which included the top ten competitors from the first ten races, gave double points and results could not be discarded.

== Preview ==
In the lead-up to the competition, Ainslie was regarded as the favourite to win following gold medals in the Finn in both 2004 and 2008. Other favourites going into the event included American Zach Railey who won silver at the 2008 Olympics as well as Pieter-Jan Postma of the Netherlands, Jonathan Lobert of France and double European Champion Rafael Trujillo who won silver in the event in 2004. Two time world champion in the class Jonas Høgh-Christensen of Denmark described himself as a "dark horse" and "not one of the favourites to take a medal".

== Results ==
Results of individual races
Pos	Helmsman	Country	I	II	III	IV	V	VI	VII	VIII	IX	X	MR	Tot	Pts
Gold medal	Ben Ainslie	Great Britain	2	2	6	12^{†}	4	3	1	3	6	1	18	58.0	46.0
Silver medal	Jonas Høgh-Christensen	Denmark	1	1	2	7	1	2	8^{†}	4	5	3	20	54.0	46.0
Bronze medal	Jonathan Lobert	France	9	4	4	2	6	7	5	10^{†}	3	7	2	59.0	49.0
4	Pieter-Jan Postma	Netherlands	5	10	3	4	20^{†}	13	2	2	1	2	10	72.0	52.0
5	Ivan Kljaković Gašpić	Croatia	3	3	7	9	5	6	3	7	4	10^{†}	8	65.0	55.0
6	Vasilij Žbogar	Slovenia	8	6	5	3	8	5	9^{†}	6	2	6	14	72.0	63.0
7	Dan Slater	New Zealand	7	11	1	6	17^{†}	11	6	15	8	14	4	100.0	83.0
8	Rafael Trujillo	Spain	12	12	12	23^{†}	7	4	15	1	13	4	6	109.0	86.0
9	Daniel Birgmark	Sweden	17^{†}	5	14	1	9	9	10	12	10	8	12	107.0	90.0
10	Tapio Nirkko	Finland	11	13	8	5	3	12	4	5	15	17^{†}	16	109.0	92.0
11	Deniss Karpak	Estonia	14^{†}	9	11	11	11	1	7	13	11	11		99.0	85.0
12	Zach Railey	United States	10	15	13	17	2	8	12	8	12	19^{†}		116.0	97.0
13	Brendan Casey	Australia	DNF 25^{†}	7	DPI 16	14	10	17	19	9	9	5		131.0	106.0
14	Ioannis Mitakis	Greece	4	21	10	8	OCS 25^{†}	10	20	19	7	9		133.0	108.0
15	Greg Douglas	Canada	16	24^{†}	16	13	12	18	13	17	20	12		160.0	137.0
16	Piotr Kula	Poland	DSQ 25^{†}	16	17	16	13	20	OCS 25	11	14	16		173.0	148.0
17	Eduard Skornyakov	Russia	13	8	22^{†}	15	19	22	16	16	22	22		175.0	153.0
18	Alican Kaynar	Turkey	18	14	18	18	DNE 25	14	11	22^{†}	16	20		176.0	154.0
19	Oleksiy Borysov	Ukraine	RDG 21	RDG 18.6	19	19	15	19	23^{†}	14	17	18		183.6	160.6
20	Jorge Zarif	Brazil	15	20	15	20	16	24^{†}	14	21	19	21		185.0	161.0
21	Michal Maier	Czech Republic	19	18	21	10	18	23^{†}	18	20	23	15		185.0	162.0
22	Filippo Baldassari	Italy	20	23^{†}	24	21	14	21	17	18	18	13		188.0	164.0
23	Florian Raudaschl	Austria	6	19	23	24	OCS 25^{†}	15	21	24	24	23		204.0	179.0
24	Gong Lei	China	OCS 25	17	20	22	OCS 25^{†}	16	22	23	21	24		215.0	190.0

Scoring system: low-point system; Source:
Legend: – Qualified for medal race(s); DNE – Non excludable disqualification; DNF – Did not finish; DSQ – Disqualified; OCS – On the course side of the starting line; † – Discarded race not counted in the overall result;

== Daily standings ==
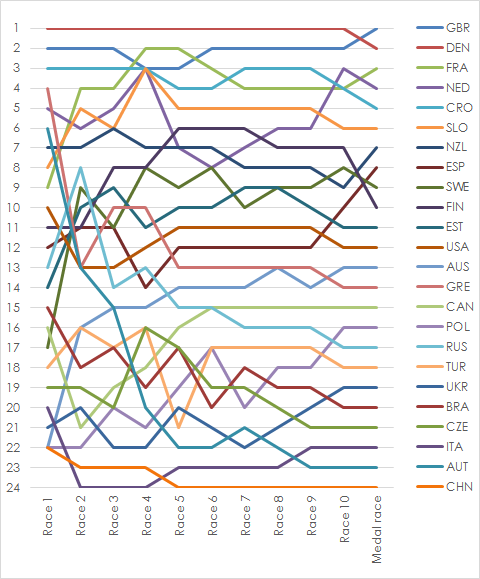
Graph showing the daily standings in the Men's Finn during the 2012 Summer Olympics
