= Sailing at the 2016 Summer Olympics – Finn =

Men's Finn at the Games of the XXXI Olympiad
- Line drawing of the Finn
- Venue: Marina da Glória
- Dates: 9–16 August 2016
- Competitors: 23 from 23 nations
- Winning total: 36.0 points

Medalists
1st place, gold medalist(s)		Giles Scott	Great Britain
2nd place, silver medalist(s)		Vasilij Žbogar	Slovenia
3rd place, bronze medalist(s)		Caleb Paine	United States

The men's Finn competition at the 2016 Summer Olympics in Rio de Janeiro took place between 9–16 August at Marina da Glória. Eleven races (the last one a medal race) were held. British sailor Giles Scott was declared gold medallist before the competition ended, having an unassailable lead before the medal race.

== Schedule ==
Tue 9 Aug	Wed 10 Aug	Thu 11 Aug	Fri 12 Aug	Sat 13 Aug	Sun 14 Aug	Mon 15 Aug	Tue 16 Aug
Race 1 Race 2	Race 3 Race 4	Race 5 Race 6	Rest day	Race 7 Race 8	Race 9 Race 10	Rest day	Medal race

== Results ==
Results of individual races
Pos	Helmsman	Country	I	II	III	IV	V	VI	VII	VIII	IX	X	MR	Tot	Pts
Gold medal	Giles Scott	Great Britain	17^{†}	3	2	1	11	1	1	3	8	2	4	53.0	36.0
Silver medal	Vasilij Žbogar	Slovenia	3	2	7	10	15^{†}	9	5	4	9	8	12	83.0	68.0
Bronze medal	Caleb Paine	United States	7	12	21^{†}	3	14	2	17	7	10	4	2	97.0	76.0
4	Jorge Zarif	Brazil	4	8	11	22^{†}	2	19	2	13	15	9	6	109.0	87.0
5	Ivan Kljaković Gašpić	Croatia	6	8	10	15^{†}	8	8	4	10	2	13	20	104.0	89.0
6	Max Salminen	Sweden	15^{†}	13	13	9	7	5	6	11	7	5	16	105.0	90.0
7	Josh Junior	New Zealand	18	DSQ 24^{†}	14	14	5	3	18	2	4	6	8	116.0	92.0
8	Jake Lilley	Australia	16	UFD 24^{†}	8	6	6	4	3	5	23	16	10	121.0	97.0
9	Facundo Olezza	Argentina	1	11	19	18	16	22^{†}	10	6	1	7	14	123.0	101.0
10	Pieter-Jan Postma	Netherlands	14	13	12	4	4	6	14	1	19	DSQ 24^{†}	18	129.0	105.0
11	Ioannis Mitakis	Greece	12	DNF 24^{†}	3	2	13	12	21	9	13	3		112.0	88.0
12	Zsombor Berecz	Hungary	9	UFD 24^{†}	5	12	1	7	12	18	16	12		116.0	92.0
13	Alican Kaynar	Turkey	2	7	6	19^{†}	19	13	8	17	12	11		112.0	93.0
14	Jonathan Lobert	France	10	19^{†}	1	7	12	14	11	12	14	14		110.0	95.0
15	Tapio Nirkko	Finland	20	9	15	5	3	DNF 24^{†}	20	21	6	10		131.0	107.0
16	Jonas Høgh-Christensen	Denmark	13	4	4	DNF 24^{†}	10	11	16	16	17	20		133.0	109.0
17	Anders Pedersen	Norway	8	20	18	8	22^{†}	16	9	14	5	15		131.0	109.0
18	Giorgio Poggi	Italy	11	6	16	11	18	15	7	19^{†}	11	18		130.0	111.0
19	Alejandro Foglia	Uruguay	21	UFD 24^{†}	9	17	20	21	15	15	3	1		146.0	122.0
20	Deniss Karpak	Estonia	5	18	17	20	23^{†}	10	13	8	18	21		149.0	126.0
21	Tom Ramshaw	Canada	19	15	22^{†}	13	9	17	22	20	20	19		173.0	151.0
22	Gong Lei	China	22	DNF 24^{†}	20	16	21	20	19	22	21	17		202.0	178.0
23	Allan Julie	Seychelles	23^{†}	21	23	21	17	18	23	23	22	22		213.0	190.0

Scoring system: low-point system;
Legend: – Qualified for medal race(s); DNF – Did not finish; DSQ – Disqualified; UFD – "U" flag disqualification; † – Discarded race not counted in the overall result;
