= Finn Youth World Championship =

Sailing World Championship

The Finn Junior World Championship also referred to as the Silver Cup is an annual international sailing regatta for Finn (dinghy) with sailors under the age of 23. They are organized by the host club on behalf of the International Class Association and recognized by World Sailing, the sports IOC recognized governing body. The term masters refers to the minimum age of competitors which is currently for helms of any gender over 39.

== Events ==
Event			Host			Participation					Ref.
Ed.	Dates	Year	Host club	Location	Country	No.			Nat.	Cont	Ref.
1	6-16 Jan	1999		Melbourne	Australia						
2	11-16 Jun	2000	Weymouth and Portland National Sailing Academy	Isle of Portland	United Kingdom						
3	21-29 Sep	2001	Eastern Yacht Club, Marblehead	Marblehead	United States						
4	20-28 Jul	2002	Olympiakos Yacht Club	Athens	Greece						
5	11-24 Sep	2003		Cádiz	Spain						
6		2004		Rio de Janeiro	Brazil						
7	-	2005		Moscow	Russia						
8	-	2006		Split	Croatia						
9	18-26 Aug	2007	Moscow Sailing School	Moscow	Russia						
10	-	2008		Melbourne	Australia						
11	30 Jul-6 Aug	2009	Balatonfuredi Yacht Club	Lake Balaton	Hungary	51	51	0	18	3	
12	17-24 Aug	2010	St. Francis Yacht Club	San Francisco	United States	15	15	0	10	4	
13	23-30 Jul	2011	Moscow Sailing School	Moscow	Russia	37	37	0	14	3	
14	29 Jun-6 Jul	2012	Cercle Voile Bordeaux Carcans Maubuisson	Carcans-Maubuisson	France	24	24	0	12	2	
15	5-12 Jul	2013	Fraglia Vela Malcesine	Malcesine, Lake Garda	Italy	28	28	0	14	4	
16	4-11 Jul	2014	WSV Hoorn	Hoorn	Netherlands	32	32	0	17	4	
17	-	2015	Real Club Nautico Valencia	Valencia	Spain						
18	3-9 Jul	2016	Kaløvig Sailing Club	Skødstrup	Denmark	35	35	0	15	3	
19	20-27 Aug	2017	MVM Hungarian Power Companies Sport Club	Lake Balaton	Hungary	45	45	0	23	4	
20	25 Aug-31 Sep	2018	Sailing Club Jadro Koper	Koper	Slovenia	36	36	0	19	3	
21	14-20 Jul	2019	Circolo della Vela di Roma	Anzio	Italy	28	28	0	16	2	
22	15-21 Aug	2020	Club Nautique Canet Perpignan	Canet-en-Roussillon	France	12	13	0	7	2	
23	10-15 Jul	2021		Tihany, Balaton	Hungary	20	2	0	6	1	
24	-	2022		Malcesine, Lake Garda	Italy						
25	17-21 Jul	2023		Lake Como	Italy						

=== Medallists ===
Year	Ref.	Gold	Silver	Bronze
1999 Melbourne	Charlie Cumbley (GBR)	Georgios Kontogouris (GRE)	Clifton Webb (NZL)	
2000 Weymouth	Georgios Kontogouris (GRE)	Charlie Cumbley (GBR)	Kristian Åderman (SWE)	
2001 Marblehead	Chris Brittle (GBR)	Charlie Cumbley (GBR)	Stefan de Vries (NED)	
2002 Athens	Chris Brittle (GBR)	Marin Mišura (CRO)	Gašper Vinčec (CRO)	
2003 Cádiz	Marin Mišura (CRO)	Edward Greig (GBR)	Tapio Nirkko (FIN)	
2004 Rio de Janeiro	Tapio Nirkko (FIN)	Henry Raul Boening (BRA)		
2005 Moscow	Ivan Kljaković Gašpić (CRO)	Tapio Nirkko (FIN)	Nobert Wilandt (POL)	
2006 Split	Mark Andrews (GBR)	Henry Bagnall (GBR)	Piotr Kula (POL)	
2007 Moscow	Jan Kurfeld (GER)	Piotr Kula (POL)	Sergey Komissarov (RUS)	
2008 Melbourne	Giles Scott (GBR)	Piotr Kula (POL)	Frederico Melo (POR)	
2009 Balatonfüred	Jorge Zarif (BRA)	Egor Larinov (RUS)	Andriy Gusenko (UKR)	
2010 San Francisco	Luke Lawrence (USA)	Ioannis Mitakis (GRE)	Oliver Tweddell (AUS)	
2011 Moscow	Arkadiy Kistanov (RUS)	Miłosz Wojewski (POL)	Artur Ponieczyński (POL)	
2012 Maubuisson	Martin Robitaille (CAN)	Michał Jodłowski (POL)	Arkadiy Kistanov (RUS)	
2013 Malcesine	Jorge Zarif (BRA)	Jake Lilley (AUS)	Martin Robitaille (CAN)	
2014 Hoorn	Anders Pedersen (NOR)	Arkadiy Kistanov (RUS)	Nenad Bugarin (CRO)	
2015 Valencia	Ondřej Teplý (CZE)	Nenad Bugarin (CRO)	Lars Johan Brodtkorb (NOR)	
2016 Kaløvig	Phillip Kasüske (GER)	Ondřej Teplý (CZE)	Facundo Olezza (ARG)	
2017 Balatonfüred	Oskari Muhonen (FIN)	Facundo Olezza (ARG)	Fionn Lyden (IRL)	
2018 Koper	Ondřej Teplý (CZE)	Joan Cardona (ESP)	Hector Simpson (GBR)	
2019 Anzio	Oskari Muhonen (FIN)	Joan Cardona (ESP)	Nils Theuninck (SUI)	
2020 Canet	Oskari Muhonen (FIN)	Taavi Valter Taveter (EST)	Guillaume Boisard (FRA)	
2021 Tihany	Domonkos Németh (HUN)	Bence Rácz (HUN)	Levente Rácz (HUN)	

== See also ==
- Finn Gold Cup / Open Worlds
- Finn Masters World Championship
