= Sailing at the 2008 Summer Olympics – Finn =

Mixed Finn at the Games of the XXIX Olympiad
- Line drawing of the Finn
- Venue: Qingdao International Sailing Centre
- Dates: First race: 9 August 2008; Last race: 17 August 2008
- Competitors: 26 from 26 nations

Medalists
1st place, gold medalist(s)		Ben Ainslie	Great Britain
2nd place, silver medalist(s)		Zach Railey	United States
3rd place, bronze medalist(s)		Guillaume Florent	France

The Finn was a sailing event on the Sailing at the 2008 Summer Olympics program in Qingdao International Sailing Centre. Eleven races (the last one a medal race) were scheduled. Only nine races were completed, including the medal race, due to lack of wind. 26 sailors, on 26 boats, from 26 nations competed. Ten boats qualified for the medal race.

== Race schedule ==
●	Practice race	●	Race on Yellow	●	Race on Pink	●	Medal race on Yellow

Date	August																	
Date	7 Thu	8 Fri	9 Sat	10 Sun	11 Mon	12 Tue	13 Wed	14 Thu	15 Fri	16 Sat	17 Sun	18 Mon	19 Tue	20 Wed	21 Thu	22 Fri	23 Sat	24 Sun
Scheduled
Actual	PR		S1,2	S3,4	S5,6	Res	S7	No wind	S8	No wind	MR							

== Course areas and course configurations ==
For the Finn course areas A (Yellow) and E (Pink) were used. The location (36°2'23"N, 120°23'12"E) points to the center of the 0.6 nm radius Yellow course area and the location (36°2'44"N, 120°28'9"E) points to the center of the 0.75 nm radius Pink course area. The target time for the course was about 75 minutes for the races and 30 minutes for the medal race. The race management could choose from several course configurations.

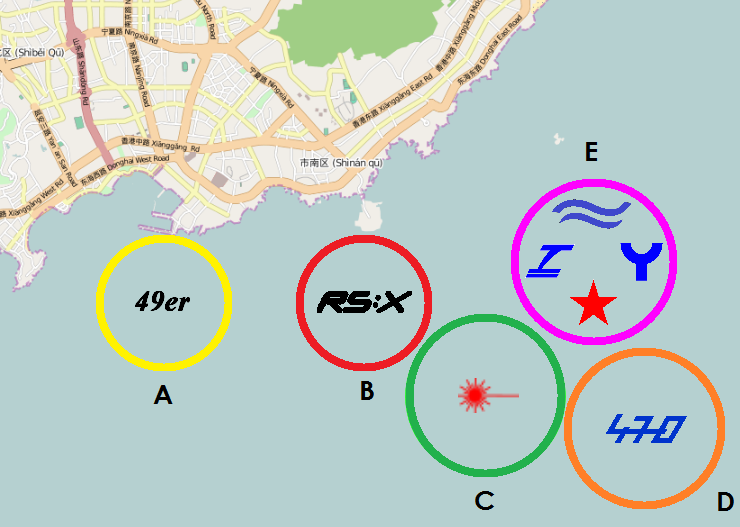
Course areas

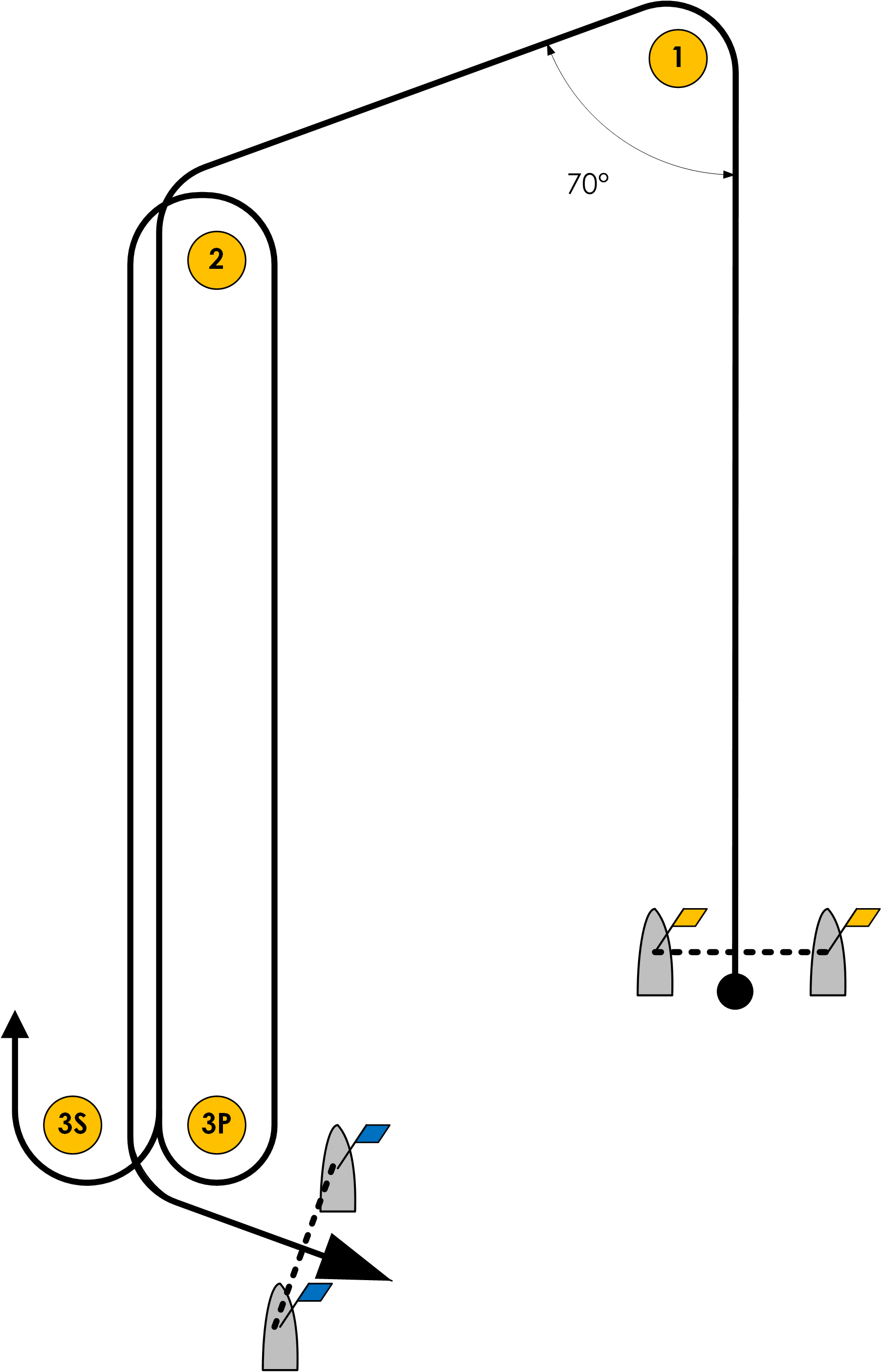
70° trapezoid outer course (O)

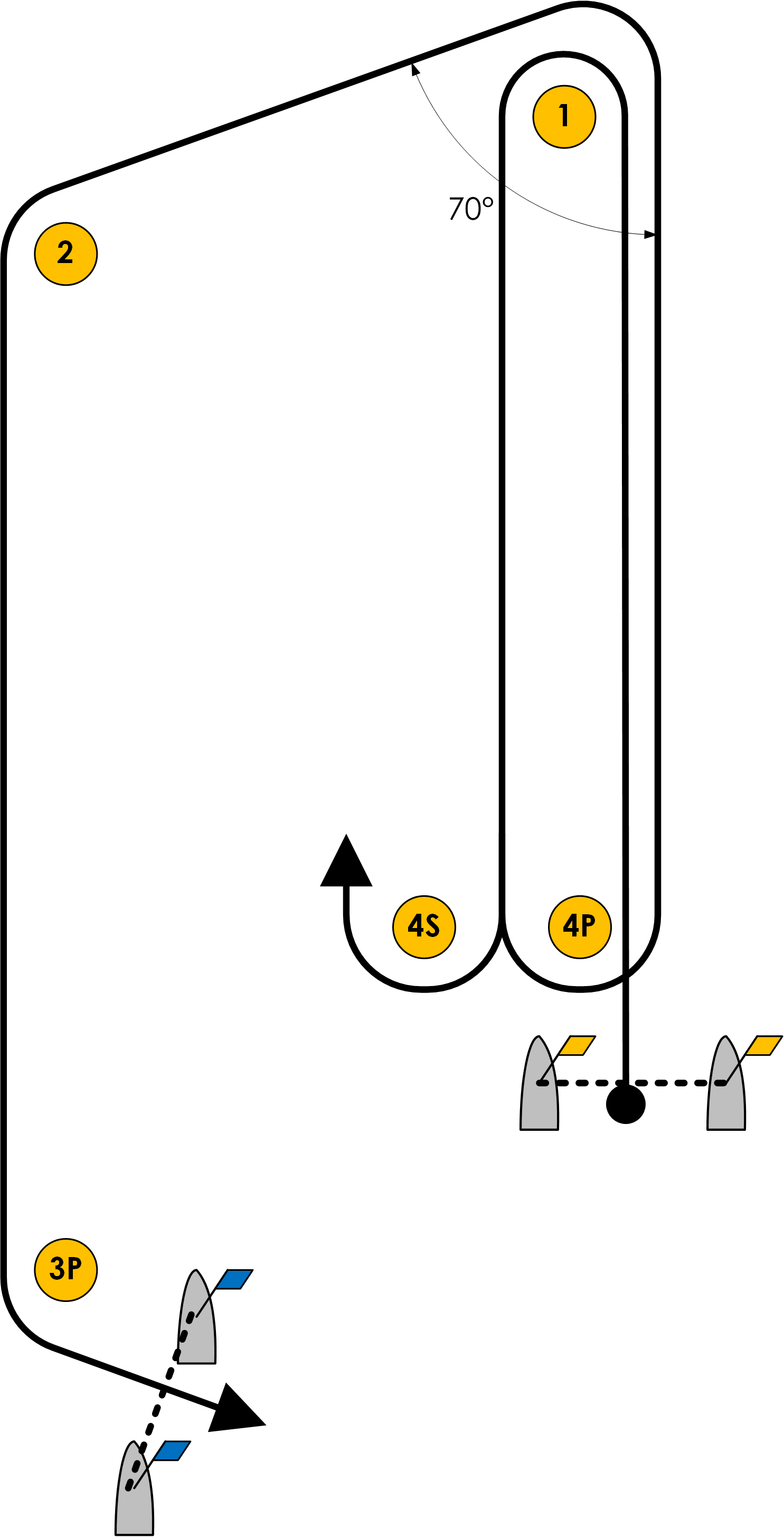
70° trapezoid inner course (I)

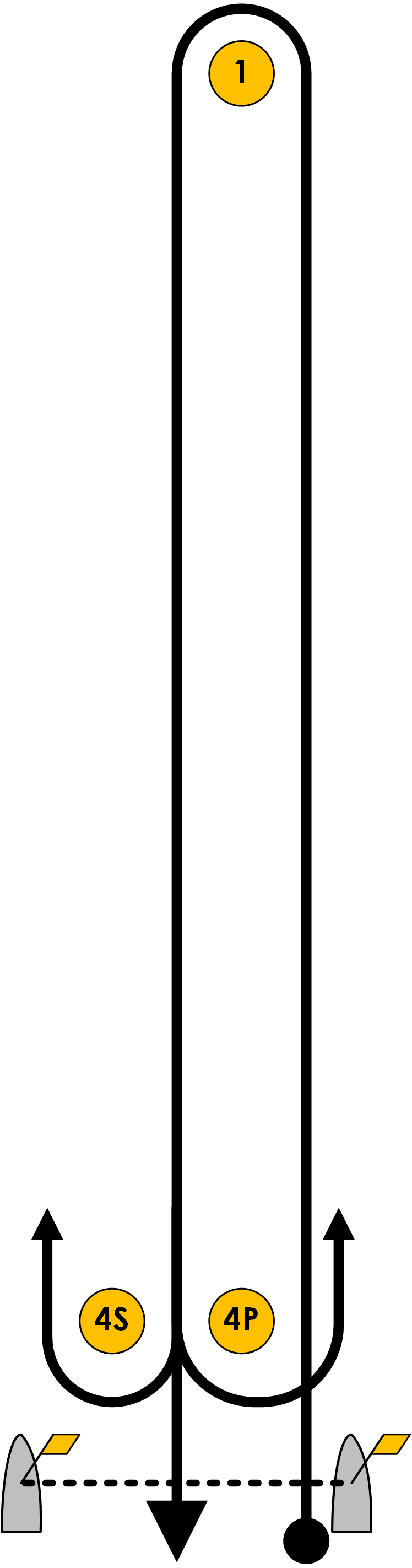
Windward-leeward course (W)

=== Outer courses ===
- O1: START – 1 – 2 – 3s/3p – 2 – 3p – FINISH
- O2: START – 1 – 2 – 3s/3p – 2 – 3s/3p – 2 – 3p – FINISH
- O3: START – 1 – 2 – 3s/3p – 2 – 3s/3p – 2 – 3s/3p – 2 – 3p – FINISH

=== Inner courses ===
- I1: START – 1 – 4s/4p – 1 – 2 – 3p – FINISH
- I2: START – 1 – 4s/4p – 1 – 4s/4p – 1 – 2 – 3p – FINISH
- I3: START – 1 – 4s/4p – 1 – 4s/4p – 1 – 4s/4p – 1 – 2 – 3p – FINISH

=== Windward-leeward courses ===
- W2: START – 1 – 4s/4p – 1 – FINISH
- W3: START – 1 – 4s/4p – 1 – 4s/4p – 1 – FINISH
- W4: START – 1 – 4s/4p – 1 – 4s/4p – 1 – 4s/4p – 1 – FINISH

== Weather conditions ==
In the leadup to the Olympics many questioned the choice of Qingdao as a venue with very little predicted wind. During the races the wind was pretty light and quite unpredictable. Due to lack of wind (< 1.6 knots) one racing day had to be cancelled and the medal race needed to be postponed to the next day.

== Final results ==
Results of individual races
Pos	Helmsman	Country	I	II	III	IV	V	VI	VII	VIII	MR	Tot	Pts
Gold medal	Ben Ainslie	Great Britain	10^{†}	1	4	1	1	10	2	2	1	33.0	23.0
Silver medal	Zach Railey	United States	2	5	2	2	7	8	7	19^{†}	6	64.0	45.0
Bronze medal	Guillaume Florent	France	5	8	20	3	4	6	4	21^{†}	4	79.0	58.0
4	Daniel Birgmark	Sweden	14	17^{†}	1	6	12	3	3	5	7	75.0	58.0
5	Christopher Cook	Canada	8	3	7	10	23^{†}	5	15	3	8	90.0	67.0
6	Jonas Høgh-Christensen	Denmark	16	6	12	16	25^{†}	4	5	7	2	95.0	70.0
7	Gašper Vinčec	Slovenia	9	11	6	5	3	13^{†}	8	10	10	85.0	72.0
8	Ivan Kljaković Gašpić	Croatia	7	10	10	8	16^{†}	9	1	13	9	92.0	76.0
9	Rafael Trujillo	Spain	12	4	3	14	20	20	OCS 27^{†}	1	3	107.0	80.0
10	Rafał Szukiel	Poland	3	2	19	12	10	14	22^{†}	12	5	104.0	82.0
11	Giorgio Poggi	Italy	17	7	14	21^{†}	6	12	9	9		95.0	74.0
12	Dan Slater	New Zealand	21^{†}	19	18	4	9	7	13	6		97.0	76.0
13	Eduardo Couto	Brazil	6	16	DNF 27^{†}	7	2	17	14	OCS 27		116.0	89.0
14	Pieter-Jan Postma	Netherlands	19	15	16	22^{†}	15	2	10	16		115.0	93.0
15	Aimilios Papathanasiou	Greece	1	DNF 27^{†}	5	DNE 27	18	15	DNE 27	8		128.0	101.0
16	Anthony Nossiter	Australia	11	22^{†}	8	17	13	21	11	20		123.0	101.0
17	Eduard Skornyakov	Russia	24^{†}	20	17	13	8	18	12	14		126.0	102.0
18	Tapio Nirkko	Finland	18	9	9	9	19	22^{†}	16	22		124.0	102.0
19	Peer Moberg	Norway	23	DSQ 27^{†}	11	19	22	1	DSQ 27	4		134.0	107.0
20	Ali Kemal Tüfekçi	Turkey	20	21^{†}	13	18	14	19	6	17		128.0	107.0
21	Tim Goodbody	Ireland	22^{†}	13	15	15	17	16	21	15		134.0	112.0
22	Haris Papadopoulos	Cyprus	13	18	21	11	24	11	17	OCS 27^{†}		142.0	115.0
23	Nachhatar Singh Johal	India	4	24^{†}	23	24	11	24	18	24		152.0	128.0
24	Zhang Peng	China	25	23	24	20	5	26^{†}	23	11		157.0	131.0
25	Michael Maier	Czech Republic	15	14	22	25^{†}	21	23	19	23		162.0	137.0
26	Jhonny Senen Bilbao Bande	Venezuela	26^{†}	12	25	23	26	25	20	18		175.0	149.0

Scoring system: low-point system;
Legend: – Qualified for medal race(s); BFD – Black flag disqualification; DNE – Non excludable disqualification; DNF – Did not finish; DPI – Discretionary penalty imposed; OCS – On the course side of the starting line; † – Discarded race not counted in the overall result;

== Daily standings ==
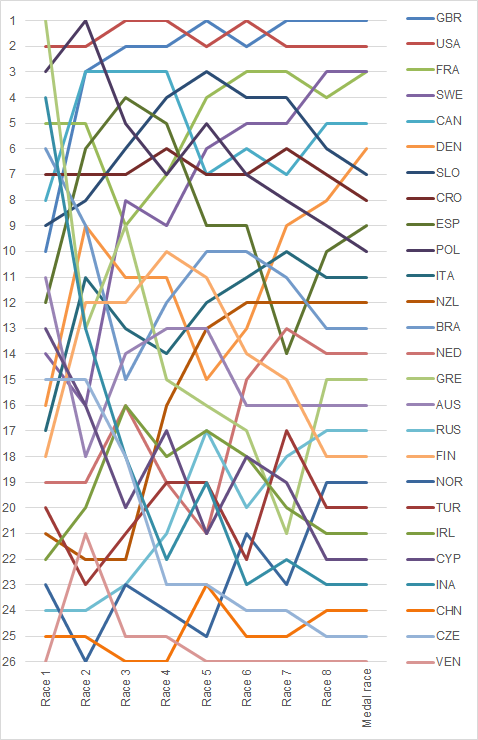
Graph showing the daily standings in the Finn during the 2008 Summer Olympics
