= 2013 Finn Gold Cup =

International sailing competition held in Tallinn

Event title
- Edition: 58th
- Host: Kalev Yacht Club

Event details
- Venue: Tallinn, Estonia
- Dates: 23–31 August
- Yachts: Finn
- Titles: 1

Results
- (gold) Gold: (Brazil) Jorge Zarif
- (silver) Silver: (United Kingdom) Edward Wright
- (bronze) Bronze: (Netherlands) Pieter-Jan Postma

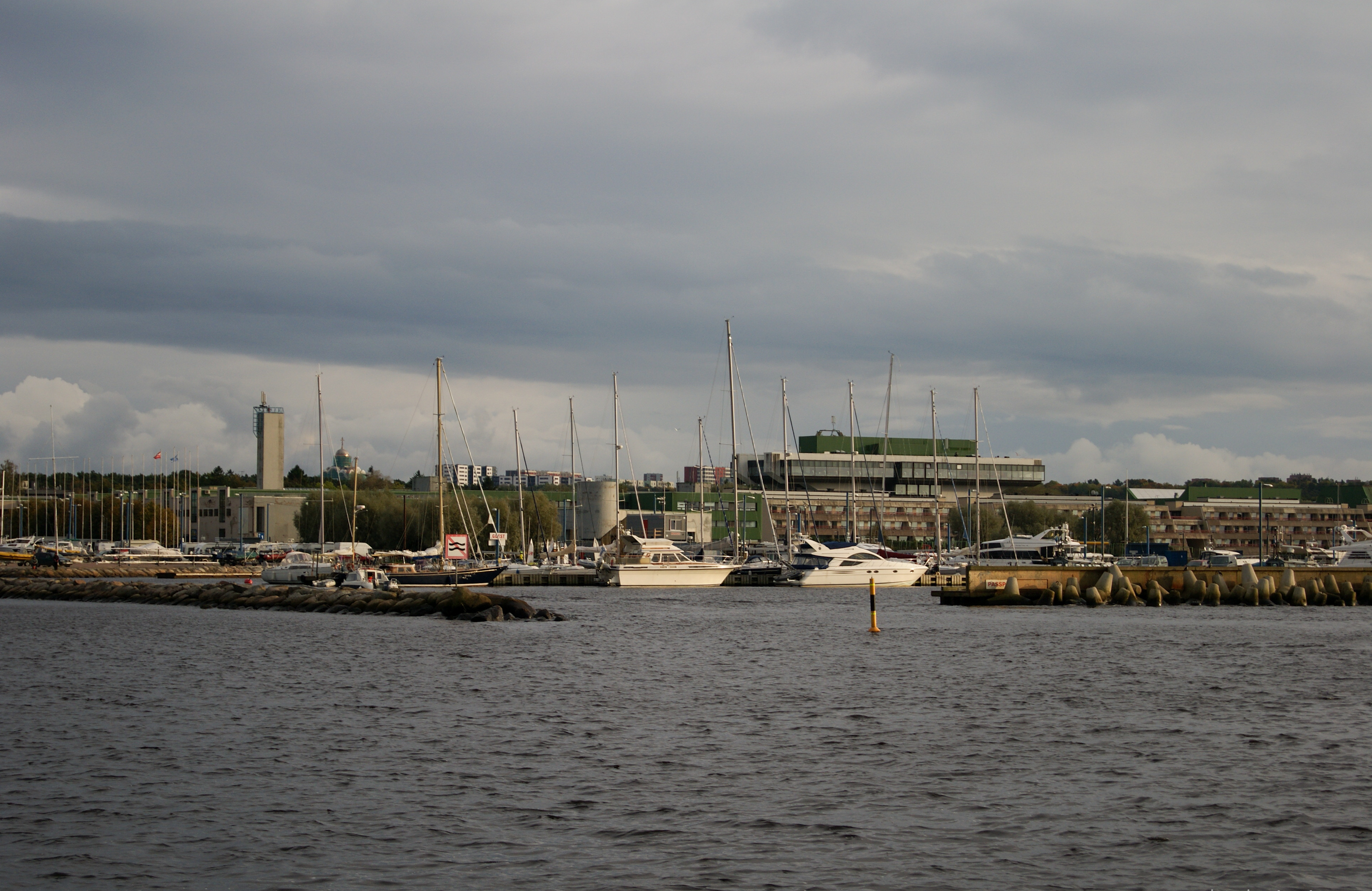
Pirita harbour

The 2013 Finn Gold Cup, and the official Finn World Championships, was held on Tallinn Bay, Estonia, between 23 and 31 August 2013. The hosting yacht club was Kalev Yacht Club located in Pirita.

== Medalists ==
Rank	Sailor
Gold medal	Jorge Zarif (BRA)
Silver medal	Edward Wright (GBR)
Bronze medal	Pieter-Jan Postma (NED)
