= Purjetaja =

Estonian newspaper

- Owner(s): Estonian Yachting Union (EYU), (Eesti Jahtklubide Liit)
- Editor-in-chief: Leonid Parašin, Peeter Leola
- Language: Estonian
- ISSN: 1406-0043
- Website: https://puri.ee/

Purjetaja was 1989–1995 a newspaper published in Estonia.
