= Pieter-Jan Postma =

Dutch sailor (born 1982)

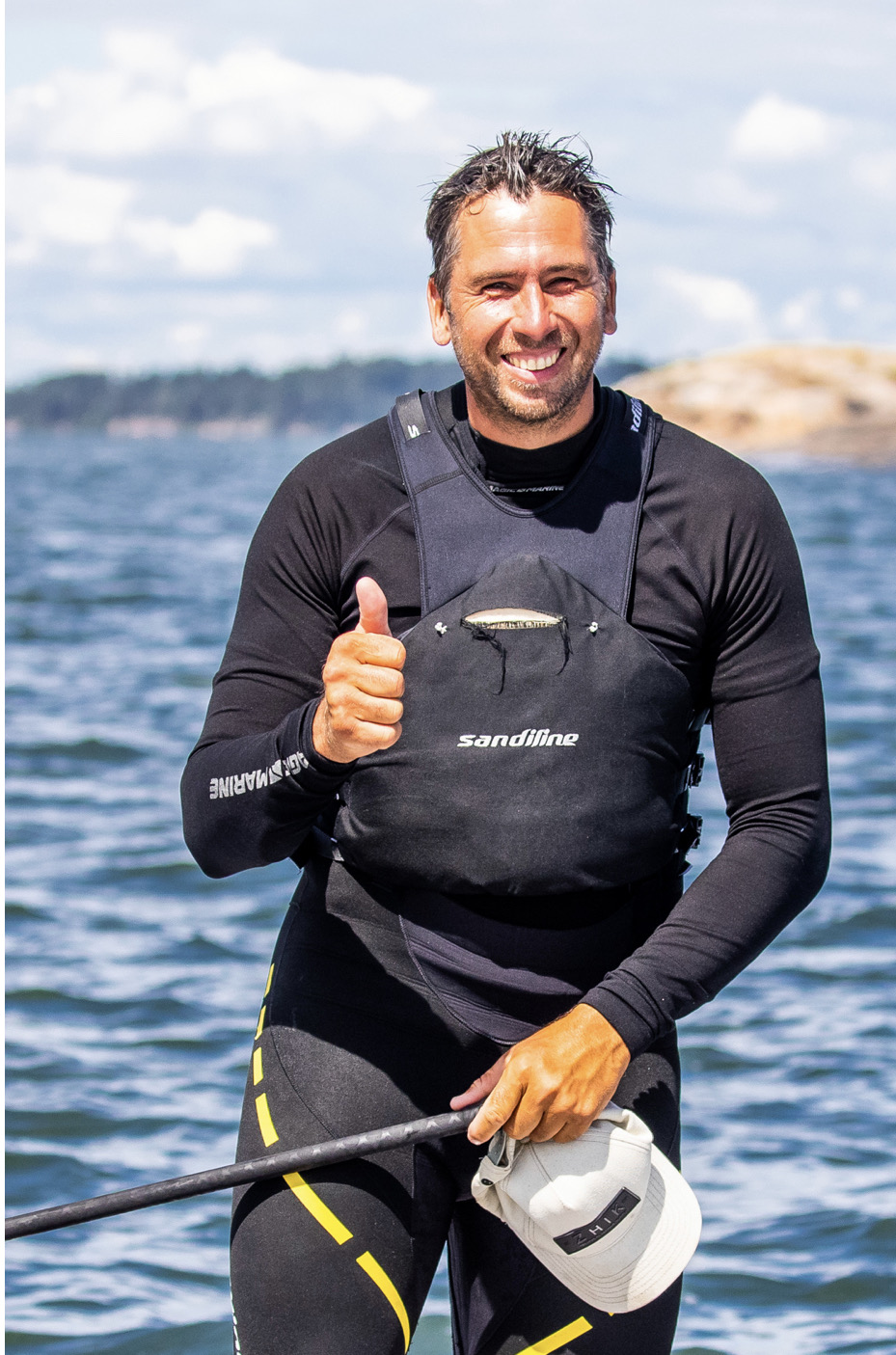
- Photographer: Robert Deaves

Personal information
- Nationality: Dutch
- Born: 10 January 1982 (age 44) Heerenveen
- Height: 1.89 m (6 ft 2 in)
- Weight: 101 kg (223 lb)

Sailing career
- Sport: Sailing
- Club: Koninklijke Watersportvereniging Sneek
- Class(es): Laser Radial; Laser; Finn

Achievements and titles
- Olympic finals: 2008, 2012, 2016
Competition record
Pre-Olympics: silver (2007 en 2015) and bronze (2011)
WK: gold (2022 en 2022), silver (2000, 2007 en 2011), bronze (2013, 2016, 2018 en 2019)
EK: gold (2016)
Coaching 69F: Goldcup gold (2021 en 2022)
Coaching Finn-klasse: Gold Athens Week for Zombor Berecz (2019) en silver at Springcup Alican Kaynar (2020)
- Updated on 10th of January 2023

Pieter-Jan Postma (born 10 January 1982 in Heerenveen) is a sailor from the Netherlands and Olympic coach. He represented the Netherlands three times at the Olympic Games and is a multiple National, European and World Champion.

Postma starts sailing in an Optimist when he is seven years old. He graduated as a Maritime Officer and Technical Business Administration before participating in the 2008 Olympic Games in Beijing. During these games, Pieter-Jan Postma is 26 and takes fourteenth place. During the Olympic Games in London he reached the fourth place. He also participates in the Olympic Games in Rio de Janeiro and reaches the tenth place.

He is a member of the Royal Water Sports Association Sneek.

== Personal life ==
Postma spent the first seventeen years of his life in Terkaple, a tiny village in Friesland. He has a sister who is four years older and a sister who is two years younger. As a child, he spent a lot of time playing different sports: football, tennis, speed skating, and sailing. After secondary school, Postma started a study for Naval Officer on Terschelling in 2000, which he completed in 2005. From then on Postma focuses entirely on his sailing career. In 2010 he takes a break from sailing and completes his studies in Industrial Engineering and Management in Leeuwarden. Postma currently lives in Friesland.

== Sailing career ==
=== Highlights ===
Position	Event	Class
Olympic Games
10	2016	Sailing at the 2016 Summer Olympics - Finn
4	2012	Sailing at the 2012 Summer Olympics - Finn
14	2008	Sailing at the 2008 Summer Olympics - Finn
World Championships
Gold medal	2025	Finn Masters World Championship
Gold medal	2022	Finn Masters World Championship
9	2019	M32 World Championship
Gold medal	2022	Finn World Championships
Bronze medal	2018	Finn World Championships
Bronze medal	2016	Finn World Championships
6	2015	Finn World Championships
26	2014	Finn World Championships
Bronze medal	2013	Finn World Championships
9	2012	Finn World Championships
Silver medal	2011	Finn World Championships
20	2010	Finn World Championships
12	2009	Finn World Championships
4	2008	Finn World Championships
Silver medal	2007	Finn World Championships
12	2006	Finn World Championships
28	2005	Finn World Championships
13	2004	Laser World Championships
39	2003	Laser World Championships
22	2003	Laser World Championships
58	2001	Laser World Championships
10	2000	30th Volvo Youth Sailing ISAF World Championships - ILCA 7 Men
Silver medal	2000	Splash World Championship

=== Early sailing career ===
At the age of thirteen, Postma participates in his first European Championship Optimist and at the age of fifteen he sailed at the World Championship in Dublin. In 1998, at the age of sixteen, Postma switched to the Laser and, just like in 1999 and 2000, again sails at the World Cup. In 2000 he participates in the ISAF World Championship in Sydney. He reaches 10th place. After returning from his internship at sea, Postma started preparing for the 2004 Olympic Games in Athens. Postma wins the national selection, but misses the Olympic qualification. In 2004 he became Dutch Laser champion for the first time.

=== Adult sailing career ===
In 2005 he made the switch to the Finn class. He qualified three times for the Olympic Games (2008, 2012 and 2016) and achieved good results during the Pre-Olympics: he won silver twice (2007 and 2015) and bronze once (2011). However, Postma did not manage to gain a medal; in 2016 he lost his golden medal at the last buoy and eventually finished fourth. He also returns home without a medal at the other Olympic Games.

Postma does win many titles at World Cups, European Championships, National Championships and World Cups. In 2000, 2007 and 2011 he won silver at the World Cup, in 2013, 2016, 2018 and 2019 bronze at the World Cup. In 2022 he won gold twice at the World Cup and at the European Championship in 2016 he won the gold medal. In addition, Postma became Dutch Champion eleven times and won a World Cup six times.

Postma's sailing career is characterized by continuous development and innovation. This ultimately brings him the gold medal at the 2022 World Cup. It also gives him a strong foundation for being a coach after his sailing career in the Finn class.

== Coaching ==
Since 2019, Postma has been working as a coach in the sailing world. In 2020 and 2021 he was coach of the Dutch Sail team that sails in the 69F. With the 69F, the team led by Postma wins the Gold Cup in 2020 and 2021. Next to these medals the team wins eight other events. In 2019 he coached the Hungarian Zsombor Berecz, who qualified for the Olympic Games (Finn class) under the leadership of Postma and won bronze at the World Cup. Postma also coached the Turkish yacht racer Alican Kaynar who wins the Olympic Games (Finn class).

== Sailing projects ==
In 2016, Postma founded Sailing Team NL with the aim of stimulating more cooperation in the Dutch sailing world. He uses his experiences as a professional sailor. As part of this project, he purchased two M32s in 2017 and competed worldwide with a match-race team. In 2018, as race director and manager, he organized several events around this project, many of which were located in Valencia. With the M32 the European series were won in 2018, in 2019 the round of Texel was won.

In 2020, Postma continues these collaborative projects. He invites Sailing Holland, Dutch Sail and the water sports association to work together on Youth America's Cup. This project is growing into a project in which the 69F is sailed.
