= Georgios Kontogouris =

Greek sailor

Personal information
- Nationality: Greek
- Born: 8 July 1980 (age 45)

Sport
- Sport: Sailing

Georgios Kontogouris (born 8 July 1980) is a Greek sailor. He competed in the Star event at the 2004 Summer Olympics.
