= Max Salminen =

Swedish sailor

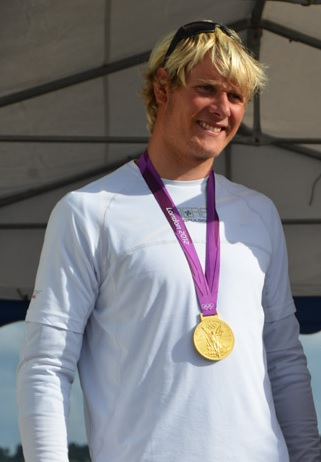
- Salminen in 2012

Personal information
- Born: 22 September 1988 (age 37) Lund, Sweden
- Height: 197 cm (6 ft 6 in)
- Weight: 98 kg (216 lb)

Sailing career
- Sport: Sailing
- Club: Royal Gothenburg Yacht Club; Royal Swedish Yacht Club
- Classes: Finn; Laser; Star
Medal record
Sailing
Representing Sweden
Olympic Games
Gold medal – first place	2012 London	Star class
World Championships
Gold medal – first place	2017 Balatonföldvár	Finn class

Max Salminen (born 22 September 1988) is a Swedish competitive sailor and the 2012 Olympic champion in the Star class together with Fredrik Lööf.

== Biography ==
Salminen was born in Lund, Sweden, on 22 September 1988, and started sailing in Segelsällskapet Pinhättan in Barsebäckshamn. For upper secondary school, he attended Katedralskolan in Lund. In 2010, Salminen joined Fredrik Lööf for an Olympic campaign in the Star class. Before the 2012 Summer Olympics, he relocated to Lake Garda in Italy to practice with Lööf. At the time, Salminen represented the Royal Swedish Yacht Club.

The duo competed at the 2012 Summer Olympics in London, winning the Star event. The Swedish duo had secured a medal before the medal race but were sitting twelve points, or six places in the double-scoring race, behind Iain Percy and Andrew Simpson of Great Britain, but by winning the race while Great Britain only finished eighth after having lost their fifth place in the race over the last leg.

After the 2012 Summer Olympics, the Star left the Olympic programme, Lööf engaged in Artemis Racing and the America's Cup, and Salminen switched to the Finn dinghy. Representing the Royal Gothenburg Yacht Club, he was selected to represent Sweden in the men's Finn event at the Rio Olympics, where he finished in sixth place. Salminen then won the 2017 Finn Gold Cup in Balatonföldvár, Hungary, and was crowned World champion ahead of Jonathan Lobert of France och Nicholas Heiner of the Netherlands.

He qualified to represent Sweden at the 2020 Summer Olympics in the men's Finn. Salminen was chosen as the Swedish flag bearer at the opening ceremony together with equestrian Sara Algotsson Ostholt. Salminen finished ninth in the event which marked the end of the Olympic career for the Finn dinghy.

== Achievements ==
As of 27 September 2015

Year	Competition	Venue	Position	Event
2009	Laser World Championships	Halifax, Canada	81st	Laser class
2011	ISAF Sailing World Championships	Perth, Australia	5th	Star class
2012	Star World Championship	Hyères, France	5th	Star class
2012	Olympic Games	Weymouth and Portland, UK	1st	Star class
2013	Finn Gold Cup	Tallinn, Estonia	44th	Finn class
2014	ISAF Sailing World Championships	Santander, Spain	10th	Finn class

Olympic Games
Preceded by Therese Alshammar	Flagbearer for Sweden (with Sara Algotsson Ostholt); Tokyo 2020	Succeeded by Incumbent
