= Ahmad Ahmadi (sailor) =

Iranian sailor

Ahmad Ahmadi (Persian: احمداحمدی) (born 11 September 1990 in Isfahan) is an Iranian professional sailor which competed in the 2014 Asian Games, three Olympic qualifiers for London 2012, and the 2016 Olympic Games. His which his best result was finishing 9th in 2015 Qingdao World Cup in finals. He currently on his third Olympic campaign toward Tokyo 2020 Olympics.
