= Besetment =

- Directed by: Brad Douglas
- Written by: Brad Douglas
- Produced by: Brad Douglas
- Starring: Abby Wathen; Marlyn Mason; Michael Meyer
- Cinematography: Chuck Greenwood
- Edited by: Greg James
- Music by: Graham Denman; Kyle Hnedak
- Production company: Barbed Wire Films
- Distributed by: Uncork'd Entertainment
- Release date: 6 June 2017
- Running time: 76 minutes
- Country: United States
- Language: English

Besetment is a 2017 American horror thriller film written and directed by Brad Douglas, starring Abby Wathen, Marlyn Mason and Michael Meyer.

== Cast ==
- Abby Wathen as Amanda Millard
- Marlyn Mason as Mildred Colvin
- Michael Meyer as Billy Colvin
- Max Gutfreund as Brad
- Sonya Davis as Brittany
- Greg James as Sheriff Joe Palin
- Hannah Barefoot as Deputy Julie Nelson
- Lindsae Klein as Amanda's Mother
- Douglas Rowe as Pastor Ben Hastings
- John T. Woods as Mark
- Liam O'Sruitheain as Doctor Hanson
- Sandra Doolittle as Amanda's Attorney
- Tanner McCullough as Billy's Attorney
- Ashley Layton as Court Clerk
- Nona Bingham as Organist
- Ed Simper as Grocery Store Clerk

== Release ==
The film was released to DVD on 5 September 2017.

== Reception ==
Phil Wheat of Nerdly rated the film 5 stars out of 5 and praised the "captivating" and "original" score, as well as Mason's "tour-de-force performance". Wheat also stated that Wathen "manages to hold her own throughout the film". Michael DeFellipo of Horror Society gave the film a score of 7/10 and wrote that it "explores elements not typically covered in the media – like the sex lives of older people – while also discussing the true horrors of the world we live in; namely the fact that we work and work until we die." Matt Boiselle of Dread Central rated the film 3.5 stars out of 5 and wrote that while there are a "few sluggish moments in pacing", the "overall tempo is a fluid one, and it aids in the story’s progression – Douglas is obviously someone who knows how to keep a film moving along and not beating his audience with the boredom stick in order to convey his directive." Boiselle also praised performances.

Lacy Lou of PopHorror wrote that while Mason "killed it in her role" and the film "had so much potential", it is "not original and very predictable" and the rest of the performances "felt lackluster and the actors did not seem really committed to their roles." Rich Cross of Starburst wrote that "key characters make unconvincing decisions before a last-minute “twist” robs the movie of any vestige of internal logic" and that the film "never once risked deviating from the derivative." Cross also praised the performances of Wathen and Mason while calling the rest of the cast "lacklustre".
