= Nachhatar Singh Johal =

Indian sailor (born 1979)

Personal information
- National team: India
- Born: 1979 (age 46–47) Jalandar, India

Sport
- Sport: Sailboat Racing

Nachhatar Singh Johal (born 1979) is an Indian sailor. He was born in Jalandhar, Punjab. He competed at the 2008 Summer Olympics in Beijing, where he placed 23rd in the Finn class.
