= Giles Scott =

British sailor

Giles Scott MBE
Personal information
- Full name: Giles Lyndon Scott
- Nationality: Great Britain
- Born: 23 June 1987 (age 39) Huntingdon, Cambridgeshire, England, UK

Sailing career
- Sport: Sailing
- Class: Finn
Medal record
Representing Great Britain
Event	1st	2nd	3rd
Olympic Games	2	0	0
World championships	6	0	2
European Championships	3	2	0
Total	11	2	2
Sailing
Olympic Games
Gold medal – first place	2016 Rio de Janeiro	Finn
Gold medal – first place	2020 Tokyo	Finn
World Championships
Gold medal – first place	2005	Laser
Gold medal – first place	2008	Youth Finn
Gold medal – first place	2011 Perth	Finn
Gold medal – first place	2014 Santander	Finn
Gold medal – first place	2015 Takapuna	Finn
Gold medal – first place	2016 Gaeta	Finn
Bronze medal – third place	2002 Buffalo	Laser Radial
Bronze medal – third place	2010 San Francisco	Finn
European Championships
Gold medal – first place	2011 Helsinki	Finn
Gold medal – first place	2014 La Rochelle	Finn
Gold medal – first place	2019 Athens	Finn
Silver medal – second place	2020 Gdynia	Finn
Silver medal – second place	2021 Vilamoura	Finn

Giles Lyndon Scott (born 23 June 1987) is a British professional sailor a two time Olympic gold medallist and multiple world champion. And is presently skipper on the Sail GP series.

== Early life and education ==
Scott was born in Huntingdon, Cambridgeshire, to John and Rosalind Scott. His father was a sports administrator and latterly director of the U.K. Anti Doping Agency and Chief Executive of the 2014 Commonwealth Games. His mother was a special education teacher. Aged 1, he moved to Canada in 1988 where his father worked for the Federal Minister for Amateur Sport. It was in Canada that he had his first sailing experience in dinghies on the Ottawa River. He returned aged 6 in 1993 and was re-introduced to sailing at the inland reservoir at Grafham Water, Cambridgeshire where his parents encouraged him to take up junior competitive sailing. He was educated at Sharnbrook Upper School in Bedfordshire and the University of Southampton where he graduated with a BSc in Geography.

== Titles ==
=== Olympic titles ===
- (gold) 2016 Olympic Games
- (gold) 2020 Olympic Games

Scott was training partner for Ben Ainslie before going on to win the gold medal for Team GB in the Finn Class at the 2016 Summer Olympics in Rio de Janeiro where having dominated the class, Scott secured his place in the history books winning the gold medal with a day to spare.

=== World Championships titles ===
- (bronze) 2002 Youth ILCA 6 World Championships
- (gold) 2005 ISAF Youth Sailing World Championships - Laser
- 20th 2005 ILCA 7 World Championship
- 7th 2006 ILCA 7 World Championship
- 14th 2007 Finn Youth World Championship
- (gold) 2008 Finn Youth World Championship
- 4th 2009 Finn World Championship
- (bronze) 2010 Finn World Championship
- (gold) 2011 Finn World Championship
- (gold) 2014 Finn World Championship
- (gold) 2015 Finn World Championship
- (gold) 2016 Finn World Championship
- 4th 2019 Finn World Championship
- 9th 2021 Finn World Championship
- 18th 2025 Moth World Championship

=== European Championships titles ===
- 1st 2011 Finn European Championships
- 1st 2014 Finn European Championships
- 1st 2019 Finn European Championships

=== America Cup & SailGP ===
In January 2024, Scott took over the driver role of the Great Britain SailGP team from Ben Ainslie. He secured his first SailGP event win in Halifax, Canada, in June 2024, winning the inaugural Rockwool Canada Sail Grand Prix. Scott was head of sailing for Ainslie's British America's Cup Team, INEOS Britannia, competing in the 37th America's Cup in Barcelona.

In September 2024, Scott was announced as driver for Canada's NorthStar SailGP Team.
