= Greg Douglas (sailor) =

Canadian sailor (born 1990)

Gregory Douglas (born 25 June 1990, St. Michael, Barbados) is a Canadian sailor. He competed at the 2012 Summer Olympics in the Men's Finn class. Previously, he represented his native Barbados at the 2008 Olympics. He attended Lakefield College School in Canada.

His younger sister Sarah is also a sailor, and has represented Canada at the Tokyo 2020 and Paris 2024 Olympics.
