= Michal Maier =

Czech sailor

Michal Maier (born May 7, 1964) is a Czech sailor. He competed at five consecutive Summer Olympics in the Finn class: 1996 (14th position) 2000 (19th), 2004 (15th), 2008 (25th) and 2012 (21st).

Maier was the oldest among Czech participants at the 2012 Olympics, with an age of 48 years and 88 days at time of his closing race.
