= Vasilij Žbogar =

Slovenian sailor (born 1975)

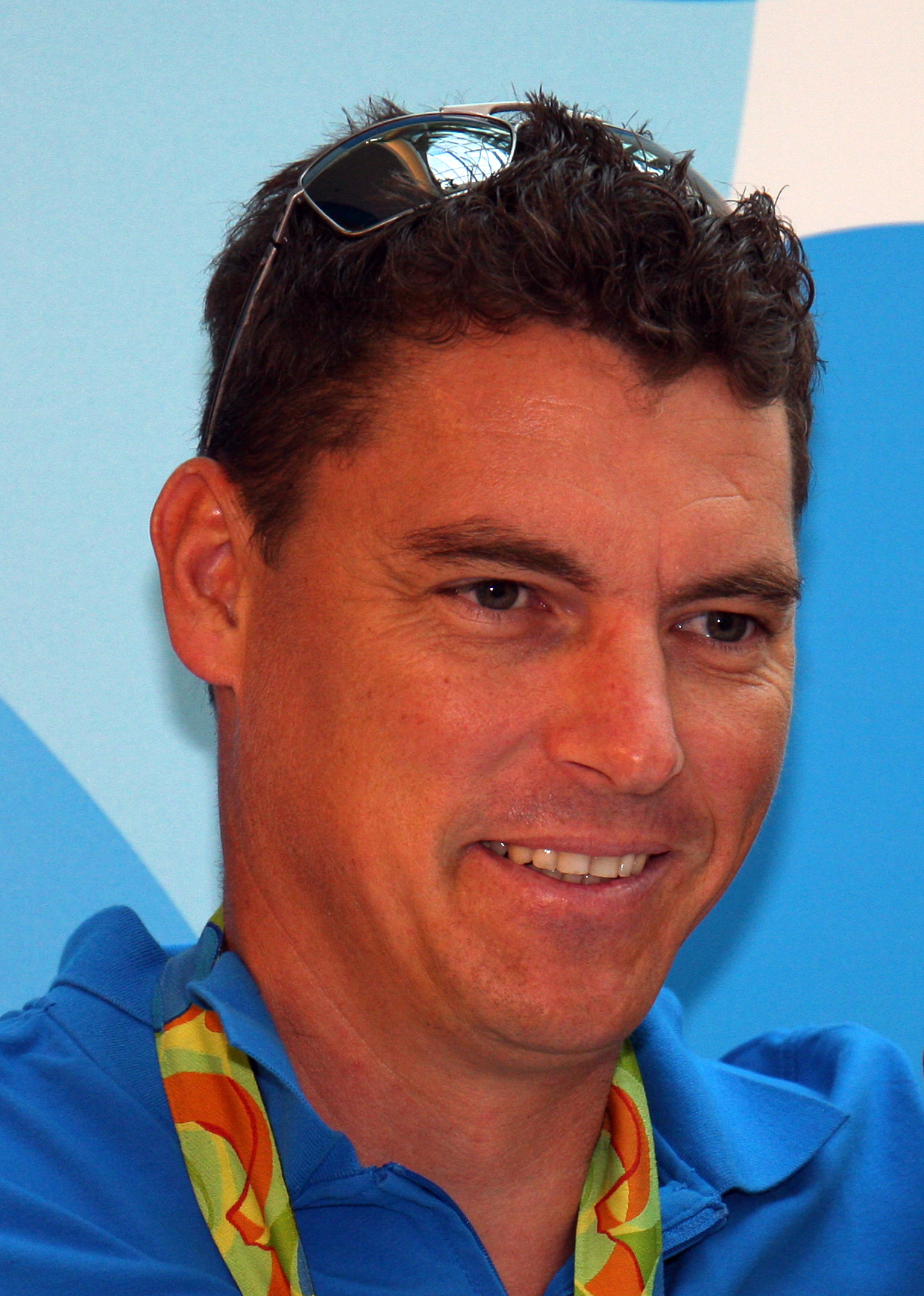

Personal information
- Nationality: Slovenia
- Born: 4 October 1975 (age 50) Koper, SR Slovenia, SFR Yugoslavia

Sailing career
- Sport: Sailing
- Class(es): Laser, Finn
Medal record
Representing Slovenia
Event	1st	2nd	3rd
Olympic Games	0	2	1
Total	0	2	1
Sailing
Olympic Games
Silver medal – second place	2008 Beijing	Laser
Silver medal – second place	2016 Rio de Janeiro	Finn
Bronze medal – third place	2004 Athens	Laser
World Championships
Silver medal – second place	2005 Fortaleza	Laser
World Championships
Bronze medal – third place	2015 Takapuna	Finn
European Championships
Gold medal – first place	2013 Scarlino	Finn
Silver medal – second place	2012 Warnemünde	Finn
Silver medal – second place	2014 La Rochelle	Finn
Bronze medal – third place	2015 Split	Finn
Mediterranean Games
Gold medal – first place	2005 Almería	Laser

Vasilij Žbogar (born 4 October 1975), is a Slovenian sailor. He was born in Koper.

Žbogar competed in the 2004 Summer Olympics, where he won a bronze medal and in the 2008 Summer Olympics, where he won a silver medal, both of them in laser class. In 2010, he competed in the Barcolana regatta as a member of the record-setting yacht Esimit Europa 2, winning the event. In 2016, he competed in 2016 Summer Olympics and won a silver medal in Finn class.

Žbogar was named Slovenian Sportsman of the year in 2004.

Olympic Games
Preceded by Peter Kauzer	Flagbearer for Slovenia; Rio de Janeiro 2016	Succeeded by Eva Terčelj and Bojan Tokić
