= Zach Railey =

American sailor (born 1984)

Personal information
- Born: May 9, 1984 (age 42) St. Petersburg, Florida, U.S.
Medal record
Sailing
Representing United States
Olympic Games
Silver medal – second place	2008 Beijing	Finn

Zach Railey (born May 9, 1984) is an American sailor and Olympic athlete. Zach won a silver medal in sailing at the 2008 Summer Olympics and competed in the 2012 Summer Olympics in London. He was born in St. Petersburg, Florida.
