= Giorgio Poggi =

Italian sailor (born 1981)

Personal information
- Nationality: Italy
- Born: 26 August 1981 (age 44) Albenga, Italy
- Height: 1.85 m (6 ft 1 in)
- Weight: 90 kg (198 lb)

Sailing career
- Sport: Sailing
- Club: G.S. Fiamme Gialle
- Coached by: Valentin Mankin (personal); Michele Marchesini (national)
- Class: Dinghy

Giorgio Poggi (born 26 August 1981 in Albenga) is an Italian sailor who specializes in the Finn class. He has been selected to compete for the Italian sailing team at the 2008 Summer Olympics, and has come close to an Olympic medal race in the Finn fleet (finishing in eleventh place). Currently, Poggi is ranked nineteenth in the world for his respective sailing class by ISAF, following some of his successes at the Finn Gold Cup, World Championships, and the World Cup series.

== Biography ==
Poggi started sailing at the age of twelve and then first competed as an Optimist and Laser specialist. In 2006, he gained weight and decided to move to the heavier Finn class. Throughout his pre-Olympic career, Poggi had produced a total of six gold medals in different sailing classes at the Italian national championships (from 2002 to 2008). While competing in the sport, Poggi worked as a member of the police force and sailing fleet for Gruppi Sportivi Fiamme Gialle, under the tutelage of his well-accomplished coaches: 2004 Olympian Michele Marchesini and three-time Olympic champion Valentin Mankin of the former Soviet Union.

Leading up to his Olympic debut, Poggi managed to get 169 points to place nineteenth and assure one of the six available Olympic berths at the ISAF Finn Gold Cup in Melbourne, Australia. At the 2008 Beijing Olympics, Poggi sailed a marvelous stretch to record a net grade of 74 after eight races in the Finn class, but missed out a chance to compete for the Olympic medal by just eight notches behind Spain's Rafael Trujillo, finishing in eleventh overall.
