= Filippo Baldassari =

Italian sailor

Filippo Baldassari (born 22 July 1988, Chiaravalle, Ancona) is an Italian sailor. He competed at the 2012 Summer Olympics in the Men's Finn class.
