= Edward Wright (sailor) =

British sailor

Ed Wright
Personal information
- Full name: Edward Wright
- Nationality: British
- Born: 13 October 1977 (age 48) Nottingham, England

Sailing career
- Sport: Sailing
- Class: Finn
Medal record
Sailing
Representing Great Britain
World Championships
Gold medal – first place	2023 Porto Cervo	5.5m
Gold medal – first place	2010 San Francisco	Finn
Gold medal – first place	2023 Coconut Grove	Finn
Silver medal – second place	2012 Falmouth	Finn
Silver medal – second place	2013 Tallinn	Finn
Bronze medal – third place	2006 Split	Finn
Bronze medal – third place	2011 Perth	Finn
Bronze medal – third place	2014 Santander	Finn

Edward Wright (born 13 October 1977) is a professional sailor from Great Britain and who was nominated for the 2010 ISAF World Sailor of Year Awards.

Career Results Highlights

- 3rd – 2014 ISAF Sailing World Championships in the Finn
- 2nd – 2013 Finn World Championship
- 2nd – 2012 Finn World Championship
- 3rd – 2011 ISAF Sailing World Championships in the Finn
- 1st – 2010 Finn World Championship
- 3rd – 2006 Finn World Championship
- 6th – 2002 Laser World Championship
