= Royal Yachting Association =

Yachting governing body in the United Kingdom

Royal Yachting Association RYA
- IOC nation: Great Britain & Northern Ireland (GBR)
- Sport: Sailing
- Other sports: Personal watercraft
- Official website: www.rya.org.uk

History
- Year of formation: 1875
- Former names: Yacht Racing Association

Affiliations
- International federation: World Sailing (World Sailing)
- World Sailing members page: www.sailing.org
- World Sailing member since: 1907 Founding Member
- Continental association: European Sailing Federation
- National Olympic Committee: British Olympic Committee
- National Paralympic Committee: British Paralympic Committee
- Other affiliation(s): European Boating Association

Elected
- President: The Princess Royal
- Board: Chris Preston (Chair)

Secretariat
- Address: RYA House; Ensign Way; Hamble le Rice; Southampton
- Country: UK
- Chief Executive: Sara Sutcliffe MBE
- Number of staff: Approx. 160

Finance
- Company status: Limited Company

Regions
- Scotland; Northern Ireland; Cymru Wales; North West; North East; Midlands; East; London & South East; South; South West

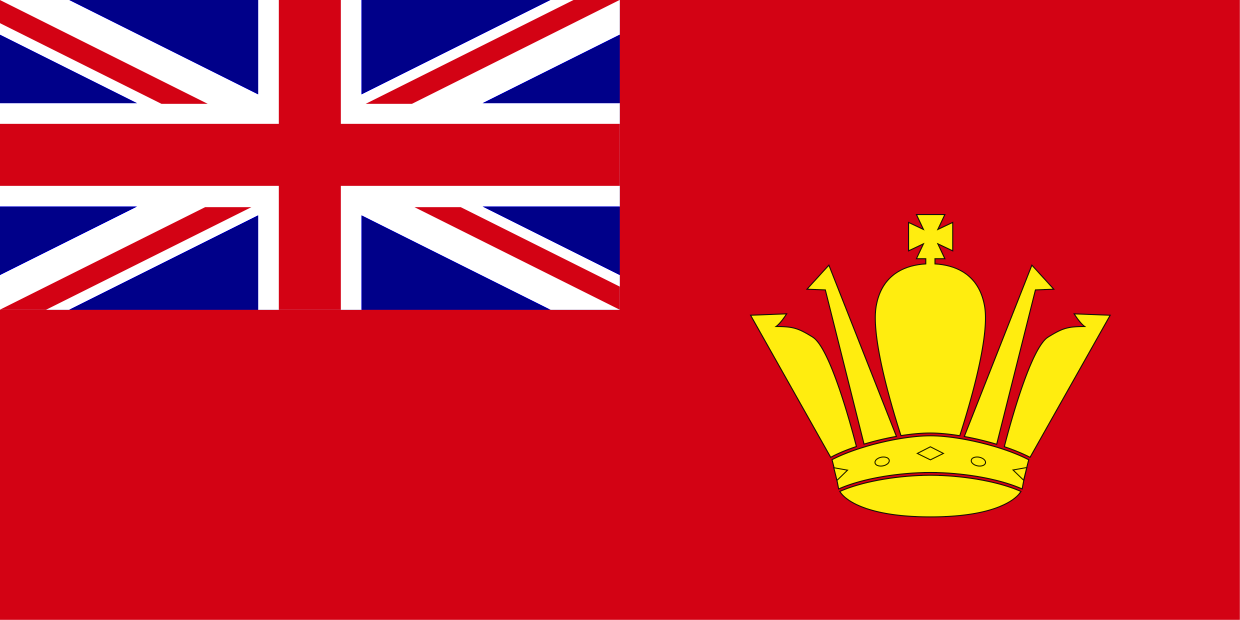
RYA ensign

The Royal Yachting Association (RYA) is a United Kingdom national governing body for sailing, dinghy sailing, yacht and motor cruising, sail racing, RIBs and sportsboats, windsurfing and personal watercraft and a leading representative for inland waterways cruising.

== History ==
The Yacht Racing Association was founded in November 1875. Its initial purpose was to standardize the rules of measurement to different racing yachts so that boats of different classes could compete fairly against each other. Membership at the time cost two guineas and was available to "former and present owners of racing yachts of and above 10 tons Thames measurement and such other gentlemen as the committee may elect".

In 1921 the YRA incorporated the independent Sailing Boat Association and the Boat Racing Association into its body. In 1952 the YRA became the Royal Yachting Association (RYA).

The RYA remains constituted as a membership association, with a Council of elected volunteers as its supreme policy-making body. It publishes over 110 maritime titles that are regarded internationally and is translated into more than 20 foreign languages. RYA Magazine is the organisation's membership magazine.

== British Sailing Team ==
The RYA manages the British Sailing Team (BST), from which Team GB's Olympic sailing team is selected. Training and infrastructure is provided by the RYA, while central funding is through bodies such as The National Lottery. The British Sailing team is the most successful Olympic sailing team in the world, and sailing is the only sport in which Great Britain leads the Olympic medal table.

== Committees ==
While the RYA Council is the RYA's senior policy-making body in boating matters, responsibility for the Association's different activities and areas of interest is delegated to a number of policy committees.

The main function of the policy committees and sub-committees is to agree and oversee the implementation of RYA policy in their respective areas. Responsibility for day-to-day management of each area rests with the RYA's professional staff, with the relevant departmental manager acting as secretary to their committee.

== Powerboat racing ==
The RYA announced in August 2018 that they would no longer act as the national authority for powerboat racing in the United Kingdom.

Financial, safety, and reputational challenges were the reasons given for the decision alongside the fact that the Powerboat Racing office had only issued 92 adult and 18 junior licences in 2018.

== See also ==
- Watersports
- Yachting
- Yacht club
- Association
- British Isles
- Sport in the United Kingdom
- International Council of Yacht Clubs
- British Marine Federation
