= Sailing Federation of Ukraine =

Sports governing body in Ukraine

- IOC nation: Ukraine (UKR)
- Sport: Sailing
- Official website: www.sfu.com.ua

HISTORY
- Year of formation: 19??

DEMOGRAPHICS
- Number of Sailing clubs: ?

AFFILIATIONS
- International federation: International Sailing Federation (ISAF)
- Continental association: EUROSAF
- National Olympic Committee: National Olympic Committee of Ukraine

ELECTED
- President: Vasyl Gureyev

SECRETARIAT
- Secretary General: Anton Solomko

FINANCE
- Company status: Association

The Sailing Federation of Ukraine is the national governing body for the sport of sailing in Ukraine, recognised by the International Sailing Federation.

== Notable sailors ==
See Category:Ukrainian sailors

=== Olympic sailors ===
See Category:Olympic sailors of Ukraine

=== Offshore sailors ===
See Category:Ukrainian sailors (sport)
