= Estonian Yachting Union =

Sports governing body in Estonia

Estonian Sailing Union EYU
- IOC nation: Estonia (EST)
- Sport: Sailing
- Official website: www.puri.ee

HISTORY
- Year of formation: 1928

DEMOGRAPHICS
- Number of Sailing clubs: Approx. 20

AFFILIATIONS
- International federation: World Sailing (WS)
- WS member since: 1935
- Continental association: EUROSAF
- National Olympic Committee: Estonian Olympic Committee
- National Paralympic Committee: Estonian Paralympic Committee

ELECTED
- President: Sven Nuutmann

SECRETARIAT
- Address: Regati 1-5P room 306; 11911 Tallinn
- Country: Estonia
- Secretary General: Ott Kallas

FINANCE
- Company status: Association

The Estonian Yachting Union (Estonian: Eesti Jahtklubide Liit) is the national governing body for the sport of sailing in Estonia, recognised by the World Sailing.

== History ==
On 8 July 1928, the Estonian Yachting Union was founded by Haapsalu Purje- ja Sõuklubi, Kuressaare Jahtklubi, Pärnu Jahtklubi, Narva Jahtklubi, Saaremaa Merispordi Selts, and Tallinna Jahtklubi. At that time the Eestimaa Merejahtklubi represented Estonia in the International Yacht Racing Union, however in 1935, Eestimaa Merejahtklubi joined the union, leading to the union overtaking the role as representative of Estonia in the International Yacht Racing Union. In 1991, it rejoined the International Yacht Racing Union. The Estonian Yachting Union newspaper in 1989–1995 was Purjetaja.

In 2024, Sven Nuutmann was elected president of the union.

== Classes ==
The following class organisations are affiliated to the Estonian Yachting Union:

- 470
- Dragon
- ice yachting classes
- ILCA (4, 6, and 7)
- J/70
- kiteboarding classes
- match racing
- Monotype-XV
- Nordic Folkboat
- Optimist
- RS Aero
- windsurfing classes

== Notable sailors ==
See Category:Estonian sailors

=== Olympic sailing ===
See Category:Olympic sailors for Estonia

=== Offshore sailing ===
See Category:Estonian sailors (sport)
