= Piotr Kula =

Polish sailor

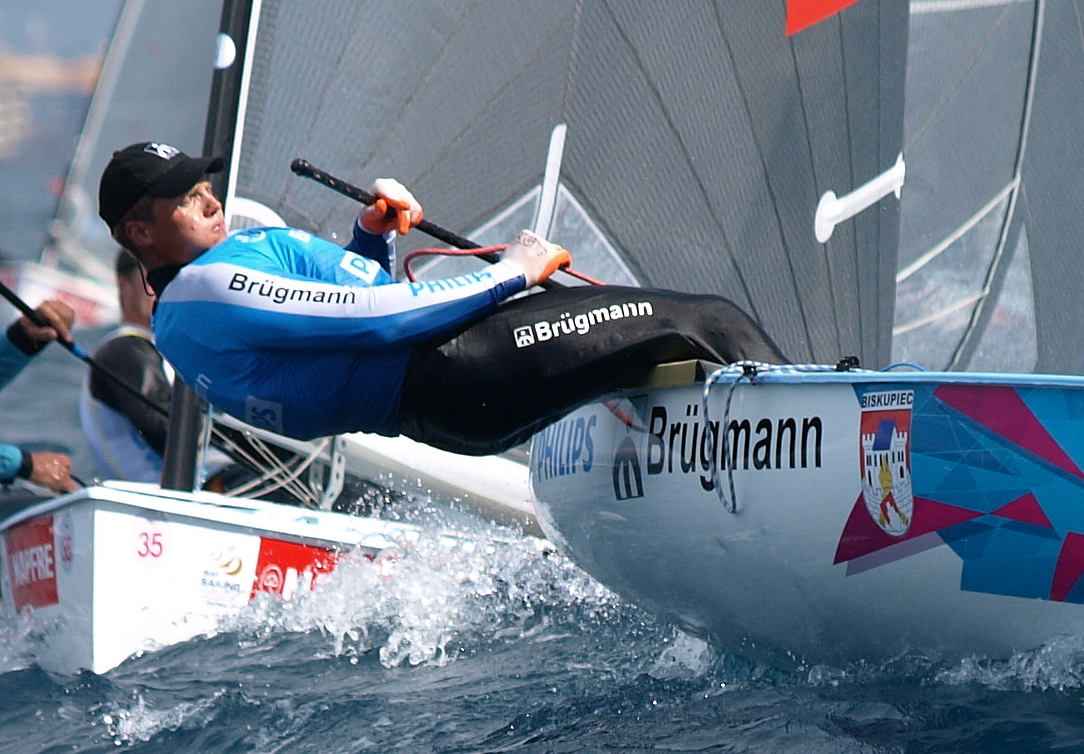
Piotr Kula

Piotr Kula (born 23 May 1987, in Olsztyn) is a Polish sailor. He competed at the 2012 Summer Olympics in the Men's Finn class.
