= Hungarian Sailing Federation =

Sports governing body

Hungarian Sailing Federation HSF
- IOC nation: Hungary (HUN)
- Sport: Sailing
- Official website: www.hunsail.hu

AFFILIATIONS
- International federation: International Sailing Federation (ISAF)
- Continental association: EUROSAF
- National Olympic Committee: Hungarian Olympic Committee

ELECTED
- President: Zoltán Gerendy

SECRETARIAT
- Address: Budapest
- Secretary General: András Holczhauser

FINANCE
- Company status: Association

The Hungarian Sailing Federation (Hungarian: Magyar Vitorlás Szövetség) is the national governing body for the sport of sailing in Hungary, recognised by the World Sailing.
