= Russian Yachting Federation =

Russian Yachting Federation RYF
- IOC nation: Russia (RUS)
- Sport: Sailing
- Official website: vfps.ru

HISTORY
- Year of formation: 1912
- Former names: Russian Yacht Racing Union

AFFILIATIONS
- International federation: International Sailing Federation (ISAF)
- ISAF members page: www.sailing.org/about/members/mnas/russia.php
- ISAF member since: 1912
- Continental association: European Sailing Federation
- National Olympic Committee: Russian Olympic Committee

ELECTED
- President: Vladimir Silkin (RUS)

SECRETARIAT
- Address: Moscow
- Secretary General: Oleg Ilyin (RUS)
- Number of staff: Approx. 10

FINANCE
- Company status: Association

The Russia Yachting Federation (Note: Russian: Всероссийская федерация парусного спорта, romanized: Vserossiyskaya federatsiya parusnogo sporta) Russia's national governing body for sailing, responsible for representing the country in international sailing organisations and competitions. Its origins date to 1912, when the Russian Yacht Racing Union was established to unite yacht clubs and sailing societies across the country. Russian sailors made their Olympic debut at the 1912 Stockholm Games, winning a bronze medal. During the Soviet era, the organisation was restructured, becoming the Yacht Racing Federation of the USSR in 1959.

Following the dissolution of the Soviet Union, the federation continued operating in the Russian Federation. In 2022, World Sailing suspended Russian and Belarusian participation in international competitions following the Russian invasion of Ukraine. A revised neutrality policy adopted in July 2025 permitted eligible Russian and Belarusian participants to return as neutral competitors. In 2026, Russian under-23 sailors were additionally permitted to compete under their national flags and anthems.

== History ==
=== Origin ===
Russian amateur yachting dates back to the Nevsky Fleet, the country's first yacht club, which Tsar Peter the Great ordered founded in 1718. The first yacht club for river sailing was founded in St. Petersburg in 1860, and by the late 19th century there were more than 50 clubs in the country. At the start of the 20th century, St. Petersburg alone had more than 20 yacht clubs, including smaller ones at Shuvalovo, Sestroretsk, Oranienbaum and Terijoki. Most yachts were bought abroad, although E. Kuhn's shipyard at a yacht club laid the foundation of sports boatbuilding in Russia, and the best Russian sea yachts were built at the St. Petersburg River Yacht Club by A. D. Rodionov. At the beginning of 1912, the Russian Yacht Racing Union was created to unite all of the country's yacht sport societies and yacht clubs. That year, Russian yachtsmen competed at the Olympic Games for the first time, in Stockholm, and won a bronze medal.

=== Soviet era ===
After the October Revolution of 1917, yacht racing developed in the trade-union sports associations and in the yacht clubs of the Soviet Navy. The Yacht Racing Section of the USSR was founded in 1936 and held the first national regatta, which was won by I. P. Matveev and N. A. Miasnikov. The construction of international-class yachts began in the 1950s in connection with Soviet participation in the Olympic Games from 1952, and in 1956 the Yacht Racing Section, which became the Yacht Racing Federation of the USSR in 1959, joined the International Yacht Racing Union. Soviet sailors won Olympic titles in 1960 (T. A. Pinegin and F. V. Shutkov), 1968 and 1972 (V. G. Mankin) and 1972 (V. F. Dyrdyra). Yacht clubs started re-emerging in Leningrad in the early 1970s. As part of the 1980 Olympic preparations, the Central Yacht Club Trud on Petrovsky Island, with room for up to 500 yachts, was reconstructed.

=== Russian Federation ===
At the 2016 Olympics in Rio de Janeiro, 19-year-old windsurfer Stefania Elfutina of Yeysk won bronze in the RS:X class, which was Russia's first Olympic sailing medal in 20 years. Elfutina said at the time that the medal showed that Russia has seas and weather conditions suited to building a strong sailing team.

== Suspension ==
World Sailing suspended Russia and Belarus from international competition on 1 March 2022, citing the war in Ukraine. In May 2023, following IOC guidance, World Sailing said that April 2024 would be the "targeted opportunity" for sailors with Russian or Belarusian passports to return as neutral athletes, through the Last Chance Regatta in Hyères, France. This was their only route to qualify for the 2024 Paris Olympics, and it meant that Russians would not compete at the 2023 World Championships in The Hague. The president of the Russian Sailing Federation, Sergey Dzhienbaev, criticized the single, non-guaranteed qualifying event as "madness."

On 23 July 2025, the World Sailing Council approved an amended neutrality policy under which Russian and Belarusian sailors, support personnel and race officials may take part in World Sailing owned and sanctioned events as neutrals, in line with IOC guidance. Boats owned by individuals sailing as neutrals were also permitted. The Council also voted to take no action against Russian and Belarusian administrators, who may continue to hold places on the Council and on its committees, sub-committees and commissions.

In 2026, the federation announced that the World Sailing Council had also allowed Russian and Belarusian athletes in the under-23 category to compete in international events under their national flag and to the sound of their national anthem. The federation said that, with the support of the Russian Olympic Committee, it would continue working toward the full reinstatement of Russian sailing on the international stage.
