= Czech Sailing Association =

Sport governing body in the Czech Republic

Czech Sailing Association ČSJ
- IOC nation: Czech Republic (CZE)
- Sport: Sailing
- Official website: www.sailing.cz

HISTORY
- Year of formation: 1929
- Former names: Czechoslovak Yachting Association

DEMOGRAPHICS
- Number of Sailing clubs: Approx. 160

AFFILIATIONS
- International federation: International Sailing Federation (ISAF)
- ISAF members page: www.sailing.org/about-isaf/mna/czech-republic.php
- Continental association: EUROSAF
- National Olympic Committee: Czech Olympic Committee

ELECTED
- President: Radim Vasik

SECRETARIAT
- Secretary General: Dana Dvorakova

FINANCE
- Company status: Association

The Czech Sailing Association (Czech: Český svaz jachtingu) is the national governing body for the sport of sailing in Czech Republic, recognised by the International Sailing Federation.

== History ==
Founded in 1929 as the Czechoslovak Yachting Association and known since 1993 as Czech Sailing Association.

== Notable sailors ==
See Category:Czech sailors

=== Olympic sailing ===
See Category:Olympic sailors of the Czech Republic

=== Offshore sailing ===
See Category:Czech sailors (sport)
