= Ioannis Mitakis =

Greek sailor

Personal information
- Nationality: Greek
- Born: 8 November 1989 (age 36)
- Height: 186 cm (6 ft 1 in)
- Weight: 96 kg (212 lb)

Sailing career
- Sport: Sailing

Ioannis Mitakis (born 8 November 1989, Marousi) is a Greek sailor. He competed at the 2012 Summer Olympics and at the 2016 Summer Olympics in the Men's Finn class. He finished in 14th place at the 2012 Summer Olympics, and in 11th at the 2016 Summer Olympics.
