= Jorge Zarif =

Brazilian sailor (born 1992)

Personal information
- Nationality: Brazil
- Born: 30 September 1992 (age 33) São Paulo, Brazil

Sailing career
- Sport: Sailing
- Coached by: Rafael Trujillo
- Class: Finn
Medal record
Representing Brazil
Finn Gold Cup
Gold medal – first place	2013 Tallinn	Finn class

Jorge João Zarif (born 30 September 1992) is a Brazilian sailor, competing in the Finn class. Son of Brazilian Olympic sailor Jorge Zarif Neto, after finishing 20th at the 2012 Summer Olympics, Zarif was world champion in both junior and senior levels, winning gold at the 2013 Youth Championship (his second title, after the 2009 edition) in Cyprus and the 2013 Finn Gold Cup in Estonia. His second Olympic appearance in 2016 had Zarif improve handily, with a fourth place finish. He returned for his third Olympic appearance at the 2020 Summer Olympics, earning 14th place.

Awards
Preceded by Arthur Zanetti	Brazilian Sportsmen of the Year; 2013	Succeeded by Arthur Zanetti
