= Eduard Skornyakov =

Russian sailor

Eduard Mikhaylovich Skornyakov (Эдуард Михайлович Скорняков, born 16 October 1980) is a Russian sailor. He competed at the 2008 Summer Olympics in Beijing, where he placed 17th in the Finn class. He competed in the same class at the 2012 Summer Olympics, finishing in 17th again.
