= Ivan Kljaković Gašpić =

Croatian sailor

Medal record

Sailing

Representing Croatia

World Championships
Silver medal – second place	2014 Santander	Finn
Bronze medal – third place	2009 Vallensbeak	Finn

European Championships
Gold medal – first place	2009 Varna	Finn
Gold medal – first place	2010 Split	Finn
Gold medal – first place	2015 Split	Finn
Silver medal – second place	2011 Helsinki	Finn
Bronze medal – third place	2008 Scarlino	Finn
Bronze medal – third place	2012 Scarlino	Finn

Ivan Kljaković Gašpić (born 24 May 1984) is a Croatian sailor. He competed at the 2008 and 2012 Summer Olympics in the Men's Finn class. He is a member of the JK Zenta sailing club in Croatia. His coach is Marin Siriscevic.

== Sailing career ==
Gašpić started sailing at age 12 in an Optimist dinghy, encouraged by his father. He competed for the first time in 1997, and became the Optimist European Champion in 1998. The same year, he was named Dalmatia Athlete of the Year. He went on to win other junior competitions, becoming the European Junior Laser champion in 2003 and the European and World Junior Finn class champion in 2005. He won a silver medal at the 2007 Finn European Championship.

He later competed in the 2008 Summer Olympics in Beijing, placing eighth in the Finn class competition. The following year, he won a bronze medal at the Finn Gold Cup in Denmark, and in 2011 he placed tenth in the Finn class event at the ISAF Sailing World Championships in Perth.

He first entered the top 10 in the International Sailing Federation's Finn class world rankings in May 2006, and was placed number 1 in July 2009. He has remained in the top 5 since then, and is currently ranked third.

At the 2012 Summer Olympics, he finished in 5th place.

== Personal life ==
Gašpić currently lives in Solin, Croatia. He is married and has two children. His nickname is Bambi. His 2012 Olympic profile lists his height as 189 cm and his weight as 95 kg.
