= Jonathan Lobert =

French sailor (born 1985)

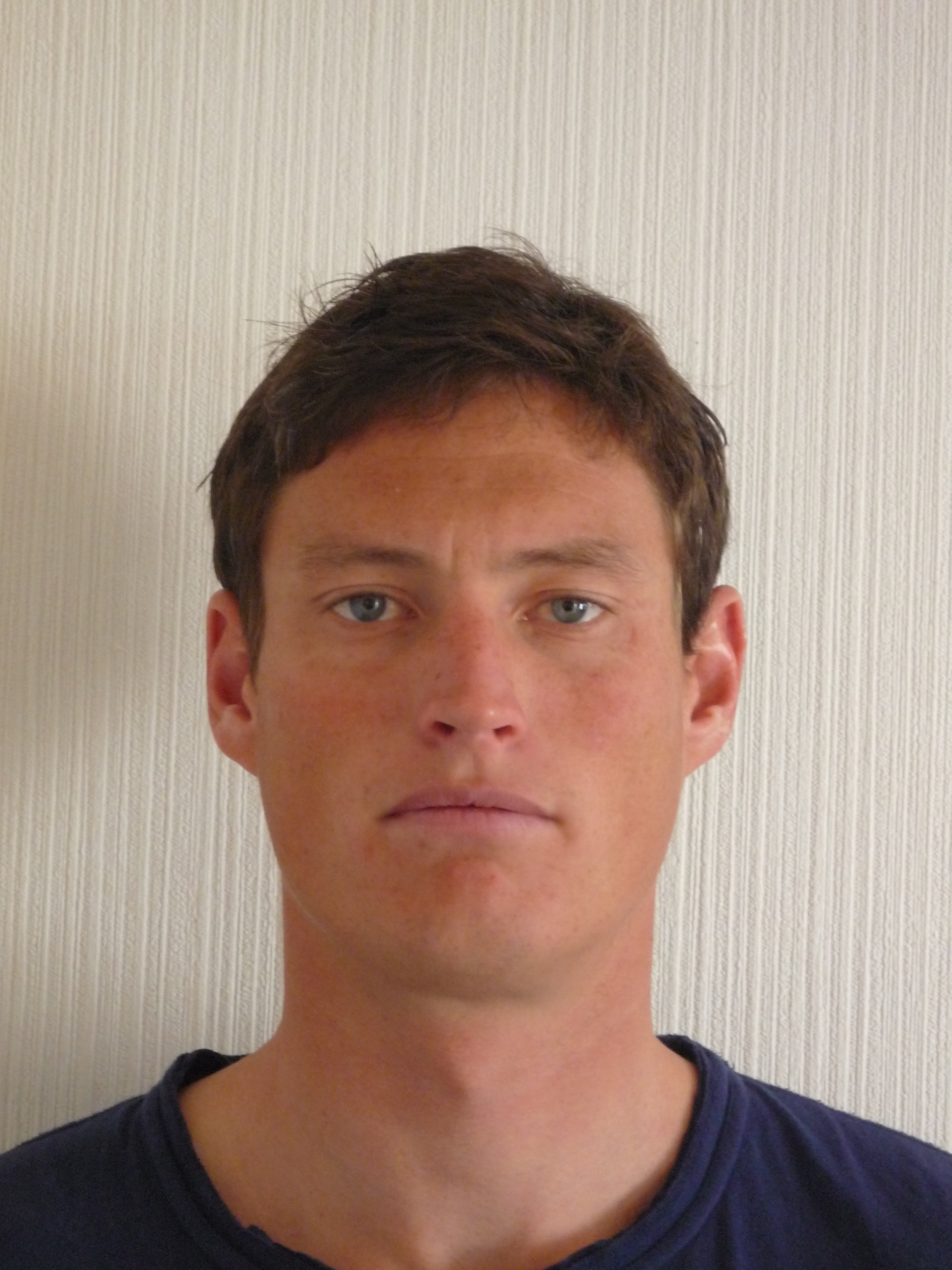

Medal record

Men's sailing

Representing France

Olympic Games
Bronze medal – third place	2012 London	Finn class

World Championships
Silver medal – second place	2015 Takapuna	Finn class
Silver medal – second place	2017 Balatonföldvár	Finn class

Jonathan Lobert (born 30 April 1985 at Metz) is a French sailor. He competed at the 2012 Summer Olympics in the Men's Finn class, where he obtained the bronze medal.
