= Alican Kaynar =

Turkish yacht racer

Personal information
- Nationality: Turkish
- Born: 30 October 1988 (age 37) Istanbul, Turkey
- Education: Industrial engineering at Bahçeşehir University
- Height: 1.91 m (6 ft 3 in) (2012)
- Weight: 100 kg (220 lb) (2012)

Sport
- Country: Turkey
- Sport: Sailing
- Event: Finn class
- Club: Fenerbahçe Sailing
- Coached by: Mehmet Dinçay
Medal record
Men's sailing
Representing Turkey
Balkan Championships
Gold medal – first place	2010 Burgas	J Finn
Silver medal – second place	2009 Donji Milanovac	J Finn

Alican Kaynar (born 30 October 1988) is a Turkish yacht racer competing in the Finn class. The 1.91 m (6 ft 3 in) tall athlete at 100 kg (220 lb) is a member of Fenerbahçe Sailing, where he is coached by Mehmet Dinçay.

Alican Kaynar is a student of Industrial engineering at the Bahçeşehir University, Istanbul.

He qualified for participation at the 2012 Summer Olympics, in the Finn class event, he placed 18th with 154 points. He competed in the same event at the 2016 Olympics, finishing in 13th.

== Achievements ==
Year	Competition	Venue	Position	Event	Notes
Representing Turkey
2009	Athens Eurolymp Week	Athens, Greece	8th	Finn	
2009	Istanbul Sail Week	Istanbul, Turkey	2nd	Finn	
2009	Balkan & Open Sailing Championship	Donji Milanovac, Serbia	2nd	Junior Finn	
2010	Balkan & Open Sailing Championship	Burgas, Bulgaria	1st	Junior Finn	
2011	Expert Garda Week	Garda, Italy	14th	Finn	
2012	London Olympic Games	Weymouth, Great Britain	18th	Finn	
2013	2013 Finn European Championship	Warnemünde, Germany	10th	Finn	
2016	Rio Olympic Games	Marina da Glória, Brazil	13th	Finn	
2017	Sailing World Cup	Hyères, France	1st	Finn	
