= Tapio Nirkko =

Finnish sailor

Tapio Kalevi Nirkko (born 24 August 1984 in Espoo) is a Finnish sailor. He competed at the 2008 and 2012 Summer Olympics in the Men's Finn class.
