= Deaths in December 2002 =

The following is a list of notable deaths in December 2002.

Entries for each day are listed alphabetically by surname. A typical entry lists information in the following sequence:

- Name, age, country of citizenship at birth, subsequent country of citizenship (if applicable), reason for notability, cause of death (if known), and reference.

== December 2002 ==
=== 1 ===
- Abu Abraham, 78, Indian cartoonist, journalist, and author.
- Edward L. Beach Jr., 84, United States Navy submarine officer and author (Run Silent, Run Deep).
- Omar Blebel, 80, Argentine Olympic wrestler (1948, 1952).
- Bernard Blossac, 85, French fashion illustrator.
- Cassius Chapin Cutler, 87, American communications engineer.
- Carlos Delgado, 53, Ecuadorian footballer.
- Harry Dick, 80, Canadian ice hockey player (Chicago Black Hawks).
- William Geimer, 65, American lawyer, founder of the Jamestown Foundation.
- Edo Marion, 92, Slovenian Olympic fencer (1936).
- John L. McLucas, 82, American politician and U.S. Secretary of the Air Force.
- Dave McNally, 60, American baseball player (Baltimore Orioles, Montreal Expos), lung cancer.
- José Chávez Morado, 93, Mexican artist.
- Boris Schapiro, 93, British international bridge player.
- Sára Szenteleki-Ligetkuti, 57, Hungarian Olympic middle-distance runner (1972).

=== 2 ===
- Elizabeth B. Andrews, 91, American politician (U.S. Representative for Alabama's 3rd congressional district).
- Barney Berlinger, 94, American Olympic decathlon athlete (1928).
- Frank Bradley, 84, American baseball player.
- Achille Castiglioni, 84, Italian industrial designer.
- Aileen Fisher, 96, American children's writer (The Coffee-Pot Face, Runny Days, Sunny Days).
- Ivan Illich, 76, Austrian Roman Catholic priest, theologian, and social critic, brain cancer.
- Boris Ivanov, 82, Soviet and Russian film and theater actor.
- György Marx, 75, Hungarian physicist, astrophysicist, and science historian.
- Jim Mitchell, 56, Irish politician, cancer.
- Arno Peters, 86, German historian and filmmaker.
- Billy Reynolds, 71, American football player (Cleveland Browns, Pittsburgh Steelers, Oakland Raiders).
- Vjenceslav Richter, 85, Croatian architect.
- Edgar Scherick, 78, American television executive and producer.
- Mehmet Emin Toprak, 28, Turkish film actor, traffic collision.
- Ben Wade, 80, American baseball player (Chicago Cubs, Brooklyn Dodgers, St. Louis Cardinals, Pittsburgh Pirates) and scout.
- Mal Waldron, 77, American jazz pianist and composer (Billie Holiday, Charles Mingus, John Coltrane).
- Fay Gillis Wells, 94, American pioneer aviator.

=== 3 ===
- Adrienne Adams, 96, American children's writer and illustrator.
- Hariharananda Giri, 95, Indian yogi and guru.
- Pierre Guillaume, 77, French Navy officer, cancer.
- Walt Jurkiewicz, 83, American football player (Detroit Lions).
- Klaus Löwitsch, 66, German actor, pancreatic cancer.
- Emanuel Papper, 87, American anesthesiologist.
- Rusty Payne, 80, American baseball player.
- Glenn Quinn, 32, Irish actor (Roseanne, Angel), heroin overdose.
- Jug Thesenga, 88, American baseball player (Washington Senators).

=== 4 ===
- Charles Pierce Davey, 77, American welterweight boxer, complications from paralysis.
- Noémia de Sousa, 76, Mozambican poet.
- Robert Mallet, 87, French writer and academic.
- Hemmo Silvennoinen, 70, Finnish Olympic ski jumper (1956).
- Ivo Vesely, 76, Australian ice hockey player (1956).
- Kacie Woody, 13, American murder victim.

=== 5 ===
- Roone Arledge, 71, American television producer and executive (Monday Night Football, Nightline), prostate cancer.
- Bob Berg, 51, American jazz saxophonist, traffic collision.
- Prosper Boulanger, 84, Canadian politician and a member of Parliament (House of Commons representing Mercier, Quebec).
- Geoff Coombes, 83, American soccer player.
- George Karstens, 78, American football player (Detroit Lions).
- Ne Win, 91, Burmese politician and dictator.
- Arvell Shaw, 79, American jazz double-bassist.
- Einar Skinnarland, 84, Norwegian resistance fighter during World War II.
- Ann Welch, 85, British glider pilot (gliding, hang gliding, paragliding, microlight flying).

=== 6 ===
- Jerzy Adamski, 65, Polish featherweight boxer and Olympian (1960).
- Clarence Beers, 83, American baseball player (St. Louis Cardinals).
- Philip Berrigan, 79, American priest and political activist, kidney cancer.
- Antonino Caponnetto, 82, Italian Antimafia magistrate.
- William Henry Gleysteen, 76, American diplomat and ambassador, leukemia.
- Keld Karise, 85, Danish Olympic rower (1936).
- Gerhard Löwenthal, 79, German journalist, human rights activist and author.
- Kevin McLaverty, 66, Irish Olympic sailor (1972).
- Ortunho, 67, Brazilian footballer.

=== 7 ===
- R. Orin Cornett, 89, American physicist, university professor and inventor of Cued Speech.
- John R. Dellenback, 84, American politician (U.S. Representative for Oregon's 4th congressional district), viral pneumonia.
- Gunnar Helén, 84, Swedish liberal politician.
- Barbara Howard, 76, Canadian painter, wood engraver, and bookbinder, pulmonary embolism.
- Ján Jendek, 71, Slovak ice hockey player and Olympian (1956).
- Cal Lepore, 83, American gridiron football referee.
- Ray Monaco, 84, American football player (Washington Redskins, Cleveland Rams).
- Paddy Tunney, 81, Irish traditional artist.

=== 8 ===
- Giorgio Favaro, 58, Italian cyclist.
- Bobby Joe Hill, 59, American basketball player, heart attack.
- Melvin Lax, 80, American physics professor, cancer.
- Anil Moonesinghe, 75, Sri Lankan revolutionary politician and trade unionist.
- Eric Prentice, 76, Canadian ice hockey player (Toronto Maple Leafs).
- Charles Rosen, 85, American computer scientist.
- Dorothy Walker, 73, Irish art critic and historian.

=== 9 ===
- Alister Atkinson, 77, New Zealans rugby footballer.
- Shigeru Chiba, 83, Japanese baseball player and manager.
- Joly Garbi, 90, Greek actress.
- Mary Hansen, 36, Australian guitarist and singer, traffic collision.
- Ian Hornak, 58, American draughtsman, painter and printmaker, aortic aneurysm.
- To Huu, 82, Vietnamese poet and politician.
- Johnny Lazor, 90, American baseball player (Boston Red Sox).
- Stan Rice, 60, American painter, educator, poet, husband of author Anne Rice, cancer.
- Theodore Shackley, 75, American CIA officer known as "the Blond Ghost", cancer.

=== 10 ===
- Les Costello, 74, Canadian ice hockey player (Toronto Maple Leafs) and Catholic priest.
- Kurt Heintel, 78, Austrian film and television actor.
- Earl Henry, 85, American baseball player (Cleveland Indians).
- Átila Iório, 81, Brazilian actor, pulmonary emphysema.
- Mike Kosman, 85, American basketball player (Cincinnati Reds).
- Andres Küng, 57, Swedish journalist, writer, and politician.
- Steve Llewellyn, 78, Welsh rugby player.
- Ian MacNaughton, 76, Scottish director of most episodes of Monty Python's Flying Circus.
- Hady Pfeiffer, 96, Austrian Olympic alpine skier (1936).
- Julie Schmitt, 89, German gymnast and Olympic champion (1936).
- Homer Spragins, 82, American baseball player (Philadelphia Phillies).
- Peter Tanner, 88, British film editor.

=== 11 ===
- Domocao Alonto, 88, Filipino lawyer, author, and Islamic figure.
- Luis Ciges, 81, Spanish film actor, heart attack.
- Dolly Dawn, 86, American big band vocalist and recording star of the 1930s and 1940s.
- Muzaffer Demirhan, 70, Turkish Olympic alpine skier (1948, 1956, 1960, 1964).
- Bob Loane, 88, American baseball player (Washington Senators, Boston Bees).
- Arthur Metcalfe, 64, British racing cyclist, cancer.
- Nanabhoy Palkhivala, 82, Indian jurist, economist and civil rights leader.
- Marvin Breckinridge Patterson, 97, American photojournalist, cinematographer, and philanthropist.
- Zbigniew Radziwonowicz, 72, Polish Olympic javelin thrower (1952, 1960).
- Kay Rose, 80, American Oscar-winning sound editor, organ dysfunction.
- Lou Stein, 80, American jazz pianist.

=== 12 ===
- Mykola Amosov, 89, Soviet/Ukrainian heart surgeon and inventor.
- Dee Brown, 94, American author and historian (Bury My Heart at Wounded Knee), heart failure.
- Nancy Caroline, 58, American EMS physician and writer (Emergency Care in the Streets), multiple myeloma.
- Brad Dexter, 85, American actor and film producer (Run Silent Run Deep, The Magnificent Seven, None but the Brave), pulmonary emphysema.
- Edward Harrison, 92, English cricketer.
- Kazuo Kasahara, 75, Japanese screenwriter.
- Víctor Latou, 89, Uruguayan Olympic basketball player (1936).
- Jabir Novruz, 69, Azerbaijani artist and poet.
- Orlando Villas-Bôas, 88, Brazilian explorer and anthropologist.

=== 13 ===
- Carlos Agostí, 80, Spanish-Mexican film actor.
- Ronald Barnes, 61, Brazilian tennis player, cancer.
- Maria Björnson, 53, French theatre designer, two-time Tony Award winner for The Phantom of the Opera (Best Scenic Design, Best Costume Design).
- Stella Brooks, 92, American jazz singer of the 1940s.
- Ronald Butt, 82, British journalist, political columnist and writer.
- Ksenia Kepping, 65, Russian linguist and tangutologist.
- Anthony Ler, 35, Singaporean graphic designer and convicted murderer, execution by hanging.
- Shirley O'Hara, 78, American actress, diabetes.
- Zal Yanovsky, 57, Canadian folk rock musician, lead guitarist and singer for The Lovin' Spoonful, heart attack.
- Lucien Zins, 80, French Olympic swimmer (1948, 1952).

=== 14 ===
- Hank Arft, 80, American baseball player (St. Louis Browns).
- Ib Bengtsson, 75, Danish footballer.
- Jack Bradley, 86, English football player.
- Sidney Glazier, 86, American film producer.
- Ken Higgs, 72, Canadian football player.
- Ruth Kobart, 78, American performer, pancreatic cancer.
- Salman Raduyev, 35, Chechen separatist field commander, internal bleeding.
- Enrique Tarigo, 75, Uruguayan jurist and political figure, lung cancer.
- Frank Warren, 43, American gridiron football player (New Orleans Saints), heart attack.
- Ray Wietecha, 74, American gridiron football player (Michigan State, New York Giants) and coach.

=== 15 ===
- T. Abdul Rahman, 68, Indian footballer and Olympian (1956).
- John Crosby, 76, American conductor, founded the Santa Fe Opera.
- Charles E. Fraser, 73, American real estate developer, transformed Hilton Head Island into a world-class resort.
- Vladimir Haensel, 88, American chemical engineer.
- Jan Mikołajczak, 95, Polish rower and Olympic medalist (1932).
- Dick Stuart, 70, American baseball player (Pittsburgh Pirates, Boston Red Sox, Philadelphia Phillies), cancer.

=== 16 ===
- Manuel E. Buadas, 77, Uruguayan air force general, Commander-in-Chief of the Uruguayan Air Force (1982–1985).
- Bill Hunter, 82, Canadian ice hockey player, general manager and coach, cancer.
- Rolston James, 26, Trinidadian footballer.
- Richard Johnson Putnam, 89, American district judge (United States District Court for the Western District of Louisiana).
- Licínio Rangel, 66, Brazilian Roman Catholic bishop.
- Nighat Sultana, 67, Pakistani actress.
- Don Vesco, 63, American businessperson and motorcycle racer, prostate cancer.

=== 17 ===
- Luis Castro, 81, Uruguayan footballer.
- Colin Clark, 70, British film director and writer (My Week with Marilyn).
- Muhammad Hamidullah, 94, Indian Hadith scholar and academic author.
- Aideu Handique, 87, Indian actress.
- James Hazeldine, 55, English actor and director, aortic dissection.
- Frederick Knott, 86, English playwright and screenwriter (Dial M for Murder).
- Hank Luisetti, 86, American basketball player and innovator.
- Aleksei Pogorelov, 83, Soviet mathematician.
- Paul Ramelet, 93, Swiss Olympic sailor (1964).
- Boris Tokarev, 75, Soviet sprinter and Olympic silver medalist (1952, 1956).

=== 18 ===
- Saul Amarel, 74, American computer scientist and artificial intelligence pioneer.
- Earl Audet, 81, American professional football player (USC, Washington Redskins, Los Angeles Dons) and actor.
- Mahmoud Fayad, 77, Egyptian Olympic weightlifter (1948).
- Henry Gibson, 60, American percussionist.
- Lucy Grealy, 39, Irish-American poet and memoirist, drug overdose.
- Necip Hablemitoğlu, 48, Turkish historian and intellectual, shot.
- Ray Hnatyshyn, 68, Canadian politician and Governor General of Canada, pancreatitis.
- Bert Millichip, 88, British football player and administrator.
- Edward Norris, 91, American film actor.
- Wayne Owens, 65, American politician and a member of Congress, heart attack.
- Jan Łomnicki, 73, Polish film director and screenwriter.
- Antoine Shousha, 75, Egyptian Olympic sports shooter (1952).

=== 19 ===
- Claude Crocker, 78, American baseball player (Brooklyn Dodgers).
- Will Hoy, 49, British racing driver.
- Barbara Lott, 82, British actress.
- Kote Makharadze, 76, Soviet and Georgian actor and sports commentator, stroke.
- Hrant Matevosyan, 67, Armenian writer and screenwriter.
- Bob McChesney, 76, American football player (New York Giants).
- Matthias Noichl, 82, Austrian Olympic cross country skier (1948, 1952).
- Babubhai J. Patel, 91, India politician and chief minister.
- Bob Rinker, 81, American baseball player (Philadelphia Athletics).
- Arthur Rowley, 76, English footballer, holder of the record for most career league goals.
- Aleksandar Sarievski, 80, Macedonian singer-songwriter.
- Roger Webb, 68, British musical director and composer (The Godsend, The Boy in Blue, Death of a Centerfold).
- George Weller, 95, American World War II journalist.

=== 20 ===
- Joanne Campbell, 38, British actress, starred in the 1980s comedy series Me and My Girl, deep-vein thrombosis.
- James Richard Ham, 91, American Roman Catholic prelate.
- Ab Hardy, 93, Canadian Olympic speed skater (1948).
- Gordon McCarter, 71, American gridiron football official.
- Keith Pavitt, 65, English academic.
- Grote Reber, 90, American pioneer of radio astronomy.
- Fritz Røed, 74, Norwegian sculptor.
- Raymond Sabounghi, 71, Egyptian Olympic basketball player (1952).
- Tore Tønne, 54, Norwegian politician, suicide.

=== 21 ===
- Jeu van Bun, 84, Dutch football player and Olympian (1948).
- Duke Callaghan, 88, American cinematographer (Conan the Barbarian, Jeremiah Johnson, Miami Vice).
- Max Cohen, 70, French cyclist.
- José Hierro, 80, Spanish poet, pulmonary emphysema.
- Giò Pomodoro, 72, Italian sculptor, printmaker, and stage designer.
- Victor Watts, 64, British toponymist, medievalist, and academic, heart attack.

=== 22 ===
- Mario Ruiz Armengol, 88, Mexican pianist, composer, arranger, and conductor.
- William G. Bennett, 78, American gaming executive and real estate developer (Circus Circus Enterprises).
- Ian Craib, 57, English sociologist and psychotherapist (The Importance of Disappointment).
- María Escribano, 48, Spanish composer and music teacher.
- Susan Fleming, 94, American actress (Million Dollar Legs, The Ziegfeld Follies) and wife of actor Harpo Marx, heart attack.
- Sanaa Gamil, 72, Egyptian actress, stomach cancer.
- Louis Haynes, 42, American football player (Kansas City Chiefs).
- Julius S. Held, 97, German art historian.
- Desmond Hoyte, 73, President of Guyana from 1985 to 1992.
- Wilhelm Kment, 88, Austrian football player and manager.
- Srboljub Krivokuća, 74, Yugoslav and Serbian football manager and player.
- Joe Strummer, 50, former singer for The Clash, heart attack.
- Clay Tanner, 71, American actor.
- Kenneth Tobey, 85, American actor (Twelve O'Clock High, Gunfight at the O.K. Corral, The Thing from Another World).
- Gabrielle Wittkop, 82, French writer (The Necrophiliac), suicide.

=== 23 ===
- Tatamkhulu Afrika, 82, South African poet and writer, struck by vehicle.
- Anthony Besch, 78, British opera and theatre director (English National Opera, Scottish Opera, New Opera Company).
- George Bullard, 74, American baseball player (Detroit Tigers).
- John Henry Kyl, 83, American politician, member of the United States House of Representatives (1959-1965, 1967-1973).
- Bep du Mée, 88, Dutch athlete and Olympian (1932).
- Derek Miller, 66, British Olympic field hockey player (1960, 1964).
- Ratheesh, 48, Indian film actor, heart attack.

=== 24 ===
- Kjell Aukrust, 82, Norwegian author, poet, artist and humorist.
- Miguel Busquets, 82, Chilean footballer.
- Luciano Chailly, 82, French-Italian composer and arts administrator.
- Ward Cuff, 89, American football player (New York Giants, Chicago Cardinals, Green Bay Packers).
- James Ferman, 72, American-British film censor and director of British Board of Film Classification.
- Erroll Fraser, 52, British Virgin Island speed skater (1984).
- Gaston Gerosa, 79, Swiss Olympic cyclist (1948)..
- Yuriy Lorentsson, 72, Soviet Russian rower and Olympian (1960, 1964, 1968, 1972, 1976).
- Tita Merello, 98, Argentinian actress and singer.
- V. K. Ramasamy, 76, Indian actor.
- Richie Regan, 72, American basketball player (Rochester/Cincinnati Royals), and coach, heart failure.
- Jake Thackray, 64, English singer-songwriter, heart failure.
- Mihai Țurcaș, 60, Romanian sprint canoeist and Olympic medalist (1964, 1968).
- Arch Wilder, 85, Canadian ice hockey player (Detroit Red Wings).

=== 25 ===
- Gabriel Almond, 91, American political scientist.
- Íñigo Cavero, 73, Spanish aristocrat, lawyer and politician.
- Helmut Jagielski, 68, German footballer.
- Attilio Lambertini, 82, Italian racing cyclist.
- Tine Logar, 86, Slovenian historical linguist, dialectologist, and academic.
- Theo Merkel, 68, German Olympic biathlete (1968, 1972).
- William T. Orr, 85, American television executive producer (Maverick, F-Troop, 77 Sunset Strip).
- Davina Whitehouse, 90, British-New Zealand actress (Night Nurse, Sleeping Dogs, Braindead), stroke.

=== 26 ===
- Louis Laurie, 85, American boxer and Olympian (1936).
- Åke Lindström, 74, Swedish actor and film director.
- Al Lujack, 82, American basketball player (Washington Capitols).
- Ilrey Oliver, 40, Jamaican Olympic sprinter (1984).
- Heinz Raack, 85, German field hockey player and Olympic silver medalist (1936).
- Frank Reiber, 93, American baseball player (Detroit Tigers).
- Herb Ritts, 50, American celebrity and fashion photographer, pneumonia.
- Armand Zildjian, 81, Armenian-American entrepreneur and manufacturer of cymbals.

=== 27 ===
- Truid Blaisse-Terwindt, 85, Dutch field hockey- and tennis player.
- Jorge Cermesoni, 94, Argentine Olympic fencer (1948).
- Bill Chipley, 82, American professional football player (Boston Yanks, New York Bulldogs).
- Judy Clark, 81, American film and television actress and singer.
- Daniel Deffayet, 80, French classical saxophonist.
- Youssef Fakhr Eddine, 67, Egyptian actor.
- Carla Henius, 83, German soprano, mezzo-soprano and librettist.
- George Roy Hill, 81, American film director (Butch Cassidy and the Sundance Kid, The Sting, Slap Shot), Parkinson's disease.
- Olli Lounasmaa, 72, Finnish experimental physicist and neuroscientist, drowned.
- Yayori Matsui, 68, Japanese journalist and women's rights activist, cancer.
- Pratima Barua Pandey, 68, Indian folk singer.
- Anatoly Shevchenko, 62, Soviet Russian Olympic handball player (1972).
- Ruth Svedberg, 99, Swedish track and field athlete and Olympic medalist (1928).
- Masayuki Takahashi, 40, Japanese Olympic sailor (1988).
- María Luisa Zea, 89, Mexican actress and singer.

=== 28 ===
- Maria Carbone, 94, Italian operatic soprano.
- Vladimir Chuyan, 62, Soviet Russian Olympic sports shooter (1964).
- José Cibrián, 86, Argentine actor.
- Fadia of Egypt, 59, Egyptian princess.
- Clyde Goodnight, 78, American gridiron football player (Green Bay Packers, Washington Redskins).
- Achyut Kanvinde, 86, Indian architect.
- Koreyoshi Kurahara, 75, Japanese screenwriter and director, pneumonia.
- Albert Stubbins, 83, English footballer.
- Per Voksø, 79, Norwegian newspaper editor and Christian leader.
- Meri Wilson, 53, American model and singer-songwriter ("Telephone Man"), traffic collision.

=== 29 ===
- Al Babartsky, 87, American gridiron football player (Fordham University, Chicago Cardinals, Chicago Bears).
- Lloyd Barbee, 77, American lawyer and politician.
- Billy Brown, 84, American triple jumper, long jumper (1941 world long jump leader), and Olympian (1936).
- Ralph Clanton, 88, American actor of film, stage, and television.
- Don Clarke, 69, New Zealand rugby player.
- John G. Dreyfus, 84, British typographer and printing historian.
- Paul Hawkins, 90, British politician.
- Kaneshiro Kōfuku, 49, Japanese sumo wrestler.
- Lorenzo Miguel, 75, Argentine labor leader, kidney failure.
- Albert Oganezov, 53, Soviet Russian Olympic handball player (1972).
- Július Satinský, 61, Slovak actor and comedian.
- Foster Watkins, 85, American football player (Philadelphia Eagles).
- Robert Wierinckx, 87, Belgian road bicycle racer.

=== 30 ===
- Mary Brian, 96, American actress, silent and sound film star (Peter Pan, The Virginian, Charlie Chan in Paris, Man on the Flying Trapeze), cardiovascular disease.
- Barbara Durham, 60, American judge, first female chief justice of the Washington Supreme Court.
- Wang Fanxi, 95, Chinese Trotskyist revolutionary.
- Eleanor J. Gibson, 92, American psychologist.
- Egon Hansen, 71, Danish Olympic sports shooter (1972).
- Jo Jo Heath, 45, American football player (Cincinnati Bengals, Los Angeles Raiders, New York Jets).
- Stan Javie, 83, American gridiron football player.
- Antony Ponzini, 69, American actor.
- Carl Schwende, 82, Canadian Olympic fencer (1960).
- Mary Wesley, 90, English novelist (Jumping the Queue, The Camomile Lawn, Part of the Furniture).

=== 31 ===
- Kazimierz Dejmek, 78, Polish actor, theatre and film director, and politician.
- D. J. Enright, 82, British poet, novelist and critic.
- Giovanni Rossi Lomanitz, 81, American physicist, cancer.
- Kaare Meland, 87, Norwegian politician.
- Zygmunt Milewski, 68, Polish Olympic boxer (1956).
- Hanni Ossott, 56, Venezuelan poet, translator and critic.
- Li Rong, 82, Chinese linguist.
- Desmond Tester, 83, English film and television actor and television presenter.
- Flaviano Vicentini, 60, Italian road race cyclist.
