= Geimer =

Geimer is a surname. Notable people with the surname include:

- Gene Geimer (born 1949), American soccer player
- William Geimer (1937–2002), American lawyer and government official
- Samantha Geimer, Roman Polanski abuse victim

== See also ==
- Geiger (surname)
