= Nonreturner =

Nonreturner may refer to:

- Anāgāmi, a partially enlightened person in Buddhism
- Nevozvrashchentsy ('Nonreturnees'), Soviet citizens who emigrated from the Eastern Bloc
