= Jamestown Foundation =

American think tank

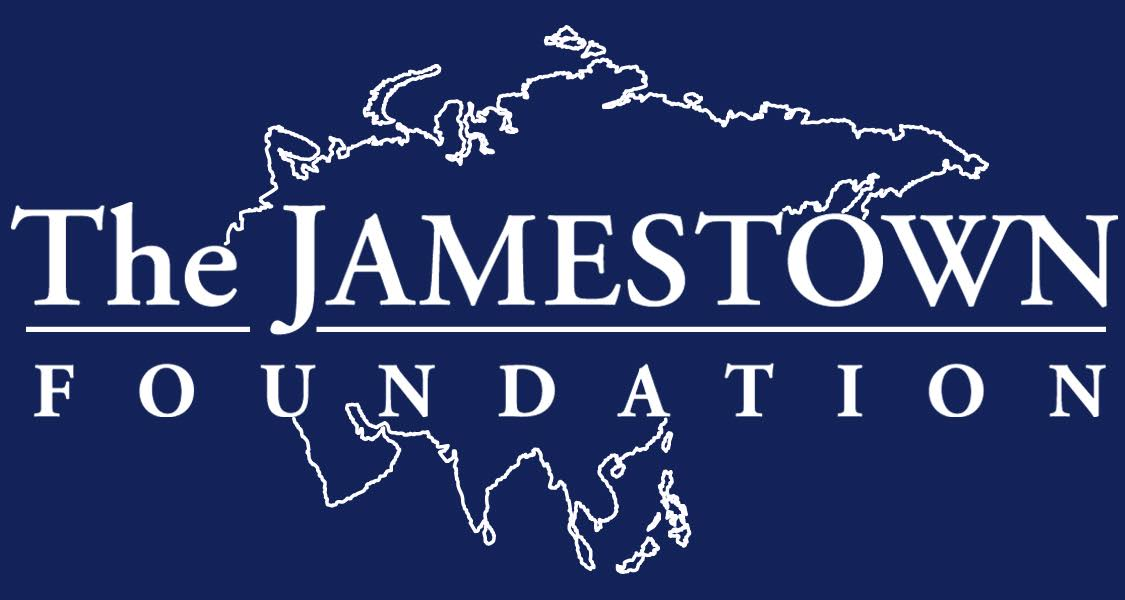
- The foundation's Logo
- Formation: 1984; 42 years ago
- Founder: William W. Geimer
- Type: 501(c)(3) organization
- Tax ID no.: 36-3266722
- Headquarters: Washington, D.C., U.S.
- President: Peter Mattis
- Website: jamestown.org

The Jamestown Foundation is a Washington, D.C.–based non-partisan defense policy think tank. Founded in 1984 as a platform to support Soviet defectors, its stated mission is to inform and educate policy makers about events and trends that it regards as being of current strategic importance to the United States. Jamestown publications focus on China, Russia, Eurasia, and global terrorism.

== History ==
The Jamestown Foundation was founded in 1984 after Arkady Shevchenko, the highest-ranking Soviet official ever to defect when he left his position as Under-Secretary-General of the United Nations, defected in 1978. William Geimer, an American lawyer, had been working closely with Shevchenko, and established the foundation as a vehicle to promote the writings of the former Soviet diplomat and those of Ion Pacepa, a former top Romanian intelligence officer; with the help of the foundation, both defectors published bestselling books.

Central Intelligence Agency Director William J. Casey helped back the formation of the Jamestown Foundation, agreeing with its complaints that the U.S. intelligence community did not provide sufficient funding for Soviet bloc defectors. The foundation, initially also dedicated to supporting Soviet dissidents, also aided defecting intellectuals from the Eastern Bloc in disseminating their ideas in the West.

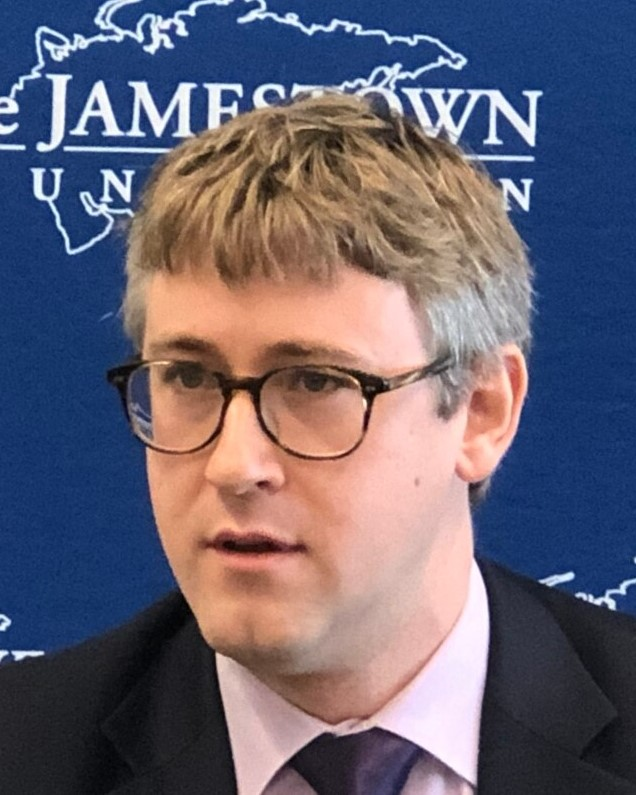
Peter Mattis, president of the Jamestown Foundation since September 2023

In September 2023, Peter Mattis was named Jamestown president, succeeding Glen E. Howard, who held the position for 20 years.

== Activities ==
Its primary focus is on China, Eurasia, Russia, and global terrorism. As of 2023, its main publications are China Brief, Eurasia Daily Monitor, Terrorism Monitor, and Militant Leadership Monitor. Previous publications included Eurasia Security Trends, Fortnight in Review, North Korea Review, Russia and Eurasia Review, Russia's Week, Spotlight on Terror, North Caucasus Weekly, (formerly Chechnya Weekly) and Recent From Turkey and Terrorism Focus. Along with these publications, Jamestown produces occasional reports and books.

From 1995 to 1997, the Jamestown Foundation issued Prism: A Monthly on the Post-Soviet States.

== Nikolai Getman collection ==
The foundation hosted Russian artist Nikolai Getman's paintings of Gulag camps. Getman was imprisoned for eight years by the Soviet regime for participating in anti-Soviet propaganda as a result of a caricature of Joseph Stalin that one of his friends had drawn on a cigarette box. He survived, and for four decades he secretly labored at creating a visual record of the Gulag system. In September 2009, the Jamestown Foundation transferred the Getman collection to The Heritage Foundation.

== Reception ==
In 2007, the Russian government said the think tank was spreading anti-Russian propaganda by hosting a debate on violence in the Russian republic of Ingushetia. According to a statement by the Foreign Ministry of Russia: "Organisers again and again resorted to deliberately spreading slander about the situation in Chechnya and other republics of the Russian North Caucasus using the services of supporters of terrorists and pseudo-experts. Speakers were given carte blanche to spread extremist propaganda, incite ethnic and inter-religious discord." In response, Jamestown Foundation president Glen Howard said that Russia was "intimidated by the power of the free word and this goes against the state manipulation of the media in Russia".

On 8 December 2011, Ambassador Daniel Benjamin, State Department Counterterrorism Coordinator for the Obama administration, gave the keynote address at Jamestown's Fifth Annual Terrorism Conference where he praised Jamestown for its research and analysis of terrorism issues.

The Jamestown Foundation was criticized by the Right Web project (now the "Militarist Monitor" project) based at the Institute for Policy Studies for alleged links to the CIA and for advancing a right-wing, neoconservative agenda.

In 2020, the office of the Prosecutor-General of Russia said that Jamestown Foundation's publications sought to fan separatism in some Russian regions and posed a security threat. It described the Foundation as an "undesirable organisation", which could result in the organization being banned in Russia under the Russian foreign agent law.
