= Jeu =

Jeu (French for "game") may refer to:

- Jeu (film), a 2006 Canadian animated short
- Le Jeu (2018 film), a French film
- Books of Jeu, two 3rd century Gnostic texts
- Jeu van Bun (1918–2002), Dutch footballer nicknamed "Jeu"
- Jeu Sprengers (1938–2008), nicknamed "Jeu", Dutch chairman of the Royal Dutch Football Association
- jeu, ISO 639-3 code for the Jonkor language, spoken in Chad

== See also ==
- Choe Je-u (1824–1864), Korean religious leader
- Félicité Du Jeu, French actress
- Jeux, a ballet written by Claude Debussy
