= Richard Griffin (sailor) =

United States Virgin Islands sailor

Personal information
- Full name: Richard B. Griffin
- Nationality: American Virgin Islander
- Born: June 20, 1935 (age 89)

Sport
- Sport: Sailing

Richard B. Griffin (born June 20, 1935) is a sailor who represented the United States Virgin Islands. He competed in the Finn event at the 1972 Summer Olympics.
