= Paul Hiles =

Bermudian sailor

Personal information
- Nationality: Bermudian
- Born: 13 November 1948 (age 77)

Sport
- Sport: Sailing

Paul Hiles (born 13 November 1948) is a Bermudian sailor. He competed in the Finn event at the 1972 Summer Olympics.
