= Kees Douze =

Dutch sailor (1939–2011)

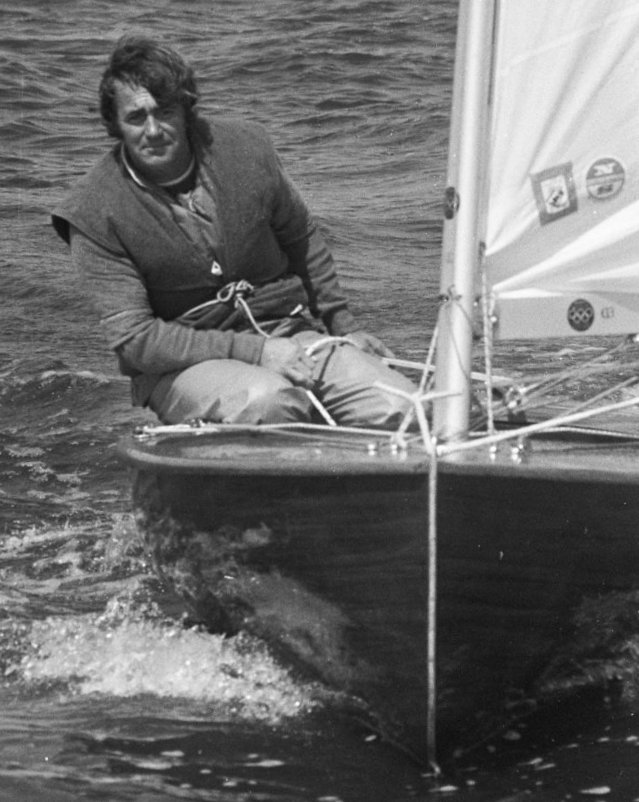
- Cees Douze during the 1972 European Finn Championship on the IJsselmeer. (Nationaal Archief, Den Haag)

Personal information
- Full name: Jan Cornelis Douze
- Nationality: Dutch
- Born: 30 March 1939 Utrecht
- Died: 24 February 2011 (aged 71) Bilthoven
- Height: 1.86 m (6.1 ft)

Sailing career
- Sport: Sailing
- Club: Watersport Vereniging; Het Witte Huis
- Classes: 12 foot dinghy Finn; Star
- Updated on 19 January 2014

Jan Cornelis "Kees" Douze" (30 March 1939 in Utrecht – 24 February 2011 in Bilthoven) was a sailor from the Netherlands, who represented his native country at the 1972 Summer Olympics in Kiel, Germany. Kees took the 23rd place in the Finn. Later he specialized in the Star, Dutch national classes as well at the 12 foot dinghy. In 1980 Douze returned to the Olympics as substitute helmsman for the Dutch Star.

== Controversy ==
Several countries did boycott the 1980 Summer Olympics, others like France did not go since they found the competition devaluated. As result only half of the expected fleet was present during the Olympic regattas.

== Sources ==
- "Kees Douze Bio, Stats, and Results". Olympic Sports. Sports-Reference.com. Archived from the original on 2020-04-18.
- "OS-zeilers" (in Dutch). Het vrĳe volk : democratisch-socialistisch dagblad. 1972-06-22.
- "GOED WERK VAN ZEILERS IN KIEL" (in Dutch). Leeuwarder courant : hoofdblad van Friesland. 1972-08-31.
- "Topzeilers vallen tegen" (in Dutch). De tĳd : dagblad voor Nederland. 1972-09-13.
- "The official report of the Organizing Committee for the Games of the XXth Olympiad Munich 1972, Volume 1 The organization" (PDF). Munich: proSport. 1974. Archived from the original (PDF) on February 2, 2014.
- "The official report of the Organizing Committee for the Games of the XXth Olympiad Munich 1972, Volume 2 The constructions" (PDF). Munich: proSport. 1974. Archived from the original (PDF) on 2014-02-02.
- "The official report of the Organizing Committee for the Games of the XXth Olympiad Munich 1972, Volume 3 The competitions" (PDF). Munich: proSport. 1974. Archived from the original (PDF) on 2007-09-27.
- "Zeilers:, We gaan'" (in Dutch). De Telegraaf. 1980-05-16.
- "Zeilploeg bleef buiten de medailles" (in Dutch). De Telegraaf. 1980-07-30.
- "Staartjes: "Het heeft niet meegezeten" Geen medailles voor Nederlandse zeilers" (in Dutch). De waarheid. 1980-07-31.
- "Franse zeilploeg blijft thuis" (in Dutch). Amigoe. 1980-05-22.
- "Games of the XXII Olympiad, Volume I: Moscow, Tallinn, Leningrad, Kiev and Minsk" (PDF). Fizkultura i Sport Publishers. 1981. Archived from the original (PDF) on 2013-10-17.
- "Games of the XXII Olympiad, Volume II: Organisation" (PDF). Fizkultura i Sport Publishers. 1981. Archived from the original (PDF) on 2013-10-17.
- "Games of the XXII Olympiad, Volume III: Participants and Results" (PDF). Fizkultura i Sport Publishers. 1981. Archived from the original (PDF) on October 17, 2013.
