= John Clarke (sailor) =

Canadian sailor (1934–2022)

Personal information
- Nationality: Canadian
- Born: 19 October 1934 Hove, Brighton and Hove, England
- Died: 22 May 2022 (aged 87)

Sport
- Sport: Sailing

John Clarke (19 October 1934 – 22 May 2022) was a Canadian sailor. He competed in the Finn event at the 1972 Summer Olympics.
