= Patrick Pym =

British competitive sailor (1936–2019)

Personal information
- Nationality: British
- Born: 6 September 1936 Honiton, England
- Died: 4 December 2019 (aged 83)

Sport
- Sport: Sailing

Patrick Pym (6 September 1936 – 4 December 2019) was a British sailor. He competed in the Finn event at the 1972 Summer Olympics.

== Biography ==
Pym was born in Honiton, Devon in September 1936. In the 1950s, Pym began racing in 12 foot dinghy off the Devon coast, going on to become the national champion in the class.

Pym competed in the trials for the 1968 Summer Olympics in Mexico City. Despite a strong performance, he only made the reserve team for the Olympics.

He was a member of the Hamble River Sailing Club, with him being one of six club members selected for the 1972 Summer Olympics in Munich. At the 1972 Summer Olympics, Pym competed in the Finn event, where he finished in 18th place. In the seven races that made up the event, his best finish was a sixth place in race four, while he was disqualified in race five.

Following the 1968 Summer Olympics, Pym and David Hunt founded the company Needlespars. The company worked on the design of masts, which became the standard in the sport.

In 1975 Pym was Overall Winner of the ‘Round The Island Race’ in his quarter ton yacht ‘Needlework’.

In 1981 he Co-helmed Bryan Saffrey-Cooper’s ‘Dragon’ in the winning British Admiral’s Cup team (with ‘Victory’ and ‘Yeoman XXIII’).

In 1982 Pym helmed ‘Rakau’ (owned by Martin Lowson and Brian Ferris) which won RORC ‘Yacht of the Year’. In 1983 ‘Rakau’ was Fastnet Class Winner.

Pym died in December 2019 at the age of 83.
