= Ilias Hatzipavlis =

Greek sailor

Medal record

Sailing

Representing Greece

Olympic Games
Silver medal – second place	1972 Munich	Finn class

Ilias Hatzipavlis (Greek: Ηλίας Χατζηπαυλής, born 24 May 1949) is a Greek sailor. He won a silver medal in the Finn class at the 1972 Summer Olympics. He was named one of the 1972 Greek Athletes of the Year.
