= Tehmasp Rustom Mogul =

Indian sailor

Personal information
- Nationality: Indian
- Born: 19 February 1938 (age 87)

Sport
- Sport: Sailing

Tehmasp Rustom Mogul (born 19 February 1938) is an Indian sailor. He competed in the Finn event at the 1972 Summer Olympics.
