= Walter Bachmann =

Swiss sailor (born 1949)

Personal information
- Nationality: Swiss
- Born: 10 May 1949 (age 75)

Sport
- Sport: Sailing

Walter Bachmann (born 10 May 1949) is a Swiss sailor. He competed in the Finn event at the 1972 Summer Olympics.
