= Gerardo Seeliger =

Spanish sailor

Personal information
- Nationality: Spanish
- Born: 6 September 1947 (age 77); Madrid, Spain

Sport
- Sport: Sailing

Gerardo Seeliger (born 6 September 1947) is a Spanish sailor. He competed in the Finn event at the 1972 Summer Olympics.
