= Roberto Colliard =

Mexican sailor (born 1953)

Personal information
- Nationality: Mexican
- Born: 8 January 1953 (age 72)

Sport
- Sport: Sailing

Roberto Colliard (born 8 January 1953) is a Mexican sailor. He competed in the Finn event at the 1972 Summer Olympics.
