= Ed Bennett (sailor) =

American sailor (1937–2018)

Personal information
- Born: December 20, 1937 Oakland, California, United States
- Died: January 7, 2018 (aged 80) Vista, California, United States

Sport
- Sport: Sailing

Ed Bennett (December 20, 1937 – January 7, 2018) was an American sailor. He competed in the Finn event at the 1972 Summer Olympics.
