= Roberto Haas =

Argentine sailor

Personal information
- Nationality: Argentine
- Born: 22 January 1946 (age 79)

Sport
- Sport: Sailing

Roberto Haas (born 22 January 1946) is an Argentine sailor. He competed in the Finn event at the 1972 Summer Olympics.
