= Bret de Thier =

New Zealand sailor

Personal information
- Full name: Bret Geoffrey de Thier
- Born: 14 June 1945 (age 79); Christchurch, New Zealand

Sport
- Country: New Zealand
- Sport: Sailing

Bret Geoffrey de Thier (born 14 June 1945) is a New Zealand sailor. He competed in the Finn event at the 1972 Summer Olympics.
