= Kim Weber =

Finnish sailor (1945–2022)

Personal information
- Nationality: Finnish
- Born: 21 October 1945; Helsinki, Finland
- Died: 25 June 2022 (aged 76)

Sport
- Sport: Sailing

Kim Weber (21 October 1945 – 25 June 2022) was a Finnish sailor. He competed in the Finn event at the 1972 Summer Olympics.
