= María Escribano =

María Escribano (24 January 1954 – 22 December 2002) was a Spanish composer and music teacher.

== Biography ==
María Escribano was born in Madrid, Spain. She studied piano and composition at the Royal Conservatory of Music in Madrid with Antón García Abril and Roman Alis. She continued her studies of contemporary music with composers Carmelo Bernaola, Cristobal Halffter and Tomas Marco, analysis with Rodolfo Halffter at the Festival de Granada, Mauricio Kagel and Ligeti Giorgy at Darmstadt and Cologne, Luis de Pablo in Madrid, Arturo Tamayo in Freiburg, and orchestration and composition with Leonardo Balada at Carnegie Mellon University in Pittsburgh, USA. After completing her studies, she lived in Avila and worked as a composer and music educator.

In 1978 she received a scholarship to create the Foundation Juan March, and became composer-in-residence for three years at the Roy Hart Theatre Company in France, where she also worked as pianist and actress. She collaborated with pianist, musicologist, and singer Ana Vega-Toscano for the Spell of Robin Hood and directed Creation Center AGAD in Arenas de San Pedro, Ávila, with actor and director Manuel Azquinezer.

Escribano was active as a music teacher, and created "The Garden of Music" in Madrid at the Centre El Ardal for children from three to sixteen, especially aiming to increase improvisation and composition skills. She also operated a music program for children aged 18 months to three years. Escribano died in Madrid.

== Works ==
Selected works include:

- Habanera Del Agua
- Mujer De Aguas Dulces
- Paradisi porta, choral, vocal
- "L'histoire d'un art", play, piano, chorus and actors

=== Discography ===
Escribano's compositions were recorded and issued on disc, including:

- Voces de una tradición, Maria Escribano, 1983
- La Herencia Judia en España Maria Escribano and Maite Hernangomez 1992
- Stories and Songs of the Media Lunita, Antonio Rodríguez Almodóvar, published by Gateway and Editorial ANAYA, Castilian and Catalan.
- Women and Music, (No. 3 of the pianist Susana Marín and No. 12 Madrid composer)
- Spell of Robin Hood, including 7 works for solo piano and piano and electroacoustic.
