= William Geimer =

American lawyer (1937–2002)

William W. Geimer (August 18, 1937 – December 1, 2002) was an American lawyer, known for founding and leading The Jamestown Foundation from 1984 after his work with Soviet defector Arkady Shevchenko. He also "served on President Ronald Reagan's Export-Import Bank transition team, and in top-level positions in the Nixon and Ford administrations, including as deputy assistant secretary of state for international trade". He also had a private law practice in Washington, D.C., from 1976 to 1984.

== Recognition ==
Geimer was described as "a visionary" by Jamestown Foundation Board member and former Central Intelligence Agency director R. James Woolsey, and by Jamestown Foundation Advisory Board member Zbigniew Brzezinski as "a patriot with a vision, an idealist with a program, and a leader who knew how to get things done".

== Personal life ==
Geimer died on December 1, 2002. His funeral service was attended by then-Vice President Dick Cheney, who was also a Jamestown Foundation Board member.
