= George Karstens =

American football player (1924–2002)

No. 55
- Position: Center

Personal information
- Born: February 9, 1924; Chicago, Illinois, U.S.
- Died: December 5, 2002 (aged 78); Bradenton, Florida, U.S.
- Listed height: 6 ft 4 in (1.93 m)
- Listed weight: 205 lb (93 kg)

Career information
- High school: Austin (Chicago)
- College: Indiana
- NFL draft: 1949: undrafted

Career history
- Detroit Lions (1949)

Career NFL statistics
- Games played: 2
- Stats at Pro Football Reference

George Jacob Karstens Jr. (February 9, 1924 – December 5, 2002) was an American professional football player who was a center for one season in the National Football League (NFL) for the Detroit Lions. He played college football for the Indiana Hoosiers.

Karstens was born on February 9, 1924, in Chicago, Illinois. He attended Austin Community Academy High School there before playing college football at Indiana University Bloomington. He was the Hoosiers' starting center in most of his time with the team, earning three varsity letters.

After graduating, Karstens was signed by the Detroit Lions as an undrafted free agent following the 1949 NFL draft. He appeared in two games before being waived on October 12.

After his brief professional football career, Karstens was a long-time teacher and school principal in the Lyons and Stickney school districts. He also was a football coach and referee. He died on December 5, 2002, at the age of 78.
