= Kevin McLaverty =

Irish sailor

Personal information
- Nationality: Irish
- Born: 24 October 1936
- Died: 6 December 2002 (aged 66)

Sport
- Sport: Sailing

Kevin McLaverty (24 October 1936 – 6 December 2002) was an Irish sailor. He competed in the Finn event at the 1972 Summer Olympics.
