= Derek Miller (field hockey) =

British field hockey player

Personal information
- Born: 14 February 1936 Brentford, England
- Died: 23 December 2002 (aged 66) Surrey, England
- Height: 177 cm (5 ft 10 in)
- Weight: 71 kg (157 lb)

Sport
- Sport: Field hockey
Senior career
Years	Team	Caps	Goals
1958–1968	Old Kingstonians	-	-
National team
Years	Team	Caps	Goals
–	Great Britain		-
–	England		-

Derek Robert Miller (14 February 1936 – 23 December 2002) was a British field hockey player. He competed at the 1960 Summer Olympics and the 1964 Summer Olympics.

== Biography ==
Miller played club hockey for Old Kingstonians and represented Great Britain at the 1960 Olympic Games in Rome.

He appeared again for Great Britain at the 1964 Olympic Games in Tokyo.
