= Sailing at the 1972 Summer Olympics – Finn =

Finn at the Games of the XX Olympiad
- Line drawing of the Finn
- Venue: Kiel-Schilksee (Olympiazentrum)
- Dates: First race: 29 August 1972; Last race: 8 September 1972
- Competitors: 35 from 35 nations

Medalists
1st place, gold medalist(s)		Serge Maury	France
2nd place, silver medalist(s)		Ilias Hatzipavlis	Greece
3rd place, bronze medalist(s)		Viktor Potapov	Soviet Union

The Finn was a sailing event on the Sailing at the 1972 Summer Olympics program in Kiel-Schilksee. Seven races were scheduled and completed. 35 sailors, on 35 boats, from 35 nations competed.

== Race schedule ==
Due to the interruption of the Games on 6 September 1972, the race was postponed till 7 September. Then the race conditions were unsuitable. Heavy fog and poor wind conditions made it not possible to race until 8 September. Also the medal ceremony was also postponed until 8 September.

●	Event competitions	●	Event finals

Date	August						September										
Date	26th Sat	27th Sun	28th Mon	29th Tue	30th Wed	31st Thu	1st Fri	2nd Sat	3rd Sun	4th Mon	5th Tue	6th Wed	7th Thu	8th Fri	9th Sat	10th Sun	11th Mon
Finn (planning)				●	●	●	●	Spare day	Spare day	●	●	●	Spare day	Spare day			
Finn (actual)				●	●	●	●	Spare day	Spare day	●	●		Fog	●			

== Course area and course configuration ==
For the Finn course area C(harlie) was used. The location (54°27'30'’N, 10°17'450'’E) points to the center of the 1.5nm radius circle. The distance between mark 1 and 3 was about 1.5nm.

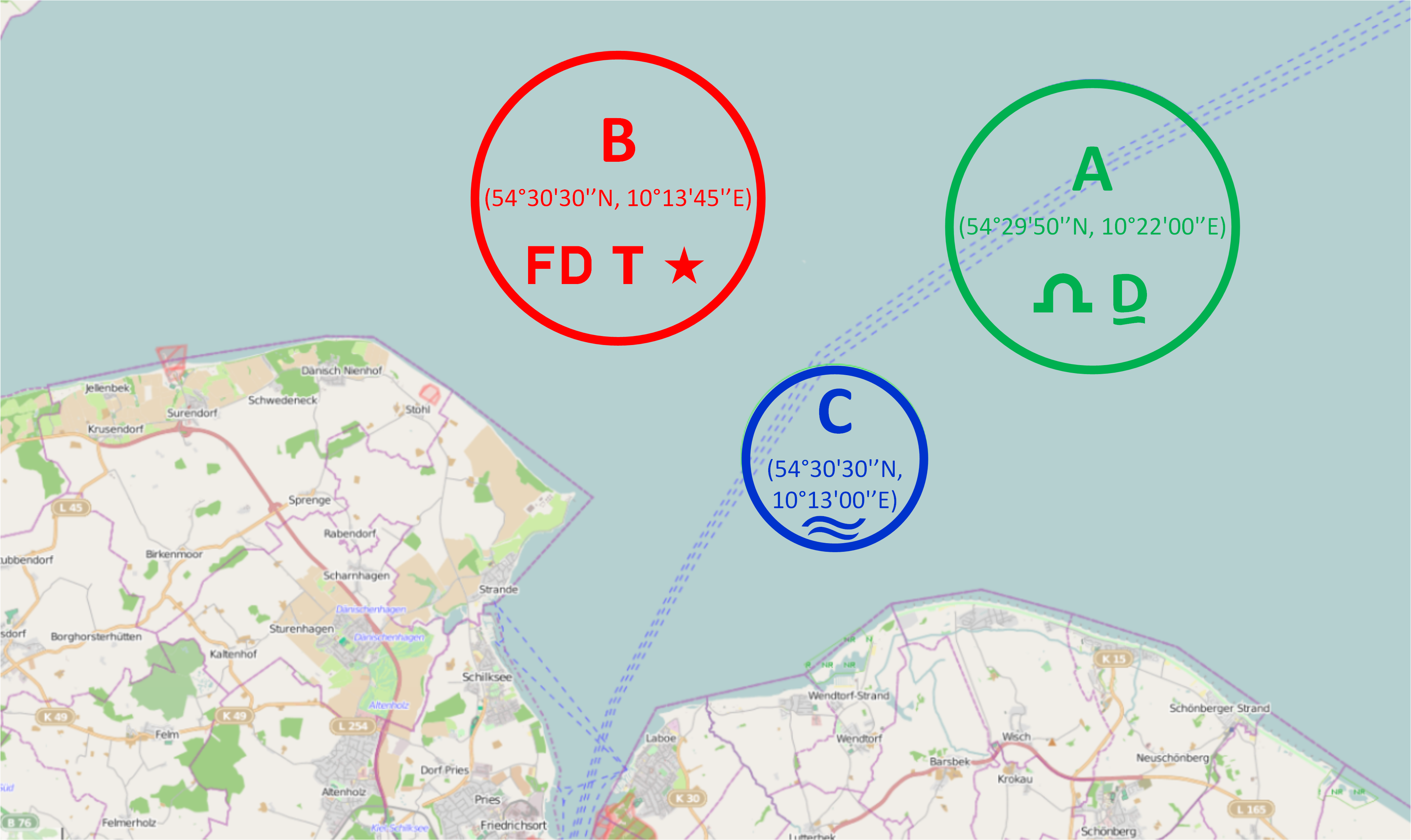

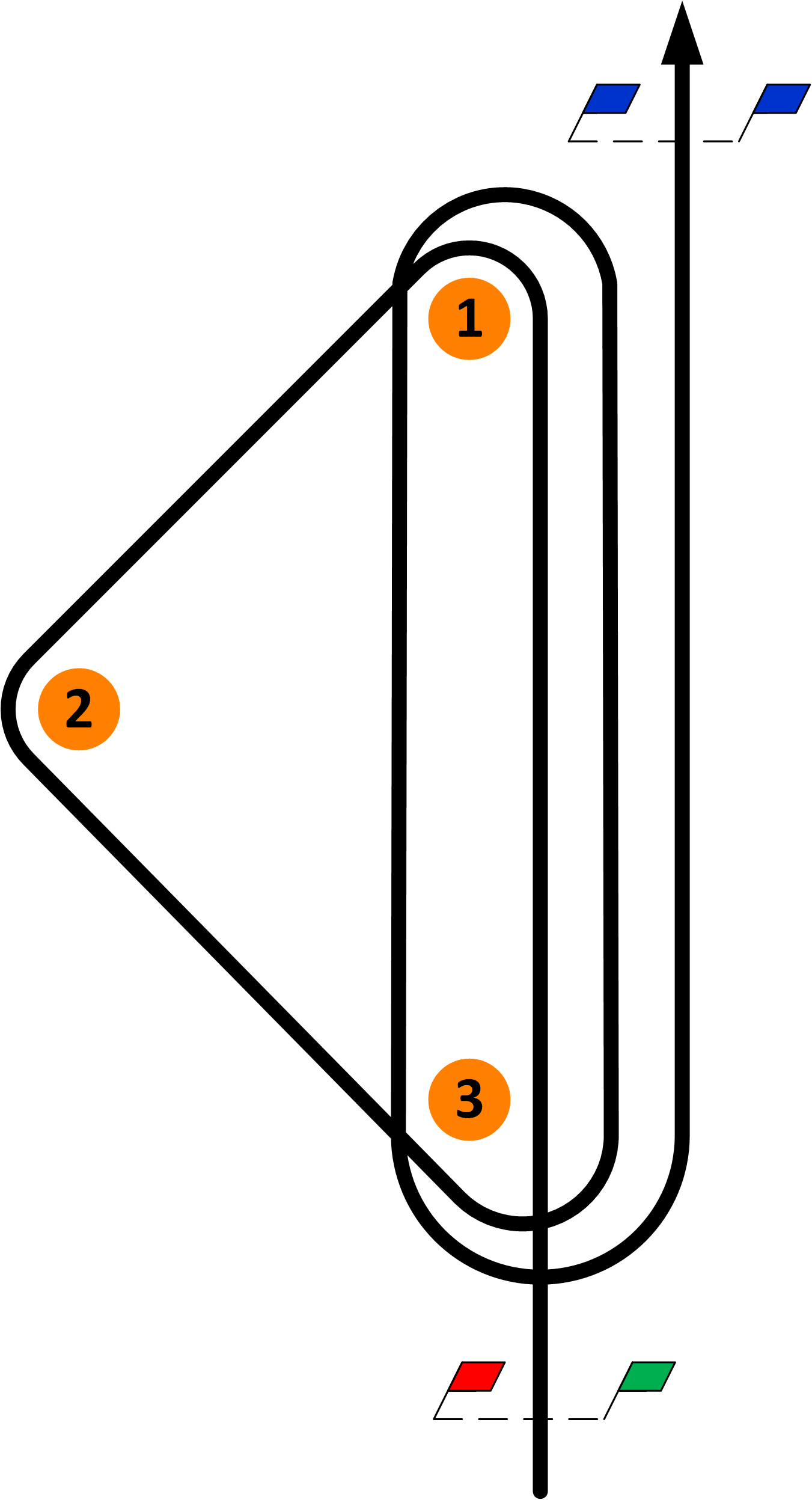

== Final results ==
Due to the time limit for finishing of half an hour after the winner and light air conditions, only three Finn sailors were able to finish in race six.

Rank	Country	Helmsman	Race 1		Race 2		Race 3		Race 4		Race 5		Race 6		Race 7		Total	Total – discard
Rank	Country	Helmsman	Pos.	Pts.	Pos.	Pts.	Pos.	Pts.	Pos.	Pts.	Pos.	Pts.	Pos.	Pts.	Pos.	Pts.	Total	Total – discard
1st place, gold medalist(s)	France	Serge Maury	1	0.0	8	14.0	11	17.0	~~26~~	~~32.0~~	10	16.0	2	3.0	4	8.0	90.0	58.0
2nd place, silver medalist(s)	Greece	Ilias Hatzipavlis	2	3.0	9	15.0	8	14.0	10	16.0	4	8.0	~~DNF~~	~~41.0~~	9	15.0	112.0	71.0
3rd place, bronze medalist(s)	Soviet Union	Viktor Potapov	5	10.0	1	0.0	2	3.0	23	29.0	15	21.0	~~DNF~~	~~41.0~~	6	11.7	115.7	74.7
4	Australia	John Bertrand	11	17.0	17	23.0	9	15.0	3	5.7	7	13.0	~~DNF~~	~~41.0~~	2	3.0	117.7	76.7
5	Sweden	Thomas Lundqvist	8	14.0	23	29.0	13	19.0	1	0.0	13	19.0	~~DNF~~	~~41.0~~	1	0.0	122.0	81.0
6	Finland	Kim Weber	4	8.0	~~29~~	~~35.0~~	4	8.0	24	30.0	18	24.0	3	5.7	5	10.0	120.7	85.7
7	East Germany	Christian Schröder	24	30.0	19	25.0	1	0.0	13	19.0	1	0.0	~~DSQ~~	~~45.0~~	11	17.0	136.0	91.0
8	Hungary	György Fináczy	7	13.0	5	10.0	21	27.0	18	24.0	14	20.0	1	0.0	~~23~~	~~29.0~~	121.0	94.0
9	Brazil	Cláudio Biekarck	14	20.0	13	19.0	23	29.0	16	22.0	10	16.0	~~DNF~~	~~41.0~~	3	5.7	146.7	105.7
10	New Zealand	Bret de Thier	9	15.0	6	11.7	15	21.0	2	3.0	27	33.0	~~DNF~~	~~41.0~~	20	26.0	150.7	109.7
11	Portugal	José Manuel Quina	6	11.7	4	8.0	5	10.0	29	35.0	16	22.0	~~DNF~~	~~41.0~~	17	23.0	132.7	109.7
12	West Germany	Walter Mai	18	24.0	3	5.7	20	26.0	4	8.0	24	30.0	~~DNF~~	~~41.0~~	12	18.0	152.7	111.7
13	Italy	Mauro Pelaschier	12	18.0	16	22.0	14	20.0	21	27.0	3	5.7	~~DNF~~	~~41.0~~	16	22.0	155.7	114.7
14	Belgium	Jacques Rogge	3	5.7	24	30.0	16	22.0	12	18.0	11	17.0	~~DNF~~	~~41.0~~	19	25.0	158.7	117.7
15	Bermuda	Paul Hiles	13	19.0	7	13.0	10	16.0	20	26.0	19	25.0	~~DNF~~	~~41.0~~	14	20.0	160.0	119.0
16	Czechoslovakia	Miroslav Vejvoda	20	26.0	25	31.0	12	18.0	15	21.0	2	3.0	~~DNF~~	~~41.0~~	18	24.0	164.0	123.0
17	Switzerland	Walter Bachmann	27	33.0	20	26.0	7	13.0	22	28.0	6	11.7	~~DNF~~	~~41.0~~	15	21.0	173.7	132.7
18	Great Britain	Patrick Pym	19	25.0	11	17.0	17	23.0	6	11.7	~~DSQ~~	~~45.0~~	DNF	41.0	10	16.0	178.7	133.7
19	Denmark	Steen Kjølhede	16	22.0	~~DSQ~~	~~45.0~~	3	5.7	17	23.0	14	20.0	DNF	41.0	25	31.0	181.7	136.7
20	Canada	John Clarke	28	34.0	22	28.0	22	28.0	8	14.0	17	23.0	~~DNF~~	~~41.0~~	8	14.0	182.0	141.0
21	Yugoslavia	Minski Fabris	15	21.0	28	34.0	29	35.0	19	25.0	12	18.0	~~DNF~~	~~41.0~~	7	13.0	187.0	146.0
22	United States	Ed Bennett	10	16.0	15	21.0	24	20.0	7	13.0	~~DNF~~	~~41.0~~	DNF	41.0	21	27.0	189.0	148.0
23	Netherlands	Kees Douze	32	38.0	2	3.0	28	34.0	11	17.0	25	31.0	~~DNF~~	~~41.0~~	24	30.0	194.0	153.0
24	Poland	Błażej Wyszkowski	25	31.0	21	27.0	27	33.0	5	10.0	20	26.0	~~DNF~~	~~41.0~~	26	32.0	200.0	159.0
25	Norway	Per Werenskiold	26	32.0	18	24.0	25	31.0	14	20.0	21	27.0	~~DNF~~	~~41.0~~	27	33.0	208.0	167.0
26	Puerto Rico	Lee Gentil	~~35~~	~~41.0~~	14	20.0	6	11.7	27	33.0	29	35.0	DNF	41.0	29	35.0	216.7	175.7
27	Japan	Kazuoki Matsuyama	22	28.0	12	18.0	~~DNF~~	~~41.0~~	31	37.0	9	15.0	DNF	41.0	31	37.0	217.0	176.0
28	Spain	Gerardo Seeliger	30	36.0	27	33.0	33	39.0	9	15.0	31	37.0	~~DNF~~	~~41.0~~	13	19.0	220.0	179.0
29	Virgin Islands	Richard Griffin	17	23.0	26	32.0	18	24.0	30	36.0	22	28.0	~~DNF~~	~~41.0~~	30	36.0	220.0	179.0
30	Mexico	Roberto Colliard	21	27.0	10	16.0	26	22.0	32	38.0	~~DSQ~~	~~45.0~~	DNF	41.0	31	37.0	237.0	192.0
31	Ireland	Kevin McLaverty	29	35.0	32	38.0	31	37.0	25	31.0	28	34.0	~~DNF~~	~~41.0~~	22	28.0	244.0	203.0
32	Argentina	Roberto Haas	23	29.0	31	37.0	~~DNF~~	~~41.0~~	28	34.0	23	29.0	DNF	41.0	28	34.0	245.0	204.0
33	Thailand	Rachot Kanjanavanit	33	39.0	30	36.0	19	25.0	~~DNF~~	~~41.0~~	26	32.0	DNF	41.0	DNF	41.0	255.0	214.0
34	India	Tehmasp Rustom Mogul	31	37.0	34	40.0	30	35.0	~~DNF~~	~~41.0~~	30	36.0	DNF	41.0	34	40.0	271.0	230.0
35	Republic of China	Chen Shiu-Hsiung	34	40.0	33	39.0	32	38.0	~~DNF~~	~~41.0~~	32	38.0	DNF	41.0	33	39.0	276.0	235.0

Legend: DNF – Did not finish; DSQ – Disqualified;
Discard is crossed out and does not count for the overall result.
Gender: – male; – female;

== Daily standings ==
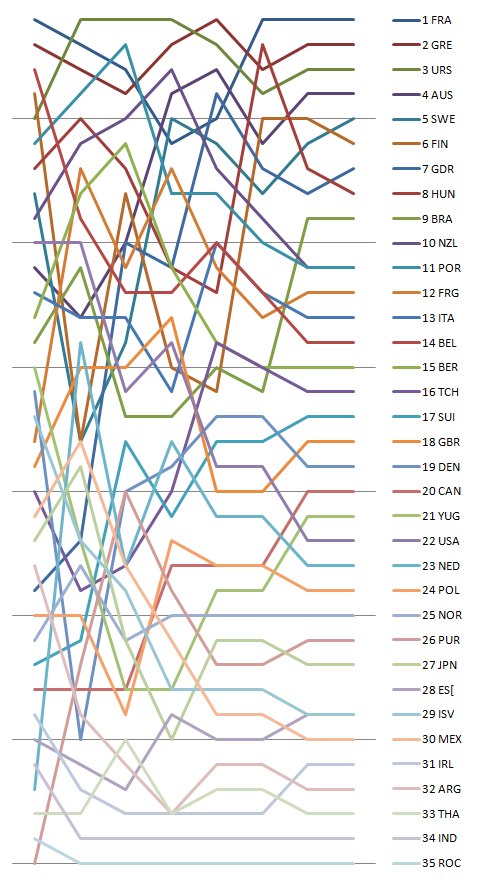
Graph showing the daily standings in the Finn during the 1972 Summer Olympics
