= Ivo Vesely =

Australian ice hockey player

Personal information
- Nationality: Australian
- Born: 1 April 1926; Prague, Czechoslovakia
- Died: 4 December 2002 (aged 76); Melbourne, Australia

Sport
- Sport: Ice hockey

Ivo Bohumil Vesely (1 April 1926 – 4 December 2002) was an Australian ice hockey player. He competed in the men's tournament at the 1960 Winter Olympics.
