= Ib Bengtsson =

Danish footballer (1927–2002)

Personal information
- Full name: Ib Folmer Bengtsson
- Date of birth: 27 May 1927
- Place of birth: Copenhagen, Denmark
- Date of death: 14 December 2002 (aged 75)
- Place of death: Vallensbæk, Denmark
- Position: Midfielder

Senior career*
Years	Team	Apps	(Gls)
1945–1957	Frem	208	(?)

International career
1949–1950	Denmark	3	(0)
- * Club domestic league appearances and goals

Ib Folmer Bengtsson (27 May 1927 – 14 December 2002) was a Danish footballer who played as a midfielder. He played in three matches for the Denmark national football team from 1949 to 1950.

== Career ==
A one-club man, Bengtsson made 208 appearances for Frem between 1945 and 1957.

Bengtsson made his debut for the Denmark national team on 11 September 1949 in a Nordic Football Championship match against Finland. He gained a total of three caps for the national team.
