= Ray Monaco =

American football player (1918–2002)

No. 13
- Position: Guard

Personal information
- Born: February 10, 1918; Providence, Rhode Island, U.S.
- Died: December 7, 2002 (aged 84); North Providence, Rhode Island, U.S.
- Listed height: 5 ft 10 in (1.78 m)
- Listed weight: 212 lb (96 kg)

Career information
- High school: Providence (RI) Central
- College: Holy Cross

Career history
- Washington Redskins (1944); Cleveland Rams (1945)

Awards and highlights
- NFL champion (1945)
- Stats at Pro Football Reference

Raymond William Monaco (February 10, 1918 – December 7, 2002) was an American football guard in the National Football League (NFL) for the Washington Redskins and the Cleveland Rams. He attended Holy Cross.
