= Jeu van Bun =

Dutch footballer (1918–2002)

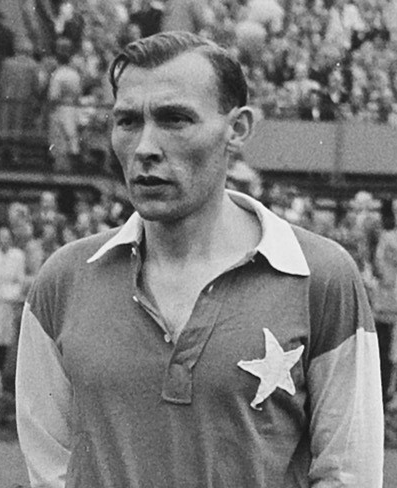
- Van Bun with MVV in 1951

Personal information
- Full name: Johannes Wijbrandus Mathias van Bun
- Date of birth: 10 December 1918
- Place of birth: Maastricht, Netherlands
- Date of death: 21 December 2002 (aged 84)
- Place of death: Maastricht, Netherlands
- Position: Right-back

Senior career*
| Years | Team | Apps | (Gls) |
| 1935–1954 | MVV | | |

International career
| 1947–1949 | Netherlands | 11 | (0) |
- * Club domestic league appearances and goals

Johannes Wijbrandus Mathias "Jeu" van Bun (10 December 1918 – 21 December 2002) was a Dutch footballer who played as a right back for MVV Maastricht and the Netherlands national team. He competed in the men's tournament at the 1948 Summer Olympics.

Van Bun played football at the highest level in the Netherlands Football League Championship for nineteen years, mainly as a right back. He played seventeen years as unpaid amateur for MVV Maastricht. During his period at MVV, he gained eleven caps for the Netherlands national team between 1947 and 1949. In 1948, as a member of the national team, he took part at the 1948 Summer Olympics in London, where he was part of the team beating Ireland 3–1 in the preliminary round.

Jeu retired from football in the 1953–54 season. After his career as a football player, he was active as a football coach at various Limburg amateur clubs. His nephew, also named Jeu van Bun, played for MVV between 1956 and 1960 and also appeared for Willem II and Sparta Rotterdam.
