= Emigration from the Eastern Bloc =

Movements of people during the Cold War

- Part of the Cold War
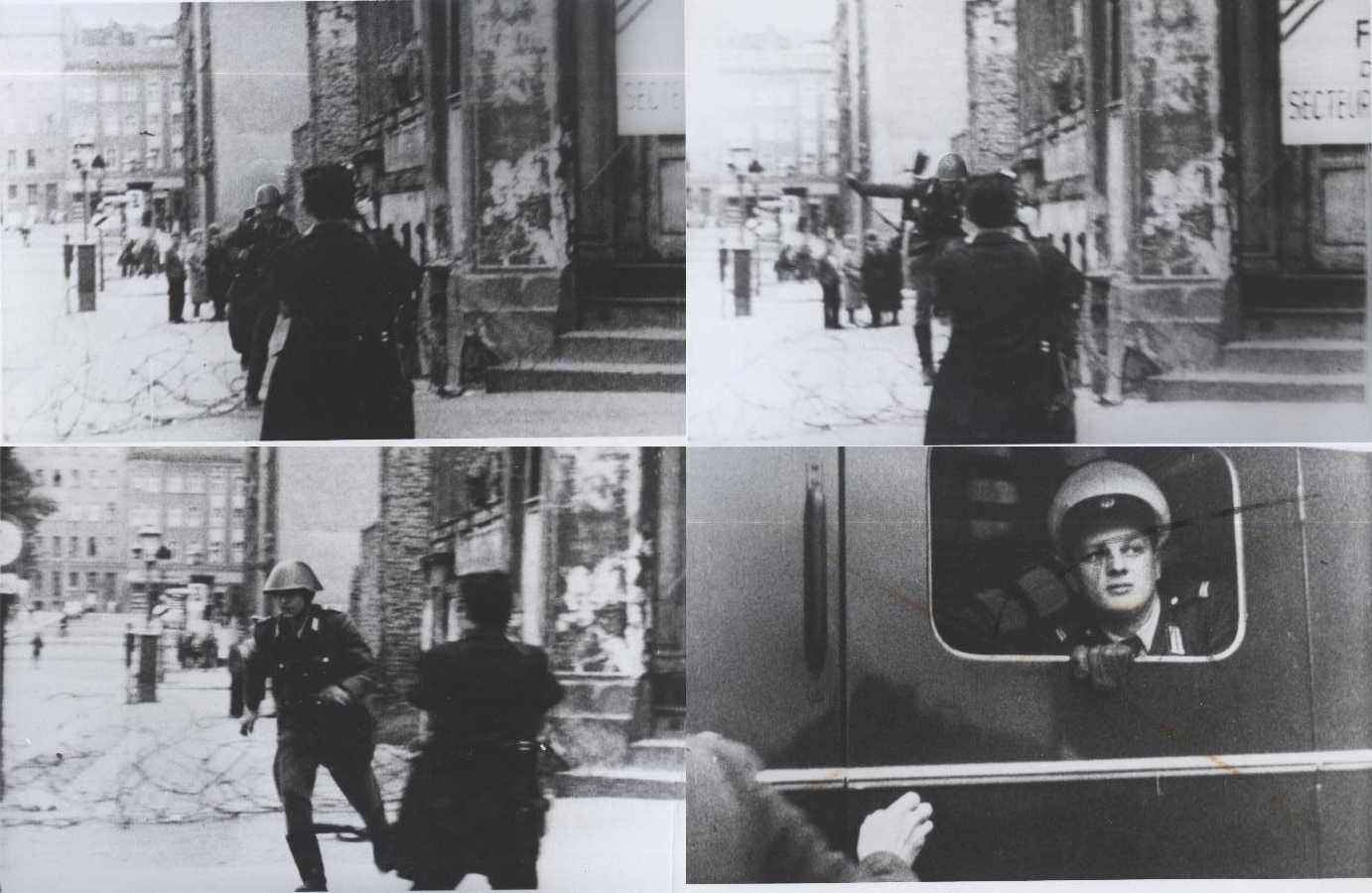
- Konrad Schumann leaping over barbed wire into West Berlin on 15 August 1961, three days after construction began on the Berlin Wall
- Date: 1945–1992
- Participants: Defectors from the Eastern Bloc
- Outcome: Brain drain in the Eastern Bloc; Implementation of border restrictions; Construction of the Berlin Wall

After World War II, emigration restrictions were imposed by countries in the Eastern Bloc, which consisted of the Soviet Union and its satellite states in Central and Eastern Europe. Legal emigration was in most cases only possible to reunite families or to allow members of minority ethnic groups to return to their homelands.

Eastern Bloc governments argued that strict limits to emigration were necessary to prevent a brain drain. The United States and Western European governments argued that they represented a violation of human rights. Despite the restrictions, defections to the West occurred.

After East Germany tightened its zonal occupation border with West Germany, the city sector border between East and West Berlins became a loophole, through which defection could occur. This was closed with the erection of the Berlin Wall in August 1961. Thereafter, emigration from the Eastern Bloc was effectively limited to illegal defections, ethnic emigration under bilateral agreements, and a small number of other cases.

== Background ==
=== Original USSR emigration restrictions ===
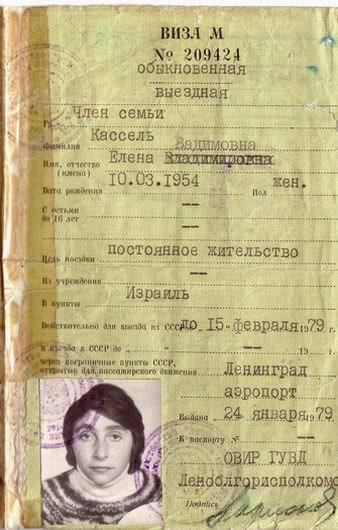
Rare Soviet "type 2" visa for permanent emigration

Although the first program of the Bolshevik movement in Russia included a demand for the "abolition of passports", just two months after the Russian Revolution of 1917, the new regime instituted passport controls and forbade the exit of belligerent nationals. The reasoning was partly that emigration was conflated with opposition to the socialist state and also the fear that emigration would inflate opposition armies. The 1918 Treaty of Brest-Litovsk obligated Russia to allow emigration of non-Russians who wanted German citizenship, but the regime attempted to reduce this flow by allowing it during only one month. Beginning in 1919, travel abroad required the approval of the NKVD, with the additional consent of the Special Department of the Cheka added in 1920. In 1922, after the Treaty on the Creation of the USSR, both the Ukrainian SSR and the Russian SFSR issued general rules for travel that foreclosed virtually all departures, making legal emigration all but impossible. However, the Soviet Union could not control its borders until a system of border guards was created through a special corps of the Gosudarstvennoye Politicheskoye Upravlenie (GPU), such that by 1928, even illegal departure was all but impossible.

In 1929 even more strict controls were introduced, decreeing that any Soviet official serving abroad who went over "to the camp of the enemies of the working class and the peasants" and refused to return would be executed within twenty-four hours of being apprehended. In 1932, as Stalin's first Five Year Plan forced collectivization, to allocate scarce housing and weed out "nonproductive" elements, internal passport controls were introduced. When combined with individual city Propiska ("place of residence") permits, and internal freedom of movement restrictions often called the 101st kilometre, these rules greatly restricted mobility within even small areas. When the Soviet Constitution of 1936 was promulgated, virtually no legal emigration took place, except for very limited family reunification and some forced deportations. Very small numbers snuck into Romania, Persia and Manchuria, but the bulk of the population remained essentially captive. Soviet emigration was never treated as a general right but as a limited privilege granted mainly to groups of the state considered "problematic" or heavily persecuted, particularly Soviet Jews. USSR only began allowing larger-scale emigration in 1971 because of both internal pressures from minorities seeking to leave and external pressure from Western governments demanding a more open policy. Also attempts to emigrate often triggered additional harassment and uncertainty from Soviet authorities, making the process itself a form of persecution. Moskovskaya Pravda later described the decision to emigrate as "unnatural and like burying someone alive." Those wishing to leave were viewed not just as deserters, but traitors.

The mobilization of labor in the Soviet Union was not feasible if emigration remained an option with the relative low standard of living that existed at that time. Soviet Premier Nikita Khrushchev later stated "We were scared, really scared. We were afraid the thaw might unleash a flood, which we wouldn't be able to control and which could drown us. How could it drown us? It could have overflowed the banks of the Soviet riverbed and formed a tidal wave that which would have washed away all the barriers and retaining walls of our society."

In addition emigration restrictions were used to keep secrecy about life in the Soviet Union. Starting in 1935, Joseph Stalin had already effectively sealed off outside access to the Soviet Socialist Republics (and until his death in 1953), effectively permitting no foreign travel inside the Soviet Union such that outsiders did not know of the political processes that had taken place therein. During this period, and until the late 1970s, 25 years after Stalin's death, the few diplomats and foreign correspondents that were permitted inside the Soviet Union were usually restricted to within a few kilometers of Moscow, while their phones were tapped, their residences were restricted to foreigner-only locations, and they were constantly followed by Soviet authorities. Dissenters who approached such foreigners were arrested. For many years after World War II, even the best informed foreigners did not know the number of arrested or executed Soviet citizens, or how poorly the Soviet economy had performed.

=== Creation of the Eastern Bloc ===
Map of Eastern Bloc countries in Central Europe

Bolsheviks took power in Russia following the Russian Revolution of 1917. During the Russian Civil War that followed, coinciding with the Red Army's entry into Minsk in 1919, Belarus was declared the Socialist Soviet Republic of Byelorussia. After more conflict, the Byelorussian Soviet Socialist Republic was declared in 1920. With the defeat of Ukraine in the Polish-Ukrainian War, after the March 1921 Peace of Riga following the Polish-Soviet War, central and eastern Ukraine were annexed into the Soviet Union as the Ukrainian Soviet Socialist Republic. In 1922, the Russian SFSR, Ukraine SSR, Byelorussian SSR and Transcaucasian SFSR were officially merged as republics creating the Union of Soviet Socialist Republics, or Soviet Union.

During the final stages of World War II, the Soviet Union began the creation of the Eastern Bloc by directly annexing several countries as Soviet Socialist Republics that were originally effectively ceded to it by Nazi Germany in the Molotov–Ribbentrop Pact.

These included Eastern Poland (incorporated into three different SSRs), Latvia (became Latvian SSR), Estonia (became Estonian SSR), Lithuania (became Lithuanian SSR), part of eastern Finland (became Karelo-Finnish SSR, and later merged into the Russian SFSR) and northern and eastern Romania (mainly Bessarabia, which became the Moldavian SSR). By 1945, these additional annexed countries totaled approximately 465,000 additional square kilometers (180,000 square miles), or slightly more than the area of West Germany, East Germany and Austria combined.

Other states were converted into Soviet Satellite states, such as: the People's Republic of Poland, the People's Republic of Hungary, the Czechoslovak Socialist Republic, the Romanian People's Republic, the People's Republic of Albania and, later, East Germany from the Soviet zone of German occupation. The Federal People's Republic of Yugoslavia was also considered part of the Bloc, though a Tito–Stalin split occurred in 1948, followed by the formation of the Non-Aligned Movement.

=== Conditions in the Eastern Bloc ===
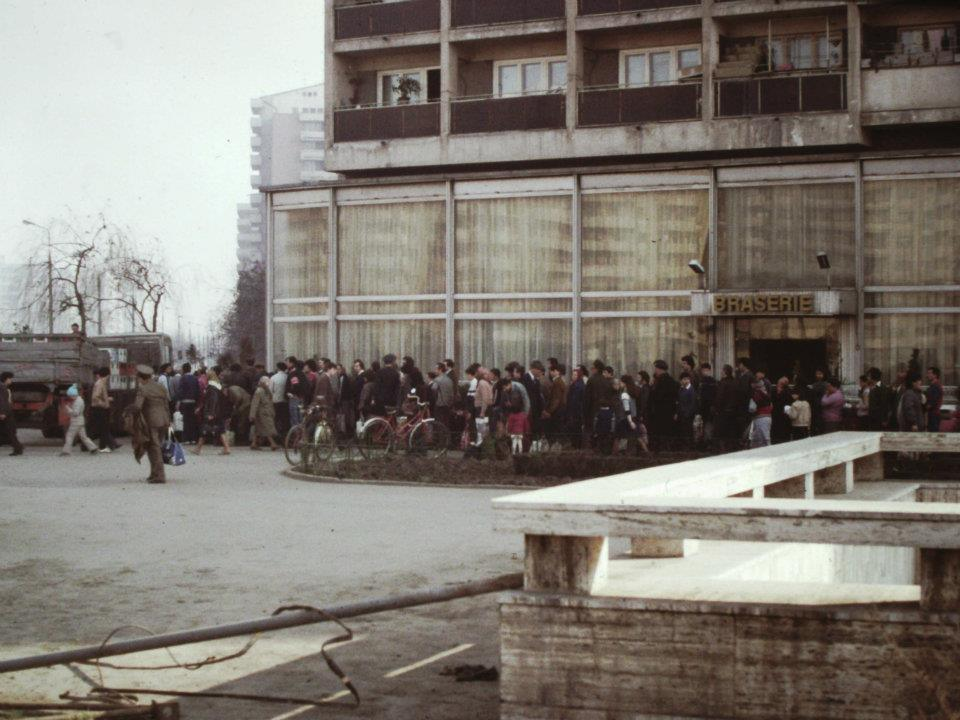
A line for the distribution of cooking oil in Bucharest, Romania in May 1986

Throughout the Eastern Bloc, both in the Soviet Union and the rest of the Bloc, the Russian SFSR was given prominence, and referred to as the naibolee vydajuščajasja nacija (the most prominent nation) and the rukovodjaščij narod (the leading people). The Soviets promoted the reverence of Russian actions and characteristics, and the construction of Soviet Communist structural hierarchies in the other countries of the Eastern Bloc.

The defining characteristic of communism implemented in the Eastern Bloc was the unique symbiosis of the state with society and the economy, resulting in politics and economics losing their distinctive features as autonomous and distinguishable spheres. Initially, Stalin directed systems that rejected Western institutional characteristics of market economies, democratic governance (dubbed "bourgeois democracy" in Soviet parlance) and the rule of law subduing discretional intervention by the state. The Soviets mandated expropriation and estatization of private property.

The Soviet-style "replica regimes" that arose in the Bloc not only reproduced the Soviet command economy, but also adopted the brutal methods employed by Joseph Stalin and Soviet secret police to suppress real and potential opposition. Communist regimes in the Eastern Bloc saw even marginal groups of opposition intellectuals as a potential threat because of the bases underlying Communist power therein. The suppression of dissidence and opposition was a central prerequisite for the security of Communist power within the Eastern Bloc, though the degree of opposition and dissident suppression varied by country and time throughout the Bloc.

In addition, media in the Eastern Bloc served as an organ of the state, completely reliant on, and subservient to, the ruling Communist parties, with radio and television organizations being state-owned, while print media was usually owned by political organizations, mostly by the ruling Communist party. Furthermore, the Eastern Bloc experienced economic mis-development by central planners resulting in those countries following a path of extensive rather than intensive development, and lagged far behind their western European counterparts in per capita Gross Domestic Product. Empty shelves in shops even in East Germany provided an open reminder of the inaccuracy of propaganda regarding purported magnificent and uninterrupted economic progress.

== History ==
=== Fleeing and expelled ethnic Germans in the Eastern Bloc ===
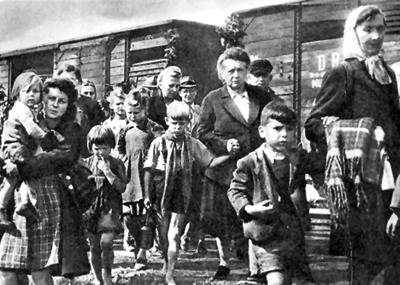
Sudeten Germans expelled after World War II

At the end of, and following World War II, at least twelve million ethnic German Volksdeutsche or Reichsdeutsche fled or were expelled, Barbara Marshall estimates that the number of ethnic Germans fleeing or expelled from the Eastern Bloc was "about fifteen million." mostly in and from Soviet-occupied territories becoming the Eastern Bloc, making it the largest movement of any European people in modern history. The expulsions had been agreed upon before the end of the war by the Allies. At least two million people perished due to flight and expulsion, 400,000 to 600,000 of whom by physical force. Almost all of these occurred between 1944 and 1948. The total figures include a considerable exodus of Germans from areas near the front lines as the Red Army advanced towards German-settled areas. Many were aware of the Soviet reprisals on German civilians, such as Soviet soldiers committing rape and other crimes. News of these atrocities, like the Nemmersdorf massacre, were also, in part, exaggerated and spread by the Nazi propaganda machine. Many of these ethnic Germans also fled to the future East Germany, within the Eastern Bloc.

=== Post-war free emigration ===
After Soviet occupation of Eastern Europe at the end of World War II, the majority of people living in the newly acquired areas aspired for independence and wanted the Soviet troops to leave. While millions of ethnic Germans fled or were expelled from Eastern Europe, about four million ethnic Germans were prevented from leaving by advancing Soviet troops or deported to remote areas of the Soviet Union as part of Stalin's policy towards the German population.

Through the late 1940s, it was possible to fly from Prague or Warsaw to elsewhere in Europe. The only rigid barrier was between Yugoslavia and Greece. Before 1950, over 15 million people emigrated from Soviet-occupied eastern European countries to the west in the five years immediately following World War II. Until the early 1950s, the lines between German occupation zones could be easily crossed. Taking advantage of this route, the number of Eastern Europeans applying for political asylum in West Germany was: 197,000 in 1950, 165,000 in 1951, 182,000 in 1952 and 331,000 in 1953. One reason for the sharp 1953 increase was fear of potential further Sovietization with the increasingly paranoid actions of Joseph Stalin in late 1952 and early 1953. 226,000 had fled in just the first six months of 1953. Because of the lack of resources and space in West Germany, at the request of Truman in 1952, the United States increased its resettlement admissions quotas under the United States Escapee Program (USEP). After the Hungarian Revolution of 1956, 171,000 Hungarian refugees crossed the border into Austria, while 20,000 crossed into Yugoslavia.

In 1948, in the debate of a Universal Declaration of Human Rights, the Soviets objected to the language that "everyone has the right to leave any country including his own." Arguing that "it would encourage emigration", the Soviets wanted to add the phrase "in accordance with the procedure laid down in the laws of that country", with only Poland and Saudi Arabia supporting the Soviet proposal.

=== Increasing transnational restrictions ===
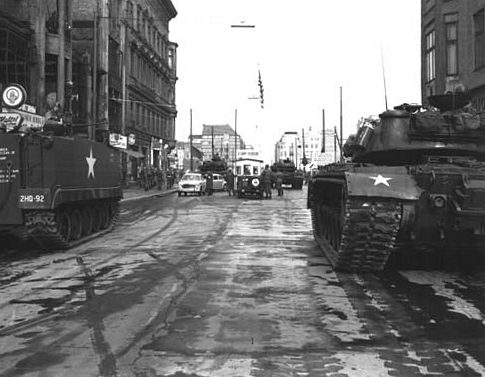
Soviet and American tanks at Checkpoint Charlie in 1961

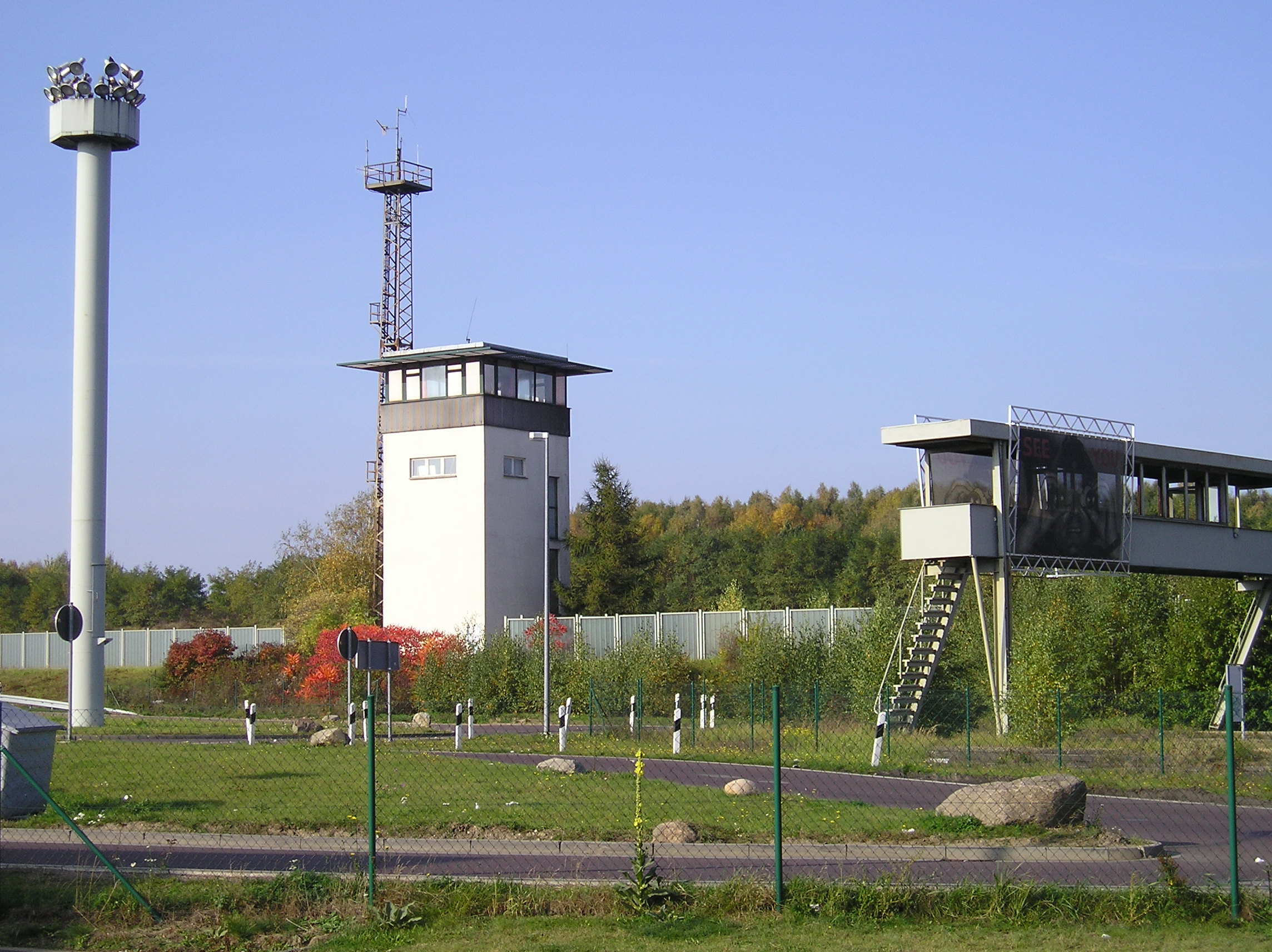
Helmstedt–Marienborn border crossing wall and guard tower

Eva Bánáthy greets her 11-year-old son László on 17 September 1956. When the Cold War closed the borders in 1948, László and his brother Béla were unable to rejoin their parents after they abandoned them to go to the United States. The boys' release from behind the Iron Curtain after nine years separation from their parents was the first time since the Cold War closed the borders that anyone under 65 years old had been allowed to leave Hungary to be reunited with family.

Up until 1952 the lines between Soviet-occupied eastern Germany and the western occupied zones could be easily crossed in most places. Accordingly, before 1961, most of that east–west flow took place between East and West Germanies, with over 3.5 million East Germans emigrating to West Germany before 1961, which comprised most of the total net emigration of 4 million emigrants from all of Central and Eastern Europe between 1950 and 1959. In response to growing numbers crossing the borders, the Soviet Union instituted tighter border controls around their zone, the Inner German border. In 1955, the Soviet Union passed a law transferring control over civilian access in Berlin to East Germany, which officially abdicated the Soviets from direct responsibility of matters therein, while passing control to a regime not recognized in the west. When large numbers of East Germans then defected under the guise of "visits", the new East German state essentially eliminated all travel to the west, in 1956. Soviet ambassador to East Germany Mikhail Pervukhin observed that "the presence in Berlin of an open and essentially uncontrolled border between the socialist and capitalist worlds unwittingly prompts the population to make a comparison between both parts of the city, which unfortunately, does not always turn out in favor of the Democratic [East] Berlin."

Restrictions implemented in the Eastern Bloc during the Cold War stopped most east–west migration, with only 13.3 million migrations westward between 1950 and 1990. By the early 1950s, the Soviet approach to controlling national movement was emulated by most of the rest of the Eastern Bloc (along with China, Mongolia and North Korea), with heavy restrictions preventing such emigration. A Hungarian economist stated that "it was quite obvious that the socialist countries—like other countries—intended to prevent their professionals, trained at the expense of their society, from being used to enrich other countries." Eastern European spokesmen maintained that they were keeping would-be emigrants from suffering from insufficient linguistic and cultural preparation. They also stressed the debt that individuals owed to socialist states, which offered care from birth, including subsidized education and training and, thus, they justified the emigration restrictions as an "education tax" with the states having a right to recoup its investment. Open emigration policies would create a "brain drain", forcing the state to readjust its wage structure at a cost to other economic priorities. Bulgarian and Romanian representatives had long argued that they could not afford to match western salaries and, without emigration restrictions, they "would become like Africa." The restrictions presented a quandary for some Eastern Bloc states that had been more economically advanced and open than the Soviet Union, such that crossing borders seemed more natural—especially between East and West Germanies where no prior border existed.

=== Unrestricted emigration from East Berlin ===
With the closing of the Inner German border officially in 1952, the city sector border in Berlin remained considerably more accessible than the rest of the border because it was administered by all four occupying powers. Accordingly, Berlin became the main route by which East Germans left for the West. East Germany introduced a new passport law on 11 December 1957, that reduced the overall number of refugees leaving East Germany, while drastically increasing the percentage of those leaving through West Berlin from 60% to well over 90% by the end of 1958. Those actually caught trying to leave East Berlin were subjected to heavy penalties, but with no physical barrier and even subway train access to West Berlin, such measures were ineffective. Accordingly, the Berlin sector border was essentially a "loophole", through which Eastern Bloc citizens could still escape. The 3.5 million East Germans that had left by 1961 totaled approximately 20% of the entire East German population.

=== "Brain drain" ===
The emigrants tended to be young and well educated, leading to the brain drain feared by officials in East Germany. Yuri Andropov, then the CPSU Director on Relations with Communist and Workers Parties of Socialist Countries wrote an urgent letter, on 28 August 1958, to the Central Committee about the significant 50% increase in the number of East German intelligentsia among the refugees. Andropov reported that, while the East German leadership stated that they were leaving for economic reasons, testimony from refugees indicated that the reasons were more political than material. He stated "the flight of the intelligentsia has reached a particularly critical phase." SED leader Walter Ulbricht saw not only a problem from "brain drain", but also the Grenzgänger problem of 50,000 East Berliners working in West Berlin. Rural citizens disaffected after collectivization campaigns also caused the flight of tens of thousands of farmers, including one third of the wealthier farmers, leaving over 10% of East Germany's arable land fallow and resulting in food shortages. The farmers that remained were disinclined to do more than produce for their own needs because fixed procurement prices meant little profit, and conspicuous production invited hasty inclusion in a collective or state farm. The exodus intensified existing shortages of goods and services in the shortage economy.

By 1960 the combination of World War II and the massive emigration westward left East Germany with only 61% of its population of working age, compared to 70.5% before the war. The loss was disproportionately heavy among professionals—engineers, technicians, physicians, teachers, lawyers and skilled workers. The direct cost of manpower losses has been estimated at $7 billion to $9 billion, with East German party leader Walter Ulbricht later claiming that West Germany owed him $17 billion in compensation, including reparations, as well as manpower losses. In addition, the drain of East Germany's young population potentially cost it over 22.5 billion East marks in lost educational investment. The brain drain of professionals had become so damaging to the political credibility and economic viability of East Germany that the re-securing of the Soviet imperial frontier was imperative. At the same time, there were positive consequences of the emigration for the East German regime, including the removal of anti-Russian nationalists and vocal opponents, which might have helped East Germany government to avoid some of the unrest that developed in Hungary, Poland and Czechoslovakia.

=== Construction of the Berlin Wall ===
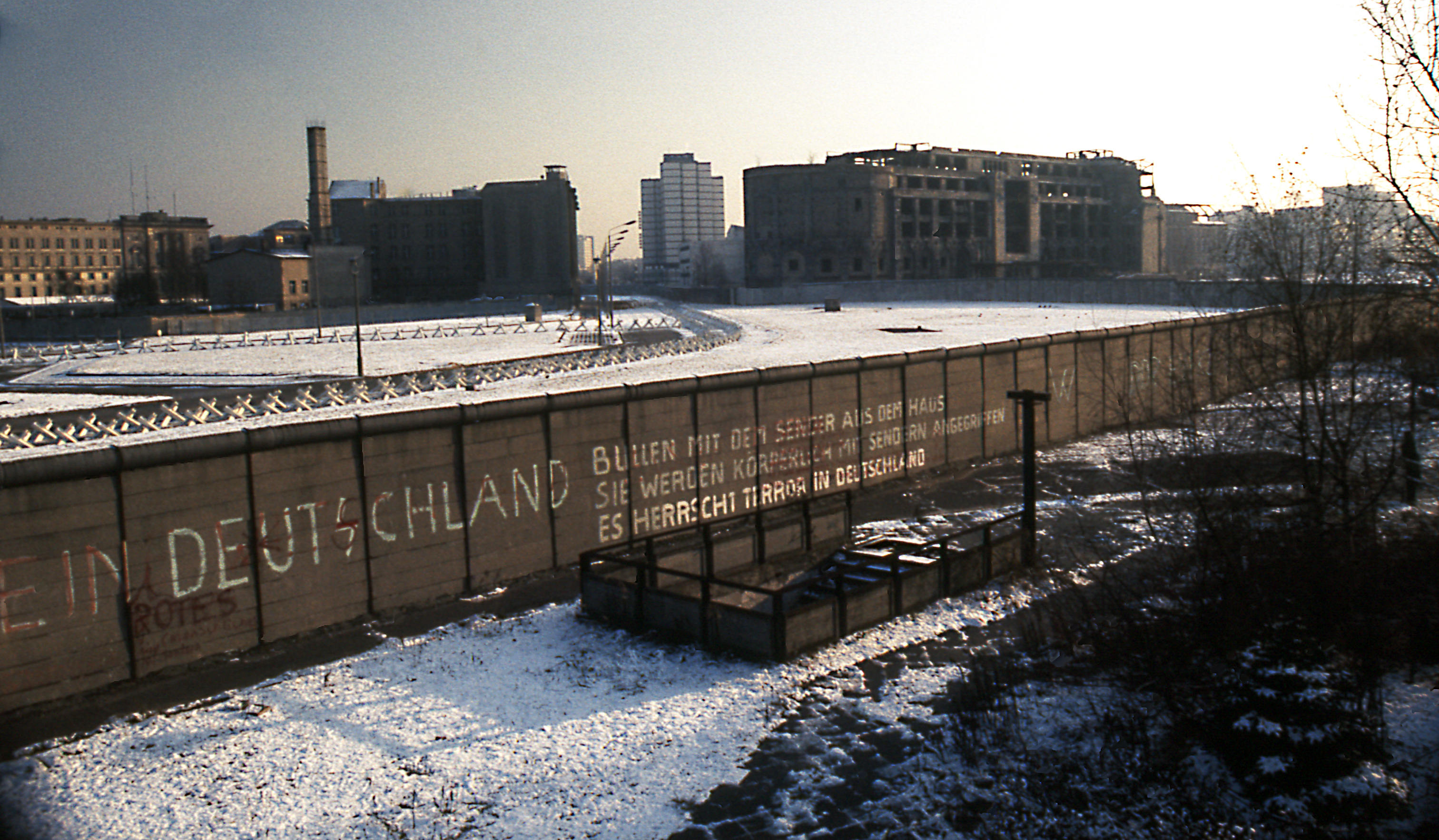
Berlin Wall 1975

The body of East German Peter Fechter lying next to the Berlin Wall, just after being shot in 1962 while trying to escape to the west

Even with the Inner German border strengthening, emigration through Berlin began to swell, with 144,000 in 1949, 199,000 in 1960 and 207,000 in the first seven months of 1961 alone. Orderly planning had become almost impossible in East Germany, with entire towns existing without physicians, crops going unharvested and 55-year-olds put to work running street cars. The East German economy was on the verge of collapse. With fears of drastic action in Berlin, on 15 July 1961 Ulbricht called a rare press conference, insisting that "no one has any intention of building a wall", but made clear that "the outflow has to stop." He added "it goes without saying that the so-called refugee camps in West Berlin"—the transit camps at which refugees were processed en route from West Berlin to West Germany—"will be closed down."

On 13 August 1961, a barbed-wire barrier that would become the Berlin Wall separating East and West Berlins was erected by East Germany. Two days later, police and army engineers began to construct a more permanent concrete wall. The construction briefly caused fears of a military crisis, though only 11,000 western troops were located in Berlin compared to 500,000 Soviet troops surrounding them deployed in East Germany. The completion of the Berlin Wall closed the biggest loophole in the Iron Curtain. It brought an end to a decade during which divided capital of the divided Germany was the easiest place for unauthorized east-to-west crossings. Along with the wall, the 1,340 kilometres (830 mi) zonal border became 5.5 kilometres (3.5 mi) wide on its East German side in some parts of Germany with a tall steel-mesh fence running along a "death strip" bordered by bands of plowed earth, to slow and to reveal the prints of those trying to escape, and mined fields.

=== Later restrictions and agreements ===
Thereafter, only 5,000 crossed the Berlin Wall between 1961 and 1989. Consequently, after the erection of the Wall, the total net emigration from Central and Eastern Europe fell even further to 1.9 million between 1960 and 1969 and 1.1 million between 1970 and 1979. This increased somewhat to 2.3 million between 1980 and 1989 with increased ethnic emigration after Mikhail Gorbachev came to power in the mid-1980s. More than 75% of those emigrating from Eastern Bloc countries between 1950 and 1990 did so under bilateral agreements for "ethnic migration", and religious minorities, such as those from Bulgaria (ethnic Turks and other Muslims), Poland (ethnic Germans, ethnic Hungarians, and ethnic Jews), Romania (ethnic Germans, ethnic Jews), and Yugoslavia (ethnic Turks and other Muslims). Most Soviets allowed to leave during this time period were ethnic Jews permitted to immigrate to Israel after a series of embarrassing defections in 1970 caused the Soviets to open very limited ethnic emigrations. About 10% of emigrants were refugee migrants under the Geneva Convention of 1951. Emigration from Eastern Bloc countries was as follows:

Emigration from Eastern Bloc countries through 1982

| Country | Total | % of Pop | Notes |
|---|---|---|---|
| Albania | Under 1,000 | 0.0% | 1946–1982; no emigration |
| Bulgaria | 431,000 | 5.3% | 1946–1982; 300,000 ethnic Turks to Turkey |
| Czechoslovakia | 1,973,000 | 14.0% | 1946–1982; 1.57 million Germans expelled in 1946 and 200,000 Czechs and Slovaks fled during the 1968 Soviet invasion |
| East Germany | 3,365,000 | 19.8% | 1948–1982; almost all before Berlin Wall in 1961 |
| Hungary | 332,000 | 3.3% | 1946–1982; 200,000 fled during Hungarian Revolution of 1956 |
| Poland | 1,877,000 | 6.0% | 1946–1982; 1.3 million Aussiedler (German origin through East German program) |
| Romania | 424,000 | 2.2% | 1946–1982; many were Aussiedler (ethnic Germans) |
| Soviet Union | 500,000 | 0.2% | 1948–1982; All ethnic Jews, Germans and Armenians; other emigration impossible except for ethnic and familial |

Albania's tight security allowed almost no emigration, while almost all of East Germany's emigration took place before the erection of the Berlin Wall. Because of East Germany's cultural affinity with West Germany and the viewing of West German television depicting western life throughout most of East Germany, it was more prone to population loss.

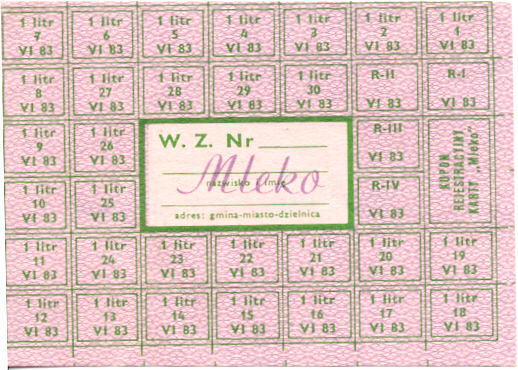
A ration card for milk from 1983 from the People's Republic of Poland

Providing further emigration pressure was the growing gap in living standards between western Europe and the Eastern Bloc after the 1960s. Everyday complaints over consumer goods, supplies or wages could all too readily lead to comparisons with Western conditions. The quality of goods displayed by "aunts" and Intershops, where visitors would buy premium goods with foreign currency (see also Beryozka, Pewex, Tuzex and Corecom), heightened Easterners' sense of their second-class status and this, in turn, affected their perception of economic arrangements in their own country. Walter Freidrich, director of the Leipzig Institute, complained that "shortcomings and weaknesses in our own country (e.g., problems with supply of consumer goods and spare parts; media policy; rose tinted perspectives; real democratic participation, etc) are coming increasingly into focus and subjected to sharper criticisms. To a growing extent, doubt is cast on the superiority of socialism." Stasi reports complained about individuals who had been given privileged access to travel to the West for work with "stories of the 'overwhelming range of commodities available . . . or with reports of East German goods on sale there at knock-down prices."

Defection attempts from the Soviet Union were governed by two laws:

(i) illegal traveling abroad without a passport was a crime punishable by one to three years in prison, even in cases where the destination was another Eastern Bloc country; and

(ii) illegal defection to a non-Eastern Bloc state and refusal to return home was considered treason against the state.

To remove the temptation for such treason, the Soviets invested heavily in border controls, with lengthy criminal rules regarding approaching a border region. Almost no emigration occurred from the Soviet Union in the 1950s and 1960s, except for ethnic Armenians returning to Armenia. In 1973, the United States Congress made liberalizing the Soviet emigration policy a prerequisite for lifting trade barriers, resulting in the emigration of 370,000 Soviet citizens, mostly ethnic Jews. A second wave of emigration started in 1986–87, after Mikhail Gorbachev came to power, with most emigrants being ethnic Jews, ethnic Germans, Armenians, Greeks or Pentecostals.

Because of various international accords, non-Soviet Eastern Bloc countries did not explicitly ban emigration. Instead, they introduced a long series of bureaucratic approvals an applicant must obtain beyond the passport office—including local police, employers and the state housing commission—with no time limit set for action. Applications could be denied, without appeal, on a variety of subjective grounds, such as national security and "the interest of the state." Much was left to administrative discretion and unpublished internal directives, with the odds against eventually receiving after years of the process being extremely high. Like in the Soviet Union, attempting to leave without permissions to a non-Eastern Bloc state was punishable as treason, with Albania and Romania invoking the death penalty for such offenses. Even after families applied to leave to join refugees fleeing during the confusion of the Soviet invasion of Czechoslovakia in 1968, Czechoslovak authorities informed them "it is contrary to the State's interest to allow Czechoslovak citizens long-term private sojourns abroad, and that includes emigration. However, emigration was also used as a sort of release valve to hasten the departure of limited prominent vocal dissenters."

In 1964, Yugoslavia became the only communist country in Europe to allow its citizens to emigrate. Others qualified as refugees claiming to "escape" during crises, such as those fleeing during the Hungarian Revolution of 1956, the 1968 Soviet invasion of Czechoslovakia, the Polish Solidarity events and various events that occurred in East Germany, Bulgaria and Albania in the late 1980s.

=== 1975 Helsinki Accords and restrictive strategies ===
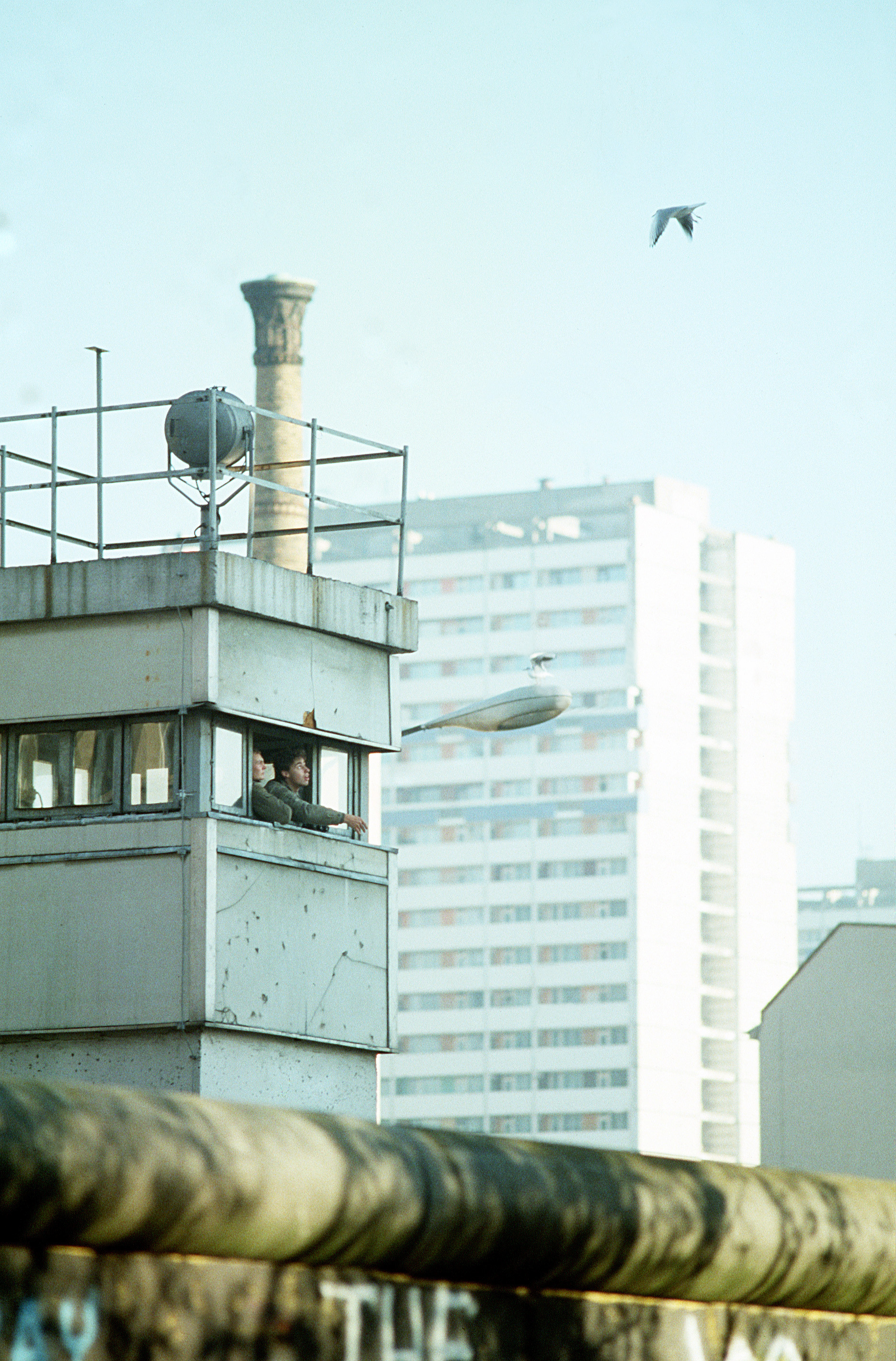
Berlin Wall top and guard tower

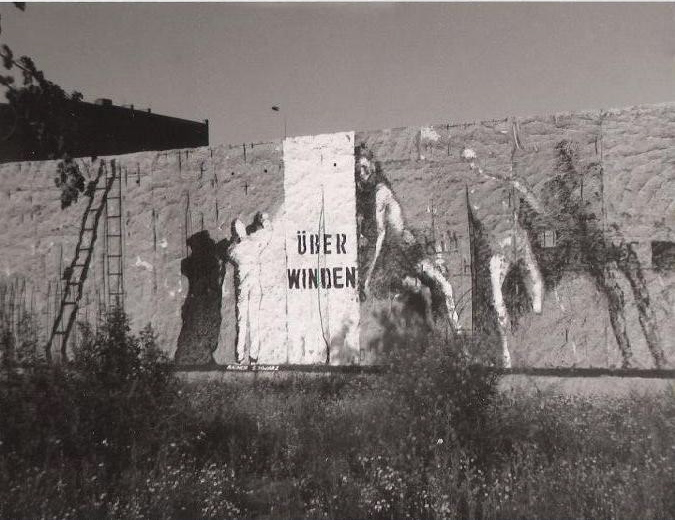
The "Rear Wall" was located on the East Berlin side, with a "death strip" of mines and other items between the walls.

The Helsinki Accords of 1975 were an important Cold War-era agreement signed by most European countries, including those of the Eastern Bloc, the United States and Canada. It governed various territorial agreements, frontier disputes, human rights, the threat of force and other items. The "third basket" of the Helsinki Accords contained pledges to uphold rights to international travel, family contact and freedom of information, and to promote cultural exchanges. In East Germany, while the government downplayed the existence of this provision in the media, as potential emigrants came to slowly perceive that exit visas might be attainable to some, 7,200 first time applicants applied in the late 1970s.

West Germany negotiated the exodus of some ethnic Germans from Poland in exchange for financial inducements, including large loans. Similarly, Romania was paid a fixed amount of 5,000 West Deutsche Marks (DM) per ethnic German permitted to leave, which was increased to 7,800 DM in 1983 and to 11,000 DM in 1988. East Germany exported 70,000 political prisoners to West Germany, in exchange for 70,000 DM per head paid by West Germany, which netted East Germany 3.4 billion West Deutsche Marks at a time when it was in financial crisis. East Germany viewed the payments they received for the release not as ransom, but as compensation of the damage such individuals inflicted on the socialist system, as well as reimbursement for their costs of education. However, letting some leave legally set a dangerous precedent, including the long term threat of the general public strongly moving for a right to emigrate. The Central Committee in 1988 warned that "the necessary commitment to preventing attempts to emigrate is not present in many", "the required prevailing atmosphere of opposition to these phenomena has not yet been achieved" and trade union "functionaries or brigade leaders sometimes state that they fail to understand why these citizens are not permitted to emigrate."

The regimes' strategy was to grant applications selectively and with long delays in a process that was designed to be demeaning, frustrating and leading to years of applicants waiting for a departure date that would never arrive. In addition, while waiting, applicants were subject to open discrimination, faced workplace firing or demotion, were denied university access, and were forced to relinquish their passports resulting in the denial of travel rights even within their country of residence. In 1984, twenty-five Czechoslovaks occupied the West German embassy in Prague demanding asylum in the west while seven East Germans did so in the library of the United States embassy in West Berlin. The authorities relented, and that year witnessed a huge rise in legal emigration, with applications swelling to 57,600, 29,800 of which were granted. Small groups of organized applicants had already held vigils calling for legal emigration since the late 1970s. The movement and application figures grew by the late 1980s as the east–west prosperity gap widened resulting in West German citizenship looking more attractive, while authorities were at a loss how to address the application rise. Increasing visa grants in the late 1980s accompanying a 1988 decision to prioritize those for citizens who engaged in protests provided incentives to further expand the movement. The East German SED party conceded that "[t]he emigration problem is confronting us with a fundamental problem of [East Germany]'s development" and this challenge "threatens to undermine beliefs in the correctness of the party's policies." The move accompanied a growing dissolving of confidence that the problems facing socialism could ever be solved and whether that system was the future.

=== Liberalization ===
By the late 1980s, Hungary had allowed citizens over fifty five years old to leave and liberalized family reunification emigration, along with increased travel permissions. Romania also liberalized emigration for family reunification purposes. By the mid-1980s, East Germany extended its program receiving payment for political prisoner release to the west to include "family reunification." The political prisoner payments became so large that East Germany accounted for them in their state economic planning process. Emigration restriction liberalisation in 1989 followed another flood of outmigration to West Germany during the Revolutions of 1989 indirectly through third countries—such as Hungary, Czechoslovakia and Poland—which accelerated the demise of the East German government when the closure of the borders precipitated demonstrations.

In 1985, following the Era of Stagnation, reform-minded Soviet leader Mikhail Gorbachev signaled the trend toward greater liberalization. Emigration increased following liberalizations passed in 1986. For example, the flow of ethnic Germans from the Eastern Bloc dramatically increased from 42,786 per year in 1986 to 202,673 in 1988. The Soviet Union was facing a period of severe economic decline and needed Western technology. Subsidies to foreign client states further strained the moribund Soviet economy. The post-Soviet period saw five major waves of emigration from Russia, each linked to social, political, and economic instability. Economy crises in 1991 and 2008 played a key role in motivating citizens to seek opportunities abroad.

The first signs of major reform came in 1986 when Gorbachev launched a policy of glasnost (openness) in the Soviet Union, and emphasized the need for perestroika (economic restructuring). Though glasnost advocated openness and political criticism, at the time, it was only permitted in accordance with the political views of the ruling powers. The general public in the Eastern bloc were still threatened by secret police and political repression.

Believing Gorbachev's reform initiatives would be short-lived, orthodox Communist rulers like: East Germany's Erich Honecker, People's Republic of Bulgaria's Todor Zhivkov, Czechoslovak Socialist Republic's Gustáv Husák and Socialist Republic of Romania’s Nicolae Ceauşescu obstinately ignored the calls for change. "When your neighbor puts up new wallpaper, it doesn't mean you have to too," declared one East German politburo member.

=== Revolutions and free emigration ===
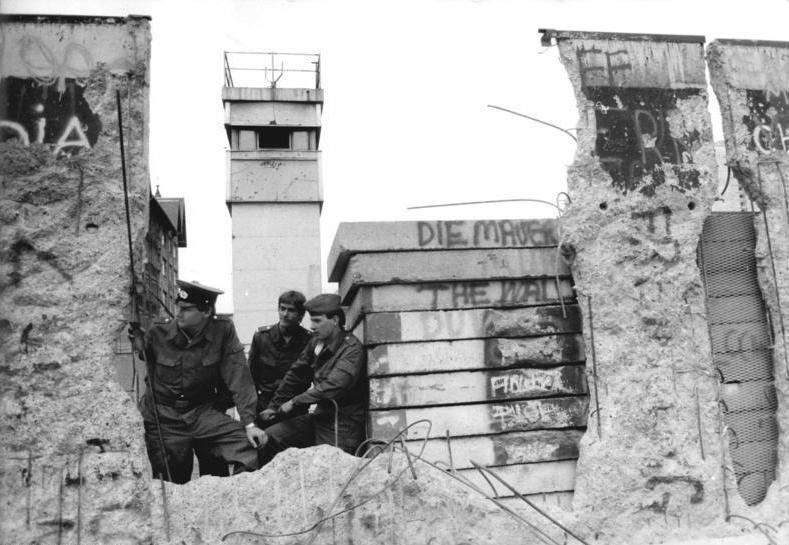
East German border guards look through a hole in the Berlin Wall in 1990.

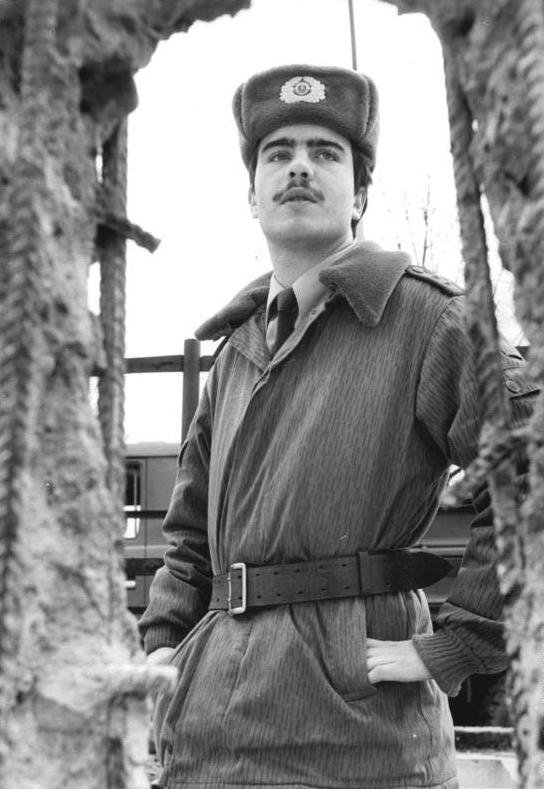
East German border guard viewed through a hole in the Berlin Wall in 1990

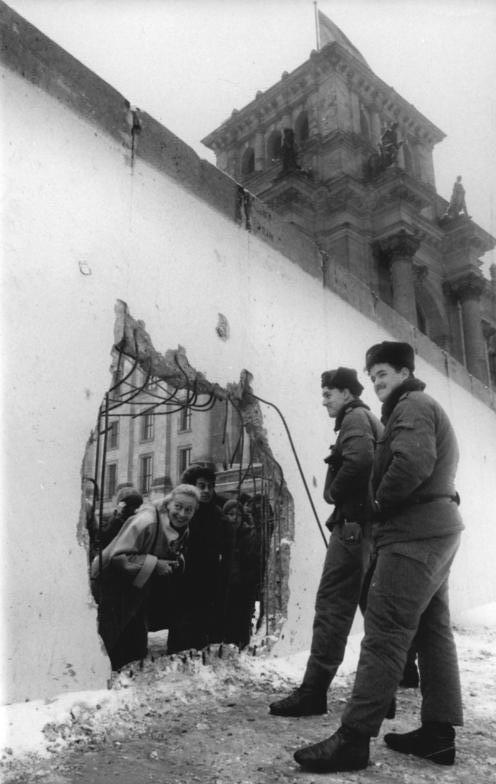
West Germans curiously peer at East German border guards through a hole in the wall.

By 1989, the Soviet Union had repealed the Brezhnev Doctrine in favor of non-intervention in the internal affairs of its Warsaw Pact allies, termed the Sinatra Doctrine in a joking reference to the song "My Way". A wave of Revolutions of 1989, sometimes called the "Autumn of Nations", swept across the Eastern Bloc. In the People's Republic of Poland in April 1989, the Solidarity organization was legalized, allowed to participate in parliamentary elections and captured a stunning 99 out of the 100 available parliamentary seats (with the one remaining seat taken by an independent candidate). Hungary had achieved some lasting economic reforms and limited political liberalization during the 1980s, but major reforms only occurred following the replacement of János Kádár as General Secretary of the Communist Party in 1988.

In August 1989, the People's Republic of Hungary removed its physical border restrictions with Austria. The next month, more than 13,000 East German tourists in Hungary escaped to Austria, while Hungary prevented a larger number of East Germans from crossing the border, returning them to Budapest. The Monday demonstrations in East Germany (German: Montagsdemonstrationen) began, with East German protesters demanding rights such as the freedom to travel to foreign countries and to elect a democratic government. With regard to East Germans demanding emigration rights in Czechoslovakia, West German Foreign Minister Hans-Dietrich Genscher negotiated an agreement that allowed them to travel to the West, in trains that had to pass first through East Germany. When the trains passed Dresden central station in early October, police forces had to stop people from trying to jump on the trains.

By 9 October 1989, just after the celebrations for the 40th anniversary of East Germany, thousands of protesters gathered, what had begun as a few hundred gatherers at the Nikolai Church in East Berlin chanting "Wir sind das Volk!" ("We are the people!"). Although some demonstrators were arrested, the threat of large-scale intervention by security forces never materialized, with SED leader Helmut Hackenberg and others not receiving precise orders for such action from a surprised East Berlin. These were followed by even larger protests exceeding 300,000 the next week. East German leader Honecker remained opposed to internal reform, with his regime even going so far as forbidding the circulation of Soviet publications that it viewed as subversive. Faced with ongoing and increasing civil unrest, the ruling Socialist Unity Party (SED) deposed Honecker in mid-October, and replaced him with Egon Krenz.

A wave of refugees left East Germany for the West through Czechoslovakia, which was tolerated by the new Krenz government and in agreement with the Czechoslovak government. To ease the complications, the Krenz-led Politburo had decided on 9 November to allow East Germans to travel directly to West Berlin the next day. However the government spokesman misstated the news and stated that East Germans could leave for the West effective immediately. As rumors spread, before the regulations were to go effect, on the night of 9 November, tens of thousands of Eastern Berliners flooded Checkpoint Charlie and other checkpoints along the wall, crossing into West Berlin. The surprised and overwhelmed border guards made many hectic telephone calls to their superiors, but it became clear that there was no one among the East German authorities who would dare to take personal responsibility for issuing orders to use lethal force, so there was no way for the vastly outnumbered soldiers to hold back the huge crowd of East German citizens. Therefore, the border checkpoints were opened, although it is disputed who was the first to issue the order.

In the Czechoslovak Socialist Republic, following the suppression of a student protest in Prague, increasing protests swelled to an estimated half-million Czechs and Slovaks demanding freedoms. A two-hour general strike, involving all citizens of Czechoslovakia, was held on 27 November 1989. Barbed wire and other obstructions were removed from the border with West Germany and Austria in early December. The next day, the Communist Party of Czechoslovakia announced that it would relinquish power and dismantle the one-party state. On 10 December, President Gustáv Husák appointed the first largely non-Communist government in Czechoslovakia since 1948, and resigned, in what was called the Velvet Revolution.

In the People's Republic of Bulgaria, on 10 November 1989 – the day after the mass crossings across the Berlin Wall – Bulgaria's long-serving leader Todor Zhivkov was ousted by his Politburo and replaced with Petar Mladenov. In February 1990 the Party voluntarily gave up its claim on power and in June 1990 the first free elections since 1931 were held, won by the moderate wing of the Communist Party, renamed the Bulgarian Socialist Party.

Unlike other Eastern Bloc countries, the Socialist Republic of Romania had never undergone even a limited de-Stalinization. In November 1989, Ceauşescu, then aged 71, was re-elected for another five years as leader of the Romanian Communist Party, signaling that he intended to ride out the anti-Communist uprisings sweeping the rest of Eastern Europe. As Ceauşescu prepared to go on a state visit to Iran, on 16 December 1989, his Securitate ordered the arrest and exile of a local Hungarian-speaking Calvinist minister, László Tőkés, for sermons offending the regime.

Rioting followed the arrest. Returning from Iran, Ceauşescu ordered a mass rally in his support outside Communist Party headquarters in Bucharest. However, to his shock, the crowd booed as he spoke. Mass protests followed, with about 100,000 protesters occupying Operei Square chanting anti-government protests: "Noi suntem poporul!" ("We are the people!"), "Armata e cu noi!" ("The army is on our side!"), "Nu vă fie frică, Ceauşescu pică!" ("Have no fear, Ceauşescu will fall"). The Romanian military changed sides, turning on Ceauşescu, who was executed after a brief trial three days later.

In the People's Socialist Republic of Albania, a new package of regulations went into effect on 3 July 1990 entitling all Albanians over the age of 16 to own a passport for foreign travel. Meanwhile, hundreds of Albanian citizens gathered around foreign embassies to seek political asylum and flee the country.

Technically the Berlin Wall remained guarded for some time after 9 November, though at a decreasing intensity. On 13 June 1990, the official dismantling of the Wall by the East German military began in Bernauer Straße. On 1 July, the day East Germany adopted the West German currency, all border controls ceased, although the inter-German border had become meaningless for some time before that. That month, the final obstacle to German reunification was removed when West German Chancellor Helmut Kohl convinced Gorbachev to drop Soviet objections to a reunited Germany within NATO, in return for substantial German economic aid to the Soviet Union.

== Defectors ==
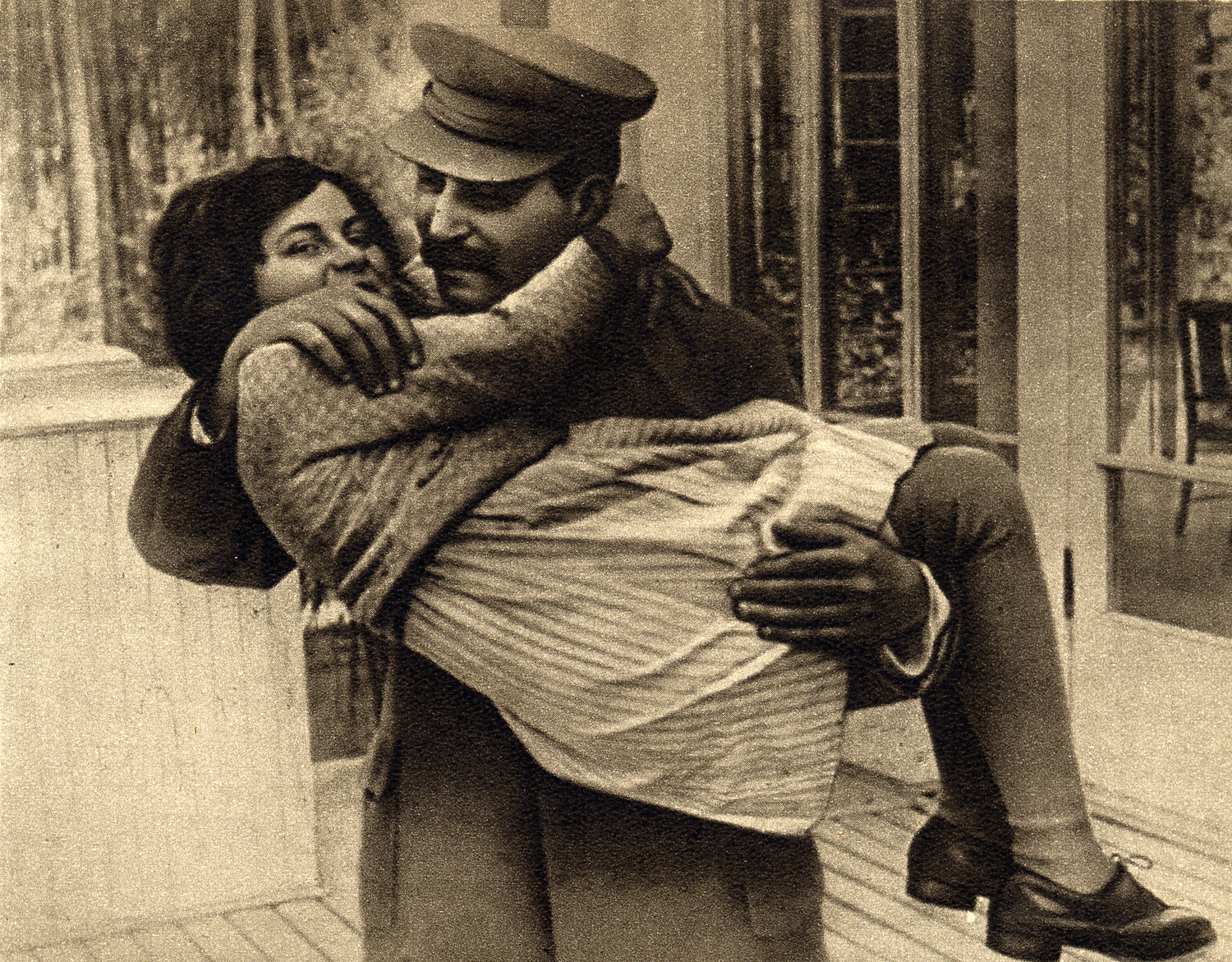
Svetlana Alliluyeva, the daughter of Joseph Stalin, pictured with her father in 1935. Alliluyeva defected in 1967 via New Delhi to the United States and denounced Stalin's regime and the Soviet government. In 1984 she returned to the USSR, where she applied for and was granted Soviet citizenship.

=== Escapees ===
Although international movement was, for the most part, strictly controlled, there was a steady loss through escapees who were able to use ingenious methods to evade frontier security. Some of the people who tried to escape were in fact East german guards or soldiers. Some of them used military vehicles to smash through the Berlin wall. In East Germany, the term Republikflucht (fugitives from the Republic) was used for anyone wishing to leave to non-socialist countries. Republikflucht attempts to leave East Germany constituted a criminal act and carried severe penalties. Regarding the reasoning for such restrictions, a propaganda booklet published by the Socialist Unity Party of Germany (SED) in 1955 for the use of party agitators outlined the seriousness of 'flight from the republic', stating "leaving the GDR is an act of political and moral backwardness and depravity", and "workers throughout Germany will demand punishment for those who today leave the German Democratic Republic, the strong bastion of the fight for peace, to serve the deadly enemy of the German people, the imperialists and militarists". Moreover, an attempt to flee via East Germany's fortified borders involved considerable personal risk of injury or death. Estimates for those killed attempting to escape over the Berlin Wall range from 136 to just over 200. About 75,000 people were caught and imprisoned.

=== Hijackers ===
On 15 June 1970, twelve mostly Jewish defectors were caught attempting to hijack a plane to escape from the Soviet Union, and were assigned harsh sentences, including death sentences for the two leaders, which were later commuted to 15 years in a labor camp. At least six attempted skyjacking defection attempts were made from Armenia, the Soviet Union, and Lithuania from 1970 to 1971.

There were three hijackings of airliners by GDR citizens to escape to West Germany; the most well-known is the LOT Polish Airlines Flight 165 hijacking in 1978.

=== Famous and discreet defectors ===
Famous defectors include Joseph Stalin's daughter Svetlana Alliluyeva (though she returned in 1984), MiG-25 pilot Viktor Belenko, U.N. Undersecretary General Arkady Shevchenko, chess grandmaster Viktor Korchnoi, ballet stars Rudolf Nureyev, Mikhail Baryshnikov, Natalia Makarova, and Alexander Godunov. Famous East German defectors include writer Wolfgang Leonhard, East German soldier Conrad Schumann, who was famously photographed jumping the Berlin wall while it was under construction, and a number of European football players, including Jörg Berger. Famous Czech defectors include tennis player Martina Navratilova who defected to the United States after the 1975 U.S. Open. Chess world champion Boris Spassky also emigrated to France in a fashion comparable to defection.

While media sources often reported high level defections, non-prominent defections usually went unreported. The number of non-public "black stream" defectors is not known.

== See also ==
- Iron Curtain
- List of Soviet and Eastern Bloc defectors
- North Korean defectors
- Post-Soviet states
- Soviet empire
- Soviet occupations
- Telephone tapping in the Eastern Bloc
- Western Bloc
