= Arkady Shevchenko =

Soviet diplomat and defector to the West

Arkady Nikolayevich Shevchenko
- Аркадій Миколайович Шевченко
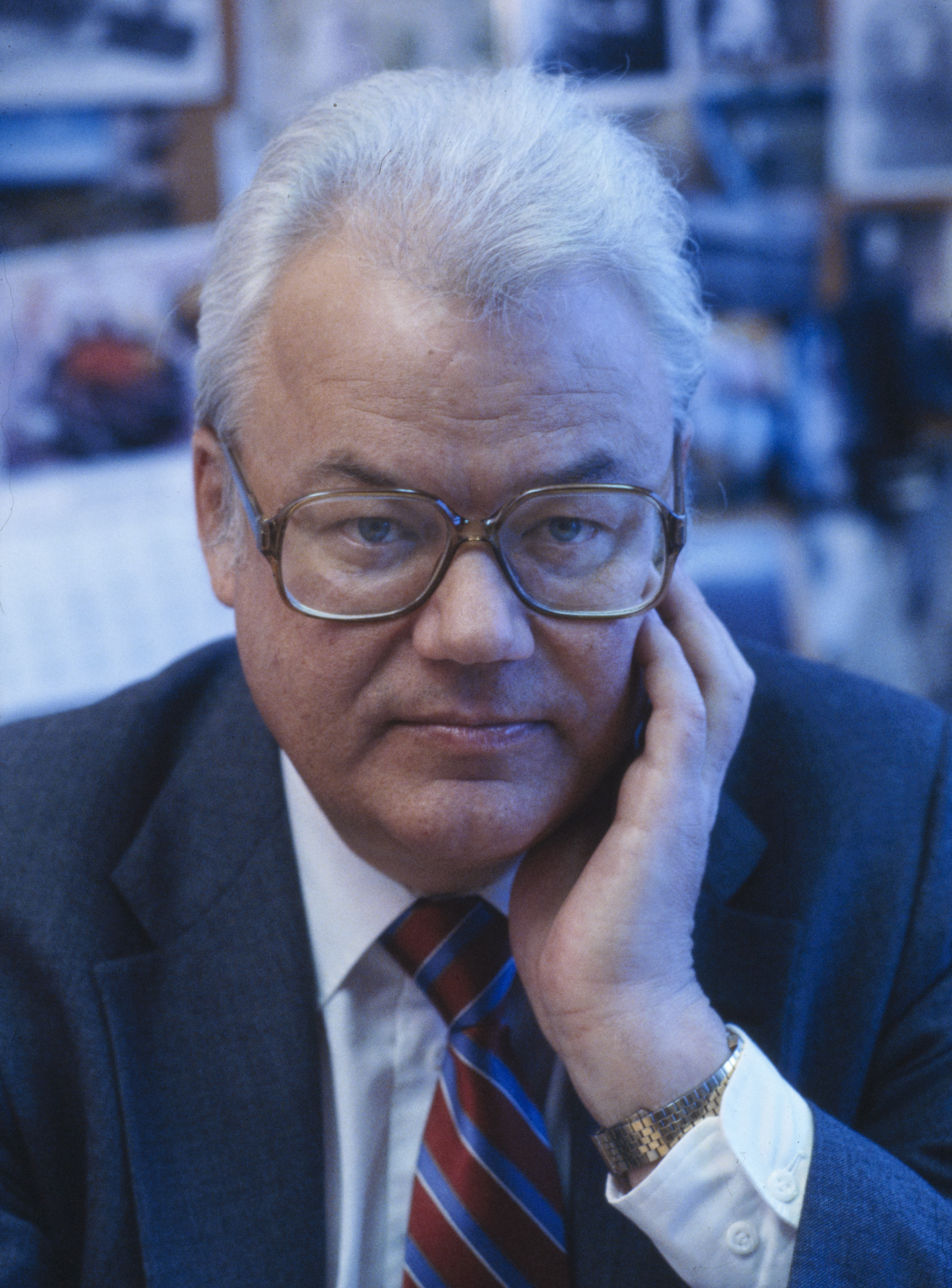
- Arkady Shevchenko in the 1980s

United Nations Under-Secretary-General for Political Affairs
- In office July 10, 1973 – June 10, 1978
- Preceded by: Leonid Kutakov
- Succeeded by: Mikhail Sytenko

Personal details
- Born: October 11, 1930 Horlivka, Ukrainian SSR, Soviet Union (now Ukraine)
- Died: February 28, 1998 (aged 67) Washington, D.C., U.S.
- Education: Moscow State Institute of International Relations

Arkady Nikolayevich Shevchenko (Note: Ukrainian: Аркадій Миколайович Шевченко, romanized: Arkadii Mykolaiovych Shevchenko Russian: Аркадий Николаевич Шевченко, romanized: Arkady Nikolayevich Shevchenko) (October 11, 1930 – February 28, 1998) was a Soviet diplomat who was the highest-ranking Soviet official to defect to the West.

Shevchenko joined the Soviet diplomatic service, the Ministry of Foreign Affairs, as a young man and rose through its ranks to become an advisor to Foreign Minister Andrei Gromyko. In 1973, he was appointed Under-Secretary-General of the United Nations (USG). During his assignment at the UN headquarters, in New York City, Shevchenko began to pass Soviet secrets to the CIA because he could not objectively fulfill his mission of impartiality to the United Nations. In 1978, he cut his ties to the Soviet Union and defected to the United States, where he lived for the rest of his life.

== Early life and education ==
Shevchenko was born in the town of Horlivka, in the east of Ukraine, and when he was five his family moved to Yevpatoria, a resort town in Crimea, on the Black Sea, where his father, a physician, was the administrator of a tuberculosis sanatorium. When Crimea was invaded by German forces in 1941, he, his mother, and the sanatorium patients were evacuated to Torgai, in the Altay Mountains of Siberia. The family was reunited in 1944 after the Germans retreated from Crimea. He later recalled how his father attended the Yalta Conference, in part on orders to observe and report on the health of US President Franklin Roosevelt.

Shevchenko graduated from secondary school in 1949 and that year was admitted to Moscow State Institute of International Relations. He studied Soviet law and Marxist, Leninist and Stalinist theory and was trained to become a foreign service diplomat. He married Leongina (Lina), a fellow student, in 1951. He completed the program in 1954 and continued with graduate studies.

== Foreign service ==
In 1956, Shevchenko joined the Ministry of Foreign Affairs as an attaché and was assigned to the OMO (Russian: Отдел Международных Организаций Министерства Иностранных Дел СССР, Department of International Organizations at the Ministry for Foreign Affairs of the USSR), a branch of the Foreign Ministry dealing with the United Nations and NGOs. In 1958, he was sent to New York City on a three-month assignment to represent the Soviet Union at the annual UN General Assembly as a disarmament specialist.

Shevchenko attended the 1962 Geneva Committee on Disarmament Negotiations as a member of the Soviet delegation. The next year, he accepted an assignment as Chief of the Soviet Mission's Security Council and Political Affairs Division at the United Nations. Since that was a permanent posting, his family accompanied him to New York City. He continued in that post until 1970 when he was appointed advisor to Andrei Gromyko. His duties covered a broad range of Soviet foreign policy initiatives.

In his disarmament role, Shevchenko had a close view of the Cuban Missile Crisis and the Soviet leadership's perspective of it. He later described it in an interview with WGBH.

In 1973, Shevchenko was promoted and became an Under-Secretary-General of the United Nations. Although he was nominally employed by the United Nations and owed his allegiance to the international organization, he was in practice expected to support and to promote Soviet aims and policies. He eventually became resentful of the restrictions that his Soviet superiors subjected him to that prevented him from carrying out his duties as an Under Secretary objectively.

== Espionage ==
The early 1970s were a time of détente between the Eastern Bloc and NATO nations. SALT I, the Anti-Ballistic Missile Treaty, the Helsinki Accords, and other international agreements were negotiated during this time. According to Shevchenko's memoirs, he became increasingly disillusioned with real Soviet attitudes toward these international agreements.

He had immediate access to the inner workings of the Soviet foreign policy establishment and felt that the Soviet government was cheating on the intent of the agreements for short-term political gain, which would be ultimately to its own disadvantage. He also stated clearly that Soviet leaders, while pretending to respect the UN, actually disdained it and viewed it solely as a means to advance Soviet interests covertly or otherwise. Furthermore, Moscow's requirement for him, as a UN officer, to put Soviet interests ahead of UN interests but to pretend otherwise was a violation of the UN Charter. He also came to believe that the Soviets' internal economic policies and their insistence on hard-line communist centralization of power were depriving the Russian people of their freedom and ability to better themselves and their country.

His long years of exposure to Western democracies convinced him that the Soviets were "taking the wrong path" economically and politically. He also was tired of and bitter about not being free and not being able to speak freely, and he wanted personal freedom. He briefly considered resigning his position with the UN and returning to the Soviet Union in an attempt to change the system from within, but he soon came to the realization that it would have been an impossible task, as he had neither the power nor the influence to effect any significant change. He did not like that option because he felt that such a life in retirement would be meaningless.

By 1975, he had decided to defect. He made contact with the CIA to seek political asylum. However, the CIA pressured him to continue at his UN post and to supply them with inside information on Soviet political plans. Although fearful of the consequences if he were to be found out by the KGB, he reluctantly agreed with the idea that if he wanted to fight against the regime's existence, that was an opportunity to do so in a way with real effect or power.

For the next three years, he acted as a "triple agent". He worked for the United Nations while also promoting Soviet political interests and providing information about Soviets activities to the CIA.

In early 1978, he became aware of increased KGB surveillance of his movements. On March 31, 1978, he received a cable from Moscow that summoned him to return to the Soviet Union for "consultations".

After being asked to return to Moscow, he reached out to his CIA contact and requested that they fulfill their promise of political asylum citing concerns to returning to his UN duties.

== Defection ==
Shevchenko often wrestled with how he would broach the idea of upcoming defection with his wife, Leongina. He knew that she would probably react angrily and refuse to accede. He ended up never telling her until he left a note for her right before he rushed out the door on April 10, 1978, while she slept.

His plan, at least consciously, was that she could read the note and catch up with him soon if she chose to, which he hoped would occur. However, when he called her the next day, a KGB man answered the phone. He surmised that as soon as she had read the note, she called the KGB. She was immediately whisked back to Moscow, where she died mysteriously, supposedly by suicide, less than two months later. Shevchenko surmised that in trying to gain leverage in her predicament, she may have threatened senior party members with exposure of their corruption, which made killing her the easiest solution.

He also later admitted to himself that the reason he never told her in advance about his defection was he knew she would probably get angry and expose his plan to the KGB. In the Soviet Union Shevchenko was tried in absentia and sentenced to death.

== Later life ==
From 1978 to his death 20 years later in Bethesda, Maryland, in the United States, Shevchenko lived and supported himself by written contributions to various publications and on the lecture circuit. In 1985, he published his autobiography, Breaking With Moscow in which he described Soviet Russia as, among other things, a gangster economy in which the KGB played a prominent role.

In the summer of 1978, the FBI ordered a 22-year-old Washington call girl named Judy Chavez for Shevchenko. Chavez later went public with the affair and published a book in 1979, Defector's Mistress, The Judy Chavez Story.

Shevchenko died on February 28, 1998, and was buried in Washington, D.C.

== See also ==
- List of Eastern Bloc defectors

== Bibliography ==
- Shevchenko, Arkady (1985). Breaking with Moscow. Knopf. ISBN 978-0394520551. OCLC 11680691.
- Arkady Shevchenko. Breaking With Moscow, 1985 - excerpts published online
- Oleg Kalugin, The First Directorate. St. Martins' Press, 1994.
- Memoirs of Arkady Shevchenko's son (in Russian)
