= Finn Gold Cup =

Sailing World Championship

The Finn Gold Cup decides the Finn Class World Champion and is an annual international sailing regatta for Finn (dinghy) they are organized by the host club on behalf of the International Class Association and recognized by World Sailing, the sports IOC recognized governing body. It has been held every year since 1956.

Up until 2021 the Finn was also used in the Olympic Sailing Competition so a lot of the World Championship held during this period were also Olympic Qualification events. It also ment that for four editions the event was organised by World Sailing as part of the combined olympic class world championships known as the Sailing World Championships.

== Events ==
Event			Host			Participation					Ref.
Ed.	Dates	Year	Host club	Location	Country	No.			Nat.	Cont	Ref.
1	29Mar -2Apr	1956	Royal Corinthian Yacht Club, Burnham	Burnham-on-Crouch	United Kingdom	45			12		
2	31Mar -4Aug	1957		Karlstad	Sweden	78			13		
3	1May -5	1958		Zeebrugge	Belgium	84			15		
4	4-9 Aug	1959		Hellerup	Denmark	109			18		
5	4-10 Jun	1960		Torquay	United Kingdom	38			7		
6	14-19 Aug	1961		Travemünde	West Germany	109			17		
7	6-11 Aug	1962		Tønsberg	Norway	166			13		
8	12-19 Aug	1963		Medemblik	Netherlands	162			22		
9	18-26 Jul	1964		Torquay	United Kingdom	65			20		
10	22-29 Jul	1965		Gdynia	Poland	93			21		
11	21-29 Aug	1966		La Baule	France	150			26		
12	6-12 Aug	1967		Hanko	Finland	130			22		
13	6-12 Aug	1968		Whitstable	United Kingdom	138			38		
14	6-12 Aug	1969		Hamilton	Bermuda	132			27		
15	14-22 Aug	1970		Cascais	Portugal	160			34		
16	1-9 Oct	1971		Toronto	Canada	87			21		
17	25Jun -1Jul	1972		Anzio	Italy	103			25		
18	14-23 Jul	1973		Brest	France	103			20		
19	10-17 Aug	1974	Alamitos Bay Yacht Club	Long Beach	United States	96			19		
20	10-19 Jun	1975		Malmö	Sweden	141			27		
21	2-10 Jan	1976		Brisbane	Australia	82			14		
22	6-17 Sep	1977		Palamós	Spain	129			26		
23	16-26 Nov	1978		Manzanillo	Mexico	69			14		
24	5-15 Sep	1979		Weymouth	United Kingdom	135			27		
25	18-27 Feb	1980		Takapuna	New Zealand	66			14		
26	5-19 Jul	1981		Grömitz	West Germany	110			22		
27	9-19 Sep	1982		Medemblik	Netherlands	126			22		
28	13-21 Aug	1983		Milwaukee	United States	94			25		
29	17–27 May	1984		Anzio	Italy	103			29		
30	26Jun -6Jul	1985		Marstrand	Sweden	101			25		
31	5-13 Jul	1986		Palma de Mallorca	Spain	82			21		
32	26Jun -7Jul	1987		Kiel	West Germany	57			17		
33	31Jan -11Feb	1988		Ilhabela	Brazil	48			11		
34	6-16 Apr	1989		Alassio	Italy	72			20		
35	5-15 Jul	1990		Porto Carras	Greece	105			25		
36	1-3 Sep	1991		Kingston	Canada	96			21		
37	10–17 May	1992		Cádiz	Spain	94			32		
38	9-19 Jul	1993	Ballyholme Yacht Club	Bangor	United Kingdom	61			19		
39	12-21 Aug	1994		Pärnu	Estonia	69			23		
40	7-15 Jan	1995		Melbourne	Australia	65			23		
41	1–19 May	1996	Societe des Regates Rochelaises	La Rochelle	France	71			27		
42	3-13 Jul	1997		Gdańsk	Poland	81			29	5	
43	17-23 Aug	1998		Athens	Greece	84			28	5	
44	6-17 Jan	1999		Melbourne	Australia	71			28	6	
45	11-16 Jun	2000	Weymouth and Portland National Sailing Academy	Isle of Portland	United Kingdom	89			32	6	
46	21-29 Sep	2001	Eastern Yacht Club, Marblehead	Marblehead	United States	57			19	4	
47	20-28 Jul	2002		Athens	Greece	89			29	5	
48	11-24 Sep	2003		Cádiz	Spain	81			31	5	
49	12-20 Feb	2004	Iate Clube do Rio de Janeiro	Rio de Janeiro	Brazil	54			25	4	
50	9-17 Sep	2005	Moscow Sailing School	Moscow	Russia	98			29	3	
51	8-16 Jul	2006		Split	Croatia	99			31	4	
52	28Jun -`3Jul	2007	Clube Naval de Cascais	Cascais	Portugal	79			34	5	
53	20-29 Jan	2008	Black Rock Yacht Club	Black Rock	Australia	82			33	5	
54	3-11 Jul	2009	Vallensbæk Sejlklub	Vallensbæk Strand	Denmark	87			30	5	
55	27Aug -4Sep	2010	St. Francis Yacht Club	Berkeley	United States	87			29	5	
56	3-18 Dec	2011		Perth	Australia	72			33	6	
57	13–18 May	2012	Royal Cornwall Yacht Club	Falmouth	United Kingdom	94			30	5	
58	23-31 Aug	2013	Kalev Yacht Club	Tallinn	Estonia	86			29	4	
59	12-21 Sep	2014		Santander	Spain	78			31	6	
60	21-30 Nov	2015	Takapuna Boating Club	Auckland	New Zealand	75			28	5	
61	5–15 May	2016	Yacht Club Gaeta	Gaeta	Italy	73			25	5	
62	1-19 Sep	2017	Spartacus Sailing Club	Balatonföldvár	Hungary	113			32	5	
63	30Jul -12Aug	2018		Aarhus	Denmark	90			42	6	
64	16-21 Jan	2019	Royal Brighton Yacht Club	Brighton	Australia	60			22	5	
N/A	8–16 May	2020	Club Nautic S'Arenal	Palma de Mallorca	Spain	(RESCHEDULED)					
N/A	2-10 Oct	2020	Club Nautic S'Arenal	Palma de Mallorca	Spain	(Cancelled COVID 19)					
65	4–12 May	2021		Porto	Portugal	52	52	0	31	5	
66	15–21 May	2022	Fraglia Vela Malcesine	Malcesine	Italy	110			17	3	
67	24–31 Jan	2023	Coconut Grove Sailing Club	Miami	United States	58			16	4	
68	3–7 Sep	2024	Sailing Aarhus	Aarhus	Denmark	103	103	0	21	4	
69	2–6 Sep	2025	Clube Naval de Cascais	Cascais	Portugal	80	79	1	18	3	
70	12–19 Feb	2026	Royal Queensland Yacht Squadron	Manly, Brisbane	Australia	66	66	0	15	4	

== Multiple medallists ==
#	Athlete	Country	Gold	Silver	Bronze	Total
1	Ben Ainslie	Great Britain	6	0	0	6
2	Giles Scott	Great Britain	4	0	1	5
3	Fredrik Lööf	Sweden	3	3	1	7
4	Jörg Bruder	Brazil	3	2	1	6
5	Lasse Hjortnæs	Denmark	3	2	0	5
6	Willi Kuhweide	West Germany	3	0	0	3

== Medalists ==
Year	Gold	Silver	Bronze	Ref.
1956 Burnham-on-Crouch	André Nelis (BEL)	Paul Elvstrøm (DEN)	Brian Roswell (CAN)	
1957 Karlstad	Jürgen Vogler (GDR)	Harald Bredo Eriksen (NOR)	André Nelis (BEL)	
1958 Zeebrugge	Paul Elvstrøm (DEN)	André Nelis (BEL)	Adelchi Pelaschier (ITA)	
1959 Hellerup	Paul Elvstrøm (DEN)	André Nelis (BEL)	Pierre Poullain (FRA)	
1960 Torquay	Vernon Stratton (GBR)	André Nelis (BEL)	Desmond Stratton (GBR)	
1961 Travemünde	André Nelis (BEL)	Hans Fogh (DEN)	Fred Miller (USA)	
1962 Tønsberg	Arne Åkerson (SWE)	Boris Jacobsson (SWE)	André Nelis (BEL)	
1963 Medemblik	Wilhelm Kuhweide (FRG)	Boris Jacobsson (SWE)	Hans Willems (NED)	
1964 Torquay	Hubert Raudaschl (AUT)	Hakan Kellner (SWE)	Richard Creagh (CAN)	
1965 Gdynia	Jürgen Mier (GDR)	Bernd Dehmel (GDR)	Richard Hart (GBR)	
1966 La Baule	Wilhelm Kuhweide (FRG)	Jörg Bruder (BRA)	Bernhard Straubinger (FRG)	
1967 Hanko	Wilhelm Kuhweide (FRG)	Valentin Mankin (URS)	Uwe Mares (FRG)	
1968 Whitestable	Henning Wind (DEN)	Uwe Mares (FRG)	Jörg Bruder (BRA)	
1969 Hamilton	Thomas Lundqvist (SWE)	Jörg Bruder (BRA)	Peter Barrett (USA)	
1970 Cascais	Jörg Bruder (BRA)	Henry Spraque (USA)	Robert Andre (USA)	
1971 Toronto	Jörg Bruder (BRA)	Carl Van Duyne (USA)	Serge Maury (FRA)	
1972 Anzio	Jörg Bruder (BRA)	John Bertrand (AUS)	Lennart Gustafsson (SWE)	
1973 Brest	Serge Maury (FRA)	Magnus Olin (SWE)	Guy Lilljegren (SWE)	
1974 Long Beach	Henry Spraque (USA)	Guy Lilljegren (SWE)	Kent Carlsson (SWE)	
1975 Malmö	Magnus Olin (SWE)	Baudouin Binkhorst (NED)	Jonty Farmer (NZL)	
1976 Brisbane	Chris Law (GBR)	Jonty Farmer (NZL)	John Bertrand (AUS)	
1977 Palamos	Joaquín Blanco (ESP)	José Luis Doreste (ESP)	Cláudio Biekarck (BRA)	
1978 Manzanillo	John Bertrand (USA)	Joaquín Blanco (ESP)	Carl Buchan (USA)	
1979 Weymouth	Cameron Lewis (USA)	John Bertrand (USA)	Mark Neeleman (NED)	
1980 Auckland	Cameron Lewis (USA)	John Bertrand (USA)	Lawrence Lemieux (CAN)	
1981 Gromitz	Wolfgang Gerz (FRG)	Lasse Hjortnæs (DEN)	Miroslav Rychzik (POL)	
1982 Medemblik	Lasse Hjortnæs (DEN)	Henryk Blaszka (POL)	Buzz Reynolds (USA)	
1983 Milwaukee	Paul van Cleve (USA)	Wolfgang Gerz (FRG)	Mark Neeleman (NED)	
1984 Anzio	Lasse Hjortnæs (DEN)	Terence Neilson (CAN)	Jörgen Lindhardtsen (DEN)	
1985 Marstrand	Lasse Hjortnæs (DEN)	Oleg Khopyorsky (URS)	Ingvar Bengtsson (SWE)	
1986 El Arenal	Stig Westergaard (DEN)	Brian Ledbetter (USA)	José Luis Doreste (ESP)	
1987 Kiel	José Luis Doreste (ESP)	Lasse Hjortnæs (DEN)	Brian Ledbetter (USA)	
1988 Ilha Bela	Thomas Schmid (FRG)	Roy Heiner (NED)	Gordon Anderson (CAN)	
1989 Alassio	Stig Westergaard (DEN)	Eric Mergenthaler (MEX)	Oleg Khopyorsky (URS)	
1990 Porto Carras	Hank Lammens (CAN)	Lawrence Lemieux (CAN)	Eric Mergenthaler (MEX)	
1991 Kingston	Hank Lammens (CAN)	Brian Ledbetter (USA)	Oleg Khopyorsky (URS)	
1992 Cádiz	Eric Mergenthaler (MEX)	Glen Bourke (AUS)	Hans Spitzauer (AUT)	
1993 Bangor	Philippe Presti (FRA)	Fredrik Lööf (SWE)	Richard Clarke (CAN)	
1994 Pärnu	Fredrik Lööf (SWE)	Hank Lammens (CAN)	José van der Ploeg (ESP)	
1995 Melbourne	Hans Spitzauer (AUT)	Fredrik Lööf (SWE)	Philippe Presti (FRA)	
1996 La Rochelle	Philippe Presti (FRA)	Hans Spitzauer (AUT)	Fredrik Lööf (SWE)	
1997 Gdańsk	Fredrik Lööf (SWE)	Luca Devoti (ITA)	Xavier Rohart (FRA)	
1998 Athens	Mateusz Kusznierewicz (POL)	Fredrik Lööf (SWE)	Xavier Rohart (FRA)	
1999 Melbourne	Fredrik Lööf (SWE)	Mateusz Kusznierewicz (POL)	Richard Clarke (CAN)	
2000 Weymouth	Mateusz Kusznierewicz (POL)	Sébastien Godefroid (BEL)	Aimilios Papathanasiou (GRE)	
2001 Marblehead	Sébastien Godefroid (BEL)	Mateusz Kusznierewicz (POL)	Aimilios Papathanasiou (GRE)	
2002 Athens	Ben Ainslie (GBR)	Mateusz Kusznierewicz (POL)	Aimilios Papathanasiou (GRE)	
2003 Cádiz	Ben Ainslie (GBR)	Rafael Trujillo (ESP)	Andrew Simpson (GBR)	
2004 Rio de Janeiro	Ben Ainslie (GBR)	Richard Clarke (CAN)	David Burrows (IRL)	
2005 Moscow	Ben Ainslie (GBR)	Aimilios Papathanasiou (GRE)	Chris Cook (CAN)	
2006 Split	Jonas Høgh-Christensen (DEN)	Aimilios Papathanasiou (GRE)	Edward Wright (GBR)	
2007 Cascais	Rafael Trujillo (ESP)	Pieter-Jan Postma (NED)	Gašper Vinčec (SLO)	
2008 Melbourne	Ben Ainslie (GBR)	Dan Slater (NZL)	Jonas Høgh-Christensen (DEN)	
2009 Vallensbæk	Jonas Høgh-Christensen (DEN)	Zach Railey (USA)	Ivan Kljaković Gašpić (CRO)	
2010 San Francisco	Edward Wright (GBR)	Rafael Trujillo (ESP)	Giles Scott (GBR)	
2011 Perth	Giles Scott (GBR)	Pieter-Jan Postma (NED)	Edward Wright (GBR)	
2012 Falmouth	Ben Ainslie (GBR)	Edward Wright (GBR)	Jonas Høgh-Christensen (DEN)	
2013 Tallinn	Jorge Zarif (BRA)	Edward Wright (GBR)	Pieter-Jan Postma (NED)	
2014 Santander	Giles Scott (GBR)	Ivan Kljaković Gašpić (CRO)	Edward Wright (GBR)	
2015 Takapuna	Giles Scott (GBR)	Jonathan Lobert (FRA)	Vasilij Žbogar (SLO)	
2016 Gaeta	Giles Scott (GBR)	Jonas Høgh-Christensen (DEN)	Pieter-Jan Postma (NED)	
2017 Balatonföldvár	Max Salminen (SWE)	Jonathan Lobert (FRA)	Nicholas Heiner (NED)	
2018 Aarhus	Zsombor Berecz (HUN)	Max Salminen (SWE)	Pieter-Jan Postma (NED)	
2019 Melbourne	Josh Junior (NZL)	Nicholas Heiner (NED)	Zsombor Berecz (HUN)	
2021 Porto	Andy Maloney (NZL)	Joan Cardona (ESP)	Josh Junior (NZL)	
2022 Malcesine	Pieter-Jan Postma (NED)	Oskari Muhonen (FIN)	Domonkos Németh (HUN)	
2023 Coconut Grove	Ed Wright (GBR)	Domonkos Németh (HUN)	Miguel Fernández (ESP)	
2024 Aarhus	Oskari Muhonen (FIN)	Domonkos Németh (HUN)	Alessandro Marega (ITA)	
2025 Cascais	Deniss Karpak (EST)	Arkadiy Kistanov (ITA)	Oskari Muhonen (FIN)	
2026 Brisbane	Alessandro Marega (ITA)	Anders Pedersen (NOR)	Brendan Casey (AUS)	

== See also ==
- Finn Youth World Championship
- Finn Masters World Championship
- ISAF Sailing World Championships
- World Sailing
