= Finn Masters World Championship =

Sailing World Championship

The Finn Masters World Championship is an annual international sailing regatta for Finn (dinghy) they are organized by the host club on behalf of the International Class Association and recognized by World Sailing, the sports IOC recognized governing body. The term masters refers to the minimum age of competitors which is currently for helms of any gender over 39.

== Events ==
Event			Host			Participation			Ref.
Ed.	Dates	Year	Host club	Location	Country	No.	Nat.	Cont	Ref.
2	17-19 Sep	1971		Medemblik	Netherlands				
3	29-31 Jul	1972		Gargnano, Lake Garda	Italy				
4	-	1973		Nauchatel	Switzerland				
5	19Jun -6	1974		Port Carmargue	France				
6	24-28 Jun	1975		Port Carmargue	France				
7	13-19 Jun	1976		Port Carmargue	France				
8	11-17 Jun	1977		Port Carmargue	France				
9	11-17 Jun	1978		Port Carmargue	France				
10	4-9 Jun	1979		Port Carmargue	France				
11	21-27 Jun	1980		Lake Lipno	Czech Republic				
12	7-13 Jun	1981		Port Carmargue	France				
13	31May -4Jun	1982		Lake Neusiedl	Austria				
14	21–28 May	1983		Port Carmargue	France				
15	11-15 Jun	1984		Lago di Caldaro	Italy				
16	28–31 May	1985		Seebruck	Germany				
17	18–23 May	1986		Lagi di Bracciano	Italy				
18	7-12 Jun	1987		Les Embiez	France				
19	21–28 May	1988		Lido degli Estensi	Italy				
20	15–20 May	1989		Torbole, Lake Garda	Italy				
21	-	1990		Altenrhein, Lake Boden	Switzerland				
22	18–25 May	1991		Port Carmargue	France				
23	6-12 Jun	1992		Uppsala	Sweden				
24	29May -4Jun	1993		Lake Bracciano	Italy				
25	21–29 May	1994		Diessen	Germany				
26	-	1995		Malcesine, Lake Garda	Italy				
27	1–10 May	1996	Societe des Regates Rochelaises	La Rochelle, Charente-Maritime	France				
28	18–24 May	1997		Cervia, Italy	Italy	129	14	2	
29	30May -5Jun	1998		Castelleto di Brenzone, Lake Garda	Italy	127	13	2	
30	21–28 May	1999		Maubuisson	France	148	16	4	
31	11-16 Jun	2000	Weymouth and Portland National Sailing Academy	Isle of Portland	United Kingdom	87	15	4	
32	25–31 May	2001		Kingston	Canada	32	9	3	
33	20–27 May	2002	Labud Yacht Club	Split	Croatia	134	17	4	
34	6-13 Jun	2003	Schweriner Yacht Club	Schwerin	Germany	164	15	4	
35	30May -4Jun	2004	Yacht Club de Cannes	Cannes, Alpes-Maritimes	France	192	21	5	
36	12–20 May	2005		Braciano Lake	Italy	168	15	3	
37	1-9 Jun	2006		Lake Balaton	Hungary	184	19	4	
38	25May -1Jun	2007		Murcia	Spain	134	16	3	
39	9–16 May	2008		Medemblk	Netherlands	229	24	5	
40	30May -5Jun	2009	CV Bordeaux	Maubuisson	France	264	23	4	
41	23–28 May	2010	JK Labud	Split	Croatia	167	24	4	
42	10-17 Jun	2011	Circolo Velico Cala Civette	Punta Ala	Italy	283	27	4	
43	25May -1Jun	2012	Pwllheli Sailing Club	Pwllheli, Wales	United Kingdom	132	22	4	
44	16–24 May	2013	Societe des Regates Rochelaises	La Rochelle	France	279	27	4	
45	6-13 Jun	2014	Sopot Sailing Club	Sopot	Poland	230	25	4	
46	22–29 May	2015	Nautical Club of Kavala	Nea Iraklitsa	Greece	204	24	5	
47	13–20 May	2016	Circolo Vela Torbole	Nago–Torbole, Lake Garda	Italy	343	30	5	
48	2-9 Jul	2017		Carlisle Bay	Bahamas	132	20	5	
49	18–25 May	2018	Club Nautico El Balis	Barcelona	Spain	340	31	5	
50	7-14 Jun	2019	Kongelig Dansk Yachtklub	Skovshoved	Denmark	240	28	5	
n/a	31May -5Jun	2020	Marina Port Zélande	Grevelingenmeer	Netherlands	CANCELLED COVID)			
n/a	21–28 May	2021	Royal Yacht Club Hollandia	Medemblik	Netherlands	CANCELLED COVID)			
51	8-15 Oct	2021	Federación de Vela de la Región de Murcia (FVRM)	Los Alcázares	Spain	108	20	3	
52	1-8 Jul	2022	Helsingfors Segelsallskap (HSS)	Helsinki	Finland	121	25	4	
53	26May -2Jun	2023	Nautical Club of Kavala	Nea Iraklitsa	Greece	145	26	5	
54	7-14 Jun	2024	Centro Velico Punta Ala asd	Punta Ala	Italy	285	29	5	
55	15-20 Jun	2025	Royal Yacht Club Hollandia	Medemblik	Netherlands	301	28	6	
56	23-27 Feb	2026	Royal Queensland Yacht Squadron	Brisbane	Australia	101	15	3	

== Multiple World Champions ==
Compiled from the data below the table includes up to and including 20XX.

Ranking	Sailor	Gold	Silver	Bronze	Total	No. Entries*	Ref.
1	Michal Maier (CZE)	6	1	1	8	13	
2	Lawrence Lemieux (CAN)	5	2	1	8	8	
3	Georg Oser (SUI)	3	1	2	6	12	
4	Vladimir Krutskikh (RUS)	3	1	0	4	5	
5	Andre Mevel (FRA)	3	0	2	5	6	
6	Roland Balthasar (GER)	3	0	0	3	14	
7	André Budzien (GER)	2	7	0	9	17	
8	Mel Oskamp (NED)	2	1	1	4	6	
9	Heinrich Unterhauser (ITA)	2	0	0	2	14	
9	Peter Raderschadt (GER)	2	0	0	2	11	
9	John Greenwood (GBR)	2	0	0	2	9	
9	Pieter-Jan Postma (NED)	2	0	0	2	2	

=== Medallists ===
Games	Gold	Silver	Bronze	Ref.
1970	Mel Oskamp (NED)	Othmar Reich (SUI)	Worn Clark (RSA)	
1971	Andreino Menoni (FIN)	Othmar Reich (SUI)	Mel Oskamp (NED)	
1972	Mel Oskamp (NED)	Andreino Menoni (25x17px)	Beda ZINGG (SUI)	
1973	No title awarded insufficient races			
1974	Andre Mevel (FRA)	Mel Oskamp (NED)	Vernon Stratton (GBR)	
1975	Andre Mevel (FRA)	Othmar Reich (SUI)	Erich KASPARETH (ITA)	
1976	Andre Mevel (FRA)	László Zsindely (SUI)	Othmar Reich (SUI)	
1977	Georg Oser (SUI)	Heinz Reiter (GER)	Andre Mevel (FRA)	
1978	Heinz Reiter (GER)	P. LEBOIS (FRA)	Georg Oser (SUI)	
1979	Karel Hruby (CZE)	C. STURM (SUI)	Andre Mevel (FRA)	
1980	Georg Oser (SUI)	Karel Hruby (CZE)	Jiri Maier (CZE)	
1981	György Wossala (HUN)	Georg Oser (SUI)	Frank Roth (SUI)	
1982	Georg Oser (SUI)	Ivan Hoffmann (CZE)	Friedrich MÜLLER (FRG)	
1983	Heinrich UNTERHAUSER (ITA)	Frank Roth (SUI)	Herbert HERWIG (GER)	
1984	Walter Mai (GER)	Palle-Steen LARSEN (DEN)	Friedrich MÜLLER (FRG)	
1985	Jörgen LINDHARDTSEN (DEN)	Klaus Stuffer (ITA)	Henning Wind (DEN)	
1986	Heinrich UNTERHAUSER (ITA)	Klaus Stuffer (ITA)	Georg Oser (SUI)	
1987	Peter Raderschadt (GER)	Walter Mai (GER)	Ivor Ganahl (SUI)	
1988	Hans Fatzer (SUI)	Jiri Outrata (CZE)	Kurt Schimitzek (AUT)	
1989	Peter Raderschadt (GER)	Kurt Schimitzek (AUT)	Mikael Brandt (SWE)	
1990	Mikael Brandt (SWE)	Friedrich MÜLLER (FRG)	Jiri Outrata (CZE)	
1991	Kurt Schimitzek (AUT)	Jochen Lollert (GER)	Hermann Heide (GER)	
1992	Roland Balthasar (FRG)	Hermann Heide (GER)	Peter Vollebregt (NED)	
1993	Peter Vollebregt (NED)	Walter Mai (GER)	Jan BJÖRNBERG (SWE)	
1994	Roland Balthasar (GER)	Jiri OUTRATA (CZE)	Walter Mai (GER)	
1995	Lawrence Lemieux (CAN)	Kurt Schimitzek (AUT)	Wolfgang GerzGER (25x17px)	
1996	Roland Balthasar (GER)	Wolfgang Gerz (GER)	Walter Mai (GER)	
1997	Wolfgang Gerz (GER)	Lawrence Lemieux (CAN)	Minski Fabris (CRO)	
1998	Lawrence Lemieux (CAN)	Minski Fabris (CRO)	Wolfgang GerzGER (25x17px)	
1999	Lawrence Lemieux (CAN)	Greg Davis (RSA) RSAGD1	Jean Paul Gaston (FRA)FRAJG32	
2000	John Greenwood (GBR)	Lawrence Lemieux (CAN)	Andrew Cooper (GBR)	
2001	Lawrence Lemieux (CAN)	Hein Pieter Okker (NED)	Eberhard Bieberitz (GER)|	
2002	John Greenwood (GBR)	Minski Fabris (CRO)	Lawrence Lemieux (CAN)	
2003	Eberhard Bieberitz (GER)	André Budzien (GER)	Roman Teply (ITA)	
2004	Lawrence Lemieux (CAN)	André Budzien (GER)	Michael Gubi (AUT)	
2005	Silvio Santoni (ITA)	André Budzien (GER)	Allen Burrell (GBR)	
2006	Michal Maier (CZE)	André Budzien (GER)	Michael Gubi (AUT)	
2007	André Budzien (GER)	Agustin JUAREZ MARRERO (ESP)	Allen Burrell (GBR)	
2008	André Budzien (GER)	Mihail Kopanov (BUL)	Han Bergsma (NED)	
2009	André Budzien (GER)	Jürgen Eiermann (GER)	Laurent Hay (FRA)	
2010	Michal Maier (CZE)	André Budzien (GER)	Christen Christoph (SUI)	
2011	Michal Maier (CZE)	Allen Burrell (GBR)	Uli Breuer (GER)	
2012	Michal Maier (CZE)	Allen Burrell (GBR)	Laurent Hay (FRA)	
2013	Michal Maier (CZE)	André Budzien (GER)	Erik Lidesic (USA)	
2014	Michal Maier (CZE)	André Budzien (GER)	Aleksandr Kuliukin (RUS)	
2015	Vladimir Krutskikh (RUS)	Dmitry Petrov (RUS)	Giacomo Giovanelli (ITA)	
2016	Rafael Trujillo (ESP)	Vladimir Krutskikh (RUS)	Michal Maier (CZE)	
2017	Vladimir Krutskikh (RUS)	Laurent Hay (FRA)	Rafael Trujillo (ESP)	
2018	José Luis Doreste (ESP)	Antonio Poncell (CHI)	Giacomo Giovanelli (ITA)	
2019	Vladimir Krutskikh (RUS)	Michal Maier (CZE)	Laurent Hay (FRA)	
2020	Cancelled COVID-19			
2021	Cancelled COVID-19			
2021	Valérian Lebrun (FRA)	Filipe Silva (POR)	David Terol (ESP)	
2022	Pieter Jan Postma (NED)	Laurent Hay (FRA)	Peter Peet (NED)	
2023	Filipe Silva (POR)	Laurent Hay (FRA)	Peter Mosny (SVK)	
2024	Laurent Hay (FRA)	Valérian Lebrun (FRA)	Martijn Van Muyden (NED)	
2025	Pieter Jan Postma (NED)	Laurent Hay (FRA)	Taras Havrysh (UKR)	
2026	Brendan Casey (AUS)	Rafael Trujillo Villar (NED)	Karl Purdie (NZL)	
World Sailing SailorID / Reference

== See also ==
- Finn World Championship
- Finn Junior World Championship
