= Sailing at the 1984 Summer Olympics – Finn =

Sailing at the Olympics

Finn class at the Games of the XXIII Olympiad
- Finn class dinghy
- Venue: Long Beach
- Dates: 31 July to 8 August
- Competitors: 28 from 28 nations
- Teams: 28

Medalists
1st place, gold medalist(s)		Russell Coutts	New Zealand
2nd place, silver medalist(s)		John Bertrand	United States
3rd place, bronze medalist(s)		Terry Neilson	Canada

The Finn was a sailing event on the Sailing at the 1984 Summer Olympics program in Long Beach, Los Angeles County, California . Seven races were scheduled. 28 sailors, on 28 boats, from 28 nations competed.

== Results ==
Rank	Helmsman (Country)	Race I		Race II		Race III		Race IV		Race V		Race VI		Race VII		Total Points	Total -1
Rank	Helmsman (Country)	Rank	Points	Rank	Points	Rank	Points	Rank	Points	Rank	Points	Rank	Points	Rank	Points	Total Points	Total -1
1st place, gold medalist(s)	Russell Coutts (NZL)	1	0.0	7	13.0	2	3.0	2	3.0	~~21~~	~~27.0~~	3	5.7	5	10.0	61.7	34.7
2nd place, silver medalist(s)	John Bertrand (USA)	~~DSQ~~	~~35.0~~	5	10.0	1	0.0	1	0.0	2	3.0	5	10.0	8	14.0	72.0	37.0
3rd place, bronze medalist(s)	Terry Neilson (CAN)	2	3.0	2	3.0	5	10.0	~~14~~	~~20.0~~	5	10.0	1	0.0	6	11.7	57.7	37.7
4	Joaquín Blanco (ESP)	~~DSQ~~	~~35.0~~	8	14.0	18	24.0	4	8.0	6	11.7	2	3.0	1	0.0	95.7	60.7
5	Wolfgang Gerz (FRG)	5	10.0	6	11.7	8	14.0	7	13.0	3	5.7	6	11.7	~~DNF~~	~~35.0~~	101.1	66.1
6	Chris Pratt (AUS)	7	13.0	4	8.0	~~12~~	~~18.0~~	9	15.0	1	0.0	9	15.0	11	17.0	86.0	68.0
7	Michael Mcintyre (GBR)	13	19.0	~~15~~	~~21.0~~	4	8.0	6	11.7	4	8.0	10	16.0	4	8.0	91.7	70.7
8	Jorge Zarif Neto (BRA)	8	14.0	1	0.0	6	11.7	~~19~~	~~25.0~~	11	17.0	15	21.0	9	15.0	103.7	78.7
9	Mark Neeleman (NED)	9	15.0	9	15.0	7	13.0	~~DSQ~~	~~35.0~~	10	16.0	11	17.0	3	5.7	116.7	81.7
10	Ingvar Bengtsson (SWE)	10	16.0	22	28.0	10	16.0	~~23~~	~~29.0~~	7	13.0	4	8.0	2	3.0	113.0	84.0
11	Peter Holmberg (ISV)	11	17.0	~~19~~	~~25.0~~	3	5.7	15	21.0	8	14.0	7	13.0	10	16.0	111.7	86.7
12	Lasse Hjortnæs (DEN)	~~19~~	~~25.0~~	11	17.0	13	19.0	3	5.7	13	19.0	14	20.0	7	13.0	118.7	93.7
13	Bill O'Hara (IRL)	4	8.0	10	16.0	9	15.0	8	14.0	~~22~~	~~28.0~~	19	25.0	12	18.0	124.0	96.0
14	Esko Rechardt (FIN)	6	11.7	12	18.0	16	22.0	12	18.0	9	15.0	~~DNF~~	~~35.0~~	15	21.0	140.7	105.7
15	Paolo Semeraro (ITA)	3	5.7	~~26~~	~~32.0~~	15	21.0	10	16.0	20	26.0	13	19.0	13	19.0	138.7	106.7
16	Armanto Ortolano (GRE)	14	20.0	3	5.7	14	20.0	13	19.0	15	21.0	17	23.0	~~DNF~~	~~35.0~~	143.7	108.7
17	Luc Choley (FRA)	12	18.0	21	27.0	~~22~~	~~28.0~~	17	23.0	12	18.0	12	18.0	14	20.0	152.0	124.0
18	Eric Mergenthaler (MEX)	18	24.0	20	26.0	11	17.0	11	17.0	14	20.0	16	22.0	~~22~~	~~28.0~~	154.0	126.0
19	Juan Maegli (GUA)	16	22.0	16	22.0	~~20~~	~~26.0~~	20	26.0	16	22.0	8	14.0	17	23.0	155.0	129.0
20	Jean-Marc Holder (TRI)	~~21~~	~~27.0~~	14	20.0	17	23.0	5	10.0	24	30.0	20	26.0	19	25.0	161.0	131.0
21	Per Arne Nilsen (NOR)	15	21.0	13	19.0	DSQ	35.0	16	22.0	17	23.0	18	24.0	18	24.0	168	133.0
22	Philippe Willems (BEL)	17	23.0	17	23.0	19	25.0	18	24.0	18	24.0	~~PMS~~	~~35.0~~	16	22.0	176.0	141.0
23	Guy Grossmith (ZIM)	20	26.0	18	24.0	~~21~~	~~27.0~~	22	28.0	19	25.0	21	27.0	20	26.0	183.0	155.0
24	Arshad Choudhry (PAK)	22	28.0	24	30.0	~~23~~	~~29.0~~	21	27.0	23	29.0	22	28.0	21	27.0	198.0	168.0
25	Tu Guangming (CHN)	23	29.0	23	29.0	24	30.0	24	30.0	25	31.0	~~PMS~~	~~35.0~~	23	29.0	213.0	178.0
26	David Ashby (FIJ)	25	31.0	25	31.0	26	32.0	25	31.0	26	32.0	23	29.0	~~25~~	~~31.0~~	217.0	185.0
27	Derek Hudson (BOT)	24	30.0	27	33.0	25	31.0	26	32.0	27	33.0	~~DNF~~	~~35.0~~	24	30.0	224.0	189.0
28	Nasser Karam (EGY)	~~DNF~~	~~35.0~~	28	34.0	27	33.0	27	33.0	28	34.0	24	30.0	DNF	35.0	234.0	199.0

DNF = Did Not Finish, DSQ = Disqualified, PMS = Premature Start
Crossed out results did not count for the total result.
= Male, = Female

=== Daily standings ===
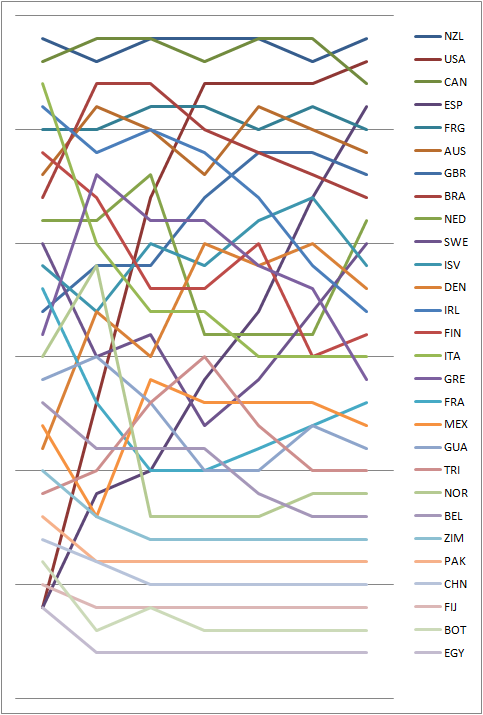
Graph showing the daily standings in the Finn during the 1984 Summer Olympics

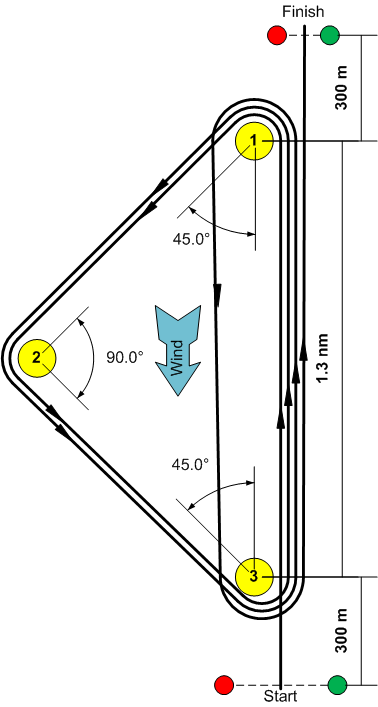
Finn Course Map
