= 2006 Finn European Championship =

Official logo

The 2006 Finn Open European Championship was held at the Club de Vela Palamós in Palamós, Catalonia, Spain between September 22 and September 30, 2006.

== Results ==
Results of individual races
| Pos | Helmsman | Country | Pts |
|---|---|---|---|
| Gold medal | Edward Wright | Great Britain | 25 |
| Silver medal | Guillaume Florent | France | 31 |
| Bronze medal | Marin Mišura | Croatia | 42 |
| 4 | Gasper Vincec | Slovenia | 52 |
| 5 | Jonas Høgh-Christensen | Denmark | 56 |
| 6 | Rafael Trujillo Villar | Spain | 63 |
| 7 | Johan Tillander | Sweden | 64 |
| 8 | Ivan Kljaković Gašpić | Croatia | 70 |
| 9 | Anthony Nossiter | Australia | 76 |
| 10 | Ismael Bruno | France | 89 |
| 11 | Chris Cook | Canada | 71 |
| 12 | Peer Moberg | Norway | 98 |
| 13 | Søren Holm | Denmark | 100 |
| 14 | Tapio Nirkko | Finland | 103 |
| 15 | Waclaw Szukiel | Poland | 106 |
| 16 | Florian Raudaschl | Austria | 107 |
| 17 | Rafal Szukiel | Poland | 109 |
| 18 | Daniel Birgmark | Sweden | 110 |
| 19 | Pieter-Jan Postma | Netherlands | 133 |
| 20 | Matt Howard | Great Britain | 133 |

Legend: – Qualified for medal race(s);

^{^} Top 10 qualified for medals race, resulting in a lower score for 11th placed Cook.
