= OK Dinghy World Championship =

World Championship in the OK Dinghy Class

The OK Dinghy World Championship is an annual international sailing regatta for OK Dinghy, they are organized by the host club on behalf of the International OK Dinghy Class Association and recognized by World Sailing, the sports IOC recognized governing body. The class gained world sailing status in 1972 although it did hold international regatta for the decade before.

== Editions ==
Ed.			Host			Participant					Ref
		Year	Host club	Location	Nat.	No.			Nat.	Cont.	Ref
1	-	1973		Falmouth, Cornwall	United Kingdom						
2	-	1974		Adelaide	Australia	63			11	4	
3	-	1975		Helsinki	Finland						
4	-	1976		Nyköping	Sweden						
5	-	1977		Takapuna	New Zealand	66			7	2	
6	-	1978		Medemblik	Netherlands						
7	-	1979		Tønsberg	Norway						
8	-	1980		Varberg	Sweden						
9	-	1981		Hyères	France						
10	-	1982	Black Rock Yacht Club	Black Rock, Victoria	Australia	79			10	2	
11	-	1983		Torquay	United Kingdom	79			10	2	
12	1-11 Aug	1984	Sonderborg Yacht-Club	Sønderborg	Denmark						
13	-	1985		Medemblik	Netherlands						
14	-	1986		Takapuna	New Zealand						
15	-	1987		Luleå	Sweden						
16	-	1988		Travemünde	Germany	74			11	2	
17	-	1989		Weymouth	United Kingdom						
18	-	1990		Melbourne	Australia						
19	-	1991		Vallensbæk	Denmark						
20	-	1992		Vitrolles, Bouches-du-Rhône	France	65			10	2	
21	-	1993		Puck, Poland	Poland	79			9	2	
22	-	1994		Napier, New Zealand	New Zealand						
23	-	1995	Felixstowe Ferry Sailing Club	Felixstowe	United Kingdom						
24	-	1996		Varberg	Sweden						
25	-	1997		Sonderborg	Denmark						
26	-	1998		Glenelg	Australia						
27	-	1999	Neustadter Segler-Verin	Neustadt in Holstein	Germany						
28	5-11 Aug	2000		Łeba	Poland	69			11	3	
29	6-10 Aug	2001		Båstad	Sweden	78			12	3	
30	12-19 Jan	2002	Napier Sailing Club	Napier	New Zealand	78			10	3	
31	-	2003	Cidade De Goa Beach Resort	Goa	India	25			7	3	
32	25-30 Jul	2004	Parkstone Yacht Club	Poole, Dorset	United Kingdom	81			9	3	
33	25-30 Jul	2005	Bisserup Sejlklub	Skælskør	Denmark	62			8	2	
34	13-17 Feb	2006	Belmont 16ft Sailing Club	Belmont, Lake Macquarie	Australia	77			7	2	
35	21-27 Jul	2007		Łeba	Poland	119			8	2	
36	8-12 Jul	2008		Warnemünde	Germany	89			7	2	
37	23–31 July	2009	Seglarklubben Kaparen	Kalmar	Sweden	71			10	3	
38	6–12 February	2010	Royal Port Nicholson Yacht Club	Wellington	New Zealand	71			7	2	
39	24-28 Jul	2011	Largs Sailing Club	Largs	United Kingdom	65			11	3	
40	21-28 Jul	2012	Vallensbæk Sejlklub	Vallensbæk Strand	Denmark	142			11	3	
41	30Mar -5Apr	2013	Royal Varuna Yacht Club	Pattaya	Thailand	73	71	2	9	3	
42	28 Dec -4 Jan	2014	Black Rock Yacht Club, Australia	Black Rock, Victoria	Australia	77	76	1	6	3	
43	24 Jul -1 Aug	2015	MOKSiR Puck	Puck	Poland	91	89	2	8	2	
44	22-29 Jul	2016	Société des Régates de Saint Pierre	Quiberon, Morbihan, Brittany	France	107	18	3	10	2	
45	25–31 May	2017	Barbados Yacht Club	Bridgetown, Barbados	Barbados	78	33	4	8	2	
46	-	2018	Warnemünder Woche	Warnemünde	Germany	120	22	2	10	2	
47	7-15 Feb	2019	Wakatere Boating Club	Auckland	New Zealand	111	108	3	8	3	
N/A	7-17 Aug	2020	Marstrand Sailing Association	Marstrand	Sweden	Cancelled due to COVID					
N/A	23-30 Jul	2021	Circolo Vela Arco	Lake Garda	Italy	Cancelled due to COVID					
48	5-12 Aug	2022	Marstrand Sailing Club	Marstrand	Sweden	109	107	2	12	3	
49	22-30 Jun	2023	Lyme Regis Sailing Club	Lyme Regis	United Kingdom	72	72	0	10	3	
50	24Feb -3Mar	2024	Royal Queensland Yacht Squadron	Manly, Brisbane, QL	Australia	109	108	1	7	2	
51	12-19 Sept	2025	Circolo Vela Arco	Lake Garda	Italy	210	206	4	17	4	
52	5-12 June	2026	Royal Danish Yacht Club	Lake Garda	Denmark	203			15	4	

== Multiple world champions ==
Compiled from the data below the table includes up to and including 2026.

Ranking	Sailor	Gold	Silver	Bronze	Total	No. Entries*	Ref.
1	Nick Craig (GBR)	6	5	2	11	23	
2	Bo-Steffan Andersson (SWE)	4	3	0	7	8	
3	Leith Armit (NZL)	4	1	1	6	8	
4	Roger Blasse (AUS)	2	0	3	5	17	
5	André Budzien (GER)	3	0	0	3	8	
5	Poul Kirketerp (DEN)	3	0	0	3	3	
7	Karsten Hitz (GER)	2	1	1	4	17	
7	Karl Purdie (NZL)	2	1	1	4	5	
9	Jim Hunt (GBR)	2	1	0	3	6	
10	Björn Førslund (SWE)	2	0	0	2	4	
10	Richard Dodson (NZL)	2	0	0	2	3	

- Some years full results are not known so this may be an underestimation

== Medalists ==
Year	Gold	Silver	Bronze	Ref.
1973 Falmouth	Clive Roberts (NZL)	Kjell Axerot (SWE)	John Dawson-Edwards (GBR)	
1974 Adelaide	Torben Andrup (DEN)	Jørgen Lindhardsen (DEN)	Graeme Woodroffe (NZL)	
1975 Helsinki	Poul Kirketerp (DEN)	Peter Lester (NZL)	Hans-Peter Hylander (SWE)	
1976 Nyköping	Poul Kirketerp (DEN)	Johan Ling-Vannerus (SWE)	Michael Nissen (FRG)	
1977 Takapuna	Peter Lester (NZL)	Barry Thom (NZL)	Michael Nissen (FRG)	
1978 Medemblik	Jørgen Lindhardsen (DEN)	Leith Armit (NZL)	Alexander Hagen (FRG)	
1979 Tønsberg	Richard Dodson (NZL)	Christer Berndtsson (SWE)	Clive Evison (GBR)	
1980 Varberg	Poul Kirketerp (DEN)	Jens-Peter Wrede (FRG)	Stefan Järudd (SWE)	
1981 Hyères	Peter Gale (AUS)	Stefan Järudd (SWE)	Earl Berry (NZL)	
1982 Melbourne	Richard Dodson (NZL)	Stefan Järudd (SWE)	Peter Takle (AUS)	
1983 Torquay	Leith Armit (NZL)	Stig Westergaard (DEN)	Trevor Gore (GBR)	
1984 Sønderborg	Glen Collings (AUS)	Stig Westergaard (DEN)	John Derbyshire (GBR)	
1985 Medemblik	Leith Armit (NZL)	Reemt Reemtsma (FRG)	Mark Fisher (AUS)	
1986 Takapuna	Mark Fisher (AUS)	P. Meo (NZL)	Leith Armit (NZL)	
1987 Luleå	Mats Caap (SWE)	Bo-Staffan Andersson (SWE)	Dennis Josefsson (SWE)	
1988 Travemünde	Bo-Staffan Andersson (SWE)	Bjørn Westergaard (DEN)	Dennis Josefsson (SWE)	
1989 Weymouth	Per Hägglund (SWE)	Bo-Staffan Andersson (SWE)	Peter Josefsson (SWE)	
1990 Melbourne	Leith Armit (NZL)	Per Hägglund (SWE)	Mark Fisher (AUS)	
1991 Vallensbæk	Bo-Staffan Andersson (SWE)	Ulf Brandt (DEN)	Hedley Fletcher (GBR)	
1992 Vitrolles	Bo-Staffan Andersson (SWE)	Anders Adersen (DEN)	Ulf Brand (DEN)	
1993 Puck	Bo-Staffan Andersson (SWE)	Mateusz Kusznierewicz (POL)	Hedley Fletcher (GBR)	
1994 Napier	Leith Armit (NZL)	Mateusz Kusznierewicz (POL)	Roger Blasse (AUS)	
1995 Felixstowe	Björn Forslund (SWE)	Jørgen Lindhardsen (DEN)	Ulf Brandt (DEN)	
1996 Varberg	Christian Carlson (SWE)	Hedley Fletcher (GBR)	Martin von Zimmermann (GER)	
1997 Sonderborg	Björn Forslund (SWE)	Karsten Hitz (GER)	Hedley Fletcher (GBR)	
1998 Glenelg	Roger Blasse (AUS)	Carl Schmidt (AUS)	Karsten Hitz (GER)	
1999 Neustadt in Holstein	Peter Milne (AUS)	Jørgen Lindhardsen (DEN)	Nick Craig (GBR)	
2000 Łeba	Karsten Hitz (GER)	Nick Craig (GBR)	Bart Bomans (BEL)	
2001 Båstad	Karsten Hitz (GER)	Bart Bomans (BEL)	Thomas Hansson-Mild (SWE)	
2002 Napier	Greg Wilcox (NZL)	Paul Rhodes (NZL)	Alistair Gair (NZL)	
2003 Goa	Nintin Mongia (IND)	Ben Morisson (NZL)	Nick Craig (GBR)	
2004 Poole	Jim Hunt (GBR)	Nick Craig (GBR)	Nintin Mongia (IND)	
2005 Skælskør	Nick Craig (GBR)	Jonas Quist (SWE)	Greg Wilcox (NZL)	
2006 Belmont	Nick Craig (GBR)	Jørgen Lindhardsen (DEN)	Greg Wilcox (NZL)	
2007 Łeba	Nick Craig (GBR)	Mark Perrow (NZL)	Karl Purdie (NZL)	
2008 Warnemünde	Karl Purdie (NZL)	Nick Craig (GBR)	Andre Blasse (AUS)	
2009 Kalmar	Thomas Hansson-Mild (SWE)	Karl Purdie (NZL)	Jørgen Lindhardsten (DEN)	
2010 Wellington	Karl Purdie (NZL)	Michael Williams (AUS)	Matthew Steven (NZL)	
2011 Largs	Nick Craig (GBR)	Martin von Zimmermann (GER)	Thomas Hansson-Mild (SWE)	
2012 Vallensbæk	André Budzien (GER)	Greg Wilcox (NZL)	Thomas Hansson-Mild (SWE)	
2013 Pattaya	Roger Blasse (AUS)	Nick Craig (GBR)	Michael Williams (AUS)	
2014 Melbourne	Matt Stechmann (NZL)	Luke O'Connell (NZL)	Roger Blasse (AUS)	
2015 Puck	André Budzien (GER)	Charlie Cumbley (GBR)	Bo Petersen (DEN)	
2016 Saint-Pierre-Quiberon	Jim Hunt (GBR)	Jørgen Svendsen (DEN)	Charlie Cumbley (GBR)	
2017 Barbados	Nick Craig (GBR)	Jim Hunt (GBR)	Luke O'Connell (NZL)	
2018 Warnemünde	André Budzien (GER)	Fredrik Lööf (SWE)	Jan Kurfeld (GER)	
2019 Auckland	Dan Slater (NZL)	Fredrik Lööf (SWE)	Josh Armit (NZL)	
2020 Marstrand	Cancelled due to COVID 19			
2021 Lake Garda	Cancelled due to COVID 19			
2022 Marstrand	Charlie Cumbley (GBR)	Niklas Edler (SWE)	Lars Johan Brodtkorb (NOR)	
2023 Lyme Regis	GBR 2245; Henry Wetherell (GBR)	SWE 71; Niklas Edler (SWE)	FRA 11; Valerian Lebrun (FRA)	
2024	GBR 2261; Nick Craig (GBR)	GBR 11; Andy Davis (GBR)	AUS 1 Roger Blasse (AUS)	
2025	GBR-94; Andrew Mills (GBR)	GBR-2295; Nick Craig (GBR)	SWE-71; Niklas Edler (SWE)	
2026	DEN-1533; Johan Schubert (DEN)	BEL-112; Wannes van Laer (BEL)	GBR-2298; Matthew Howard (GBR)	

== International regattas ==
Year	Gold	Silver	Bronze	Ref.
1963 Maubuisson	Sven Jakobsen (DEN)	Bert de Bock (BEL)	Guy Lachapelle (BEL)	
1964 Roskilde	Henning Schnachtschnabel (DEN)	Bent Jørgensen (DEN)	Christen Tang Koch (DEN)	
1965 Hayling Island	Göran Andersson (SWE)	Bent Jørgensen (DEN)	Roy Martyn (GBR)	
1966 Veerse Meer	Göran Andersson (SWE)	Björn Arnesson (SWE)	Ib Ussing Andersen (DEN)	
1967 Lake Saint-Louis	Björn Arnesson (SWE)	Erik Fromell (SWE)	Göran Andersson (SWE)	
1968 Tønsberg	Erik Fromell (SWE)	Leif Enarsson (SWE)	Per Westlund (SWE)	
1969 Bendor	Kent Carlsson (SWE)	Ib Ussing Andersen (DEN)	Erik Fromell (SWE)	
1970 Takapuna	Kent Carlsson (SWE)	Thomas Jungblut (FRG)	Jonty Farmer (NZL)	
1971 Kiel	Thomas Jungblut (FRG)	Peter Due (DEN)	Steen Kjølhede (DEN)	
1972 Marstrand	Kjell Axerot (SWE)	Graeme Woodroffe (NZL)	Per Wennersten (SWE)	
