= Sailing at the 1960 Summer Olympics – Finn =

Sailing at the Olympics

Finn at the Games of the XVII Olympiad
- Olympic Configuration 1960
- Venue: Naples
- Competitors: 35 from 35 nations
- Teams: 35

Medalists
1st place, gold medalist(s)		Paul Elvstrøm	Denmark
2nd place, silver medalist(s)		Aleksander Tšutšelov	Soviet Union
3rd place, bronze medalist(s)		André Nelis	Belgium

The Finn was a sailing event on the Sailing at the 1960 Summer Olympics program in Naples. Seven races were scheduled. 35 sailors, on 35 boats, from 35 nations competed.

== Results ==
Rank	Helmsman (Country)	Hull Sail No.	Race I		Race II		Race III		Race IV		Race V		Race VI		Race VII		Total Points	Total -1
Rank	Helmsman (Country)	Hull Sail No.	Rank	Points	Rank	Points	Rank	Points	Rank	Points	Rank	Points	Rank	Points	Rank	Points	Total Points	Total -1
1st place, gold medalist(s)	Paul Elvstrøm (DEN)	167	1	1645	5	946	1	1645	2	1344	5	946	1	1645	~~DNS~~	~~0~~	8171	8171
2nd place, silver medalist(s)	Aleksander Tšutšelov (URS)	163	7	800	1	1645	2	1344	~~10~~	~~645~~	17	415	2	1344	8	742	6935	6520
3rd place, bronze medalist(s)	André Nelis (BEL)	145	2	1344	2	1344	~~12~~	~~566~~	24	265	3	1168	15	469	4	1043	6199	5934
4	Ronald Jenyns (AUS)	148	6	867	6	867	~~DNF~~	~~101~~	6	867	2	1344	3	1168	10	645	5859	5758
5	Reinaldo Conrad (BRA)	165	~~15~~	~~469~~	3	1168	10	645	1	1645	10	645	18	390	11	604	5566	5176
6	Ralph Roberts (NZL)	147	16	441	~~DSQ~~	~~0~~	6	867	8	742	7	800	5	946	2	1344	5140	5140
7	Ian Bruce (CAN)	152	3	1168	8	742	~~DNF~~	~~101~~	7	800	25	247	13	531	1	1645	5234	5133
8	Kenneth H. E. Albury (BAH)	144	12	566	~~29~~	~~183~~	11	604	5	946	1	1645	7	800	13	531	5275	5092
9	Yves-Louis Pinaud (FRA)	142	5	946	7	800	5	946	12	566	~~DSQ~~	~~0~~	4	1043	22	303	4604	4604
10	Ante Pivčević (YUG)	159	4	1043	14	499	3	1168	17	415	19	366	6	867	~~21~~	~~323~~	4681	4358
11	Peter Jones Barrett (USA)	153	~~DNF~~	~~101~~	17	415	7	800	11	604	6	867	20	344	5	946	4077	3976
12	Vernon Stratton (GBR)	166	8	742	4	1043	15	469	16	441	13	531	10	645	~~23~~	~~283~~	4154	3871
13	Per Jordbakke (NOR)	168	~~DNF~~	~~101~~	16	441	18	390	9	691	9	691	8	742	6	867	3923	3822
14	Bruno Trani (ITA)	154	9	691	9	691	17	415	27	214	8	742	~~DNF~~	~~101~~	7	800	3654	3553
15	Hélder d'Oliveira (POR)	155	11	604	10	645	8	742	~~29~~	~~183~~	14	499	14	499	14	499	3671	3488
16	Jouko Valli (FIN)	169	14	499	26	230	~~DNF~~	~~101~~	18	390	12	566	12	566	3	1168	3520	3419
17	Hans-Peter Fürst (AUT)	173	19	366	12	566	13	531	4	1043	11	604	22	303	~~28~~	~~198~~	3611	3413
18	John Somers Payne (IRL)	175	~~26~~	~~230~~	18	390	14	499	13	531	4	1043	24	265	16	441	3399	3169
19	Ricardo Boneo (ARG)	180	21	323	15	469	9	691	3	1168	22	303	~~DSQ~~	~~0~~	DNS	0	2954	2954
20	Hans Kämmerer (EUA)	156	10	645	~~25~~	~~247~~	16	441	25	247	18	390	21	323	9	691	2984	2737
21	Gonzalo Fernández de Córdoba Larios (ESP)	161	22	303	~~DNF~~	~~101~~	4	1043	22	303	21	323	17	415	30	168	2656	2555
22	Ioannis Karyofyllis (GRE)	143	20	344	11	604	~~DSQ~~	~~0~~	15	469	24	265	9	691	32	140	2513	2513
23	Yasuo Hozumi (JPN)	171	28	198	13	531	20	344	14	499	15	469	~~29~~	~~183~~	24	265	2489	2306
24	Hans Sleeswijk (NED)	170	13	531	20	344	24	265	~~32~~	~~140~~	20	344	19	366	17	415	2405	2265
25	Kálmán Tolnai (HUN)	150	17	415	~~28~~	~~198~~	25	247	19	366	27	214	11	604	27	214	2258	2060
26	Louis Schiess (SUI)	146	24	265	22	303	21	323	26	230	16	441	23	283	~~29~~	~~183~~	2028	1845
27	Ersin Demir (TUR)	160	18	390	27	214	23	283	~~31~~	~~154~~	23	283	25	247	19	366	1937	1783
28	Thore Göran Andersson (SWE)	172	~~DNF~~	~~101~~	30	168	22	303	23	283	30	168	26	230	12	566	1819	1718
29	Daniel Mackenzie (KEN)	149	25	247	21	323	26	230	~~28~~	~~198~~	34	114	16	441	25	247	1800	1686
30	Maung Maung Lwin (BIR)	164	27	214	23	283	30	168	~~34~~	~~114~~	31	154	30	168	15	469	1570	1456
31	El-Moustafa Haddad (MAR)	151	30	168	19	366	28	198	30	168	~~33~~	~~127~~	28	198	20	344	1569	1442
32	Brownlow Gray (BER)	141	29	183	~~DNF~~	~~101~~	29	183	21	323	32	140	27	214	18	390	1534	1433
33	Gordon Burn-Wood (RSA)	162	23	283	31	154	19	366	~~33~~	~~127~~	26	230	31	154	26	230	1544	1417
34	Alfred Borda (MLT)	158	31	154	24	265	27	214	20	344	29	183	~~DNF~~	~~101~~	31	154	1415	1314
35	Pierre Arbaji (LIB)	157	32	140	32	140	31	154	35	101	28	198	DNF	101	~~DNS~~	~~0~~	834	834

DNF = Did Not Finish, DNS= Did Not Start, DSQ = Disqualified
= Male, = Female

=== Daily standings ===
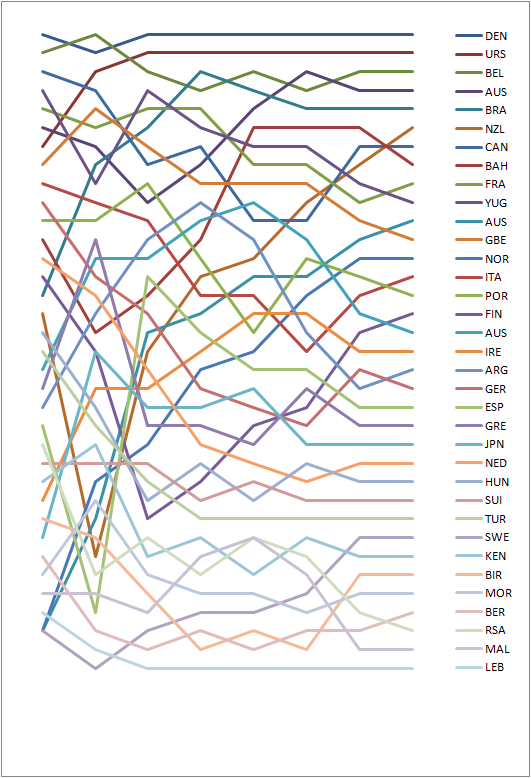
Graph showing the daily standings in the Finn during the 1960 Summer Olympics

== Conditions at Naples ==
Of the total of three race areas were needed during the Olympics in Naples. Each of the classes was using the same scoring system. The Northern course was used for the Finn.

Date	Race	Sea	Wind direction	Wind speed (m/s)
29 August 1960	I	Calm	SSW	4-5
30 August 1960	II	Calm	SW	3
31 August 1960	III	Slightly rough	W	6-8
1 September 1960	IV	Calm	SW	3-4
5 September 1960	V	Calm	SSW	6.5-7
6 September 1960	VI	Sea force two	WSW	7
7 September 1960	VII	Sea force 1.5	SW	6.5-7
