= Joaquín Blanco Roca =

Spanish sailor

Joaquín Blanco
Personal information
- Full name: Joaquín Blanco Roca
- Nationality: Spanish
- Born: 22 November 1957 (age 68)
- Height: 190 cm (6 ft 3 in)
- Weight: 85 kg (187 lb)

Sailing career
- Sport: Sailing
- Club: Real Club Náutico de Gran Canaria
- Class: Finn
Medal record
Sailing
Representing Spain
Finn World Championships
| Bronze medal – third place | 1997 Palamós | Finn |

Joaquín Blanco Roca (born 22 November 1957) is a Spanish Olympic sailor in the Finn class. He competed in the 1984 Summer Olympics, where he finished 4th in Finn.

He is the father of Olympic sailor Joaquín Blanco Albalat.

== Career ==
Blanco, born 1957 in Las Palmas de Gran Canaria, sailed in the Finn class. He won the 1977 Finn Gold Cup competition, but was not awarded the trophy because the International Finn Association withdrew the championship status when Spain refused to accept entries of two South African sailors, however, in 2017, the International Finn Association acknowledged him as winner of the Finn Gold Cup.

He competed in the 1984 Summer Olympics, where he finished 4th in Finn after Russell Coutts, John Bertrand, and Terry Neilson.
