= Sailing at the 1976 Summer Olympics – Finn =

Sailing at the Olympics

Finn class at the Games of the XXI Olympiad
- Finn class dinghy
- Venue: Kingston
- Dates: 19 to 27 July
- Competitors: 28 from 28 nations
- Teams: 28

Medalists
1st place, gold medalist(s)		Jochen Schümann	East Germany
2nd place, silver medalist(s)		Andrey Balashov	Soviet Union
3rd place, bronze medalist(s)		John Bertrand	Australia

The Finn was a sailing event on the Sailing at the 1976 Summer Olympics program in Kingston, Ontario. Seven races were scheduled. 28 sailors, on 28 boats, from 28 nations competed.

== Results ==
Rank	Helmsman (Country)	Race I		Race II		Race III		Race IV		Race V		Race VI		Race VII		Total Points	Total -1
Rank	Helmsman (Country)	Rank	Points	Rank	Points	Rank	Points	Rank	Points	Rank	Points	Rank	Points	Rank	Points	Total Points	Total -1
1st place, gold medalist(s)	Jochen Schümann (GDR)	3	5.7	2	3.0	~~12~~	~~18.0~~	12	18.0	1	0.0	2	3.0	3	5.7	53.4	35.4
2nd place, silver medalist(s)	Andrey Balashov (URS)	4	8.0	4	8.0	~~22~~	~~28.0~~	1	0.0	3	5.7	4	8.0	5	10.0	67.7	39.7
3rd place, bronze medalist(s)	John Bertrand (AUS)	2	3.0	6	11.7	1	0.0	~~22~~	~~28.0~~	5	10.0	5	10.0	6	11.7	74.4	46.4
4	Cláudio Biekarck (BRA)	6	11.7	7	13.0	5	10.0	~~19~~	~~25.0~~	2	3.0	1	0.0	11	17.0	79.7	54.7
5	Kent Carlsson (SWE)	10	16.0	3	5.7	~~23~~	~~29.0~~	10	16.0	14	20.0	3	5.7	2	3.0	95.4	66.4
6	Anastasios Bountouris (GRE)	13	19.0	8	14.0	9	15.0	4	8.0	~~21~~	~~27.0~~	7	13.0	4	8.0	104.0	77.0
7	David Howlett (GBR)	7	13.0	1	0.0	19	25.0	~~23~~	~~29.0~~	22	28.0	6	11.7	1	0.0	106.7	77.7
8	Sanford Riley (CAN)	1	0.0	~~PMS~~	~~37.0~~	8	14.0	20	26.0	9	15.0	8	14.0	8	14.0	120.0	83.0
9	Mauro Pelaschier (ITA)	11	17.0	10	16.0	10	16.0	3	5.7	11	17.0	~~14~~	~~20.0~~	10	16.0	107.7	87.7
10	Serge Maury (FRA)	5	10.0	~~DSQ~~	~~37.0~~	20	26.0	2	3.0	7	13.0	10	16.0	14	20.0	125.0	88.0
11	Peter Commette (USA)	9	15.0	12	18.0	6	11.7	~~14~~	~~20.0~~	13	19.0	13	19.0	7	13.0	115.7	95.7
12	José Luis Doreste (ESP)	20	26.0	15	21.0	2	3.0	8	14.0	6	11.7	17	23.0	~~DNF~~	~~34.0~~	132.7	98.7
13	Minski Fabris (YUG)	8	14.0	9	15.0	13	19.0	16	22.0	~~DSQ~~	~~37.0~~	9	15.0	12	18.0	140.0	103.0
14	Jørgen Lindhardsen (DEN)	15	21.0	11	17.0	11	17.0	~~21~~	~~27.0~~	8	14.0	16	22.0	9	15.0	133.0	106.0
15	Jonty Farmer (NZL)	~~19~~	~~25.0~~	5	10.0	15	21.0	13	19.0	15	21.0	11	17.0	15	21.0	134.0	109.0
16	Ryszard Blaszka (POL)	22	28.0	22	28.0	4	8.0	5	10.0	4	8.0	~~25~~	~~31.0~~	25	31.0	144.0	113.0
17	András Haán (HUN)	16	22.0	20	26.0	3	5.7	~~24~~	~~30.0~~	10	16.0	15	21.0	17	23.0	143.7	113.7
18	Daniel Mújica (MEX)	17	23.0	19	25.0	7	13.0	6	11.7	12	18.0	~~21~~	~~27.0~~	19	25.0	142.7	115.7
19	Richard Grönblom (FIN)	12	18.0	14	20.0	~~21~~	~~27.0~~	15	21.0	18	24.0	18	24.0	18	24.0	158.0	131.0
20	Werner Sülberg (FRG)	21	27.0	17	23.0	~~27~~	~~33.0~~	7	13.0	17	23.0	22	28.0	13	19.0	166.0	133.0
21	Takaharu Hirozawa (JPN)	~~25~~	~~31.0~~	16	22.0	16	22.0	9	15.0	16	22.0	20	26.0	20	26.0	164.0	133.0
22	Jacques Rogge (BEL)	14	20.0	13	19.0	25	31.0	17	23.0	~~DSQ~~	~~37.0~~	12	18.0	21	27.0	175.0	138.0
23	Juan Firpo (ARG)	~~23~~	~~29.0~~	18	24.0	14	20.0	11	17.0	19	25.0	23	29.0	23	29.0	173.0	144.0
24	Tom Skjondberg (NOR)	18	24.0	~~RET~~	~~34.0~~	26	32.0	26	32.0	24	30.0	19	25.0	16	22.0	199.0	165.0
25	Michael Russell (BAH)	27	33.0	21	27.0	18	24.0	18	24.0	23	29.0	~~DNF~~	~~34.0~~	22	28.0	199.0	165.0
26	Howard Lee (BER)	26	32.0	RET	34.0	17	23.0	~~DSQ~~	~~37.0~~	20	26.0	24	30.0	24	30.0	212.0	175.0
27	Art Andrew (ISV)	24	30.0	23	29.0	24	30.0	25	31.0	25	31.0	~~26~~	~~32.0~~	26	32.0	215.0	183.0
28	Mario Almario (PHI)	28	34.0	24	30.0	28	34.0	27	33.0	~~RET~~	~~34.0~~	DNF	34.0	DNF	34.0	233.0	199.0

DNF = Did Not Finish, DNS= Did Not Start, DSQ = Disqualified, PMS = Premature Start, YMP = Yacht Materially Prejudiced
= Male, = Female

=== Daily standings ===
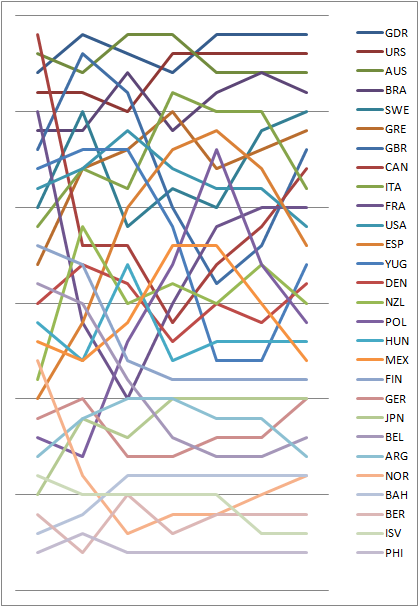
Graph showing the daily standings in the Finn during the 1976 Summer Olympics
