= Hans Sleeswijk =

Dutch sailor (1935–2024)

Personal information
- Full name: Hans Sleeswijk
- Nationality: Dutch
- Born: 31 January 1935 Amsterdam, Netherlands
- Died: 1 January 2024 (aged 88) Lage Vuursche, Netherlands
- Height: 1.83 m (6 ft 0 in)

Sport

Sailing career
- Class: Finn
- Updated on 2024

Hans Sleeswijk (31 January 1935 – 1 January 2024) was a Dutch sailor, who represented his country at the 1960 Summer Olympics in Naples in the Finn. Sleeswijk took the 24th place. In the previous Olympics in Melbourne Sleeswijk was the spare sailor for the Dutch Olympic team. However, after the Soviet invasion in Hungary the Dutch government decided that the Dutch Olympic team would not compete. He also was a professional television- and theatre-producer, the same as his famous father René sr. and his brother René van Vooren. Sleeswijk died on 1 January 2024, at the age of 88.

== Sources ==
- "Hans Sleeswijk Bio, Stats, and Results". Olympic Sports. Sports-Reference.com. Archived from the original on 18 April 2020.
- "Zeilteam voor Melbourne". De Tĳd : godsdienstig-staatkundig dagblad (in Dutch) (Day ed.). 13 July 1956.
- "Olympische sporters 1956 krijgen alsnog erkenning" (in Dutch) (Day ed.). Geschiedenis 24. 3 July 2006.
- "Wij hadden moeten gaan". Nieuwsblad van het Noorden (in Dutch) (Day ed.). 24 December 1956.
- "NEDERLANDS OLYMPISCHE EQUIPE". De Tijd De Maasbode (in Dutch) (Day ed.). 2 August 1960.
- "Sleeswijk toch naar O.S." Nieuwsblad van het Noorden (in Dutch) (Day ed.). 9 August 1960.
- "Weer een goede race van Verhagen Jaap Helder ook aan bod?". Nieuwsblad van het Noorden (in Dutch) (Day ed.). 2 September 1960.
- "The Games of the XVII Olympiad Rome 1960, The Official Report of the Organizing Committee Volume One" (PDF). 1960. Archived from the original (PDF) on 27 October 2012.
- "The Games of the XVII Olympiad Rome 1960, The Official Report of the Organizing Committee Volume Two (a)" (PDF). 1960. Archived from the original (PDF) on 23 May 2011.
- "The Games of the XVII Olympiad Rome 1960, The Official Report of the Organizing Committee Volume Two (b)" (PDF). 1960. Archived from the original (PDF) on 29 October 2012.
