= Björn Forslund =

Björn Forslund may refer to:

- Björn Forslund (sailor)
- Björn Forslund (speed skater)
