= Blaszka =

Blaszka is a surname. Notable people with this surname include:

- Henryk Blaszka (1958–2024), Polish sailor
- Jessica Blaszka (born 1992), retired Dutch wrestler
- Ryszard Blaszka (born 1951), Polish sailor
