= Krutskikh =

Krutskikh (Russian: Крутских) is a Russian surname. Notable people with the surname include:

- Daniil Krutskikh (born 2000), Russian sailor
- Diana Krutskikh (born 1977), Russian sailor
- Vladimir Krutskikh (born 1973), Russian sailor
