= John Bertrand =

John Bertrand may refer to:

- John Bertrand (sailor, born 1946) (born 1946), Australian Olympic and America's Cup sailor
- John Bertrand (sailor, born 1956) (born 1956), American Olympic sailor
