= Art Andrew =

United States Virgin Islands sailor (1931–2012)

Personal information
- Full name: Arthur Lincoln Andrew
- Born: June 12, 1931 St. Louis, Missouri, United States
- Died: August 10, 2012 (aged 81) Saint Thomas, U.S. Virgin Islands

Sailing career
- Sport: Sailing
- Class: Finn
Medal record
Men's sailing
Representing United States Virgin Islands
Central American and Caribbean Games
Gold medal – first place	1974 Santo Domingo	Finn

Arthur Lincoln "Art" Andrew (June 12, 1931 – August 10, 2012) was a sailor who represented the United States Virgin Islands. He competed in the Finn event at the 1976 Summer Olympics.
