= Göran Andersson (sailor, born 1939) =

Swedish sailor (1939–2020)

Personal information
- Full name: Thore Göran Andersson
- Nationality: Swedish
- Born: 4 October 1939 Lysekil, Sweden
- Died: 18 November 2020 (aged 81) Skärhamn, Sweden

Sailing career
- Sport: Sailing
- Club: Marstrands Segelsällskap
- Classes: Finn; OK
Medal record
OK World Championship
Gold medal – first place	1965 Hayling Island	OK class
Gold medal – first place	1966 Veerse Meer	OK class

Thore Göran Andersson (4 October 1939 – 18 November 2020) was a Swedish Olympic sailor and sailmaker.

Born in Lysekil, Göran Andersson represented Marstrands Segelsällskap. Andersson competed in the Finn event at the 1960 Summer Olympics and finished 28th. He continued to the OK class and won two OK World Championship, in 1965 and 1966.

Andersson worked as a sailmaker, founding and running the Marinex loft in Marstrand. In 2020, he was inducted to the Swedish Sailing Federation Hall of Fame as its 12th inductee.

Andersson died on 18 November 2020 in Skärhamn. His yacht club Marstrands Segelsällskap has named an OK regatta named after him, the Göran Andersson Cup.
