= Joaquín Blanco =

Joaquín Blanco may refer to:

- Joaquín Blanco Albalat (born 1989), Spanish Olympic sailor
- Joaquín Blanco Roca (born 1957), Spanish Olympic sailor
