= Jouko Valli =

Finnish sailor

Personal information
- Nationality: Finnish
- Born: 15 December 1939 (age 85); Iitti, Finland

Sport
- Sport: Sailing

Jouko Valli (born 15 December 1939) is a Finnish sailor. He competed in the Finn event at the 1960 Summer Olympics.
