= Eric Mergenthaler =

Mexican sailor (1963–2020)

Personal information
- Born: 2 September 1963
- Died: 15 April 2020 (aged 56) Mexico City, Mexico
- Height: 1.91 m (6 ft 3 in)
- Weight: 86 kg (190 lb)

Sailing career
- Sport: Sailing
- Class: Finn
Medal record
Sailing
Representing Mexico
Finn World Championships
Silver medal – second place	1989 Finn World Championships
Bronze medal – third place	1990 Finn World Championships
Gold medal – first place	1992 Finn World Championships

Eric Mergenthaler (2 September 1963 – 15 April 2020) was a Mexican Olympic sailor. He competed at the highest levels of the sport in the Finn class and won honorific medals in three Finn World Championships, including the golden medal in Cádiz, making him World Champion in 1992. Mergenthaler also represented Mexico in the 1984, 1988, and 1992 Summer Olympic games.

Mergenthaler died on 15 April 2020 following a bicycle accident four days prior in Mexico City. He was 56.
