= Arshad Choudhry =

Pakistani sailor

Personal information
- Nationality: Pakistani
- Born: 15 January 1947 (age 78)

Sport
- Sport: Sailing

Arshad Choudhry (born 15 January 1947) is a Pakistani sailor. He competed in the Finn event at the 1984 Summer Olympics.
