= Ante Pivčević =

Croatian sailor

Personal information
- Nationality: Croatian
- Born: 13 June 1926; Dubrovnik, Yugoslavia
- Died: 18 August 1997 (aged 71); Split, Croatia

Sport
- Sport: Sailing

Ante Pivčević (13 June 1926 – 18 August 1997) was a Croatian sailor. He competed for Yugoslavia in the Finn event at the 1960 Summer Olympics.
