= Derek Hudson (sailor) =

Botswana sailor (born 1936)

Personal information
- Nationality: Botswana
- Born: 1 February 1936 (age 89)

Sport
- Sport: Sailing

Derek Hudson (born 1 February 1936) is a Botswana sailor. He competed in the Finn event at the 1984 Summer Olympics.
