= Vernon Stratton =

British sailor

Vernon Gordon Lennox Stratton (26 October 1927 – 20 August 2011) was a British Olympic sailor.

Stratton was educated at Eton College before doing National Service in the Army. He competed for Great Britain in the 1960 Summer Olympics in Rome – the sailing took place at Naples, competing in the Finn class; later in 1960 he won the Finn Gold Cup.

Stratton was an early pioneer of Finn sailing in the Britain and was involved in starting the British Finn Association. Between 1961 and 1964 he was the Secretary to the International Finn Association; he later became its President in 1964.

He was also three times British Olympic sailing team manager – Acapulco (1968), Kiel (1972) and Tallinn (1980).

== See also ==
- Sailing at the 1960 Summer Olympics – Finn
