= Jan Willem Aten =

Brazilian sailor

Jan Willem Aten (born October 11, 1953) is a Brazilian former Olympic yachtsman in the Star class. He competed in the 1972 Summer Olympics together with Jörg Bruder, where they finished 4th.
