= Ersin Demir (sailor) =

Turkish sailor

Personal information
- Nationality: Turkish
- Born: 19 October 1922 Istanbul, Turkey

Sport
- Sport: Sailing

Ersin Demir (born 19 October 1922) was a Turkish sailor. He competed in the Finn event at the 1960 Summer Olympics.
