= Ioannis Karyofyllis (sailor) =

Greek sailor

Personal information
- Nationality: Greek
- Born: 1 January 1939 (age 86)

Sport
- Sport: Sailing

Ioannis Karyofyllis (born 1 January 1939) is a Greek sailor. He competed in the Finn event at the 1960 Summer Olympics.
