= Alfred Borda =

Maltese sailor (1913–1996)

Personal information
- Full name: Alfred V. Borda
- Nationality: Maltese
- Born: 14 December 1913
- Died: 13 August 1996 (aged 82); Mosta, Malta

Sport
- Sport: Sailing

Alfred Borda (14 December 1913 – 13 August 1996) was a Maltese sailor. He competed in the Finn event at the 1960 Summer Olympics.
