= Michael Russell (sailor) =

Bahamian sailor

Personal information
- Nationality: Bahamian
- Born: 16 December 1949 (age 75)

Sport
- Sport: Sailing

Michael Russell (born 16 December 1949) is a Bahamian sailor. He competed in the Finn event at the 1976 Summer Olympics.
