= Yasuo Hozumi =

Japanese sailor

Yasuo Hozumi 穂積八洲雄
Personal information
- Nationality: Japanese
- Born: 2 September 1936; Ehime, Japan

Sport
- Sport: Sailing

Yasuo Hozumi (穂積八洲雄, Hozumi Yasuo) (born 2 September 1936) was a Japanese sailor. He competed in the Finn event at the 1960 Summer Olympics.
