= Jean-Marc Holder =

Trinidad and Tobago sailor

Personal information
- Nationality: Trinidad and Tobago
- Born: 2 September 1962 (age 62); Port of Spain, Trinidad and Tobago

Sport
- Sport: Sailing

Jean-Marc Holder (born 2 September 1962) is a Trinidad and Tobago sailor. He competed in the Finn event at the 1984 Summer Olympics.
