= Henning Wind =

Danish sailor

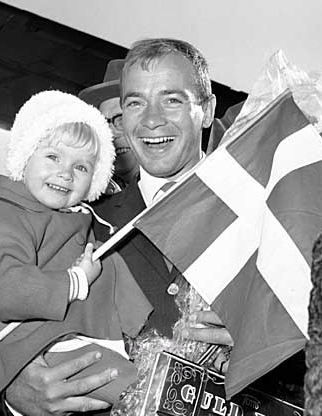
- Wind with daughter in 1964

Personal information
- Full name: Henning Nørgaard Wind
- Born: 19 January 1937 Copenhagen, Denmark
- Died: 20 July 2025 (aged 88)
- Height: 176 cm (5 ft 9 in)
- Weight: 82 kg (181 lb)

Sailing career
- Sport: Sailing
- Club: Hellerup Sejlklub, Gentofte
Medal record
Sailing
Representing Denmark
Olympic Games
Bronze medal – third place	1964 Tokyo	Finn class
Finn Gold Cup
Gold medal – first place	1968 Whitestable	Finn class

Henning Nørgaard Wind (19 January 1937 – 20 July 2025) was a Danish competitive sailor. He competed in the Finn class at the 1964 and 1968 Olympics and placed third and 18th, respectively. He served as the Olympic flag bearer for Denmark in 1964.
