= Pierre Arbaji =

Lebanese sailor (1921–1992)

Personal information
- Nationality: Lebanese
- Born: 1921; Istanbul, Turkey
- Died: 20-03-1992; Beirut

Sport
- Sport: Sailing

Pierre Arbaji (born 1921, died 20 March 1992) was a Lebanese sailor. He competed in the Finn event at the 1960 Summer Olympics and finished in 35th place.
