= Yves-Louis Pinaud =

French sailor

Personal information
- Nationality: French
- Born: 26 March 1927; Bordeaux, France
- Died: 11 April 2008 (aged 81); Annecy, France

Sport
- Sport: Sailing

Yves-Louis Pinaud (26 March 1927 – 11 April 2008) was a French sailor. He competed in the Finn event at the 1960 Summer Olympics.
