= Mateusz Kusznierewicz =

Polish sailor (born 1975)

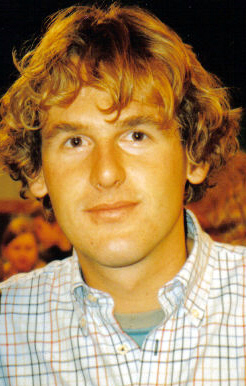
- Kusznierewicz in 2007

Medal record

Men's sailing

Representing Poland

Olympic Games
Gold medal – first place	1996 Atlanta	Finn class
Bronze medal – third place	2004 Athens	Finn class

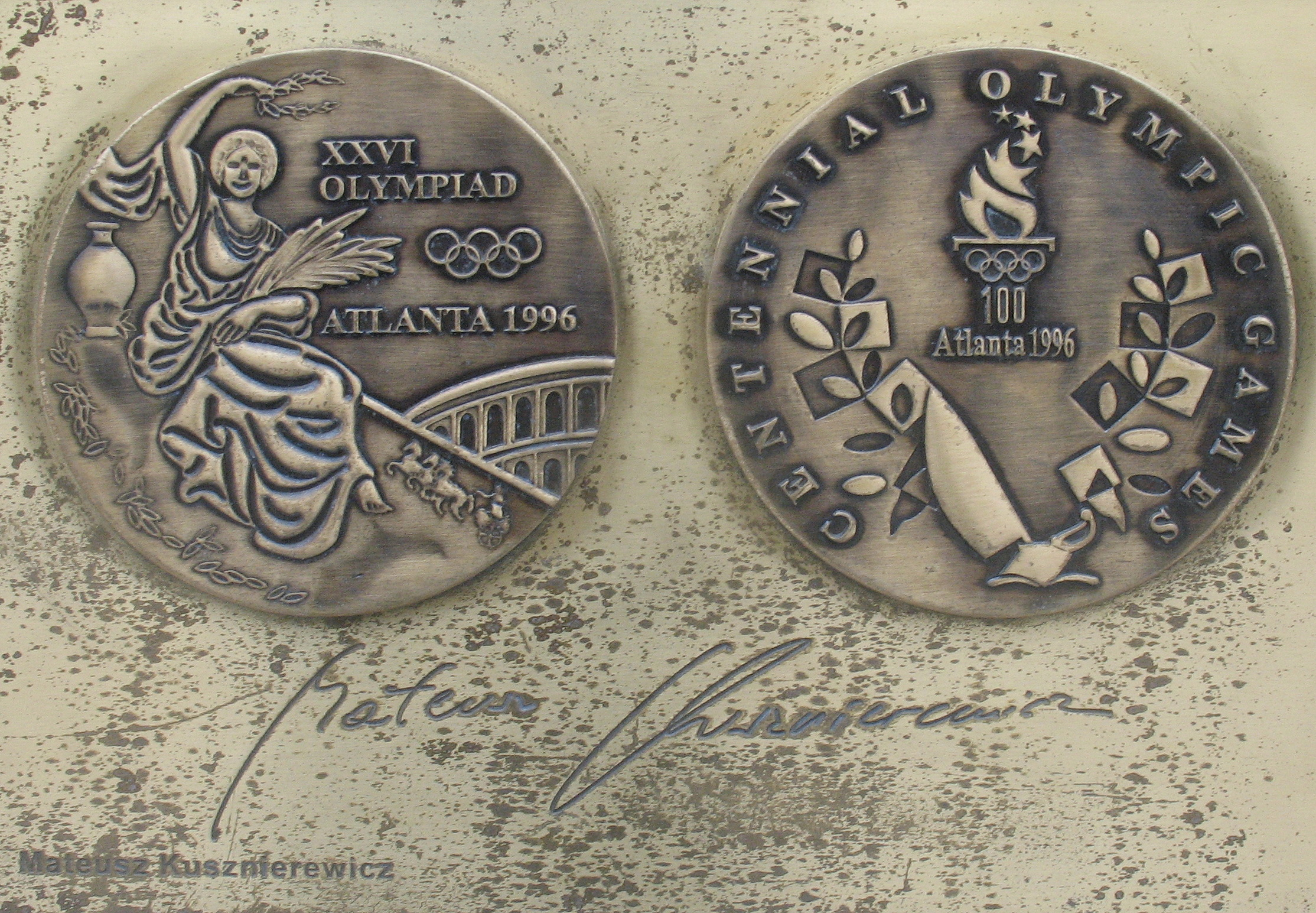
Copy of M. Kusznierewicz medal and autograph in Alei Gwiazd Sportu w Dziwnowie

Mateusz Kusznierewicz OLY (born 29 April 1975 in Warsaw) is a Polish sailor, specialising in the Finn and Star classes.

His first sailing success came in 1985, where he won the Puchar Spójni at the Zalew Zegrzyński in Warsaw. Most recently, he competed at the 2004 Summer Olympics in Athens, winning a bronze medal in the Finn.

== Awards and Honours ==
Won the World Sailing main award in 1999 the World Sailor of the Year Awards.

For his sport achievements, he received the Order of Polonia Restituta:
Knight's Cross (5th Class) in 1996,
Officer's Cross (4th Class) in 2004.

== Career Results ==
=== Olympics ===
  - 1st place in the Finn dinghy at 1996 Olympic Games
  - 4th place at the Finn dinghy at 2000 Olympic Games
  - 3rd place at the Finn dinghy at 2004 Olympic Games

=== World Championships ===
- ISAF Youth Sailing World Championships
  - 1992 2nd (Male ILCA 7 Fleet)
- OK Dinghy World Championship
  - 1992 4th
  - 1993 2nd
  - 1994 2nd
  - 1996 67th
- Finn World Championship
  - 1994 13th
  - 1995 46th
  - 1996 15th
  - 1997 8th
  - 1998 1st
  - 1999 2nd
  - 2000 1st
  - 2001 2nd
  - 2002 2nd
  - 2003 6th (incorporated into the Sailing World Championships)
  - 2004 4th place
- Star World Championship
  - 2006 8th
  - 2007 6th (incorporated into the Sailing World Championships)
  - 2008 1st place
  - 2009 7th
  - 2010 10th
  - 2011 4th (incorporated into the Sailing World Championships)
  - 2019 1st place
- 5.5 Metre World Championship
  - 2023 1st place Helm
  - 2024 3rd place Crew
  - 2025 2nd place Crew
  - 2026 1st place Crew
- Etchells World Championship
  - 2025 6th

== Other Titles ==
Kusznierewicz has also won over 20 international regattas, and won World Sailing main award in 1999 the World Sailor of the Year Awards.

- 1994:
  - European Champion OK dinghy
  - 2nd place at OK Dinghy World Championship
- 1996:
  - 2nd place European Championships Finn dinghy
- 1998:
  - 1st place World Championships Finn dinghy
  - Winner of the Kieler Week Finn dinghy
- 1999:
  - Winner of the Kieler Week Finn dinghy
- 2000:
  - European Champion Finn dinghy
- 2001:
- 2002:
  - Winner of the Kieler Week Finn dinghy
- 2003:
  - 2nd place European Championships Finn dinghy
- 2004
  - European Champion Finn dinghy
