= Aleksander Tšutšelov =

Estonian sailor

Personal information
- Born: 26 April 1933 Tallinn, Estonia
- Died: 1 January 2017 (aged 83) Tallinn, Estonia
Medal record
Sailing
Representing the Soviet Union
Olympic Games
Silver medal – second place	1960 Rome	Finn class

Aleksander Tšutšelov (26 April 1933 – 1 January 2017) was an Estonian sailor who started with sailing at 1946. He won a silver medal for the Soviet Union in the Finn class at the 1960 Summer Olympics.

Tšutšelov died on 1 January 2017, aged 83.
