= Juan Firpo =

Argentine sailor

Personal information
- Nationality: Argentine
- Born: 4 January 1938 (age 87)

Sport
- Sport: Sailing

Juan Firpo (born 4 January 1938) is an Argentine sailor. He competed in the Finn event at the 1976 Summer Olympics.
