= Louis Schiess =

Swiss sailor

Personal information
- Nationality: Swiss
- Born: 5 September 1925 Herisau, Switzerland
- Died: 22 October 1984 (aged 59)

Sport
- Sport: Sailing

Louis Schiess (5 September 1925 – 22 October 1984) was a Swiss sailor. He competed in the Finn event at the 1960 Summer Olympics.
