= Rafał Szukiel =

Polish sailor

Personal information
- Nickname: Blondi
- Nationality: Poland
- Born: 5 November 1976 (age 49) Mrągowo, Warmian-Masurian Voivodeship, Poland
- Height: 1.90 m (6 ft 3 in)
- Weight: 90 kg (198 lb)

Sailing career
- Sport: Sailing
- Club: AZS UWM Olsztyn
- Coached by: Tomasz Rumszewicz
- Class: Dinghy

Rafał Szukiel (born 5 November 1976) is a Polish former sailor, who specialized in the Finn class. He represented his country Poland at the 2008 Summer Olympics and came closest to the medal haul in the final race of his signature fleet, rounding out the top-ten spot. A senior member of the sailing roster at the University of Warmia and Mazury's sport academy in Olsztyn (Polish: AZS Uniwersytetu Warmińsko-Mazurskiego w Olsztynie), Szukiel trained most of his competitive sporting career under the tutelage of his personal coach Tomasz Rumszewicz.

Szukiel competed for the Polish sailing squad in the Finn class at the 2008 Summer Olympics in Beijing. A few months earlier, he was selected over the quota recipient and his older brother Wacław to lock the country's top Finn berth for the Games, based on his aggregate scores in a lineup of international regattas sanctioned by the Polish Yachting Association. Szukiel opened a set of two races with a blistering runner-up finish to head the leaderboard. Amid a streak of lowly marks and a suspension of the last two legs because of inclement weather, he found the best pressure to steer his way to fifth in the final race. Szukiel's cumulative marks attained in the series, however, dropped him steadily to tenth overall with 82 net points.
