= Philippe Willems =

Belgian sailor

Personal information
- Nationality: Belgian
- Born: 30 May 1950 (age 74); Brecht, Belgium

Sport
- Sport: Sailing

Philippe Willems (born 30 May 1950) is a Belgian former sailor. He competed in the Finn event at the 1984 Summer Olympics.
