= Chris Pratt (sailor) =

Australian sailor

Personal information
- Nationality: Australian
- Born: 1 August 1959 (age 65)
- Home town: Adelaide, South Australia

Sport
- Sport: Sailing

Chris Pratt (born 1 August 1959) is an Australian sailor. He competed at the 1984 Summer Olympics and the 1988 Summer Olympics.

In 1984, Pratt's Olympic selection was controversial, as many believed Larry Kleist should have been selected for the Australian sailing team instead. However unlike Kleist, Pratt had demonstrated versatility in various different wind conditions. In addition, although Kleist had done better in large European competition, it was argued that the smaller size of the Olympic sailing final would benefit Pratt because he would not have to maneuver around as many boats. Pratt finished 6th in the Olympic Finn final.

In 1985, Pratt won his third straight national Finn victory on Port Phillip Bay.

Pratt is from Adelaide, South Australia. He worked a full-time job in addition to his sailing career.
