= Daniel Mackenzie =

Kenyan sailor

Personal information
- Nationality: Kenyan
- Born: 26 January 1935 (age 90); Scotland

Sport
- Sport: Sailing

Daniel Mackenzie (born 26 January 1935) is a Kenyan former sailor. He competed in the Finn event at the 1960 Summer Olympics.
