= Howard Lee (sailor) =

Bermudian sailor

Personal information
- Nationality: Bermudian
- Born: 15 August 1935
- Died: 23 August 2012 (aged 77)

Sport
- Sport: Sailing

Howard Lee (15 August 1935 – 23 August 2012) was a Bermudian sailor. He competed in the Finn event at the 1976 Summer Olympics.
