= Tu Guangming =

Chinese sailor

Personal information
- Nationality: Chinese
- Born: 1 February 1960 (age 65)

Sport
- Sport: Sailing

Tu Guangming (born 1 February 1960) is a Chinese sailor. He competed in the Finn event at the 1984 Summer Olympics.
