= Gordon Burn-Wood =

South African sailor (1914–1981)

Personal information
- Nationality: South African
- Born: 2 July 1914; Vryheid, South Africa
- Died: 8 October 1981 (aged 67); Cape Town, South Africa

Sport
- Sport: Sailing

Gordon Burn-Wood (2 July 1914 – 8 October 1981) was a South African sailor. He competed in the Finn event at the 1960 Summer Olympics.
