= Hans Kämmerer =

German sailor

Personal information
- Nationality: German
- Born: 4 February 1937 (age 88); Düsseldorf, Germany

Sport
- Sport: Sailing

Hans Kämmerer (born 4 February 1937) is a German sailor. He competed in the Finn event at the 1960 Summer Olympics.
