= Zhang Peng (sailor) =

Chinese sports sailor

Zhang Peng (born 1981-06-04 in Qingdao, Shandong) is a male Chinese sports sailor who competed for Team China at the 2008 Summer Olympics.

Peng placed 24th in the Finn Heavyweight Dinghy Mixed event.

== Major performances ==
- 2001 National Games – 2nd Finn class;
- 2002/2005/2006/2007 National Championships – 1st Finn class;
- 2005/2007/2008 National Champions Tournament – 1st Finn class
