= Tom Skjønberg =

Norwegian sailor (1948–2019)

Personal information
- Nationality: Norwegian
- Born: 8 October 1948; Oslo
- Died: 12 March 2019 (aged 70)

Sport
- Country: Norway
- Sport: Sailing

Tom Skjønberg (8 October 1948 – 12 March 2019) is a Norwegian sailor. He was born in Oslo, but represented the club Bærum SF. He competed at the 1976 Summer Olympics in Montreal, where he placed 24th in the Finn class. He died at the age of 70.
