= Hans-Peter Fürst =

Austrian sailor

Personal information
- Nationality: Austrian
- Born: 5 April 1932; Vienna, Austria

Sport
- Sport: Sailing

Hans-Peter Fürst (born 5 April 1932) is an Austrian sailor. He competed in the Finn event at the 1960 Summer Olympics.
