= Per Jordbakke =

Norwegian sailor

Personal information
- Full name: Per Hans Ernst Jordbakke
- Nationality: Norwegian
- Born: 14 March 1932; Bærum, Norway
- Died: 20 November 1965 (aged 33); Bærum, Norway
- Height: 180 cm (5 ft 11 in)

Sport
- Country: Norway
- Sport: Sailing

Per Hans Ernst Jordbakke (14 March 1932 – 20 November 1965) was a Norwegian sailor. He was born in Bærum. He competed at the 1960 Summer Olympics in Rome, where placed 13th in the Finn class. He also competed at the 1964 Summer Olympics, where he placed 15th in the Finn class.
