= Nasser Karam =

Egyptian sailor

Personal information
- Nationality: Egyptian
- Born: 1 June 1957 (age 68)

Sport
- Sport: Sailing

Nasser Karam (born 1 June 1957) is an Egyptian sailor. He competed in the Finn event at the 1984 Summer Olympics.
