= Werner Sülberg =

German competitive sailor

Personal information
- Nationality: German
- Born: 8 August 1950 (age 74); North Rhine-Westphalia, Germany

Sport
- Sport: Sailing

Werner Sülberg (born 8 August 1950) is a German sailor. He competed in the Finn event at the 1976 Summer Olympics.
