= Ryszard Blaszka =

Polish sailor

Personal information
- Nationality: Polish
- Born: 2 March 1951 (age 74); Poznań, Poland

Sport
- Sport: Sailing

Ryszard Blaszka (born 2 March 1951) is a Polish sailor. He competed in the Finn event at the 1976 Summer Olympics.
