= André Budzien =

German sailor

Personal information
- Nationality: German
- Born: 28 August 1962 (age 63)

Sailing career
- Sport: Sailing
- Class(es): OK Dinghy, Finn, Star

André Budzien (born 28 August 1962) is a German sailor who has won multiple world championships with victories at the Master World Championship for the Finn class and the three time OK Dinghy open World Champion.
