= Serge Maury =

French sailor

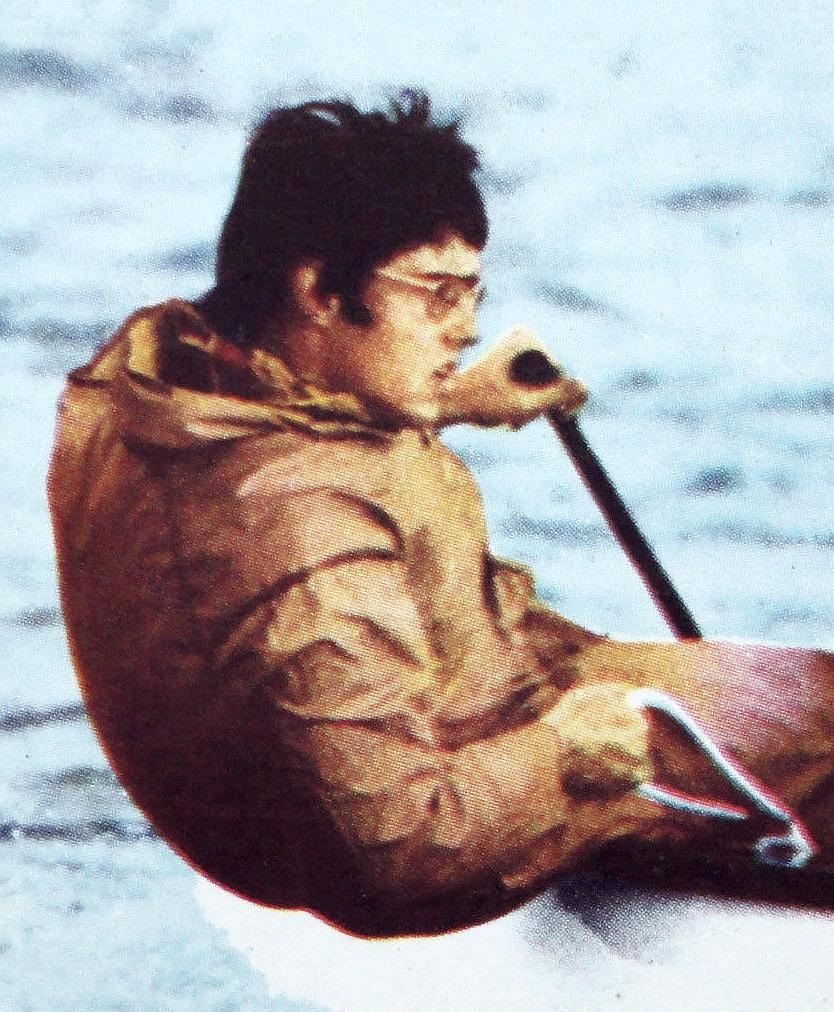

Personal information
- Born: 24 July 1946 (age 79) Bordeaux, France
- Height: 182 cm (6 ft 0 in)
- Weight: 78 kg (172 lb)

Sailing career
- Sport: Sailing
- Club: Cercle de la Voile de Bordeaux
- Class: Finn
Medal record
Sailing
Representing France
Olympic Games
Gold medal – first place	1972 Munich	Finn class
Finn Gold Cup
Bronze medal – third place	1971 Toronto	Singles
Gold medal – first place	1973 Brest	Singles

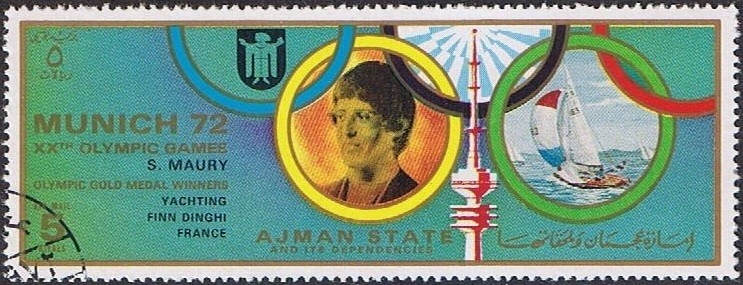
Maury on a stamp of Ajman

Serge Jean Maury (born 24 July 1946) is a French sailor. He competed in the finn class at the 1972 and 1976 Olympics and won a gold medal in 1972. He won the Finn Gold Cup in 1973 and placed third in 1971.
