= Jörg Bruder =

Brazilian sailor

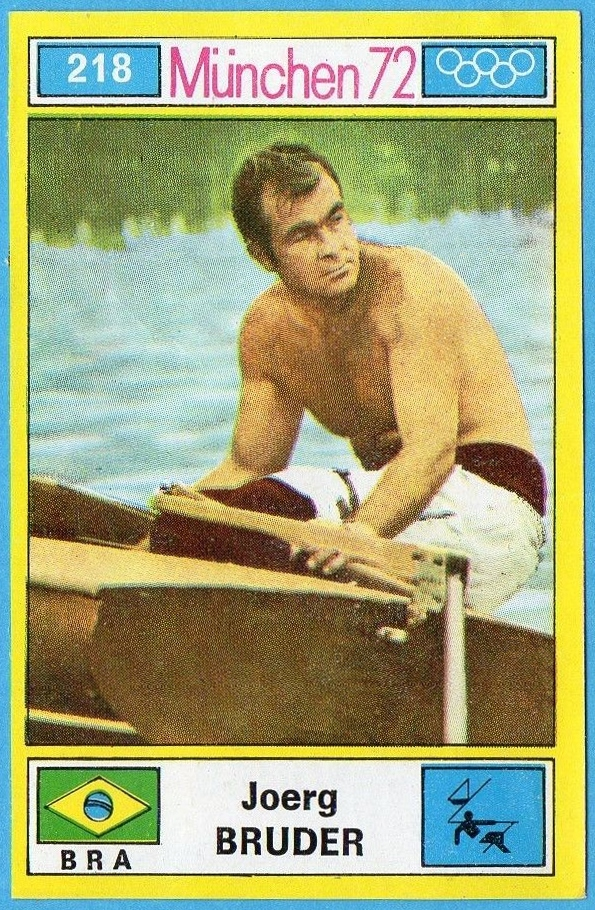

Personal information
- Born: November 16, 1937 São Paulo, Brazil
- Died: July 11, 1973 (aged 35) Orly, France
- Height: 180 cm (5 ft 11 in)
- Weight: 85 kg (187 lb)

Sport
- Sport: Sailing
- Club: Yacht Club Paulista
Medal record
Representing Brazil
Pan American Games
Gold medal – first place	1967 Winnipeg	Finn
Gold medal – first place	1971 Cali	Finn
Finn Gold Cup
Silver medal – second place	1966 La Baule	Singles
Bronze medal – third place	1968 Whitestable	Singles
Silver medal – second place	1969 Hamilton	Singles
Gold medal – first place	1970 Cascais	Singles
Gold medal – first place	1971 Toronto	Singles
Gold medal – first place	1972 Anzio	Singles
Star World Championships
Silver medal – second place	1972 Caracas	Doubles
Star European Championships
Silver medal – second place	1970 Sandhamn	Doubles

Jörg Bruder (16 November 1937 – 11 July 1973) was a Brazilian sailor and geology professor at the University of São Paulo. Born in São Paulo, he became the first three-time Finn Gold Cup champion. Bruder died in 1973 in Orly, Paris, on Varig Flight 820 to Paris, when travelling to the Finn Gold Cup.

During the 2003 Finn Gold Cup in Rio de Janeiro, the Brazilian Olympic Committee presented the International Finn Association with a trophy honoring Bruder. The IFA has since used the Jörg Bruder Silver Cup to award Junior World Champions of the class.

== Biography ==
Known for a successful sailing career, he participated in the 1964, 1968 and 1972 Olympics and was a two-time winner at the Pan American Games. Bruder developed wooden masts with lighter weight and special curves, later developing aluminium masts, which were used by many Finn sailors around the world.

Bruder placed seventh in the 1964 Olympics Finn competition, which was followed by a ninth place in 1968 Olympics. He then changed to the Star class teaming with Jan Aten to sail "Buho Blanco" (BL 5217), a wooden boat purchased in Mexico. They won the 7th District & Brazilian Star Championship qualifiers in Rio de Janeiro for the Olympics. In July, they were 1972 Kiel Week champions, sailing against a 60 other boats.

At the Olympic competition in Kiel, the weak winds dominated the early days. Then the Munich massacre interrupted the sequence of races. Entering the final regatta with medal chances, Bruder and Aten finished in fourth place overall.

In the 1972 Olympics, sailed in Kiel, the great Brazilian Finn sailor Joerg Bruder competed in the Star Class. On the way out of the harbor, Bruder and his crew Jan Willem Aten snagged a shroud on a piling and brought the rig down on their heads. They brought the boat back to the dock, brought down a spare mast, stepped it, rigged it and sailed out to win that day's race.

— Dick Enersen, Restepping a Mast During a Regatta

=== Bruder masts ===
By 1968, Brazilian Jorg Bruder and Hubert Raudaschl had designed a mast and dacron sail combination where the mast was much stiffer at the top with an even bend. Bruder had found that one mast at his home club was faster than any other and he measured it carefully to find out why. The base of his new mast met the rule that the mast had to be 100 mm at the deck but the mast became an ellipse sideways just above deck. Masts commonly bent 22 cm in the middle. Bruder's new mast bent only 15 cm. The key change was the small fore and aft elliptical shape of the top meter of the mast. The small tip bent sideways easily and coupled to the upper leach to allow it to twist off automatically. In the next few years, Bruder did not glue the front of the mast in order to make it even softer down low. He eliminated the boom hole on his wooden masts and made a metal gooseneck. He also used Parana Pine, which he claimed was superior.

— Gus Miller and Andy Zawieja, History and Evolution of the Finn Mast

He also was 1972 Brazilian National champion in the Snipe class.
