= Jørgen Lindhardtsen =

Danish sailor (born 1945)

Personal information
- Nationality: Danish
- Born: 25 April 1945 (age 81) Nakskov, Denmark

Sport
- Sport: Sailing

Jørgen Lindhardtsen (born 25 April 1945) is a Danish sailor. He competed in the Finn event at the 1976 Summer Olympics. He has been active in sports sailing in Denmark for more than 6 decades, from his first experiences as a child in Nakskov Fjord until his 80-year birthday, when he was still active and was celebrated with a competition in his name, "Lindhardtsen Classic 8.0" in Hellerup in April 2025.
