= Luc Choley =

French sailor

Personal information
- Nationality: French
- Born: 2 June 1959 (age 66) Malakoff, France

Sport
- Sport: Sailing

Luc Choley (born 2 June 1959) is a French sailor. He competed at the 1984 Summer Olympics and the 1988 Summer Olympics.
