= Brian Ledbetter =

American sailor

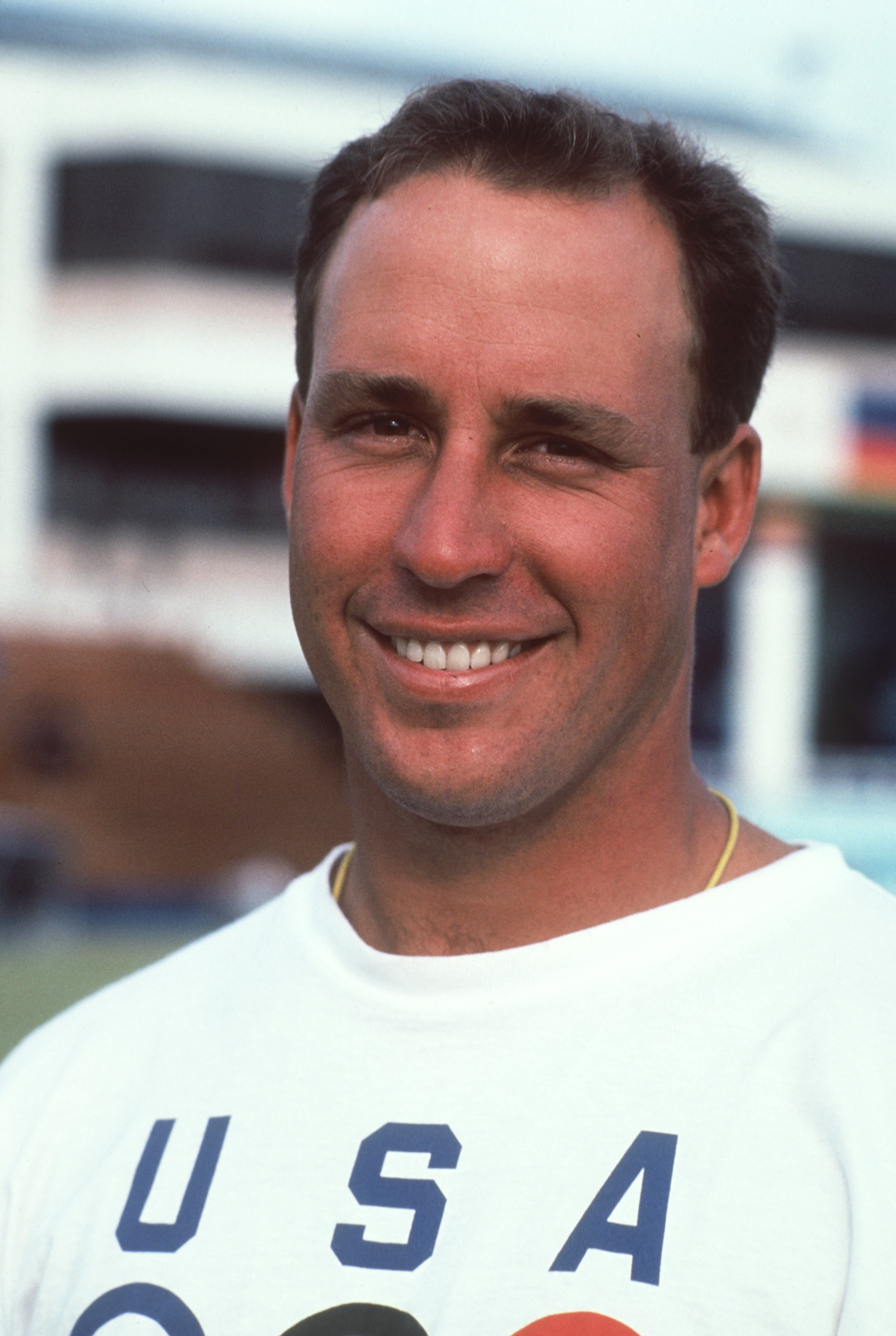
- Ledbetter in 1988

Personal information
- Full name: Brian Richard Ledbetter
- Born: November 18, 1963 (age 62) San Diego, California, U.S.
Medal record
Men's sailing
Representing the United States
Olympic Games
Silver medal – second place	1992 Barcelona	Finn class

Brian Richard Ledbetter (born November 18, 1963, in San Diego, California) is an American competitive sailor who won a silver medal in the Finn class at the 1992 Olympic Games in Barcelona.

== Career ==
At the 1988 Summer Olympics, Ledbetter placed 10th in the finn class.

At the 1992 Summer Olympics, Ledbetter finished in 2nd place in the finn class.

At the 2013 Star Class World Championship in San Diego, CA, Ledbetter earned two Gold Chevrons by winning Race 2, on September 2, 2013.

At the 2015 Star Class Western Hemisphere Championship in Miami, FL, Ledbetter finished in 1st place, on April 19, 2015.
