= Jonty Farmer =

New Zealand sailor (1945–2023)

Jonathan George "Jonty" Farmer (23 April 1945 – 4 September 2023) was a New Zealand sailor who represented his country at the 1968 and 1976 Summer Olympics.

== Biography ==
Farmer was born in 1945 in Te Puke in the Bay of Plenty. He later lived in Rotorua and received his education at Rotorua Boys' High School. He competed at the 1968 Summer Olympics in Mexico City in the Finn class and came 11th. He travelled to the 1972 Summer Olympics in Germany as a reserve but did not compete. He then competed at the 1976 Summer Olympics in Montreal, Canada, in the Finn class and came 15th.

His daughter, Holly Farmer, is a boat builder in Tauranga.

Farmer died on 4 September 2023, at the age of 78.
