= Walter Mai =

German sailor

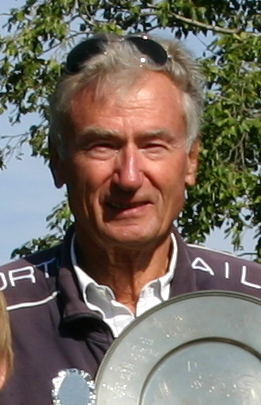
- Walter Mai in 2012

Personal information
- Nationality: German
- Born: 13 May 1936 (age 88); Prague, Czechoslovakia

Sport
- Sport: Sailing

Walter Mai (born 13 May 1936) is a German sailor. He competed in the Finn event at the 1972 Summer Olympics.
