= André Nelis =

Belgian sailor

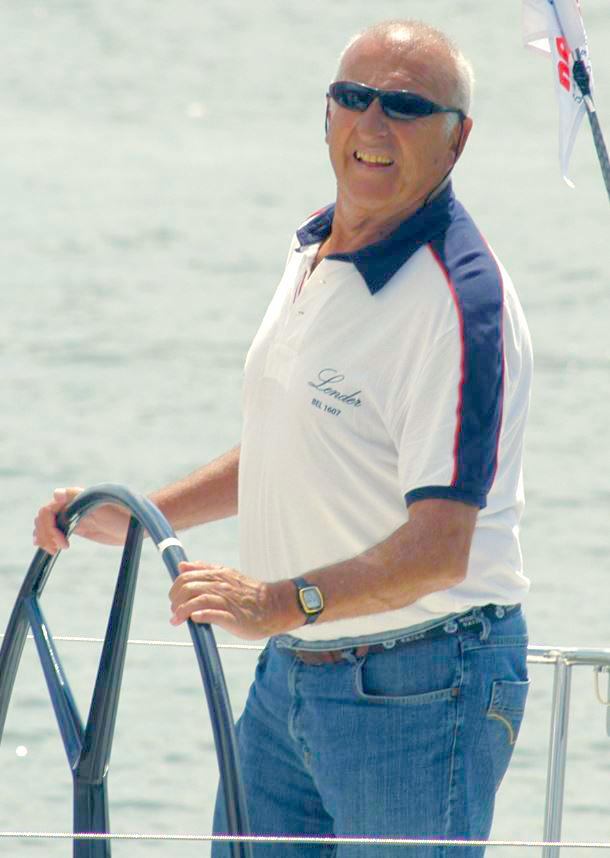
André Nelis

André Nelis (29 October 1935 – 9 December 2012) was a sailor and Olympian. He was born in Borgerhout, Belgium. He sailed in the Finn dinghy class, and won a silver medal at the 1956 Summer Olympics in Melbourne and bronze at the 1960 Summer Olympics in Rome. Competing in the Finn Gold Cup, Nelis won in 1956 and 1961; finished second in 1958, 1959, and 1960; and came third in 1957 and 1962.
