= Ingvar Bengtsson (sailor) =

Swedish sailor

Personal information
- Nationality: Swedish
- Born: 2 January 1955 (age 70); Gothenburg, Sweden

Sport
- Sport: Sailing

Ingvar Bengtsson (born 2 January 1955) is a Swedish sailor. He competed in the Finn event at the 1984 Summer Olympics.
