= Hank Lammens =

Canadian ice hockey player

- Born: February 21, 1966 (age 60) Brockville, Ontario, Canada
- Height: 6 ft 2 in (188 cm)
- Weight: 207 lb (94 kg; 14 st 11 lb)
- Position: Defence
- Shot: Left
- Played for: Ottawa Senators
- National team: Canada
- NHL draft: 160th overall, 1985; New York Islanders
- Playing career: 1988–1994

Hank Jacob Lammens (born February 21, 1966) is a Canadian former professional ice hockey player. He was drafted 160th overall by the New York Islanders in the 1985 NHL entry draft and played 27 regular season games for the Ottawa Senators during the 1993–94 NHL season. In addition to his hockey career, Lammens was an internationally accomplished sailor, competing for Canada in the 1992 Summer Olympics. He is a two-time world champion in the Finn class. He was also the captain of the Canadian National Team.

== Playing career ==
In 27 games with the NHL's Ottawa Senators, Lammens managed one goal and two assists and collected 22 penalty minutes. Before his professional career, Lammens played for St. Lawrence University, where he served as co-captain during his senior year.

== Career statistics ==
=== Regular season and playoffs ===
			Regular season					Playoffs
Season	Team	League	GP	G	A	Pts	PIM	GP	G	A	Pts	PIM
1984–85	St. Lawrence University	ECAC	31	3	8	11	24	—	—	—	—	—
1985–86	St. Lawrence University	ECAC	30	3	14	17	60	—	—	—	—	—
1986–87	St. Lawrence University	ECAC	35	6	13	19	92	—	—	—	—	—
1987–88	St. Lawrence University	ECAC	36	3	7	10	70	—	—	—	—	—
1988–89	Springfield Indians	AHL	69	1	13	14	55	—	—	—	—	—
1989–90	Springfield Indians	AHL	43	0	6	6	27	7	0	0	0	14
1990–91	Capital District Islanders	AHL	32	0	5	5	14	—	—	—	—	—
1990–91	Kansas City Blades	IHL	17	0	1	1	27	—	—	—	—	—
1992–93	Canadian National Team	Intl	64	8	14	22	83	—	—	—	—	—
1993–94	Ottawa Senators	NHL	27	1	2	3	22	—	—	—	—	—
1993–94	Prince Edward Island Senators	AHL	50	2	9	11	32	—	—	—	—	—
NHL totals			27	1	2	3	22	—	—	—	—	—

== Post hockey ==
Lammens is currently an Executive Director in trading for the investment bank of UBS Securities in New York City.

== Awards and honors ==
Award	Year
All-ECAC Hockey Second Team	1986–87, 1987–88
AHCA East Second-Team All-American	1986–87
ECAC Hockey All-Tournament Team	1988
