= Björn Forslund (sailor) =

Björn (or Bjørn) Forslund (born 3 May 1972) is an entrepreneur and former Swedish professional sailor who has participated in six Dinghy World Championships, winning two gold medals and ranked first in many national and international level sailing championships. He won the first Gold in 1995 - 'OK Dingy World Championship' in Felixstowe, UK and second in 1997 – 'OK Dingy World Championship' in Sønderbord, Denmark.

== Biography ==
Björn Forslund was born in Västervik, Sweden on 3 May 1972. After being born in Västervik he lived in Karlskrona and Gothenburg, and later moved to Majorca in Spain. And since 1998 he lives in Oslo Norway.

In 1993 Bjorn participated in ‘OK Dinghy World Championship’ held in Puck, Polen and finished it at rank eight. In 1994 he has participated in ‘Europe Dinghy Championship’ in La Rochelle in France and finished at rank thirty-two. During year 1995 he has competed in two ‘Europe Dinghy World Championships’, the World Championship competitions held in Auckland in New Zealand and the European Championship held in Malmö in Sweden and in both he finished at rank sixteen.

In year 1995, he won his first gold medal by competing in ‘OK Dinghy World Championship’ held in Fleixstowe, UK. In 1996 he has participated in ‘Europe Dingy World Championship’ and finished at rank eight. Next year in 1997, he has participated in ‘OK Dinghy Swedish Championship’ in Båstad, Sweden and finished it at rank one. During this year he has won his second gold medal in ‘OK Dinghy World Championship’ held in Sønderborg, Denmark and continued participating in various national and international level sailing championships in consecutive years until 2013.

== Achievements ==
| Year | Competition | Venue | Position | Sailing Class |
|---|---|---|---|---|
| 1993 | World Championship | Puck, Polen | 8 | OK Dingy |
| 1994 | World Championship | La Rochelle, France | 32 | Europe Dinghy |
| 1995 | World Championship | Auckland, New Zealand | 16 | Europe Dingy |
| 1995 | European Championship | Malmo, Sweden | 16 | Europe Dingy |
| 1995 | World Championship | Felixstowe, UK | 1 | OK Dinghy |
| 1996 | World Championship | Mallorca, Spain | 8 | Europe Dingy |
| 1997 | Swedish Champion | Båstad, Sweden | 1 | OK Dinghy |
| 1997 | World Championship | Sønderbord, Denmark | 1 | OK Dinghy |
| 1998 | Norwegian Championship | Bergen, Norway | 2 | SNIPE |
| 2000 | Norwegian Championship | Arendal, Norway | 2 | Melges 24 |
| 2000 | European Championship | Åsgårdstrand, Norway | 3 | SNIPE |
| 2000 | Norwegian Championship | Vestfjorden, Norway | 2 | SNIPE |
| 2002 | Swedish Champion | Motala, Sweden | 1 | SNIPE |
| 2002 | Norwegian Championship | Stavanger, Norway | 1 | SNIPE |
| 2002 | European Championship | Anzio, Italy | 6 | SNIPE |
| 2003 | Colombian Championship | Bogota, Colombia | 1 | SNIPE |
| 2006 | Norwegian Championship | Oslo, Norway | 8 | Express |
| 2006 | Norwegian Championship | Oslo, Norway | 3 | Express |
| 2007 | Norwegian Championship | Ran, Norway | 1 | Express |
| 2008 | WATSKI SKAGERRAK TWOSTAR 2008 | Hankø, Norway | 1 | Elan 37 |
| 2008 | Hollænder Seilasen | Son, Norway | 1 | Elan 37 |
| 2009 | OneStar | Hankø, Norway | 1 | Elan 37 |
| 2009 | Oslofjorden Rundt | Asker, Norway | 1 | Elan 37 |
| 2010 | Seilmakeren Doublehanded | Askøy Norway | 2 | Elan 37 |
| 2012 | Seilmakeren Doublehanded | Askøy Norway | 2 | Elan 37 |
| 2012 | Bohusracet | Uddevalla, Sweden | 6 | Kracer 40 |
| 2012 | Watski Skagerrak TwoStar | Hankø, Norway | 1 | Kracer 40 |
| 2012 | Årets Shorthandedseiler | Various, Norway | 1 | Kracer 40 |
| 2013 | Bohusracet | Uddevalla, Sweden | 4 | Elan 37 |
| 2013 | Seilmakeren Doublehanded | Askøy, Norway | 1 | Elan 37 |
| 2020 | NM I Shorthanded | Nesodden, Norway | 1 | Express |

== Work ==
As of May 2020
He is today the CEO & Founder of House of Martech, MainBrainer, and Loyalty Communication. In his past, he has been CEO, CTO, chairman of the board, board member, and Founder/ co-founder in TargetEveryOne AB (publ), Ironroad AB (Publ), XIB Group, Yamanu Group, Lev enkelt, Forslund invest, Communicate Norge, Frontec Norge, and Frontec.
