= Lawrence Lemieux =

Canadian sailor (born 1955)

Personal information
- Born: 12 November 1955 (age 70) Edmonton, Alberta

Sport
- Sport: Sailing
Medal record
Representing Canada
Pan American Games
Gold medal – first place	1991 Havana	Finn

Lawrence Lemieux (born 12 November 1955, in Edmonton, Alberta) is a Canadian sailor, who competed at the 1984 Summer Olympics in the Star class and at the 1988 Summer Olympics in the Finn class. He was recognized for his noble actions in the latter competition.

== Biography ==
Lemieux grew up sailing on Wabamun Lake west of Edmonton with his five older brothers. He began racing solo boats in the 1970s.

=== 1988 Olympic rescue ===
On 24 September 1988, the sailing competition was underway at Busan Yachting Center, 325 kilometres (202 mi) from South Korea's capital of Seoul, the main Olympic site. At the time, the 470 and Finn classes were running races on their respective courses. The wind suddenly picked up, blowing 35 knots (18 m/s; 65 km/h; 40 mph), and the Singapore team's 470 dinghy with Joseph Chan and Siew Shaw Her aboard capsized. The men were thrown from the boat as it heeled over and were injured and in need of assistance. At this time, Lemieux was running the fifth of the seven total races to determine the medalists in the Finn class and was in second place in that race. Near the halfway point of his race, Lemieux spotted the turtled Singaporean boat and deviated from his course to assist in rescuing Chan and Siew. After pulling them from the water, Lemieux waited for a patrol boat to take the rescued sailors back to shore. Once that happened, he rejoined the Finn fleet, finishing in 22nd place in a field of 32 boats. However, due to his actions, the International Yacht Racing Union decided to reinstate Lemieux's position when he went off course, rewarding him with a second-place finish in his race. Despite this, Lemieux went on to place eleventh in the class.

At a special ceremony on 28 September 1988, in attendance of Juan Antonio Samaranch, president of the International Olympic Committee, Peter Tallberg, president of the International Yacht Racing Union, and Constantine II of Greece, himself an able yachtsman having won a gold medal in the Dragon class at the 1960 Summer Olympics in Rome, Lemieux's heroic act was acknowledged, with Samaranch saying, "By your sportsmanship, self-sacrifice and courage, you embody all that is right with the Olympic ideal." Many 21st century sources, including Edmonton Journal, BBC Sport, Inside the Games, CBC Sports, The Globe and Mail, Bustle, Smithsonian, India Today, Mental Floss, and Toronto Star, as well as the Canadian Olympic Committee, have peddled as a fact that Lemieux received the Pierre de Coubertin Medal, although the Medal was inaugurated nine years later in 1997. The International Olympic Committee has said he did not receive it. In CBC Sports video footage from 1988, Lemieux shows the "special price", a small blue trinket box with the Seoul Olympics logo on the hinged lid, and not quite sure what to call it says "it's a jar of some sort."

== Post-retirement ==
Lemieux has since retired from professional sailing and is now a coach. In 2008, he was inducted into the Alberta Sports Hall of Fame. Asked in a 2012 interview if he would rather be talking about the medal he might have won instead of the rescue, Lemieux referred to sailing's lack of a high media profile: "You spend your life working really hard internationally and you get very few accolades. So that's the ironic thing; 25 years after this rescue, we're still talking about it." As of 2020, Lemieux was living at Seba Beach, Alberta.
