= Rafael Trujillo (sailor) =

Spanish sailor

Medal record

Men's sailing

Representing Spain

Olympic Games
Silver medal – second place	2004 Athens	Finn

Finn Gold Cup
Gold medal – first place	2007 Cascais	Finn class
Silver medal – second place	2003 Cádiz	Finn class
Silver medal – second place	2010 San Francisco	Finn class

Rafael Joaquín Trujillo Villar (born 14 December 1975 in La Línea de la Concepción, Cádiz) is a Spanish sailor of the Finn class and an Olympic medalist. He won the Finn Gold Cup once and competed in four straight Olympic Games, winning a silver medal in Athens 2004.

He sailed with +39 Challenge in the 2007 Louis Vuitton Cup.

Trujillo was also part of the Mapfre yacht in the 2014–15 Volvo Ocean Race, and coaches 2013 world champion Jorge Zarif.
