= Lasse Hjortnæs =

Danish sailor

Personal information
- Nationality: Denmark
- Born: 15 October 1960 (age 65) Copenhagen, Denmark
- Height: 194 cm (6 ft 4 in)
- Weight: 108 kg (238 lb)

Sailing career
- Sport: Sailing
- Club: Royal Danish Yacht Club
- Class(es): Finn, Laser

Lasse Hjortnæs (born 15 October 1960 in Copenhagen) is a Danish Olympic sailor. He competed in the 1980, 1984, 1988 and 2000 Summer Olympics and finished fifth in the Finn class in the 1988 edition.
