= Guillaume Florent =

French sailor

Olympic medal record

Representing France

Sailing
Bronze medal – third place	2008 Beijing	Finn

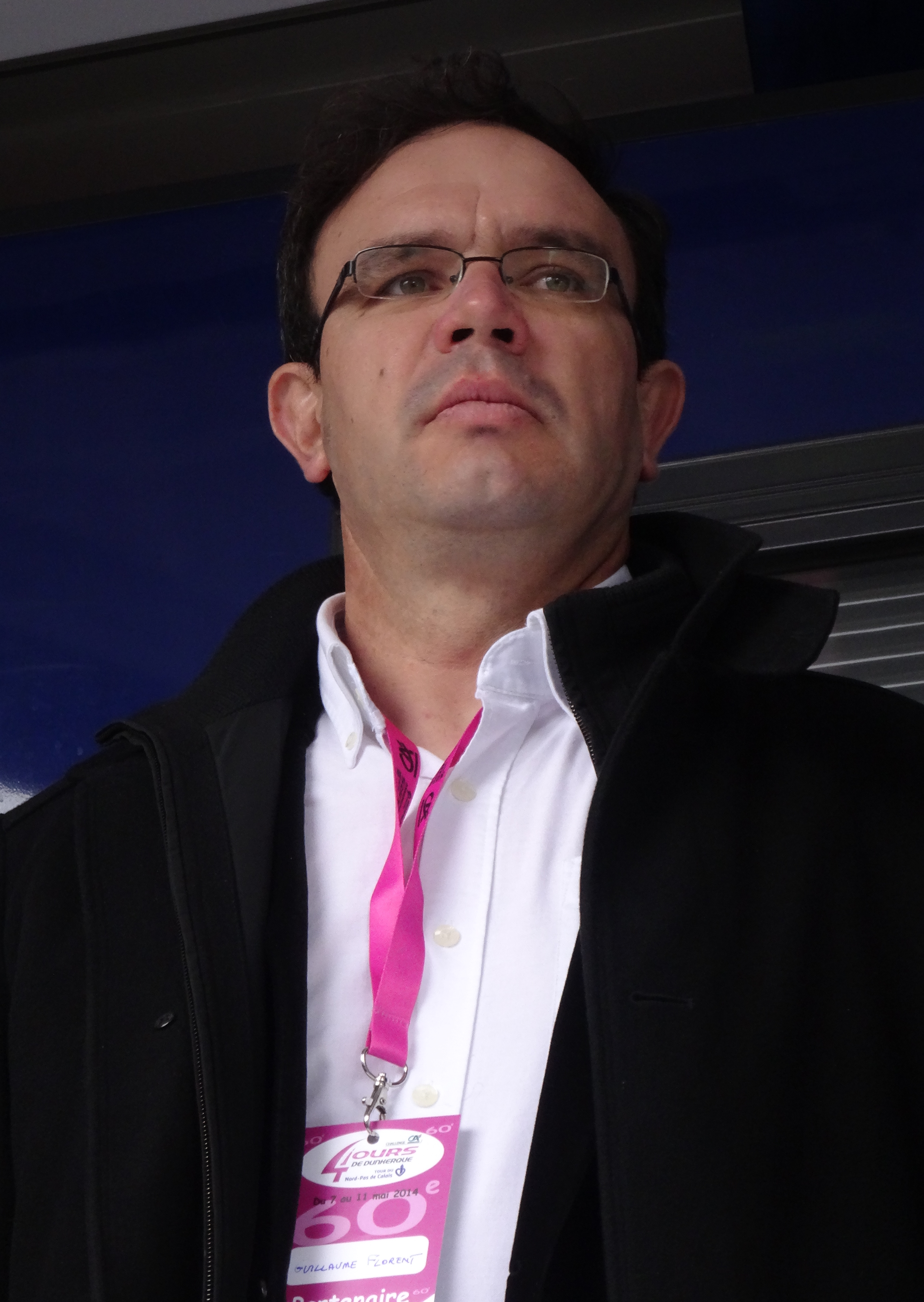
Guillaume Florent

Guillaume Florent (born 13 October 1973, in Dunkirk, France) is a French sailor and Olympic athlete who won a bronze medal at the 2008 Summer Olympics.
