= Jonas Høgh-Christensen =

Danish sailor

Personal information
- Nationality: Danish
- Born: 21 May 1981 (age 45) Copenhagen, Denmark
- Height: 186 cm (6 ft 1 in)
- Weight: 102 kg (225 lb)

Sailing career
- Sport: Sailing
- Club: Royal Danish Yacht Club
- Class(es): Finn, ILCA 7, Europe
Medal record
Men's sailing
Representing Denmark
Olympic Games
Silver medal – second place	London 2012	Finn class

Jonas Høgh-Christensen (born 21 May 1981) is a Danish sailor, winner of the Finn Gold Cup in 2009. He has represented Denmark in the Finn class at the 2004, 2008 and 2012 Summer Olympics at which he won the silver medal, narrowly missing out on the gold to British sailor Ben Ainslie.
