= Vladimir Krutskikh =

Russian sailor

Personal information
- Nationality: Russian
- Born: 24 April 1973 (age 53)

Sport
- Sport: Sailing

Vladimir Krutskikh (born 24 April 1973) is a Russian sailor. He competed at the 2000 Summer Olympics and the 2004 Summer Olympics.
