= Terence Neilson =

Canadian sailor

Personal information
- Born: November 2, 1958 (age 68) Toronto, Ontario, Canada

Sailing career
- Sport: Sailing
Medal record
Men's sailing
Representing Canada
Olympic Games
Bronze medal – third place	1984 Los Angeles	Finn class

Terence "Terry" Neilson (born November 2, 1958, in Toronto, Ontario) is a Canadian sailor. He won a bronze medal in the Finn Class at the 1984 Summer Olympics.

He skippered Canada II during the 1987 Louis Vuitton Cup.
