= John Bertrand (sailor, born 1956) =

American sailor

Personal information
- Full name: John Joseph Bertrand
- Born: March 25, 1956 (age 70) San Mateo, California, U.S.
Medal record
Men's sailing
Representing the United States
Olympic Games
Silver medal – second place	1984 Los Angeles	Finn class

John Joseph Bertrand (born March 25, 1956, in San Mateo, California) is an American former competitive sailor and Olympic silver medalist.

== Career ==
Bertrand sailed with John Kolius on board Courageous in the 1983 America's Cup defender's trials.

At the 1984 Summer Olympics, Bertrand finished in second place in the Finn class. He was then involved in the New York Yacht Club's challenge for the 1987 Louis Vuitton Cup, first as tactician and then replacing Kolius as skipper.

He again raced alongside Kolius on Abracadabra 2000 during the 2000 Louis Vuitton Cup.
