= Finn (dinghy) =

One Person Sailing Dinghy formerly used in the Olympic

Development
- Designer: Rickard Sarby
- Year: 1949

Boat
- Crew: 1
- Draft: 0.17 m (6.7 in)

Hull
- Hull weight: 107 kg (236 lb)
- LOA: 4.5 m (14 ft 9 in)
- LWL: 4.34 m (14 ft 3 in)
- Beam: 1.47 m (4 ft 10 in)

Rig
- Mast height: 6.66 m (21 ft 10 in)

Sails
- Mainsail area: 10.6 m^{2} (114 sq ft)

Rating
- D-PN: 90.1
- RYA PN: 1060

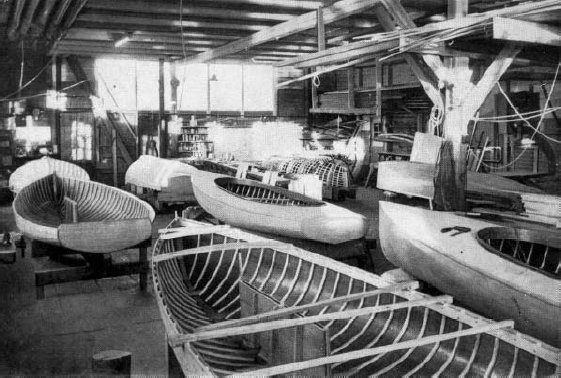
Building of Finn dinghies in 1952.

The Finn dinghy is a single-handed, cat-rigged sailboat, and a former Olympic class for men's sailing. Since its debut at the 1952 Summer Olympics in Helsinki, the Finn featured in every summer Olympics until 2020, making it the longest serving dinghy in the Olympic Regatta and one of the most prolific Olympic sailboats. The Finn is a physically demanding boat to race at the highest levels, especially since the class rules now allow unlimited boat rocking and sail pumping when the wind is above 10 knots. The event did not feature on the Olympic programme from 2024.

== Design ==
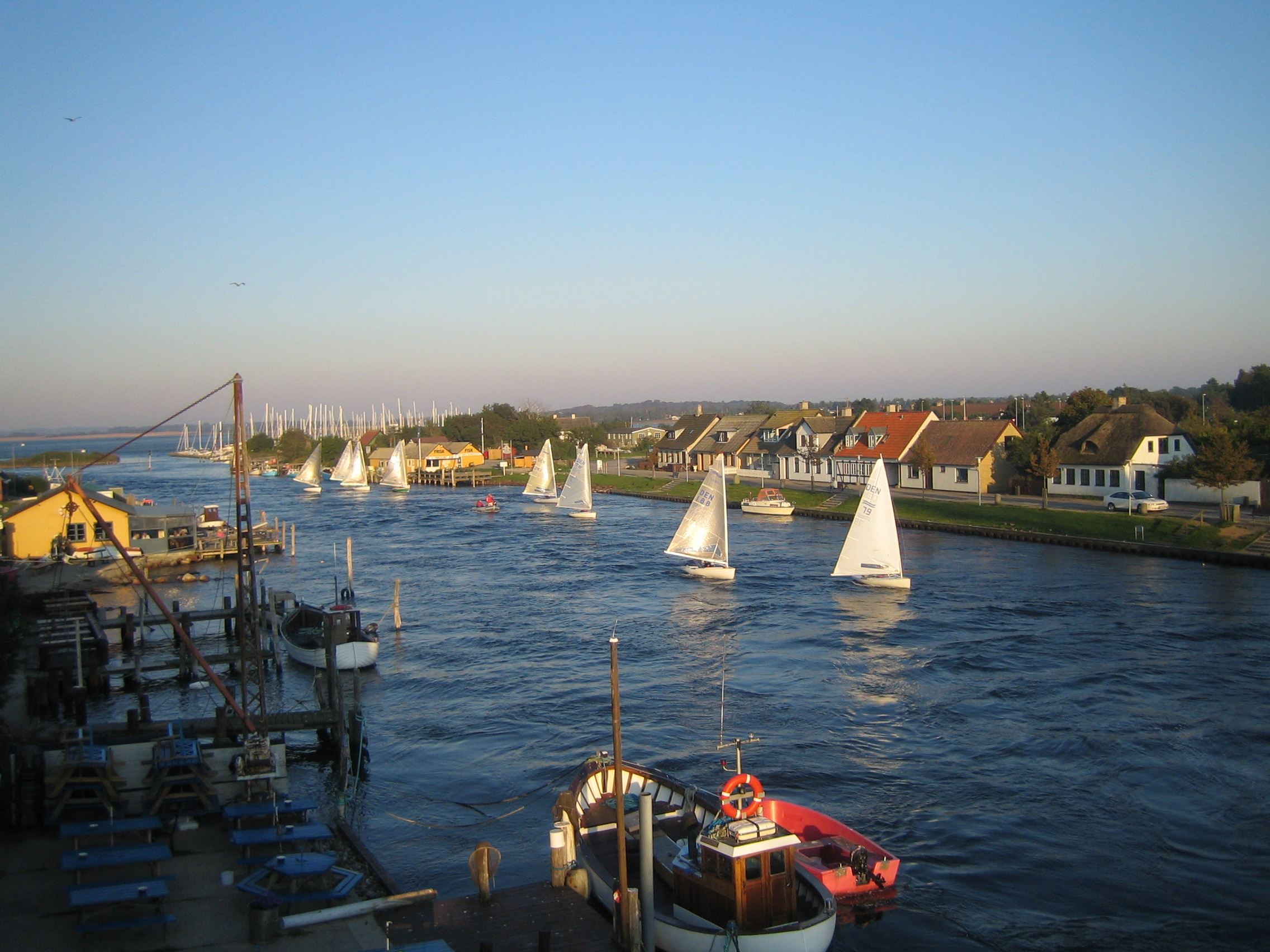
Finn dinghies

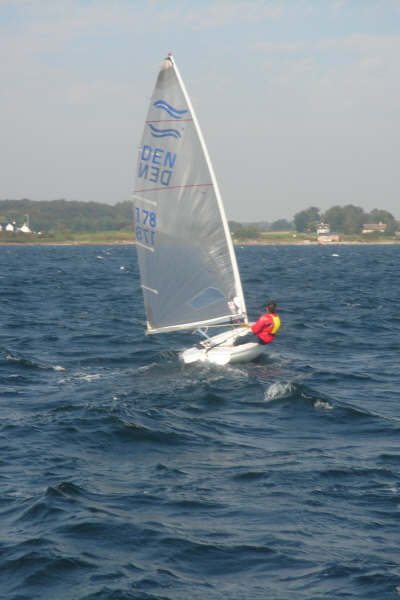
Finn dinghy

The Finn was designed by Swedish canoe designer, Rickard Sarby, in 1949 for the Helsinki Olympics.

In 1952 the hulls were built of timber and the sails were of cotton. Initially there was little understanding of the role of a mast which could bend to reduce power. However over time the Finn sailors learned how to plane timber off the front of their masts for heavy winds and to glue on strips of timber on the front of the masts for lighter winds.

Although the Finn hull has changed little since then, there have been developments to the rig. The original spars were made of wood until the late 1960s and early 1970s, when there was a gradual change to aluminum masts. Aluminum masts are significantly more flexible and allow more control over sail shape, and became common after the 1972 Summer Olympics in Munich when they were first supplied to Olympic sailors. More recently, carbon fiber masts have become common in competition Finns.

The sails, too, have evolved and are now commonly made of various laminates such as Technora, polyester, and Kevlar.

The class rules are overseen by the International Finn Association.

== Events ==
=== Olympic Games ===
Games	Gold	Silver	Bronze
1952 Helsinki: Open	Paul Elvstrøm; Denmark	Charles Currey; Great Britain	Rickard Sarby; Sweden
1956 Melbourne: Open	Paul Elvstrøm; Denmark	André Nelis; Belgium	John Marvin; United States
1960 Rome: Open	Paul Elvstrøm; Denmark	Aleksander Tšutšelov; Soviet Union	André Nelis; Belgium
1964 Tokyo: Open	Wilhelm Kuhweide; United Team of Germany	Peter Barrett; United States	Henning Wind; Denmark
1968 Mexico City: Open	Valentin Mankin; Soviet Union	Hubert Raudaschl; Austria	Fabio Albarelli; Italy
1972 Munich: Open	Serge Maury; France	Ilias Hatzipavlis; Greece	Viktor Potapov; Soviet Union
1976 Montreal: Open	Jochen Schümann; East Germany	Andrei Balashov; Soviet Union	John Bertrand; Australia
1980 Moscow: Open	Esko Rechardt; Finland	Wolfgang Mayrhofer; Austria	Andrei Balashov; Soviet Union
1984 Los Angeles: Open	Russell Coutts; New Zealand	John Bertrand; United States	Terry Neilson; Canada
1988 Seoul: Male	José Doreste; Spain	Peter Holmberg; Virgin Islands	John Cutler; New Zealand
1992 Barcelona: Male	José van der Ploeg; Spain	Brian Ledbetter; United States	Craig Monk; New Zealand
1996 Atlanta: Male	Mateusz Kusznierewicz; Poland	Sebastien Godefroid; Belgium	Roy Heiner; Netherlands
2000 Sydney: Male	Iain Percy; Great Britain	Luca Devoti; Italy	Fredrik Lööf; Sweden
2004 Athens: Male	Ben Ainslie; Great Britain	Rafael Trujillo; Spain	Mateusz Kusznierewicz; Poland
2008 Beijing: Open	Ben Ainslie; Great Britain	Zach Railey; United States	Guillaume Florent; France
2012 London: Male	Ben Ainslie; Great Britain	Jonas Høgh-Christensen; Denmark	Jonathan Lobert; France
2016 Rio de Janeiro: Male	Giles Scott; Great Britain	Vasilij Žbogar; Slovenia	Caleb Paine; United States
2020 Tokyo: Male	Giles Scott; Great Britain	Zsombor Berecz; Hungary	Joan Cardona Méndez; Spain

=== World Championships ===
- Finn Gold Cup Open Worlds
- Finn Youth World Championship for Under 23
- Finn Masters World Championship for sailors above 39

The following league combined table of medalist is below

Ranking	Sailor	Gold	Silver	Bronze	Total	No. Entries
1	Michal Maier (CZE)	6	1	1	8	37
2	Ben Ainslie (GBR)	6	0	0	6	7
3	Lawrence Lemieux (CAN)	5	3	2	10	24
4	Giles Scott (GBR)	5	0	1	6	10
5	Fredrik Lööf (SWE)	3	3	1	7	11
5	Jörg Bruder (BRA)	3	2	1	6	8
5	Lasse Hjortnäs (DEN)	3	2	0	5	13
7	Georg Oser (SUI)	3	1	2	6	12
8	Vladimir Krutskikh (RUS)	3	1	0	4	9
9	Andre Mevel (FRA)	3	0	2	5	6
10	Roland Balthasar (GER)	3	0	0	3	14
10	Wilhelm Kuhweide (EUA)	3	0	0	3	7
11	André Nelis (BEL)	2	3	2	7	8
12	Mateusz Kusznierewicz (POL)	2	3	0	5	10
13	Pieter-Jan Postma (NED)	2	2	3	7	15
13	Edward Wright (GBR)	2	2	3	7	16
15	Wolfgang Gerz (FRG)	2	2	2	6	13
16	Jonas Høgh-Christensen (DEN)	2	1	2	5	14
17	José Luis Doreste (ESP)	2	1	1	4	4
18	Paul Elvström (DEN)	2	1	0	3	4
18	Hank Lammens (CAN)	2	1	0	3	7
19	Philippe Presti (FRA)	2	0	1	3	6
20	Cam Lewis (USA)	2	0	0	2	3
20	Stig Westergaard (DEN)	2	0	0	2	7

=== Continental Championships ===
- 2006 Finn Open European Championship
