= Finn European Championship =

Finn class dinghy sailing regatta

The Finn European Championship is an annual European Championship sailing regatta in the Finn (dinghy) classes organised by the International Finn Association.

== Editions ==
Year	City	Country	Dates	Athletes	Nations	Note
1956	Loosdrecht	Netherlands				
1957	Naples	Italy				
1958	Lisbon	Portugal				
1959	St. Moritz	Switzerland				
1960	Ostend	Belgium				
1961	Warnemünde	East Germany				
1962	Kiel	West Germany				
1963	Balaton	Hungary				
1964	Copenhagen	Denmark				
1965	Cascais	Portugal				
1966	Attersee	Austria				
1967	Naples	Italy				
1968	Medemblik	Netherlands				
1969	Warnemünde	East Germany				
1970	Dublin	Ireland				
1971	Athens	Greece				
1972	Medemblik	Netherlands				
1973	Władysławowo	Poland				
1974	Niendorf	West Germany				
1975	llafranc	Spain				
1976	Port-Camargue	France				
1977	Istanbul	Turkey				
1978	Marstrand	Sweden				
1979	Malcesine	Italy				
1980	Helsinki	Finland				
1981	Faleron	Greece				
1982	Barcelona	Spain				
1983	Neusiedl am See	Austria				
1984	Władysławowo	Poland				
1985	Athens	Greece				
1986	Hyères	France				
1987	Skovshoved	Denmark				
1988	Medemblik	Netherlands				
1989	Helsinki	Finland				
1990	Hayling Island	United Kingdom	9–19 June			
1991	Anzio	Italy	9–18 June			
1992	Gdańsk	Poland	6–14 June			
1993	L'Estartit	Spain	3–13 June			
1994	Çeşme	Turkey	5–12 July			
1995	Balatonfüred	Hungary	9–16 September			
1996	L'Hospitalet de Llobregat	Spain	7–15 June			
1997	Split	Croatia	6–15 June			
1998	Vilamoura	Portugal	8–13 June			
1999	Ostend	Belgium	5–11 June			
2000	Palma	Spain	7–15 April			
2001	Malcesine	Italy	29 June – 7 July			
2002	Çeşme	Turkey	5–13 July			
2003	Gothenburg	Sweden	6–11 June			
2004	La Rochelle	France	7–15 May			
2005	Kalmar	Sweden	6–14 August			
2006	Palamós	Spain	22–30 September			
2007	Balatonföldvár	Hungary	1–9 June			
2008	Scarlino	Italy	2–10 May			
2009	Varna	Bulgaria	21–29 August			
2010	Split	Croatia	8–16 May			
2011	Helsinki	Finland				
2012	Scarlino	Italy	16–24 March			
2013	Warnemünde	Germany	19–27 July			
2014	La Rochelle	France	2–10 May			
2015	Split	Croatia	8–17 May			
2016	Barcelona	Spain	4–14 March			
2017	Marseille	France	5–13 May			
2018	Cádiz	Spain	12–17 March			
2019	Athens	Greece	13–18 May			
2020	Gdynia	Poland	2–6 September			
2021	Vilamoura	Portugal	10–16 April			
2022	Kiel	Germany	Cancelled due to low number of entries			
2023	Csopak	Hungary	14–18 May			
2024	Cannes	France	21–25 October	152	25	
2025	Napoli	Italy	8–12 April	126	21	
2026	Gdynia	Poland	23–27 June	98	18	

== Medalists ==
Year	Gold	Silver	Bronze
1956 Loosdrecht	Jürgen Vogler (GDR)	D. Poissant (FRA)	André Nelis (BEL)
1957 Naples	André Nelis (BEL)	Adelchi Pelaschier (ITA)	Jürgen Vogler (GDR)
1958 Lisbon	Adelchi Pelaschier (ITA)	Warburg (NED)	Reist (SUI)
1959 St. Moritz	Jacobus de Jongh (NED)	Pinaud (FRA)	Jürgen Vogler (GDR)
1960 Ostend	Paul Elvstrøm (DEN)	Willi Kuhweide (FRG)	André Nelis (BEL)
1961 Warnemünde	Willi Kuhweide (FRG)	Göran Andersson (SWE)	Walter Gärtner (GDR)
1962 Kiel	Boris Jacobsson (SWE)	Francis Jammes (FRA)	Jan de Long (NED)
1963 Balaton	Boris Jacobsson (SWE)	B. Straubinger (FRG)	B. Andersson (SWE)
1964 Copenhagen	Willi Kuhweide (FRG)	Henning Wind (DEN)	W. Marse (NED)
1965 Cascais	Bernd Dehmel (GDR)	Valentin Mankin (URS)	Willi Kuhweide (FRG)
1966 Attersee	Hubert Raudaschl (AUT)	Jörg Bruder (BRA)	U. Koler (SUI)
1967 Naples	Arwed von Grünewaldt (SWE)	Willi Kuhweide (FRG)	Jürgen Mier (GDR)
1968 Medemblik	Arne Åkerson (SWE)	Henning Wind (DEN)	Uwe Mares (FRG)
1969 Warnemünde	Arne Åkerson (SWE)	Börje Säll (SWE)	Guy Liljegren (SWE)
1970 Dublin	Thomas Lundqvist (SWE)	Guy Liljegren (SWE)	Jürgen Mier (GDR)
1971 Athens	Hans Binkhorst (NED)	Magnus Olin (SWE)	G. Finaczy (HUN)
1972 Medemblik	Christian Schröder (GDR)	Thomas Lundqvist (SWE)	Magnus Olin (SWE)
1973 Władysławowo	Christian Schröder (GDR)	Leonard Gustafsson (SWE)	Jürgen Wolff (GDR)
1974 Niendorf	Guy Liljegren (SWE)	Busquet (FRA)	Ilias Hatzipavlis (GRE)
1975 Palamós	Serge Maury (FRA)	David Howlett (GBR)	Adelchi Pelaschier (ITA)
1976 Port Camargue	Serge Maury (FRA)	Andrey Balashov (URS)	Gus Miller (USA)
1977 Istanbul	Joaquín Blanco (ESP)	Minski Fabris (YUG)	Peter Vollebregt (NED)
1978 Marstrand	Sabena Fabris (YUG)	Joaquín Blanco (ESP)	Jochen Schümann (GDR)
1979 Malcesine	John Bertrand (USA)	Jochen Schümann (GDR)	Kent Carlsson (SWE)
1980 Helsinki	Chris Law (GBR)	John Bertrand (USA)	Andrey Balashov (URS)
1981 Faleron	Lasse Hjortnæs (DEN)	Jørgen Lindhartsen (DEN)	Otto Pohlmann (FRG)
1982 Barcelona	Lasse Hjortnæs (DEN)	Mark Neeleman (NED)	Thomas Schmid (FRG)
1983 Neusiedl	Jochen Schümann (GDR)	Frank Butzmann (GDR)	Lasse Hjortnæs (DEN)
1984 Władysławowo	Michael McIntyre (GBR)	Peter Vilby (DEN)	Jacek Sobkowiak (POL)
1985 Athens	Lasse Hjortnæs (DEN)	Jørgen Lindhartsen (DEN)	Peter Vilby (DEN)
1986 Hyères	Oleg Khopersky (URS)	Johan Hedberg (SWE)	Heiko Birke (GDR)
1987 Skovshoved	Stuart Childerley (GB)	Peter Vilby (DEN)	Otto Brandweg (DEN)
1988 Medemblik	José Luis Doreste (ESP)	Eric Mergenthaler (MEX)	Hans Spitzauer (AUT)
1989 Helsinki	Hans Spitzauer (AUT)	Othmar Müller (SUI)	Lauri Rekkardt (FIN)
1990 Hayling Island	Stig Westergaard (DEN)	Hans Spitzauer (AUT)	Othmar Müller (SUI)
1991 Anzio	Lawrence Lemieux (CAN)	José van der Ploeg (ESP)	Kiko Villalonga (ESP)
1992 Gdańsk	Stuart Childerley (GBR)	Oleg Khopersky (URS)	Dirk Löwe (GER)
1993 L'Estartit	Stig Westergaard (DEN)	José van der Ploeg (ESP)	Hans Spitzauer (AUT)
1994 Çeşme	José van der Ploeg (ESP)	Luca Devoti (ITA)	Fredrik Lööf (SWE)
1995 Balatonduned	José van der Ploeg (ESP)	Fredrik Lööf (SWE)	Philippe Presti (FRA)
1996 L'Hospitalet	José van der Ploeg (ESP)	Mateusz Kusznierewicz (POL)	Sébastien Godefroid (BEL)
1997 Split	Luca Devoti (ITA)	Xavier Rohart (FRA)	Aimilios Papathanasiou (GRE)
1998 Vilamoura	Sébastien Godefroid (BEL)	Michal Maier (CZE)	Iain Percy (GBR)
1999 Ostend	Iain Percy (GBR)	Mateusz Kusznierewicz (POL)	Richard Clarke (CAN)
2000 Palma	Mateusz Kusznierewicz (POL)	Karlo Kuret (CRO)	David Burrows (IRL)
2001 Malcesine	Aimilios Papathanasiou (GRE)	Andrew Simpson (GBR)	Xavier Rohart (FRA)
2002 Çeşme	Ben Ainslie (GBR)	Luca Devoti (ITA)	Karlo Kuret (CRO)
2003 Gothenburg	Ben Ainslie (GBR)	Mateusz Kusznierewicz (POL)	Sébastien Godefroid (BEL)
2004 La Rochelle	Mateusz Kusznierewicz (POL)	Ben Ainslie (GBR)	Guillaume Florent (FRA)
2005 Kalmar	Ben Ainslie (GBR)	Dan Slater (NZL)	Gašper Vinčec (SLO)
2006 Palamós	Edward Wright (GBR)	Guillaume Florent (FRA)	Marin Mišura (CRO)
2007 Balatonföldvár	Eduard Skornyakov (RUS)	Ivan Kljaković Gašpić (CRO)	Aimilios Papathanasiou (GRE)
2008 Scarlino	Ben Ainslie (GBR)	Ivan Kljaković Gašpić (CRO)	Guillaume Florent (FRA)
2009 Varna	Ivan Kljaković Gašpić (CRO)	Tapio Nirkko (FIN)	Edward Wright (GBR)
2010 Split	Ivan Kljaković Gašpić (CRO)	Edward Wright (GBR)	Daniel Birgmark (SWE)
2011 Helsinki	Giles Scott (GBR)	Ivan Kljaković Gašpić (CRO)	Andrew Mills (GBR)
2012 Scarlino	Ioannis Mitakis (GRE)	Vasilij Žbogar (SLO)	Ivan Kljaković Gašpić (CRO)
2013 Warnemünde	Vasilij Žbogar (SLO)	Edward Wright (GBR)	Andrew Murdoch (NZL)
2014 La Rochelle	Giles Scott (GBR)	Vasilij Žbogar (SLO)	Edward Wright (GBR)
2015 Split	Ivan Kljaković Gašpić (CRO)	Josh Junior (NZL)	Vasilij Žbogar (SLO)
2016 Barcelona	Pieter-Jan Postma (NED)	Zsombor Berecz (HUN)	Milan Vujasinović (CRO)
2017 Marseille	Jonathan Lobert (FRA)	Edward Wright (GBR)	Ben Cornish (GBR)
2018 Cádiz	Edward Wright (GBR)	Nicholas Heiner (NED)	Max Salminen (SWE)
2019 Athens	Giles Scott (GBR)	Andy Maloney (NZL)	Zsombor Berecz (HUN)
2020 Gdynia	Zsombor Berecz (HUN)	Giles Scott (GBR)	Joan Cardona (ESP)
2021 Vilamoura	Zsombor Berecz (HUN)	Giles Scott (GBR)	Nils Theuninck (SUI)
2023 Csopak	Domonkos Németh (HUN)	Laurent Haÿ (FRA)	Alessandro Marega (ITA)
2024 Cannes	Alessandro Marega (ITA)	Valérian Lebrun (FRA)	Kristóf Kaiser (HUN)
2025 Naples	Valérian Lebrun (FRA)	Federico Colaninno (ITA)	Deniss Karpak (EST)
2026 Gdynia	Martijn van Muyden (NED)	Valérian Lebrun (FRA)	Peter Peet (NED)
