= João Neto =

João Neto can refer to:

== Arts and Entertainment ==
- João Simões Lopes Neto (1865-1916), Brazilian writer
- João Cabral de Melo Neto (1920-1999), Brazilian poet and diplomat
- João Neto & Frederico, Brazilian country music duo

== Sports ==
- João Costa Lima Neto (born 1947), Brazilian swimmer
- João Neto (sailor) (born 1958), Angolan sailor
- Joãozinho Neto (born 1980), Brazilian football forward
- João Neto (judoka) (born 1981), Portuguese judoka
- João Neto (futsal player) (born 1991), Brazilian futsal player
- João Neto (footballer, born May 2003), Brazilian football winger
- João Neto (footballer, born July 2003), Brazilian football forward
