= Sailing at the 1988 Summer Olympics – Finn =

Sailing at the Olympics

Finn class at the Games of the XXIV Olympiad
- Finn class dinghy
- Venue: Busan 부산 釜山
- Dates: 20–27 September
- Competitors: 33 from 33 nations
- Teams: 33

Medalists
1st place, gold medalist(s)		José Luis Doreste	Spain
2nd place, silver medalist(s)		Peter Holmberg	Virgin Islands
3rd place, bronze medalist(s)		John Cutler	New Zealand

The Finn was a sailing event on the Sailing at the 1988 Summer Olympics program in Pusan, South Korea. Seven races were scheduled. 33 sailors, on 33 boats, from 33 nations competed.

== Results ==
Rank	Helmsman (Country)	Race I		Race II		Race III		Race IV		Race V		Race VI		Race VII		Total Points	Total -1
Rank	Helmsman (Country)	Rank	Points	Rank	Points	Rank	Points	Rank	Points	Rank	Points	Rank	Points	Rank	Points	Total Points	Total -1
1st place, gold medalist(s)	José Luis Doreste (ESP)	7	13.0	3	5.7	1	0.0	~~DSQ~~	~~40.0~~	3	5.7	4	8.0	3	5.7	78.1	38.1
2nd place, silver medalist(s)	Peter Holmberg (ISV)	17	23.0	2	3.0	3	5.7	~~PMS~~	~~40.0~~	1	0.0	3	5.7	2	3.0	80.4	40.4
3rd place, bronze medalist(s)	John Cutler (NZL)	9	15.0	~~10~~	~~16.0~~	4	8.0	4	8.0	8	14.0	1	0.0	1	0.0	61.0	45.0
4	Stuart Childerley (GBR)	4	8.0	~~14~~	~~20.0~~	5	10.0	2	3.0	2	3.0	9	15.0	6	11.7	70.7	50.7
5	Lasse Hjortnæs (DEN)	1	0.0	~~RET~~	~~40.0~~	2	3.0	5	10.0	5	10.0	12	18.0	5	10.0	91.0	51.0
6	Thomas Schmid (FRG)	2	3.0	9	15.0	13	19.0	6	11.7	6	11.7	6	11.7	~~RET~~	~~40.0~~	112.1	72.1
7	Roy Heiner (NED)	6	11.7	6	11.7	9	15.0	11	17.0	7	13.0	5	10.0	~~RET~~	~~40.0~~	118.4	78.4
8	Oleg Khoperskiy (URS)	~~DSQ~~	~~40.0~~	11	17.0	DSQ	40.0	1	0.0	4	8.0	2	3.0	7	13.0	121.0	81.0
9	Lauri Rechardt (FIN)	8	14.0	1	0.0	~~RET~~	~~40.0~~	7	13.0	14	20.0	21	27.0	YMP	14.8	128.8	88.8
10	Brian Ledbetter (USA)	16	22.0	12	18.0	8	14.0	10	16.0	~~19~~	~~25.0~~	7	13.0	4	8.0	116.0	91.0
11	Lawrence Lemieux (CAN)	13	19.0	5	10.0	20	26.0	12	18.0	YMP	3.0 (Note: Lemieux was awarded second place in the race, the position he held at the time he left the route in order to rescue Singapore crew in men's 470 class.)	13	19.0	~~21~~	~~27.0~~	122.0	95.0
12	Chris Pratt (AUS)	14	20.0	4	8.0	14	20.0	9	15.0	15	21.0	~~PMS~~	~~40.0~~	9	15.0	139.0	99.0
13	Eric Mergenthaler (MEX)	5	10.0	8	14.0	11	17.0	18	24.0	9	15.0	22	28.0	~~DNC~~	~~40.0~~	148.0	108.0
14	Armanto Ortolano (GRE)	11	17.0	15	21.0	17	23.0	15	21.0	~~DNF~~	~~40.0~~	15	21.0	10	16.0	159.0	119.0
15	Hans Spitzauer (AUT)	~~DSQ~~	~~40.0~~	13	19.0	DSQ	17.0	3	5.7	12	18.0	YMP	40.0	14	20.0	159.7	119.7
16	Mats Caap (SWE)	10	16.0	~~24~~	~~30.0~~	12	18.0	22	28.0	11	17.0	14	20.0	17	23.0	152.0	122.0
17	Gonzalo Campero (ARG)	20	26.0	23	29.0	7	13.0	~~RET~~	~~40.0~~	13	19.0	8	14.0	16	22.0	163.0	123.0
18	Antal Székely (HUN)	12	18.0	20	26.0	15	21.0	13	19.0	18	24.0	18	24.0	11	17.0	149.0	123.0
19	Jorge Zarif Neto (BRA)	~~19~~	~~25.0~~	17	23.0	18	24.0	16	22.0	YMP	21.0	11	17.0	13	19.0	151.0	126.0
20	Henryk Blaszka (POL)	18	24.0	19	25.0	10	16.0	~~23~~	~~29.0~~	16	22.0	20	26.0	8	14.0	156.0	127.0
21	William O'Hara (IRL)	3	5.7	16	22.0	21	27.0	8	14.0	17	23.0	~~DSQ~~	~~40.0~~	RET	40.0	171.7	131.7
22	Paolo Semeraro (ITA)	23	29.0	7	13.0	6	11.7	17	23.0	~~DSQ~~	~~40.0~~	10	16.0	RET	40.0	172.7	132.7
23	Luc Choley (FRA)	24	30.0	22	28.0	19	25.0	14	20.0	10	16.0	19	25.0	~~RET~~	~~40.0~~	184.0	144.0
24	Halit Haluk Babacan (TUR)	15	21.0	~~21~~	~~27.0~~	22	28.0	20	26.0	21	27.0	17	23.0	15	21.0	173.0	145.0
25	Park Kil-chul (KOR)	22	28.0	18	24.0	23	29.0	21	27.0	22	28.0	~~DSQ~~	~~40.0~~	12	18.0	194.0	154.0
26	Takayoshi Takasawa (JPN)	21	27.0	25	31.0	16	22.0	19	25.0	~~RET~~	~~40.0~~	23	29.0	RET	40.0	214.0	174.0
27	Nicholas Bryan (HKG)	26	32.0	26	32.0	25	31.0	~~27~~	~~33.0~~	23	29.0	24	30.0	18	24.0	211.0	178.0
28	Shane Atwell (BAR)	27	33.0	28	34.0	27	33.0	28	34.0	~~RET~~	~~40.0~~	26	32.0	19	25.0	231.0	191.0
29	Colin Philp (FIJ)	~~RET~~	~~40.0~~	30	36.0	26	32.0	24	30.0	24	30.0	DSQ	40.0	20	26.0	234.0	194.0
30	Philippe Battaglia (MON)	28	34.0	29	35.0	24	30.0	25	31.0	~~RET~~	~~40.0~~	PMS	40.0	22	28.0	238.0	198.0
31	Eddy Sulistianto (INA)	25	31.0	27	33.0	29	35.0	26	32.0	~~DNF~~	~~40.0~~	25	31.0	RET	40.0	242.0	202.0
32	Gary Griffin (GUM)	29	35.0	31	37.0	28	34.0	29	35.0	~~DNF~~	~~40.0~~	27	33.0	23	29.0	243.0	203.0
33	Nestor Soriano (PHI)	~~RET~~	~~40.0~~	RET	40.0	30	36.0	30	36.0	DNC	40.0	PMS	40.0	RET	40.0	272.0	232.0

DNF = Did not finish, DSQ = Disqualified, PMS = Premature start
Crossed out results did not count for the total result.
= Male, = Female

=== Daily standings ===
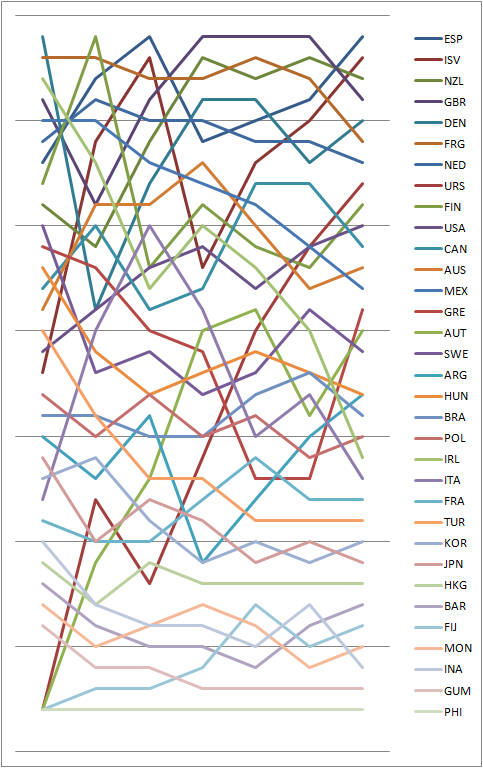
Graph showing the daily standings in the Finn during the 1988 Summer Olympics
