= Faʻafaite =

Reconstructed Polynesian voyaging canoe

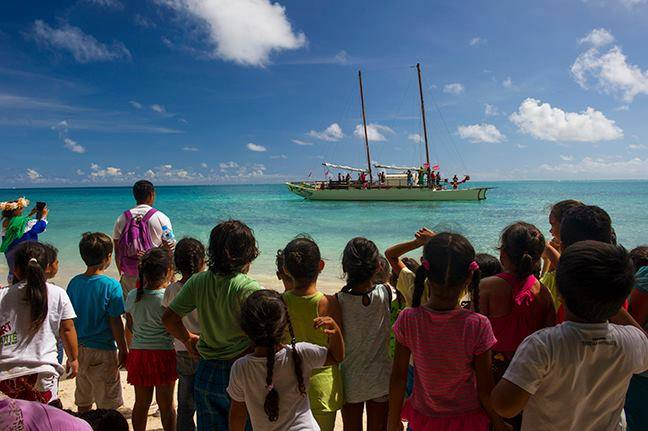
- Fa'afaite in Raivavae, 2019

History

French Polynesia
- Name: Faʻafaite
- Owner: Fa’afaite-Tahiti Voyaging Society
- Builder: Salthouse Boatbuilders
- Launched: 2009
- Status: Active

General characteristics
- Class & type: Vaka Moana
- Tonnage: 13 tonnes
- Length: 72 ft (22 m) overall
- Beam: 21 ft (6.4 m)
- Draft: 6 ft (1.8 m)
- Propulsion: Sail / PV electric
- Sail plan: crabclaw sails
- Complement: 14-16

Faʻafaite is a reconstruction of a double-hulled Polynesian voyaging canoe. It was built in 2009 by the Okeanos Foundation for the Sea. It is operated by the Fa’afaite-Tahiti Voyaging Society and used to teach used to teach Polynesian navigation.

== Construction ==
Faʻafaite is one of eight vaka moana built for the Okeanos Foundation for the Sea and gifted to Pacific voyaging societies. The vaka hulls are constructed of fiberglass, The wood beams are connected to the hulls with traditional lashings. The two masts are rigged with crab claw sails, with bermuda rigged sails for safety during long voyages. It is fitted with a 1 kW photovoltaic array powering a 4 kW electric motor. It was constructed at Salthouse Boatbuilders in Auckland, New Zealand.

== Voyages ==
- In October 2010 Faʻafaite sailed to Huahine.
- In 2011 it visited San Diego as part of a fleet of six traditional canoes which voyaged across the Pacific to the USA.
- In 2011 - 2012 it was part of the Te Mana o Te Moana (Spirit of the Ocean) fleet of six vaka which visited 15 Pacific nations to spread knowledge of voyaging culture and advocate for ocean conservation.
- In March and April 2017 Faʻafaite voyaged to the Austral Islands to support the Rāhui nui no Tuha'a Pae marine reserve project. The expedition discovered significant coral bleaching in Rurutu.
- In June 2017 it sailed to hawaii to rendezvous with Hōkūleʻa.
- In August 2019 it sailed from Tahiti to New Zealand as part of the Tuia 250 to mark first contact between Māori and Pākehā in New Zealand in 1769. It arrived in Tauranga on 14 September 2019, after a journey of one month.
- In June 2021 it sailed to Raiatea.
