= Tall Paul =

Tall Paul may refer to:

- Tall Paul (song), a 1959 song by Annette Funicello
- Tall Paul (DJ), English DJ, producer and remixer
- Paul Sturgess (basketball), British basketball player
- Paul Whybrew, Page of the Backstairs to Queen Elizabeth II until her death in 2022
