= Zsombor Berecz =

Zsombor Berecz may refer to:

- Zsombor Berecz (sailor) (born 1986), Hungarian sailor
- Zsombor Berecz (footballer) (born 1995), Hungarian footballer
