= Burleigh Community College =

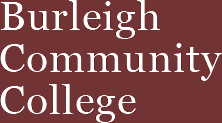

Location
- Thorpe Hill; Loughborough, Leicestershire, LE11 4SQ; England; 52.76996°N 1.24018°W

Information
- Type: Foundation School
- Motto: "Learning for life"
- Established: 1690
- Closed: 2012
- Local authority: Leicestershire
- Specialist: Sports
- Department for Education URN: 120236 Tables
- Principal: Mark Sutton
- Gender: Coeducational
- Age: 14 to 18
- Colours: Maroon and black
- Website: web.archive.org/web/20120625112704/http://www.burleigh.org.uk/

Burleigh Community College was a specialist Sports College located on Thorpe Hill in Loughborough, Leicestershire, England.

== History ==
The origins of the school can be traced to the will of Bartholomew Hickling, a leading citizen of Loughborough, who in 1683 provided an endowment for a girls' school - to match the existing grammar school for boys. The Hickling School for Girls opened in 1690 and lasted until 1876 when, with the pressures of industrialisation, it became the Hickling Boys' School. In 1917 it underwent a further change becoming a Junior Technical School, under the control of Dr Schofield's Loughborough Technical Institute (or Loughborough College as it became known, later Loughborough University). In 1921 the word "Technical" was dropped and, as Loughborough Junior College, the school became a grammar school for boys.

The first boarders joined the school in 1923; there were three, one each from New Zealand, Shanghai and Puerto Rico. The first boarding house was in Victoria Street under Mr. & Mrs. Mason and nicknamed the "Masonic Lodge". By 1926 there were eighteen boarders. The numbers continued to increase and in 1933 the College purchased Field House for £4000 which is still in use today. In 1971 the boy boarders moved to Charnwood Hall, newly purchased by the Leicestershire County Council and Field House became the boarding house for girls (today both boys and girls use Field House).

In 1938 came yet another change of name, this time to Loughborough College School.

Dr. Schofield the principal of the Senior College retired in 1950. With his retirement came the transfer of the school to the Leicestershire Education Committee. At the same time the Junior College of Art, which was part of the Colleges Art department, was also merged with the school, bringing with it fifty girls making the school coeducational. The re-admittance of girls after a break of 75 years. The first boarder joined the school in 1952 and 10 years later Field House was purchased to house 50 boys from overseas.

With these increasing numbers, new buildings were planned and in 1956 the College moved to its present site at Thorpe Hill. Even then the buildings were not large enough and the two junior years remained in the William Street huts until 1962. In 1967 Loughborough College School became a co-educational upper school taking pupils from fourteen to nineteen under the Leicestershire Plan. In 1972 Burleigh Community College was founded "as a base where all members of the community can be involved in their own education" and in 1997 Burleigh became one of the first six Specialist Sports Colleges in the country.

As of September 2012 Burleigh Community College and Garendon High School merged to become Charnwood College, a through school from ages 11 to 19.

== Campus ==
Burleigh had a large facilitated campus, which was spread over four main blocks; K, S, E and G, along with Sports Facilities. Before the closure of the school, Block G was mainly homed to the English, Expressive Arts, Music, PE Theory and the majority of the Science departments. Block G also contained the Main Hall which was where assemblies were held for the lower school and Year 12 (as the Burleigh Centre had become too small) and the main canteen. Block G also housed the Gymnasium, Multi-Workout Gym and a changing room that could be used by either gender PE group. Block E was another large block which was located furthest from the main road, residing nearer to the fields; this was where the ICT, Business and Humanities departments were all situated as well as the School's LRC (Learning Resource Centre / Library), the Post16 only area (The Grove Room) and a dance studio. Block S was fully dedicated to lessons such as Design, Textiles and Art and computer access rooms, it also housed a dance studio. Block K was the newest out of the four blocks and housed Languages and Mathematics. Meanwhile, Biology had a separate set of classrooms which were attached to S Block and were also counted as part of S Block. The school had a Sports Centre, Sports Hall, heated indoor swimming pool, outdoor pitches, an athletics track and all-weather pitch.

== Community ==
As well as students using the college's facilities, most were open for adult classes as well. On site there was a nursery and an all day open day care centre for adults with physical disabilities. Some local primary/infant schools and high/secondary schools (Thorpe Acre, Boothwood, Garendon High School) used the sports coaching and swimming pool, in lessons.

== Results ==
In 2007, results improved from 43% 5A*-C to 57%.

After the 2009 Ofsted report, the college was put on special measures due to the following reasons:

Safeguarding
The school did not comply with government requirements for the safety of pupils. (A technical problem of not having updated their policy on the official database).

Equal opportunities
The college failed to tackle the differences in performance between boys and girls. (A technical problem of not having updated their policy on the official database).

Attainment
Attainment has remained consistently low over the past three years and students have made significantly less progress than they should in English and mathematics.

As of October 2010, Burleigh Community College passed a follow-up inspection by Ofsted.

== Notable former pupils ==
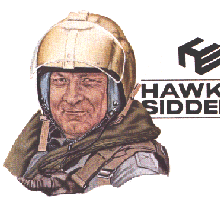
Bill Bedford

- Stuart Childerley, Finn class sailor in the 1988 (4th) and 1992 (4th) Summer Olympics

=== Loughborough College School ===
- Dave Bartram, singer of Showaddywaddy (left in 1967)
- Bill Bedford OBE AFC FRAeS, chief test pilot from 1956-67 for Hawker Siddeley, the first to fly the Hawker Siddeley Harrier on 28 December 1967
- Tom Hancock, the main town planner of Peterborough and Milton Keynes
- Robin Jackman, producer for BBC West
- Steve Tilston, folk singer with Maggie Boyle
- Tony Wadsworth (radio presenter), formerly of BBC Radio Leicester

== Former teachers ==
- Colin Gray, the British 1976 Olympic canoe team coach, taught Physics
