= Paul Sturgess =

Paul Sturgess is the name of:

- Paul Sturgess (footballer) (born 1975), English former professional footballer
- Paul Sturgess (basketball) (born 1987), English former professional basketball player
