= Christian Schroder =

Christian Schroder may refer to:

- Christian Schrøder, Danish film actor, screenwriter and director
- Christian Schröder, German sailor
