= Camakau =

Traditional Fijian watercraft

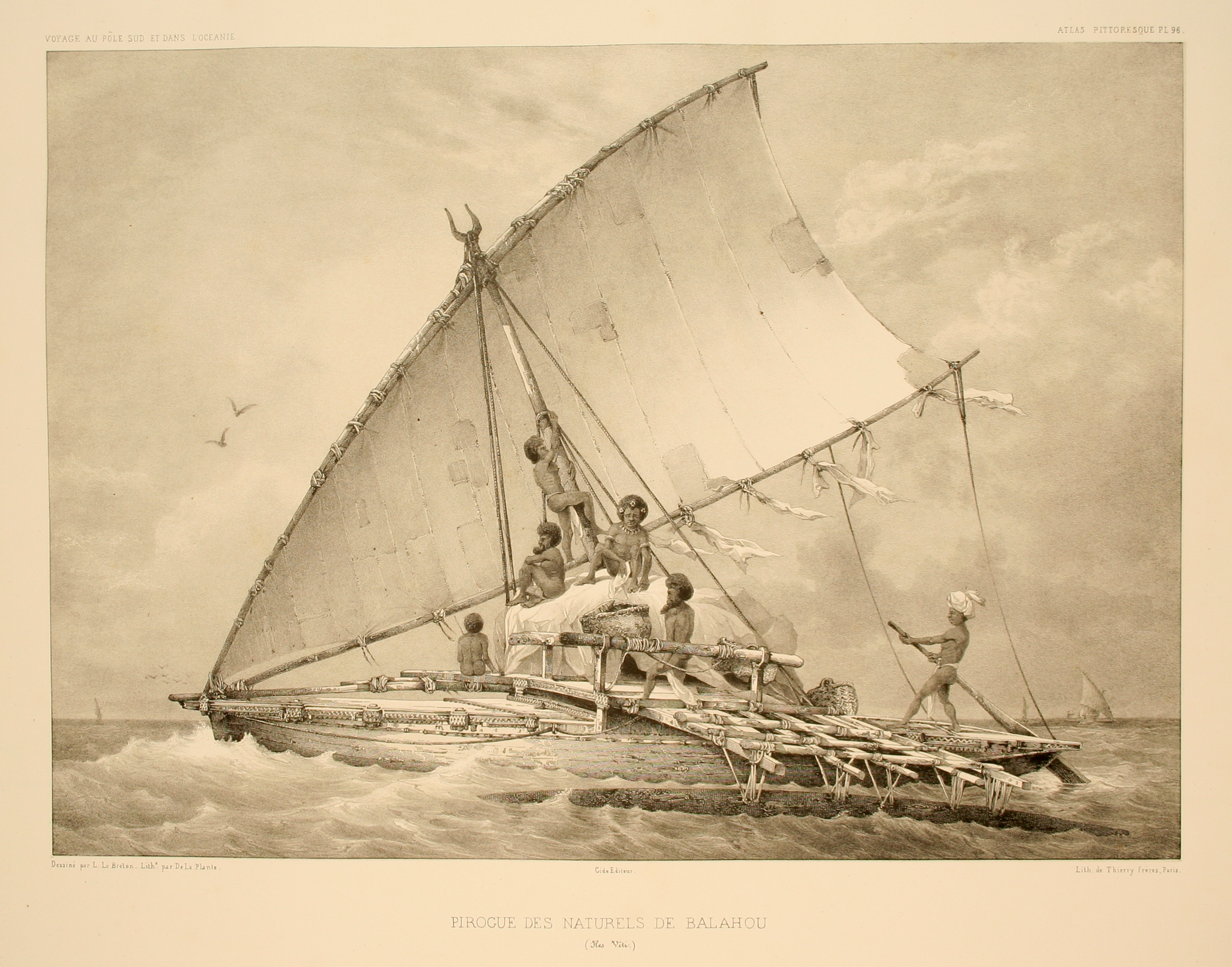
1846 drawing of the boats from Fiji

Camakau (Fijian pronunciation: [ða ma kau], sometimes spelled thamakau) are a traditional watercraft of Fiji. Part of the broader Austronesian tradition, they are similar to catamarans, outrigger canoes, or smaller versions of the drua, but are larger than a takia. These vessels were built primarily for the purposes of travelling between islands and for trade. These canoes are single hulled, with an outrigger and a cama, a float, with both ends of the hull being symmetrical. They were very large, capable of travelling open ocean, and have been recorded as being up to 70 ft in length.

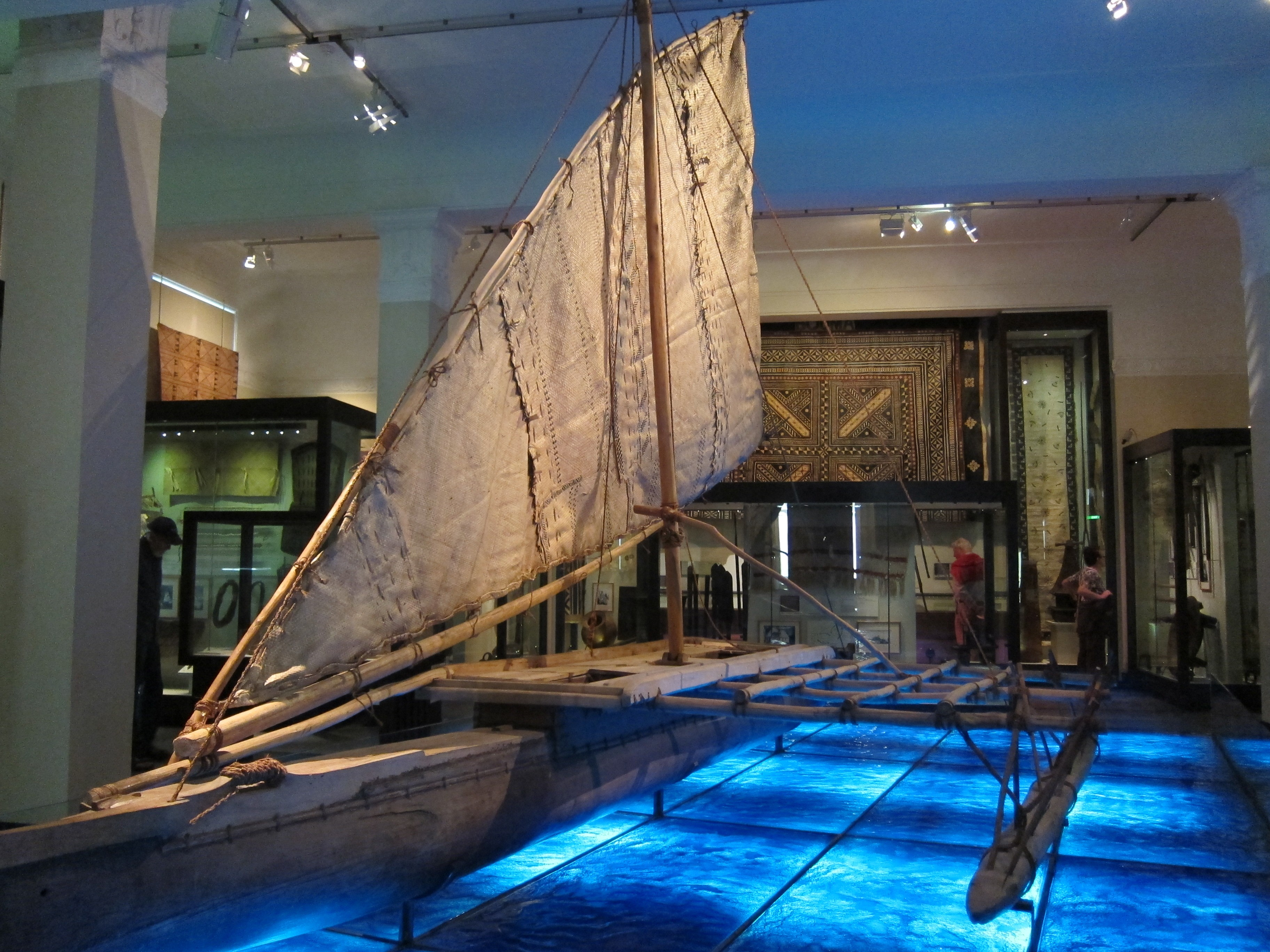
A camakau in a museum

Not until Suva did we meet islanders who recognized Celerity's lineage. "Like Fiji canoe! Very fast! Very good!" We were able to judge the accuracy of this pierhead analysis by chasing an outrigger thamakau across the blustery Viti Levu lagoon. In those minutes we closed a gap of centuries. Progenitor and descendant... the sennit-lashed proa with her crab-claw sail matched the trimaran's space-age profile and epoxy fastenings in speed—and sophistication. In the crossing of our wakes an era came full circle.

— Randy Thomas (1984)

== History ==
It is theorised that the camakau was invented in the mid-1700s. In the comprehensive research of D'Arcy. P, Nuttal. P & Philip. C (2014), it is suggested that the main influences in the design of the camakau is Micronesian for the sail rig, particularly via Tonga. There are also Polynesian influences in the design of the canoe. The islands of Lau are located between Fiji and Tonga, and span over 250 nautical islands, meaning that the development of the camakau here was influenced by both of these regions, and the other water vessels of the Lau group.

As stated in "Canoes of Oceania", the camakau was particularly used in travelling between islands, and for chiefs of islands to visit each other. These boats were not used for the purpose of war.

The use of the camakau declined greatly in the mid-19th century, being replaced by European boats. However, the camakau has been recorded travelling between Fiji and Tonga even in the early 1900s, preferred by traditional users to European cutter.

== Current use ==
Camakaus are still used in the traditional region today, particularly in the islands in the Lau group. The camakau is culturally perceived as old fashioned when used today, however, economic and environmental reasons make the camakau a very effective alternative to motorboats. The effects of climate change are being particularly felt by Fiji and the surrounding islands due to changing weather patterns as well as rising sea levels, and the associated economic impact of this. Thus, the camakau is being implemented back into society due to its environmental and economic benefits. Gianne. B (2010) states that modern camakaus' are also implementing nails, marine glue, rope and Styrofoam, taking the traditional design and making it more effective to be used in modern society.

The camakau is being used in islands where transportation is difficult, particularly due to the price of fuel and motorboats. The Uto Ni Yalo Trust is an organisation which gifts traditional Fijian canoes to island communities. In 2020, the Trust gifted five Camakaus to villagers of Nasesara, of which the village elder, Vilive Waqavuka said:

Transportation has always been a challenge because fuel is costly and we have to use fibreglass boats to travel to Levuka Market to sell our produce. With these canoes, fuel is not required. We can save fuel money to buy essential items for our families.

Further, it has been said that in this community, the boats will help with sustainable fishing practices, as the islanders search for food to feed their family, opposed to fishing in abundance so that they are able to sell them at the market, to be able to afford fish.

When building the camakau today, there is an issue of sourcing the wood. This is because the vesi timber, or Intsia bijuga, is no longer in abundance. There is a commercial production of wooden bowls made from this wood, which is affecting the supply of wood available for canoe building. Further the economic and social difficulties currently being felt in the Fijian region will place pressure on the ability of the society to reasonably fund and create these canoes.

There is growing tourism in Fiji for these traditional canoes to be seen in museums, and on the water as well as for models of the canoes in many countries, including New Zealand.

== Construction and design ==
The defining features of the camakau is that it is a single hulled canoe, with a small outrigger boom, and a cama, a float. The camakau is occasionally made in two pieces, in which case it is called a veikoso. An outrigger is a long piece of wood, approximately the length of canoe, attached and parallel to the canoe. The object of the outrigger is to prevent the canoe from upsetting. This canoe has no mast or sail in some of traditional designs which have been excavated by archeologists. The hull is a dugout log, usually a single trunk, but in the case of larger vessels could be two trunks joined together. The design is very similar to the drua, although the drua is double hulled. Fijian canoes have been recorded to be between 55 ft and 70 ft in length, making the camakau able to sail in open ocean, and even travel between Fiji and Tonga. The rig of the camakau, from its Polynesian origins, has a narrower tack angle, and a lower yard.

Local materials of the Lau island group, where these canoes have been mostly found to be built, are used in the construction of the canoe. The hard wood Intsia bijuga is used to construct the hull as well as masthead, mast step, and steering oar, where durability is most necessary. This wood is also called greenhart or vesi, which grow in rocky areas. There are other very important components to the design of the canoe. Two types of cordage are used, sennit and rigging rope. Sennit, made from the mesocarp of the coconut fruit, is used for lashing various parts of the canoe together. This material is made by cooking the mesocarp of the coconuts in an underground oven, and after several hours of this, beaten. These fibres are then braided to be used for lashing. Rigging rope is made from bark by removing the outer layer of phloem, leaving it to dry, and then twisting the fibres to form a rope.

Due to their ability to go at high speeds, carry many people, and survive the harsh conditions of the ocean, David Lewis a Pacific maritime specialist described the camakau as 'the pinnacle of Oceanic canoe technology'.

In the canoes built today, the camakau is between 7 and 9 metres in length with a single sail, and the outrigger, the cama, is about 60% of the length of canoe.

== Sailing techniques ==
When sailing the camakau, they are sailed with the outrigger to windward. When they are being sailed upwind, the camakau will change across the eye of the wind, in a manoeuvre called shunting or cave. In this manoeuvre of shunting, the steering paddle at the stern is moved to the bow, and the tack of the sail rig is taken to the stern. This allows the outrigger to remain towards the windward side.

In the event that the camakau capsizes, the crew drags the craft into shallow water, when able to, and raises the outrigger over the main hull. This corrects the vessel to be able to be sailed again. When offshore, the crew will attempt to sink the outrigger, so that it passes through the water under the canoe, and flips the hull.

== Cultural significance ==
The camakau is traditionally built by "matai", meaning "carpenters", who came from a carpenter clan. These canoes could only be built by a member of these clans, which were either the "lemaki" or "matai sau" clans. This tradition is not maintained presently, and only the position of head carpenter must be held by a member of one of these clans. The primary role of the head carpenter is to oversee and coordinate the construction and workmen. The labour for the construction of the canoe is primarily carried out by the men, as it is traditionally taboo for women to come into contact with the canoes. The elders perform the tasks which require the most skill, and the youth carry out the more strenuous work such as heavy lifting. Women would normally contribute by weaving mats used to create the sails.

There are many culturally significant ceremonies which occur prior to, during and after the construction of the camakau. According to Banack. A. S and Cox. P. A (1987), prior to the building of the canoe, those wishing for the construction to occur must present the chief of the island with a "tabua", a sperm whale tooth, this being their official appeal. After this, the chief consults the village elders as to whether it is sensible for this construction to occur, with another "tabua" being presented. Next, the chief carpenter is chosen with the presentation of another sperm whale's tooth to a carpenter by a village elder. Further, throughout the construction process, seven feasts occur. The first occurs when the head carpenter is chosen. The other six feasts occur throughout construction at various stages of completion.

According to Hocart. A. M (1929), a race is held when the canoe is first set afloat in which young men race towards village girls who are holding poles with bark cloth. The first to catch a fleeing girl gets all the prizes he is able to hold, with the remaining prizes being divided between the carpenters.

Currently, there is an original, traditional camakau in the Fiji Museum.
