= Gary Griffin =

Gary Griffin may refer to:

- Gary Griffin (director), American theater director
- Gary Griffin (musician), American musician
- Gary Griffin (sailor), Guamanian Olympic sailor
