= Colin Philp =

Colin Philp may refer to:

- Colin Philp Sr. (born 1947), Fijian sailor
- Colin Philp Jr. (1964–2021), Fijian sailor
