= Takayoshi Takasawa =

Japanese sailor

Personal information
- Native name: 高澤 孝吉
- Nationality: Japanese
- Born: 10 June 1956 (age 70)

Sailing career
- Sport: Sailing

Achievements and titles
- Olympic finals: 1988 Summer Olympics

Takayoshi Takasawa (高澤 孝吉, Takasawa Takayoshi; born 10 June 1956) is a Japanese sailor. He competed in the Finn event at the 1988 Summer Olympics.
