= Nicholas Bryan =

Hong Kong sailor (born 1955)

Personal information
- Nationality: Hongkonger
- Born: 3 November 1955 (age 70)

Nicholas Bryan (born 3 November 1955) is a Hong Kong sailor. He competed in the Finn event at the 1988 Summer Olympics.
