= Mark Swanson =

United States Virgin Islands sailor

Personal information
- Full name: Mark Elston Swanson
- Nationality: American Virgin Islander
- Born: September 21, 1952 (age 72)

Sport
- Sport: Sailing

Mark Elston Swanson (born September 21, 1952) is a sailor who represented the United States Virgin Islands. He competed in the Finn event at the 1992 Summer Olympics.
