= Sailing at the 1992 Summer Olympics – Finn =

Sailing at the Olympics

Finn Men's at the Games of the XXV Olympiad
- Finn class dinghy
- Venue: Barcelona
- Dates: 27 July to 3 August
- Competitors: 29 from 29 nations
- Teams: 29

Medalists
1st place, gold medalist(s)		José van der Ploeg	Spain
2nd place, silver medalist(s)		Brian Ledbetter	United States
3rd place, bronze medalist(s)		Craig Monk	New Zealand

The Finn Men's Competition was a sailing event on the Sailing at the 1992 Summer Olympics program in Barcelona. Seven races were scheduled. 29 sailors, on 29 boats, from 29 nations competed.

== Results ==
Rank	Helmsman (Country)	Race I		Race II		Race III		Race IV		Race V		Race VI		Race VII		Total Points	Total -1
Rank	Helmsman (Country)	Rank	Points	Rank	Points	Rank	Points	Rank	Points	Rank	Points	Rank	Points	Rank	Points	Total Points	Total -1
1	José van der Ploeg (ESP)	2	3.0	6	11.7	3	5.7	5	10.0	2	3.0	1	0.0	~~DNC~~	~~36.0~~	69.4	33.4
2	Brian Ledbetter (USA)	~~12~~	~~18.0~~	1	0.0	4	8.0	10	16.0	10	16.0	2	3.0	6	11.7	72.7	54.7
3	Craig Monk (NZL)	~~23~~	~~29.0~~	11	17.0	1	0.0	7	13.0	17	23.0	6	11.7	1	0.0	93.7	64.7
4	Stuart Childerley (GBR)	3	5.7	~~13~~	~~19.0~~	6	11.7	6	11.7	12	18.0	4	8.0	7	13.0	87.1	68.1
5	Fredrik Lööf (SWE)	19	25.0	3	5.7	2	3.0	8	14.0	~~22~~	~~28.0~~	7	13.0	4	8.0	96.7	68.7
6	Othmar Müller von Blumencron (SUI)	7	13.0	2	3.0	7	13.0	~~PMS~~	~~36.0~~	7	13.0	8	14.0	8	14.0	106.0	70.0
7	Xavier Rohart (FRA)	5	10.0	5	10.0	~~13~~	~~19.0~~	4	8.0	5	10.0	12	18.0	13	19.0	94.0	75.0
8	Hans Spitzauer (AUT)	9	15.0	~~18~~	~~24.0~~	5	10.0	15	21.0	3	5.7	3	5.7	16	22.0	103.4	79.4
9	Armanto Ortolano (GRE)	18	24.0	7	13.0	~~PMS~~	~~36.0~~	1	0.0	6	11.7	9	15.0	12	18.0	117.7	81.7
10	Christoph Bergmann (BRA)	1	0.0	8	14.0	~~16~~	~~22.0~~	13	19.0	9	15.0	10	16.0	14	20.0	106.0	84.0
11	Arif Gürdenlı (TUR)	6	11.7	~~21~~	~~27.0~~	15	21.0	17	23.0	1	0.0	16	22.0	11	17.0	121.7	94.7
12	Stig Westergaard (DEN)	13	19.0	10	16.0	~~24~~	~~30.0~~	9	15.0	15	21.0	15	21.0	3	5.7	127.7	97.7
13	Hank Lammens (CAN)	4	8.0	~~DSQ~~	~~36.0~~	PMS	36.0	2	3.0	21	27.0	19	25.0	2	3.0	138.0	102.0
14	Emanuele Vaccari (ITA)	17	23.0	17	23.0	12	18.0	~~19~~	~~25.0~~	13	19.0	5	10.0	5	10.0	128.0	103.0
15	Peter Aldag (GER)	21	27.0	9	15.0	8	14.0	~~PMS~~	~~36.0~~	4	8.0	14	20.0	18	24.0	144.0	108.0
16	Oleg Khopyorsky (EUN)	15	21.0	4	8.0	17	23.0	11	17.0	8	14.0	~~21~~	~~27.0~~	19	25.0	135.0	108.0
17	Jali Mäkilä (FIN)	11	17.0	14	20.0	19	25.0	3	5.7	~~24~~	~~30.0~~	25	31.0	9	15.0	143.7	112.7
18	Ian Ainslie (RSA)	10	16.0	12	18.0	11	17.0	16	22.0	11	17.0	17	23.0	~~20~~	~~26.0~~	139.0	113.0
19	Eric Mergenthaler (MEX)	8	14.0	20	26.0	10	16.0	12	18.0	~~23~~	~~29.0~~	13	19.0	15	21.0	143.0	114.0
20	Glenn Bourke (AUS)	16	22.0	16	22.0	~~PMS~~	~~36.0~~	14	20.0	19	25.0	11	17.0	17	23.0	165.0	129.0
21	Attila Szilvássy (HUN)	20	26.0	15	21.0	9	15.0	18	24.0	20	26.0	18	24.0	~~21~~	~~27.0~~	163.0	136.0
22	Karlo Kuret (CRO)	22	28.0	19	25.0	14	20.0	20	26.0	16	22.0	~~23~~	~~29.0~~	10	16.0	166.0	137.0
23	Mark Swanson (ISV)	14	20.0	22	28.0	18	24.0	22	28.0	14	20.0	~~26~~	~~32.0~~	22	28.0	180.0	148.0
24	José Sambolin (PUR)	25	31.0	24	30.0	20	26.0	21	27.0	18	24.0	24	30.0	~~26~~	~~32.0~~	200.0	168.0
25	Mark Clarke (CAY)	~~26~~	~~32.0~~	23	29.0	22	28.0	23	29.0	25	31.0	22	28.0	23	29.0	206.0	174.0
26	Andrew Burke (BAR)	24	30.0	~~26~~	~~32.0~~	21	27.0	25	31.0	26	32.0	20	26.0	25	31.0	209.0	177.0
27	Franklyn Braithwaite (ANT)	~~28~~	~~34.0~~	25	31.0	23	29.0	24	30.0	27	33.0	28	34.0	24	30.0	221.0	187.0
28	João Neto (ANG)	~~27~~	~~33.0~~	27	33.0	25	31.0	26	32.0	28	34.0	27	33.0	27	33.0	229.0	195.0
29	Nigel Rausi (MLT)	~~DNC~~	~~36.0~~	DNC	36.0	DNC	36.0	DNC	36.0	DNC	36.0	DNC	36.0	DNC	36.0	252.0	216.0

=== Daily standings ===
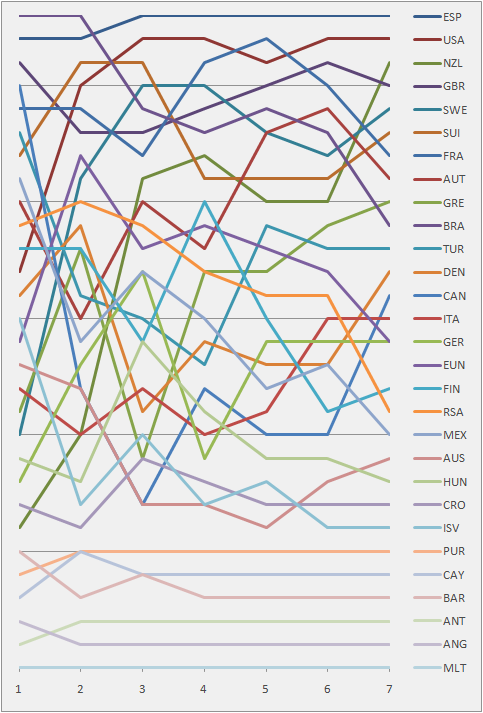
Graph showing the daily standings in the Finn during the 1992 Summer Olympics
