= Nestor Soriano =

Filipino sailor (1953–2021)

Personal information
- Nationality: Filipino
- Born: 16 October 1953
- Died: 3 September 2021 (aged 67); Antique, Philippines

Sport
- Sport: Sailing

Nestor Soriano (16 October 1953 – 3 September 2021) was a Filipino sailor. He was discovered while working for the Manila Yacht Club. He competed in the Finn event at the 1988 Summer Olympics and at the 1993 SEA Games. Later on, he became a sailing instructor for the Manila Yacht Club as well as the Taal and Iloilo Yacht Clubs.

Soriano was married to Susan and had four children. He died of complications from COVID-19 in September 2021.
