= Andrew Burke (sailor) =

Barbadian sailor (1949–2009)

Personal information
- Born: 25 March 1949 Bridgetown, Barbados
- Died: 5 April 2009 (aged 60)

Sport
- Sport: Sailing

Owen Andrew Burke (25 March 1949 – 5 April 2009) was a Barbadian sailor. He competed in the Finn event at the 1992 Summer Olympics.
