= José Sambolin =

Puerto Rican sailor

Personal information
- Full name: José Alfredo Sambolin Rodríguez
- Nationality: Puerto Rican
- Born: 16 July 1958 (age 67)

Sport
- Sport: Sailing

José Alfredo Sambolin Rodríguez (Note: In this Spanish name, the first or paternal surname is Sambolin and the second or maternal family name is Rodríguez.) (born 16 July 1958) is a Puerto Rican sailor. He competed in the Finn event at the 1992 Summer Olympics.
