= Hans Spitzauer =

Austrian sailor

Personal information
- Full name: Johann Spitzauer
- Nickname: Hans
- Nationality: Austria
- Born: 1 March 1965 (age 61) Vienna, Austria
- Height: 1.80 m (5 ft 11 in)
- Weight: 90 kg (198 lb)

Sport

Sailing career
- Class(es): Dinghy, keelboat
- Club: Union Yacht Club
Medal record
Men's sailing
Representing Austria
World Championships
Gold medal – first place	1995 Melbourne	Finn
Silver medal – second place	1996 La Rochelle	Finn
Bronze medal – third place	1992 Cadiz	Finn
European Championships
Gold medal – first place	1989 Helsinki	Finn
Silver medal – second place	1990 Hayling Island	Finn
Bronze medal – third place	1993 L'Estartit	Finn

Johann "Hans" Spitzauer (German pronunciation: [hans ˈʃpɪt͡saʊ̯ɐ], born 1 March 1965) is an Austrian former sailor, who specialized in both Finn and Star classes. He was named the country's top Finn sailor in the first three editions of his Olympic career (1988, 1992, and 1996) and came closest to the medal haul in Atlanta 1996, finishing in fourth place. After missing out his Sydney 2000 bid, he moved into the Star class and eventually partnered with Andreas Hanakamp to compete at his fourth Olympics in Athens 2004 and with Christian Nehammer at his fifth in Beijing 2008. Outside the Games, Spitzauer was deemed one of the world's most successful Finn sailors in the early to mid-1990s, receiving a complete set of medals with one in each color (gold, silver, and bronze) at the Finn Gold Cup and the Finn European Championships, respectively.

== Career ==
=== Early years ===
Spitzauer made his first Austrian team in Seoul 1988, finishing fifteenth in the open Finn class with a net grade of 119.70. After his maiden Olympics, Spitzauer rose to prominence with his first-ever triumph at the 1989 Finn Europeans in Helsinki, Finland, eventually followed by his elated podium feat in the prestigious Finn Gold Cup three years later. At his succeeding Games in Barcelona 1992, Spitzauer improved upon his feat from Seoul to score a sensational top-eight mark in his pet class with 79.4 net points.

Spitzauer reached the peak of his sailing career in the 1995 season by narrowly overhauling Sweden's Fredrik Lööf for the Finn Gold Cup title in Melbourne. A potential gold medal favorite in Atlanta 1996, however, he slipped out of the podium by the smallest margin behind the Netherlands' Roy Heiner.

=== Transition ===
Spitzauer continued to sail the Finn in the late 1990s, but he took the helm of a threesome Soling boat for the remaining portion of the quadrennial cycle. His bid for Sydney 2000 was cut short, when he lost the selection trials. Taking a year off to reassess other sailing options, Spitzauer decided to move into the Star class and eventually partnered with Andreas Hanakamp in the lead-up to his fourth Olympic trip.

At the 2004 Summer Olympics in Athens, Spitzauer and crew member Hanakamp struggled to chase the world's top sailing crews in the Star class under breezy conditions, before bouncing back to score a couple of top-five marks towards the final stretch. Unable to sail towards the front after eleven races, the Austrian pair accumulated a net grade of 97 for a lowly thirteenth overall out of seventeen registered crews.

Dissatisfied with the Athens 2004 outcome, Spitzauer shelved his retirement plans to pair up with the nine-time legend Hubert Raudaschl for his next Olympiad, but perpetual training and campaigning lost some sailing allure for the latter. He requested the 32-year-old Christian Nehammer to join him in a Star campaign, beginning with the 2006 ISAF World Cup series in Miami. Soon, the new Austrian duo recorded a string of top-ten marks at various international regattas within the quadrennial cycle, including the Kiel Week and the Bacardi Cup.

After missing the Olympic cut at the Worlds in 2007, Spitzauer and crewman Nehammer rebounded from their flimsy outcome in Cascais to punch the last of the four remaining tickets vying for qualification with a successful top 16 finish at the class-associated Worlds in Miami.

Spitzauer served as the country's sailing team captain at his fifth and final Games in Beijing 2008, teaming with the rookie Nehammer in the Star class. There, the Austrian duo posted a triad of top-six marks throughout the ten-race course, but a disastrous feat on the last leg slipped their chances away from the medal round to the twelfth overall spot with 87 net points.
