= Peter Aldag =

German sailor

Personal information
- Nationality: German
- Born: 15 March 1965 (age 60); Stuttgart, Germany

Sport
- Sport: Sailing

Peter Aldag (born 15 March 1965) is a German sailor. He competed in the Finn event at the 1992 Summer Olympics.
