= Colin Philp Jr. =

Fijian sailor (1964–2021)

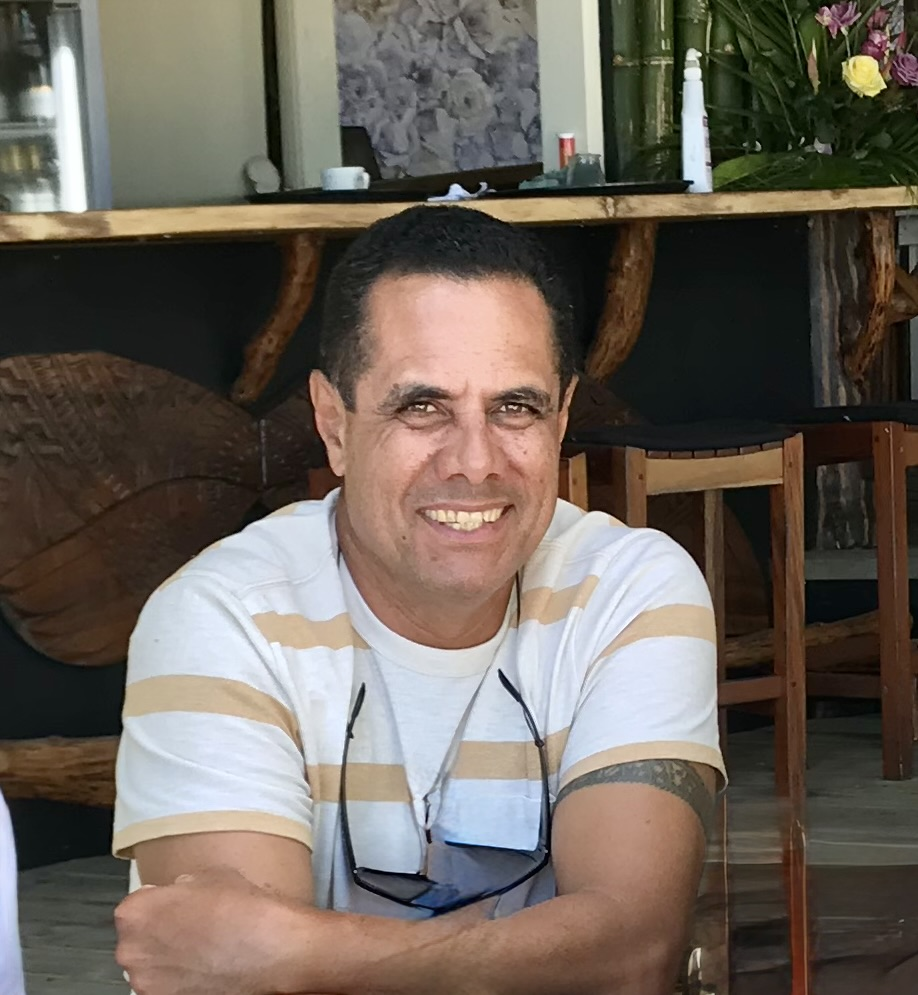
- Colin Philp at Leleuvia Island, April 2018

Personal information
- Born: 24 October 1964 Suva, Fiji
- Died: 25 December 2021 (aged 57) Australia
- Height: 1.83 m (6 ft 0 in)
- Weight: 80 kg (176 lb)

Sailing career
- Sport: Sailing

Colin Philp Jr. (24 October 1964 – 25 December 2021) was a Fijian sailor. He competed in the Finn event at the 1988 Summer Olympics. He came from a prominent Fijian sailing family: his older half-brother Anthony Colin Philp and younger brother David Philp both competed in the 1992 Summer Olympics in the Soling class, with Anthony Colin Philp also competing at the 1988 Summer Olympics; and his nephew Anthony Stephen Philp represented Fiji in five consecutive Olympic Games from 1984 to 2000.

Colin died from liver failure in Australia on 25 December 2021, at the age of 57.

== Uto Ni Yalo Trust and Ocean Advocacy ==
Philp was a co-founder of the Fiji Islands Voyaging Society, later known as the Uto Ni Yalo Trust, which led Fiji's revival of traditional navigation and voyaging beginning in 2009. The trust's vessel, named Uto Ni Yalo (meaning "Heart of Spirit"), blends traditional central Pacific canoe design with modern boat-building materials and technology.

Philp championed sustainable sea transport and the revival of traditional voyaging, with the aim of preserving Pacific navigational skills for future generations. His legacy in ocean advocacy extended across Fiji and the wider Pacific, where he was regarded as a mentor and champion for sustainable tourism, regenerative agriculture, and the arts. At the time of his death, Philp was manager of Leleuvia Island Resort, part of the Duavata Collective, a group of tourism operations committed to enhancing cultural heritage and the environment.
