= Lauri Rechardt =

Finnish sailor

Personal information
- Birth name: Lauri Fredrik Rechardt
- Nationality: Finnish
- Born: 24 April 1965 (age 59); Helsinki, Finland

Lauri Fredrik Rechardt (born 24 April 1965) is a Finnish sailor, educated lawyer. He competed in the Finn event at the 1988 Summer Olympics. He is the brother of Esko Rechardt, a gold medalist at the 1980 Summer Olympics.

Currently Rechardt works as a lawyer at IFPI in London.
