= Franklyn Braithwaite =

Antigua and Barbuda sailor (born 1961)

Franklyn Braithwaite (MBE)
Personal information
- Nationality: Antigua and Barbuda
- Born: 2 February 1961 (age 64)

Sport
- Sport: Sailing

Stedroy Franklyn Braithwaite (born 2 February 1961) is an Antigua and Barbuda sailor. He competed in the Finn event at the 1992 Summer Olympics.

In 2014, he received the title of Grand Officer Most Precious Order of Princely Heritage (GOH) for "distinguished contribution to sailing and community development" in the Independence Honours list. He is currently Commodore of Antigua Yacht Club. and President of the Antigua and Barbuda Marine Association.
