= Eddy Sulistianto =

Indonesian sailor (born 1961)

Personal information
- Nationality: Indonesian
- Born: 16 November 1961 (age 64)

Sailing career
- Sport: Sailing

Eddy Sulistianto (born 16 November 1961) is an Indonesian sailor. He competed in the Finn event at the 1988 Summer Olympics.
