= Attila Szilvássy =

Hungarian sailor

Personal information
- Nationality: Hungarian
- Born: 21 January 1965 (age 60); Budapest, Hungary

Sport
- Sport: Sailing

Attila Szilvássy (born 21 January 1965) is a Hungarian sailor. He competed in the Finn event at the 1992 Summer Olympics.
