= Mats Caap =

Swedish sailor

Personal information
- Birth name: Mats Johan Ersson Caap
- Nationality: Swedish
- Born: 23 October 1957 (age 67); Norrköping, Sweden

Sailing career
- Class(es): Finn, OK
- Club: Varbergs Segelsällskap

Mats Johan Ersson Caap (born 23 October 1957) is a Swedish sailor in the Finn and OK classes. He competed in the Finn event at the 1988 Summer Olympics. He won the 1987 OK World Championship in Luleå.

Caap represented Varbergs Segelsällskap.
