= Boris Jacobsson =

Swedish sailor (1937–2013)

Personal information
- Full name: Boris Alvar Jacobsson
- Nationality: Swedish
- Born: 13 September 1937 Uppsala, Sweden
- Died: 10 February 2013 (aged 75) Uppsala, Sweden

Sailing career
- Sport: Sailing
- Club: Uppsala KF
- Class: Finn
Medal record
Sailing
Representing Sweden
World championships
| Silver medal – second place | 1962 Tönsberg | Finn class |
| Silver medal – second place | 1963 Medemblik | Finn class |
European championships
| Gold medal – first place | 1962 Kiel | Finn class |
| Gold medal – first place | 1963 Tihany | Finn class |

Boris Alvar Jacobsson (13 September 1937 – 10 February 2013) was a Swedish sailor in the Finn class.

Jacobsson was born in Uppsala and represented Uppsala Kanotförening. He won the 1962 Finn European Championship in Kiel, surpassing French Francis Jammes on the last day. In August 1962, he won a silver medal in the World championship, the Finn Gold Cup, in Tönsberg behind Swedish Arne Åkerson.

In 1963, he repeated the results in both the World and European championships: first silver-medalling at the World championship in Medemblik, and then defending the European title in Tihany.

He competed in the Finn event at the 1964 Summer Olympics and finished 14th.

Jacobsson died in Uppsala in 2013.
