= Garendon High School =

The Garendon High School

Location
- Thorpe Hill; Loughborough, Leicestershire, LE11 4SQ; England; 52°46′17″N 1°14′24″W

Information
- Motto: "Teaching Excellence"
- Established: 1954
- Closed: 2012
- Local authority: Leicestershire
- Department for Education URN: 120253 Tables
- Ofsted: Reports
- Head teacher: Mark Sutton
- Gender: Coeducational
- Age: 11 to 14
- Enrolment: 558
- Colours: Red and Black
- Website: http://www.garendon.leics.sch.uk/

Garendon High School was a middle school located in Thorpe Acre, Loughborough, Leicestershire, England.

It contained three years (7, 8 and 9). Altogether, there were 558 pupils in the 2008–2009 school year.

The school closed over Summer 2012.

== History ==
Garendon High School, which opened in 1954, was a middle school for around 560 students aged 11 to 15.

The school was recognized in its 2007 Ofsted inspection as "A good school with many outstanding features".

As of September 2012, Burleigh Community College and Garendon High School merged to become Charnwood College, a through school from ages 11 to 19.

== Awards ==
In September 2008, the school was awarded the status of Specialist Sports College.

It was designated as a "Lead School" by the local authority and achieved International School Status and Healthy Schools Accreditation. The school also achieved the prestigious Artsmark Gold standard.
