= Emanuele Vaccari =

Italian sailor

Personal information
- Nationality: Italian
- Born: 8 July 1966 (age 58); Rome, Italy

Sport
- Sport: Sailing

Emanuele Vaccari (born 8 July 1966) is an Italian sailor. He competed in the Finn event at the 1992 Summer Olympics.
