= Charnwood College =

Location
- Thorpe Hill; Loughborough, Leicestershire, LE11 4SQ; England; 52.76996°N 1.24018°W

Information
- Type: Academy
- Motto: Broadening Horizons
- Established: 2013
- Local authority: Leicestershire
- Department for Education URN: 141874 Tables
- Ofsted: Reports
- Sponsor: The David Ross Education Trust
- Principal: Alastair O'Connor
- Gender: Coeducational
- Age: 11 to 19
- Houses: Challenge Discovery Endeavour Venture
- Colours: Green and orange
- Website: www.charnwoodcollege.org

Charnwood College is a coeducational secondary school and sixth form that is located on Thorpe Hill in Loughborough, Leicestershire, England.

== History ==
Charnwood College can trace its history back to 1690 as the Hickling School for Girls under the will of Bartholemew Hickling.

Burleigh Community College and Garendon High School were merged in 2012, under the working name of 'Thorpe Hill Campus'. The school was officially launched as Charnwood College in 2013.

The school converted to academy status in April 2015 and is now operated by the David Ross Education Trust.

== School traditions and other information ==
Charnwood College provides an all-through education for students aged 11–19 across Loughborough. Charnwood College was the first time two upper schools had been merged in Leicestershire.

Charnwood college inherited the supporters of the two former schools, the Burleigh Pig and the Garendon Stag. The Burleigh Pig became an unofficial supporter and eventually became seen as an official supporter after the installation of a statue of a bronze boar. The Garendon Stag has always been the official supporter of Garendon High School, the stag was adopted as deer were kept on Garendon Park (the school's namesake) and the stag was also featured on the coat of arms of the De Lisle family (the owners of the Garendon Park estate), the school still owns a set of mounted antlers from a Stag that lived on the Garendon Park Estate.

== Campus ==
Charnwood College has a 50-acre (20 ha) campus, with extensive sports facilities including a swimming pool, two gymnasiums, two work-out gyms, a 3G pitch (formerly a dry play pitch), a spate dry play pitch, two tennis courts and three multisports halls. It also has multiple specialist teaching blocks and extensive IT equipment.

There is also an off campus boarding house, called Field House which attracts students from around the world.

Ashmount School has been located on Charnwood College's Campus from 2013.

== Community ==
As well as students using the college's facilities, a variety of adult classes take place using the facilities. On site there is a nursery and an all day open day care center for adults with physical disabilities. Some local primary/infant schools and high/secondary schools use the sports coaching and sports facilities offered for lessons and special events.

Other groups which use the college and its facilities regularly are:

- Two local church groups who use facilities on Sundays.
- The Loughborough Junior Dynamo Football Club.
- Multiple martial arts clubs.

== Lipdub ==
Charnwood College is the first school in the United Kingdom to have an official LipDub video to showcase the campus. https://www.youtube.com/watch?v=DGx9Z0-_H1E. There have been over 21,000 views.

== Foundation ==
Charnwood College has been a part of DRET (David Ross Education Trust) since May 2015. The foundation provides extra circular and enrichment opportunities for the students. In 2017, Ofsted made focused inspections of the 13 academies in the Trust including Charnwood College. The review found two 'inadequate' and five 'requires improvement' while six were rated 'good'.
