= Takia (watercraft) =

Fijian boats

Takia are a traditional watercraft of Fiji. They are a type of outrigger canoe that is smaller than a camakau, which in turn is smaller than a drua. A takia hull is a dugout made from any suitable wood. They rarely have sails, and do not feature a centreboard. An oar is used as a rudder.

The takia is open throughout its length like a boat, and the spars to which the cama is secured rest on the gunwale.

— Thomas Williams (1907)
