= Gonzalo Campero =

Argentine sailor

Personal information
- Birth name: Gonzalo José Campero
- Born: 17 May 1960 (age 64); Buenos Aires, Argentina

Gonzalo José Campero (born 17 May 1960) is an Argentine sailor. He competed in the Finn event at the 1988 Summer Olympics.
