= Arif Gürdenlı =

Turkish sailor

Personal information
- Nationality: Turkish
- Born: 7 September 1966 (age 58)

Sport
- Sport: Sailing

Arif Gürdenlı (born 7 September 1966) is a Turkish sailor. He competed in the Finn event at the 1992 Summer Olympics.
