= Henryk Blaszka =

Polish sailor (1958–2024)

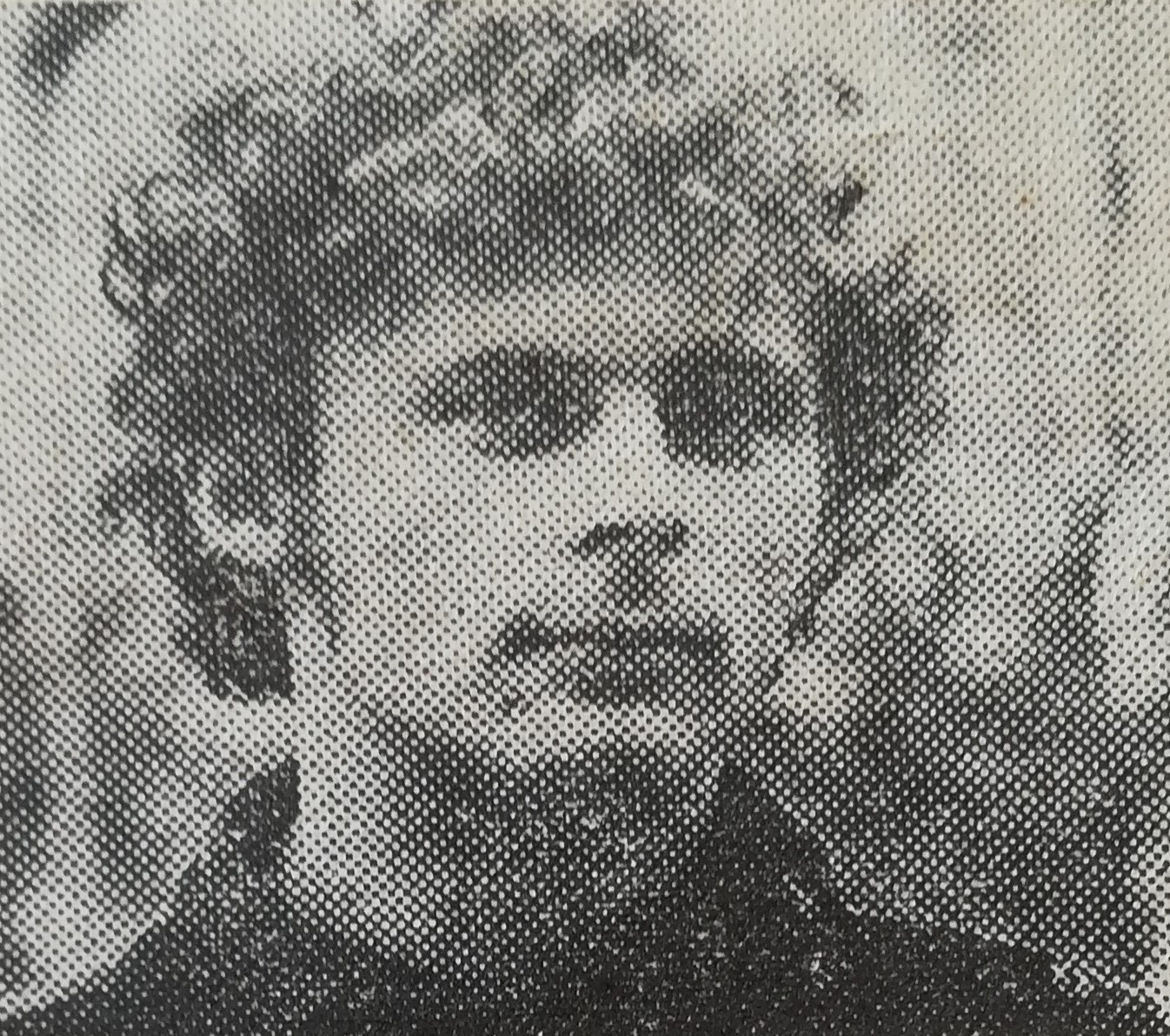
- Blaszka in 1982

Personal information
- Birth name: Henryk Józef Blaszka
- Nationality: Polish
- Born: 25 February 1958; Poznań, Poland
- Died: 21 August 2024 (aged 66)

Henryk Józef Blaszka (25 February 1958 – 21 August 2024) was a Polish sailor. He competed in the Finn event at the 1988 Summer Olympics.

Blaszka died on 21 August 2024, at the age of 66.
