= José María van der Ploeg =

Spanish sailor

José van der Ploeg
Personal information
- Full name: José María van der Ploeg García
- Nationality: Spanish
- Born: 4 May 1958 (age 68)

Sport

Sailing career
- Class(es): Finn, Star
Medal record
Sailing
Representing Spain
Olympic Games
Gold medal – first place	1992 Barcelona	Finn class

José María van der Ploeg García (born 4 May 1958) is a Spanish sailor and Olympic champion. van der Ploeg competed in the 1992 Summer Olympics in Barcelona and won gold medal in the Finn class. van der Ploeg also competed in the Finn class at the 1996 Summer Olympics and in the Star class, together with Rafael Trujillo, at the 2000 Summer Olympics.
