= Thomas Schmid (sailor) =

German sailor

Personal information
- Nationality: German
- Born: 29 March 1959 (age 65); Hamburg, West Germany

Thomas Schmid (born 29 March 1959) is a German sailor. He competed in the Finn event at the 1988 Summer Olympics.
