= Austronesian sail types =

Triangular sail with spars along upper and lower edges used by traditional Austronesians

Austronesian sail types are typically fore-and-aft with spars along one or more edges and include a triangular variant with spars on the upper and lower edges, informally called a crab claw sail. They were first developed by the Austronesian peoples by at least 2000 BCE.

== History ==
The crab claw sail was invented by the Austronesians somewhere in Island Southeast Asia by at least 2000 BCE. It spread with the Austronesian migration to Micronesia, Island Melanesia, Madagascar, and Polynesia. It may have also caused the unique development of outrigger boat technology due to the necessity for stability once crab claw sails were attached to small watercraft. Crab claw sails can be used for double-canoe (catamaran), single-outrigger (on the windward side), or double-outrigger boat configurations, in addition to monohulls.

Crab claw sails are rigged fore-and-aft and can be tilted and rotated relative to the wind. They evolved from "V"-shaped perpendicular square sails (a "double sprit") in which the two spars converge at the base of the hull. The simplest form of the crab claw sail (also with the widest distribution) is composed of a triangular sail supported by two light spars (sometimes erroneously called "sprits") on each side. They were originally mastless, and the entire assembly was taken down when the sails were lowered. There are several distinct types of crab claw rigs, but unlike western rigs, they do not have fixed conventional names.

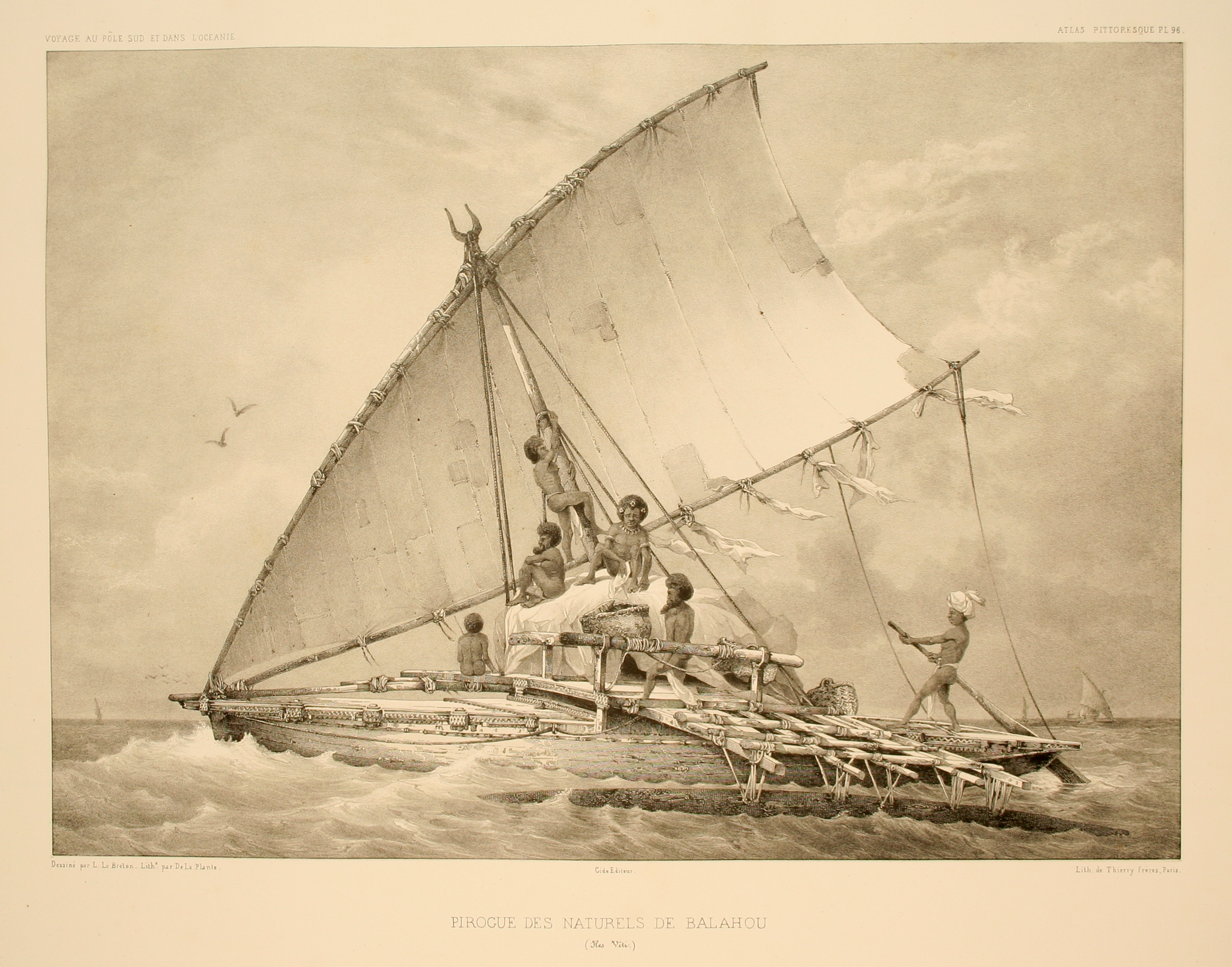
1846 illustration of a Fijian camakau, a single-outrigger canoe with a canted mast "crane sprit"-type crab claw sail

The need to propel larger and more heavily laden boats led to the increase in vertical sail. However this introduced more instability to the vessels. In addition to the unique invention of outriggers to solve this, the sails were also leaned backwards and the converging point moved further forward on the hull. This new configuration required a loose "prop" in the middle of the hull to hold the spars up, as well as rope supports on the windward side. This allowed more sail area (and thus more power) while keeping the center of effort low and thus making the boats more stable. The prop was later converted into fixed or removable canted masts where the spars of the sails were actually suspended by a halyard from the masthead. This type of sail is most refined in Micronesian proas which could reach very high speeds. These configurations are sometimes known as the "crane sprit" or the "crane spritsail". Micronesian, Island Melanesian, and Polynesian single-outrigger vessels also used this canted mast configuration to uniquely develop shunting, where canoes are symmetrical from front to back and change end-to-end when sailing against the wind.

The conversion of the prop to a fixed mast led to the much later invention of the tanja sail (also known variously and misleadingly as the canted square sail, canted rectangular sail, boomed lugsail, or balance lugsail). Tanja sails were rigged similarly to crab claw sails and also had spars on both the head and the foot of the sails; but they were square or rectangular with the spars not converging into a point.

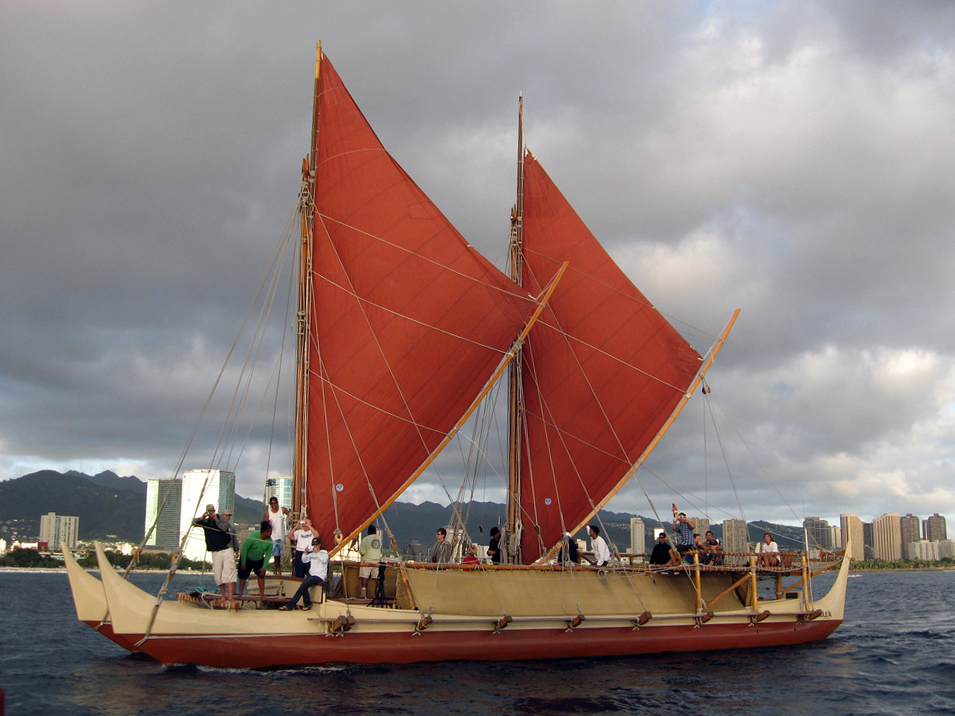
Hokule'a in 2009, with crab claw sails where the upper spars also function as fixed masts

Another evolution of the basic crab claw sail is the conversion of the upper spar into a fixed mast. In Polynesia, this gave the sail more height while also making it narrower, giving it a shape reminiscent of crab pincers (hence "crab claw" sail). This was also usually accompanied by the lower spar becoming more curved.

Austronesians traditionally made their sails from woven mats of the resilient and salt-resistant pandanus leaves. These sails allowed Austronesians to embark on long-distance voyaging. In some cases, however, they were one-way voyages. The failure of pandanus to establish populations in Easter Island and New Zealand is believed to have isolated their settlements from the rest of Polynesia.

Because of the crab claw sail's more ancient origin, there is also a hypothesis that contact between Arabs and Austronesians in their Indian Ocean voyages may have influenced the development of the triangular Arabic lateen sail; and in return Arab square-shaped sails may have influenced the development of the Austronesian rectangular tanja sail of western Southeast Asia. Others, however, believe that the tanja sail was an indigenous invention of Southeast Asian Austronesians, though they also believe that the lateen sail may have been introduced to Arab sailors via contact with Austronesian crab claw sails. A third theory however, concludes that lateen sails were originally Mediterranean and that Portuguese sailors introduced the lateen sail to Asian waters, starting with Vasco da Gama's arrival in India in 1500. This would mean that the development of lateen sails in western sailors would not have been influenced by the crab claw sail.

In western Indonesia, the crab claw sail reappeared as a recent development. Traditionally the people from western Indonesian islands had shifted to the tanja sail, but starting in the 19th century the Madurese people developed the lete sail. "Lete" actually means lateen, but the existence of pekaki (lower spar/boom) indicates that the layar lete is crab claw sail.

Modern wind tunnel studies of sail types show that crab sail performance improves over Bermuda rigs, as the point of sail deviates from close hauled. The configuration has been considered for modern yachts.

== Construction ==
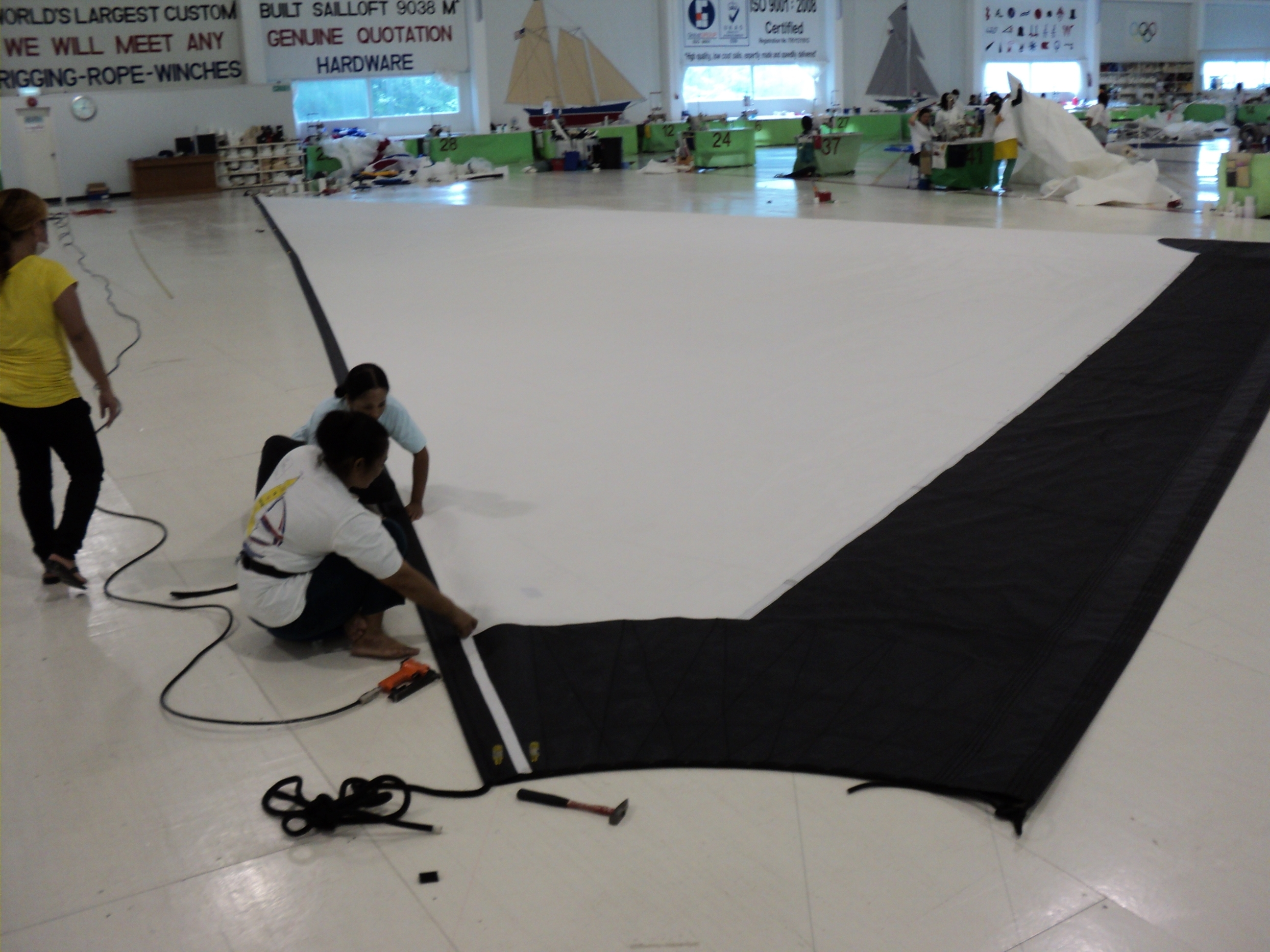
Crab claw sail being constructed for Hot Buoys trimaran. Notice pocket in right hand edge of sail to hold spar. Second spar in this particular configuration is not required since a bolt-rope holds the sail's upper edge and the mast is located in the back of the sailboat. Note lack of shaping.

The crab claw sail consists of a sail, approximately an isosceles triangle in shape. The equal length sides are usually longer than the third side, with spars along the long sides. Austronesian sails typically have spars along two edges of the sail. This is to distribute the loads of sheets and other point loads on the sail. The traditional and historic mat sails used for Austranesian sails has no reinforcement of the sail material along the edges. (Note: Compare the mat sail construction with that used for the canvas sails in Western maritime technology, and with modern sails in synthetic materials – these tend to have bolt ropes and extra layers of canvas) Since mat sails are not as strong as other sail materials, such as canvas, it is important that the spars provide the necessary reinforcement of the edges.

The crab claw may also traditionally be constructed with curved spars, giving the edges of the sail along the spars a convex shape, while the leech of the sail is often quite concave to keep it stiff on the trailing edge. These features give it its distinct, claw-like shape. Modern crab claws generally have straighter spars and a less convex leech, which gives more sail area for a given length of spar. Spars may taper towards the leech. The structure helps the sail to spill gusts.

The crab claw characteristically widens upwards, putting more sail area higher above the ocean, where the wind is stronger and steadier. This increases the heeling moment: the sails tend to blow the watercraft over. For this reason, crab claws are typically used on multihulls, which resist heeling more strongly.

V-shaped square rig from Melanesia, the direct precursor of crab claw sails

"Crane sprit" type crab claw rig of Micronesia with a loose prop

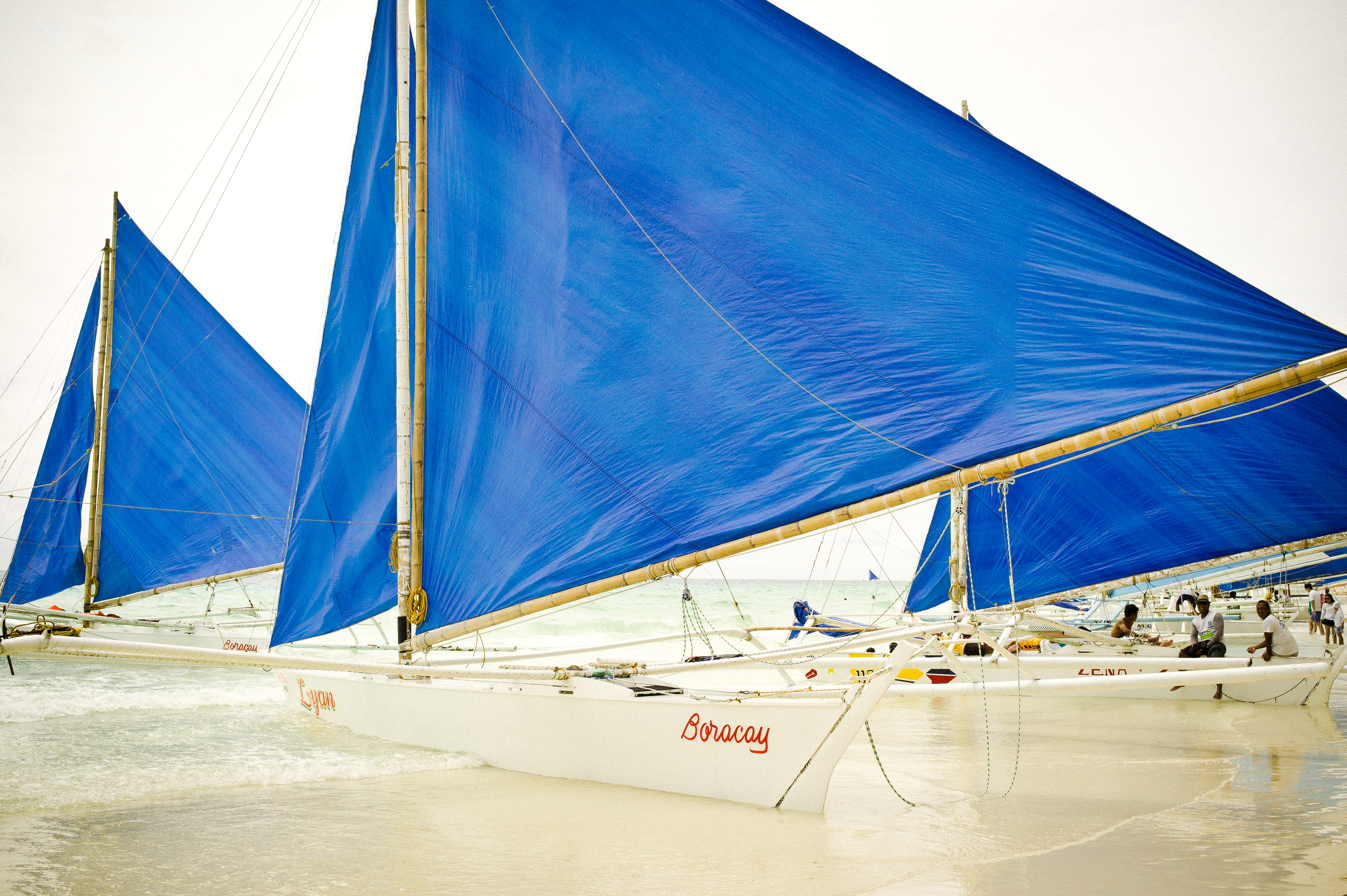
"Crane sprit" type crab claw rig of the Philippines with a fixed mast

Forward-mounted crab claw rig from the Duff Islands

New Guinea-style crab claw rig with vertical sails

Hawaiian crab claw rig amalgamating the upper spar into the fixed mast

Shunting manoevre on a kaep

=== Shunting ===
Due to the construction of the sail, a symmetrical boat with a crab claw does not tack, and instead the sail is shunted. In a shunt, the sail is unfixed from the bow, the other side of it is fixed to the stern, and the mast rake is also reversed. After this conversion, the bow becomes the stern and vice versa. The vessel therefore always has the ama outrigger (and sidestay, if there is one) to windward, and has no bad tack, traveling equally well in both directions.

=== Proa ===
In a proa, the forward intersection of the spars is placed towards the bow. The sail is supported by a short mast attached near the middle of the upper spar, and the forward corner is attached to the hull. The lower spar, or boom, is attached at the forward intersection, but is not attached to the mast. The proa has a permanent windward and leeward side, and exchanges one end for the other when coming about.

To tack, or switch directions across the wind, the forward corner of the sail is loosened and then transferred to the opposite end of the boat, a process called shunting. To shunt, the proa's sheet is let out. The joined corner of the spars is then transferred to the opposite end of the boat. While remaining attached to the top of the mast, the upper spar tilts to vertical and beyond as the forward corner moves past the mast and onward to the other end of the boat. Meanwhile, the mainsheet is detached and used to rotate the rearward end of the boom through a horizontal half circle. The spar join is then re-attached at the new "forward" end of the boat and the mainsheet is re-tightened at the new "rearward" end.

=== Tepukei ===
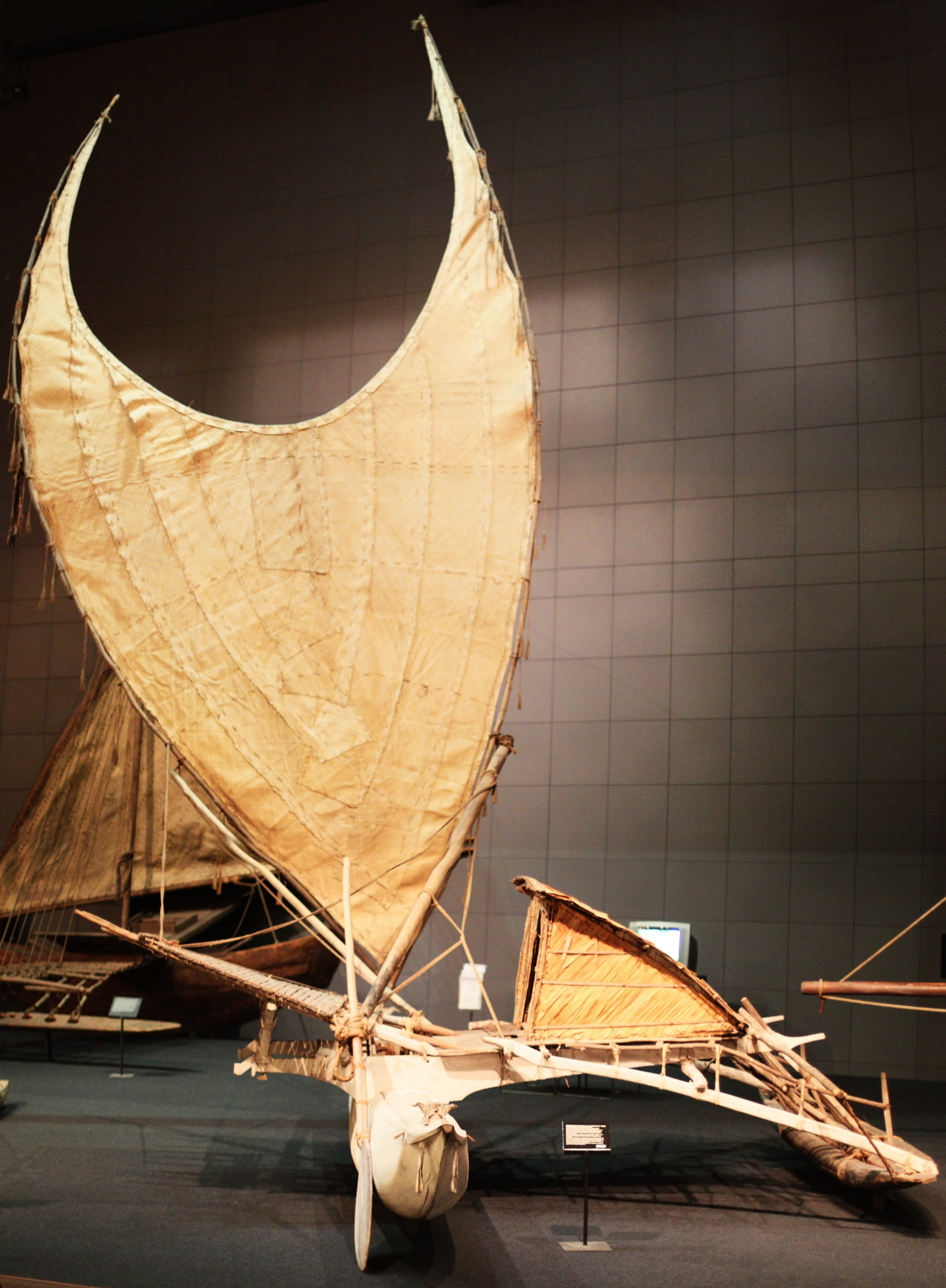
The Maunga Nefe, a te puke or folafolau, was built on Taumako and sailed out of Nifiloli; it was used for travel and trading within the Santa Cruz archipelago.

A shunting rig with the sail propped vertically at the bow, very similar to the proa rig described above.

=== Non-shunting crab claw ===
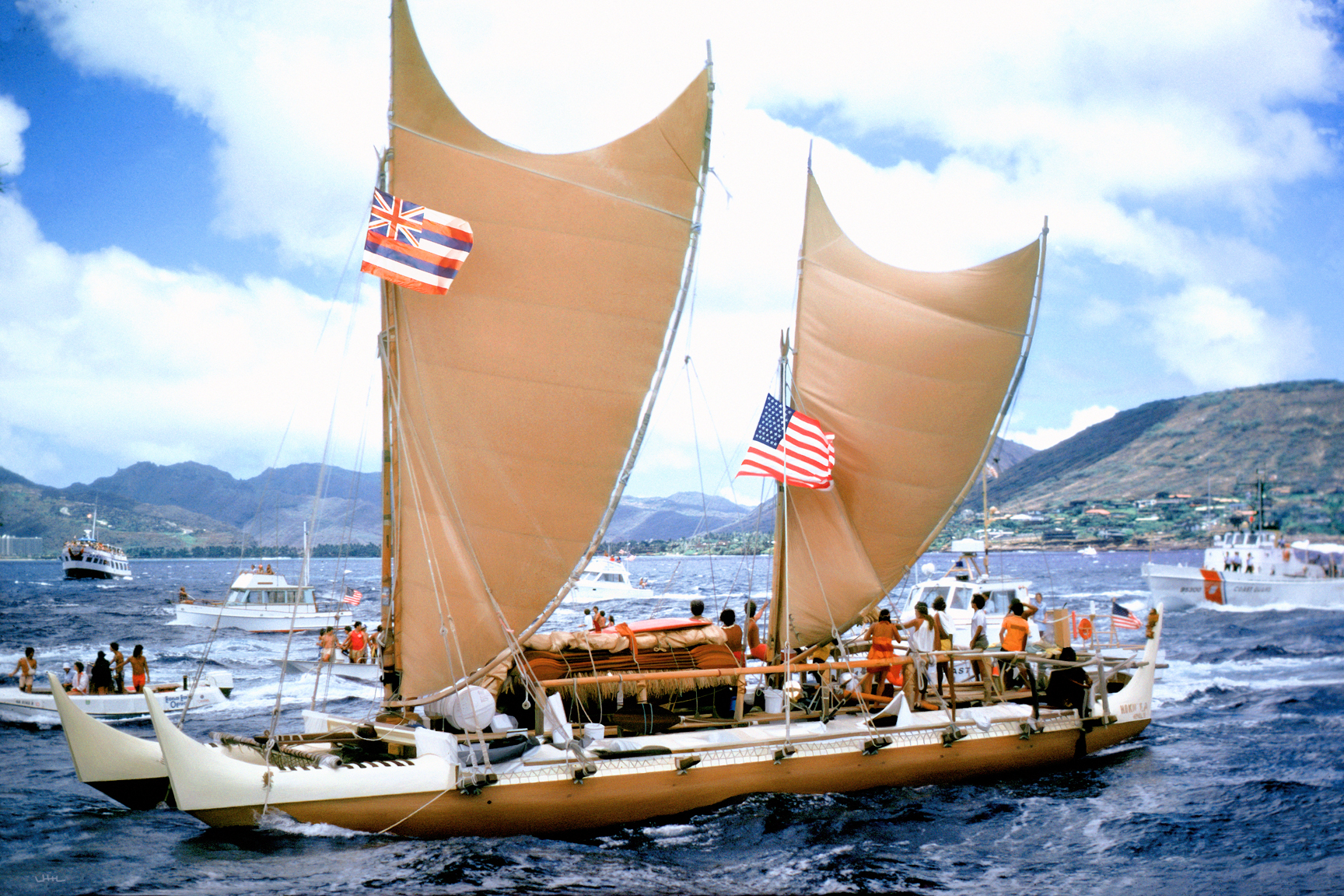
Hokule'a, a bluewater waʻa kaulua, with curved-spar, curved-leech crab claw sails, in 1976

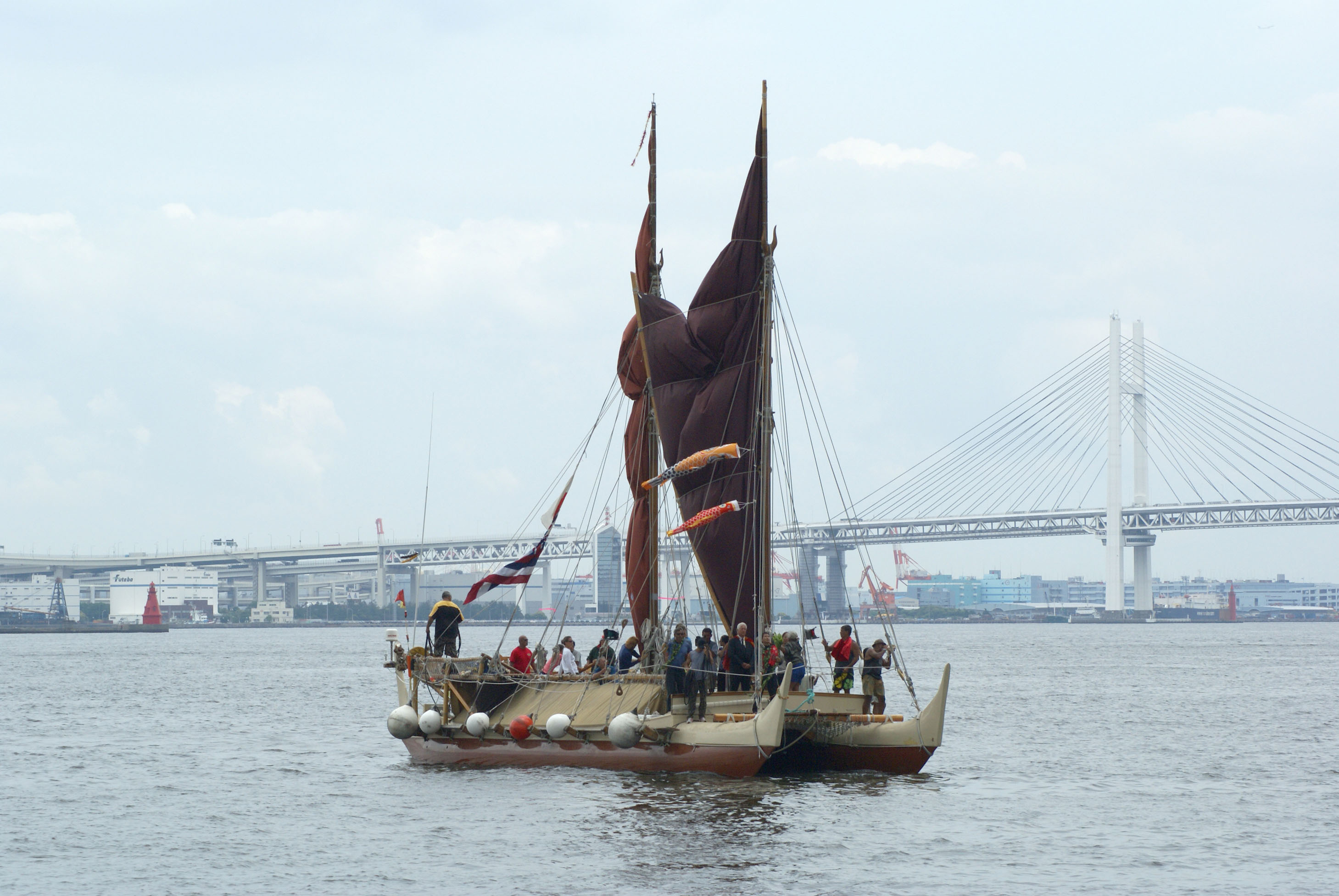
Hokule'a with her kaula pe'a (sail lines) tightened to partly close her crab-claw sails

The term "crab claw sail" is also used for non-shunting sails that widen upwards. The 'ōpe'a, the upper spar, is braced up so high that it is nearly parallel to the mast (as in a gunter rig). The paepae, the lower spar/boom, points well above the horizontal, unlike the boom of most gunter rigs and gaff rigs. The two spars can be brought together or pulled apart with control lines. The mast is fixed and stayed.

== Gallery ==
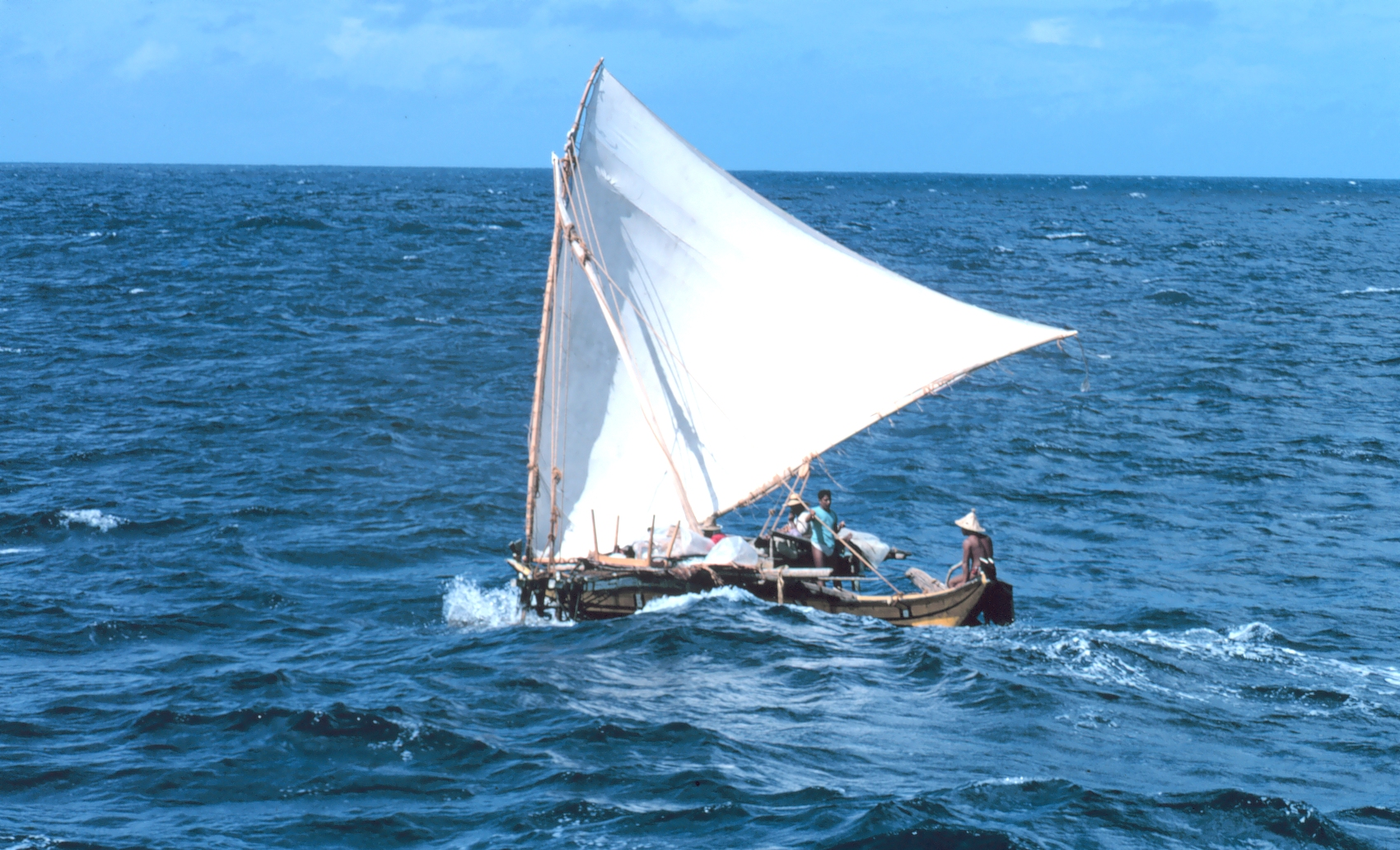
Carolinian wa with crab claw sail

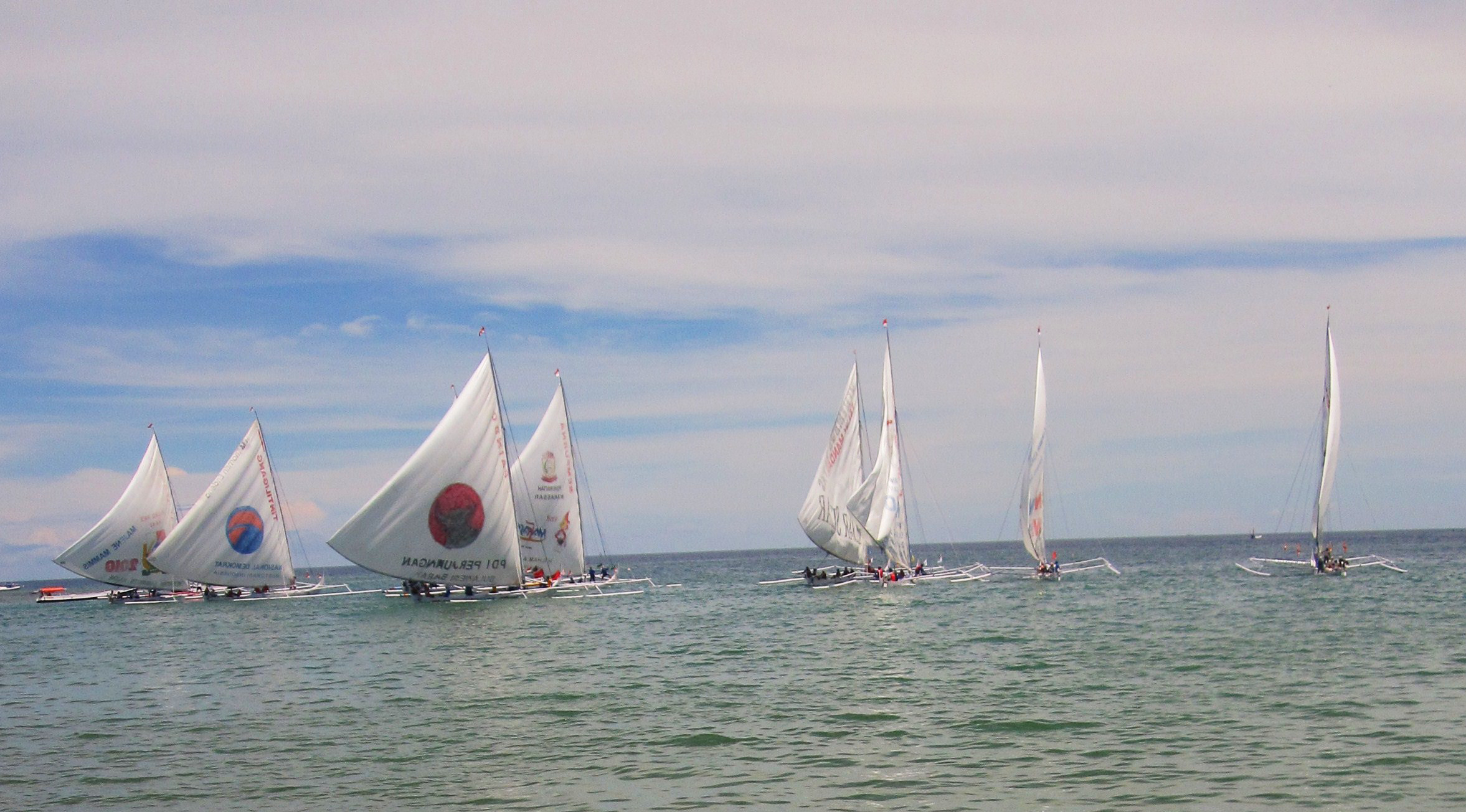
Sandeq boats in Majene, West Sulawesi, Indonesia

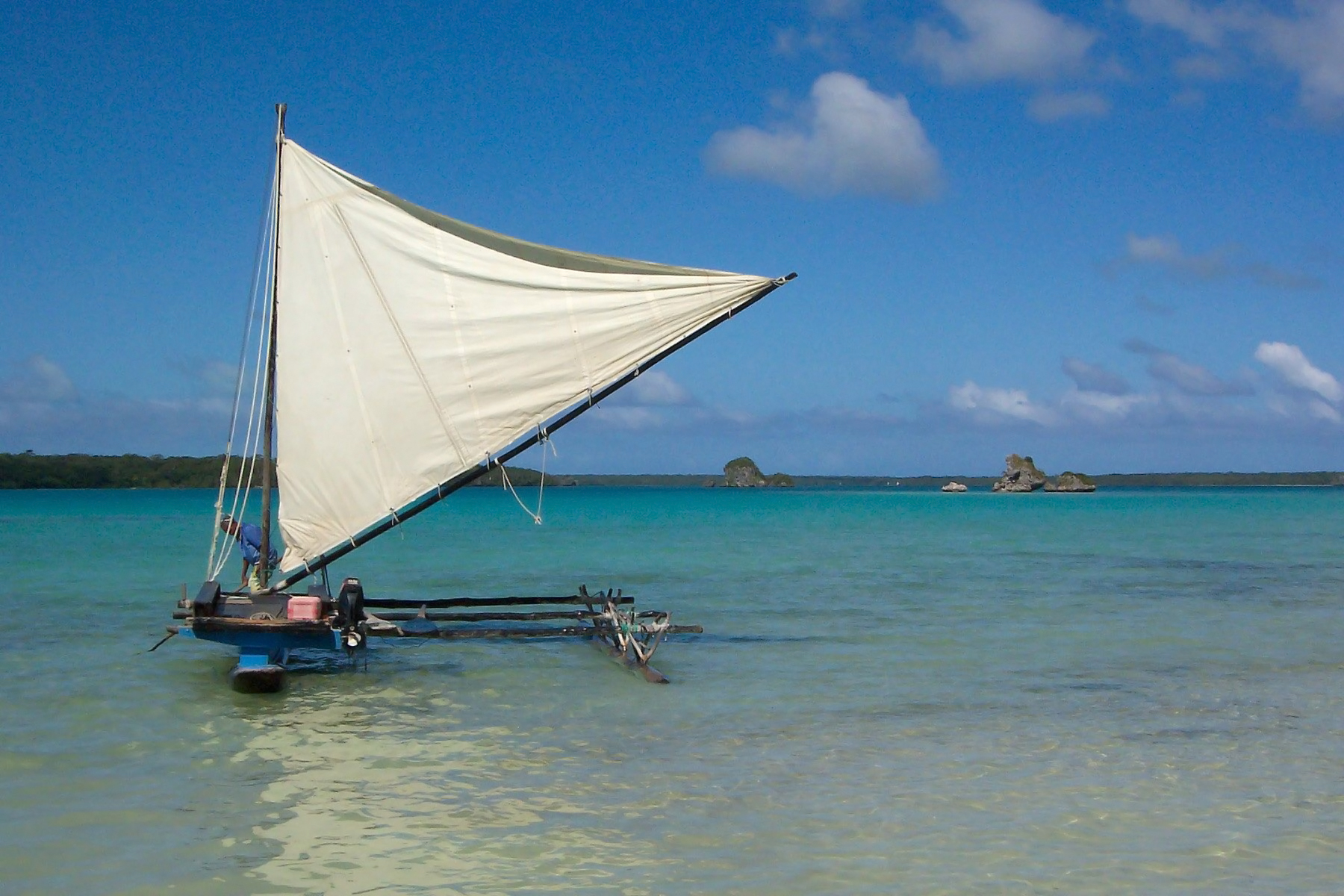
A proa in New Caledonia

Visayan paraw with a "crane sprit" crab claw sail

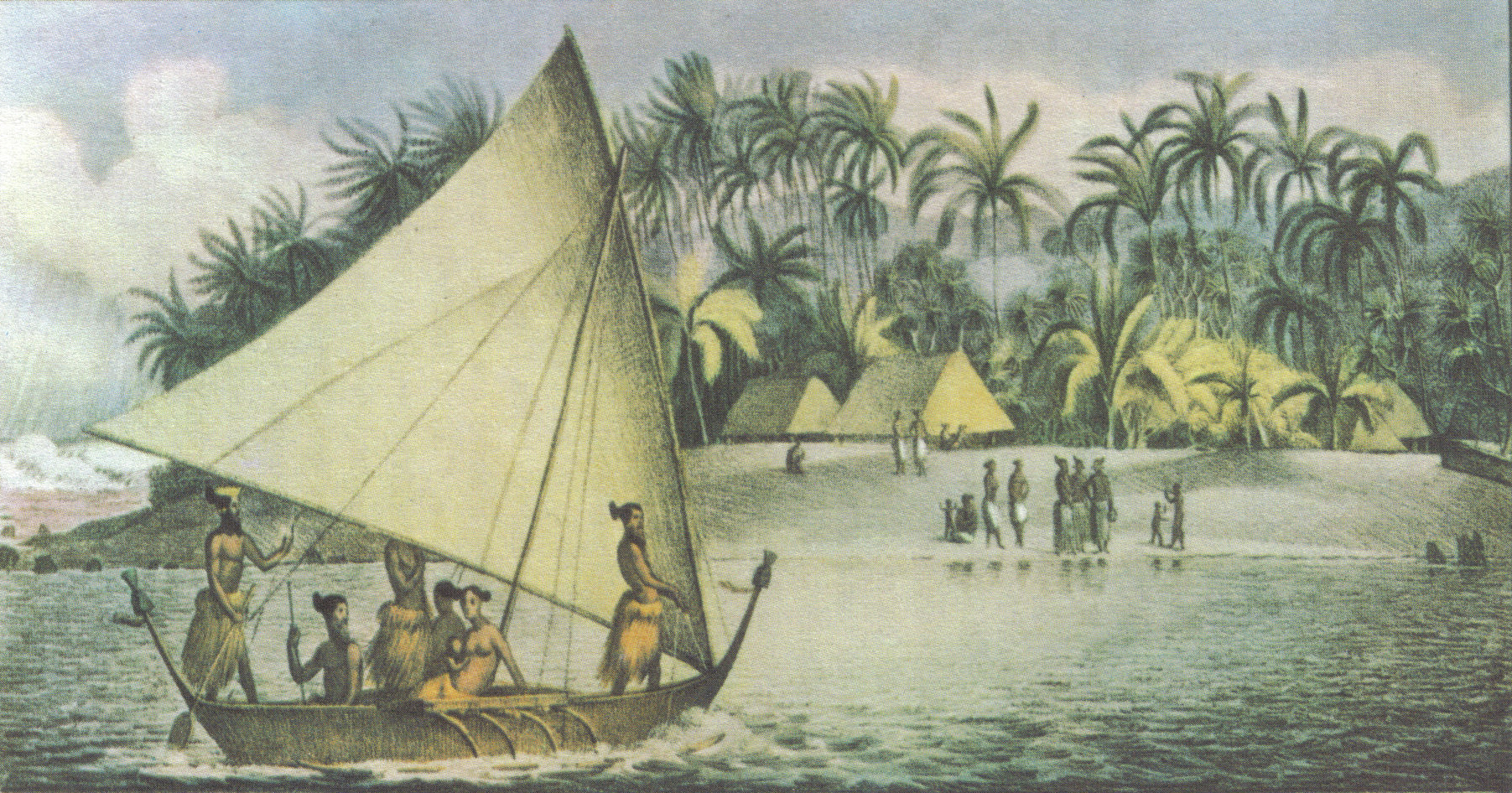
Illustration of a crab claw sail in Tikehau (Louis Choris, 1816)

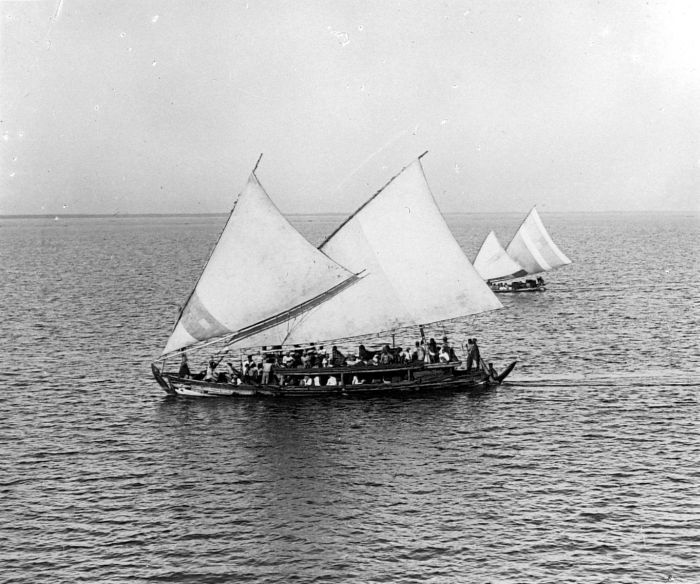
Madurese golekan with crab claw sails

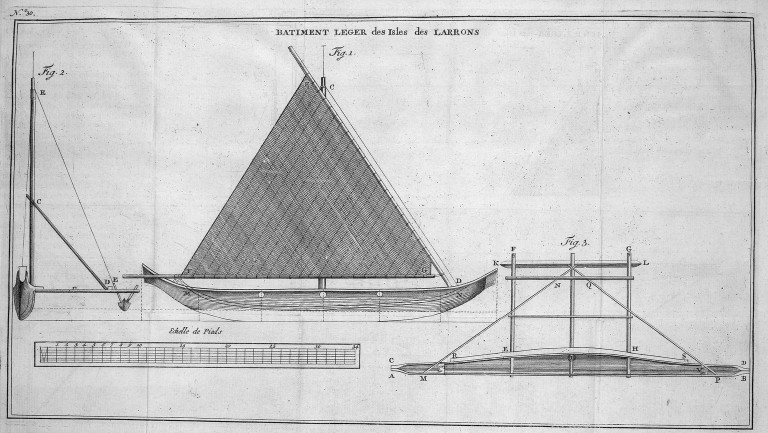
1750 illustration of crab claw sail by George Anson

== See also ==
- Hokule'a
- James Wharram's voyage on Lapita
- Jangada
- Junk rig
- Outrigger canoe
- Proa
- Tanja sail
- Tepukei

=== Related rigs ===
- Gaff rig
- Gunter rig
- Lateen rig, modern crabclaw-like variants
