= Adelchi Pelaschier =

Italian sailor

Personal information
- Nationality: Italian
- Born: 24 October 1921; Monfalcone, Italy
- Died: 28 June 1993 (aged 71); Monfalcone, Italy

Sport
- Sport: Sailing

Adelchi Pelaschier (24 October 1921 – 28 June 1993) was an Italian sailor. He competed at the 1952 Summer Olympics and the 1956 Summer Olympics.
