= Zsombor Berecz (sailor) =

Hungarian sailor (born 1986)

Personal information
- Born: 26 April 1986 (age 40) Budapest, Hungary

Sailing career
- Sport: Sailing
- Classes: Finn; Laser
Medal record
Representing Hungary
Event	1st	2nd	3rd
Olympic Games	0	1	0
World championships	1	0	1
European championships	2	1	1
Total	3	2	2
Sailing
Olympic Games
Silver medal – second place	2020 Tokyo	Finn
World Championships
Gold medal – first place	2018 Aarhus	Finn
Bronze medal – third place	2019 Melbourne	Finn
European Championships
Silver medal – second place	2016 Barcelona	Finn
Bronze medal – third place	2019 Athens	Finn
Gold medal – first place	2020 Gdynia	Finn
Gold medal – first place	2021 Vilamoura	Finn

Zsombor Berecz (born 26 April 1986 in Budapest) is a Hungarian sailor. He competed at the 2020 Summer Olympics in Finn class, winning the silver medal, and in the 2008 and 2012 Summer Olympics in the Men's Laser class, where he finished 29th and 21st respectively.
