= João Neto (sailor) =

Angolan sailor

Personal information
- Nationality: Angolan
- Born: 11 March 1958 (age 67)

Sport
- Sport: Sailing

João Neto (born 11 March 1958) is an Angolan sailor. He competed in the Finn event at the 1992 Summer Olympics.
