= Luca Devoti =

Italian sailor

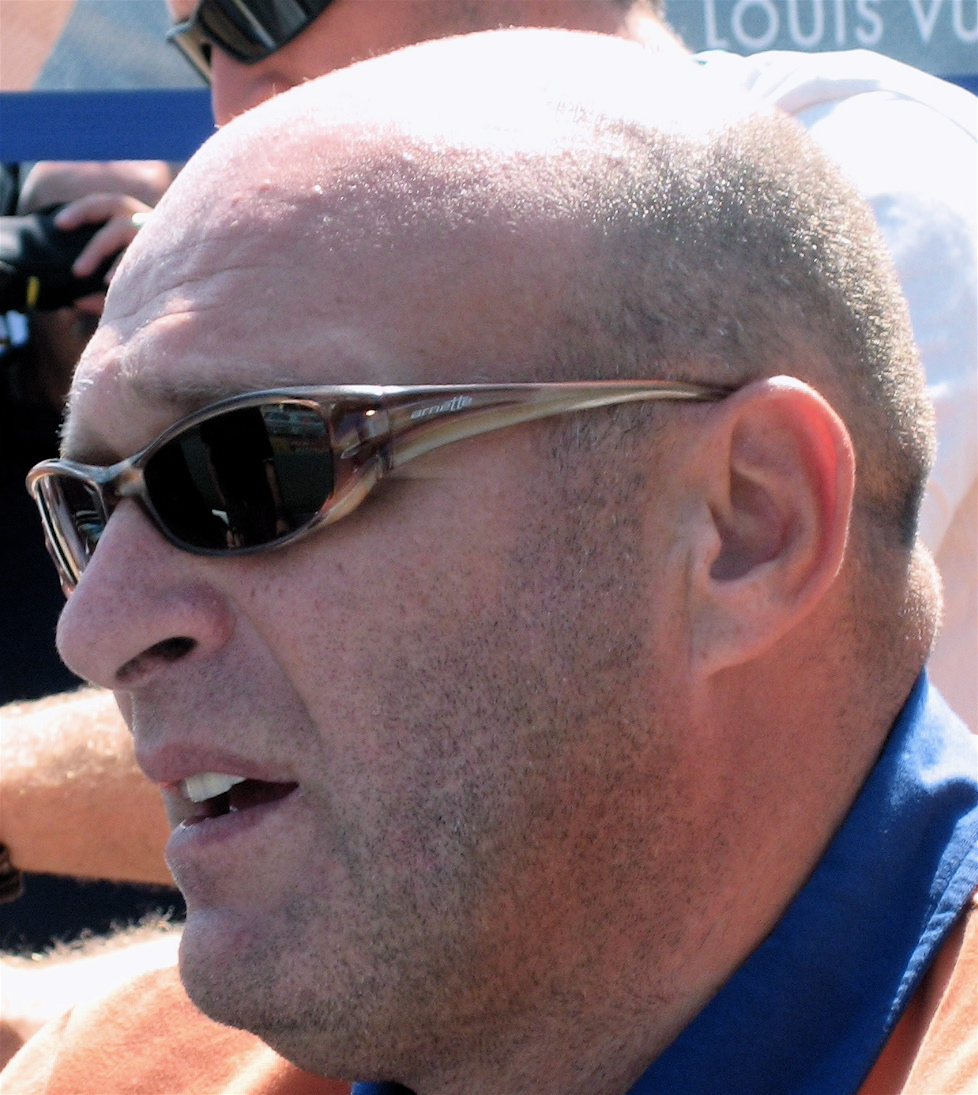
Luca Devoti in 2006.jpg

Matt "Luca" Devoti (born 2 January 1963) is an Italian competitive sailor and Olympic medalist. He won a silver medal in the Finn class at the 2000 Summer Olympics in Sydney.

He is also builder of Devoti Snipes. He was involved with +39 Challenge in the 2007 Louis Vuitton Cup.
