= Othmar Müller von Blumencron =

Swiss sailor

Personal information
- Nationality: Swiss
- Born: 24 December 1964 (age 60)

Sport
- Sport: Sailing

Othmar Müller von Blumencron (born 24 December 1964) is a Swiss sailor.

== Career ==
He competed in the Finn event at the 1992 Summer Olympics.
