= João Neto (futsal player) =

Brazilian futsal player

Personal information
- Full name: João Sabino de Matos Neto
- Date of birth: 27 August 1991 (age 35)
- Place of birth: João Pessoa, Brazil
- Position: Goalkeeper

Team information
- Current team: Jaraguá
- Number: 19

Youth career
- –2010: Benfica FC
- 2010: Botafogo-PB
- 2011: Benfica FC

Senior career*
Years	Team	Apps	(Gls)
2012	João Pessoa		
2012	Treze		
2013–2015	Copagril		
2016–2017	Concórdia	38	(2)
2018–	Jaraguá	14	(1)

International career^{‡}
2018–	Brazil		
- * Club domestic league appearances and goals as of 00:00, 22 May 2019 (UTC) ‡ National team caps and goals as of 00:00, 22 May 2019 (UTC)

João Sabino de Matos Neto (born 27 August 1991) is a Brazilian futsal player who plays as a goalkeeper for Jaraguá and the Brazilian national futsal team.
