= Jürgen Mier =

German sailor

Personal information
- Nationality: German
- Born: 13 May 1941 (age 84); Greifswald, Nazi Germany

Sport
- Sport: Sailing

Jürgen Mier (German pronunciation: [ˈjʏʁɡn̩ ˈmiːɐ̯]; born 13 May 1941) is a German former sailor. He competed in the Finn event at the 1968 Summer Olympics.
