= Paul Sturgess (basketball) =

British basketball player (born 1987)

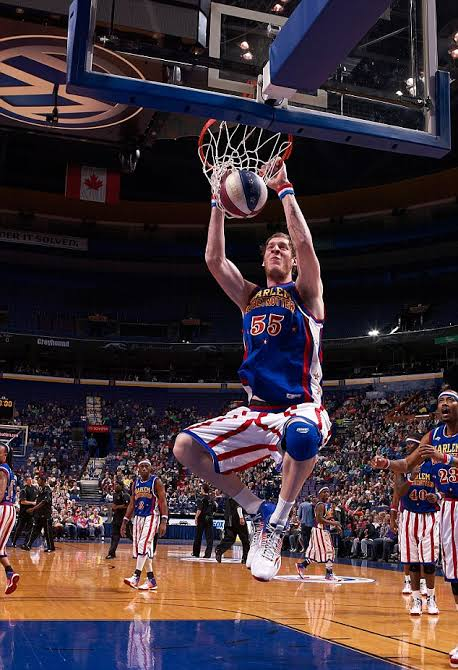
- Sturgess with the Harlem Globetrotters in 2014

Personal information
- Born: 25 November 1987 (age 38) Loughborough, England
- Listed height: 7 ft 7.26 in (2.32 m)
- Listed weight: 325 lb (147 kg)

Career information
- High school: Burleigh Community College
- College: Florida Tech; Mountain State
- NBA draft: 2011: undrafted
- Playing career: 2011–2015
- Position: Center

Career history
- 2011–2013: Harlem Globetrotters
- 2013–2014: Texas Legends
- 2014–2015: Cheshire Phoenix

Paul Sturgess (born 25 November 1987) is an English former professional basketball player. At a height of 7 ft 7.26 in (2.32 m), he was measured as the tallest living person from the United Kingdom by Guinness World Records in November 2011. He was also the tallest college basketball player in the United States.

== Career ==
Sturgess was "drafted" by the Harlem Globetrotters in August 2011 and is the tallest ever to play for the team, earning him the nickname "Tiny". He joined the team with fellow rookie Jonte "Too Tall" Hall, who, at 5 ft 2 in (1.57 m) was 2.5 ft (76 cm) shorter than Sturgess and was the shortest Globetrotters player ever at that time.

Sturgess wears a size 19 shoe. He was the second-tallest man in the UK until the death of actor and fellow basketball player Neil Fingleton, who was 7 ft 7.56 in (2.33 m) tall, in 2017. Examinations as a teenager revealed that his growth is healthy rather than the result of a medical condition, and that his height is genetic. His biological father is 6 ft 10 in (2.08 m) and there are other tall members in his family, although his mother is 5 ft 5 in (1.65 m) and his younger sister is 5 ft 6 in (1.68 m). He featured prominently in the 2007 ITV1 documentary Supersize Kids: Britain's Tallest Teens when he was 19 and playing at the Florida Institute of Technology.

Sturgess enjoys playing many other sports and, before concentrating on basketball, played golf and football. Sturgess's height was average to slightly above average growing up and he didn't stand out. He was 5 ft 6 in (1.68 m) aged 14 when he started playing team basketball, but soon after a rapid growth spurt in the next two years took him to 7 ft (2.1 m) aged 16 playing at Burleigh Community College, and 7 ft 2 in (2.18 m) when he graduated from high school at age 18. A growth spurt during the ages of 16 and 17 resulted in a 1 ft (30 cm) of height added within a single year. Sturgess can hold the 10 ft (3.0 m) high rim whilst standing. He declined offers to play professional basketball in Europe, preferring to pursue basketball in the US.

On 1 November 2013, Sturgess was selected by the Springfield Armor in the third round of the 2013 NBA Development League Draft. On 4 November 2013, he was traded to the Texas Legends where he played for the rest of the season. On 19 November 2014, he was signed by the Cheshire Phoenix of the British Basketball League. He later transferred back to the Harlem Globetrotters, this time being part of the arranged opposition. In the re-formed Washington Generals, he adopted a mask as the villainous alter ego "Cager".

Following the end of his basketball career in 2015, Sturgess became a motivational speaker, mostly for children of primary school age.
