= Jürgen Vogler =

German sailor

Personal information
- Nationality: German
- Born: 13 December 1925 Berlin, Germany

Sport
- Sport: Sailing

Jürgen Vogler (German pronunciation: [ˈjʏʁɡn̩ ˈfoːɡlɐ], born 13 December 1925) was a German sailor. He competed in the Finn event at the 1956 Summer Olympics.
