= Uto Ni Yalo Trust =

Fijian traditional voyaging organisation

- Heart of the Spirit
- Founded: 2009
- Location: Suva, Fiji
- Website: www.utoniyalo.org

The Uto Ni Yalo Trust is a Fijian non-profit organisation established in 2009 to revive traditional Pacific voyaging, canoe building, and celestial navigation. Its name derives from the Fijian words meaning "Heart of the Spirit." The Trust was co-founded by a group of Fijian ocean advocates and community leaders.

== Vessel ==
The Trust's vessel, also named Uto Ni Yalo, is a 72-foot double-hulled sailing canoe (vaka) built in 2010. It is powered by wind and solar energy, with a twin solar-powered propulsion system. The vessel is one of nine traditionally designed sailing canoes originally supported by the Okeanos Foundation for the Sea, a German philanthropic conservation group. Since its launch it has sailed over 80,000 nautical miles to more than 15 countries across the Pacific and beyond.

== Mission ==
The Trust aims to preserve traditional seafaring knowledge, promote ocean stewardship, and demonstrate that low-carbon sea transport is a viable alternative for remote island communities in Fiji. In addition to its cultural mission, the vessel has provided practical community services, including delivering relief supplies to islands affected by tropical cyclones. In 2017, the Trust facilitated the collection and safe disposal of more than 2,000 kilograms of marine waste during island visits.

== Governance ==
The Trust is governed entirely by volunteers and has over 120 Pacific island families as members. It has received support from the UNDP Global Environment Facility Small Grants Programme.
