= Christian Schröder =

German sailor

Personal information
- Full name: Jan-Christian Schröder
- Nationality: German
- Born: 10 January 1947 (age 78); Schwerin, Germany

Sport
- Sport: Sailing

Christian Schröder (born 10 January 1947) is a German sailor. He competed in the Finn event at the 1972 Summer Olympics.
