= Gary Griffin (sailor) =

Guamanian sailor

Gary Griffin (born March 20, 1953, in Guam) is a Guamanian-born sailor who has competed at the 1988 Summer Olympics in Seoul, South Korea. He finished at the Dinghy racing in his 32nd place. Griffin was an oldest participant at age of 35 at the 1988 Summer Olympics.
