= Stuart Childerley =

British sailor

Personal information
- Nationality: British
- Born: Stuart Michael Childerley; 17 February 1966 (age 60) Lowestoft, England

Sailing career
- Sport: Sailing

Stuart Michael Childerley (born 17 February 1966) is a British sailor. He competed in the 1988 and 1992 Summer Olympics.

== Early life ==
In the 1980s he lived on Loweswater Drive in Loughborough. He attended Burleigh Community College, and trained at Staunton Harold Reservoir.

== Career ==
He is now an International Race Officer.

== Personal life ==
He had moved to Southampton by 1988. By the early 1990s he had moved to South Clifton.
