= Hong Kong at the 1964 Summer Olympics =

- IOC code: HKG (HOK used at these Games)
- NOC: Sports Federation and Olympic Committee of Hong Kong

in Tokyo
- Competitors: 39 in 7 sports
- Flag bearer: none
- Medals: Gold 0 Silver 0 Bronze 0 Total 0

Summer Olympics appearances (overview)
- 1952; 1956; 1960; 1964; 1968; 1972; 1976; 1980; 1984; 1988; 1992; 1996; 2000; 2004; 2008; 2012; 2016; 2020; 2024

Hong Kong competed at the 1964 Summer Olympics in Tokyo, Japan. 39 competitors, 38 men and 1 woman, took part in 24 events in 7 sports.

== Athletics ==
- Chu Ming – long jump and triple jump
- Patrick Field – 800 metres and 1500 metres
- William Hill – 200 metres and 400 metres
- So Kam Tong – 50 kilometres walk

== Boxing ==
- Law Hon Pak (羅漢北)- Men's Bantamweight (51–54 kg)
- Lee Kam Wah – Men's Flyweight (<51 kg)

== Cycling ==
Four cyclists represented Hong Kong in 1964.

Individual road race

- Chow Kwong Man
- Chow Kwong Choi
- Mok Sau Hei

Team time trial

- Chow Kwong Choi
- Chow Kwong Man
- Mok Sau Hei
- Michael Watson

Individual pursuit

- Chow Kwong Choi

== Hockey ==
- Daniel Castro – Hockey
- Joaquim Collaquo – Hockey
- Rui da Silva – Hockey
- Omar Dallah – Hockey
- José da Cunha – Hockey
- Packey Gardner – Hockey
- Lionel Guterres – Hockey
- Slawee Kadir – Hockey
- Farid Khan – Hockey
- Frederic McGosh – Hockey
- John Monteiro – Hockey
- Kader Rahman – Hockey
- João Silva – Hockey
- Harnam Singh Grewal – Hockey
- Dillon Singh Sarinder – Hockey
- Kuldip Singh – Hockey
- Hussain Zia – Hockey

== Sailing ==
- Paul Cooper (England) – Sailing
- John Park (Tianjin, China) – Men's Dragon
- Alan Stevens – Men's Finn
- William Turnbull (1933 England-?) – Sailing

== Shooting ==
Five shooters represented Hong Kong in 1964.

50 m pistol

- William Gillies
- Hoo Kam Chiu

300 m rifle, three positions

- Reginald Dos Remedios

50 m rifle, three positions

- Peter Rull, Sr.
- Reginald Dos Remedios

50 m rifle, prone

- Henry Souza
- Peter Rull, Sr.

== Swimming ==
Men

Athlete	Event	Heat		Semifinal		Final	
Athlete	Event	Time	Rank	Time	Rank	Time	Rank
Robert Loh	100 m freestyle	1:00.4	61	Did not advance			
Robert Loh	400 m freestyle	4:53.3	46	—N/a		Did not advance	
Robert Loh	1500 m freestyle	19:28.6	31	—N/a		Did not advance	
Chan Kam Hong	200 m backstroke	2:46.0	34	Did not advance			

Women

Athlete	Event	Heat		Final	
Athlete	Event	Time	Rank	Time	Rank
Li Hin Yu	200 m breaststroke	3:22.2	26	Did not advance	
