= Hong Kong at the 2028 Summer Olympics =

- IOC code: HKG
- NOC: Sports Federation and Olympic Committee of Hong Kong, China
- Website: www.hkolympic.org (in Chinese and English)

in Los Angeles, United States 14 July 2028 – 30 July 2028
- Competitors: 1 in 1 sport
- Medals: Gold 0 Silver 0 Bronze 0 Total 0

Summer Olympics appearances (overview)
- 1952; 1956; 1960; 1964; 1968; 1972; 1976; 1980; 1984; 1988; 1992; 1996; 2000; 2004; 2008; 2012; 2016; 2020; 2024; 2028

Hong Kong, competing as "Hong Kong, China" competed at the 2028 Summer Olympics in Los Angeles from 14 to 30 July 2028. It was the territory's 19th appearance at the Summer Olympics since its debut as a British colony in 1952, except Moscow 1980 as part of US led boycott, and the seventh appearance at the Summer Olympics since the sovereignty of Hong Kong was returned to the People's Republic of China (PRC) in 1997.

== Competitors ==
The following is the list of number of competitors in the Games.

Sport	Men	Women	Total
Tennis	1	0	0
Total	1	0	1

== Tennis ==
Hong Kong entered 1 tennis players into the Olympic tournament. Coleman Wong secured an outright berth by winning the men's singles titles at the 2026 Asian Games in Aichi Prefecture and Nagoya, Japan.
