= Hong Kong at the 1976 Summer Olympics =

- IOC code: HKG
- NOC: Sports Federation and Olympic Committee of Hong Kong

in Montreal
- Competitors: 25 in 6 sports
- Flag bearer: none
- Medals: Gold 0 Silver 0 Bronze 0 Total 0

Summer Olympics appearances (overview)
- 1952; 1956; 1960; 1964; 1968; 1972; 1976; 1980; 1984; 1988; 1992; 1996; 2000; 2004; 2008; 2012; 2016; 2020; 2024

Hong Kong competed at the 1976 Summer Olympics in Montreal, Quebec, Canada. 25 competitors, 23 men and 2 women, took part in 27 events in 6 sports.

== Canoeing ==
- Hui Cheong Canoeing
- John Wai Canoeing
- Kwan Honk Wai Canoeing
- Mak Chi Wai Canoeing
- Ng Hin Wan Canoeing
- Ng Tsuen Man Canoeing

== Cycling ==
Four cyclists represented Hong Kong in 1976.

Individual road race

- Kwong Chi Yan – did not finish (→ no ranking)
- Chan Fai Lui – did not finish (→ no ranking)
- Tang Kam Man – did not finish (→ no ranking)
- Chan Lam Hams – did not finish (→ no ranking)

Team time trial

- Chan Fai Lui
- Chan Lam Hams
- Kwong Chi Yan
- Tang Kam Man

1000m time trial

- Chan Fai Lui – 1:16.957 (→ 28th place)

Individual pursuit

- Tang Kam Man – 24th place

== Fencing ==
Four fencers, all men, represented Hong Kong in 1976.

Men's foil

- Ng Wing Biu
- Kam Wai Leung
- Chan Matthew

Men's team foil

- Chan Matthew, Denis Cunningham, Kam Wai Leung, Ng Wing Biu

Men's épée

- Kam Wai Leung
- Denis Cunningham
- Chan Matthew

Men's team épée

- Chan Matthew, Denis Cunningham, Kam Wai Leung, Ng Wing Biu

Men's sabre

- Kam Wai Leung

== Judo ==
- Mok Cheuk Wing Judo

== Shooting ==
- Tso Hin Yip Shooting
- Reginald Dos Remedios Shooting
- Chow Tsun Man Shooting
- Peter Rull Sr. (Estonia) Shooting
- Camilo Pedro Shooting
- Solomon Lee Kui Nang Shooting

== Swimming ==
- Karen Robertson Swimming
- Raphaelynne Lee Swimming
- Mark Anthony Crocker Swimming
- Lawrence Kwoh Swimming
