= Hong Kong at the 1968 Summer Olympics =

- IOC code: HKG (HOK used at these Games)
- NOC: Sports Federation and Olympic Committee of Hong Kong

in Mexico City
- Competitors: 11 in 3 sports
- Medals: Gold 0 Silver 0 Bronze 0 Total 0

Summer Olympics appearances (overview)
- 1952; 1956; 1960; 1964; 1968; 1972; 1976; 1980; 1984; 1988; 1992; 1996; 2000; 2004; 2008; 2012; 2016; 2020; 2024; 2028

Hong Kong competed at the 1968 Summer Olympics in Mexico City, Mexico. Eleven competitors, all men, took part in twelve events in three sports.

== Sailing ==
Open

Athlete	Event	Race							Net points	Final rank
Athlete	Event	1	2	3	4	5	6	7	Net points	Final rank
Neil Pryde; Peter Gamble	Flying Dutchman	11	13	15	8	~~21~~	16	9	108	14
John Park; Paul Cooper; William Turnbull	Dragon	20	12	20	15	13	~~22~~	19	135	19

== Shooting ==
Three shooters represented Hong Kong in 1968.

Open

Athlete	Event	Final	
Athlete	Event	Score	Rank
Young Kwok Wai	25 m rapid fire pistol	517	56
José Lei	Men's 50 metre rifle three positions	1112	49
José Lei	Men's 50 metre rifle prone	580	77
Peter Rull, Sr.	Men's 50 metre rifle prone	582	71

== Swimming ==
Men

Athlete	Event	Heat		Semifinal		Final	
Athlete	Event	Time	Rank	Time	Rank	Time	Rank
Andrew Loh	100 metre freestyle	1:00.7	59	Did not advance			
Andrew Loh	200 metre freestyle	2:15.8	42	Did not advance			
Andrew Loh	400 metre freestyle	5:03.6	34	Did not advance			
Andrew Loh	100 metre butterfly	1:06.5	45	Did not advance			
Andrew Loh	200 metre medley	2:42.0	44	Did not advance			
Robert Loh	100 metre freestyle	1:01.1	60	Did not advance			
Robert Loh	200 metre freestyle	2:16.2	43	Did not advance			
Robert Loh	400 metre freestyle	5:10.1	37	Did not advance			
Robert Loh	100 metre butterfly	1:06.5	44	Did not advance			
Robert Loh	200 metre medley	2:39.3	41	Did not advance			
Wong Man Chiu "Ronnie"	100 metre freestyle	58.0	46	Did not advance			
Wong Man Chiu "Ronnie"	200 metre freestyle	2:15.0	41	Did not advance			
Wong Man Chiu "Ronnie"	400 metre freestyle	5:05.7	35	Did not advance			
Wong Man Chiu "Ronnie"	100 metre backstroke	1:11.3	33	Did not advance			
Wong Man Chiu "Ronnie"	200 metre backstroke	2:38.6	29	Did not advance			
Wong Man Chiu "Ronnie"	200 metre medley	2:36.1	39	Did not advance			
