= Hong Kong at the 1960 Summer Olympics =

- IOC code: HKG (HOK used at these Games)
- NOC: Sports Federation and Olympic Committee of Hong Kong

in Rome
- Competitors: 4 in 2 sports
- Flag bearer: none
- Officials: ?
- Medals: Gold 0 Silver 0 Bronze 0 Total 0

Summer Olympics appearances (overview)
- 1952; 1956; 1960; 1964; 1968; 1972; 1976; 1980; 1984; 1988; 1992; 1996; 2000; 2004; 2008; 2012; 2016; 2020; 2024; 2028

Hong Kong competed at the 1960 Summer Olympics in Rome, Italy. Four competitors, all men, took part in three events in two sports.

== Shooting ==
Three shooters represented Hong Kong in 1960.

Men's 50 m pistol

- William Gillies

Men's 50 m rifle, prone

- Peter Rull, Sr.
- Henry Souza

== Swimming ==
Men

Athlete	Event	Heat		Semifinal		Final	
Athlete	Event	Time	Rank	Time	Rank	Time	Rank
Cheung Kin Man	100 m freestyle	1:01.1	43	Did not advance			
