= Hong Kong at the 1956 Summer Olympics =

- IOC code: HKG
- NOC: Sports Federation and Olympic Committee of Hong Kong

in Melbourne/Stockholm
- Competitors: 2 in 1 sport
- Officials: led by Arnaldo de Oliveira Sales
- Medals: Gold 0 Silver 0 Bronze 0 Total 0

Summer Olympics appearances (overview)
- 1952; 1956; 1960; 1964; 1968; 1972; 1976; 1980; 1984; 1988; 1992; 1996; 2000; 2004; 2008; 2012; 2016; 2020; 2024; 2028

Hong Kong, a British colony at the time, competed at the 1956 Summer Olympics in Melbourne, Australia, from 22 November to 8 December 1956. This was Hong Kong's second appearance in an Olympic Games. Two athletes, both men, participated in the swimming event. Hong Kong did not win a medal in Melbourne Olympics. The best result was Cheung Kin Man, who came 22nd in Men's 100 m freestyle.

== Background ==
The National Olympic Committee (NOC) for Hong Kong was founded in 1950 as the Amateur Sports Federation and Olympic Committee of Hong Kong, and was renamed in 1999 to the Sports Federation and Olympic Committee of Hong Kong, China (SF&OC). It was recognized by the International Olympic Committee (IOC) in 1951, and subsequently, Hong Kong began to be represented separately from Great Britain. Hong Kong made its Olympics Games debut in 1952 at Helsinki. 1956 Melbourne Olympics was Hong Kong's 2nd appearance at an Olympic Games. The delegation in 1956 consists of two swimmers, Cheung Kin Man and Wan Shiu Ming. The delegation was led by Arnaldo de Oliveira Sales, president of Amateur Sports Federation and Olympic Committee of Hong Kong at the time.

Cheung Kin Man was 24 years old at the time of Melbourne Olympics. He had previously represented Hong Kong at the 1952 Summer Olympics in Helsinki, and would represent Hong Kong again at the 1960 Summer Olympics in Rome. In 1964, Tokyo Olympics torch relay, Cheung, would be the torch bearer for the last leg. Wan Shiu Ming was 18 years old at the time of Melbourne Olympics. This was his only appearance in Olympic Games. Wan would later win the Cross Harbour Race six times, winning the nickname of 'Flying Fish of Victoria Peak' (太平山飛魚).

== Competitors ==
The following is the list of the number of competitors in the Games.

Sport	Men	Women	Total
Swimming	2	0	2
Total	2	0	2

== Swimming ==
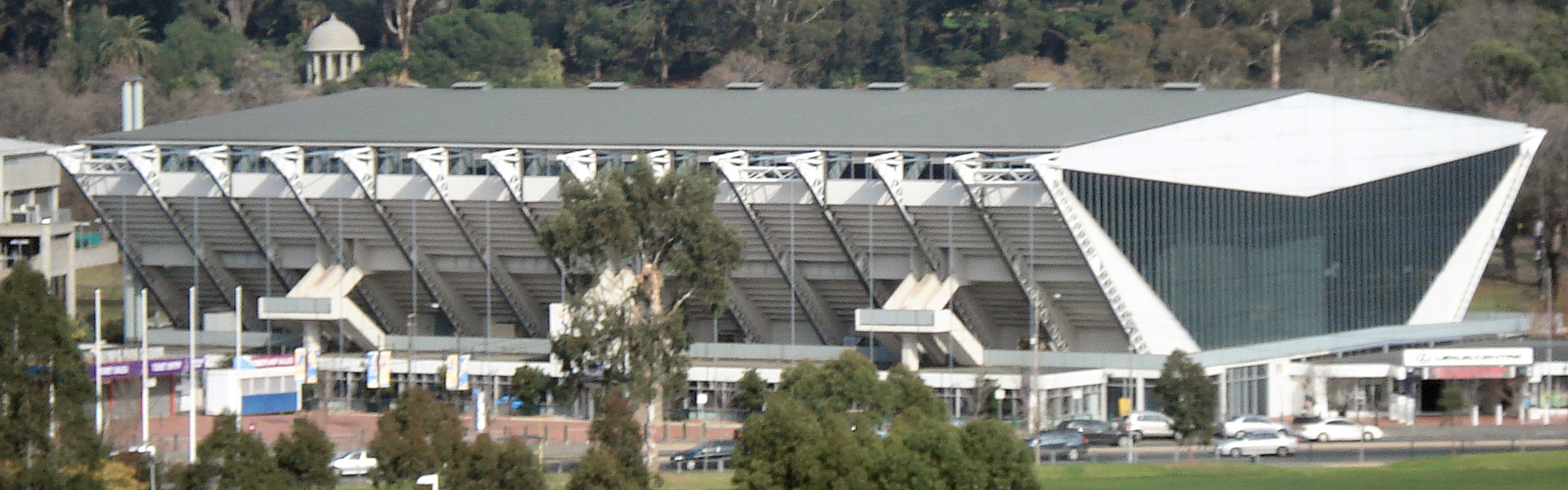
Swimming and Diving Stadium, the venue of the swimming events. Now known commercially as the AIA Vitality Centre.

On 29 November, both Cheung Kin Man and Wan Shiu Ming participated in the men's 100 m freestyle. Cheung was assigned to heat two. He finished in 59.8 seconds, ranked 4th in the heat and 22nd overall, tied with Hans Köhler from Germany. Wan was assigned to heat five. He finished in 1:00.7, ranked 7th and the last in the heat and 32nd overall, tied with André Laurent from Belgium. Only the fastest 16 advanced to the semi-finals, and hence both Cheung and Wan were eliminated. The gold medal was won by Jon Henricks, silver by John Devitt and bronze by Gary Chapman, all from Australia. On 1 December, Wan participated in the men's 400 m freestyle. He was assigned to heat one. He finished in 5:02.6, ranked 7th and the last in the heat and 32nd overall. Only the fastest 8 advanced to the final, so Wan was eliminated. The gold medal was won by Murray Rose from Australia, silver by Tsuyoshi Yamanaka from Japan and bronze by George Breen from the US. On 4 December, Cheung participated in men's 100 m backstroke. He was assigned to heat six. He finished in 1:14.0, ranked 6th and the last in the heat and 25nd overall. Only the fastest 16 advanced to the semi-final, so Cheung was eliminated. The gold medal was won by David Theile from Australia, silver by John Monckton and bronze by Frank McKinney from the US.

Athlete	Event	Heat		Semifinal		Final		Ref.
Athlete	Event	Time	Rank	Time	Rank	Time	Rank	Ref.
Cheung Kin Man	Men's 100 m backstroke	1:14.0	6	Did not advance			25	
Cheung Kin Man	Men's 100 m freestyle	59.8	4	Did not advance			=22	
Wan Shiu Ming	Men's 100 m freestyle	1:00.7	7	Did not advance			=32	
Wan Shiu Ming	Men's 400 m freestyle	5:02.6	7	Did not advance			32	
