= Hong Kong at the 1996 Summer Olympics =

- IOC code: HKG
- NOC: Sports Federation and Olympic Committee of Hong Kong
- Website: www.hkolympic.org (in Chinese and English)

in Atlanta
- Competitors: 23 in 10 sports
- Flag bearers: Chan Sau Ying (Opening); Lee Lai Shan (Closing)
- Officials: ?
- Medals Ranked 49th: Gold 1 Silver 0 Bronze 0 Total 1

Summer Olympics appearances (overview)
- 1952; 1956; 1960; 1964; 1968; 1972; 1976; 1980; 1984; 1988; 1992; 1996; 2000; 2004; 2008; 2012; 2016; 2020; 2024; 2028

Hong Kong competed at the 1996 Summer Olympics in Atlanta, United States, for the last time as a British territory.

At these Games, Hong Kong won its first Olympic medal. Lee Lai Shan won a gold medal in sailing, in the board (mistral) event.

== Medalists ==
Medal	Name	Sport	Event	Date
Gold	Lee Lai Shan	Sailing	Women's Mistral One Design	29 July

== Competitors ==
The following is the list of number of competitors in the Games.

Sport	Men	Women	Total
Athletics	0	1	1
Badminton	2	1	3
Cycling	1	0	1
Diving	1	0	1
Judo	0	1	1
Rowing	1	0	1
Sailing	4	3	7
Shooting	1	0	1
Swimming	2	1	3
Table tennis	2	2	4
Total	14	9	23

== Athletics ==
Women
Track and road events

Athlete	Event	Heats		Quarterfinal		Semifinal		Final	
Athlete	Event	Result	Rank	Result	Rank	Result	Rank	Result	Rank
Chan Sau Ying	100 metres hurdles	13.63	39	Did not advance					

== Badminton ==
Men

Athlete	Event	Round of 32	Round of 16	Quarterfinals	Semifinals	Final	
Athlete	Event	Opposition Result	Opposition Result	Opposition Result	Opposition Result	Opposition Result	Rank
Chan Siu Kwong; Tim He	Doubles	Archer / Hunt (GBR); L 11–15, 12–15	Did not advance				

Mixed

Athlete	Event	Round of 32	Round of 16	Quarterfinals	Semifinals	Final	
Athlete	Event	Opposition Result	Opposition Result	Opposition Result	Opposition Result	Opposition Result	Rank
Chan Oi Ni; Tim He	Doubles	Gil / Kim (KOR); L 6–15, 10–15	Did not advance				

== Cycling ==
=== Road ===
Men

Athlete	Event	Time	Rank
Wong Kam Po	Road race	DNF	

== Diving ==
Men

Athlete	Event	Preliminary		Semifinal		Final	
Athlete	Event	Points	Rank	Points	Rank	Points	Rank
Ng Sui	10 m platform	273.30	33	Did not advance			

== Judo ==
Women

Athlete	Event	Round of 32	Round of 16	Quarterfinals	Semifinals	Repechage			Final	
Athlete	Event	Round of 32	Round of 16	Quarterfinals	Semifinals	Round 1	Round 2	Round 3	Final	
Athlete	Event	Opposition Result	Opposition Result	Opposition Result	Opposition Result	Opposition Result	Opposition Result	Opposition Result	Opposition Result	Rank
Wu Ching Hui	–61 kg	Tbessi (TUN); L	Did not advance							

== Rowing ==
Men

Athlete	Event	Heats		Repechage		Semifinals		Final	
Athlete	Event	Time	Rank	Time	Rank	Time	Rank	Time	Rank
Michael Tse	Single sculls	8:11.51	5 R	8:31.41	4 SC/D	7:51.15	5 FD	8:06.43	21

== Sailing ==
Men

Athlete	Event	Race											Net points	Final rank
Athlete	Event	1	2	3	4	5	6	7	8	9	10	11	Net points	Final rank
Sam Wong	Mistral One Design	18	~~39~~	26	30	21	~~47~~	16	23	22	—N/a		156	28
Chan Yuk Wah; Andrew Service	470	~~37~~	34	~~35~~	30	30	25	35	31	34	22	35	276	36

Women

Athlete	Event	Race											Net points	Final rank
Athlete	Event	1	2	3	4	5	6	7	8	9	10	11	Net points	Final rank
Lee Lai Shan	Mistral One Design	3	2	2	2	4	2	~~7~~	1	~~28~~	—N/a		16	1st place, gold medalist(s)
Cheung Mei Han; Tung Chun Mei	470	19	~~22~~	~~23~~	18	13	21	20	22	15	19	17	164	20

Open
Fleet racing

Athlete	Event	Race											Net points	Final rank
Athlete	Event	1	2	3	4	5	6	7	8	9	10	11	Net points	Final rank
Yang Fung	Laser	44	33	~~47~~	39	46	43	44	29	~~47~~	43	36	357	46

== Shooting ==
Men

Athlete	Event	Qualification		Final	
Athlete	Event	Points	Rank	Points	Rank
Cheng Shu Ming	Trap	114	49	Did not advance	

== Swimming ==
Men

Athlete	Event	Heats		Final A/B	
Athlete	Event	Time	Rank	Time	Rank
Mark Kwok	400 m freestyle	4:02.68	29	Did not advance	
Mark Kwok	200 m butterfly	2:04.01	34	Did not advance	
Mark Kwok	200 m individual medley	2:07.61	29	Did not advance	
Mark Kwok	400 m individual medley	4:31.13	20	Did not advance	
Arthur Li	50 m freestyle	23.77	42	Did not advance	
Arthur Li	100 m freestyle	51.84	42	Did not advance	
Arthur Li	100 m butterfly	56.92	50	Did not advance	

Women

Athlete	Event	Heats		Final A/B	
Athlete	Event	Time	Rank	Time	Rank
Snowie Pang	100 m breaststroke	1:16.02	41	Did not advance	

== Table tennis ==
Men

Athlete	Event	Group Stage				Round of 16	Quarterfinal	Semifinal	Final	
Athlete	Event	Opposition Result	Opposition Result	Opposition Result	Rank	Opposition Result	Opposition Result	Opposition Result	Opposition Result	Rank
Lo Chuen Tsung	Singles	Shibutani (JPN); L 0–2	Roßkopf (GER); L 0–2	Muñoz (MEX); W 2–0	3	Did not advance				
Chan Kong Wah; Lo Chuen Tsung	Doubles	Ri / Choi (PRK); W 2–1	Hylton / Hyatt (JAM); W 2–0	Éloi / Gatien (FRA); L 0–2	2	—N/a	Did not advance			

Women

Athlete	Event	Group Stage				Round of 16	Quarterfinal	Semifinal	Final	
Athlete	Event	Opposition Result	Opposition Result	Opposition Result	Rank	Opposition Result	Opposition Result	Opposition Result	Opposition Result	Rank
Chai Po Wa	Singles	Ramos (VEN); W 2–0	Hooman-Kloppenburg (NED); W 2–0	Simion (ROU); W 2–1	1 Q	Kim (PRK); L 1–3	Did not advance			
Chan Tan Lui	Singles	Doti (BRA); W 2–0	Tóth (HUN); W 2–1	Hugh (USA); W 2–0	1 Q	Geng (CAN); W 3–1	Chen (TPE); L 0–3	Did not advance		
Chai Po Wa; Chan Tan Lui	Doubles	González / Gorriti (PER); W 2–0	Petterson / Svensson (SWE); W 2–0	Kim / Tu (PRK); L 0–2	1 Q	—N/a	Kim / Park (KOR); L 0–3	Did not advance		
