= Hong Kong at the Olympics =

- Hong Kong SAR
- IOC code: HKG
- NOC: Sports Federation and Olympic Committee of Hong Kong, China
- Website: www.hkolympic.org (in English and Chinese)
- Medals Ranked 77th: Gold 4 Silver 3 Bronze 6 Total 13

Summer appearances
- 1952; 1956; 1960; 1964; 1968; 1972; 1976; 1980; 1984; 1988; 1992; 1996; 2000; 2004; 2008; 2012; 2016; 2020; 2024; 2028

Winter appearances
- 2002; 2006; 2010; 2014; 2018; 2022; 2026

Hong Kong first competed at the Olympic Games in 1952. It competed as a British colony until 1996. After the territory's handover in 1997, it has competed since 2000 as "Hong Kong, China" with its status as a special administrative region (SAR) of China. Throughout its history, Hong Kong has participated in every Summer Olympic Games since 1952, except in 1980 in support of the United States' boycott, and in every Winter Olympic Games since 2002.

Hong Kong won its first medal and first gold medal at the 1996 Summer Olympics, its second gold medal at the 2020 Summer Olympics, and its third and fourth gold medals at the 2024 Summer Olympics. It has also won nine other medals: three silvers and six bronzes. Its best performance to date (by number of gold medals) was in 2024, where it won two gold and two bronze medals.

== History ==
The first Olympic athlete from Hong Kong was Yvonne Yeung, who competed in 1936 for the Republic of China (ROC) instead of British Hong Kong. The ROC, today mostly limited to Taiwan and several smaller islands, currently competes as Chinese Taipei.

As a British Colony, Hong Kong was accepted into the International Olympic Committee (IOC) in 1950. The National Olympic Committee (NOC) for Hong Kong was founded in 1950 as the Amateur Sports Federation and Olympic Committee of Hong Kong, and is now known as the Sports Federation and Olympic Committee of Hong Kong, China. It was recognised by the IOC in 1951, and subsequently, Hong Kong began to be represented separately from Great Britain (for any gold medal ceremony, the colonial flag of Hong Kong was raised and the British national anthem was played).

In 1997, Hong Kong was handed over to the People's Republic of China (PRC). Two days after Hong Kong was returned to China, Hong Kong and the IOC signed an agreement stating, "It is the common aim to enable the people of Hong Kong to continue taking part in the Olympic Games and generally in sports competitions everywhere as a separate and independent entity." The Hong Kong Olympic Committee also added "China" to its name. Hong Kong maintains its own NOC and is represented separately from mainland China at the Olympics. This is understood to be a grandfathered policy though there is no written documentation evidencing this explanation. In contrast, while Macau also has its own NOC, it is not recognised by the IOC and can only compete separately from mainland China in regional games like the Asian Games.

Hong Kong's Olympic team flies the Hong Kong SAR flag and plays the PRC national anthem during official occasions like the flag-raising and victory ceremonies.

In 2008, Hong Kong was the site of the equestrian venues for the Beijing Summer Olympics.

== Medal tables ==
=== Medals by Summer Games ===
| Games | Athletes | Gold | Silver | Bronze | Total | Rank |
as British Hong Kong
| 1952 Helsinki | 4 | 0 | 0 | 0 | 0 | – |
| 1956 Melbourne | 2 | 0 | 0 | 0 | 0 | – |
| 1960 Rome | 4 | 0 | 0 | 0 | 0 | – |
| 1964 Tokyo | 39 | 0 | 0 | 0 | 0 | – |
| 1968 Mexico City | 11 | 0 | 0 | 0 | 0 | – |
| 1972 Munich | 10 | 0 | 0 | 0 | 0 | – |
| 1976 Montreal | 25 | 0 | 0 | 0 | 0 | – |
| 1980 Moscow | boycotted | | | | | |
| 1984 Los Angeles | 47 | 0 | 0 | 0 | 0 | – |
| 1988 Seoul | 48 | 0 | 0 | 0 | 0 | – |
| 1992 Barcelona | 38 | 0 | 0 | 0 | 0 | – |
| 1996 Atlanta | 23 | 1 | 0 | 0 | 1 | 49 |
as Hong Kong, China
| 2000 Sydney | 31 | 0 | 0 | 0 | 0 | – |
| 2004 Athens | 32 | 0 | 1 | 0 | 1 | 65 |
| 2008 Beijing | 34 | 0 | 0 | 0 | 0 | – |
| 2012 London | 42 | 0 | 0 | 1 | 1 | 79 |
| 2016 Rio de Janeiro | 37 | 0 | 0 | 0 | 0 | – |
| 2020 Tokyo | 46 | 1 | 2 | 3 | 6 | 49 |
| 2024 Paris | 36 | 2 | 0 | 2 | 4 | 37 |
| 2028 Los Angeles | future event | | | | | |
| 2032 Brisbane | future event | | | | | |
| Total | | 4 | 3 | 6 | 13 | 77 |

=== Medals by Winter Games ===
| Games | Athletes | Gold | Silver | Bronze | Total | Rank |
| 2002 Salt Lake City | 2 | 0 | 0 | 0 | 0 | – |
| 2006 Turin | 1 | 0 | 0 | 0 | 0 | – |
| 2010 Vancouver | 1 | 0 | 0 | 0 | 0 | – |
| 2014 Sochi | 1 | 0 | 0 | 0 | 0 | – |
| 2018 Pyeongchang | 1 | 0 | 0 | 0 | 0 | – |
| 2022 Beijing | 3 | 0 | 0 | 0 | 0 | – |
| 2026 Milano Cortina | 4 | 0 | 0 | 0 | 0 | – |
| 2030 French Alps | future event | | | | | |
| 2034 Utah | future event | | | | | |
| Total | | 0 | 0 | 0 | 0 | – |

=== Medals by summer sport ===
| Sport | Gold | Silver | Bronze | Total |
|---|---|---|---|---|
| Fencing | 3 | 0 | 0 | 3 |
| Sailing | 1 | 0 | 0 | 1 |
| Swimming | 0 | 2 | 2 | 4 |
| Table tennis | 0 | 1 | 1 | 2 |
| Cycling | 0 | 0 | 2 | 2 |
| Karate | 0 | 0 | 1 | 1 |
| Totals (6 entries) | 4 | 3 | 6 | 13 |

== List of medallists ==
| Medal | Name | Games | Sport | Event |
|---|---|---|---|---|
| Gold | Lee Lai-shan | 1996 Atlanta | Sailing | Women's sailboard (Mistral) |
| Silver | Ko Lai-chak; Li Ching | 2004 Athens | Table tennis | Men's doubles |
| Bronze | Lee Wai-sze | 2012 London | Cycling | Women's keirin |
| Gold | Cheung Ka-long | 2020 Tokyo | Fencing | Men's foil |
| Silver | Siobhán Haughey | 2020 Tokyo | Swimming | Women's 200 metre freestyle |
| Silver | Siobhán Haughey | 2020 Tokyo | Swimming | Women's 100 metre freestyle |
| Bronze | Doo Hoi-kem; Lee Ho-ching; Minnie Soo Wai-yam | 2020 Tokyo | Table tennis | Women's team |
| Bronze | Grace Lau | 2020 Tokyo | Karate | Women's kata |
| Bronze | Lee Wai-sze | 2020 Tokyo | Cycling | Women's Sprint |
| Gold | Vivian Kong | 2024 Paris | Fencing | Women's épée |
| Gold | Cheung Ka-long | 2024 Paris | Fencing | Men's foil |
| Bronze | Siobhán Haughey | 2024 Paris | Swimming | Women's 200 metre freestyle |
| Bronze | Siobhán Haughey | 2024 Paris | Swimming | Women's 100 metre freestyle |

== Multiple medallists ==
| Athlete | Sport | Games | Gold | Silver | Bronze | Total |
|---|---|---|---|---|---|---|
| Siobhán Haughey | Swimming | 2020, 2024 | 0 | 2 | 2 | 4 |
| Cheung Ka-long | Fencing | 2020, 2024 | 2 | 0 | 0 | 2 |
| Lee Wai-sze | Cycling | 2012, 2020 | 0 | 0 | 2 | 2 |

== National Olympic Committee ==
The National Olympic Committee of Hong Kong, SF&OC, has been repeatedly warned by the Independent Commission Against Corruption (ICAC) and Leisure and Cultural Services Department (LCSD) against corruption and to implement better governance. With Timothy Fok as president of the Olympic committee, there have numerous allegations of misconduct against the SF&OC and Fok. In August 2016, the Hong Kong Economic Journal released an article accusing the SF&OC and Fok of various transgressions. In April 2020, the government's Audit Commission released a 141-page report after investigating the Olympic committee, describing various failures with the SF&OC, including lax governance. An editorial published by the South China Morning Post agreed with the Audit Commission and stating that the city's sports development was at risk.

The former sports commissioner of Hong Kong, Yeung Tak-keung, said that "very few people" in the government are familiar with sports and "they often don't know much about sports, nor can they think from the perspective of sports development."

== Athlete training ==
The Hong Kong Sports Institute (HKSI) is a government-funded training center for elite athletes and potential Olympians in Hong Kong. It has been criticised for its decision to primarily fund 20 tier-A sports, including those not included in the Olympics and those which "may not even be able to achieve any breakthrough in the coming years", in turn neglecting support for other sport categories. After the Tokyo Olympics in 2021, where Hong Kong obtained its best Olympics result with six medals, Chung Pak-kwong – former chief executive of HKSI and a sports professor at Baptist University – claimed that Hong Kong's achievements at the Olympics had been disproportionate to the amount of resources invested. Chung suggested that the territory's sports developments should have translated to medals earlier, at the 2016 Summer Olympics (where it instead obtained zero medals). In one South China Morning Post article, an anonymous senior sports official suggested that Hong Kong adopt a more "medal-oriented strategy", recommending that more support be put towards sports that Asians have traditionally performed well in – such as archery or those with weight categories like judo – where "Asians are not at a disadvantage to stronger, bigger Westerners".

== Government rules ==
In November 2024, the government banned surfing, which effectively ruled out any possibility of Hong Kong participating in the surfing events at the Olympics.

== Naming ==
Prior to 1997, the team's name was "Hong Kong"; after 1997, the team's name became "Hong Kong, China". In most other languages, this name is used for translation (e.g. French: Hong Kong, Chine; Russian: Гонконг, Китай; Simplified Chinese: 中国香港; Zhōngguó Xiānggǎng). The Japanese team name is Honkon Chaina (ホンコン・チャイナ) and the Korean team name is Hongkong Chaina (홍콩차이나), using English transliterations of the word "China" instead of the native translation.

== See also ==
- List of flag bearers for Hong Kong at the Olympics
- Category:Olympic competitors for Hong Kong
- Hong Kong at the Paralympics
- Hong Kong at the Asian Games
- Hong Kong at the Commonwealth Games
- Tropical nations at the Winter Olympics
