= Hong Kong at the 1952 Summer Olympics =

- IOC code: HKG
- NOC: Sports Federation and Olympic Committee of Hong Kong

in Helsinki
- Competitors: 4 in 1 sport
- Flag bearer: Unnamed team official
- Medals: Gold 0 Silver 0 Bronze 0 Total 0

Summer Olympics appearances (overview)
- 1952; 1956; 1960; 1964; 1968; 1972; 1976; 1980; 1984; 1988; 1992; 1996; 2000; 2004; 2008; 2012; 2016; 2020; 2024

Hong Kong competed in the Summer Olympic Games for the first time at the 1952 Summer Olympics in Helsinki, Finland.

Four athletes competed for Hong Kong, and a non-participant served as flag-bearer for the Hong Kong delegation at the opening ceremony.

== Competitors ==
The following is the list of the number of competitors in the Games.

Sport	Men	Women	Total
Swimming	2	2	4
Total	2	2	4

== Swimming ==
Men

Heat/semifinal ranks given are within the group.

Athlete	Event	Heat		Semifinal		Final	
Athlete	Event	Time	Rank	Time	Rank	Time	Rank
Cheung Kin Man	100 m freestyle	1:00.3	5	1:00.9	8	Did not advance	
Francisco Monteiro	100 m freestyle	1:03.1	5	Did not advance			
Cheung Kin Man	400 m freestyle	5:11.4	6	Did not advance			
Francisco Monteiro	400 m freestyle	5:21.6	6	Did not advance			
Cheung Kin Man	1500 m freestyle	20:50.2	6	—N/a		Did not advance	
Francisco Monteiro	1500 m freestyle	22:26.7	6	—N/a		Did not advance	

Women

Heat ranks given are within the group.

Athlete	Event	Heat		Semifinal		Final	
Athlete	Event	Time	Rank	Time	Rank	Time	Rank
Cynthia Eager	100 m freestyle	1:16.8	7	Did not advance			
Cynthia Eager	400 m freestyle	5:55.8	7	Did not advance			
Irene Kwok	200 m breaststroke	3:19.2	6	Did not advance			
