= Hong Kong at the 2000 Summer Olympics =

- IOC code: HKG
- NOC: Sports Federation and Olympic Committee of Hong Kong, China
- Website: www.hkolympic.org (in Chinese and English)

in Sydney
- Competitors: 31 (19 men and 12 women) in 9 sports
- Flag bearer: Fenella Ng
- Officials: ?
- Medals: Gold 0 Silver 0 Bronze 0 Total 0

Summer Olympics appearances (overview)
- 1952; 1956; 1960; 1964; 1968; 1972; 1976; 1980; 1984; 1988; 1992; 1996; 2000; 2004; 2008; 2012; 2016; 2020; 2024

Hong Kong competed at the 2000 Summer Olympics in Sydney, Australia under the name "Hong Kong, China" for the first time, as these were the first Games after the territory's handover from the United Kingdom to China in 1997. 31 athletes competed across 9 sports; Chiang Wai Hung, Ho Kwan Lung, Tang Hon Sing, William To Wai Lok and Maggie Chan Man Yee in athletics, Tam Kai Chuen, Ng Wei, Koon Wai Chee Louisa and Ling Wanting in badminton, Yueng Alexandra Ka-Wah and Wong Kam Po in cycling, Yu Yuet in diving, Lo Sing Yan, Lui Kam Chi and Fenella Ng in rowing, Chi Ho Ho and Lee Lai Shan in sailing, Li Hao Jian in shooting, Mark Kin Ming Kwok, Matthew Hon Ming Kwok, Tam Chi Kin, Lik Sun Fong, Wing Harbeth Fu, Hiu Wai Sherry Tsai, Yan Kay Flora Kong, Chan Wing Suet and Caroline Sin Wing Chiu in swimming, and Cheung Yuk, Leung Chu Yan, Song Ah Sim and Wong Ching in table tennis. No Hong Kong athlete won a medal in any event.

== Competitors ==
The following is the list of number of competitors in the Games.

Sport	Men	Women	Total
Athletics	4	1	5
Badminton	2	2	4
Cycling	1	1	2
Diving	1	0	1
Rowing	2	1	3
Sailing	1	1	2
Shooting	1	0	1
Swimming	5	4	9
Table tennis	2	2	4
Total	19	12	31

== Athletics ==
Track

Athlete	Event	Heat		Quarterfinal		Semifinal		Final	
Athlete	Event	Result	Rank	Result	Rank	Result	Rank	Result	Rank
Chiang Wai Hung	Men's 100m	10.64	6	Did not advance					
Chiang Wai Hung; Ho Kwan Lung; Tang Hon Sing; William To Wai Lok	Men's 4 × 100 m relay	40.15	33	Did not advance					
Maggie Chan Man Yee	Women's 5000m	16:20.43	43	Did not advance					
Maggie Chan Man Yee	Women's 10000m	35:21.20	39	Did not advance					

== Badminton ==
Singles

Athlete	Event	Round of 32	Round of 16	Quarterfinal	Semifinal	Final / BM	
Athlete	Event	Opposition Score	Opposition Score	Opposition Score	Opposition Score	Opposition Score	Rank
Tam Kai Chuen	Men's singles	Bye	Hendrawan (INA); L 7–15, 7–15	Did not advance			
Ng Wei	Men's singles	Bye	Ji X (CHN); L 15–7, 4–15, 11–15	Did not advance			
Koon Wai Chee Louisa	Women's singles	Bye	Morgan (GBR); L 11–8, 3–11, 1–11	Did not advance			
Ling Wanting	Women's singles	Bye	Gong (CHN); L 4–11, 3–11	Did not advance			

Doubles

Athlete	Event	Round of 32	Round of 16	Quarterfinal	Semifinal	Final / BM	
Athlete	Event	Opposition Score	Opposition Score	Opposition Score	Opposition Score	Opposition Score	Rank
Koon Wai Chee Louisa; Ling Wanting	Women's doubles	Kirkegaard (DEN) / Olsen (DEN); L 9–15, 15–13, 5–15	Did not advance				
Koon Wai Chee Louisa; Tam Kai Chuen	Mixed doubles	Bergström (SWE) / Karlsson (SWE); L 13–15, 15–10, 12–15	Did not advance				

== Cycling ==
Cross country

Athlete	Event	Time	Rank
Yueng Alexandra Ka-Wah	Women's cross-country	2:11:29	27

Track cycling

Athlete	Event	Points	Rank
Wong Kam Po	Men's points race	14	11

== Diving ==
Athlete	Event	Preliminaries		Semifinals				Final	
Athlete	Event	Points	Rank	Points	Rank	Total	Rank	Points	Rank
Yu Yuet	Men's 3m springboard	227.64	48	Did not advance					

== Rowing ==
Athlete	Event	Heats		Repechage		Semifinals		Final	
Athlete	Event	Time	Rank	Time	Rank	Time	Rank	Time	Rank
Lo Sing Yan; Lui Kam Chi	Men's lightweight double sculls	7:09.75	5 R	7:05.05	4 FC	—N/a		6:49.19	16
Fenella Ng	Women's single sculls	8:19.88	5 R	8:16.62	4 SC/D	8:21.40	3 FC	8:11.06	16

== Sailing ==
Hong Kong sent one man and one woman to the Sailing competition at the 2000 Sydney Olympics.

Men

Athlete	Event	Race											Net points	Final rank
Athlete	Event	1	2	3	4	5	6	7	8	9	10	M*	Net points	Final rank
Chi Ho Ho	Mistral	12	29	29	19	24	~~31~~	27	13	18	~~32~~	29	200	28

Women

Athlete	Event	Race											Net points	Final rank
Athlete	Event	1	2	3	4	5	6	7	8	9	10	M*	Net points	Final rank
Lee Lai Shan	Mistral	5	10	5	8	~~17~~	10	6	6	4	5	~~20~~	59	6

M = Medal race; OCS = On course side of the starting line; DSQ = Disqualified; DNF = Did not finish; DNS= Did not start; RDG = Redress given

== Shooting ==
Men

Athlete	Event	Qualification		Final	
Athlete	Event	Points	Rank	Total	Rank
Li Hao Jian	25m rapid fire pistol	571	18	Did not advance	

== Swimming ==
Hong Kong swimmers earned qualifying standards in the following events (up to a maximum of 2 swimmers in each event at the A-standard time, and 1 at the B-standard time):

Men

Athlete	Event	Heat		Semifinal		Final	
Athlete	Event	Time	Rank	Time	Rank	Time	Rank
Mark Kin Ming Kwok	200 m freestyle	1:52.71	26	Did not advance			
Mark Kin Ming Kwok	400 m freestyle	3:58.94	30	Did not advance			
Mark Kin Ming Kwok	200 m butterfly	2:01.99	32	Did not advance			
Matthew Hon Ming Kwok	100 m breaststroke	1:05.28	50	Did not advance			
Tam Chi Kin	200 m breaststroke	2:24.04	42	Did not advance			
Lik Sun Fong	200 m backstroke	2:05.47	33	Did not advance			
Lik Sun Fong	200 m Individual Medley	2:09.00	46	Did not advance			
Lik Sun Fong	400 m Individual Medley	4:29.02	34	Did not advance			
Wing Harbeth Fu	50 m freestyle	24.20	53	Did not advance			

Women

Athlete	Event	Heat		Semifinal		Final	
Athlete	Event	Time	Rank	Time	Rank	Time	Rank
Hiu Wai Sherry Tsai	50 m freestyle	27.38	47	Did not advance			
Hiu Wai Sherry Tsai	100 m backstroke	1:05.28	33	Did not advance			
Yan Kay Flora Kong	100 m butterfly	1:04.09	42	Did not advance			
Chan Wing Suet	200 m butterfly	2:19.86	33	Did not advance			
Caroline Sin Wing Chiu	100 m breaststroke	1:15.87	36	Did not advance			

== Table tennis ==
=== Men ===
Athlete	Event	Group stage			Round of 32	Round of 16	Quarterfinals	Semifinals	Final / BM	
Athlete	Event	Opposition Result	Opposition Result	Rank	Opposition Result	Opposition Result	Opposition Result	Opposition Result	Opposition Result	Rank
Cheung Yuk	Singles	Hoyama (BRA); W 3–2	Liu (CAN); W 3–1	1 Q	Matsushita (JPN); L 0–3	Did not advance				
Leung Chu Yan	Singles	Ryu (KOR); L 0–3	Smythe (AUS); L 2–3	3	Did not advance					
Cheung Yuk; Leung Chu Yan	Doubles	Kreanga (GRE) / Tsiokas (GRE); W 2–1	Gerada (AUS) / Smythe (AUS); W 2–0	1 Q	Lee C-S (KOR) / Ryu (KOR); L 3–2	Did not advance				

=== Women ===
Athlete	Event	Group stage			Round of 32	Round of 16	Quarterfinals	Semifinals	Final / BM	
Athlete	Event	Opposition Result	Opposition Result	Rank	Opposition Result	Opposition Result	Opposition Result	Opposition Result	Opposition Result	Rank
Song Ah Sim	Singles	Palina (RUS); L 0–3	Musoke (UGA); W 3–0	2	Did not advance					
Wong Ching	Singles	Melnik (RUS); L 2–3	Abdul-Aziz (EGY); W 3–0	2	Did not advance					
Song Ah Sim; Wong Ching	Doubles	Fujinuma (JPN) / Konishi (JPN); L 1–2	Morel (CHI) / Tepes (CHI); W 2–0	2	Did not advance					
