= Hong Kong at the 2016 Summer Olympics =

- IOC code: HKG
- NOC: Sports Federation and Olympic Committee of Hong Kong, China
- Website: www.hkolympic.org (in Chinese and English)

in Rio de Janeiro
- Competitors: 37 in 9 sports
- Flag bearers: Stephanie Au (opening); Chan Chun Hing (closing)
- Medals: Gold 0 Silver 0 Bronze 0 Total 0

Summer Olympics appearances (overview)
- 1952; 1956; 1960; 1964; 1968; 1972; 1976; 1980; 1984; 1988; 1992; 1996; 2000; 2004; 2008; 2012; 2016; 2020; 2024; 2028

Hong Kong competed at the 2016 Summer Olympics in Rio de Janeiro, Brazil, from 5 to 21 August 2016. This was the territory's sixteenth appearance at the Summer Olympics, since its debut as a British colony in 1952.

The Sports Federation and Olympic Committee of Hong Kong, China sent a team of 37 athletes, 13 men and 24 women, to compete in nine sports at the Games. The nation's full roster in Rio de Janeiro was smaller by five athletes than in London, and also, featured more female athletes than males for only the second time in its Olympic history.

Eleven athletes from Hong Kong previously competed at London 2012, including bronze medalist Lee Wai Sze in track cycling, badminton player Yip Pui Yin in the women's singles, mountain biker Chan Chun Hing, and 37-year-old table tennis player Tie Ya Na, who attended her fourth Olympics as the oldest and most experienced member. Other notable athletes on the Hong Kong roster also featured Youth Olympians Doo Hoi Kem (table tennis) and 18-year-old Siobhán Haughey (swimming), Asia's top-ranked épée fencer Vivian Kong, and backstroke swimmer and three-time Olympian Stephanie Au, who was selected by the committee to carry the Hong Kong flag at the opening ceremony.

Unlike the previous Games, Hong Kong failed to win a single medal in Rio de Janeiro. The special administrative region's best medal hope, Lee Wai Sze missed out on a place in the finals of her respective track cycling events, following her involvement in the controversial clash in the women's keirin, and her quarterfinal defeat to Germany's eventual champion Kristina Vogel in the women's sprint. Meanwhile, windsurfer Michael Cheng wrapped up his Olympic campaign with one of Hong Kong's most unexpected outcomes at the Games, finishing eighth overall.

== Athletics ==
Hong Kong athletes have so far achieved qualifying standards in the following athletics events (up to a maximum of 3 athletes in each event):

Key

- Note–Ranks given for track events are within the athlete's heat only
- Q = Qualified for the next round
- q = Qualified for the next round as a fastest loser or, in field events, by position without achieving the qualifying target
- NR = National record
- N/A = Round not applicable for the event
- Bye = Athlete not required to compete in round

Track & road events

Athlete	Event	Final	
Athlete	Event	Result	Rank
Yiu Kit Ching	Women's marathon	2:36:11	39

Field events

Athlete	Event	Qualification		Final	
Athlete	Event	Distance	Position	Distance	Position
Chan Ming Tai	Men's long jump	7.79	17	Did not advance	

== Badminton ==
Hong Kong has qualified a total of seven badminton players for each of the following events into the Olympic tournament based on the BWF World Rankings as of 5 May 2016: two entries in the men's singles, one in the women's singles, and a pair each in the women's and mixed doubles.

Men

Athlete	Event	Group Stage			Elimination	Quarterfinal	Semifinal	Final / BM	
Athlete	Event	Opposition Score	Opposition Score	Rank	Opposition Score	Opposition Score	Opposition Score	Opposition Score	Rank
Hu Yun	Singles	Abián (ESP); W (21–18, 21–19)	Yu Woon (BRU); W (21–16, 21–15)	1 Q	Chou T-c (TPE); L (10–21, 13–21)	Did not advance			
Ng Ka Long	Singles	Martins (POR); W (21–17, 21–18)	Giuffre (CAN); W (21–11, 21–14)	1 Q	Son W-h (KOR); L (21–23, 17–21)	Did not advance			

Women

Athlete	Event	Group Stage				Elimination	Quarterfinal	Semifinal	Final / BM	
Athlete	Event	Opposition Score	Opposition Score	Opposition Score	Rank	Opposition Score	Opposition Score	Opposition Score	Opposition Score	Rank
Yip Pui Yin	Singles	Intanon (THA); L (18–21, 12–21)	Tolmoff (EST); L (21–5, 13–21, 19–21)	—N/a	3	Did not advance				
Poon Lok Yan; Tse Ying Suet	Doubles	Maheswari / Polii (INA); L (9–21, 11–21)	Olver / Smith (GBR); L (17–21, 21–18, 16–21)	Hoo K M / Woon K W (MAS); L (15–21, 13–21)	4	—N/a	Did not advance			

Mixed

Athlete	Event	Group Stage				Quarterfinal	Semifinal	Final / BM	
Athlete	Event	Opposition Score	Opposition Score	Opposition Score	Rank	Opposition Score	Opposition Score	Opposition Score	Rank
Lee Chun Hei; Chau Hoi Wah	Doubles	Zhang N / Zhao Yl (CHN); L (16–21, 15–21)	Jordan / Susanto (INA); L (12–21, 21–19, 15–21)	Fuchs / Michels (GER); W (21–17, 21–14)	3	Did not advance			

== Cycling ==
=== Road ===
Hong Kong has qualified one rider in the men's Olympic road race by virtue of his best individual ranking at the 2015 Asian Championships.

Athlete	Event	Time	Rank
Cheung King Lok	Men's road race	Did not finish	

=== Track ===
Following the completion of the 2016 UCI Track Cycling World Championships, Hong Kong riders have accumulated spots in women's sprint and women's keirin, as well as both the men's and women's omnium, by virtue of their final individual UCI Olympic rankings in those events.

Sprint

Athlete	Event	Qualification		Round 1	Repechage 1	Round 2	Repechage 2	Quarterfinals	Semifinals	Final	
Athlete	Event	Time Speed (km/h)	Rank	Opposition Time Speed (km/h)	Opposition Time Speed (km/h)	Opposition Time Speed (km/h)	Opposition Time Speed (km/h)	Opposition Time Speed (km/h)	Opposition Time Speed (km/h)	Opposition Time Speed (km/h)	Rank
Lee Wai Sze	Women's sprint	10.800; 66.666	3 Q	Cueff (FRA); W 11.355; 63.408	Bye	Meares (AUS); W 11.551; 62.332	Bye	Vogel (GER); L, L	Did not advance	5th place final Zhong Ts (CHN); Krupeckaitė (LTU); Voynova (RUS); L	6

Keirin

Athlete	Event	1st Round	Repechage	2nd Round	Final
Athlete	Event	Rank	Rank	Rank	Rank
Lee Wai Sze	Women's keirin	1 Q	Bye	DNF	7

Omnium

Athlete	Event	Scratch race		Individual pursuit			Elimination race		Time trial			Flying lap			Points race		Total points	Rank
Athlete	Event	Rank	Points	Time	Rank	Points	Rank	Points	Time	Rank	Points	Time	Rank	Points	Points	Rank	Total points	Rank
Leung Chun Wing	Men's omnium	16	20	4:29.162	13	16	13	16	1:03.730	8	26	12.265	8	26	1	11	105	11
Diao Xiao Juan	Women's omnium	11	20	3:44.455	14	14	14	14	36.944	16	10	14.499	11	20	22	10	100	12

=== Mountain biking ===
Hong Kong has qualified one mountain biker for the men's Olympic cross-country race, by virtue of a top two national finish, not yet qualified, at the 2015 Asian Championships.

Athlete	Event	Time	Rank
Chan Chun Hing	Men's cross-country	1:44:41	32

== Fencing ==
Hong Kong has entered three fencers into the Olympic competition. Vivian Kong had claimed a spot in the women's épée, as one of the two highest-ranking fencers coming from the Asian zone in the FIE Adjusted Official Rankings. Meanwhile, Cheung Ka Long and London 2012 foil fencer Lin Po Heung were added to the Hong Kong roster by virtue of a top three finish at the Asian Zonal Qualifier in Wuxi, China.

Athlete	Event	Round of 64	Round of 32	Round of 16	Quarterfinal	Semifinal	Final / BM	
Athlete	Event	Opposition Score	Opposition Score	Opposition Score	Opposition Score	Opposition Score	Opposition Score	Rank
Cheung Ka Long	Men's foil	Bye	Heo J (KOR); W 15–8	Toldo (BRA); L 10–15	Did not advance			
Vivian Kong	Women's épée	Bye	Shutova (RUS); W 15–10	Fiamingo (ITA); L 11–15	Did not advance			
Lin Po Heung	Women's foil	Bye	Di Francisca (ITA); L 8–15	Did not advance				

== Golf ==
Hong Kong has entered one golfer into the Olympic tournament. Tiffany Chan (world no. 434) qualified directly among the top 60 eligible players for the women's event based on the IGF World Rankings as of 11 July 2016.

Athlete	Event	Round 1	Round 2	Round 3	Round 4	Total		
Athlete	Event	Score	Score	Score	Score	Score	Par	Rank
Tiffany Chan	Women's	71	75	73	69	288	+4	37

== Rowing ==
Hong Kong has qualified one boat each in the men's and women's lightweight double sculls for the Olympics at the 2016 Asia & Oceania Continental Qualification Regatta in Chungju, South Korea.

Athlete	Event	Heats		Repechage		Semifinals		Final	
Athlete	Event	Time	Rank	Time	Rank	Time	Rank	Time	Rank
Chiu Hin Chun; Tang Chiu Mang	Men's lightweight double sculls	6:45.05	5 R	7:22.05	6 SC/D	7:33.47	4 FD	6:57.95	19
Lee Ka Man; Lee Yuen Yin	Women's lightweight double sculls	7:29.87	5 R	8:20.96	6 SC/D	8:14.17	2 FC	7:46.85	16

Qualification Legend: FA=Final A (medal); FB=Final B (non-medal); FC=Final C (non-medal); FD=Final D (non-medal); FE=Final E (non-medal); FF=Final F (non-medal); SA/B=Semifinals A/B; SC/D=Semifinals C/D; SE/F=Semifinals E/F; QF=Quarterfinals; R=Repechage

== Sailing ==
Hong Kong sailors have qualified one boat in each of the following classes through the individual fleet World Championships, and Asian qualifying regattas. Windsurfers Michael Cheng and Sonia Lo were selected to the Hong Kong roster at the Asian Sailing Championships in Dubai, United Arab Emirates on 14 March 2016.

Athlete	Event	Race													Net points	Final rank
Athlete	Event	1	2	3	4	5	6	7	8	9	10	11	12	M*	Net points	Final rank
Michael Cheng	Men's RS:X	3	6	11	5	6	16	9	13	13	21	17	~~26~~	6	126	8
Sonia Lo	Women's RS:X	15	15	15	16	19	~~22~~	11	17	17	7	12	13	EL	157	17

M = Medal race; EL = Eliminated – did not advance into the medal race

== Swimming ==
Hong Kong swimmers have so far achieved qualifying standards in the following events (up to a maximum of 2 swimmers in each event at the Olympic Qualifying Time (OQT), and potentially 1 at the Olympic Selection Time (OST)):

A total of seven swimmers (one man and six women) were selected to the Hong Kong's Olympic roster, with veterans Sze Hang Yu and Stephanie Au racing in the pool for their third Games and Geoffrey Cheah becoming the first male to compete in 12 years.

Men

Athlete	Event	Heat		Semifinal		Final	
Athlete	Event	Time	Rank	Time	Rank	Time	Rank
Geoffrey Cheah	50 m freestyle	22.46	32	Did not advance			

Women

Athlete	Event	Heat		Semifinal		Final	
Athlete	Event	Time	Rank	Time	Rank	Time	Rank
Camille Cheng	50 m freestyle	25.92	44	Did not advance			
Camille Cheng	100 m freestyle	54.92	24	Did not advance			
Camille Cheng	200 m freestyle	1:59.71	29	Did not advance			
Siobhán Haughey	200 m freestyle	1:56.91	9 Q	1:57.56	13	Did not advance	
Siobhán Haughey	200 m individual medley	DNS		Did not advance			
Yvette Kong	100 m breaststroke	1:09.56	32	Did not advance			
Yvette Kong	200 m breaststroke	DNS		Did not advance			
Claudia Lau	100 m backstroke	1:01.27	19	Did not advance			
Claudia Lau	200 m backstroke	2:10.94	18	Did not advance			
Stephanie Au; Camille Cheng; Yvette Kong; Sze Hang Yu	4 × 100 m medley relay	4:03.85	14	—N/a		Did not advance	

== Table tennis ==
Hong Kong has fielded a team of six athletes into the table tennis competition at the Games. Tang Peng, Wong Chun Ting, 2014 Youth Olympic runner-up Doo Hoi Kem, and Lee Ho Ching were automatically selected among the top 22 eligible players each in their respective singles events based on the ITTF Olympic Rankings.

Ho Kwan Kit and three-time Olympian Tie Ya Na were each awarded the third spot to build the men's and women's teams for the Games by virtue of a top 10 national finish in the ITTF Olympic Rankings.

Men

Athlete	Event	Preliminary	Round 1	Round 2	Round 3	Round of 16	Quarterfinals	Semifinals	Final / BM	
Athlete	Event	Opposition Result	Opposition Result	Opposition Result	Opposition Result	Opposition Result	Opposition Result	Opposition Result	Opposition Result	Rank
Tang Peng	Singles	Bye			Calderano (BRA); L 2–4	Did not advance				
Wong Chun Ting	Singles	Bye			Wang (CAN); W 4–0	Niwa (JPN); L 3–4	Did not advance			
Ho Kwan Kit; Tang Peng; Wong Chun Ting	Team	—N/a				Australia; W 3–0	Japan; L 1–3	Did not advance		

Women

Athlete	Event	Preliminary	Round 1	Round 2	Round 3	Round of 16	Quarterfinals	Semifinals	Final / BM	
Athlete	Event	Opposition Result	Opposition Result	Opposition Result	Opposition Result	Opposition Result	Opposition Result	Opposition Result	Opposition Result	Rank
Doo Hoi Kem	Singles	Bye			Póta (HUN); W 4–2	Ding N (CHN); L 0–4	Did not advance			
Lee Ho Ching	Singles	Bye			Bilenko (UKR); W 4–1	Li Xx (CHN); L 0–4	Did not advance			
Doo Hoi Kem; Lee Ho Ching; Tie Ya Na	Team	—N/a				Chinese Taipei; W 3–1	Germany; L 1–3	Did not advance		

== See also ==
- Hong Kong at the 2016 Summer Paralympics
