= Hong Kong at the 2004 Summer Olympics =

- IOC code: HKG
- NOC: Sports Federation and Olympic Committee of Hong Kong, China
- Website: www.hkolympic.org (in Chinese and English)

in Athens
- Competitors: 32 in 10 sports
- Flag bearers: Hiu Wai Sherry Tsai (opening); Li Ching and Ko Lai Chak (closing)
- Medals Ranked 65th: Gold 0 Silver 1 Bronze 0 Total 1

Summer Olympics appearances (overview)
- 1952; 1956; 1960; 1964; 1968; 1972; 1976; 1980; 1984; 1988; 1992; 1996; 2000; 2004; 2008; 2012; 2016; 2020; 2024; 2028

Hong Kong competed at the 2004 Summer Olympics in Athens, Greece, from 13 to 29 August 2004. It was the territory's thirteenth appearance at the Olympics and, at the opening ceremony, its team was the last to enter the stadium before the host nation because of the use of the Greek alphabet.

The Sports Federation and Olympic Committee of Hong Kong, China sent a total of 32 athletes to the Games, 18 women and 14 men, to compete in 10 sports, a single athlete more than four years earlier. For the first time in Olympic history, Hong Kong was represented by more female than male athletes. Thirteen of them had previously competed in Sydney, including track cyclist Wong Kam Po, Mistral windsurfer and 1996 Olympic champion Lee Lai Shan, and backstroke swimmer Sherry Tsai, who eventually became the nation's flag bearer in the opening ceremony.

Hong Kong left Athens with a silver medal won by table tennis players Ko Lai Chak and Li Ching in the men's doubles tournament.

== Medalists ==
Medal	Name	Sport	Event	Date
Silver	Ko Lai Chak; Li Ching	Table tennis	Men's doubles	August 21

== Athletics ==
Hong Kong athletes achieved qualifying standards in the following athletics events (up to a maximum of 3 athletes in each event at the 'A' Standard, and 1 at the 'B' Standard).

Key

- Note–Ranks given for track events are within the athlete's heat only
- Q = Qualified for the next round
- q = Qualified for the next round as a fastest loser or, in field events, by position without achieving the qualifying target
- NR = National record
- N/A = Round not applicable for the event
- Bye = Athlete not required to compete in round

Men
Track & road events

Athlete	Event	Heat		Quarterfinal		Semifinal		Final	
Athlete	Event	Result	Rank	Result	Rank	Result	Rank	Result	Rank
Chiang Wai Hung	100 m	10.70	6	Did not advance					

== Badminton ==
Athlete	Event	Round of 32	Round of 16	Quarterfinal	Semifinal	Final / BM	
Athlete	Event	Opposition Score	Opposition Score	Opposition Score	Opposition Score	Opposition Score	Rank
Ng Wei	Men's singles	Lee C W (MAS); L 3–15, 13–15	Did not advance				
Ling Wan Ting	Women's singles	Cheng S-C (TPE); L 9–11, 8–11	Did not advance				
Wang Chen	Women's singles	Blanco (PER); W 11–1, 11–4	Jie Y (NED); W 8–11, 13–10, 11–8	Zhang N (CHN); L 11–9, 6–11, 7–11	Did not advance		
Koon Wai Chee; Li Wing Mui	Women's doubles	—N/a	Emms / Kellogg (GBR); L 4–15, 4–15	Did not advance			

== Cycling ==
=== Road ===
Athlete	Event	Time	Rank
Wong Kam Po	Men's road race	Did not finish	

=== Track ===
Omnium

Athlete	Event	Points	Laps	Rank
Wong Kam Po	Men's points race	2	0	20

== Fencing ==
Men

Athlete	Event	Round of 64	Round of 32	Round of 16	Quarterfinal	Semifinal	Final / BM	
Athlete	Event	Opposition Score	Opposition Score	Opposition Score	Opposition Score	Opposition Score	Opposition Score	Rank
Lau Kwok Kin	Individual foil	McGuire (CAN); L 14–15	Did not advance					

Women

Athlete	Event	Round of 32	Round of 16	Quarterfinal	Semifinal	Final / BM	
Athlete	Event	Opposition Score	Opposition Score	Opposition Score	Opposition Score	Opposition Score	Rank
Chan Ying Man	Individual foil	Varga (HUN); L 3–15	Did not advance				
Chow Tsz Ki	Individual sabre	E Jacobson (USA); L 11–15	Did not advance				

== Rowing ==
Hong Kong rowers qualified the following boats:

Men

Athlete	Event	Heats		Repechage		Semifinals		Final	
Athlete	Event	Time	Rank	Time	Rank	Time	Rank	Time	Rank
Law Hiu Fung	Single sculls	7:28.16	3 R	7:10.72	2 SA/B/C	7:17.52	6 FC	7:10.75	18
Lo Ting Wai; So Sau Wah	Lightweight double sculls	6:43.49	5 R	6:41.09	5 SC/D	6:37.03	4	Did not advance	

Qualification Legend: FA=Final A (medal); FB=Final B (non-medal); FC=Final C (non-medal); FD=Final D (non-medal); FE=Final E (non-medal); FF=Final F (non-medal); SA/B=Semifinals A/B; SC/D=Semifinals C/D; SE/F=Semifinals E/F; R=Repechage

== Sailing ==
Hong Kong sailors have qualified one boat for each of the following events.

Men

Athlete	Event	Race											Net points	Final rank
Athlete	Event	1	2	3	4	5	6	7	8	9	10	M*	Net points	Final rank
Chi Ho Ho	Mistral	21	22	13	~~24~~	18	3	17	7	21	9	7	138	14

Women

Athlete	Event	Race											Net points	Final rank
Athlete	Event	1	2	3	4	5	6	7	8	9	10	M*	Net points	Final rank
Lee Lai Shan	Mistral	3	8	5	1	~~OCS~~	3	2	4	5	8	3	42	4

M = Medal race; OCS = On course side of the starting line; DSQ = Disqualified; DNF = Did not finish; DNS= Did not start; RDG = Redress given

== Shooting ==
Hong Kong has qualified a single shooter.

Women

Athlete	Event	Qualification		Final	
Athlete	Event	Points	Rank	Points	Rank
Lo Ka Kay	10 m air pistol	371	34	Did not advance	

== Swimming ==
Hong Kong swimmers earned qualifying standards in the following events (up to a maximum of 2 swimmers in each event at the A-standard time, and 1 at the B-standard time):

Men

Athlete	Event	Heat		Semifinal		Final	
Athlete	Event	Time	Rank	Time	Rank	Time	Rank
Chi Kin Daniel Tam	100 m breaststroke	1:05.11	44	Did not advance			
Chi Kin Daniel Tam	200 m breaststroke	2:19.48	41	Did not advance			

Women

Athlete	Event	Heat		Semifinal		Final	
Athlete	Event	Time	Rank	Time	Rank	Time	Rank
Yu Ning Elaine Chan	50 m freestyle	27.48	47	Did not advance			
Wing Suet Sandy Chan	200 m butterfly	2:18.45	29	Did not advance			
Sze Hang Yu	200 m freestyle	2:07.55	39	Did not advance			
Sze Hang Yu	100 m butterfly	1:02.42	32	Did not advance			
Hiu Wai Sherry Tsai	100 m backstroke	1:04.25	30	Did not advance			
Hiu Wai Sherry Tsai	200 m backstroke	2:19.83	28	Did not advance			
Hannah Jane Arnett Wilson	100 m freestyle	57.33	34	Did not advance			
Tsz Wa Yvonne Yip	100 m breaststroke	1:14.53	39	Did not advance			

== Table tennis ==
Eight Hong Kong table tennis players qualified for the following events.

Men

Athlete	Event	Round 1	Round 2	Round 3	Round 4	Quarterfinals	Semifinals	Final / BM	
Athlete	Event	Opposition Result	Opposition Result	Opposition Result	Opposition Result	Opposition Result	Opposition Result	Opposition Result	Rank
Ko Lai Chak	Singles	Bye	Kamal (IND); W 4–0	Korbel (CZE); W 4–3	Persson (SWE); W 4–1	Wang Lq (CHN); L 1–4	Did not advance		
Leung Chu Yan	Singles	Bye	O Il (PRK); W 4–1	Maze (DEN); W 4–1	Samsonov (BLR); W 4–3	Ryu S-M (KOR); L 2–4	Did not advance		
Li Ching	Singles	Bye	Monteiro (BRA); W 4–1	Schlager (AUT); L 2–4	Did not advance				
Cheung Yuk; Leung Chu Yan	Doubles	—N/a	Bye		Mazunov / Smirnov (RUS); L 0–4	Did not advance			
Ko Lai Chak; Li Ching	Doubles	—N/a	Bye		Joo S-H / Oh S-E (KOR); W 4–1	Grujić / Karakašević (SCG); W 4–1	Mazunov / Smirnov (RUS); W 4–2	Chen Q / Ma L (CHN); L 2–4	2nd place, silver medalist(s)

Women

Athlete	Event	Round 1	Round 2	Round 3	Round 4	Quarterfinals	Semifinals	Final / BM	
Athlete	Event	Opposition Result	Opposition Result	Opposition Result	Opposition Result	Opposition Result	Opposition Result	Opposition Result	Rank
Lau Sui-fei	Singles	Bye		Ganina (RUS); W 4–2	Zhang Yn (CHN); L 1–4	Did not advance			
Lin Ling	Singles	Bye		Zamfir (ROM); L 2–4	Did not advance				
Tie Ya Na	Singles	Bye		Tóth (HUN); W 4–1	Kim H-H (PRK); W 4–1	Kim K-A (KOR); L 1–4	Did not advance		
Lau Sui-fei; Lin Ling	Doubles	Bye		Fadeyeva / Melnik (RUS); W 4–2	Fujinuma / Umemura (JPN); L 2–4	Did not advance			
Song Ah Sim; Tie Ya Na	Doubles	Bye			Ganina / Palina (RUS); W 4–0	Wang N / Zhang Yn (CHN); L 2–4	Did not advance		

== Triathlon ==
Hong Kong has qualified a single triathlete.

Athlete	Event	Swim (1.5 km)	Trans 1	Bike (40 km)	Trans 2	Run (10 km)	Total Time	Rank
Daniel Lee	Men's	18:17	0:19	1:05:38	0:19	39:35	2:03:30.39	43

== See also ==
- Hong Kong at the 2002 Asian Games
- Hong Kong at the 2004 Summer Paralympics
