= Hong Kong at the 2012 Summer Olympics =

- IOC code: HKG
- NOC: Sports Federation and Olympic Committee of Hong Kong, China
- Website: www.hkolympic.org (in Chinese and English)

in London
- Competitors: 42 in 13 sports
- Flag bearers: Lee Wai Sze (opening); Tang Peng (closing)
- Medals Ranked 79th: Gold 0 Silver 0 Bronze 1 Total 1

Summer Olympics appearances (overview)
- 1952; 1956; 1960; 1964; 1968; 1972; 1976; 1980; 1984; 1988; 1992; 1996; 2000; 2004; 2008; 2012; 2016; 2020; 2024; 2028

Hong Kong competed at the 2012 Summer Olympics in London, from 27 July to 12 August 2012. This was the territory's fifteenth appearance at the Olympics, having not attended the 1980 Summer Olympics in Moscow because of its support for the United States boycott.

The Sports Federation and Olympic Committee of Hong Kong, China sent a total of 42 athletes to the Games, 22 men and 20 women, to compete in 13 sports. This was also the youngest delegation in Hong Kong's Olympic history, with about half the team under the age of 25, and many of them were expected to reach their peak in time for the 2016 Summer Olympics in Rio de Janeiro. Eight Hong Kong athletes had competed in Beijing, including track and road cyclist Wong Kam Po, who competed at his fifth Olympic games as the oldest and most experienced athlete, at age 39. Three other athletes made their third Olympic appearance: swimmer Hannah Wilson, table tennis player Tie Ya Na, and single sculls rower So Sau Wah. Hong Kong also made its Olympic debut in men's sprint relay event, artistic gymnastics, and weightlifting.

Hong Kong left London with only a single Olympic medal, their third in history. Road and track cyclist Lee Wai Sze, who was the nation's flag bearer at the opening ceremony, won the bronze medal in the women's keirin event.

== Medallists ==
Medal	Name	Sport	Event	Date
Bronze	Lee Wai Sze	Cycling	Women's keirin	3 August

== Archery ==
Hong Kong has qualified one man.

Athlete	Event	Ranking round		Round of 64	Round of 32	Round of 16	Quarterfinals	Semifinals	Final / BM	
Athlete	Event	Score	Seed	Opposition Score	Opposition Score	Opposition Score	Opposition Score	Opposition Score	Opposition Score	Rank
Lee Kar Wai	Men's individual	637	60	Furukawa (JPN) (5); L 4–6	Did not advance					

== Athletics ==
Hong Kong has qualified one team of men's 4x100 relay, and one female sprinter.

Key

- Note – Ranks given for track events are within the athlete's heat only
- Q = Qualified for the next round
- q = Qualified for the next round as a fastest loser or, in field events, by position without achieving the qualifying target
- NR = National record
- N/A = Round not applicable for the event
- Bye = Athlete not required to compete in round

Men

Athlete	Event	Heat		Final	
Athlete	Event	Result	Rank	Result	Rank
Ho Man Lok; Lai Chun Ho; Ng Ka Fung; Tang Yik Chun; Tsui Chi Ho	4 × 100 m relay	38.61	8	Did not advance	

Women

Athlete	Event	Heat		Quarterfinal		Semifinal		Final	
Athlete	Event	Result	Rank	Result	Rank	Result	Rank	Result	Rank
Fong Yee Pui	100 m	12.02	2 Q	11.98	8	Did not advance			

== Badminton ==
Athlete	Event	Group Stage				Round of 16	Quarterfinal	Semifinal	Final / BM	
Athlete	Event	Opposition Score	Opposition Score	Opposition Score	Rank	Opposition Score	Opposition Score	Opposition Score	Opposition Score	Rank
Wong Wing Ki	Men's singles	Ekiring (UGA); W (21–10, 21–8)	Leverdez (FRA); W (21–11, 21–16)	—N/a	1 Q	Chen L (CHN); L (17–21, 17–21)	Did not advance			
Yip Pui Yin	Women's singles	Kværnø (NOR); W (21–8, 21–7)	Sung J-H (KOR); W (21–18, 23–21)	—N/a	1 Q	Pi (FRA); W (13–21, 21–12, 21–16)	Li Xr (CHN); L (12–21, 20–22)	Did not advance		
Poon Lok Yan; Tse Ying Suet	Women's doubles	Tian Q / Zhao Yl (CHN); L (11–21, 12–21)	Juhl / Pedersen (DEN); L (13–21, 21–14, 18–21)	Maeda / Suetsuna (JPN); L (15–21, 19–21)	4	—N/a	Did not advance			

Legend: Q=Qualified

== Cycling ==
=== Road ===
Athlete	Event	Time	Rank
Wong Kam Po	Men's road race	5:46:37	37
Wan Yiu Jamie Wong	Women's road race	OTL	

=== Track ===
Sprint

Athlete	Event	Qualification		Round 1	Repechage 1	Round 2	Repechage 2	Quarterfinals	Semifinals	Final	
Athlete	Event	Time Speed (km/h)	Rank	Opposition Time Speed (km/h)	Opposition Time Speed (km/h)	Opposition Time Speed (km/h)	Opposition Time Speed (km/h)	Opposition Time Speed (km/h)	Opposition Time Speed (km/h)	Opposition Time Speed (km/h)	Rank
Lee Wai Sze	Women's sprint	11.203; 64.268	7	Sullivan (CAN); W 11.300; 63.716	Bye	Guerra (CUB); L	Shulika (UKR); Kanis (NED); L	Did not advance		9th place final Kanis (NED); Sullivan (CAN); Hansen (NZL); L	10

Keirin

Athlete	Event	1st Round	Repechage	2nd Round	Final
Athlete	Event	Rank	Rank	Rank	Rank
Lee Wai Sze	Women's keirin	4 R	1 Q	3 Q	3rd place, bronze medalist(s)

Omnium

Athlete	Event	Flying lap		Points race		Elimination race	Individual pursuit		Scratch race	Time trial		Total points	Rank
Athlete	Event	Time	Rank	Race Points	Rank	Rank	Time	Rank	Rank	Time	Rank	Total points	Rank
Choi Ki Ho	Men's omnium	13.659	15	3	14	11	4:38.707	17	17	1:06.071	15	89	16

=== Mountain biking ===
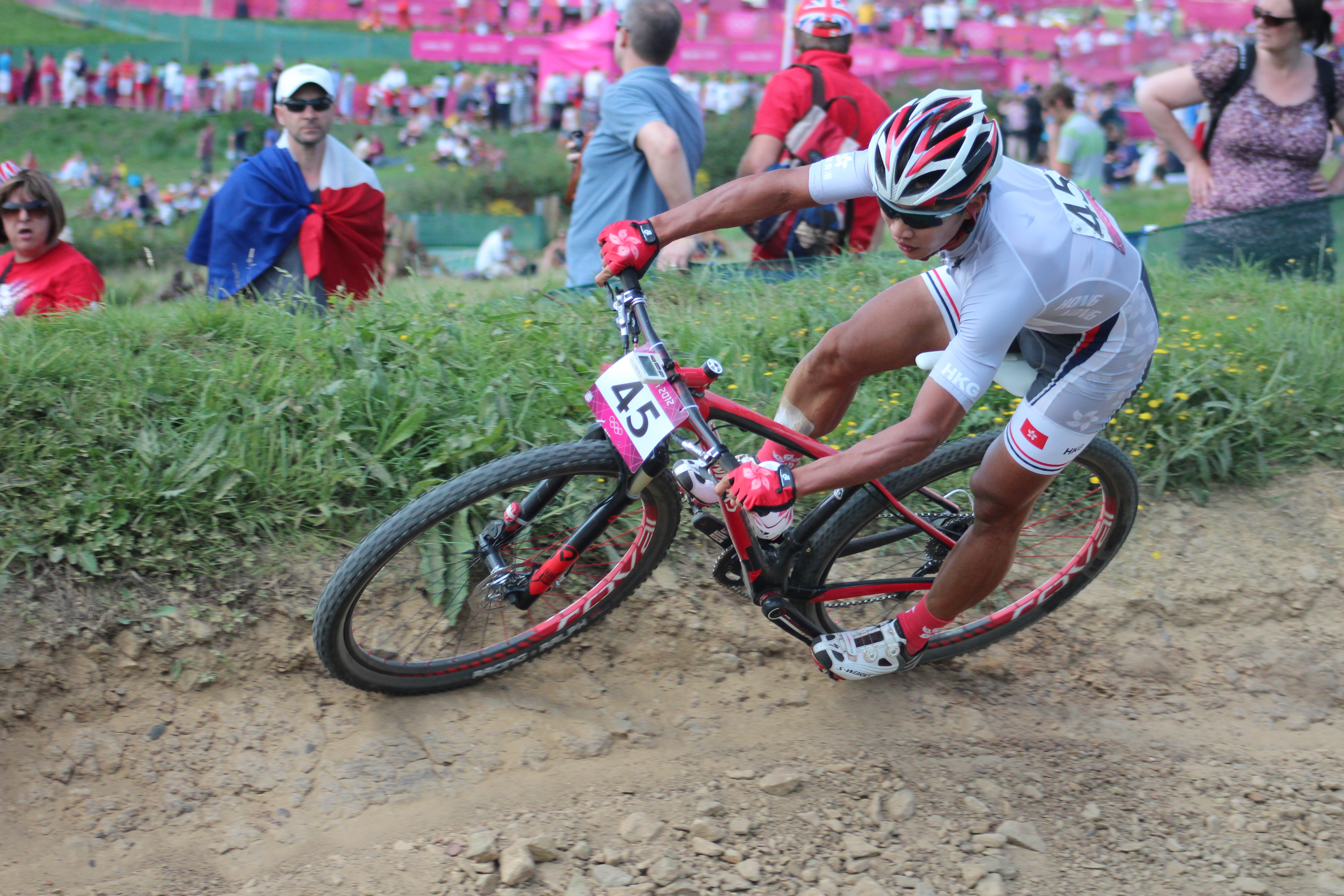
Chan Chun Hing in men's cross-country race

Athlete	Event	Time	Rank
Chan Chun Hing	Men's cross-country	1:41:59	38

== Fencing ==
Hong Kong has qualified 6 fencers.

Men

Athlete	Event	Round of 64	Round of 32	Round of 16	Quarterfinal	Semifinal	Final / BM	
Athlete	Event	Opposition Score	Opposition Score	Opposition Score	Opposition Score	Opposition Score	Opposition Score	Rank
Leung Ka Ming	Individual épée	—N/a	Pizzo (ITA); L 14–15	Did not advance				
Nicholas Edward Choi	Individual foil	Dărăban (ROU); L 8–15	Did not advance					
Lam Hin Chung	Individual sabre	Skrodzki (POL); L 10–15	Did not advance					

Women

Athlete	Event	Round of 64	Round of 32	Round of 16	Quarterfinal	Semifinal	Final / BM	
Athlete	Event	Opposition Score	Opposition Score	Opposition Score	Opposition Score	Opposition Score	Opposition Score	Rank
Yeung Chui Ling	Individual épée	Pantelyeyeva (UKR); L 10–15	Did not advance					
Lin Po Heung	Individual foil	Nishioka (JPN); L 10–13	Did not advance					
Au Sin Ying	Individual sabre	—N/a	Besbes (TUN); L 13–15	Did not advance				

== Gymnastics ==
=== Artistic ===
Men

Athlete	Event	Qualification								Final							
Athlete	Event	Apparatus						Total	Rank	Apparatus						Total	Rank
Athlete	Event	F	PH	R	V	PB	HB	Total	Rank	F	PH	R	V	PB	HB	Total	Rank
Shek Wai Hung	Floor	13.408	—N/a					13.408	63	Did not advance							
Shek Wai Hung	Pommel horse	—N/a	10.833	—N/a				10.833	68	Did not advance							
Shek Wai Hung	Vault	—N/a			15.466	—N/a		15.466	14	Did not advance							
Shek Wai Hung	Horizontal bar	—N/a					13.533	13.533	55	Did not advance							

Women

Athlete	Event	Qualification						Final					
Athlete	Event	Apparatus				Total	Rank	Apparatus				Total	Rank
Athlete	Event	F	V	UB	BB	Total	Rank	F	V	UB	BB	Total	Rank
Wong Hiu Ying Angel	All-around	12.800	13.533	11.866	11.466	49.765	52	Did not advance					

== Judo ==
Hong Kong has qualified 1 judoka

Athlete	Event	Round of 64	Round of 32	Round of 16	Quarterfinals	Semifinals	Repechage	Bronze Medal	Final	
Athlete	Event	Opposition Result	Opposition Result	Opposition Result	Opposition Result	Opposition Result	Opposition Result	Opposition Result	Opposition Result	Rank
Cheung Chi Yip	Men's −73 kg	Bye	Delpopolo (USA); L 0000–0020	Did not advance						

== Rowing ==
Hong Kong has qualified the following boats.

Men

Athlete	Event	Heats		Repechage		Quarterfinals		Semifinals		Final	
Athlete	Event	Time	Rank	Time	Rank	Time	Rank	Time	Rank	Time	Rank
So Sau Wah	Single sculls	7:15.91	6 R	7:13.35	3 SE/F	Bye		7:44.20	1 FE	7:29.35	25
Leung Chun Shek; Lok Kwan Hoi	Lightweight double sculls	6:59.52	5 R	6:47.04	4 SC/D	—N/a		7:13.67	3 FC	7:00:01	18

Qualification Legend: FA=Final A (medal); FB=Final B (non-medal); FC=Final C (non-medal); FD=Final D (non-medal); FE=Final E (non-medal); FF=Final F (non-medal); SA/B=Semifinals A/B; SC/D=Semifinals C/D; SE/F=Semifinals E/F; QF=Quarterfinals; R=Repechage

== Sailing ==
Hong Kong has qualified 1 boat for each of the following events

Men

Athlete	Event	Race											Net points	Final rank
Athlete	Event	1	2	3	4	5	6	7	8	9	10	M*	Net points	Final rank
Andy Leung	RS:X	11	18	~~28~~	12	15	10	13	9	16	21	EL	125	13

Women

Athlete	Event	Race											Net points	Final rank
Athlete	Event	1	2	3	4	5	6	7	8	9	10	M*	Net points	Final rank
Hayley Chan	RS:X	10	8	9	13	12	~~15~~	11	11	8	14	EL	96	12

M = Medal race; EL = Eliminated – did not advance into the medal race;

== Shooting ==
Women

Athlete	Event	Qualification		Final	
Athlete	Event	Points	Rank	Points	Rank
Ip Pui Yi	10 m air pistol	346	49	Did not advance	

== Swimming ==
Swimmers have so far achieved qualifying standards in the following events (up to a maximum of 2 swimmers in each event at the Olympic Qualifying Time (OQT), and potentially 1 at the Olympic Selection Time (OST)):

Women

Athlete	Event	Heat		Semifinal		Final	
Athlete	Event	Time	Rank	Time	Rank	Time	Rank
Stephanie Au	100 m backstroke	1:04.31	39	Did not advance			
Stephanie Au	200 m backstroke	2:18.47	36	Did not advance			
Sze Hang Yu	200 m freestyle	1:59.92	23	Did not advance			
Natasha Tang	10 km open water	—N/a				2:02:33.4	20
Hannah Wilson	100 m freestyle	55.33	21	Did not advance			
Hannah Wilson	100 m butterfly	59.59	30	Did not advance			

== Table tennis ==
Hong Kong has qualified four athletes for singles table tennis events. Based on their world rankings as of 16 May 2011 Tang Peng and Jiang Tianyi have qualified for the men's event; Tie Ya Na and Jiang Huajun have qualified for the women's.

Men

Athlete	Event	Preliminary round	Round 1	Round 2	Round 3	Round 4	Quarterfinals	Semifinals	Final / BM	
Athlete	Event	Opposition Result	Opposition Result	Opposition Result	Opposition Result	Opposition Result	Opposition Result	Opposition Result	Opposition Result	Rank
Jiang Tianyi	Singles	Bye			Smirnov (RUS); W (4–1)	Kim H-B (PRK); W (4–3)	Zhang J (CHN); L (1–4)	Did not advance		
Tang Peng	Singles	Bye		Alamiyan (IRI); L (3–4)	Did not advance					
Jiang Tianyi; Leung Chu Yan; Tang Peng	Team	—N/a				Brazil; W (3–0)	Japan; W (3–2)	South Korea; L (0–3)	Germany; L (1–3)	4

Women

Athlete	Event	Preliminary round	Round 1	Round 2	Round 3	Round 4	Quarterfinals	Semifinals	Final / BM	
Athlete	Event	Opposition Result	Opposition Result	Opposition Result	Opposition Result	Opposition Result	Opposition Result	Opposition Result	Opposition Result	Rank
Jiang Huajun	Singles	Bye			Kim J (PRK); W (4–2)	Ding N (CHN); L (1–4)	Did not advance			
Tie Ya Na	Singles	Bye			Samara (ROU); L (2–4)	Did not advance				
Jiang Huajun; Lee Ho Ching; Tie Ya Na	Team	—N/a				Austria; W (3–1)	South Korea; L (0–3)	Did not advance		

== Weightlifting ==
Hong Kong has qualified one athlete.

Athlete	Event	Snatch		Clean & Jerk		Total	Rank
Athlete	Event	Result	Rank	Result	Rank	Total	Rank
Yu Weili	Women's −53 kg	90	6	105	13	195	9
