= Hong Kong at the 2020 Summer Olympics =

- IOC code: HKG
- NOC: Sports Federation and Olympic Committee of Hong Kong, China
- Website: www.hkolympic.org (in Chinese and English)

in Tokyo, Japan July 23, 2021 – August 8, 2021
- Competitors: 46 in 13 sports
- Flag bearers (opening): Tse Ying Suet; Cheung Ka Long
- Flag bearer (closing): Grace Lau
- Medals Ranked 49th: Gold 1 Silver 2 Bronze 3 Total 6

Summer Olympics appearances (overview)
- 1952; 1956; 1960; 1964; 1968; 1972; 1976; 1980; 1984; 1988; 1992; 1996; 2000; 2004; 2008; 2012; 2016; 2020; 2024; 2028

Hong Kong competed at the 2020 Summer Olympics in Tokyo, Japan, marking the territory's seventeenth appearance at the Summer Olympics since its debut as a British colony in 1952. More medals were won at the 2020 Summer Olympics by athletes representing Hong Kong than ever before, and Hong Kong also won its first gold medal since the handover back to China.

== Medalists ==
Medal	Name	Sport	Event	Date
Gold	Cheung Ka Long	Fencing	Men's foil	26 July
Silver	Siobhan Haughey	Swimming	Women's 200 m freestyle	28 July
Silver	Siobhan Haughey	Swimming	Women's 100 m freestyle	30 July
Bronze	Doo Hoi Kem; Lee Ho Ching; Minnie Soo Wai Yam	Table tennis	Women's team	5 August
Bronze	Grace Lau	Karate	Women's kata	5 August
Bronze	Lee Wai Sze	Cycling	Women's Sprint	8 August

== Competitors ==
The following list specifies the number of competitors for Hong Kong in each sport.

Sport	Men	Women	Total
Athletics	1	1	2
Badminton	2	2	4
Cycling	1	5	6
Equestrian	1	0	1
Fencing	4	4	8
Golf	0	1	1
Gymnastics	1	0	1
Karate	0	1	1
Rowing	0	1	1
Sailing	1	2	3
Swimming	2	7	9
Table tennis	4	4	8
Triathlon	1	0	1
Total	18	28	46

== Athletics ==
Hong Kong received a male universality slot from IAAF to send one athlete to the Olympics, while one female athlete qualified by world ranking.

Key

- Note–Ranks given for track events are within the athlete's heat only
- Q = Qualified for the next round
- q = Qualified for the next round as a fastest loser or, in field events, by position without achieving the qualifying target
- NR = National record
- N/A = Round not applicable for the event
- Bye = Athlete not required to compete in round

Track & road events

Athlete	Event	Heat		Semifinal		Final	
Athlete	Event	Result	Rank	Result	Rank	Result	Rank
Chan Chung Wang	Men's 110 m hurdles	14.23	8	Did not advance			
Ching Siu Nga	Women's 20 km walk	—N/a				1:37:53	35

== Badminton ==
Hong Kong entered four badminton players for each of the following events into the Olympic tournament based on the BWF World Race to Tokyo Rankings: one entry each in the men's and women's singles and a pair in the mixed doubles.

Athlete	Event	Group stage				Elimination	Quarterfinal	Semifinal	Final / BM	
Athlete	Event	Opposition Score	Opposition Score	Opposition Score	Rank	Opposition Score	Opposition Score	Opposition Score	Opposition Score	Rank
Ng Ka Long	Men's singles	Muñoz (MEX); W (21–9, 21–10)	Cordón (GUA); L (20–22, 13–21)	—N/a	2	Did not advance				
Cheung Ngan Yi	Women's singles	Polikarpova (ISR); W (21–15, 15–21, 21–16)	Sindhu (IND); L (9–21, 16–21)	—N/a	2	Did not advance				
Tang Chun Man; Tse Ying Suet	Mixed doubles	Chan / Goh (MAS); W (21–18, 10–21, 21–16)	Wang Yy / Huang Dp (CHN); L (12–21, 18–21)	Lamsfuß / Herttrich (GER); W (22–20, 20–22, 21–16)	2 Q	—N/a	Ellis / Smith (GBR); W (21–13, 21–18)	Zheng Sw / Huang Yq (CHN); L (16–21, 12–21)	Watanabe / Higashino (JPN); L (17–21, 21–23)	4

== Cycling ==
=== Road ===
Hong Kong received a spare berth freed up by host nation Japan to send one rider to the men's Olympic road race, as the highest-ranked nation for men, not yet qualified, in the UCI World Ranking.

Athlete	Event	Time	Rank
Choy Hiu Fung	Men's road race	Did not finish	

=== Track ===
Following the completion of the 2020 UCI Track Cycling World Championships, Hong Kong riders obtained spots in the women's omnium and women's madison, as well as the women's sprint and keirin, based on their country's results in the final UCI Olympic rankings.

Sprint

Athlete	Event	Qualification		Round 1	Repechage 1	Round 2	Repechage 2	Round 3	Repechage 3	Quarterfinals	Semifinals	Final	
Athlete	Event	Time Speed (km/h)	Rank	Opposition Time Speed (km/h)	Opposition Time Speed (km/h)	Opposition Time Speed (km/h)	Opposition Time Speed (km/h)	Opposition Time Speed (km/h)	Opposition Time Speed (km/h)	Opposition Time Speed (km/h)	Opposition Time Speed (km/h)	Opposition Time Speed (km/h)	Rank
Lee Hoi Yan	Women's sprint	11.232; 64.103	28	Did not advance									
Lee Wai Sze	Women's sprint	10.538; 68.324	9 Q	Krupeckaitė (LTU); W 11.196; 64.309	Bye	Marchant (GBR); L	Godby (USA); W 11.402; 63.147	Gros (FRA); W 11.201; 64.280	Bye	Marchant (GBR); W 10.861; W 10.958	Starikova (UKR); L, L	Hinze (GER); W 11.110; W 11.283	3rd place, bronze medalist(s)

Keirin

Athlete	Event	1st Round	Repechage	2nd Round	3rd Round	Final
Athlete	Event	Rank	Rank	Rank	Rank	Rank
Lee Hoi Yan	Women's keirin	4	4	Did not advance		
Lee Wai Sze	Women's keirin	3	1	1	5	8

Omnium

Athlete	Event	Scratch race		Tempo race		Elimination race		Points race		Total points	Rank
Athlete	Event	Rank	Points	Rank	Points	Rank	Points	Points	Rank	Total points	Rank
Pang Yao	Women's omnium	DNF	16	19	4	16	10	0	DNF	−40	DNF

Madison

Athlete	Event	Points	Laps	Rank
Leung Bo Yee; Pang Yao	Women's madison	0	−40	13

== Equestrian ==
Hong Kong entered one eventing rider into the Olympic equestrian competition for the first time in 12 years and finished in the top two, outside the group selection, of the individual FEI Olympic Rankings for Group G (Southeast Asia and Oceania).

=== Eventing ===
Athlete	Horse	Event	Dressage		Cross-country			Jumping						Total	
Athlete	Horse	Event	Dressage		Cross-country			Qualifier			Final			Total	
Athlete	Horse	Event	Penalties	Rank	Penalties	Total	Rank	Penalties	Total	Rank	Penalties	Total	Rank	Penalties	Rank
Thomas Heffernan Ho	Tayberry	Individual	46.70	61	55.60	102.30	48	17.20	119.50	42	Did not advance			119.50	42

== Fencing ==
For the first time since Seoul 1988, Hong Kong fencers entered a full squad in the men's team foil and women's team épée as the highest-ranked nation from Asia outside the world's top four in the FIE Olympic Team Rankings.

Athlete	Event	Round of 64	Round of 32	Round of 16	Quarterfinal	Semifinal	Final / BM	
Athlete	Event	Opposition Score	Opposition Score	Opposition Score	Opposition Score	Opposition Score	Opposition Score	Rank
Cheung Ka Long	Men's foil	Bye	Mertine (FRA); W 15–12	Foconi (ITA); W 15–3	Borodachev (ROC); W 15–14	Choupenitch (CZE); W 15–10	Garozzo (ITA); W 15–11	1st place, gold medalist(s)
Cheung Siu Lun	Men's foil	Sanità (GER); L 14–15	Did not advance					
Ryan Choi	Men's foil	Bye	Van Haaster (CAN); W 15–10	Shikine (JPN); L 6–15	Did not advance			
Cheung Ka Long; Cheung Siu Lun; Ryan Choi; Lawrence Ng Lok Wang	Men's team foil	—N/a		Bye	ROC; L 39–45	Classification semifinal Germany; L 39–45	Seventh place final Egypt; W 45–21	7
Kaylin Hsieh	Women's épée	Murtazaeva (ROC); L 7–14	Did not advance					
Vivian Kong	Women's épée	Bye	Doig (PER); W 15–11	Knapik-Miazga (POL); W 15–8	Murtazaeva (ROC); L 10–15	Did not advance		
Coco Lin	Women's épée	Tikanah (SGP); L 11–15	Did not advance					
Vivian Kong; Kaylin Hsieh; Coco Lin; Chu Ka Mong	Women's team épée	—N/a			China; L 32–44	Classification semifinal United States; L 31–42	Seventh place final ROC; W 28–27	7

== Golf ==
Hong Kong entered one female golfer into the Olympic tournament. Tiffany Chan qualified directly among the top 60 eligible players for the women's event based on the IGF World Rankings of 29 June 2021.

Athlete	Event	Round 1	Round 2	Round 3	Round 4	Total		
Athlete	Event	Score	Score	Score	Score	Score	Par	Rank
Tiffany Chan	Women's	77	74	69	70	290	+6	=50

== Gymnastics ==
=== Artistic ===
Hong Kong entered one artistic gymnast into the Olympic competition, London 2012 Olympian Shek Wai Hung who secured one of the three spots available for individual-based gymnasts but did not qualify for the team, the all-around, or the vault exercise at the 2019 World Championships in Stuttgart, Germany.

Men

Athlete	Event	Qualification								Final							
Athlete	Event	Apparatus						Total	Rank	Apparatus						Total	Rank
Athlete	Event	F	PH	R	V	PB	HB	Total	Rank	F	PH	R	V	PB	HB	Total	Rank
Shek Wai Hung	Vault	—N/a			14.274	—N/a		14.274	12	Did not advance							

== Karate ==
Hong Kong entered one karateka into the inaugural Olympic tournament. 2018 world bronze medalist Grace Lau qualified directly for the women's kata category by finishing among the top four karatekas at the end of the combined WKF Olympic Rankings.

Athlete	Event	Elimination round		Ranking round		Final / BM	
Athlete	Event	Score	Rank	Score	Rank	Opposition Result	Rank
Grace Lau	Women's kata	26.15	2 Q	26.40	2 Q	Bozan (TUR); W 26.94–26.52	3rd place, bronze medalist(s)

== Rowing ==
Hong Kong qualified one boat in the women's single sculls for the Games by finishing first in the B-final and securing the fourth of five berths available at the 2021 FISA Asia & Oceania Olympic Qualification Regatta in Tokyo, Japan.

Athlete	Event	Heats		Repechage		Quarterfinals		Semifinals		Final	
Athlete	Event	Time	Rank	Time	Rank	Time	Rank	Time	Rank	Time	Rank
Winne Hung	Women's single sculls	8:17.79	4 R	8:23.58	2 QF	8:36.37	6 SC/D	7:56.30	6 FD	8:02.79	23

Qualification Legend: FA=Final A (medal); FB=Final B (non-medal); FC=Final C (non-medal); FD=Final D (non-medal); FE=Final E (non-medal); FF=Final F (non-medal); SA/B=Semifinals A/B; SC/D=Semifinals C/D; SE/F=Semifinals E/F; QF=Quarterfinals; R=Repechage

== Sailing ==
Hong Kong sailors qualified for one boat in each of the following classes through the class-associated World Championships and the continental regattas.

Athlete	Event	Race													Net points	Final rank
Athlete	Event	1	2	3	4	5	6	7	8	9	10	11	12	M*	Net points	Final rank
Michael Cheng	Men's RS:X	3	8	8	12	8	9	13	~~22~~	15	15	15	13	EL	119	13
Hayley Chan	Women's RS:X	12	8	13	5	7	6	8	~~14~~	7	4	8	3	14	95	8
Stephanie Norton	Women's Laser Radial	29	35	37	22	37	33	33	37	41	~~42~~	—N/a		EL	304	39

M = Medal race; EL = Eliminated – did not advance into the medal race; † – Discarded race not counted in the overall result

== Swimming ==
Hong Kong swimmers further achieved qualifying standards in the following events (up to a maximum of 2 swimmers in each event at the Olympic Qualifying Time (OQT), and potentially 1 at the Olympic Selection Time (OST)):

Athlete	Event	Heat		Semifinal		Final	
Athlete	Event	Time	Rank	Time	Rank	Time	Rank
Ian Ho	Men's 50 m freestyle	22.45	32	Did not advance			
Ian Ho	Men's 100 m freestyle	49.49	34	Did not advance			
William Yan Thorley	Men's 10 km open water	—N/a				1:58:33.40	22
Stephanie Au	Women's 100 m backstroke	1:01.07	26	Did not advance			
Siobhán Haughey	Women's 50 m freestyle	24.75	15 Q	DNS		Did not advance	
Siobhán Haughey	Women's 100 m freestyle	52.70 AS	2 Q	52.40 AS	2 Q	52.27 AS	2nd place, silver medalist(s)
Siobhán Haughey	Women's 200 m freestyle	1:56.48	8 Q	1:55.16	2 Q	1:53.92 AS	2nd place, silver medalist(s)
Camille Cheng; Stephanie Au; Ho Nam Wai; Tam Hoi Lam	Women's 4 × 100 m freestyle relay	3:43.52	15	—N/a		Did not advance	
Camille Cheng; Siobhán Haughey; Toto Wong; Jamie Yeung	Women's 4 × 100 m medley relay	4:02.86	13	—N/a		Did not advance	

== Table tennis ==
Hong Kong entered six athletes into the table tennis competition at the Games, with an additional two alternate athletes for the team tournaments. The men's and women's teams secured one of nine available places, respectively, at the 2020 World Olympic Qualification Event in Gondomar, Portugal, permitting a maximum of two starters to compete in each of the men's and women's singles tournament. Moreover, an additional berth was awarded to the Hong Kong table tennis players competing in the inaugural mixed doubles by advancing to the semifinal stage of the 2019 ITTF World Tour Grand Finals in Zhengzhou, China.

Men

Athlete	Event	Preliminary	Round 1	Round 2	Round 3	Round of 16	Quarterfinals	Semifinals	Final / BM	
Athlete	Event	Opposition Result	Opposition Result	Opposition Result	Opposition Result	Opposition Result	Opposition Result	Opposition Result	Opposition Result	Rank
Lam Siu Hang	Singles	Bye	Afanador (PUR); W 4–3	Gnanasekaran (IND); W 4–3	Harimoto (JPN); L 1–4	Did not advance				
Wong Chun Ting	Singles	Bye			Chuang C-y (TPE); L 1–4	Did not advance				
Ho Kwan Kit; Lam Siu Hang; Wong Chun Ting	Team	—N/a				France; L 0–3	Did not advance			

Women

Athlete	Event	Preliminary	Round 1	Round 2	Round 3	Round of 16	Quarterfinals	Semifinals	Final / BM	
Athlete	Event	Opposition Result	Opposition Result	Opposition Result	Opposition Result	Opposition Result	Opposition Result	Opposition Result	Opposition Result	Rank
Doo Hoi Kem	Singles	Bye			Shin Y-b (KOR); W 4–2	Eerland (NED); W 4–1	Chen M (CHN); L 2–4	Did not advance		
Minnie Soo Wai Yam	Singles	Bye		Xiao (ESP); L 2–4	Did not advance					
Doo Hoi Kem; Lee Ho Ching; Minnie Soo Wai Yam	Team	—N/a				Brazil; W 3–1	Romania; W 3–1	Japan; L 0–3	Germany; W 3–1	3rd place, bronze medalist(s)

Mixed

Athlete	Event	Round of 16	Quarterfinals	Semifinals	Final / BM	
Athlete	Event	Opposition Result	Opposition Result	Opposition Result	Opposition Result	Rank
Wong Chun Ting; Doo Hoi Kem	Doubles	Szudi / Pergel (HUN); W 4–0	Lebesson / Yuan (FRA); L 3–4	Did not advance		

== Triathlon ==
Hong Kong entered one triathlete to compete at the Games for the first time since the 2008. British-born Oscar Coggins secured a place in the men's event by topping the list of individual triathletes from Asia and Oceania vying for qualification based on the ITU World Rankings.

Athlete	Event	Time						Rank
Athlete	Event	Swim (1.5 km)	Trans 1	Bike (40 km)	Trans 2	Run (10 km)	Total	Rank
Oscar Coggins	Men's	17:54	0:41	56:29	0:28	33:23	1:48:55	33
