= Chan Kam Hong =

Hong Kong swimmer

Personal information
- Native name
- Traditional Chinese: 陳錦康
- Simplified Chinese: 陈锦康
Transcriptions
Standard Mandarin
- Hanyu Pinyin: Chén Jǐnkāng
- Wade–Giles: Chen2 Chin3 K'ang1
Yue: Cantonese
- Jyutping: Can4 Gam2 Hong1
- Born: 29 July 1946 (age 79)

Sport
- Sport: Swimming

Chan Kam Hong (traditional Chinese: 陳錦康; simplified Chinese: 陈锦康; born 29 July 1946) is a Hong Kong former swimmer. He competed in the men's 200 metre backstroke at the 1964 Summer Olympics. During his swimming career, Chan set multiple Hong Kong swimming records in backstroke. He retired from competitive swimming in 1968.

== Career ==
Chan attended New Method College. He competed on behalf of his school at the 1961 swimming gala put on by the Hongkong Schools Sports Association at Victoria Park Pool. In the "B" grade boys division, he placed first in both the 50 metres backstroke and 100 metres backstroke events. During junior events held in 1962, he won the 100 metre and 200 metre backstroke competitions. In 1963, at the 16th annual Chinese Swimming Competition (Chinese: 華人泳賽), Chan set the Hong Kong record in the 200 metre backstroke with a time of 2 minutes and 47 seconds.

When he competed at the 1964 Summer Olympics in Japan, Chan was a member of the Fortuna Swimming Club and was coached by the Olympic swimmer Wan Shiu Ming. At the time of the Olympics, he had swum the 200 metre backstroke in 2 minutes and 52.2 seconds and was the Hong Kong recordholder in the event. In preparation for the Olympics, Chan trained at the Yoyogi National Gymnasium's pool. He competed in the fourth heat of the men's 200 metre backstroke and placed in the seventh and last place with a time of 2 minutes and 46.0 seconds.

During the 1966 Chinese Amateur Swimming Championships at the Victoria Park Pool, Chan swam 2 minutes and 46.0 seconds, winning the 200 metre backstroke and setting a Hong Kong record. The time was 0.1 seconds below the required time to qualify for the event at the 1966 Asian Games. He competed at the 1967 Colony Swimming Championships at the Victoria Park Pool. Chan set a Hong Kong record in the 200 metre backstroke with a time of 2 minutes and 45.5 seconds. At the time, he was working as a bank teller. Chan placed second at the 1968 Colony Championship in the 200 metre backstroke behind Ronnie Wong. After competing at the event, he said he would retire following the cross-harbour swimming competition on 22 September. Regarding his decision to retire to focus on his work as a bank teller, Chan said, "My job is too demanding and leaves me hardly any time for training."
