= Hong Kong at the 2024 Summer Olympics =

- IOC code: HKG
- NOC: Sports Federation and Olympic Committee of Hong Kong, China
- Website: www.hkolympic.org (in Chinese and English)

in Paris, France 26 July 2024 – 11 August 2024
- Competitors: 34 (16 men and 18 women) in 12 sports
- Flag bearers (opening): Cheung Ka Long & Siobhán Haughey
- Flag bearers (closing): Lee Sze Wing & Lo Wai Fung
- Medals Ranked 37th: Gold 2 Silver 0 Bronze 2 Total 4

Summer Olympics appearances (overview)
- 1952; 1956; 1960; 1964; 1968; 1972; 1976; 1980; 1984; 1988; 1992; 1996; 2000; 2004; 2008; 2012; 2016; 2020; 2024

Hong Kong, competing as "Hong Kong, China" competed at the 2024 Summer Olympics in Paris from 26 July to 11 August 2024. It was the territory's eighteenth appearance at the Summer Olympics since its debut as a British colony in 1952, except Moscow 1980 as part of US led boycott, and the seventh appearance at the Summer Olympics since the sovereignty of Hong Kong was returned to the People's Republic of China (PRC) in 1997.

== Medalists ==
Medal	Name	Sport	Event	Date
Gold	Vivian Kong	Fencing	Women's épée	27 July
Gold	Cheung Ka Long	Fencing	Men's foil	29 July
Bronze	Siobhán Haughey	Swimming	Women's 200 m freestyle	29 July
Bronze	Siobhán Haughey	Swimming	Women's 100 m freestyle	31 July

Medals by sport
Sport	1st place, gold medalist(s)	2nd place, silver medalist(s)	3rd place, bronze medalist(s)	Total
Fencing	2	0	0	2
Swimming	0	0	2	2
Total	2	0	2	4

Medals by gender
Gender	1st place, gold medalist(s)	2nd place, silver medalist(s)	3rd place, bronze medalist(s)	Total
Female	1	0	2	3
Male	1	0	0	1
Mixed	0	0	0	0
Total	2	0	2	4

Medals by date
Date	1st place, gold medalist(s)	2nd place, silver medalist(s)	3rd place, bronze medalist(s)	Total
27 July	1	0	0	1
29 July	1	0	1	2
31 July	0	0	1	1
Total	2	0	2	4

Multiple medalists
Name	Sport	1st place, gold medalist(s)	2nd place, silver medalist(s)	3rd place, bronze medalist(s)	Total
Siobhán Haughey	Swimming	0	0	2	2

== Competitors ==
The following is the list of number of competitors in the Games.

Sport	Men	Women	Total
Athletics	1	0	1
Badminton	2	4	6
Cycling	1	1	2
Fencing	2	2	4
Gymnastics	1	0	1
Judo	0	1	1
Rowing	1	0	1
Sailing	4	1	5
Swimming	1	6	7
Table Tennis	1	3	4
Taekwondo	1	0	1
Triathlon	1	0	1
Total	16	18	34

== Athletics ==
Hong Kong sent one sprinter to compete at the 2024 Summer Olympics.

Key

- Note–Ranks given for track events are within the athlete's heat only
- Q = Qualified for the next round
- q = Qualified for the next round as a fastest loser or, in field events, by position without achieving the qualifying target
- NR = National record
- N/A = Round not applicable for the event
- Bye = Athlete not required to compete in round

Track events

Athlete	Event	Preliminary		Heat		Semifinal		Final	
Athlete	Event	Result	Rank	Result	Rank	Result	Rank	Result	Rank
Felix Diu	Men's 100 m	10.62	4	Did not advance					

== Badminton ==
Hong Kong entered six badminton players into the Olympic tournament based on the BWF Race to Paris Rankings.

Athlete	Event	Group stage				Round of 16	Quarter-final	Semi-final	Final / BM	
Athlete	Event	Opposition Score	Opposition Score	Opposition Score	Rank	Opposition Score	Opposition Score	Opposition Score	Opposition Score	Rank
Lee Cheuk Yiu	Men's singles	Garrido (MEX); W (21–5, 15–21, 21–17)	Chou (TPE); L (18–21, 13–21)	—N/a	2	Did not advance				
Lo Sin Yan	Women's singles	Vieira (BRA); L (19–21, 14–21)	Katethong (THA); L (14–21, 9–21)	—N/a	3	Did not advance				
Yeung Nga Ting; Yeung Pui Lam	Women's doubles	Stoeva / Stoeva (BUL); L (11–21, 23–21, 15–21)	A. Xu / K. Xu (USA); W (24–22, 17–21, 21–12)	Liu / Tan (CHN); L (18–21, 15–21)	3	—N/a	Did not advance			
Tang Chun Man; Tse Ying Suet	Mixed doubles	Ye / Lee (TPE); W (21–13, 21–13)	Watanabe / Higashino (JPN); L (17–21, 21–14, 18–21)	Christiansen / Bøje (DEN); W W/O	2 Q	—N/a	Seo S-j / Chae Y-j (KOR); L (15–21, 10–21)	Did not advance		

== Cycling ==
=== Road ===
Hong Kong entered one male and one female rider to compete in the road race events at the Olympic, after secured those quota through the UCI Nation Ranking and 2023 Asian Championships in Rayong, Thailand.

Athlete	Event	Time	Rank
Lau Wan Yau	Men's road race	DNF	
Lee Sze Wing	Women's road race	4:10:47	64

=== Track ===
Hong Kong entered one rider to compete in the women's omnium events, based on the nations performances, through the final UCI Olympic rankings.

Omnium

Athlete	Event	Scratch race		Tempo race		Elimination race		Points race		Total	
Athlete	Event	Rank	Points	Rank	Points	Rank	Points	Rank	Points	Rank	Points
Lee Sze Wing	Women's omnium	19	4	13	16	18	6	19	0	20	26

== Fencing ==
Hong Kong entered four fencers into the Olympic competition. Tokyo 2020 gold medalist, Cheung Ka Long, Daphne Chan and Vivian Kong secured their quota places in their respective events, after nominated as one of two highest ranked individual fencers, eligible for Asia & Oceania zone through the release of the FIE Official ranking for Paris 2024. Later on, Ho Wai Hang, qualified himself for the games, following the triumph of winning the gold medal in men's épée, at the 2024 Asian & Oceania Zonal Qualifying Tournament in Dubai, United Arab Emirates.

Athlete	Event	Round of 64	Round of 32	Round of 16	Quarterfinal	Semifinal	Final / BM	
Athlete	Event	Opposition Score	Opposition Score	Opposition Score	Opposition Score	Opposition Score	Opposition Score	Rank
Ho Wai Hang	Men's épée	Bye	Yamada (JPN); L 9–15	Did not advance				
Cheung Ka Long	Men's foil	Bye	Gu (CAN); W 15–5	Mo (CHN); W 15–10	Lefort (FRA); W 15–14	Iimura (JPN); W 15–11	Macchi (ITA); W 15–14	1st place, gold medalist(s)
Vivian Kong	Women's épée	Bye	Hussein (EGY); W 15–11	Husisian (USA); W 15–12	Kryvytska (UKR); W 15–7	Differt (EST); W 15–11	Mallo-Breton (FRA); W 13–12	1st place, gold medalist(s)
Daphne Chan	Women's foil	Bye	Azuma (JPN); W 15–14	Sauer (GER); L 8–15	Did not advance			

== Gymnastics ==
=== Artistic ===
Hong Kong entered one gymnasts into the games. Shek Wai Hung directly secured his quota to compete at the Olympics by being one of the highest-ranked eligible athlete in the men's vault, through the final accumulations of the 2024 Apparatus World Cup Series rankings.

Men

Athlete	Event	Qualification								Final							
Athlete	Event	Apparatus						Total	Rank	Apparatus						Total	Rank
Athlete	Event	F	PH	R	V	PB	HB	Total	Rank	F	PH	R	V	PB	HB	Total	Rank
Shek Wai Hung	Men's Vault	—N/a			14.099	—N/a		14.099	14	Did not advance							

== Judo ==
For the first time since the nation's last participation at London 2012, Hong Kong qualified one judoka for the following weight class at the Games. Wong Ka Lee (women's extra-lightweight, 48 kg) got qualified via continental quota based on Olympic point rankings.

Athlete	Event	Round of 32	Round of 16	Quarterfinals	Semifinals	Repechage	Final / BM	
Athlete	Event	Opposition Result	Opposition Result	Opposition Result	Opposition Result	Opposition Result	Opposition Result	Rank
Wong Ka Lee	Women's –48 kg	Tanzer (AUT); L 00–10	Did not advance					

== Rowing ==
Hong Kong rowers qualified one boats in the men's single sculls for the Games, through the 2024 Asia & Oceania Qualification Regatta in Chungju, South Korea.

Athlete	Event	Heats		Repechage		Quarterfinals		Semifinals		Final	
Athlete	Event	Time	Rank	Time	Rank	Time	Rank	Time	Rank	Time	Rank
Chiu Hin Chun	Men's single sculls	7:00.29	4 R	7:12.94	2 Q	7:13.70	6 SC/D	7:03.68	5 FD	6:56.65	20

Qualification Legend: FA=Final A (medal); FB=Final B (non-medal); FC=Final C (non-medal); FD=Final D (non-medal); FE=Final E (non-medal); FF=Final F (non-medal); SA/B=Semifinals A/B; SC/D=Semifinals C/D; SE/F=Semifinals E/F; QF=Quarterfinals; R=Repechage

== Sailing ==
Hong Kong sailors qualified one boat in each of the following classes through the 2022 Asian Games in Hangzhou, China, 2023 Asian Championships in Chon Buri, Thailand and the 2024 Semaine Olympique Française (Last Chance Regatta) in Hyères, France. This is the first time Hong Kong sailors have qualified for the 49er class.

Elimination events

Athlete	Event	Opening race																						Quarter Final	Semi Final	Final	Final rank
Athlete	Event	1	2	3	4	5	6	7	8	9	10	11	12	13	14	15	16	17	18	19	20	Net points	Rank	Rank	Rank	Rank	Final rank
Ma Kwan Ching	Women's IQFoil	6	5	15	5	10	17	18	7	~~21~~	17	14	~~25~~	15	10	—N/a						139	14	Did not advance			
Cheng Ching Yin	Men's IQFoil	~~20~~	14	7	~~25~~	14	9	1	10	7	5	5	19	15	—N/a							106	13	Did not advance			

Medal race events

Athlete	Event	Race																Net points	Final rank
Athlete	Event	1	2	3	4	5	6	7	8	9	10	11	12	13	14	15	M*	Net points	Final rank
Akira Sakai; Russell Alysworth	Men's 49er	17	12	19	19	14	12	~~20~~	20	14	18	9	18	—N/a			EL	172	20
Nicholas Halliday	Men's ILCA7	~~35~~	14	35	16	18	6	15	32	—N/a							EL	136	24

M = Medal race; EL = Eliminated – did not advance into the medal race

== Swimming ==
Hong Kong swimmers achieved the entry standards in the following events for Paris 2024 (a maximum of two swimmers under the Olympic Qualifying Time (OST) and potentially at the Olympic Consideration Time (OCT)):

Athlete	Event	Heat		Semifinal		Final	
Athlete	Event	Time	Rank	Time	Rank	Time	Rank
Ian Ho	Men's 50 m freestyle	22.12	24=	Did not advance			
Ian Ho	Men's 100 m freestyle	51.46	55	Did not advance			
Cindy Cheung	Women's 100 m backstroke	1:03.45	29	Did not advance			
Cindy Cheung	Women's 200 m backstroke	2:17.32	26	Did not advance			
Siobhán Haughey	Women's 100 m freestyle	53.02	2 Q	52.64	1 Q	52.33	3rd place, bronze medalist(s)
Siobhán Haughey	Women's 200 m freestyle	1:56.38	5 Q	1:55.51	4 Q	1:54.55	3rd place, bronze medalist(s)
Tam Hoi Lam; Camille Cheng; Stephanie Au; Natalie Kan	Women's 4 × 100 m freestyle relay	3:42.42	15	—N/a		Did not advance	
Stephanie Au; Siobhán Haughey; Natalie Kan; Tam Hoi Lam	Women's 4 × 100 m medley relay	4:03.56	13	—N/a		Did not advance	

== Table tennis ==
Hong Kong entered a full squad of female and mixed team table tennis player into the Games, by advancing to the quarter-finals round, through the 2024 World Team Table Tennis Championships in Busan, South Korea; and winning the semifinal match at the 2024 ITTF Mixed Doubles Qualification Tournament in Havířov, Czech Republic. Later on, Wong Chun Ting qualified for the games through the re-allocations of the East Asian Qualification Tournaments.

Athlete	Event	Preliminary	Round of 64	Round of 32	Round of 16	Quarterfinals	Semifinals	Final / BM	
Athlete	Event	Opposition Result	Opposition Result	Opposition Result	Opposition Result	Opposition Result	Opposition Result	Opposition Result	Rank
Wong Chun Ting	Men's singles	Bye	Diaw (SEN); W 4–3	Fan (CHN); L 1–4	Did not advance				
Doo Hoi Kem	Women's singles	Bye	Pyon S (PRK); L 1–4	Did not advance					
Zhu Chengzhu	Women's singles	Bye	Chien T (TPE); W 4–0	Hirano (JPN); L 0–4	Did not advance				
Doo Hoi Kem; Zhu Chengzhu; Lee Ho Ching	Women's team	—N/a			Sweden; L 2–3	Did not advance			
Wong Chun Ting; Doo Hoi Kem	Mixed doubles	—N/a			Ecseki (HUN); Madarász (HUN); W 4–1	Robles (ESP); Xiao (ESP); W 4–2	Ri (PRK); Kim (PRK); L 3–4	Lim J-h / Shin Y-b (KOR); L 0–4	4

== Taekwondo ==
Hong Kong qualified one athlete to compete at the games. Lo Wai Fung qualified for the games, through the re-allocations of Ali Reza Abbasi quota place (after Ali fail to nominated into the Refugee Olympics Team) at the 2024 Asian Qualification Tournament in Tai'an, China. This is the first time Hong Kong qualified an athlete for a Taekwondo classification event.

Athlete	Event	Qualification	Round of 16	Quarterfinals	Semifinals	Repechage	Final / BM	
Athlete	Event	Opposition Result	Opposition Result	Opposition Result	Opposition Result	Opposition Result	Opposition Result	Rank
Lo Wai Fung	Men's −68 kg	Al Ghotany (EOR); W 2–0	Rashitov (UZB); L 0–2	Did not advance		Liang (CHN); L 0–2	Did not advance	7

== Triathlon ==
Hong Kong entered one male triathlete in the triathlon events for Paris, following the release of final individual olympics qualification ranking.

Individual

Athlete	Event	Time						Rank
Athlete	Event	Swim (1.5 km)	Trans 1	Bike (40 km)	Trans 2	Run (10 km)	Total	Rank
Jason Ng Tai Long	Men's	24:06	0:51	DNF				

== See also ==
- Hong Kong at the 2024 Winter Youth Olympics
