= Chow Tsun Man =

Hong Kong sports shooter

Personal information
- Nationality: Hong Konger
- Born: 10 June 1931

Sport
- Sport: Sports shooting

Chow Tsun Man (born 10 June 1931) is a Hong Kong sports shooter. He competed at the 1976 Summer Olympics and the 1984 Summer Olympics.
