= Andrew Loh =

Hong Kong swimmer (born 1949)

Personal information
- Born: 9 October 1949 (age 76) Shanghai, China

Sport
- Sport: Swimming

Andrew Loh (born 9 October 1949) is a Hong Kong former butterfly, freestyle and medley swimmer. He competed in five events at the 1968 Summer Olympics.
