= Francisco Monteiro =

Hong Kong swimmer

Personal information
- Born: 3 February 1926
- Died: 20 September 2002 (aged 76)

Sport
- Sport: Swimming

Francisco Monteiro (3 February 1926 – 20 September 2002) was a Hong Kong freestyle swimmer. He competed in three events at the 1952 Summer Olympics.
