= Cheng Shu Ming =

Hong Kong sports shooter (born 1945)

Personal information
- Nationality: Hong Konger
- Born: 25 November 1945 (age 79)

Sport
- Sport: Sports shooting

Cheng Shu Ming, also known as Micky Cheng, (born 25 November 1945) is a Hong Kong sports shooter. He competed at the 1984 Summer Olympics and the 1996 Summer Olympics.
