= Lawrence Kwoh =

Hong Kong swimmer

Personal information
- Born: 21 April 1960 (age 66)

Sport
- Sport: Swimming

Lawrence Kwoh (born 21 April 1960) is a Hong Kong former swimmer. He competed in two events at the 1976 Summer Olympics.
