= Chan Lam Hams =

Hong Kong cyclist

Personal information
- Born: 13 May 1955 (age 71)

Cycling career
- Sport: Cycling

Chan Lam Hams (born 13 May 1955) is a former cyclist from Hong Kong. He competed in the individual road race and team time trial events at the 1976 Summer Olympics.
