= Yu Yuet =

Hong Kong diver

Personal information
- Born: March 16, 1976 (age 49)

Sport
- Sport: Diving

Yu Yuet (Chinese: 俞越, born 16 March 1976) is a former Hong Kong diver. He competed in men's 3 metre springboard at the 2000 Summer Olympics, finishing 48th.
