= Kwong Chi Yan =

Hong Kong cyclist

Personal information
- Born: 3 December 1956 (age 69)

Cycling career
- Sport: Cycling

Kwong Chi Yan (born 3 December 1956) is a Hong Kong former cyclist. He competed in the individual road race and team time trial events at the 1976 Summer Olympics.
