= Chan Fai Lui =

Hong Kong cyclist (born 1955)

Personal information
- Born: 28 March 1955 (age 71)

Cycling career
- Sport: Cycling

Chan Fai Lui (born 28 March 1955) is a Hong Kong former cyclist. He competed in three events at the 1976 Summer Olympics.
