= Table tennis at the 2020 Summer Olympics =

Table tennis at the Games of the XXXII Olympiad
- Venue: Tokyo Metropolitan Gymnasium
- Dates: 24 July – 6 August 2021
- No. of events: 5
- Competitors: 173 from 57 nations

Table tennis was a sport at the 2020 Summer Olympics in Tokyo (postponed to 2021 due to the COVID-19 pandemic), and featured 173 table tennis players. Table tennis had appeared at the Summer Olympics on eight previous occasions beginning with the 1988 Summer Olympics.

== Qualification ==
As the host nation, Japan had automatically qualified six athletes; a team of three men and women with one each competing in the singles as well as a mixed doubles team.

For the team events, 16 teams were qualified. Each continent (with the Americas being divided into North America and South America for ITTF competition) had a qualifying competition to qualify one team. Nine teams qualified through a world qualifying event.

The mixed doubles also had 16 pairs qualify. Each continent (with the Americas being divided into North America and South America for ITTF competition) had a qualifying competition to qualify one pair. Four teams qualified through the World Tour Grand Finals 2019 and five through the World Tour 2020. Japan was also guaranteed a place. If an NOC had both a mixed doubles pair and a team in one or both genders qualify, the doubles player must be a member of the team in their gender.

For individual events, between 64 and 70 individual players qualified. Each NOC with a qualified team were permitted to enter two members of that team in the individual competition. 22 quota places would be awarded through continental championships to individuals who belong to an NOC without a qualified team. There would be one Tripartite Commission invitation place. The remainder of the total 172 quota places would be filled through a final world singles qualifying tournament (no less than two and no more than eight qualifiers) and then the ITTF world ranking.

== Competition schedule ==
Legend
| P | Preliminary round | ¼ | Quarter-finals | ½ | Semi-finals | F | Final |

| Event↓/Date → | Sat 24 | Sun 25 | | Mon 26 | Tue 27 | Wed 28 | Thu 29 | | Fri 30 | Sat 31 | Sun 1 | Mon 2 | Tue 3 | Wed 4 | Thu 5 | Fri 6 |
|---|---|---|---|---|---|---|---|---|---|---|---|---|---|---|---|---|
| Men's singles | P | | | | | ¼ | ½ | | F | | | | | | | |
| Men's team | | | | | | | | | | | P | | ¼ | ½ | | F |
| Women's singles | P | | | | | ¼ | ½ | F | | | | | | | | |
| Women's team | | | | | | | | | | | P | | ¼ | ½ | F | |
| Mixed doubles | P | ¼ | ½ | F | | | | | | | | | | | | |

== Participating nations ==
A total of 173 athletes (85 men and 88 women), representing 57 NOCs, competed in five events. One Czech athlete tested positive for COVID-19 and withdrew from the Games. Two NOCs (China and Hungary) replaced injured athletes with reserves in the team event.

- Algeria (1)
- Argentina (2)
- Australia (6)
- Austria (6)
- Brazil (6)
- Bulgaria (1)
- Canada (3)
- Chile (1)
- China (6+1)
- Cameroon (1)
- Croatia (3)
- Cuba (2)
- Czech Republic (3-1)
- Denmark (1)
- Ecuador (1)
- Egypt (6)
- Fiji (1)
- France (6)
- Great Britain (3)
- Germany (6)
- Greece (1)
- Guyana (1)
- Hong Kong (6)
- Hungary (5+1)
- India (4)
- Iran (1)
- Italy (1)
- Japan (6)
- Kazakhstan (2)
- Luxembourg (2)
- Mongolia (2)
- Monaco (1)
- Netherlands (1)
- Nigeria (4)
- ~~North Korea (3)~~
- Poland (3)
- Portugal (5)
- Puerto Rico (3)
- ROC (3)
- Romania (4)
- Saudi Arabia (1)
- Senegal (1)
- Serbia (3)
- Singapore (4)
- Slovakia (3)
- Slovenia (3)
- South Korea (6)
- Spain (3)
- Sweden (5)
- Switzerland (1)
- Syria (1)
- Chinese Taipei (6)
- Thailand (2)
- Togo (1)
- Tunisia (2)
- Ukraine (3)
- United States (6)
- Vanuatu (1)

== Medal summary ==
=== Medal table ===
* Host nation (Japan)

| Rank | NOC | Gold | Silver | Bronze | Total |
|---|---|---|---|---|---|
| 1 | China | 4 | 3 | 0 | 7 |
| 2 | Japan* | 1 | 1 | 2 | 4 |
| 3 | Germany | 0 | 1 | 1 | 2 |
| 4 | Chinese Taipei | 0 | 0 | 1 | 1 |
| 4 | Hong Kong | 0 | 0 | 1 | 1 |
| Totals (5 entries) | | 5 | 5 | 5 | 15 |

=== Medalists ===
| Event | Gold | Silver | Bronze |
|---|---|---|---|
| Men's singles | Ma Long; China | Fan Zhendong; China | Dimitrij Ovtcharov; Germany |
| Men's team | China; Fan Zhendong; Ma Long; Xu Xin | Germany; Dimitrij Ovtcharov; Patrick Franziska; Timo Boll | Japan; Jun Mizutani; Koki Niwa; Tomokazu Harimoto |
| Women's singles | Chen Meng; China | Sun Yingsha; China | Mima Ito; Japan |
| Women's team | China; Chen Meng; Sun Yingsha; Wang Manyu | Japan; Mima Ito; Kasumi Ishikawa; Miu Hirano | Hong Kong; Doo Hoi Kem; Lee Ho Ching; Minnie Soo |
| Mixed doubles | Japan; Jun Mizutani; Mima Ito | China; Xu Xin; Liu Shiwen | Chinese Taipei; Lin Yun-ju; Cheng I-ching |

== See also ==
- Table tennis at the 2018 Asian Games
- Table tennis at the 2018 Summer Youth Olympics
- Table tennis at the 2019 European Games
- Table tennis at the 2019 Pan American Games
- Table tennis at the 2020 Summer Paralympics
