= John Park (sailor) =

Hong Kong sailor

Personal information
- Nationality: Hong Konger
- Born: 4 June 1924; Tianjin, China
- Died: 16 July 2004 (aged 80); Seattle, Washington, United States

Sport
- Sport: Sailing

John Park (4 June 1924 – 16 July 2004) was a Hong Kong sailor. He competed at the 1964 Summer Olympics and the 1968 Summer Olympics.
