= Henry Souza =

Hong Kong sports shooter

Personal information
- Born: 12 July 1921 Hong Kong
- Died: 8 May 1975 (aged 53) Vancouver, British Columbia, Canada

Sport
- Sport: Sports shooting

Henry Souza (12 July 1921 – 8 May 1975) was a Hong Kong sports shooter. He competed at the 1960 Summer Olympics, the 1964 Summer Olympics and 1958 and 1966 Asian Games.
