= William Turnbull (sailor) =

Hong Kong sailor (1933–2007)

Personal information
- Nationality: Hong Konger
- Born: 13 November 1933; Falmouth, England
- Died: 4 March 2007 (aged 73); Hong Kong

Sport
- Sport: Sailing

William Turnbull (13 November 1933 – 4 March 2007) was a Hong Kong sailor. He competed at the 1964 Summer Olympics and the 1968 Summer Olympics. Turnbull died in Hong Kong on 4 March 2007, at the age of 73.
