= Reginald Dos Remedios =

Hong Kong sports shooter (1922–2005)

Personal information
- Born: 12 December 1922 Shanghai, China
- Died: 22 September 2005 (aged 82) Los Angeles, California, USA

Sport
- Sport: Sports shooting

Reginald Emanuel Dos Remédios, also spelled Reginaldo (12 December 1922 – 22 September 2005) was a Hong Kong sports shooter. He competed at the 1964 Summer Olympics and the 1976 Summer Olympics. He also competed at the 1962, 1966 and 1970 Asian Games.
