= William Gillies (sport shooter) =

Hong Kong sport shooter

Personal information
- Born: 15 September 1914 Scotland
- Died: 17 December 1986 (aged 72)

Sport
- Sport: Sports shooting

William Gillies (15 September 1914 – 17 December 1986) was a Scottish sports shooter. He competed at the 1960 Summer Olympics and the 1964 Summer Olympics representing Hong Kong.
