= Paul Cooper (sailor) =

Hong Kong sailor (1928–2022)

Paul Coope
Personal information
- Full name: Paul Joseph Coope
- Nationality: Hong Konger
- Born: 13 January 1928; Stockport, England
- Died: 15 January 2022 (aged 94); Poole, England

Sport
- Sport: Sailing

Paul Coope (13 January 1928 – 15 January 2022) was a Hong Kong sailor. He competed at the 1964 Summer Olympics and the 1968 Summer Olympics.
