= Wan Shiu Ming =

Hong Kong swimmer

Personal information
- Born: 1938 (age 87–88)

Sport
- Sport: Swimming

Wan Shiu Ming (溫兆明, born 1938) is a Hong Kong former freestyle swimmer. He competed in two events at the 1956 Summer Olympics.
