= Robert Loh =

Hong Kong swimmer (born 1946)

Personal information
- Born: 24 January 1946 (age 80) Shanghai, China

Sport
- Sport: Swimming

Robert Loh (born 24 January 1946) is a Hong Kong former butterfly, freestyle and medley swimmer. He competed at the 1964 Summer Olympics and the 1968 Summer Olympics.
