= Cheung Kin Man =

Hong Kong swimmer (born 1932)

Personal information
- Full name: 張乾文, Pinyin: Zhāng qíanwén Jyutping: zoeng1 kin4 man4
- Born: 15 June 1932 (age 94) Borneo

Sport
- Sport: Swimming

Cheung Kin Man (張乾文, born 15 June 1932) is a Hong Kong former freestyle and backstroke swimmer. He competed at the 1952, 1956 and the 1960 Summer Olympics. He finished fifth in the 1954 British Empire and Commonwealth Games 110 yards freestyle and was eliminated in the heats of the 110 yards backstroke.
