= Sports Federation and Olympic Committee of Hong Kong, China =

National Olympic Committee

- Country: Hong Kong, China
- Code: HKG
- Created: 1950
- Recognized: 1951
- Headquarters: So Kon Po, Hong Kong
- President: Timothy Fok
- Website: hkolympic.org

The Sports Federation and Olympic Committee of Hong Kong, China (中國香港體育協會暨奧林匹克委員會; in short SF&OC, 港協暨奧委會) is the National Olympic Committee of Hong Kong, China. As such it is a separate member of the International Olympic Committee (IOC). It is also a member of the Olympic Council of Asia. The current president is Timothy Fok. The headquarters building is called the Hong Kong Olympic House, located beside Hong Kong Stadium.

== History ==
The emblem used until the handover of Hong Kong in 1997

Before the handover of Hong Kong from the United Kingdom to the People's Republic of China in 1997, the committee was called the Sports Federation and Olympic Committee of Hong Kong and participated in 12 games (all summer) under the name "Hong Kong".

After the 1997 handover, Hong Kong became a special administrative region that, albeit part of China, enjoys a high degree of autonomy defined by the Basic Law, its organic law. The law guarantees the territory's right to join international organisations and events independently (such as the Olympic Games) that are not restricted to sovereign states, under the new name "Hong Kong, China". If any of the Hong Kong athletes wins a medal in the Olympics, the Hong Kong flag is raised during the medal ceremony and the national anthem of the People's Republic of China is played for any gold medallists.

With the government's support, the Sports Federation and Olympic Committee submitted Hong Kong's bid for hosting the 2006 Asian Games to the Olympic Council of Asia (OCA) in 2000. Hong Kong lost the bid to Doha at the OCA general meeting held in Busan, South Korea on 12 November 2000.

At the 2008 Summer Olympics, the territory hosted the equestrian events.

=== Name inclusion: China ===
In January 2023, the SF&OC told its member National Sports Associations (NSAs) that they must include the word "China" in their association names by July 2023, or else face expulsion from the SF&OC, which could result in them losing government funding and their right to represent the city in major competitions. Edgar Yang Joe-tsi of the SF&OC cited Article 149 of the Basic Law as reason for the requirement. However, Article 149 states that the phrase "Hong Kong, China" be used "as required," which member NSAs had understood to mean it was optional. Yang also said "You are also reminded to use the name 'Hong Kong, China' when participating in any international sports competitions/activities and to display it on uniforms, websites and all other publicity materials, where applicable."

== Controversy ==
The SF&OC and its member NSAs have been repeatedly cautioned throughout the years by the Independent Commission Against Corruption (ICAC) and Leisure and Cultural Services Department (LCSD) against corruption and to implement better governance.

=== 2000s ===
In December 2003, Legislative Council member Albert Chan asked the Secretary of Home Affairs, Patrick Ho, about NSAs and a perceived waste of taxpayer money, stating "Many national sports associations (NSAs) rely on public funding for operation and hosting sports events. However, some members of the public query some NSAs for their failure to make effective use of the funding to promote and develop sports events, resulting in a waste of public money."

In June 2006, the LCSD and ICAC held a seminar, named "Striving for Good Corporate Governance" to brief more than 100 members of NSAs on ways prevent corruption. The deputy director of the LCSD said that "As users of public funds, sports bodies must not only discharge their obligations under the Subvention Agreement but also conduct their business in a transparent, fair and open manner."

In 2007, an investigation was conducted by the Ombudsman, who was concerned about whether the LCSD had appropriate mechanisms to monitor NSAs for conflict of interests. The issue stemmed from a March 2006 complaint that the Hong Kong Amateur Athletic Association (HKAAA) had awarded a contract to a company owned by the HKAAA's chairman. Separately, in early 2007, the LCSD organised two workshops for NSAs on governance.

In October 2009, the Audit Commission submitted a report to the Legislative Council, with recommendations to tighten up supervision of taxpayer funds to NSAs.

=== 2010s ===
In January 2010, the LCSD's Sports Commission wrote a policy named "Governance of National Sports Associations", outlining methods that the LCSD would take to further promote transparent governance from NSAs. In November 2010, a newspaper published an open letter, which questioned the criteria used to select Roller sports athletes for the 2010 Asian Games. The government responded that only the SF&OC and NSAs were responsible for selecting athletes, and that "While the Government respects the autonomy and independence of the SF&OC and NSAs, we nonetheless closely monitor the use of public money by these organisations to ensure that it is deployed effectively in promoting sports development."

In 2011, the ICAC formulated the "Best Practice Reference for Governance of National Sports Associations - Towards Excellence in Sports Professional Development". ICAC's goal was to enhance governance and transparency from NSAs. Additionally, ICAC further mentioned that the report was for "Addressing public concern on the governance of national sports associations (NSAs)". In 2020, the Audit Commission found that the SF&OC had yet to implement some of the best practices.

In 2013, ICAC hosted another seminar with coaches from 33 NSAs, on the prevention of issues such as bribery and conflicts of interest.

In February 2015, the Legislative Council released an 85-page research report on the SF&OC, which pointed out deficiencies, such as "NOCs in Hong Kong and Singapore have hitherto released limited publicly available information regarding their operations. While they have uploaded their respective constitution onto their websites, other relevant documents such as annual reports, balance sheets and statements of accounts are not available in the public domain. In comparison, NOCs in Australia, Japan and the US show a high degree of openness and transparency with proactive disclosure of relevant information for the public understanding and scrutiny of their operations."

In 2015, a seminar was co-hosted between the SF&OC and the Equal Opportunities Commission (EOC), on eliminating sexual harassment in the sports sector. However, three years later in 2018, it was revealed that only 10 of 79 NSAs had created guidelines against sexual harassment. The chairman of the EOC stated that "We are disappointed to see many NSAs that have not produced such guidelines and policies".

In August 2016, the Hong Kong Economic Journal released an article, accusing the SF&OC and Timothy Fok of various transgressions. For example, it claimed Timothy Fok has power on all important subcommittees, including those which select athletes, and those which control finances. In addition, it claimed that Timothy Fok appointed his son, Kenneth Fok, as vice-president, without transparency, and that Kenneth Fok has no record in any type of sporting achievement.

=== 2020s ===
In April 2020, the government's Audit Commission released a 141-page report after investigating the Olympic Committee, describing various failures with the SF&OC, including lax governance. The Audit Commission noted that around half of SF&OC's 29 subcommittees had not met for two years. Procurement rules were also not followed, including the SF&OC getting only single quotes from suppliers instead of tendering offers, causing a rising deficit of HK$33,000 in 2014–15 to HK$588,000 in 2018–19.

Audit also accused SF&OC of having unclear criteria for selecting athletes for international competitions, including the selection of 11 of 17 athletes for the 2018 Asian Games based on criteria that was not previously given to their NSAs. A month later, in May 2020, Legislative Council members questioned the Olympic Committee's governance, accusing the SF&OC of lacking transparency when selecting athletes for the 2018 Asian Games. In particular, the legislators asked why the fastest swimmer was not selected to compete, with a slower swimmer selected instead. In one conversation, legislator Abraham Razack asked "The Olympic Committee spends HK$20 million a year of public money but has it been fair to the athletes?" SCMP noted that the Olympic Committee's total government funding was HK$38.9 million in 2018–19.

In response, Baptist University's Professor Chung Pak-kwong, former chief executive of the Hong Kong Sports Institute, said that the SF&OC "has grown into an empire and transparency and accountability are not in their dictionary". Furthermore, the SCMP released an editorial, agreeing with the Audit Commission and stating that the city's sports development was at risk.

In July 2020, the Legislative Council's Public Accounts Committee criticised the Hong Kong Football Association under Timothy Fok, stating its governance was "appalling and inexcusable". It noted that an internal audit committee, designed to review the association's use of taxpayer funding, was not active between 2015 and 2019, despite receiving HK$34 million in funding for the 2017-18 year.

In October 2020, the Chief Secretary for Administration announced that the HAB would provide HK$5 million each year for 5 years (2020–21 to 2025–26) to SF&OC to review the operation and internal monitoring of all national sports association members, designed to review and audit their processes.

In 2021, ICAC charged the vice chairman of the executive committee of the Hong Kong Basketball Association (HKBA) with disclosing an ICAC probe, as well as a coach of the Hong Kong women's national handball team for faking timesheet records.

In August 2021, a triathlete who represented Hong Kong at the 2020 Summer Olympics stated that NSAs had enough funding, but were not doing enough to identify and develop top athletes to funnel them to the Hong Kong Sports Institute, causing about 90% of qualified triathletes to drop out of the sport.

In September 2021, SCMP published an article which detailed multiple complaints against the Hong Kong Ice Hockey Association (HKIHA), from former coaches and players. They accused the association of lacking transparency in corporate governance, as well as conflicts of interest between the chairman and the association, causing the development of the sport to be hampered. Some of those interviewed claimed that they had been frustrated with the association from the 1990s, and that letters to the LCSD had gone ignored.

In April 2022, the Hong Kong Basketball Association (HKBA) drew criticism from local basketball players, after local media reported that the HKBA had withdrawn from the 2025 FIBA Asia Cup and did not register a team to participate in the qualifiers; the HKBA claimed that there was a miscommunication issue.

In September 2023, local media reported that 2 sports associations under the SF&OC had consistently failed to submit annual audited financial returns; the Hong Kong Weightlifting and Powerlifting Association, and the Hong Kong Tug of War Association.

In October 2023, Bernard Chan wrote that "governing bodies must operate to the highest professional standards, with equally high standards of governance, accountability and transparency."

In January 2024, a former Hong Kong elite Olympic coach moved to the UK because she said Hong Kong did not offer enough support for elite coaches, saying she was unpaid.

In June 2024, the ex-head coach of Hong Kong football team, Jorn Andersen, said that Hong Kong Football Association receiving millions of taxpayer dollars every year made the HKFA have no motivation to improve, and said that the HKFA needed to be "more professional, from top to bottom," and did "not do enough" to improve the sport. He also named Eric Fok as not taking enough action for the sport.

In July 2024, Alex Fong criticised the Hong Kong China Swimming Association for not allowing a young swimmer to compete, despite the swimmer having a qualified time. Fong said that the association was "indifferent" towards young and promising athletes; the association later allowed the young swimmer to compete, but did not change its regulations to allow future swimmers from competition swimming clubs to compete, and said that future swimmers must first write an application to the association.

In August 2024, after complaints that athletes were paid less than minimum wage, Edgar Yang, an official of the SF&OC, said that athletes should consider their stipends as a "perk." After Yang's statement, multiple current and former athletes complained about the financial burdens they endured.

In February 2025, a former manager of the Hong Kong China Swimming Association admitted to fraud after he falsely claimed that athletes had attended water polo training, and took most of the government training funds.

== Funding ==
Other National Olympic Committees, such as the US Olympic and Paralympic Committee, do not receive any taxpayer funding. By contrast, the SF&OC receives 3 sources of government funding:

1. Arts and Sport Development Fund (Sports Portion) (ASDF)
2. Home Affairs Bureau (HAB)'s funding
3. Leisure and Cultural Services Department (LCSD)'s recurrent subvention

According to the Audit Commission, total government funding for 2018-19 was HK$38.9 million. The HAB said that it will increase its funding from HK$20 million in 2019–20 to HK$40.6 million in 2020–21.

An additional HK$5 million each year for 5 years (2020–21 to 2025–26) will go to the SF&OC to review the operation and internal monitoring of all national sports association members, designed to review and audit their processes.

== Incidents ==
=== National anthem incidents ===
In November 2022, honorary secretary general Ronny Wong said that junior staff should not be allowed to play national anthems at competitions, after "Glory to Hong Kong" was played at a rugby match in South Korea. Wong also said he found the mistake hard to believe and would not accept the explanation or apology from Asia Rugby, and said that South Korea should be banned from hosting similar events. Wong also said that most of the Hong Kong team members were "foreigners". After a second incident was revealed, Wong said that the SF&OC would issue new guidelines on using the anthem and flag, and that the SF&OC would instruct players to make gestures if the played anthem is incorrect.

In March 2023, after another incident where Glory to Hong Kong was played, Pui Kwan-kay of the SF&OC said that the government should force Google to de-prioritize the song on its search results. The SF&OC created a committee to investigate the Hong Kong Ice Hockey Association (HKIHA) after the incident, and said that the association may be kicked out of the Olympic Committee for failing to follow procedures to produce the correct anthem. The HKIHA responded by saying that the SF&OC provided a faulty link to download the correct anthem, when the webpage was changed to English. The HKIHA also said that the SF&OC was to blame, and said "We felt that the SF&OC personnel handling the matter hoped to prove that only the HKIHA was at fault, and did not treat SF&OC's role and responsibility in this incident seriously."

In May 2023, the SF&OC told its member sports associations to boycott ceremonies if the event organiser does not let them verify the national anthem.

== Organisational structure ==
=== Members ===
Only the members of SF&OC could send athletes to representing Hong Kong in multi-sports events organised by Asian Olympics Committee or IOC, such as Asian Games and Olympic Games. Hong Kong Sports Stars Awards also only accept those athletes by the member associations. Therefore, some famous sportsmen were unable to participate in the election.

==== Member list ====
Latest update on 27 May 2018. Karatedo Federation of Hong Kong was temporarily suspended with effect from 8 June 2018.

No.	Organization	Sport	Year of establishment	Year of acceptance
1	Victoria Recreation Club	N/A	1849	
2	South China Athletic Association	N/A	1910	
3	Chinese Young Men's Christian Association of Hong Kong	N/A	1901	
4	Hong Kong Association of Athletics Affiliates	Athletics	1951	
5	Hong Kong Fencing Association	Fencing	1949	
6	Gymnastics Association of Hong Kong	Gymnastics	1965	
7	Handball Association of Hong Kong	Handball	1970	
8	Hong Kong Rowing Association	Rowing	1978	
9	Hong Kong Amateur Swimming Association	Swimming	1950	
10	Hong Kong Weightlifting and Powerlifting Association	Weightlifting, Powerlifting		
11	Hong Kong Archery Association	Archery	1972	
12	Hong Kong Badminton Association	Badminton	1934	
13	Hong Kong Basketball Association	Basketball		
14	Hong Kong Boxing Association	Boxing	1955	
15	Hong Kong Canoe Union	Canoeing		
16	Hong Kong Cycling Association	Cycling	1960	
17	Hong Kong Football Association	Football	1914	
18	Hong Kong Hockey Association	Hockey	1933	
19	Hong Kong Equestrian Federation	Equestrian	1973	
20	Judo Association of Hong Kong	Judo	1970	
21	Hong Kong Volleyball Association	Volleyball	1959	
22	Hong Kong Lawn Bowls Association	Lawn bowls		
23	Hong Kong Miniature Football Association	Miniature football		
24	Hong Kong Shooting Association	Shooting	1994	
25	Hong Kong Softball Association	Softball	1937	
26	Hong Kong Table Tennis Association	Table tennis	1936	
27	Hong Kong Tennis Association	Tennis	1909	
28	Hong Kong Sailing Federation	Sailing	1962	
29	Hong Kong Tenpin Bowling Congress	Bowling		
30	Hong Kong Wushu Union Limited	Wushu		
31	Hong Kong Rugby Union	Rugby union	1956	
32	Hong Kong Squash	Squash	1961	
33	Hong Kong Triathlon Association	Triathlon		
34	Hong Kong Baseball Association	Baseball	1992	
35	Windsurfing Association of Hong Kong	Windsurfing	1979	
36	Karatedo Federation of Hong Kong	Karate		
37	Hong Kong Kendo Association	Kendo		
38	Hong Kong Little League	Little League Baseball		
39	Hong Kong Schools Sports Federation	N/A	1997	
40	Hong Kong Paralympic Committee & Sports Association	Paralympics		
41	Hong Kong Sports Association for Persons with Intellectual Disability	Disabled sports		
42	Hong Kong Chinese Martial Arts Dragon and Lion Dance Association	Dragon dance & Lion dance		
43	Hong Kong Taekwondo Association	Taekwondo		
44	Orienteering Association of Hong Kong	Orienteering	1981	
45	Hong Kong Ice Hockey Association	Ice hockey	1983	
46	Hong Kong Skating Union	Skating	1980	
47	University Sports Federation of Hong Kong	N/A		
48	Hong Kong Federation of Roller Sports	Roller sports & Skateboarding		
49	Cricket Hong Kong	Cricket	1968	
50	Hong Kong DanceSport Association	Dancesport		
51	Hong Kong Golf Association	Golf	1968	
52	Hong Kong Mountaineering and Climbing Union	Climbing & Mountaineering		
53	Hong Kong Dragon Boat Association	Dragon boat	1991	
54	Hong Kong Chinese Chess Association	Chinese chess		
55	Hong Kong Netball Association	Netball		
56	Hong Kong Shuttlecock Association	Shuttlecock		
57	Hong Kong Society for the Deaf	N/A		
58	Hong Kong Go Association	Go	1982	
59	Hong Kong Contract Bridge Association	Contract bridge		
60	Physical Fitness Association of Hong Kong	N/A		
61	Hong Kong Underwater Association	Underwater sports		
62	Hong Kong Kart Club	Kart racing		
63	Hong Kong Bodybuilding and Fitness Association	Bodybuilding		
64	Hong Kong Association of Sports Medicine and Sports Science	N/A		
65	Hong Kong Gateball Association Company	Gateball		
66	Hong Kong Paragliding Association	Paragliding		
67	Hong Kong Aviation Club	Aviation	1982	
68	Hong Kong Billiard Sports Control Council	Billiard sports	1993	
69	Hong Kong Ultimate Players Association	Ultimate	1991	
70	Hong Kong Life Saving Society	Lifesaving		
71	Hong Kong Water Ski Association	Water skiing		
72	Ski Association of Hong Kong	Skiing	2003	
73	Hong Kong Muay Thai Association	Muay Thai	2002	
74	Hong Kong Korfball Association	Korfball		
75	Hong Kong Woodball Association	Woodball		
76	Health Qigong Association of Hong Kong	Qigong		
77	Hong Kong Tug of War Association	Tug of war		
78	Hong Kong Lacrosse Association	Lacrosse	1993	
79	Hong Kong Automobile Association	Motorsport	1918	2017

== See also ==
- Chinese Olympic Committee
- Macau Sports and Olympic Committee
- Chinese Taipei Olympic Committee
- British Olympic Association
- Hong Kong bid for the 2006 Asian Games
