= 2011 ISAF Sailing World Championships – Star =

International sporting competition

Star at the 2011 ISAF Sailing World Championships
- Venue: Perth, Western Australia
- Dates: 11–17 December
- Competitors: 82 from 22 nations

Medalists
gold medal	Robert Scheidt; Bruno Prada	Brazil
silver medal	Robert Stanjek; Frithjof Kleen	Germany
bronze medal	Mark Mendelblatt; Brian Fatih	United States

The Star class at the 2011 ISAF Sailing World Championships was held in Perth, Western Australia between 11 and 17 December 2011.

== Results ==
Results of individual races
Pos	Helmsman	Country	I	II	III	IV	V	VI	VII	VIII	IX	X	MR	Tot	Pts
Gold medal	Robert Scheidt; Bruno Prada	Brazil	13^{†}	7	13	2	2	2	1	3	2	3	10	58	45
Silver medal	Robert Stanjek; Frithjof Kleen	Germany	3	5	16^{†}	5	5	11	3	11	4	8	6	77	61
Bronze medal	Mark Mendelblatt; Brian Fatih	United States	2	9	9	8	4	4	5	4	8	10^{†}	20	83	73
4	Mateusz Kusznierewicz; Dominik Życki	Poland	1	DNF 42^{†}	6	16	1	3	DNF 42	2	1	2	2	118	76
5	Fredrik Lööf; Max Salminen	Sweden	18^{†}	4	18	1	16	1	4	7	6	1	18	94	76
6	Eivind Melleby; Petter Mørland Pedersen	Norway	6	27	1	DSQ 42^{†}	10	9	11	6	3	4	4	123	81
7	Xavier Rohart; Pierre-Alexis Ponsot	France	24^{†}	18	15	11	6	6	2	16	5	6	14	123	99
8	Johannes Polgar; Markus Koy	Germany	26^{†}	RDG 13	8	21	3	13	10	10	16	5	8	133	107
9	Guillaume Florent; Pascal Rambeau	France	7	10	19	7	15	5	24^{†}	17	11	7	12	134	110
10	Richard Clarke; Tyler Bjorn	Canada	12	6	10	17	7	15	7	19^{†}	14	11	16	134	115
11	George Szabo; Mark Strube	United States	10	17	12	9	9	14	8	12	18	25^{†}	–	134	109
12	Peter O'Leary; David Burrows	Ireland	8	RDG 2	33	3	11	BFD 42^{†}	16	24	7	13	–	159	117
13	Afonso Domingos; Frederico Melo	Portugal	22	1	2	20	29	10	27	1	9	DNF 42^{†}	–	163	121
14	Andrew Campbell; Ian Coleman	United States	15	29^{†}	11	10	19	7	20	15	13	18	–	157	128
15	Johannes Babendererde; Timo Jacobs	Germany	5	11	4	22	17	8	12	OCS 42^{†}	28	23	–	172	130
16	Flavio Marazzi; Enrico De Maria	Switzerland	16	13	DNF 42^{†}	15	18	12	13	9	15	19	–	172	130
17	Diego Negri; Enrico Voltolini	Italy	9	21	22	12	12	23^{†}	14	23	10	12	–	158	135
18	Fernando Echávarri; Fernando Rodríguez	Spain	11	8	7	23	14	16	18	26^{†}	24	22	–	169	143
19	Alexander Schlonski; Matthias Bohn	Germany	14	32	31	13	23	BFD 42^{†}	6	5	21	9	–	196	154
20	Andy Horton; John von Schwarz	United States	32^{†}	RDG 21.4	30	6	DPI 16	DPI 29	19	18	23	20	–	214.4	182.4
21	Michael Hestbæk; Claus Olesen	Denmark	17	34	20	19	DNS 42^{†}	27	9	34	12	14	–	228	186
22	Mate Arapov; Ante Sitic	Croatia	30	19	17	30	21	20	15	28	17	OCS 42^{†}	–	239	197
23	Paul McKenzie; Phillip Toth	Australia	37^{†}	12	35	29	20	24	17	8	26	29	–	237	200
24	Rick Merriman; Phil Trinter	United States	20	22	23	RDG 19	32^{†}	18	29	22	19	30	–	234	202
25	Kunio Suzuki; Daichi Wada	Japan	31^{†}	16	28	31	31	19	22	20	27	15	–	240	209
26	Vasyl Gureyev; Volodymyr Korotkov	Ukraine	21	15	21	37	26	BFD 42^{†}	23	25	34	16	–	260	218
27	Aimilios Papathanasiou; Antonis Tsotras	Greece	34^{†}	30	3	34	8	30	32	27	33	24	–	255	221
28	Arthur Anosov; Vitalii Kushnir	Ukraine	28	24	29	24	24	29	25	21	31^{†}	17	–	252	221
29	Mark Bredford; David Giles	Australia	27	31	25	33	34^{†}	21	21	13	20	31	–	256	222
30	Iain Percy; Andrew Simpson	Great Britain	4	3	5	4	DNF 42^{†}	DNS 42	DNC 42	DNC 42	DNC 42	DNC 42	–	268	226
31	Marin Lovrović Jr. Siniša Mikuličić	Croatia	19	33^{†}	32	28	25	17	28	31	25	21	–	259	226
32	Stuart Hebb; Mike Wolfs	Canada	33^{†}	28	14	27	30	33	31	14	30	32	–	272	239
33	Iain Murray; Andrew Palfrey	Australia	29	25	34	36	22	DNF 42^{†}	30	30	29	27	–	304	262
34	Philip Carlsson; Benjamin Pettersson	Sweden	36	20	OCS 42^{†}	26	35	31	26	29	22	DNS 42	–	309	267
35	Gustavo Lima; Rubrio Basilio	Portugal	23	23	OCS 42^{†}	14	28	22	DNC 42	DNC 42	DNC 42	DNC 42	–	320	278
36	Lucio Oggi; Sergio Lambertenghi	Italy	35	DSQ 42^{†}	24	25	33	32	34	32	35	28	–	320	278
37	Alar Volmer; Mihkel Kosk	Estonia	DPI 41	36	27	DNF 42^{†}	27	28	35	DNF 42	DNF 42	26	–	346	304
38	Michel Niklaus; Vincent Hagin	Switzerland	41^{†}	37	26	38	37	34	33	35	32	33	–	346	305
39	Ante Razmilovic; Brian Hammersley	Great Britain	38	38	OCS 42^{†}	35	36	25	36	OCS 42	DNF 42	DNC 42	–	376	334
40	Dan Lovrović; Marin Lovrović Sr.	Croatia	25	35	DNC 42^{†}	32	DNC 42	DNC 42	DNC 42	DNC 42	DNC 42	DNC 42	–	386	344
41	Viktor Marti; Miklos Bezerti	Hungary	39	39	DPI 42^{†}	39	DSQ 42	BFD 42	DNE 42	33	36	DNC 42	–	396	354

Legend: – Qualified for medal race(s); BFD – Black flag disqualification; DNC – Did not come to the starting area; DNE – Non excludable disqualification; DNF – Did not finish; DPI – Discretionary penalty imposed; DSQ – Disqualified; OCS – On the course side of the starting line; RDG – Redress given; † – Discarded race not counted in the overall result;
