= 2012 Star World Championships =

The 2012 Star World Championships were held in Hyères, France between May 5 and 11, 2012. The hosting yacht club was COYCH.

== Results ==
Results of individual races
Pos	Crew	Country	I	II	III	IV	V	VI	Tot	Pts
Gold medal	Robert Scheidt (H); Bruno Prada	Brazil	7	2	6	10	5	39	69	30
Silver medal	Iain Percy (H); Andrew Simpson	Great Britain	6	7	1	1	17	38	70	32
Bronze medal	Michael Hestbæk (H); Claus Olesen	Denmark	25	3	7	13	7	3	58	33
4	Peter O'Leary (H); David Burrows	Ireland	3	4	12	7	18	14	58	40
5	Fredrik Lööf (H); Max Salminen	Sweden	2	32	3	27	4	7	75	43
6	Flavio Marazzi (H); Enrico De Maria	Switzerland	14	1	14	4	36	11	80	44
7	Hamish Pepper (H); Jim Turner	New Zealand	18	5	8	17	1	19	68	49
8	Emilios Papathanasiou (H); Antonios Tsotras	Greece	39	6	9	8	25	2	89	50
9	Xavier Rohart (H); Pierre-Alexis Ponsot	France	1	19	5	19	63	9	116	53
10	Mateusz Kusznierewicz (H); Dominik Życki	Poland	5	20	2	2	59	27	115	56
11	Robert Stanjek (H); Frithjof Kleen	Germany	8	8	16	14	12	17	75	58
12	Marin Lovrovic Jr. (H); Dan Lovrovic	Croatia	11	33	18	12	6	22	102	69
13	Arapov Mate (H); Siniša Mikuličić	Croatia	16	12	19	9	73; DNF	13	142	69
14	Fernando Echavarri Erason (H); Fernando Rodriguez Rivero	Spain	4	11	21	12; RDG	22	45	115	70
15	Hans Spitzauer (H); Gerd Habermueller	Austria	10	22	15	11	15	20	93	71
16	Johannes Polgar (H); Markus Koy	Germany	26	9	10	18	30	18	111	81
17	Eivind Melleby (H); Petter Pedersen	Norway	15	28	13	3	23	37	119	82
18	Richard Clarke (H); Tyler Bjorn	Canada	12	37	4	41	19	10	123	82
19	Afonso Domingos (H); Frederico Melo	Portugal	20	18	34	30	11	12	125	91
20	Gustavo Warburg (H); Lucas Carissimi	Argentina	17	29	26	15	37	5	129	92
21	Mark Mendelblatt (H); Brian Fatih	United States	13	34	11	33	73; DNC	6	170	97
22	Michel Niklaus (H); Mark Strube	Switzerland	33	14	23.5; RDG	21	13	73; DNF	177.5	104.5
23	George Szabo III (H); Vincent Hagin	United States	24	25	27	35	3	28	142	107
24	Benny Andersen (H); Mogens Just	Denmark	9	41	23	61	20	23	177	116
25	Daniel Stegmeier (H); Beat Stegmeier	Switzerland	21	23	39	6	33	34	156	117
26	Arthur Anosov (H); Vitalii Kushnir	Ukraine	49	62	17	26	2	26	182	120
27	Vasyl Gureyev (H); Volodymyr Korokov	Ukraine	31	50	22	24	14	43	184	134
28	Tom Löfstedt (H); Håkan Lundgren	Sweden	29	15	31	28	31	47	181	134
29	Marin Misura (H); Tonko Barac	Croatia	55	39	24	40	10	25	193	138
30	Alessandro Pascolato (H); Henry Paul Boening	Brazil	22	56	33	52	8	24	195	139
31	Davide Bortoletto (H); Alessandro Vongher	Italy	35	17	30	22	39	35	178	139
32	Diego Negri (H); Enrico Voltolini	Italy	19	35	73; DSQ	73; DNF	9	4	213	140
33	John Gimson (H); R. Anthony Shanks	Great Britain	23	38	29	20	62	30	202	140
34	Johnny Jensen (H); Jakob Groth	Denmark	44	13	37	45	32	15	186	141
35	Hubert Merkelbach (H); Nils Hollweg	Germany	32	46	73; DSQ	5	60	1	217	144
36	Paul McKenzie (H); Philip Toth	Australia	38	61	25	16	29	40	209	148
37	Ingvar Krook (H); Benjamin Peterson	Sweden	53	27	49	31	21	31	212	159
38	Kunio Suzuki (H); Daichi Wada	Japan	36	10	20	34	64	73; DNS	237	164
39	Julio Labandeira (H); Federico Calegari	Argentina	27	26	32	42	44	73; DNF	244	171
40	Jean Pascal Chatagny (H); Patrick Ducommun	Switzerland	73; OCS	21	35	60	16	51	256	183
41	Christoph Burger (H); Renato Marazzi	Switzerland	30	57	28	29	73; DNC	41	258	185
42	Juerg Wittich (H); Christian Trachsel	Switzerland	45	47	46	51	27	21	237	186
43	Paolo Nazzaro (H); Edouardo Natucci	Italy	37	16	41	54	41	57	246	189
44	Gerhard Weinrich (H); Alexander Kagl	Austria	43	48	51	25	24	49	240	189
45	George Vogiatzis (H); Stylianos Kyriakidis	Greece	34	68	47	37	73; BFD	8	267	194
46	Marc de Haas (H); Erik Veldhuizen	Netherlands	28	36	36	73; DNC	73; DNC	32	278	205
47	Denid Khashina (H); Dmitry Mechetin	Ukraine	40	60	43	38	52	33	266	206
48	Marc Friedrich (H); Benno Degen	Switzerland	46	59	45	39	34	50	273	214
49	Alar Volmer (H); Mikhel Kosk	Estonia	42	64	40	46	26	73; DNF	291	218
50	Kurt Scheidegger (H); Markus Scheidegger	Switzerland	57	55	42	32	40	53	279	222
51	Andrey Berezhnoy (H); Sergey Masalov	Russia	73; OCS	53	38	47	28	58	297	224
52	Daniel Wyss (H); Urs Joss	Switzerland	50	30	58	43	53	48	282	224
53	Lorenz Zimmermann (H); Ronald Roeseler	Switzerland	48	24	73; DNF	67	47	42	301	228
54	Tibor Tenke (H); Miklos Bezereti	Hungary	58	51	73; DNF	50	38	36	306	233
55	Roman Juchli (H); Philipp Juchli	Switzerland	73; OCS	40	73; DNF	23	35	64	308	235
56	Bostjan Antoncic (H); Gennadi Strakh	Slovenia	61	31	53	59	56	44	304	243
57	Walter Soellner (H); Xaver Soellner	Germany	65	58	57	58	55	16	309	244
58	Sander Jorissen (H); Hessel van Bennekom	Netherlands	56	66	73; DNF	36	57	29	317	244
59	Raoul Dabry (H); Tristan Cotte	France	51	43	44	49	58	63	308	245
60	Hans Stoeckli (H); Urs Spahr	Switzerland	47	44	73; DNF	53	54	55	326	253
61	Lars Edwall (H); Dan Anders Carlsson	Sweden	52	63	48	44	50	73; DNS	330	257
62	Bruce Long (H); Brett Wilson	Canada	63	45	56	66	42	56	328	262
63	Martin Tenconi (H); Yves Tenconi	France	59	54	50	57	51	52	323	264
64	Regis Berenguier (H); Vincent Berenguier	France	41	52	73; DNF	56	73; BFD	54	349	276
65	Arnd Glunde (H); Lemare Richard	Germany	54	73; BFD	54	62	45	65	353	280
66	Alexey Zhivitivskiy (H); Lev Schnyr	Russia	73; DNS	42	59	65	61	60	360	287
67	Francis Mercier (H); Antoine Bernault	France	64	65	73; DNF	48	48	62	360	287
68	Sergii Shevchenko (H); Andrii Kopach	Ukraine	66	67	55	63	46	59	356	289
69	Peter Erzberger (H); Hans-Jürg Saner	Switzerland	67	49	73; DNF	64	43	73; DNF	369	296
70	Jesper Sundman (H); Tom Sundman	Finland	62	73; RAF	73; DNF	55	49	61	373	300
71	Benjamin Sternberg (H); Donald Massey	United States	73; DNS	69	52	68	73; BFD	46	381	308
72	Jurg Ryffel (H); Alexander Gouda	Switzerland	60	73; DNC	73; DNC	73; DNC	73; DNC	73; DNC	425	352

Legend: BFD – Black flag disqualification; DNC – Did not come to the starting area; DNF – Did not finish; DNS – Did not start; DSQ – Disqualified; OCS – On the course side of the starting line; RAF – Retired after finishing; RDG – Redress given;
