= 2009 Star World Championships =

Event title
- Edition: 86th

Event details
- Venue: Varberg, Sweden
- Dates: 2–7 August 2009
- Yachts: Star

Competitors
- Competitors: 172
- Competing nations: 24

Results
- (gold) Gold: (United States) Szabo & Peters
- (silver) Silver: (New Zealand) Pepper & Monk
- (bronze) Bronze: (Brazil) Grael & Seifert

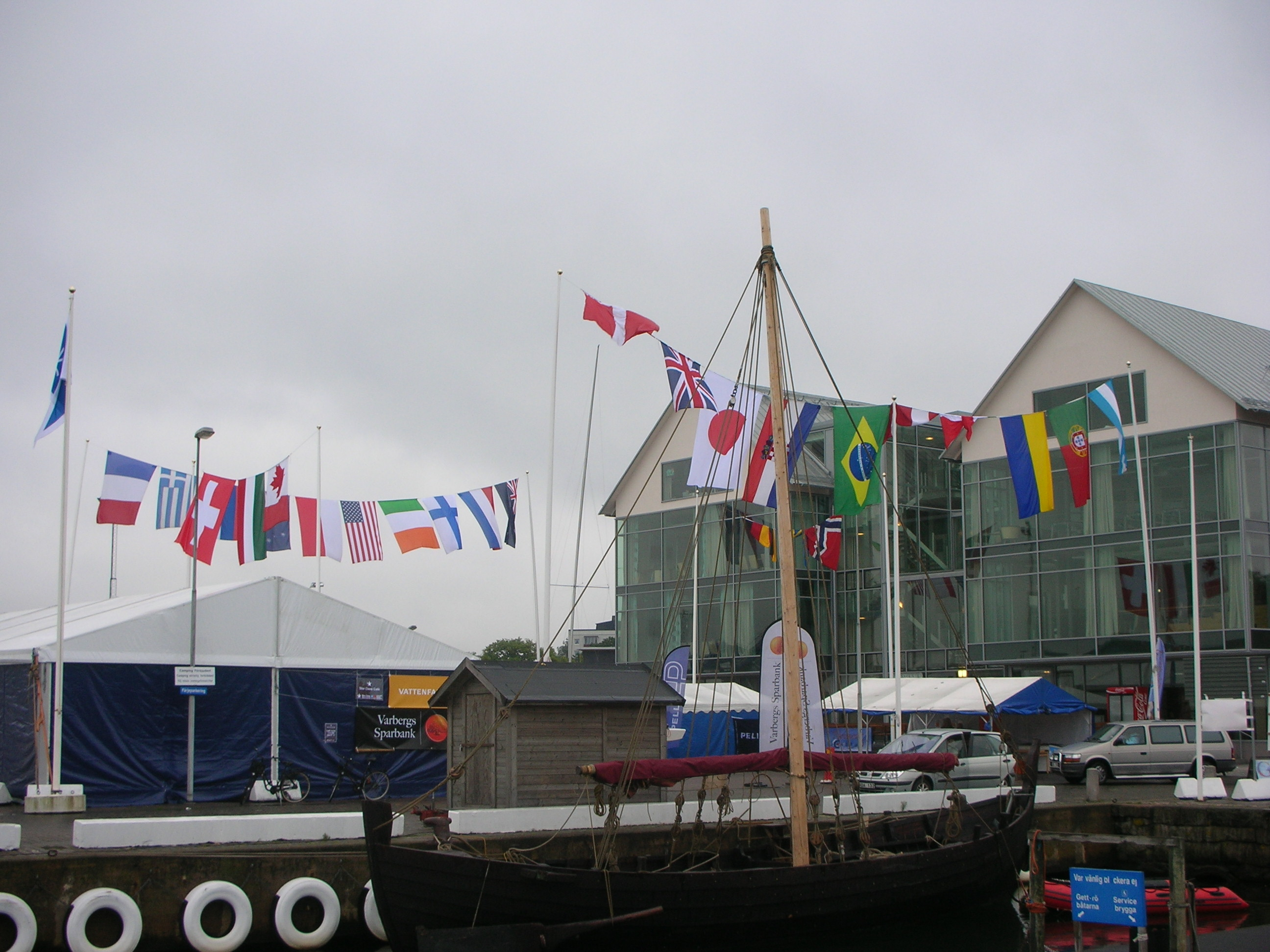
National flags in Varberg Harbour during the 2009 Star World Championships. Photo taken on 3 August.

The 2009 Star World Championships were held in Varberg, Sweden between August 2 and 7, 2009.

== Results ==
Results of individual races
Pos	Crew	Country	I	II	III	IV	V	VI	Tot	Pts
Gold medal	George Szabo III (H); Rick Peters	United States	54	1	3	20	3	3	84	30
Silver medal	Hamish Pepper (H); Craig Monk	New Zealand	11	9	1	11	5	25	62	37
Bronze medal	Lars Schmidt Grael (H); Ronald Seifert	Brazil	30	6	14	14	12	1	77	47
4	Alexander Schlonski (H); Frithjof Kleen	Germany	9	17	11	5	32	5	79	47
5	Andrew Campbell (H); Magnus Liljedahl	United States	14	14	4	8	8	37	85	48
6	Fredrik Lööf (H); Johan Tillander	Sweden	2	5	15	23	7	54	106	52
7	Mateusz Kusznierewicz (H); Dominik Życki	Poland	1	12	50	18	6	21	108	58
8	Flavio Marazzi (H); Enrico De Maria	Switzerland	3	3	35	1	20	35	97	62
9	Alejo Rigoni (H); Juan Pablo Percossi	Argentina	16	16	38	15	16	2	103	65
10	Johannes Polgar (H); Tim Kroeger	Germany	31	22	7	4	2	31	97	66
11	Robert Scheidt (H); Bruno Prada	Brazil	26	2	33	13	15	11	100	67
12	Afonso Domingos (H); Frederico Melo	Portugal	38	7	10	10	50	4	119	69
13	Diego Negri (H); Valerio Chinca	Italy	22	11	19	22	9	9	92	70
14	Andrew Macdonald (H); Brian Fatih	United States	17	13	64	17	10	13	134	70
15	Mark Mendelblatt (H); Mark Strube	United States	8	4	2	26	35	34	109	74
16	Mats Johansson (H); Leif Möller	Sweden	10	20	44	2	21	22	119	75
17	Maxwell Treacy (H); Anthony Shanks	Ireland	12	32	24	12	13	14	107	75
18	Xavier Rohart (H); Pierre-Alexis Ponsot	France	43	15	46	3	14	6	127	81
19	Robert Stanjek (H); Markus Koy	Germany	35	19	13	39	1	17	124	85
20	Marin Lovrovic Jr. (H); Siniša Mikuličić	Croatia	18	26	27	6	11	30	118	88
21	Nicola Celon (H); Edoardo Natucci	Italy	7	21	8	25	27	87; DNF	175	88
22	Matthias Miller (H); Benedikt Wenk	Germany	5	24	31	7	45	36	148	103
23	Peter O'Leary (H); Tim Goodbody	Ireland	15	10	22	53	22	38	160	107
24	Horacio Carabelli (H); Ubiratan Matos	Brazil	20	30	9	37	76	18	190	114
25	Benny Andersen (H); Mogens Just	Denmark	32	25	6	28	74	29	194	120
26	Dan Lovrovic (H); Antonio Arapovic	Croatia	59	8	45	30	23	20	185	126
27	Johannes Babandererde (H); Timo Jacobs	Germany	4	34	34	9	87; BFD	48	216	129
28	Juan Kouyoumdjian (H); Steven Erickson	Argentina	29	43	29	29	47	8	185	138
29	John Gimson (H); Ed Greig	Great Britain	19	27	12	21	70	62	211	141
30	Alberto Barovier (H); Nando Colaninno	Italy	21	42	20	40	62	23	208	146
31	Silvio Santoni (H); Fabio Toccoli	Italy	6	54	26	27	42	49	204	150
32	Manuel Voigt (H); Paul Sradnick	Germany	24	39	16	46	36	40	201	155
33	Paul McKenzie (H); Philip Toth	Australia	45	18	32	60	77	7	239	162
34	Flemming Sorensen (H); Niels Trysoe Hansen	Denmark	23	82	58	19	31	33	246	164
35	Lars Edwall (H); Henrik Ljungdahl	Sweden	48	52	36	36	30	15	217	165
36	Alexander Hagen (H); Kai Falkentahl	Germany	47	31	40	44	4	87; DNF	253	166
37	Andre Mirsky (H); Marcelo Jordao	Brazil	60	23	51	63	19	16	232	169
38	Ante Razmilovic (H); Brian Hammersley	Great Britain	28	38	23	41	72	39	241	169
39	Kunio Suzuki (H); Daichi Wada	Japan	41	59	21	24	33	68	246	178
40	Brian Cramer (H); Matt Johnston	Canada	51	28	63	62	17	26	247	184
41	Tibor Tenke (H); Miklos Berezeti	Hungary	25	37	18	52	53	52	237	184
42	Erik Dahlén (H); Krister Carlsson	Sweden	13	46	25	33	87; DNC	72	276	189
43	Konstantin Datsenko (H); Ilya Bazurin	Ukraine	36	57	80	43	34	19	269	189
44	Fredrik Ljungkvist (H); Daniel Alm	Sweden	40	79	37	58	18	41	273	194
45	Herluf Joergensen (H); Lars Wegener	Denmark	39	49	30	51	87; BFD	32	288	201
46	Andrew Landerberger (H); Beat Stegmeier	Australia	33	87; DSQ	5	47	58	59	289	202
47	Andrea Fornaro (H); Riccardo Capociuchi	Italy	65	60	65	34	37	10	271	206
48	Mate Arapov (H); Ivan Misura	Croatia	37	72	59	31	26	55	280	208
49	Carl Schröder (H); Stefan Hemlin	Sweden	27	87; DNF	42	35	54	53	298	211
50	Roman Juchli (H); Philipp Juchli	Switzerland	77	51	52	66	25	24	295	218
51	Hans Oskarsson (H); Håkan Lundgren	Sweden	69	67	39	48	28	42	293	224
52	Vasyl Gureyev (H); Volodymyr Korotkov	Ukraine	53	74	70	42	49	12	300	226
53	Henrik Dannesboe (H); Vincent Hagin	Switzerland	34	65	43	38	80	47	307	227
54	Kurt Scheidegger (H); Markus Scheidegger	Switzerland	46	66	54	45	40	50	301	235
55	Philip Carlson (H); Benjamin Peterson	Sweden	70	63	17	70	29	60	309	239
56	Henrik Jörhov (H); Karl Kristensen	Sweden	44	35	61	50	60	87; DNS	337	250
57	Tomas Franzen (H); Pontus Gabel	Sweden	78	45	41	64	38	64	330	252
58	Sander Jorissen (H); Erik Veldhuizen	Netherlands	56	36	82	16	63	87; DNS	340	253
59	Joni Leeve (H); Asko Salminen	Finland	58	64	55	49	68	28	322	254
60	Gerhard Weinrich (H); Alexander Kagl	Austria	82	40	53	56	79	27	337	255
61	Pelle Petterson (H); Anders Ekström	Sweden	50	29	75	78	67	46	345	267
62	Ingvar Krook (H); Henrik Hasselgren	Sweden	62	47	72	57	41	69	348	276
63	Christian Paucksch (H); Christian Knoll	Germany	63	73	60	68	24	67	355	282
64	Sune Carlsson (H); Dan Anders Carlsson	Sweden	74	44	28	76	65	73	360	284
65	Johnny Jensen (H); Claus Lauritsen	Denmark	55	55	78	55	43	87; DNS	373	286
66	Jan Strömbeck (H); Stefan Jacobsson	Sweden	75	61	69	32	51	87; DNS	375	288
67	Claude Bonanni (H); Richard Burgess	United States	52	62	62	59	61	57	353	291
68	Juerg Wittich (H); Christian Trachsel	Switzerland	72	50	68	72	59	43	364	292
69	Hubert Rauch (H); Christian Conrads	Germany	49	87; BFD	49	77	75	44	381	294
70	Olle Johansson (H); Dag Hansson	Sweden	73	33	71	67	55	70	369	296
71	Fredrik Fransson (H); Tomas Åkerman	Sweden	81	77	56	71	39	58	382	301
72	Arkadiusz Wierzbicki (H); Krzysztof Pawlowski	Poland	61	80	84	61	44	56	386	302
73	Peter van Veen (H); Paul Goeist	Netherlands	57	68	48	74	73	65	385	311
74	Andrey Berezhnoy (H); Sergey Masalov	Russia	67	71	85	82	48	45	398	313
75	Roberto Tomasini Grinover (H); Gunnar Bahr	Austria	71	69	67	54	57	87; DNS	405	318
76	Daniel Wyss (H); Urs Joss	Switzerland	68	58	74	87; DSQ	69	51	407	320
77	David Tabb (H); Tom Peyton	Great Britain	66	70	73	69	46	87; DNS	411	324
78	Regis Berenguier (H); Laurent Bernaz	France	76	53	57	73	66	87; DNS	412	325
79	Anders Hoagland (H); Gunnar Faernert	Sweden	79	41	81	75	71	63	410	329
80	Benny Nilsson (H); Stefan Fagerlund Nilsson	Sweden	83	78	47	80	56	71	415	332
81	Jochen Diercks (H); Herbert Braasch	Germany	64	81	66	65	78	61	415	334
82	Dierk Thomsen (H); Philip Behn	Germany	80	75	83	83	52	66	439	356
83	Gösta Eriksson (H); Björn Beskow	Sweden	84	56	77	87; DNF	64	75	443	356
84	Florian von Linde (H); Tobias Steffens	Germany	42	76	76	79	87; DNF	87; DNS	447	360
85	Börje Larsson (H); Carl-Fredrik Larsson	Sweden	85	48	79	81	81	74	448	363
86	Mariusz Modrzynski (H); Sebastián Moras	Poland	87; DNF	83	86	84	82	76	498	411

Legend: BFD – Black flag disqualification; DNC – Did not come to the starting area; DNF – Did not finish; DNS – Did not start; DSQ – Disqualified;
