= 2006 Star World Championships =

The 2006 Star World Championship was held at the St. Francis Yacht Club in San Francisco, United States between September 27 and October 8, 2006. The championship was administered by the World Sailing.

== Results ==
Results of individual races
Rank	Crew	Nation	1	2	3	4	5	6	Net
Gold medal	Hamish Pepper; Carl Williams	New Zealand	1	20^{†}	4	1	5	8	19
Silver medal	Robert Scheidt; Bruno Prada	Brazil	6	4	13^{†}	5	3	4	22
Bronze medal	Xavier Rohart; Pascal Rambeau	France	14^{†}	5	5	2	8	3	23
4	Andy Horton; Brad Nichol	United States	2	9	1	32^{†} (ZFP)	9	9	30
5	Fredrik Lööf; Anders Ekström	Sweden	33^{†}	13	12	13	1	1	40
6	Rohan Lord; Miles Addy	New Zealand	3	2	10	11	46^{†}	14	40
7	Flavio Marazzi; Martin Kozaczek	Switzerland	4	1	14	15^{†}	12	15	46
8	Mateusz Kusznierewicz; Dominik Życki	Poland	17	10	OCS^{†}	21 (ZFP)	4	7	59
9	Jim Buckingham; Mike Dorgan	United States	13	23	19	4	2	49^{†}	61
10	Marc Pickel; Ingo Borkowski	Germany	43^{†}	35	2	9	20	5	71
11	Mark Mendelblatt; Mark Strube	United States	25	8	16	34^{†} (ZFP)	10	13	72
12	Diego Negri; Luigi Viale	Italy	62^{†}	14	7	37	11	6	75
13	Luca Modena; Michele Marchesini	Italy	51^{†}	12	6	14	26	19	77
14	Iain Murray; Andrew Palfrey	Australia	7	30^{†}	17	23	21	11	79
15	Daniel Stegmeier; Beat Stegmeier	Switzerland	18	3	18	30^{†} (ZFP)	19	41	88
16	Afonso Domingo; Bernardo Santos	Portugal	29	7	29	6	47^{†}	17	88
17	Torben Grael; Marcelo Ferreira	Brazil	15	31	15	42^{†}	17	10	88
18	John Dane III; Austin Sperry	United States	34^{†}	17	9	16	24	24	90
19	Luca Simeone; Ferdinando Colaninno	Italy	39^{†}	22	24	12	13	20	91
20	George Szabo; Eric Monroe	United States	23	28	8	26	31^{†}	18	103
21	Mark Reynolds; Hal Haenel	United States	44	26	3	10	22	DNF^{†}	105
22	Francesco Bruni; Gilberto Nobili	Italy	42^{†}	21	34	20 (ZFP)	14	16	105
23	Fabian Mac Gowan; Federico Engelhard	Argentina	10	33	28	20	18	34^{†}	109
24	Iain Percy; Steve Mitchell	United Kingdom	36	16	OCS^{†}	16 (ZFP)	42	2	112
25	Rick Merriman; Rick Peters	United States	35^{†}	24	21	29	32	12	118
26	Bill Buchan Jr. Erik Bentzen	United States	26	6	DSQ^{†}	22	40	26	120
27	John Maccausland; Bob Schofield	United States	54^{†}	32	22	24	7	37	122
28	Arthur Anosov; David Caesar	Ukraine	30	27	20	60^{†}	25	25	127
29	Juan Kouyoumdjian; Nicolas Rosas	Argentina	55^{†}	46	22 (RDG)	28	6	27	129
30	Marin Lovrovic, Jr; Marin Lovrovic, Sr	Croatia	19	18	25	65^{†}	45	23	130
31	Alberto Barovier; Umberto Coppola	Italy	22	39^{†}	35	38	23	29	147
32	Henrik Dannesboe; Igor Kaptourovitch	Switzerland	DNF^{†}	29	32	18	36	35	150
33	Peter Vessella; J Darin Jensen	United States	31	45	11	52	16	DNF^{†}	155
34	Peter Conde; Andrew Hunn	Australia	40	19	30	58^{†}	44	22	155
35	Steven Kelly; William Holowesko	Bahamas	21	40	36	61^{†}	27	32	156
36	Erik Lidecis; Michael Marzahl	United States	28	25	23	55^{†}	53	31	160
37	Andrew Macdonald; Brian Fatih	United States	49	28 (ZFP)	OCS^{†}	48	15	21	161
38	Steve Gould; Greg Sieck	United States	5	44	45	40	50^{†}	30	164
39	Maurice O'Connell; Edmund Peel	Ireland	11	11	OCS^{†}	50	59	33	164
40	Christoph Gautschi; Jurg Konig	Switzerland	9	42	42	51^{†}	38	45	176
41	Kunio Suzuki; Daichi Wada	Japan	20	41	OCS^{†}	36	52	28	177
42	Ingvar Krook; Andreas Fuerer	Sweden	57^{†}	43	26	25	29	57	180
43	Brian Cramer; Tyler Bjorn	Canada	37	36	38	45^{†} (ZFP)	28	44	183
44	Karl Anderson; Edward Morey	United States	46^{†}	37	37	44	30	43	191
45	Alex Fox; Dunnery Best	Canada	12	55	52	33	41	DNF^{†}	193
46	Erik Broekhof; Erik Veldhuizen	Netherlands	24	49	OCS^{†}	43	43	38	197
47	Bill Allen; Brad Lichter	United States	61^{†}	51	33	40 (ZFP)	37	36	197
48	William Fields; Richard Burgess	United States	8	38	46	62^{†} (ZFP)	58	52	202
49	Tibor Tenke; Jozsef Bendicsek	Hungary	32	34	31	67^{†} (ZFP)	OCS	39	203
50	Philippe Kahn; Joe Londrigan	United States	41	47	OCS^{†}	30	39	48	205
51	Foss Miller; Greg Newhall	United States	16	48	40	59^{†}	55	50	209
52	Richard Pearce; Paul Manning	United States	47	54^{†}	48	34	35	54	218
53	Rodrigo Zuazola; Marcos Fuentes	Chile	56	OCS^{†}	41	46	34	55	232
54	Robert Forintos; András Komm	Hungary	27	58^{†}	53	41	57	56	234
55	Eizens Cepurnieks; Aleksander Muzicenko	Latvia	58^{†}	52	43	35	62	46	234
56	Nedko Vassilev; Paul Erikson	Bulgaria	60^{†}	53	44	39	51	47	234
57	Antonio Tamburini; Renzo Ricci	Italy	38	57	OCS^{†}	67 (ZFP)	33	42	237
58	Brian Huse; Scott Killam	Canada	48	56^{†}	47	44 (ZFP)	49	51	238
59	Jock Kohlhas; David Bolles	United States	52	50	39	56	61^{†}	49	246
60	Roberto Tomasini Grinover; Walter Passegger	Austria	45	62^{†}	50	47	60	59	261
61	Vicente Gimeno; Luis Felipe Herman	Chile	53	59^{†}	51	45	54	58	261
62	Steve Johnson; Stephan Cohen	New Zealand	59	64	55	67^{†} (ZFP)	48	61	277
63	Brian O'Mahoney; David Pleman	United States	50	61	54	67^{†} (ZFP)	56	60	281
64	Derek Decouteau; Joseph Donnette	United States	64	60	49	66 (ZFP)	OCS^{†}	53	292
65	Dennis Burgess; Dave Kershaw	Canada	63	63	56	BFD^{†}	63	62	307
66	Scot Merrick; Crystine Lee	United States	65^{†}	65	57	63	64	63	312

== See also ==
- Star World Championship
