= Sailing at the 2012 Summer Olympics – Star =

Men’s Star at the Games of the XXX Olympiad
- Line drawing of the Star
- Venue: Weymouth and Portland National Sailing Academy
- Dates: 29 July – 5 August
- Competitors: 32 from 16 nations
- Teams: 16 (boats)

Medalists
1st place, gold medalist(s)		Fredrik Lööf; Max Salminen	Sweden
2nd place, silver medalist(s)		Iain Percy; Andrew Simpson	Great Britain
3rd place, bronze medalist(s)		Robert Scheidt; Bruno Prada	Brazil

The men's Star was a sailing event on the Sailing at the 2012 Summer Olympics program in Weymouth and Portland National Sailing Academy. Eleven races (the last one being a medal race) were scheduled and completed. 32 sailors, on 16 boats, from 16 nations competed. Ten boats qualified for the medal race on course area Nothe in front of Weymouth, where each position scored double points.

== Schedule ==
●	Practice race	●	Race on West	●	Race on South	●	Medal race on Nothe

Date	July						August											
Date	26 Thu	27 Fri	28 Sat	29 Sun	30 Mon	31 Tue	1 Wed	2 Thu	3 Fri	4 Sat	5 Sun	6 Mon	7 Tue	8 Wed	9 Thu	10 Fri	11 Sat	12 Sun
Men’s Star			●	2	2	2	Spare day	2	2	Spare day	MR							

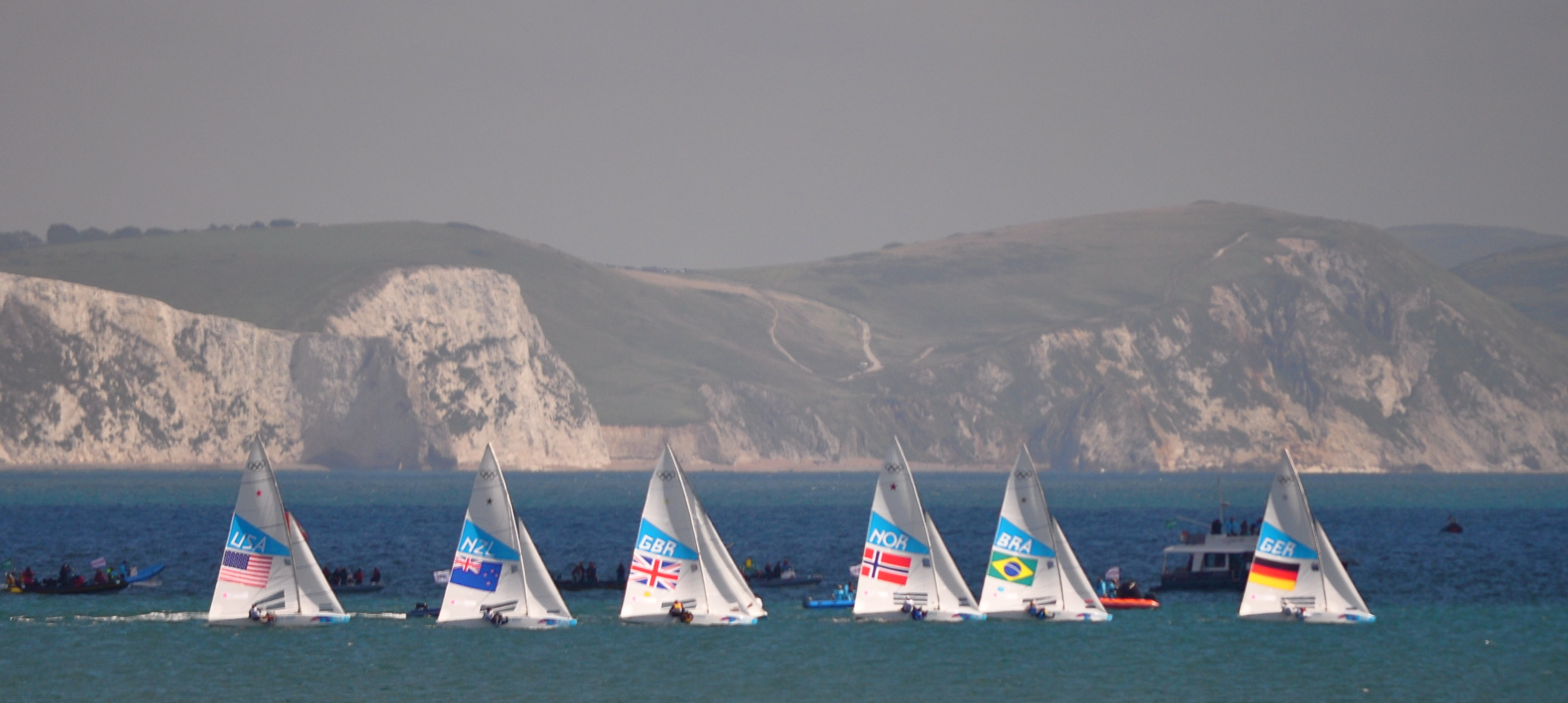
Stars during the 2012 Summer Olympics

== Course areas and course configurations ==
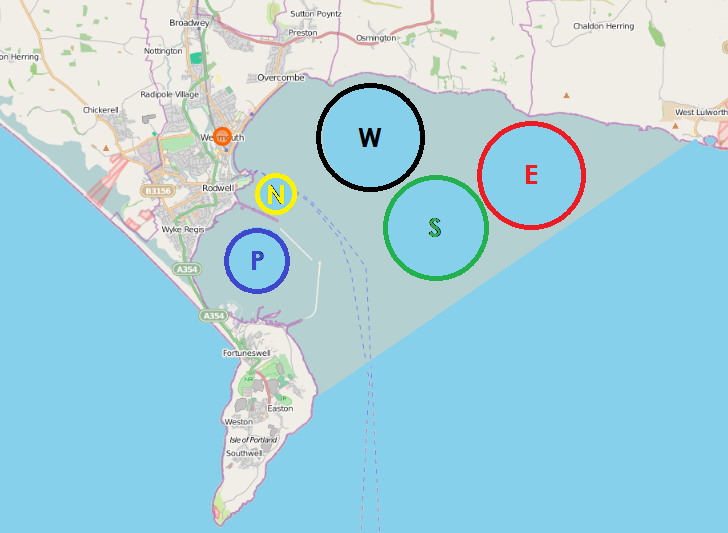
Course areas: Portland (P) Nothe (N) West (W) / South (S) East (E)

For the Star course areas Nothe, West, and South were used. The location (50° 36.18’ N 02° 25.98’ W) points to the center of the Nothe course area, the location (50° 37.18’ N 02° 23.55’ W) points to the center of the West course area and the location (50° 35.71’ N 02° 22.08’ W) points to the center of the South course area. The target time for the course was 60 – 75 minutes for the races and 30 minutes for the medal race. The race management could choose from many course configurations.

== Results ==
Results of individual races
Pos	Helmsman	Country	I	II	III	IV	V	VI	VII	VIII	IX	X	MR	Tot	Pts
Gold medal	Fredrik Lööf; Max Salminen	Sweden	10^{†}	4	4	1	5	3	4	1	2	6	2	42.0	32.0
Silver medal	Iain Percy; Andrew Simpson	Great Britain	11^{†}	2	3	2	1	2	1	2	4	1	16	45.0	34.0
Bronze medal	Robert Scheidt; Bruno Prada	Brazil	4	1	9^{†}	6	2	1	3	5	1	3	14	49.0	40.0
4	Eivind Melleby; Petter Mørland Pedersen	Norway	7	5	2	4	16^{†}	11	8	4	7	5	10	79.0	63.0
5	Hamish Pepper; Jim Turner	New Zealand	15^{†}	7	1	13	6	5	9	8	8	9	4	85.0	70.0
6	Robert Stanjek; Frithjof Kleen	Germany	6	9	8	7	4	6	BFD 17^{†}	11	9	4	6	87.0	70.0
7	Mark Mendelblatt; Brian Fatih	United States	5	14^{†}	5	3	8	9	5	10	3	11	12	85.0	71.0
8	Mateusz Kusznierewicz; Dominik Życki	Poland	9	3	12	10	3	4	2	9	13^{†}	2	18	85.0	72.0
9	Xavier Rohart; Pierre-Alexis Ponsot	France	1	13	10	11	12	14^{†}	11	6	6	8	8	100.0	86.0
10	Peter O'Leary; David Burrows	Ireland	2	6	14	5	11	12	DSQ 17^{†}	7	11	7	20	112.0	95.0
11	Michael Hestbæk; Claus Olesen	Denmark	12	11	13	14^{†}	13	7	6	3	14	10		103.0	89.0
12	Richard Clarke; Tyler Bjorn	Canada	16	10	6	8	10	OCS 17^{†}	13	12	5	13		110.0	93.0
13	Flavio Marazzi; Enrico De Maria	Switzerland	13	8	11	9	15	8	10	13	15	16^{†}		118.0	102.0
14	Aimilios Papathanasiou; Antonis Tsotras	Greece	3	16	7	12	7	15	BFD 17^{†}	DSQ 17	OCS 17	12		123.0	106.0
15	Afonso Domingos; Frederico Melo	Portugal	14	15	15	16^{†}	9	10	7	14	10	14		124.0	108.0
16	Marin Lovrović Jr. Dan Lovrović	Croatia	8	12	16^{†}	15	14	13	12	15	12	15		132.0	116.0

Scoring system: low-point system; Source:
Legend: – Qualified for medal race(s); DSQ – Disqualified; OCS – On the course side of the starting line; † – Discarded race not counted in the overall result;

== Daily standings ==
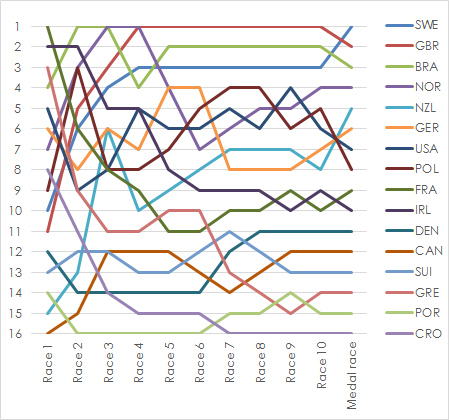
Graph showing the daily standings in the men’s Star during the 2012 Summer Olympics
