= Sailing at the 2008 Summer Olympics – Star =

Men’s Star at the Games of the XXIX Olympiad
- Line drawing of the Star
- Venue: Qingdao International Sailing Centre
- Dates: First race: 15 August 2008; Last race: 21 August 2008
- Competitors: 32 from 16 nations
- Teams: 16 boats

Medalists
1st place, gold medalist(s)		Iain Percy; Andrew Simpson	Great Britain
2nd place, silver medalist(s)		Robert Scheidt; Bruno Prada	Brazil
3rd place, bronze medalist(s)		Fredrik Lööf; Anders Ekström	Sweden

The men's Star was a sailing event on the sailing at the 2008 Summer Olympics program in Qingdao International Sailing Centre. Eleven races (last one a medal race) were scheduled and completed. 32 sailors, on 16 boats, from 16 nations competed. Ten boats qualified for the medal race.

== Race schedule ==
●	Practice race	●	Race on Yellow	●	Race on Pink	●	Medal race on Yellow

Date	August																	
Date	7 Thu	8 Fri	9 Sat	10 Sun	11 Mon	12 Tue	13 Wed	14 Thu	15 Fri	16 Sat	17 Sun	18 Mon	19 Tue	20 Wed	21 Thu	22 Fri	23 Sat	24 Sun
Men's Star								PR	S1	S2,3	S4	S5,6,7	No wind	S8,9,10	MR			

== Course areas and course configurations ==
For the Star course areas A (Yellow) and E (Pink) were used. The location (36°1'26"’N, 120°26'52"E) points to the center of the 0.6nm radius Yellow course area and the location (36°2'44"N, 120°28'9"E) points to the center of the 0.75nm radius Pink course area. The target time for the course was about 60 minutes for the races and 30 minutes for the medal race. The race management could choose from several course configurations.

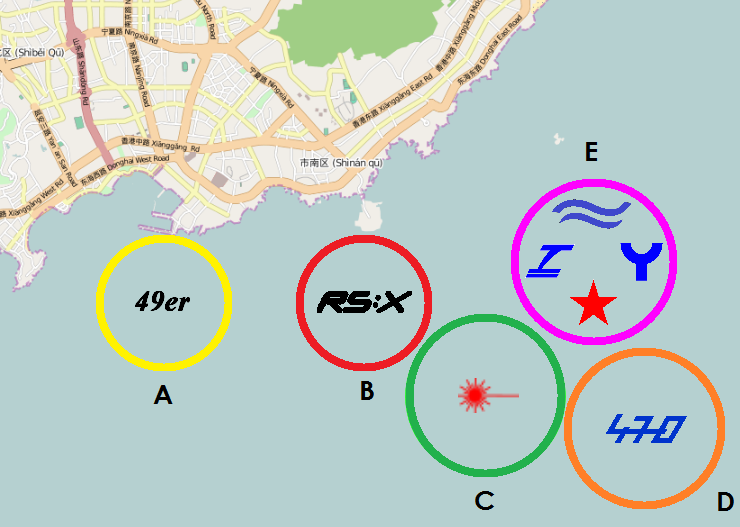
Course Areas

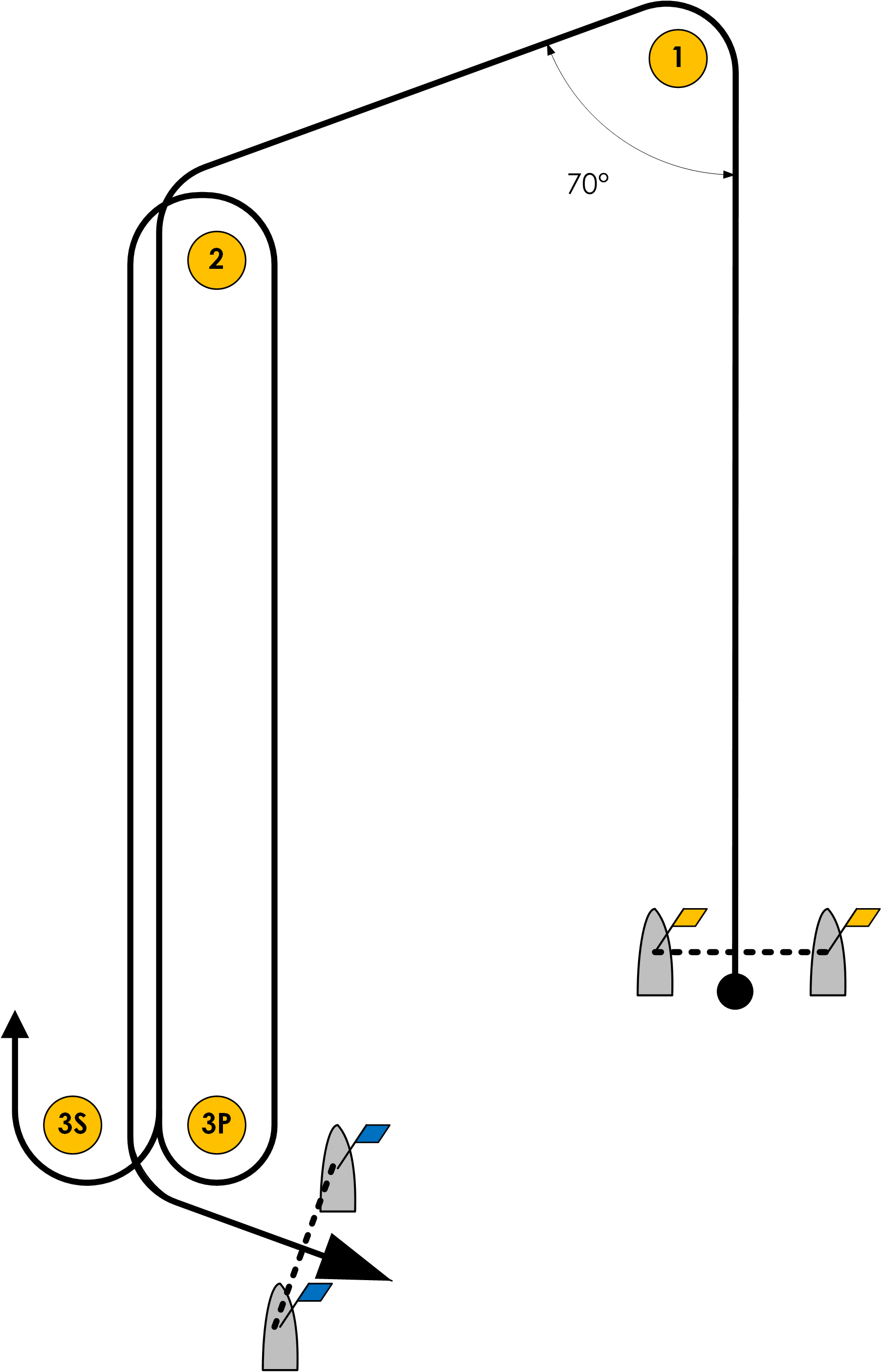
70° Trapezoid Outer Course (O)

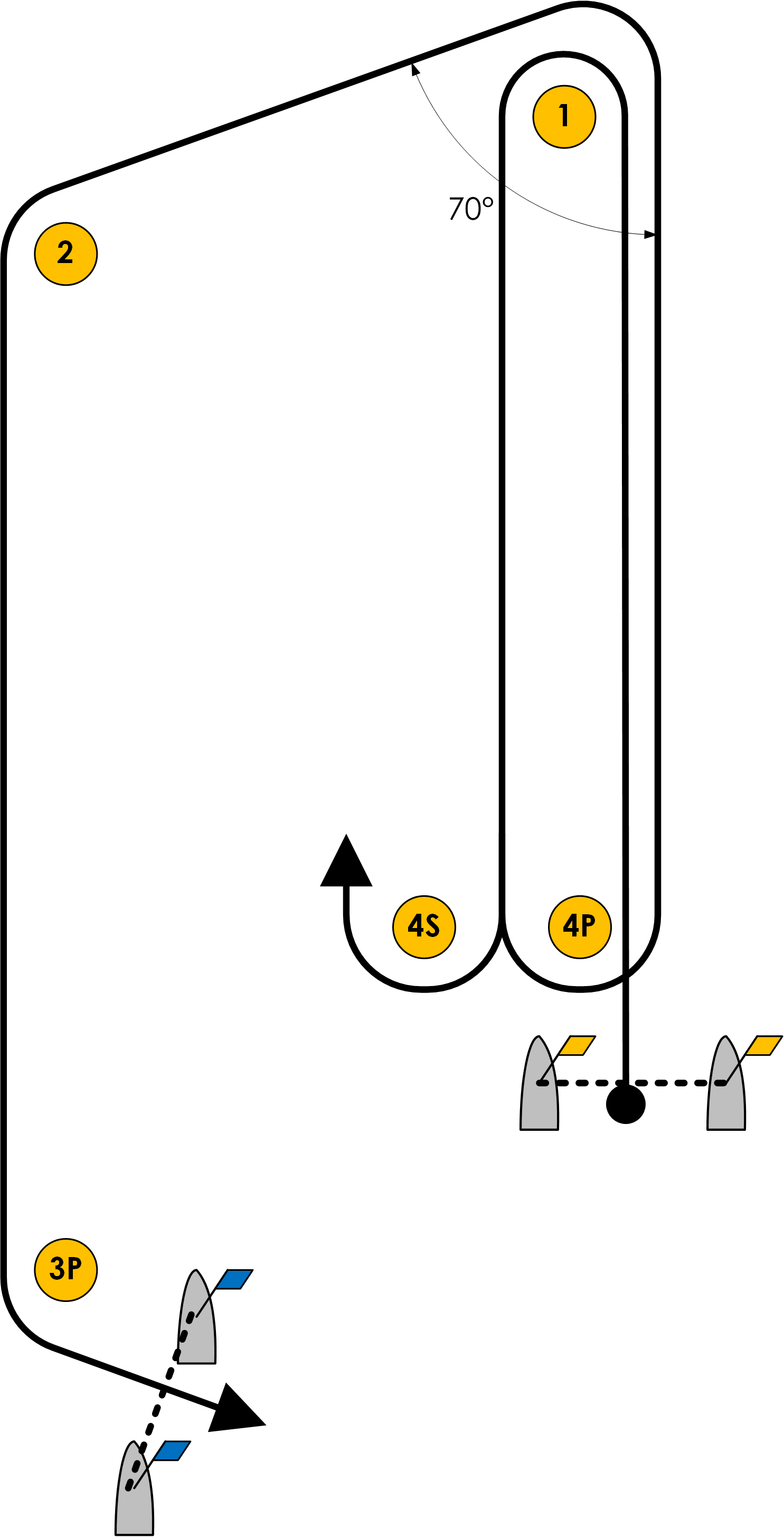
70° Trapezoid Inner Course (I)

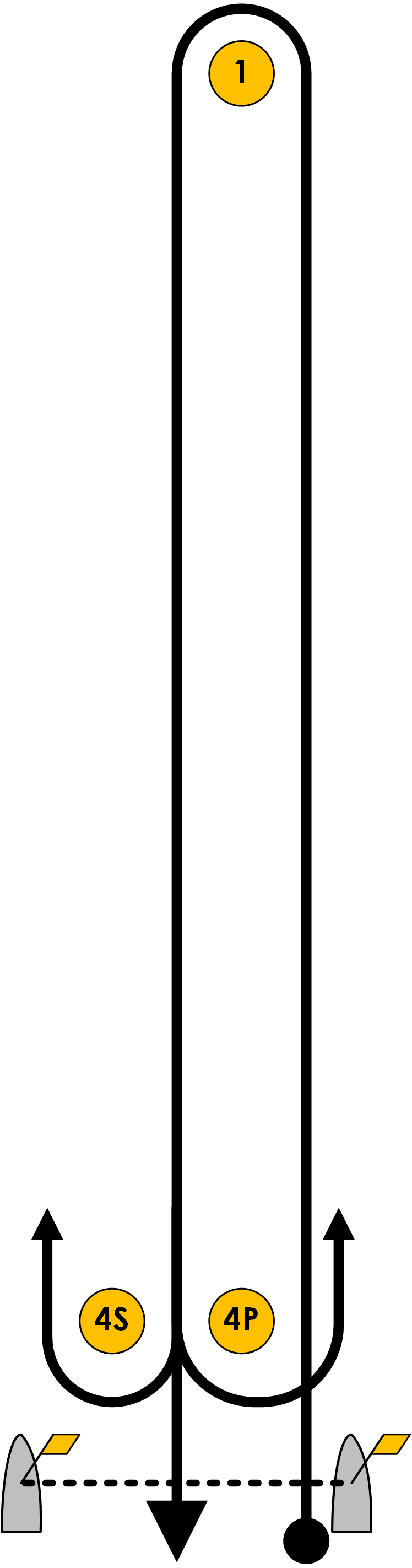
Windward - Leeward Course (W)

=== Outer courses ===
- O1: Start – 1 – 2 – 3s/3p – 2 – 3p – Finish
- O2: Start – 1 – 2 – 3s/3p – 2 – 3s/3p – 2 – 3p – Finish
- O3: Start – 1 – 2 – 3s/3p – 2 – 3s/3p – 2 – 3s/3p – 2 – 3p – Finish

=== Inner courses ===
- I1: Start – 1 – 4s/4p – 1 – 2 – 3p – Finish
- I2: Start – 1 – 4s/4p – 1 – 4s/4p – 1 – 2 – 3p – Finish
- I3: Start – 1 – 4s/4p – 1 – 4s/4p – 1 – 4s/4p – 1 – 2 – 3p – Finish

=== Windward-leeward courses ===
- W2: Start – 1 – 4s/4p – 1 – Finish
- W3: Start – 1 – 4s/4p – 1 – 4s/4p – 1 – Finish
- W4: Start – 1 – 4s/4p – 1 – 4s/4p – 1 – 4s/4p – 1 – Finish

== Weather conditions ==
In the lead up to the Olympics many questioned the choice of Qingdao as a venue with very little predicted wind. During the races the wind was pretty light and quite unpredictable. For the Star competition several races had to be postponed to the next day and the spare day had to be used.

== Final results ==
Results of individual races
Pos	Helmsman	Country	I	II	III	IV	V	VI	VII	VIII	IX	X	MR	Tot	Pts
Gold medal	Iain Percy; Andrew Simpson	Great Britain	7	13^{†}	3	5	8	2	1	1	2	6	5	58.0	45.0
Silver medal	Robert Scheidt; Bruno Prada	Brazil	10	11^{†}	6	1	9	10	2	3	3	3	3	64.0	53.0
Bronze medal	Fredrik Lööf; Anders Ekström	Sweden	1	4	15^{†}	3	6	1	8	2	1	7	10	68.0	53.0
4	Mateusz Kusznierewicz; Dominik Życki	Poland	5	6	8	2	10	9	3	5	9	13^{†}	1	72.0	59.0
5	Flavio Marazzi; Enrico De Maria	Switzerland	9	7	9	9	5	5	6	11^{†}	4	1	2	70.0	59.0
6	Xavier Rohart; Pascal Rambeau	France	12^{†}	1	5	4	7	6	9	9	8	2	9	81.0	69.0
7	Marc Pickel; Ingo Borkowski	Germany	2	14^{†}	1	8	3	8	14	10	6	10	4	84.0	70.0
8	Afonso Domingos; Bernardo Santos	Portugal	3	3	10	OCS 17^{†}	13	3	5	7	7	9	6	89.0	72.0
9	Hamish Pepper; Carl Williams	New Zealand	4	9	2	11	1	12	11	13^{†}	5	11	7	93.0	80.0
10	Diego Negri; Luigi Viale	Italy	13^{†}	8	12	7	11	7	7	6	13	5	8	105.0	92.0
11	John Dane III; Austin Sperry	United States	8	2	4	12	15	15	16^{†}	16	10	4		102.0	86.0
12	Hans Spitzauer; Christian Nehammer	Austria	14^{†}	10	11	6	14	4	12	4	12	14		101.0	87.0
13	Peter O'Leary; Stephen Milne	Ireland	6	12	7	10	12	13^{†}	13	8	11	12		104.0	91.0
14	Iain Murray; Andrew Palfrey	Australia	11	15^{†}	13	15	2	11	10	12	14	8		111.0	96.0
15	Marin Lovrović Jr. Siniša Mikuličić	Croatia	15^{†}	5	14	13	4	14	4	14	15	15		113.0	98.0
16	Li Hongquan; Wang He	China	16^{†}	16	16	14	16	16	15	15	16	16		156.0	140.0

Scoring system: low-point system;
Legend: – Qualified for medal race(s); BFD – Black flag disqualification; DNE – Non excludable disqualification; DNF – Did not finish; DPI – Discretionary penalty imposed; OCS – On the course side of the starting line; † – Discarded race not counted in the overall result;

== Daily standings ==
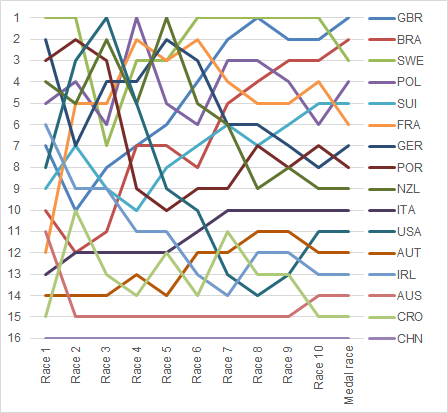
Graph showing the daily standings in the Star during the 2008 Summer Olympics
