= Claus Olesen =

Danish sailor

Personal information
- Full name: Claus Elsborg Olesen
- Nationality: Denmark
- Born: 21 August 1974 (age 51) Galten, Denmark
- Height: 1.93 m (6 ft 4 in)
- Weight: 105 kg (231 lb)

Sport

Sailing career
- Class: Keelboat
- Club: Kaløvig Bådelaug
Medal record
Men's sailing
Representing Denmark
World Championships
Bronze medal – third place	2012 Hyères	Star

Claus Elsborg Olesen (born 21 August 1974) is a Danish retired sailor, who specialized in two-person keelboat (Star) class. He represented Denmark in the Star class in two editions of the Olympic Games (2004 and 2012), and also shared bronze medals with his partner Michael Hestbæk at the 2012 Star World Championships in Hyères, France. Olesen has also been training throughout most of his sporting career for Kaløvig Bådelaug Yacht Club in Århus.

Olesen made his official debut at the 2004 Summer Olympics in Athens, where he paired up with Nicklas Holm in the Star class. On 16 August 2004 Olesen had almost been injured and charged in a road accident, when his partner Holm struck and killed a British pedestrian while speeding in his car on the way to witness the Danish handball team's prelim match. Being overshadowed and cleared by the accident charges, the Danish duo recorded a net score of 83 points to establish a satisfying ninth-place finish in a fleet of seventeen boats, trailing behind Bermuda (led by four-time Olympian Peter Bromby) by a single mark.

Eight years after competing in his last Olympics, Olesen qualified as a 38-year-old veteran and a crew member for the Danish squad in the Star class at the 2012 Summer Olympics in London by placing third and receiving a berth from the World Championships in Hyères, France. Teaming with his new partner and four-time Olympian Michael Hestbæk in the opening series, the Danish duo occupied an eleventh spot with a net score of 89, missing out a chance to compete for the medal race by nine points behind French sailors Pierre-Alexis Ponsot and Xavier Rohart.
