= Wang He =

Wang He may refer to:

- Wang He (skier) (born 1983), Chinese freestyle skier
- Wang He (sailor) (born 1988), Chinese sports sailor
