= Stephen Milne (sailor) =

Irish sailor

Personal information
- Full name: Stephen Milne
- Nationality: Ireland
- Born: 25 July 1985 (age 40) Belfast, Northern Ireland, United Kingdom
- Height: 1.90 m (6 ft 3 in)
- Weight: 105 kg (231 lb)

Sailing career
- Sport: Sailing
- Club: Royal Belfast Yacht Club
- Class: Keelboat

Stephen Milne (born 25 July 1985) is an Irish former sailor, who specialized in the keelboat (Star) class. Together with his partner and Cork native Peter O'Leary, he was named one of the country's top sailors in the all-male keelboat for the 2008 Summer Olympics, finishing in a distant thirteenth position. Milne trained most of his sporting career at the Royal Belfast Yacht Club.

Milne competed for the Irish sailing squad, as a crew member in the Star class, at the 2008 Summer Olympics in Beijing. Three months before, the Olympic Steering Group, together with the Irish Sailing Association recommended and unanimously selected him and O'Leary over the quota recipients Max Treacy and Anthony Shanks at the conclusion of the Star Worlds, proving that they had the best chance of success in the Olympic regatta. The Irish duo started the series off with a stellar top-six mark, before a random wave of substandard outcomes towards the final stretch, however, swept both Milne and O'Leary away from the medal round to a thirteenth overall spot with 91 net points.
