= Craig Monk =

New Zealand sailor

Olympic medal record

Representing New Zealand

Men's sailing
| Bronze medal – third place | 1992 Barcelona | Finn |

Craig John Monk (born 23 May 1967 in Stratford, New Zealand) is a competitive sailor who won a bronze medal in the Finn class at the 1992 Olympic Games in Barcelona. Monk also competed at the 1996 Summer Olympics in Atlanta after narrowly beating future America's Cup skipper Dean Barker for selection to the New Zealand team. He finished 13th.

Monk has since been extensively involved in America's Cup racing. He was recruited as a grinder by Russell Coutts for the successful challenge in 1995 and the subsequent defence in 2000. He moved to One World for the 2003 Louis Vuitton Cup. Monk was the sailing team manager of BMW Oracle Racing from 2003 until the 2007 America's Cup, and was a grinder for Artemis Racing in the 34th America's Cup. He won a silver medal in the 2009 Star World Championships alongside Hamish Pepper.
