= Christian Nehammer =

Austrian sailor

Personal information
- Full name: Hans-Christian Nehammer
- Born: 26 May 1976 (age 50) Salzburg, Austria
- Height: 1.90 m (6 ft 3 in)
- Weight: 108 kg (238 lb)

Sailing career
- Sport: Sailing
- Club: Union-Yacht-Club Attersee
- Class: Star
Medal record
Sailing
World Championships
Bronze medal – third place	2021 Kiel	Star class
European Championships
Bronze medal – third place	2020 Riva del Garda	Star class
Bronze medal – third place	2021 Split	Star class

Hans-Christian Nehammer (born 26 May 1976) is an Austrian sailor, who specializes in the Star class. Together with his partner and five-time Olympian Hans Spitzauer, he was named one of the country's top sailors in the Star event for the 2008 Summer Olympics, finishing in twelfth place. A seven-time Austrian champion in his pet event, Nehammer sailed all of his sporting career for the Union-Yacht-Club Attersee in Attersee.

== Career ==
Looking to compete in the 2008 Summer Olympics, Nehammer and skipper Spitzauer missed the Olympic cut at the 2007 ISAF Sailing World Championships in Cascais, but rebounded from their flimsy outcome to punch the last of the four remaining tickets vying for qualification with a successful top 16 finish at the 2008 Star World Championship in Miami.

Nehammer, then 32 years old, competed as a crew member together with and Spitzauer for Austria in the Star event at the 2008 Summer Olympics in Beijing. The Austrian duo accumulated a triad of top-six marks throughout the ten-race course, but a disastrous feat on the last leg slipped their chances away from the medal round to the twelfth overall spot with 87 net points.

Christian Nehammer competed as skipper in the Star class between 2009 and 2019 in many Star European Championship and Star World Championship events, scoring several top 10 places together with Florian Urban. In 2019, Christian Nehammer switched back to sailing as a crew and won the Eastern Hemisphere Championship in his home waters together with Augie Diaz. In 2020, Spitzauer and Nehammer finished 3rd at the Star European Championship in Riva del Garda. In the next European Championship in Split, Nehammer repeated the achievement, this time with Diaz. Later in the year, Spitzauer and Nehammer managed to claim the 3rd position at the World Championship in Kiel.

== Personal life ==
In parallel to his sports career Christian Nehammer finished his studies on economics at the University of Innsbruck in 2002.

== Achievements ==
As of 27 September 2015

Year	Competition	Venue	Position	Event
2007	Kiel Week	Kiel, Germany	1st	Star class
2008	Olympic Games	Qingdao, China	12th	Star class
2019	Eastern Hemisphere Championship	Attersee, Austria	1st	Star class
2020	Star European Championship	Riva del Garda, Italy	3rd	Star class
2021	Star European Championship	Split, Croatia	3rd	Star class
2021	Star World Championship	Kiel, Germany	3rd	Star class
