= Carl Whiting =

New Zealand sailor

Carl (Tiny) Whiting, born 1981 in Auckland (previously known as Carl Williams), is a New Zealand sailor who has competed at the Summer Olympics and in multiple America's Cups.

== Sailing ==
His mother is well-known sailing tutor Penny Whiting. Between 1995 and 1998 Whiting was part of the Royal New Zealand Yacht Squadron youth training scheme.

Whiting joined Team New Zealand as a trainee and reserve at age 16. He then sailed with Team New Zealand in their unsuccessful 2003 America's Cup before joining Oracle Racing for the 2007 Louis Vuitton Cup and 2010 America's Cup campaign.

Whiting teamed up with Hamish Pepper in the Star class and together they won the 2006 Star World Championships and represented New Zealand at the 2008 Summer Olympics, finishing ninth.

In 2009 he took up cycling and entered a team into the Tour of Southland while also working with Artemis Racing in the TP52 class.

== Cycling ==
Whiting launched and managed Pure Black Racing, New Zealand's first international professional road cycling team, from 2010 to 2013. The team raced in USA, Canada, Singapore, New Zealand and Australia in 2011 and '12, including competing in the 2012 UCI Asia Tour.

== Jiu-Jitsu ==
Whiting won first place in the blue belt, Master 1, ultra-heavy category at the World Master Brazilian jiu-jitsu 2014 Championship in California.

== Sailing business ==
In 2020, Whiting and his wife Jasmine purchased the 55 ft yacht Emotional Rescue, which was the first monohull boat to win the PIC Coastal Classic in 1989. Their family-run business, Whiting Sailing, offers private charters, private sailing lessons and learn-to-sail courses in Auckland.
