= Hamish Pepper =

New Zealand sailor

Hamish Pepper (born 13 May 1971) is a New Zealand sailor. He competed at the 1996, 2004, 2008 and 2012 Summer Olympics.

Pepper was born in Auckland and attended Westlake Boys High School.

Sailing in a Laser, Pepper finished 10th at the 1996 Olympics and 7th in 2004. Pepper then moved to the Star and sailed with Carl Williams at the 2008 Olympics, finishing 9th. Pepper and Jim Turner finished 5th at the 2012 Olympics.

Pepper has also competed in multiple Star World Championships, winning the 2006 Star World Championships with Carl Williams, finishing second with Craig Monk at the 2009 Star World Championships and 7th with Jim Turner in 2012.

He was a part of Team New Zealand's successful defence of the America's Cup in 2000. He was tactician on the team's 2003 America's Cup defence, but was removed when the team was down 0–3 to the eventual winners, Alinghi.

In 2009, Pepper was part of BMW Oracle Racing and skippered their boat during the Louis Vuitton Trophy Nice Côte d’Azur regatta. He sailed in the 2010 Louis Vuitton Trophy Dubai with Team Synergy.
