= Jim Turner (sailor) =

New Zealand sailor

Jim Turner (born 4 December 1975) is a New Zealand sailor. He was born in Bridport, England in 1975.

Turner was born in Bridport, Dorset, Great Britain in 1975. He sailed with GBR Challenge in the 2003 Louis Vuitton Cup and Areva Challenge in the 2007 Louis Vuitton Cup.

Since moving to New Zealand, Turner is a member of the Wakatere Boating Club who has now switched to Murrays Bay Sailing Club.

He competed and placed 5th overall at the 2012 Summer Olympics in London, in the Star Class together with Hamish Pepper. Together they finished seventh in the 2012 Star World Championships. They retired following the removal of the Star from future Olympic games.
