= Antonis Tsotras =

Greek sailor

Personal information
- Nationality: Greece
- Born: 9 May 1990 (age 36) Marousi, Greece
- Height: 1.84 m (6 ft 1/2 in)
- Weight: 95 kg (209 lb)

Sailing career
- Sport: Sailing
- Class(es): Dinghy, keelboat

Antonis Tsotras (Greek: Αντωνης Τσοτρας; born 9 May 1990) is a Greek sailor, who specialized in two-person keelboat (Star) class. He represented his nation Greece, along with his partner and five-time Olympian Aimilios Papathanasiou, at the 2012 Summer Olympics, and also obtained a top eight finish in two World Championships (2012 and 2014).

Tsotras qualified for the Greek sailing team in the Star class at the 2012 Summer Olympics in London by placing eighth and receiving a berth from his results at the World Championships in Hyères, France. Teaming with his partner and five-time Olympian Aimilios Papathanasiou in the opening series, the Greek duo started the race on a marvellous third-place effort, but fell short to fourteenth by a late caution with a net grade of 106.
