= Andy Horton =

Medal record

Sailing

Representing United States

Pan American Games
Gold medal – first place	1999 Winnipeg	Lightning class

Andy Horton, an American sailor and Olympic hopeful, is best known for his accomplishments Match racing and Star sailing.

== Biography ==
Andy began sailing on Lake Champlain in Vermont where he grew up. He went to prep school at Tabor Academy in Marion MA, after which he attended Hobart college where he studied biology and economics. In 1998 he graduated from Hobart as a 3 time All American. After college he has continued to competitively race sail boats. He has competed in everything from the Americas Cup to Bermuda Races and one design regattas. One of his latest projects was to try to win the right to be the representative to the Olympics in the Star class for the USA. In the end he did not win the trials, but was the top team for 2 years leading up to the regatta. The team was named 2006 Team of the Year by US SAILING, the national governing body of sailing in the United States.

== Regatta highlights ==
- Collegiate All American 1998, 1997, 1996
- Bermuda Race, USA (2001) 1st
- Match Racing World Championship, Italy (2004) 1st
- Match Racing World Championship, Russia (2003) 1st
- America's Cup, Spain (2007) 3rd with Luna Rossa Challenge
- LCYC Wednesday Night Series C2 (2019) 1st (as first mate of Slayride)
- Spectator (from Moth) of Slayride's victory in LCYC Wednesday Series Race B3 (2020)

Star Class

- Star World Championship (2006) 4th
- Pre-Olympic Regatta, China (2006) 1st
- European Championships, Germany (2006) 3rd
- Miami Olympic Classes Regatta (2006) 2nd
- Miami Olympic Classes Regatta (2005) 1st
- 2007 Star North American Champion Vancouver, BC
