= Anders Ekström =

Swedish sailor

Olympic medal record

Representing Sweden

Sailing
Bronze medal – third place	2008 Beijing	Star

Anders Ekström (born 16 January 1981) is a Swedish sailor who has participated in two Summer Olympics. He and Fredrik Lööf sailed together in the Star class, winning the Star world championship, the Star European championship, finishing 14th at Athens in 2004, and winning the bronze medal at Beijing in 2008.

== Achievements ==
As of 27 September 2015

Year	Competition	Venue	Position	Event
2002	Star World Championship	Marina del Rey, USA	14th	Star class
2003	ISAF Sailing World Championships	Cádiz, Spain	2nd	Star class
2004	Star World Championship	Gaeta, Italy	1st	Star class
2004	Olympic Games	Athens, Greece	12th	Star class
2005	Star World Championship	Buenos Aires, Argentina	4th	Star class
2006	Star World Championship	San Francisco, USA	5th	Star class
2007	ISAF Sailing World Championships	Cascais, Portugal	8th	Star class
2008	Star World Championship	Miami, USA	11th	Star class
2008	Olympic Games	Qingdao, China	3rd	Star class
2009	Star World Championship	Varberg, Sweden	61st	Star class
2013	RC44 World Championships	Lanzarote, Spain	8th	RC44 class
