= Peter O'Leary (sailor) =

Irish sailor

Peter O'Leary (born 29 March 1983) in Cork is an Irish sailor. At the 2008 Summer Olympics he competed in the men's star class, with Stephen Milne, and at the 2012 Summer Olympics in the Men's Star class alongside David Burrows.
