= Wang He (sailor) =

Chinese sailor (born 1988)

Wang He (born 9 November 1988 in Beijing) is a male Chinese sports sailor who competed for Team China at the 2008 Summer Olympics.
