= Mate Arapov =

Croatian sailor (born 1976)

Mate Arapov (born 25 February 1976 in Split) is a Croatian sailor who competes in the Laser, Finn and Star classes.

A member of JK Mornar sailing club, Arapov sailed for Croatia in the Laser class at the 2000 and 2004 Summer Olympics. In 2000 he placed 43rd in the final standings, and in 2004 he was 14th overall.

Arapov was named Split Sportsman of the Year in 2004.
