= Andrew Simpson (sailor) =

British competitive sailor (1976–2013)

Personal information
- Nickname: Bart
- Born: 17 December 1976 Chertsey, Surrey, England
- Died: 9 May 2013 (aged 36) San Francisco, California, U.S.
- Height: 185 cm (6 ft 1 in)
- Weight: 104 kg (229 lb)

Sailing career
- Sport: Sailing
- Club: Hunters Hill Sailing Club, Woolwich
Medal record
Representing Great Britain
Olympic Games
Gold medal – first place	2008 Beijing	Star
Silver medal – second place	2012 London	Star
World Championships
Gold medal – first place	2010 Rio de Janeiro	Star
Silver medal – second place	2012 Hyères	Star
Bronze medal – third place	2003 Cádiz	Finn
Bronze medal – third place	2007 Cascais	Star
European Championships
Silver medal – second place	2001 Malcesine	Finn
Silver medal – second place	2009 Kiel	Star
Bronze medal – third place	2007 Malcesine	Star
- Updated on 10 May 2013

Andrew James "Bart" Simpson MBE (17 December 1976 – 9 May 2013), was an English sailor who won a gold medal at the 2008 Summer Olympics in Beijing, as crew for skipper Iain Percy in the Star class representing Great Britain. Simpson died in the capsize of the catamaran he was crewing on 9 May 2013, while training for the America's Cup in San Francisco Bay.

== Career ==
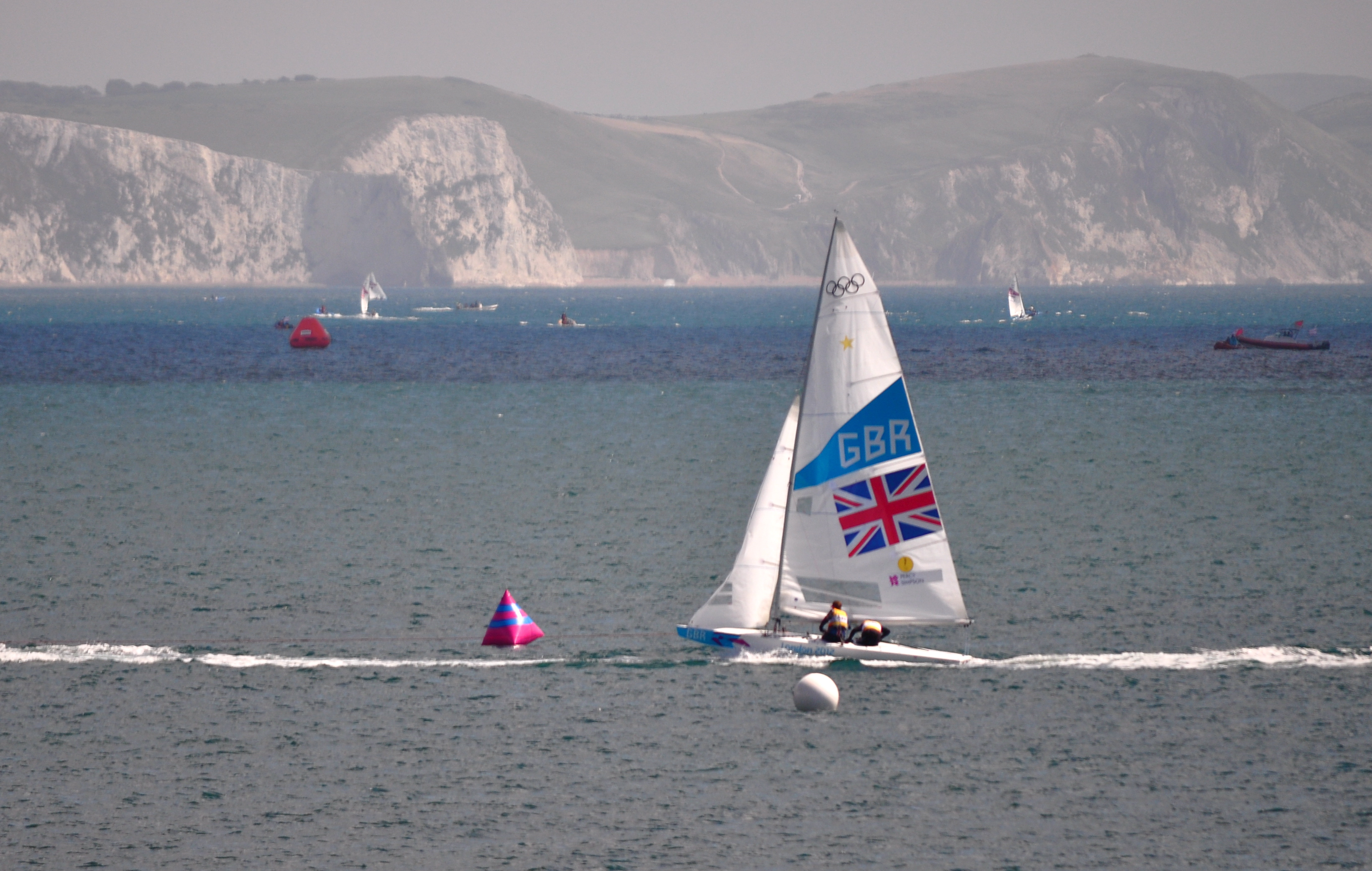
Simpson and Iain Percy competing in the 2012 Summer Olympics

Simpson started his competitive sailing career in the Laser class, before switching to the heavier Finn class. He claimed the bronze medal at the 2003 ISAF Sailing World Championships in Cádiz in the Finn class; his training partner Ben Ainslie took the gold, with Great Britain topping the medal table. He sailed with +39 Challenge in the 2007 Louis Vuitton Cup.

Simpson then moved to the two-man Star class, partnering lifelong friend Iain Percy; they won a bronze medal at the 2007 ISAF Sailing World Championships in Cascais to qualify for the 2008 Summer Olympics. The pair won the gold medal in Beijing in the Star class. After winning the Olympic gold, Percy and Simpson took a break from Star sailing and were in the TeamORIGIN afterguard for the 2010 America's Cup. In 2010, he and Percy won the Star World Championship in Rio de Janeiro.

Simpson and Percy made the podium in every meeting of the ISAF Sailing World Cup in 2012, including gold at the Hyères French World Cup regatta. They competed at the 2012 Olympic Games, again in the Star class, failing to defend their title despite being in the lead throughout the competition, but winning the silver medal. After the Star class was removed from the Olympic sailing disciplines, Simpson turned his attention to the America's Cup, moving to San Francisco to train in March 2013. He was known for his athleticism, and for his attention to detail in preparing the boat to obtain the best possible performance.

=== Death ===
Simpson was killed on 9 May 2013, during training for the 34th America's Cup, when the Swedish Artemis Racing team yacht he was aboard capsized near Treasure Island in San Francisco Bay. The yacht, a 72-foot catamaran with a rigid, wing-like sail, was turning downwind (bearing away) when it flipped over and broke into pieces. Simpson was trapped underneath its hulls for approximately ten minutes, and attempts to revive him by doctors afloat and subsequently ashore were unsuccessful. The cause of the accident is unknown. An investigation was initiated by the United States Coast Guard which involved San Francisco police and the America's Cup management.

John Derbyshire, performance director of the Royal Yachting Association, described Simpson as "a huge inspiration to others, both within the British Sailing Team and across the nation". Other tributes were paid by fellow sailors Ainslie and Percy, Olympian sport shooter, Peter Wilson, British Olympic Association's director of elite performance, Clive Woodward, and British Foreign Secretary, William Hague, amongst others. His funeral was held at Sherborne Abbey in his home town of Sherborne in Dorset.

=== Safety review ===
In the aftermath of the accident, safety concerns were raised over the new AC72 class of yachts which had been chosen to compete in the 2013 America's Cup. This was the second accident involving the class; in October 2012 an Oracle Team USA AC72 also capsized in San Francisco Bay during training, causing substantial damage but no serious injuries. Christopher Clarey, writing in The New York Times, described the class as "high-speed and high-risk." Stephen Park, who heads the British Olympic sailing team, commented: "they're very high powered and the loads on them are huge ... these boats are untrodden waters for sailing. A lot of the loads and a lot of the equipment is new and there are a lot of unknowns and things being tested." Sailing journalist Stuart Alexander, writing in The Independent, stated that the AC72s are seen by some as "death traps." In early June 2013, it was announced that the programme of events for the 2013 America's Cup would be significantly reduced in response to Simpson's death. Later that month, a review committee presented 37 proposed modifications to the event to an international jury which the committee deemed necessary to be fulfilled in order for the event to go ahead altogether.

== Honours ==
Simpson was appointed Member of the Order of the British Empire (MBE) in the 2009 New Year Honours.

== Personal life ==
Born in Windlesham, Surrey in 1976, where he lived and moved to Sherborne. He first learned to sail aged four or five, while visiting his grandparents at Christchurch, Dorset, and later sailed in a Seafly dinghy with his father, Keith. His talent brought him to the notice of Jim Saltonstall, who coached him in the Royal Yachting Association youth squad. Simpson attended Pangbourne College, a mixed boarding school in Berkshire, which originated as a nautical college, coaching students in sailing, seamanship and navigation. He studied at University College London, gaining a degree in economics. In addition to sailing, he was a keen footballer.

Affectionately known as "Bart", after the character Bart Simpson, from the American animated series The Simpsons, Simpson was described as having "steely determination and focus" but being "diplomatic, softly spoken". He is survived by his wife Leah and their two sons, Freddie and Hamish.

== Andrew Simpson Foundation ==
The Andrew Simpson Foundation (ASF) is a registered charity in England and Wales (1153060) and was founded in memory of, and inspired by, Andrew ‘Bart’ Simpson. The ASF was established in 2013 by Trustees Sir Ben Ainslie, Iain Percy OBE and Andrew's wife, Leah. The ASF's mission is to transform lives through sailing. Each year it gives thousands of young people the opportunity to get out on the water and experience the joys and challenges of sailing and watersports. The ASF operates four not-for-profit centres in the UK – Portland, Portsmouth, Reading and Birmingham. The charity also supports sailing initiatives in South Africa and Turks and Caicos.

== Bart's Bash ==
Bart's Bash is a fund-raising event organised by the Andrew Simpson Foundation in memory of Andrew (Bart). Launched in 2014, it is the world's largest sailing event. Its main aims are to increase international awareness of sailing, and to raise funds for supporting sustainable projects and improving the lives of children. The first Bart's Bash inspired over 700 sailing clubs from more than 60 countries to organise individual Bart's Bash races at their locations. In January 2015, Bart's Bash was awarded a Guinness World Record for staging the largest sailing race in 24 hours.
