= Pierre-Alexis Ponsot =

French sailor (born 1975)

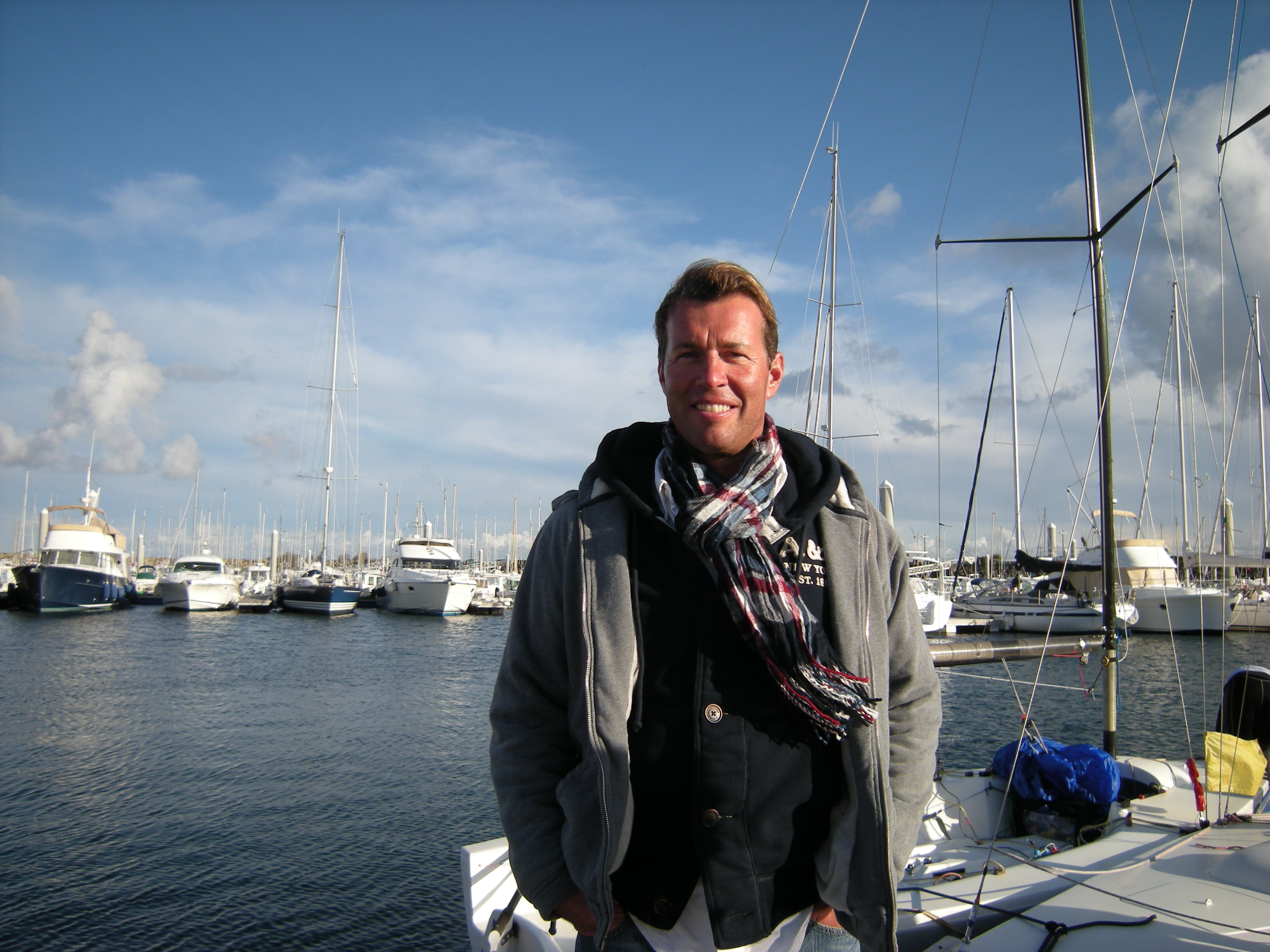

Personal information
- Full name: Pierre-Alexis Ponsot
- Nationality: France
- Born: 8 May 1975 (age 51) Granville, Manche, France
- Height: 1.95 m (6 ft 5 in)
- Weight: 98 kg (216 lb)

Sailing career
- Sport: Sailing
- Club: Sport Nautique de l'Ouest
- Class: Keelboat

Pierre-Alexis Ponsot (born 8 May 1975) is a French sailor, who specialized in two-person keelboat (Star) class. He represented France, along with his partner and six-time Olympian Xavier Rohart at the 2012 Summer Olympics, and has also been training for Ouest Nautical Sports Club (French: Sport Nautique de l'Ouest) throughout most of his sporting career. As of September 2014, Leboucher is ranked forty-first in the world for fleet racing and keelboat by the International Sailing Federation, following his successes at the 2011 ISAF Sailing World Championships and 2012 Star World Championships.

Ponsot qualified as a crew member for the French squad in the Star class at the 2012 Summer Olympics in London by finishing ninth and receiving a berth from the ISAF World Championships in Perth, Western Australia. Teaming with his partner Rohart in the opening series, the French duo delivered a powerful lead in the first leg, but came up short for the podium with an accumulated net score of 86 points and a satisfying ninth position against a fleet of sixteen boats.
