= Michael Hestbæk =

Danish sailor

Michael Hestbæk (born 19 May 1969 in Copenhagen) is a Danish Olympic sailor in the Star and 49er classes. He finished 9th in the 1996 and 2000 Summer Olympics, in the Star and in the 49er classes respectively, in 11th at the 2012 Summer Olympics in the Star category again, and took a bronze medal at the 2012 Star World Championships.
