= Paul McKenzie (sailor) =

Australian sailor

Personal information
- Nationality: Australian
- Born: 2 February 1968 (age 57); Colac, Victoria, Australia

Sport
- Sport: Sailing

Paul McKenzie (born 2 February 1968) is an Australian sailor. He competed in the Finn event at the 1996 Summer Olympics.
