= Siniša Mikuličić =

Croatian sailor (born 1983)

Personal information
- Nationality: Croatia
- Born: 16 October 1983 (age 42) Rijeka, SR Croatia, SFR Yugoslavia
- Height: 1.75 m (5 ft 9 in)
- Weight: 100 kg (220 lb)

Sailing career
- Sport: Sailing
- Club: SC 3 Maj
- Coached by: Marko Misura
- Class: Star

Siniša Mikuličić (born 16 October 1983 in Rijeka) is a Croatian sailor, who specialized in the Star class. He achieved his best results in the Star class, by finishing twelfth at the 2008 Star World Championships in Miami, Florida, along with his partner Marin Lovrović, Jr.

Mikulicic represented Croatia at the 2008 Summer Olympics in Beijing, where he competed as a crew sailor for the Star class. He and his partner Lovrovic finished fifteenth at the end of ten preliminary races, with a net score of 98 points.
