= Robert Stanjek =

German sailor (born 1981)

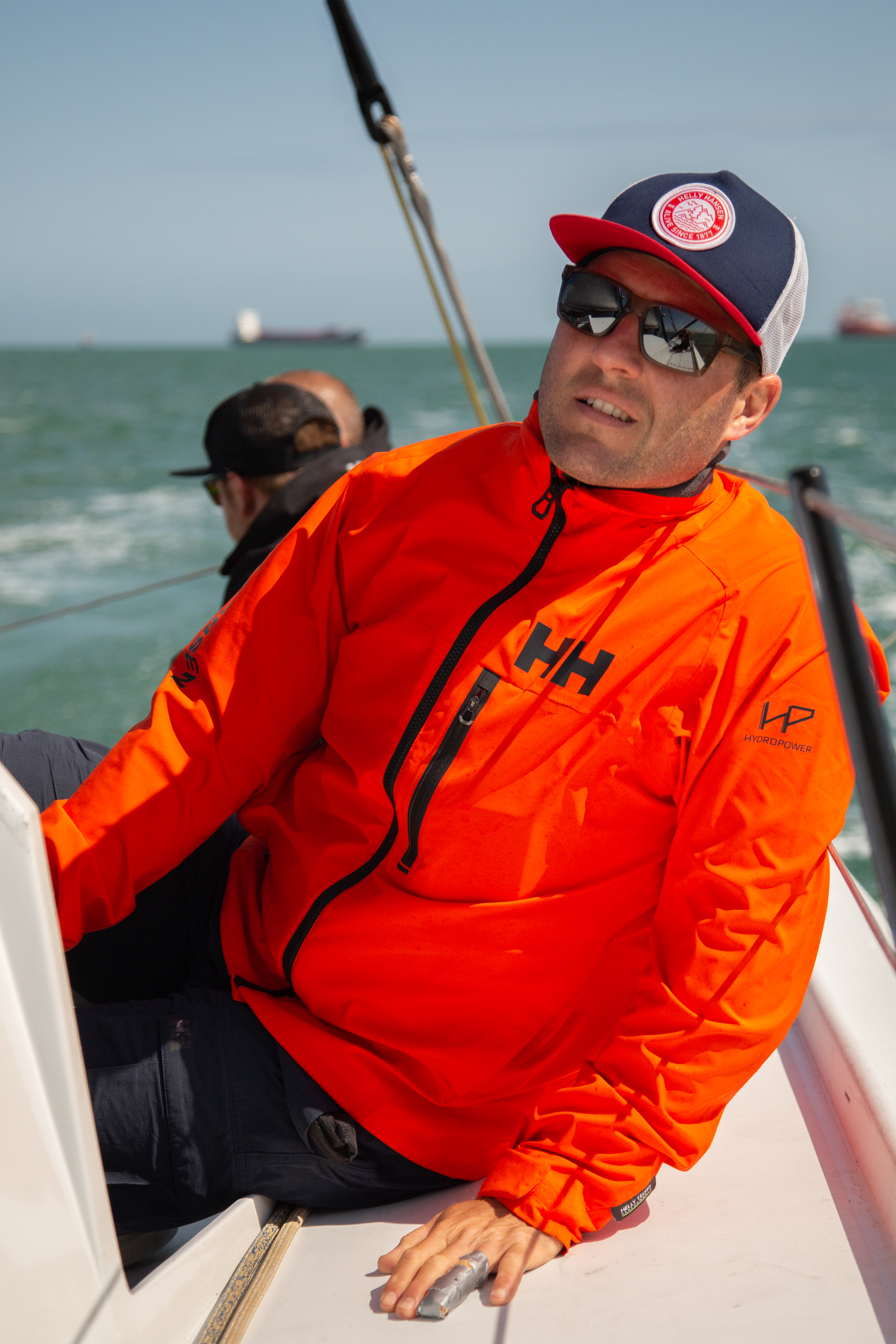

Personal information
- Nationality: Germany
- Born: 7 May 1981 (age 45) Rüdersdorf, Brandenburg, East Germany
- Height: 1.76 m (5 ft 9 in)
- Weight: 86 kg (190 lb)

Sailing career
- Sport: Sailing
- Club: Norddeutscher Regatta Verein
- Coached by: Alan Smith
- Class: Keelboat
Medal record
Men's sailing
Representing Germany
World Championships
Silver medal – second place	2011 Perth	Star

Robert Stanjek (born 7 May 1981 in Rüdersdorf, Brandenburg) is a German sailor, who specialized in two-person keelboat (Star) class. He represented Germany, along with his partner Frithjof Kleen in the Star class at the 2012 Summer Olympics, and also captured a silver medal at the 2011 ISAF Sailing World Championships in Perth, Australia. Stanjek has also been training throughout most of his sporting career for the North German Sailing Regatta (German: Norddeutscher Regatta Verein) in Hamburg under his personal coach Alan Smith. As of November 2014, Stanjek is ranked eighth in the world for the two-person keelboat by the International Sailing Federation, following his first-place effort at the ISAF World Cup Series and Star World Championship in Malcesine, Italy.

Stanjek qualified as a skipper for the German squad in the Star class at the 2012 Summer Olympics in London by placing second and receiving a berth from the ISAF World Championships in Perth, Western Australia. Teaming with his partner Frithjof Kleen in the opening series, the German duo recorded a net score of 70 points throughout the entire race, but came up short for the medal podium in sixth position against a fleet of sixteen boats.
