= Dan Lovrović =

Croatian sailor

Personal information
- Nationality: Croatia
- Born: 7 December 1984 (age 41) Rijeka, SR Croatia, SFR Yugoslavia
- Height: 1.88 m (6 ft 2 in)
- Weight: 95 kg (209 lb)

Sailing career
- Sport: Sailing
- Club: JK Galeb
- Class(es): Star, Finn

Dan Lovrović (born December 7, 1984, in Rijeka) is a Croatian sailor, who specialized in the Star and Finn classes. He achieved his best results in the Star class, by finishing twelfth at the 2012 Star World Championships in Hyères, France, along with his older brother Marin.

Lovrovic represented Croatia at the 2012 Summer Olympics in London, where he competed as a skipper sailor for the Star class. He and his partner Marin finished last out of sixteen pairs at the end of ten preliminary races, with a net score of 116 points.

After 2012 Summer Olympics, Lovrović has switched to Finn sailing class.
