= Afonso Domingos =

Portuguese sailor (born 1969)

Personal information
- Full name: Afonso Manuel Costa Gaspar da Silva Domingos
- Nationality: Portugal
- Born: 29 July 1969 (age 57) Maputo, Mozambique
- Height: 1.74 m (5 ft 9 in)
- Weight: 83 kg (183 lb)

Sailing career
- Sport: Sailing
- Club: Clube Naval de Cascais
- Coached by: Andy Zawija
- Classes: Skiff, multihull, keelboat

Afonso Manuel Costa Gaspar da Silva Domingos (born 29 July 1969 in Maputo, Mozambique) is a Portuguese sailor, who specialized in mixed multihull (Nacra 17) and two-person keelboat (Star) classes. He represented his nation Portugal in three editions of the Olympic Games (2000, 2008, and 2012), and has been training throughout his sailing career for Cascais Naval Club (Portuguese: Clube Naval de Cascais) in his current residence Cascais, under his personal coach Andy Zawija.

Domingos made his Olympic debut at the 2000 Summer Olympics in Sydney, where he and his partner Diogo Cayolla sailed a marvelous stretch to seal a seventh-place finish in the 49er class with a net grade of 93.

Despite missing out a place on the Portuguese team in Athens 2004, Domingos returned from an eight-year absence to compete for his second bid at the 2008 Summer Olympics in Beijing. Sailing with skipper Bernardo Santos in their new boat Star, the Portuguese duo started the race on a blistering third-place effort, but fell short to eighth by a late caution in the middle of the series with a score of 72 net points.

At the 2012 Summer Olympics in London, Domingos teamed up with new partner Frederico Melo on his third Olympic appearance in the Star class, after having secured a berth and placing thirteenth from the ISAF World Championships in Perth, Western Australia. Domingos and Melo failed to improve their feat from the previous Games throughout the ten-race series with a mediocre, fifteenth-place effort, posting a net grade of 108.
