= Fredrik Lööf =

Swedish sailor

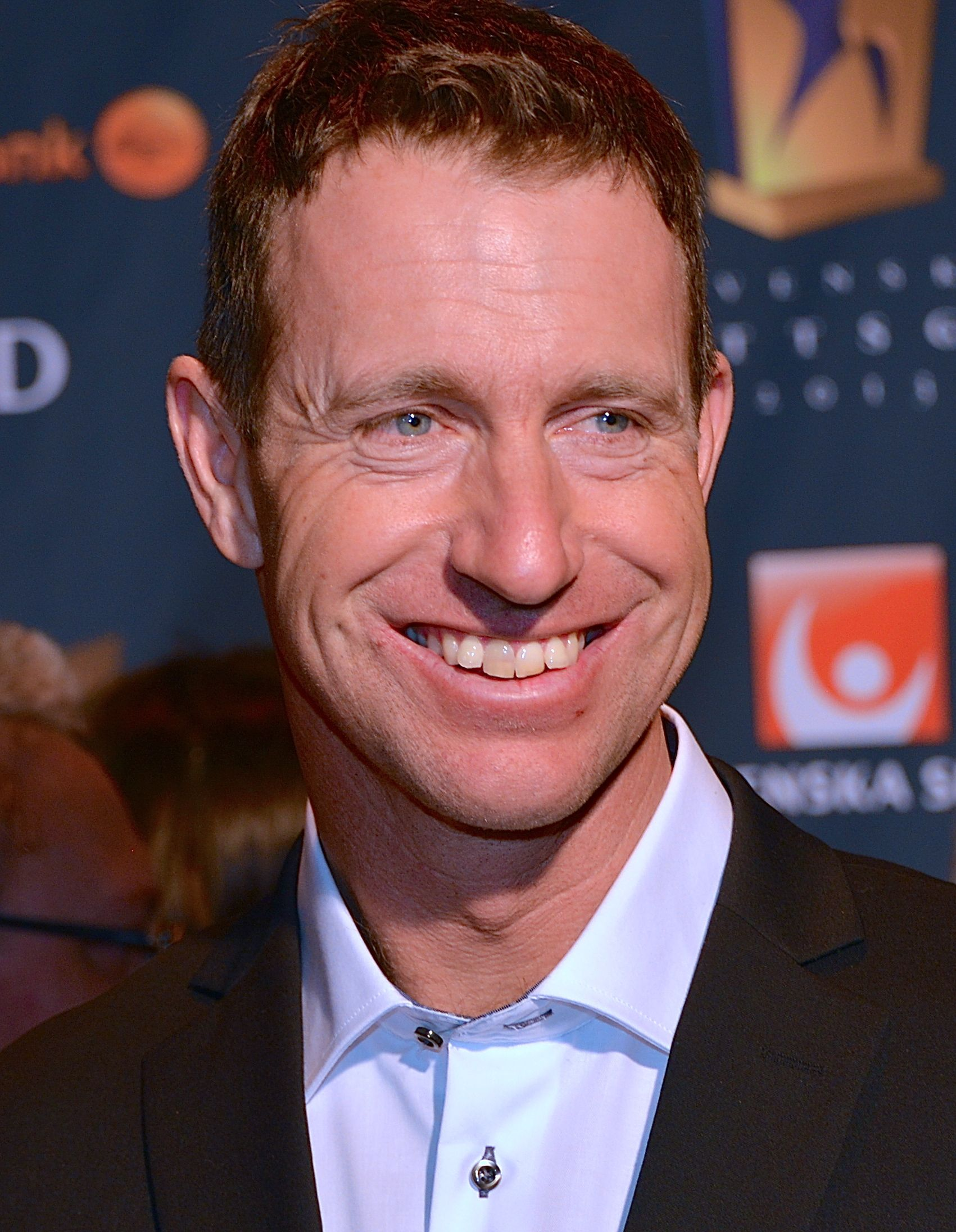
- Fredrik Lööf at the Swedish Sports Awards inside the Stockholm Globe Arena in Stockholm, Sweden in January 2013

Personal information
- Full name: Max Emil Fredrik Lööf
- Nationality: Sweden
- Born: 13 December 1969 (age 56) Kristinehamn, Sweden
- Height: 1.90 m (6 ft 3 in)
- Weight: 87 kg (192 lb)

Sailing career
- Sport: Sailing
- Club: Kristinehamns Kanotseglare, Royal Swedish Yacht Club
- Classes: Finn, Star
Medal record
Sailing
Representing Sweden
Olympic Games
Gold medal – first place	2012 London	Star class
Bronze medal – third place	2000 Sydney	Finn class
Bronze medal – third place	2008 Beijing	Star class
World Championships
Gold medal – first place	1994 Pärnu	Finn class
Gold medal – first place	1997 Gdańsk	Finn class
Gold medal – first place	1999 Melbourne	Finn class
Gold medal – first place	2001 Medemblik	Star class
Gold medal – first place	2004 Gaeta	Star class
Silver medal – second place	1993 Bangor	Finn class
Silver medal – second place	1995 Melbourne	Finn class
Silver medal – second place	1998 Athens	Finn class
Silver medal – second place	2003 Cádiz	Star class
Bronze medal – third place	1996 La Rochelle	Finn class

Max Emil Fredrik Lööf (born 13 December 1969 in Kristinehamn, Sweden) is a Swedish professional sailor who has participated in six Summer Olympics, winning one gold and two bronze medals. He won the gold medal in Star with Max Salminen at the 2012 Summer Olympics and the bronze medals in Finn in the 2000 Summer Olympics and with Anders Ekström in Star in the 2008 Summer Olympics.

== Biography ==
Fredrik Lööf was born in Kristinehamn close to Vänern on 13 December 1969. He started sailing the Optimist and started racing in the Optimist class at age eight and then continued to the Europe and OK classes.

In 1988, Lööf started sailing Finn to qualify for the 1992 Summer Olympics. He finished fifth in Finn in the 1992 Summer Olympics and the 1996 Summer Olympics. In 2000, he won a bronze medal at the 2000 Summer Olympics. In addition he won three Finn Gold Cup and finished on the podium another four times.

After the 2000 Olympics, he moved on to the Star class. In the 2004 Summer Olympics, he finished 12th with Anders Ekström in Star. He continued in the class together with Ekström and won the bronze medal at the 2008 Summer Olympics.

In the 2012 Summer Olympics, Lööf sailed together with Max Salminen in the Star class, the team was created and coached by Italian Michele Marchesini. The team were making good results and on the day of the Medal race, the three medallist boats were decided with the Lööf/Salminen crew as potential bronze medallists. In the decisive race Lööf and Salminen made a good effort, while the other boats helmed by Iain Percy and Robert Scheidt were guarding each other. As winners of the Medal race, the Swedish team moved to the first place in the result list and became Olympic champions in the Star class.

Lööf was among the 2012 Summer Olympics closing ceremony flag bearers, holding the Swedish flag.

Lööf has also won two World Championships in Star, in 2001 and 2004, and finished second once, in 2003. He has won the European Championships in Star three times, and finished on the podium another three times.

In 2001–02, he was a crewmember on yacht AMER SPORTS ONE and in 2005–06 on yacht Pirates of the Caribbean in the Volvo Ocean Race.

== Sailing Results ==
As of 27 September 2015

=== Olympic Games ===
Year	Venue	Pos.	Class
1992	Barcelona, ESP	5th	Finn class
1996	Savannah, Georgia, USA	5th	Finn class
2000	Sydney, AUS	3rd	Finn class
2004	Athens, GRE	12th	Star class
2008	Qingdao, CHN	3rd	Star class
2012	Weymouth and Portland, GBR	1st	Star class

=== World Championships ===
Year	Competition	Venue	Position	Event
1987	OK World Championship	Luleå, Sweden	4th	OK Dinghy
1990	Finn Gold Cup	Porto Carras, Greece	12th	Finn
1991	Finn Gold Cup	Kingston, Canada	4th	Finn
1992	Finn Gold Cup	Cádiz, Spain	18th	Finn
1993	Finn Gold Cup	Bangor, UK	2nd	Finn
1994	Finn Gold Cup	Tallinn, Estonia	1st	Finn
1995	Finn Gold Cup	Melbourne, Australia	2nd	Finn
1996	Finn Gold Cup	La Rochelle, France	3rd	Finn
1997	6 Metre World Cup	Cannes, France	10th	6 Metre
1997	Finn Gold Cup	Gdańsk, Poland	1st	Finn
1998	Finn Gold Cup	Athens, Greece	2nd	Finn
1999	Finn Gold Cup	Melbourne, Australia	1st	Finn
2000	Finn Gold Cup	Weymouth, UK	8th	Finn
2001	Star World Championship	Medemblik, Netherlands	1st	Star
2002	Star World Championship	Marina del Rey, USA	14th	Star
2003	ISAF Sailing World Championships	Cádiz, Spain	2nd	Star
2004	Star World Championship	Gaeta, Italy	1st	Star
2005	Star World Championship	Buenos Aires, Argentina	4th	Star
2005	Etchells World Championship	San Francisco, USA	18th	Etchells
2006	Star World Championship	San Francisco, USA	5th	Star
2007	Melges 24 World Championship	Santa Cruz, USA	17th	Melges 24
2007	ISAF Sailing World Championships	Cascais, Portugal	8th	Star
2008	Star World Championship	Miami, USA	11th	Star
2009	Star World Championship	Varberg, Sweden	6th	Star
2009	Melges 32 World Championship	Porto Cervo, Italy	10th	Melges 32
2010	Star World Championship	Rio de Janeiro, Brazil	7th	Star
2011	ISAF Sailing World Championships	Perth, Australia	5th	Star
2012	Star World Championship	Hyères, France	5th	Star
