= Tibor Tenke =

Hungarian sailor

Personal information
- Nationality: Hungarian
- Born: 13 January 1953 (age 72); Budapest, Hungary

Sport
- Sport: Sailing

Tibor Tenke (born 13 January 1953) is a Hungarian sailor. He competed in the Star event at the 1992 Summer Olympics.
