= Frederico Melo =

Portuguese sailor (born 1987)

Personal information
- Full name: Frederico Ricciardi Pinheiro de Melo
- Nationality: Portugal
- Born: 13 July 1987 (age 38) Azusa, California, United States
- Height: 1.88 m (6 ft 2 in)
- Weight: 72 kg (159 lb)

Sailing career
- Sport: Sailing
- Club: Clube Naval de Cascais
- Coached by: Andy Zawieja
- Class(es): Dinghy, keelboat

Frederico Ricciardi Pinheiro de Melo (born 13 July 1987 in Azusa, California, United States) is a Portuguese sailor, who specializes in heavyweight one-person dinghy (Finn) and two-person keelboat (Star) classes. He represented his nation Portugal, along with his partner and three-time Olympian Afonso Domingos, at the 2012 Summer Olympics, and has trained throughout his sailing career with Cascais Naval Club (Portuguese: Clube Naval de Cascais) in his current residence Cascais, under his personal coach Andy Zawieja. Born and raised in the United States, Melo also held a dual citizenship to compete internationally for his parents' homeland in sailing. As of June 2015, Melo was ranked twentieth in the world for the heavyweight one-person dinghy class by the International Sailing Federation.

Melo qualified for the Portuguese sailing team in the Star class at the 2012 Summer Olympics in London, securing a berth by placing thirteenth at the 2011 ISAF World Championships in Perth, Western Australia. He and his skipper Domingos struggled to mount a challenge against a field of fifteen other boats throughout the ten-race series, ending them in the penultimate position out of sixteen with a net grade of 108.

In 2017-18 he was a crewmember on the boat Turn the Tide on Plastic in the Volvo Ocean Race.
