= David Burrows (sailor) =

Irish sailor

David Burrows (born 1977) is an Irish sailor. He competed at the 1996, 2000, 2004 and 2012 Summer Olympics. His best Olympic result is a 9th place in the Finn class in Sydney in 2000.

David is from Portmarnock and educated in St Michael's and UCD
