= Robert Scheidt =

Brazilian sailor

Robert Scheidt OLY
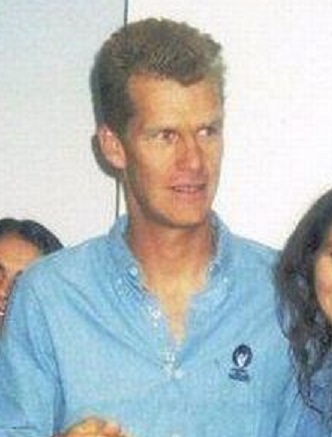
- Scheidt in 2004

Personal information
- Nationality: Brazil
- Born: 15 April 1973 (age 53) São Paulo, São Paulo

Sailing career
- Sport: Sailing
- Club: Yacht Club Santo Amaro; Circolo Vela Torbole
- Classes: Laser, Star
Medal record
Sailing
Representing Brazil
Olympic Games
Gold medal – first place	1996 Atlanta	Laser
Gold medal – first place	2004 Athens	Laser
Silver medal – second place	2000 Sydney	Laser
Silver medal – second place	2008 Beijing	Star
Bronze medal – third place	2012 London	Star
World Championships
Gold medal – first place	1995 Tenerife	Laser
Gold medal – first place	1996 Simon's Town	Laser
Gold medal – first place	1997 Algarrobo	Laser
Gold medal – first place	2000 Cancún	Laser
Gold medal – first place	2001 Cork	Laser
Gold medal – first place	2002 Hyannis	Laser
Gold medal – first place	2004 Bitez	Laser
Gold medal – first place	2005 Fortaleza	Laser
Gold medal – first place	2007 Cascais	Star
Gold medal – first place	2011 Perth	Star
Gold medal – first place	2012 Hyères	Star
Gold medal – first place	2013 Al Musannah	Laser
Silver medal – second place	1999 Melbourne	Laser
Silver medal – second place	2003 Cádiz	Laser
Silver medal – second place	2006 San Francisco	Star
Bronze medal – third place	1993 Takapuna	Laser
Bronze medal – third place	2008 Miami	Star
Pan American Games
Gold medal – first place	1995 Mar del Plata	Men's Laser
Gold medal – first place	1999 Winnipeg	Men's Laser
Gold medal – first place	2003 Santo Domingo	Men's Laser
Silver medal – second place	2007 Rio	Men's Laser
Silver medal – second place	2015 Toronto	Men's Laser

Robert Scheidt (born 15 April 1973) is a Brazilian sailor who has won two gold medals, two silver medals and a bronze from five Olympic Games and a Star Sailors League Final. He is one of the most successful sailors at Olympic Games and one of the most successful Brazilian Olympic athletes, being one of only two to earn five medals along with fellow sailor Torben Grael, and only behind the six medals of Rebeca Andrade. He is the only Brazilian sailor to win medals in both dinghy and keelboat classes. He is widely considered to be one of the greatest sailors of all time.

== Early career ==
Scheidt was born in São Paulo to Fritz Scheidt and Karin Kreuger Scheidt. His father gave him his first boat when he was nine, and Robert began practising in the Guarapiranga dam. With the help of Dudu Melchert, his coach, he began winning several competitions.

At the age of 11, Scheidt became the South American Champion in the Optimist class, in Algarrobo, Chile, in 1985 and again in 1986. Because of his wins, he was chosen to represent Brazil in the Optimist World Championship in 1986. This was the turning point of his career and made him decide to quit tennis and focus on sailing.

Because his weight and height exceeded the Optimist recommendations, he began sailing in the Snipe class, and was second at the 1989 Brazilian Snipe Junior Championship, and champion in 1990, 1991 and 1992.

In 1990, he also began sailing Lasers and became Brazilian junior champion and was called to represent Brazil in the ISAF Youth Sailing World Championships, held in Netherlands were he finished 5th. Following this championship, he trained in Denmark and Sweden and participated for the first time in the Kiel Week. He again represent Brazil 1991 ISAF Youth Sailing World Championship in Scotland he sailed a good and consistent regatta, won 10 out of the 11 races, and won his first World Championship title.

== Senior career ==
In 1995, he won the gold medal in the Pan American Games in Mar del Plata, and his first World Championship. The following year, he graduated from the Mackenzie Presbyterian University in Business Administration. In this year, 1996, his greatest achievement: after a thrilling and controversial duel with Ben Ainslie (19, UK), he took the Olympic gold medal in Atlanta, in the Laser class. He also won in 1996 the World Championship, held in Cape Town, South Africa and again in 1997, in Algarrobo, Chile.

In 1999, he won the gold medal in the Pan American Games, in Winnipeg, Canada on Lake Winnipeg, ahead of Mark Mendelblatt of the U.S. and Diego Romero of Argentina. In 2000, after his fourth World Title, in Cancún, Mexico, there were high expectations that he would win gold in the Olympic Games, in Sydney. But along with the rest of the Brazilian delegation, he failed to win the medal and, after an amazing and controversial battle with Ben Ainslie, from Great Britain, he took home the silver medal. His fifth world title came in 2001, in Cork, Ireland and his sixth in 2002, in Cape Cod, United States.

In 2003, he became for the third time Pan American Games Champion, with gold in Santo Domingo, Dominican Republic. In 2004, he won the gold medal in the Laser class in Athens, Ainslie having moved up a weight division to the Finn class, and won his 6th World Title in Bitez, Turkey, ahead of Mark Mendelblatt.

In March 2005, he was ranked 1st in the world in the Laser, ahead of Paul Goodison of Great Britain, Michael Blackburn of Australia, and Mark Mendelblatt of the U.S. His last World Title came in 2005, when he was proclaimed champion in his birth country for the first time, in Fortaleza, Brazil.

After this win, he decided to leave the Laser class and focus on two-person racing keelboat Star Class, along with Bruno Prada. In June 2006, he and Prada won the silver medal at the 2006 Kiel Week in Germany, behind Mark Mendelblatt and crewman Mark Strube. In August 2006, he and Prada won a silver medal at the Star European Championship against 93 boats in Neustadt, Germany, again behind Mendelblatt and Strube.

He won nine titles since 2003, including the World Title in 2007, in Portugal and a silver medal at the 2008 Olympic Games in Beijing. With this podium, he also became the first Brazilian athlete to win a medal in four consecutive Olympic Games. His four medals put him, along with swimmer Gustavo Borges, behind only sailor Torben Grael as the Brazilian with the most Olympic medals. He was appointed as the Brazilian flag bearer at the Beijing Olympic Games.

In the 2012 Summer Olympics in London, Scheidt won his fifth Olympic medal, a bronze at the Star. He tied Grael's record and also became the first Brazilian to win medals in five consecutive Olympics, though he wished to win the gold given that would be the last Olympics for the Star Class. To ensure another participation in the 2016 Summer Olympics hosted by Brazil in Rio de Janeiro, Scheidt returned to the Laser in 2013, right away winning the World Championship at the age of 40. In his sixth Olympics, for the first time Scheidt missed the Olympic podium, finishing fourth in spite of winning the medal race. He remained competing in the next Olympic cycle and managed to qualify for the 2020 Olympic Games, becoming the first Brazilian to appear in seven Olympics. Despite reaching the medal race, Scheidt only finished eighth. He has declared that while he will continue sailing, it will not be in the Laser due to the boat's required physicality .

== Personal life ==
On 25 October 2008, he married Lithuanian sailor and Olympic silver medalist Gintarė Volungevičiūtė in the Town Hall of Kaunas, Lithuania. They have two sons and reside at Lago di Garda, Italy. Erik Scheidt who is his son won the male title at the 2026 Youth ILCA 6 World Championships

== Career ==
=== Olympic Games ===
- Laser (ILCA) Class
  - Gold in Atlanta, 1996
  - Silver in Sydney, 2000
  - Gold in Athens, 2004
  - 4th in Rio, 2016
  - 8th in Tokyo, 2020
- Star Class
  - Silver in Beijing, 2008
  - Bronze in London, 2012

=== World Championships titles ===
- Star World Championship
  - 1st 2007 part of 2007 ISAF Sailing World Championships (Cascais, Portugal)
  - 1st 2011 part of 2011 ISAF Sailing World Championships (Perth, Australia)
  - 1st 2012 (Hyères, France)
- ILCA 7 World Championship
  - 1st 1995 Tenerife, Spain
  - 1st 1996 Cape Town, South Africa
  - 1st 1997 Algarrobo, Chile
  - 1st 2000 Cancún, Mexico
  - 1st 2001 Cork, Ireland
  - 1st 2002 Cape Cod, USA
  - 1st 2004 Bitez, Turkey
  - 1st 2005 Fortaleza, Brazil
  - 1st 2013 Muscat, Oman,
- Youth Sailing World Championships - ILCA 7
  - 1st 1991 GBR

=== Other World Championship Results ===
- Youth Sailing World Championships - ILCA 7
  - 5th 1990
- Star World Championship
  - 9th 2010
  - 11th 2009
  - 3th 2008
  - 2th 2006
  - 6th 2005
- ILCA 7 World Championship
  - 42nd 2020
  - 12th 2019
  - 10th 2016
  - 15th 2015
  - 5th 2014 part of 2014 ISAF Sailing World Championships
  - 2nd 2003 part of 2003 ISAF Sailing World Championships
  - 2nd 2000
  - 6th 1998 part of 1998 ISAF World Sailing Games
  - 6th 1994
  - 3rd 1993
- Male 49er World Championship
  - 40th 2017
- Optimist World Championship
  - ???? 1986

== Continental Titles ==
- Optimist class:
  - South American Championship (youth):
    - 1985, 1986
- Laser class
  - South American Championships:
    - 1992, 1993, 1994, 1997, 2001, 2004
- Star Class:
  - South American Championship:
    - 2006

== Brazilian National Titles ==
- ILCA/Laser
  - 1987 (junior), 1991 (junior)
  - 1992, 1994, 1995, 1998, 1999, 2000, 2001, 2002, 2003, 2004, 2005
- Star
  - 2006

== Other Titles ==
- Star Class:
  - Star Sailors League Finals
    - 2013 (Nassau, Bahamas)
  - Pre-Olympic:
    - 2006
- Laser class
  - World ISAF Games:
    - Marseille, France, 1997
  - Pan American Games:
    - Mar del Plata, Argentina, 1995
    - Winnipeg, Canada, 1999
    - Santo Domingo, Dominican Republic, 2003
  - Europe Cup:
    - 1993, 1998, 2000, 2001, 2002, 2005
  - Kiel Week:
    - 1999, 2000, 2004
  - Spa Regatta:
    - 1998, 2002

Awards
Preceded by Gustavo Kuerten	Brazilian Sportsmen of the Year; 2001	Succeeded by Nalbert Bitencourt
Olympic Games
Preceded by Isabel Clark Ribeiro	Flagbearer for Brazil; 2008 Beijing	Succeeded by Isabel Clark Ribeiro
