= Mark Mendelblatt =

American yachtsman

Personal information
- Nationality: American
- Born: February 19, 1973 (age 53) St. Petersburg, Florida, U.S.
- Height: 6 ft 1 in (185 cm)
- Weight: 179 lb (81 kg)

Sailing career
- Sport: Sailing
- College team: Tufts University
- Club: St. Petersburg Yacht Club
- Classes: ILCA 7, Nacra 17, Laser II, Star, A-Catamaran, Melges 20, 49er, Etchells, Melges 24, TP52, Soling, Vanguard 15

Achievements and titles
- World finals: 1985 International Optimist World Championships; Third place; 1991 Laser II World Championships; gold medal; 1998 ISAF Team Racing World Championships; 2004 Laser World Championships; Silver medal
- Regional finals: 1989 Laser II North American Championships; Gold medal; 1999 Pan American Games; Silver medal
- National finals: 1984 International Optimist Dinghy National Sailing Championships; Gold medal; 1985 Optimist Pram National Championship; Second place; Collegiate All-American (1992–94); 1995 Laser National Championships; Gold medal
Medal record
Sailing
Representing United States
Pan American Games
Silver medal – second place	1999 Winnipeg	Men's Laser

Mark Mendelblatt (born February 19, 1973) is an American yachtsman. Married to windsurfer Carolina Mendelblatt (née Borges), he primarily sails the Laser Radial, a one-design class of small (13 ft 0 in or 3.96 m long, and 130 lb or 59 kg) single-handed sailing dinghy. Beginning in 2005, he also started to race in the two-person keelboat Star class.

At age 11, he won the International Optimist Dinghy National Sailing Championships, and at age 18, he won the Laser II World Championships. A three-time college All-American at Tufts University, he won a silver medal in the Laser at the 1999 Pan American Games. In 2004, he won a silver medal at the Laser World Championships.

== Early and personal life ==
Mendelblatt, who is Jewish, was born in St. Petersburg, Florida. His father, Frank, and his brother, David (also a sailor), are ophthalmologists. His mother, Kathy, supervises their practice.

He attended St. Petersburg High School, helping its sailing team win four consecutive national titles, and graduated in 1991. He resides in St. Petersburg, and is a securities broker.

== Sailing career ==
=== Summary - Olympics ===
- 7th - Star Men - London 2012 Olympic Sailing Competition
- 8th - ILCA 7 Men - 2004 Athens Olympic Games Sailing Competition

=== Summary - World Championships ===
- 1st 1991 Laser II World Championship
- 1st 1998 ISAF Team Racing World Championship
- 2nd 2004 Laser World Championship (Olympic Qualifier)
- 2nd 2009 TP52 World Championship
- 3rd Perth 2011 ISAF Sailing World Championships - Star
- 4th 1999 J/22 World Championships
- Etchells World Championship
- Melges 20 World Championship
- Melges 24 World Championship
- Nacra 17 World Championship
- A-Class Catamaran World Championship
- Star World Championship

=== Early years ===
Mendelblatt began taking classes at the St. Petersburg Sailing Center at age 6, and started sailing competitively at age 10. In 1984, at age 11, he was the overall winner at the International Optimist Dinghy National Sailing Championships in Maryland, and also won the North American title. In 1985, he was part of a five-person U.S. Optimist Dinghy team, along with his brother David, that took third place in the 25th International Optimist World Championships in team racing in Finland. It was the best U.S. finish ever in dinghy racing. He also came in second in the Optimist Pram National Championship, behind his brother David.

In 1989, at the age of 16, he teamed with his 19-year-old brother David to outrace 21 other entries and win the Laser II North American Championships in Maryland. In 1991, at the age of 18, he won the Laser II World Championships in England, competing against more than 180 adult competitors.

=== 1991–95; College ===
In college, he was a three-time All-American in sailing (1992–94), and was named winner of the Clarence "Pop" Houston Award as Tufts University Athlete of the Year in both 1993 and 1994. In 1993, he won the collegiate National Single-Handed Championship in Seattle, the New England Singlehanded Championship, and the New England Sloop Championship. In 1995 he won the Laser National Championships. He graduated Tufts in 1995, with a degree in psychology.

=== 1999–2004; Pan Am Games, World Championships, and Olympics ===
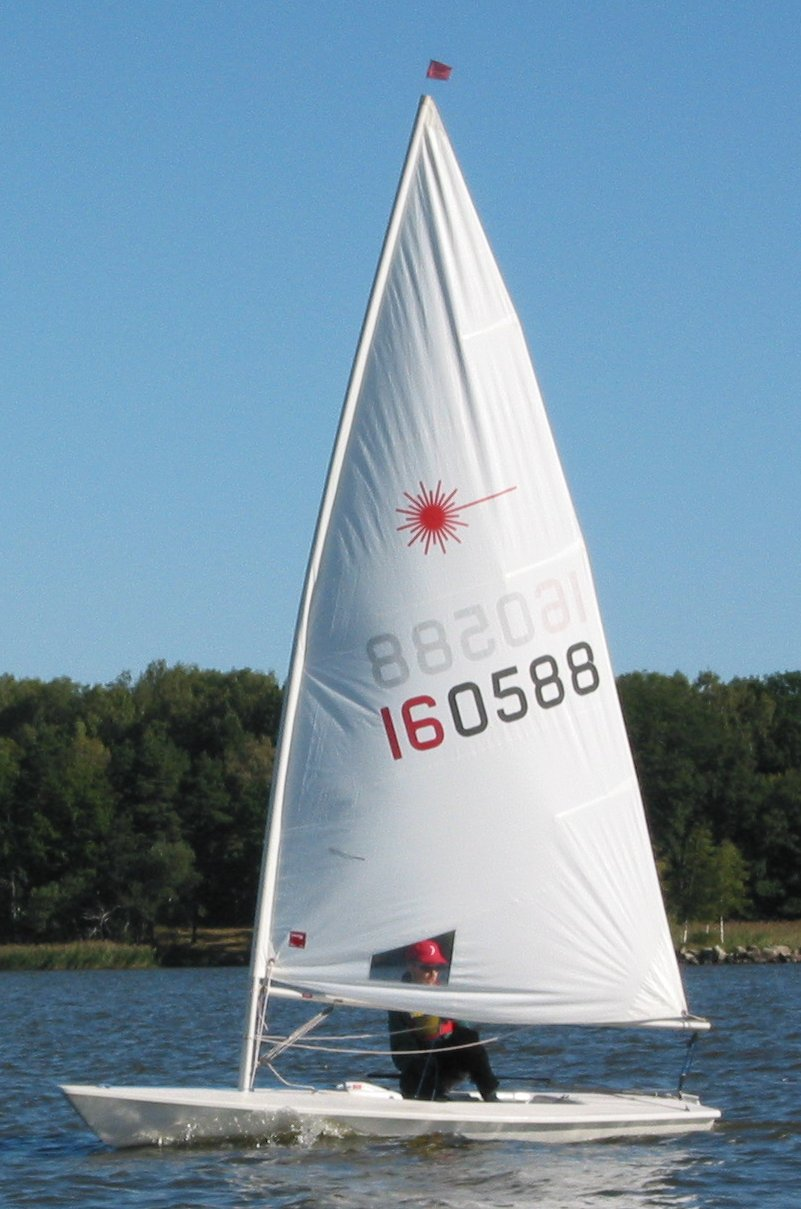
A Laser

Mendelblatt earned a silver medal in the Laser at the 1999 Pan American Games on Lake Winnipeg, behind Brazil's Robert Scheidt and ahead of Diego Romero of Argentina. That year he also won the Laser North American title, and the US Olympic Sailing Committee recognized him as Athlete of the Year.

In 2000, he came in 2nd out of 32 boats at the Laser Olympic Team Trials. The next year he won the 2001 Laser North American Championships. From 2000 to 2003, he was the "traveler" (working the control that moves the boom) aboard OneWorld Challenge, an America's Cup yacht that competed in the 2003 Louis Vuitton Cup.

He won the 2003 Rolex Miami Olympic Class Regatta, the Laser Pacific Coast Championships in Oregon on the Columbia River (coming in first out of 33 boats), and the Laser Gulf Coast Championships in Texas (coming in first out of 56 boats), and was named US Sailing's 2003 United States Olympic Committee Male Athlete of the Year. In 2003, Mendelblatt finished 6th in the Laser World Championships in Spain, out of 171 boats. For the year, he was ranked # 1 among US Laser sailors. Tim Landt, president of the International Laser Class Association, said Mendelblatt was "the total package", opining that: "He's got the perfect structure (6 feet 2, 180 pounds). He's got extremely muscular legs, and he's very lean and very tenacious, like Lance Armstrong."

In 2004, he was fourth out of 96 boats at the Laser European Championship, sixth out of 58 Lasers at the Princess Sofia competition in Spain, and twelfth out of 159 Lasers at Hyeres Week in France. In May 2004, he won a silver medal at the Laser World Championships in Turkey, coming in 2nd out of 145 boats, behind Brazil's Scheidt.

He competed in the 2004 Olympics in Laser (Mixed One-Person Dinghy) in Athens, and placed eighth. US Sailing named him Athlete of the Year for the second time.

=== 2005–present ===
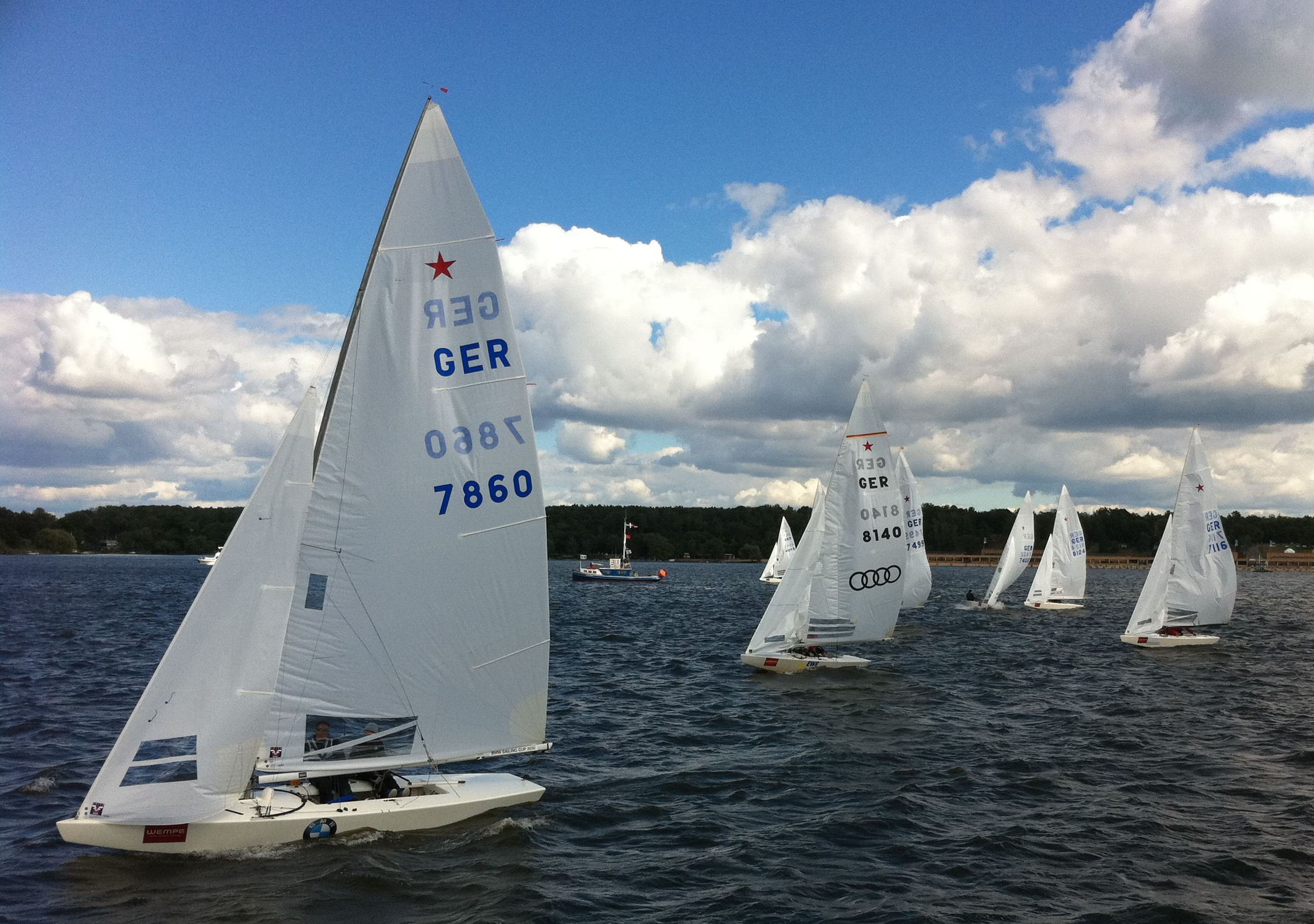
A Starboat regatta

In March 2005, he was ranked 4th in the world in the Laser, behind Scheidt, Paul Goodison of Great Britain, and Michael Blackburn of Australia. That month, he also won the two-person racing keelboat Star class 78th Bacardi Cup on Biscayne Bay, with Mark Strube as crew. In June 2006, Mendelblatt and Strube won the 2006 Kiel Week in Germany, beating Scheidt and crewman Bruno Prada. In August 2006, he and Strube won the Star European Championship over 93 boats in Neustadt, Germany, again defeating second-place finishers Scheidt and Prada. Mendelblatt accepted a position in the fall of 2006 with Emirates Team New Zealand, and in April 2007 replaced injured veteran Adam Beashel.

Mendelblatt and Strube won Kiel Week again in both 2008 and 2009. In 2010, Mendelblatt won the Miami Rolex OCR. In June 2011, he and Brian Fatih won the Star class medal race at the Skandia Sail for Gold Regatta in Dorset, England. Mendelblatt and Fatih competed together at the 2012 Summer Olympics.

== See also ==
- List of select Jews in sailing
