= Aimilios Papathanasiou =

Greek sailor

Personal information
- Nationality: Greek
- Born: 8 May 1973 (age 51); Athens, Greece
- Height: 190 cm (6 ft 3 in)
- Weight: 95 kg (209 lb)

Sailing career
- Class(es): Finn, ILCA 7

Aimilios Papathanasiou (Greek: Αιμίλιος Παπαθανασίου, born 8 May 1973) is a Greek sailor. He competed in the Finn class at the 1996, 2000, 2004, 2008 and 2012 Summer Olympics. His best Olympic result is fifth place in Athens in 2004.
