= Iain Percy =

British sailor

Iain Percy OBE
Personal information
- Full name: Iain Bryden Percy
- Born: 21 March 1976 (age 50) Southampton, United Kingdom

Sport
- Country: Great Britain
- Sport: Men's sailing
- Club: Hayling Island Sailing Club
Medal record
Olympic Games
| Gold medal – first place | 2000 Sydney | Finn class |
| Gold medal – first place | 2008 Beijing | Star class |
| Silver medal – second place | 2012 London | Star class |
World Championships
| Gold medal – first place | 2018 Chicago | Farr 40 class |
| Gold medal – first place | 2010 Rio de Janeiro | Star class |
| Gold medal – first place | 2002 Los Angeles | Star class |
| Silver medal – second place | 2012 Hyères | Star class |
| Bronze medal – third place | 2007 Cascais | Star class |
| Bronze medal – third place | 2005 Buenos Aires | Star class |
| Bronze medal – third place | 2004 Gaeta | Star class |
| Bronze medal – third place | 2003 Cádiz | Star class |
European Championships
| Gold medal – first place | 2005 | Star class |
| Gold medal – first place | 2009 Kiel | Star class |

Iain Bryden Percy OBE (born 21 March 1976) is an English sailor and double Olympic champion for Great Britain.

== Olympics ==
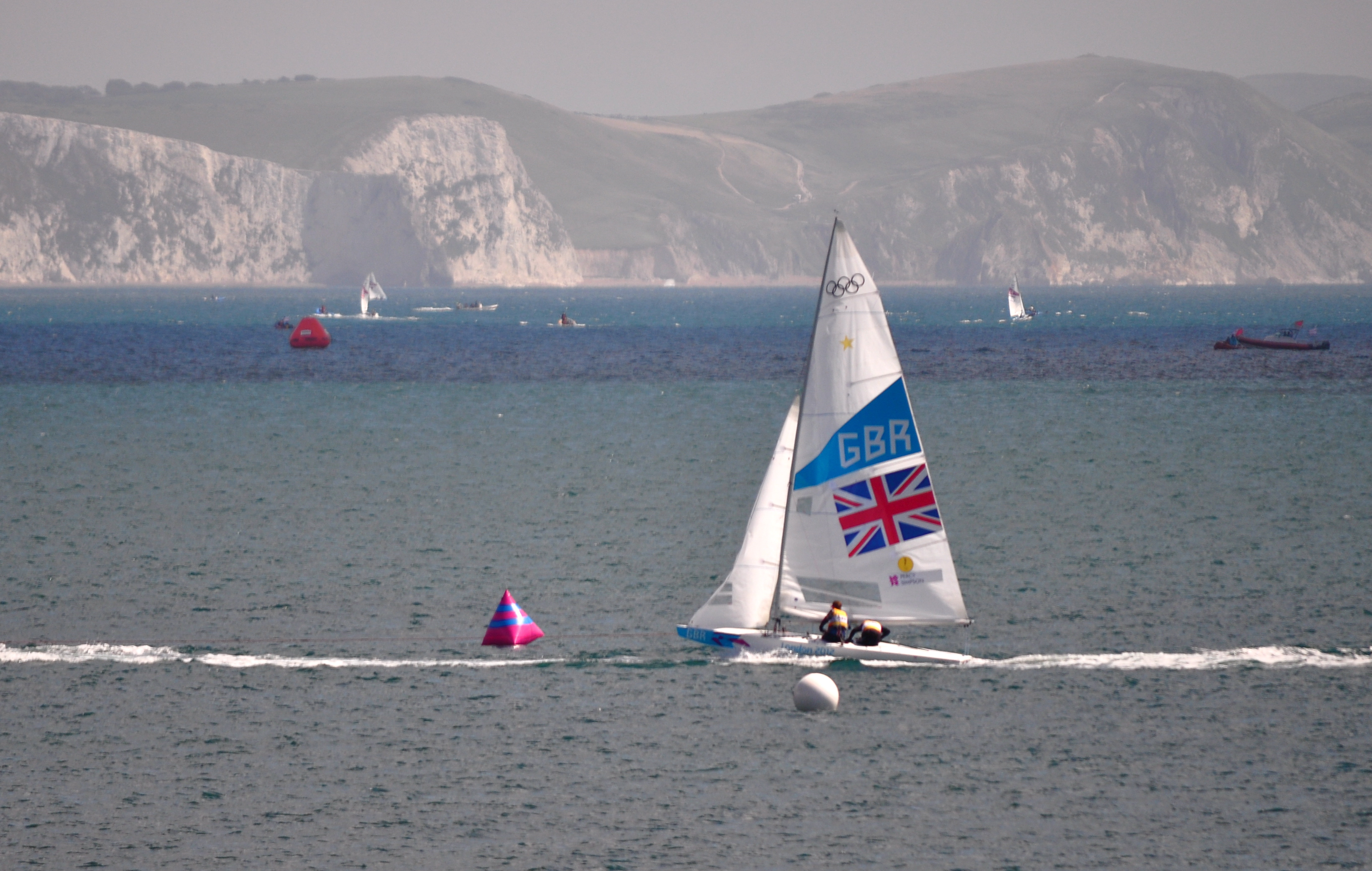
Percy and Andrew Simpson competing in the 2012 Summer Olympics.

Percy competed in the 2000 Summer Olympics in Sydney, where he won a gold medal in the Finn class. He memorably received his gold medal at a ceremony on the steps of the Sydney Opera House.

He competed in the 2004 Summer Olympics in Athens and finished 6th in the double-handed Star class with Steve Mitchell. The same team received a bronze medal at the 2005 World Championships and a gold medal at the 2005 European Championships.

Percy won World Bronze in the Star class with Andrew Simpson in 2007 and European Championship Gold in 2009. The duo won Gold in the same class of boat at the 2010 World Championships which took place in Brazil. With previous partner, Steve Mitchell, Percy won the 2002 Star World Championship in Los Angeles, and medalled in the next three world championships, winning the bronze medal in each of them.

At the 2008 Olympics in Beijing he again won a gold medal, this time in the Star class, teaming up with Andrew Simpson.

At the 2012 Olympics in London he and Andrew Simpson won the silver medal, after a tight race against Swedish duo Fredrik Lööf and Max Salminen.

Percy is a member of Hayling Island Sailing Club and sails there regularly.

== America's Cup ==
In 2005, Percy decided to take a break from full-time Olympic Class sailing and join America's Cup challenger +39 Challenge as helmsman. Due to limited funding, +39 only managed ninth place in the Louis Vuitton Cup. Iain then joined Great Britain's TEAMORIGIN competing in the Louis Vuitton Trophy regattas (Nice, Auckland, La Maddalena) and on the TP52 circuit, prior to stepping onboard Artemis Racing for the Louis Vuitton Trophy – Dubai.

Percy has been with Artemis Racing since then and was Sailing Team Director for the Challenger of Record for the 35th America's Cup. Since 2017 he has been CEO of Artemis Technologies.

== Awards ==
Percy was appointed Member of the Order of the British Empire (MBE) in 2005, as a recognition of his Olympic gold medal, and promoted to Officer of the Order of the British Empire (OBE) in the 2009 New Year Honours. He was awarded an honorary MSc by the University of Chichester in 2000, and a Doctor of Laws honorary degree by the University of Bristol in 2009.

Percy was appointed as Honorary Captain, Royal Naval Reserve, on 1 October 2025.
