= Bruno Prada =

Brazilian sailor

Medal record

Sailing

Representing Brazil

Olympic Games
Silver medal – second place	2008 Beijing	Star
Bronze medal – third place	2012 London	Star

Pan American Games
Bronze medal – third place	1999 Winnipeg	Men's Finn

World Championships
Gold medal – first place	2007 Cascais	Star class
Gold medal – first place	2011 Perth	Star class
Gold medal – first place	2012 Hyères	Star class
Gold medal – first place	2016 Miami	Star class
Gold medal – first place	2019 Porto Cervo	Star class
Silver medal – second place	2006 San Francisco	Star class
Silver medal – second place	2025 Split	Star class
Bronze medal – third place	2008 Miami	Star class
Bronze medal – third place	2014 Malcesine	Star class

Bacardi Cup
Gold medal – first place	2020 Miami	Star
Gold medal – first place	2021 Miami	Star
Gold medal – first place	2022 Miami	Star
Gold medal – first place	2023 Miami	Star
Gold medal – first place	2024 Miami	Star
Gold medal – first place	2025 Miami	Star
Silver medal – second place	2009 Miami	Star
Silver medal – second place	2015 Miami	Star
Bronze medal – third place	2016 Miami	Star
Bronze medal – third place	2026 Miami	Star

Star Sailors League
Gold medal – first place	2013 Nassau	Star
Silver medal – second place	2015 Nassau	Star

World Cup
Gold medal – first place	2011	Star
Bronze medal – third place	2012	Star

European Championship
Gold medal – first place	2009 Kiel	Star
Gold medal – first place	2018 Flensburg	Star
Silver medal – second place	2006 Neustadt	Star
Silver medal – second place	2015 Gaeta	Star
Silver medal – second place	2016 Warnemünde	Star
Bronze medal – third place	2017 Sanremo	Star

North American Championship
Gold medal – first place	2017 Marblehead	Star
Silver medal – second place	2006 Miami	Star
Silver medal – second place	2016 Chicago	Star
Silver medal – second place	2022 Annapolis	Star
Bronze medal – third place	2021 Newport Beach	Star

Eastern Hemisphere Championship
Gold medal – first place	2007 Palma	Star
Gold medal – first place	2008 Split	Star
Silver medal – second place	2009 Hyères	Star
Silver medal – second place	2018 Trieste	Star

Western Hemisphere Championship
Gold medal – first place	2023 Cleveland	Star
Silver medal – second place	2010 Nassau	Star
Silver medal – second place	2014 Sunapee	Star
Bronze medal – third place	2021 Miami	Star
Bronze medal – third place	2024 Miami	Star

South American Championship
Gold medal – first place	2006 Rio de Janeiro	Star
Silver medal – second place	2014 Ilhabela	Star
Silver medal – second place	2005 Buenos Aires	Star
Bronze medal – third place	2003 Rio de Janeiro	Star

Bruno Prada (born 31 July 1971 in São Paulo) is a Brazilian sailor.

After sailing Optimists until the age of 14, he moved to the Laser class, where he was Brazilian and South American Junior champion and 7th at Youth Worlds in 1989, and the Snipe class, where he achieved a second place at the Brazilian Junior Nationals, and was 11th at the Junior Worlds in 1988.

In 1989, he changed to the Finn class, becoming Brazilian national champion in 1993, 1997 and 1998, and winning a bronze medal at the 1999 Pan American Games.

He won a silver medal in the Star class with Robert Scheidt at the 2008 Summer Olympics and a bronze in the same category with the same partner at the 2012 Summer Olympics.

He won the Star World Championship five times, in 2007, 2011 and 2012 with Robert Scheidt, and in 2016 with Augie Diaz, and in 2019 in Porto Cervo with Mateusz Kusznierewicz and was second in 2006 and third in 2008 and 2014.
