= Dominik Życki =

Polish sailor

Dominik Życki (born 15 February 1974) is a Polish sailor. He was born in Warsaw. He competed at the 2008 Summer Olympics in Beijing, where he placed fourth in the star class together with Mateusz Kusznierewicz.
