= Marin Lovrović Jr. =

Croatian sailor

Marin Lovrović (born 16 June 1973 in Rijeka) is a Croatian Olympic sailor in the Star class. He competed in the 2008 Summer Olympics together with Siniša Mikuličić, where he finished 15th and in the 2012 Summer Olympics, where he finished 16th together with his brother Dan.

Marin Lovrović has also competed together with his father Marin Lovrović Sr.
