= Scandinavian Gold Cup =

International sailing competition

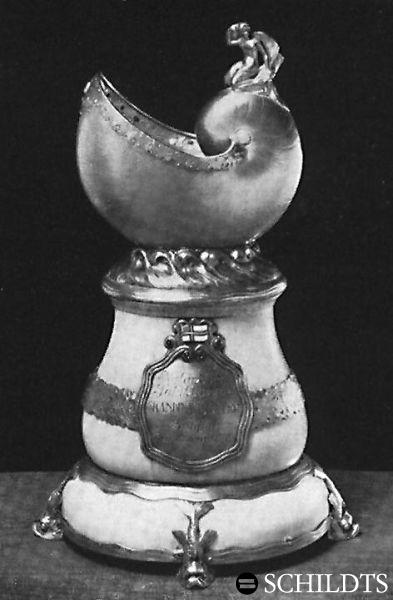
Scandinavian Gold Cup

Scandinavian Gold Cup is a sailing race held annually for 5.5 metre yachts. It is a nation race, meaning that each participant nation can send only one boat/team. Despite its name, it has been an international competition almost through its entire history, and participating is not limited to Scandinavian nations. The event has been held every year since 1919 (with exception of 1920 and 1940–46) making it one of the oldest active sailing trophies.

== History ==
The Cup was originally established by one of the oldest Finnish yacht clubs, Nyländska Jaktklubben (NJK) in 1919, to celebrate newly achieved Finnish independence, promote sailing and improve relations between Finnish and Swedish yacht racers. As such, it was a Cup for Scandinavian yachts only.

At first, the Cup was a challenge competition between Finland and Sweden and it was raced with 40m² Skerry cruisers. The first event was won by Swedes. In 1922, the event was handed over to the Scandinavian Yacht Racing Union (SYRU), which created an international competition based on the now-popular International 6 Metre class. It was intended to replace older One Ton Cup as an international prize for smaller, more affordable racing yachts.

1926 was the first year when competitors from outside the Nordic countries were allowed to enter and the Cup was soon established as one of the most coveted in the sailing world, attracting famous designers and competitors, including America's Cup winners.

By end of the 1930s, increasing costs began to decrease popularity of the 6 Metre class and it was gradually replaced by cheaper 5 Metre and 5.5 Metre classes. The Gold Cup was raced with 5.5 metre boats from 1953 onwards. It has continued to be raced annually, with the exception of 1986, when two competitions were held, and 2021 Cup which was cancelled through COVID. The 2006 Cup was held in the Netherlands, involved 11 nations and was for the first time won by a Dutch team.

The Cup held its centennial edition in July 2019.

== Editions ==
=== 40m² Skerry cruiser ===
Year	Gold	Silver	Bronze
1919			
1920	not held		
1921			

=== 6 metre ===
Year	Gold	Silver	Bronze
1922 Horten	Irene 5 (NOR); E. Lunde		
1923 Horten	Elisabeth 4 (NOR)		
1924 Hankø	Konkret (SWE); G. Lofmark		
1925 Marstand	Elisabeth 6 (NOR)		
1926 Hankø	Lanai (USA); Herman Whiton		
1927 Oyster Bay	May-Be (SWE); Sven Salén		
1928 Sandhamn	Figaro V (NOR); Claus Frimann-Dahl		
1929 Horten	Ingegerd (SWE); Hakon Reuter		
1930 Gothenburg	Ian (SWE); Arvid Schulz		
1931 Marstand	Abu (NOR); Johan Anker		
1932 Hankø	Abu (NOR); Magnus Konow		
1933 Hankø	KSSS 33 (SWE); Sven Salén		
1934 Sandhamn	White Lady (NOR); Magnus Konow		
1935 Hankø	Vigri (NOR); Magnus Konow		
1936 Hankø	Indian Scout (USA); Herman Whiton		
1937 Oyster Bay	Lulu (USA); B. Cunningham		
1938 Oyster Bay	Goose (USA); Georg Nichols		
1939 Helsinki	Goose (USA); Georg Nichols Jr.		
1940	not held		
1941	not held		
1942	not held		
1943	not held		
1944	not held		
1945	not held		
1946	not held		
1947 Oyster Bay	Goose (USA); B. Cunningham		
1948 Oyster Bay	Goose (USA); B. Cunningham		
1949 Hankø	May-Be VI (SWE); Claës-Henrik Nordenskiöld		
1950 Sandhamn	Trickson 6 (SWE); Arvid Laurin; Sven Rinman; Jan Georgii; Gunnar Rydholm; Lars Lundström		
1951 Helsinki	Elisabeth X (NOR); F. Ferner		
1952 Hankø	Elisabeth X (NOR); F. Ferner		

=== 5.5 metre ===
Year	Gold	Silver	Bronze
1953 Hankø	Ian IX (SWE); Claes Turitz		
1954 Marstrand	Ian IX (SWE); Claes Turitz; Hans Nilsson; Lars Nilsson		
1955 Sandhamn	Twins VII (ITA); Massimo Oberti		
1956 Genua	Norna VIII (NOR); Finn Christian Ferner		
1957 Hankø	Flame (USA); Robert Mosbacher		
1958 Kemah	Sabre (USA); E. B. Fay		
1959 Sandhamn	Rush V (SWE); Lars Thörn		
1960 Marstand	Wasa (SWE); Per Gedda		
1961 Helsinki	Nowa (SWE); Folke Wassén		
1962 Marstand	Pride (USA); E. B. Fay		
1963 Galveston Bay	Pride (USA); E. B. Fay		
1964 Sandhamn	Flame (USA); Albert Fay		
1965 Long Island Sound	Pride (USA); Albert Fay		
1966 Hankø	Pride (USA); E. B. Fay		
1967 Montagu Bay	Wasa III (SWE); Sundelin brothers		
1968 Sandhamn	Fram IV (NOR); Crown Prince Harald of Norway; Stein Föjen; Eirik Johannesen		
1969 Hankø	Pam (AUS); Gordon Ingate; Mick Morris; Ian Nathan		
1970 Sydney	Nemesis (USA); R. E. Turner III		
1971 Long Island Sound	Tiger (USA); R. E. Turner III		
1972 Hankø	Southern Cross (AUS); Frank Tolhurst		
1973 Lysekil	Sundance (USA); E. B. Fay		
1974 Sydney	John B (BAH); Robert Symonette		
1975 Hankø	Antares (AUS); Mick Morris		
1976 Hankø	Arunga (AUS); Frank Tolhurst		
1977 Benodet	John B (BAH); Robert Symonette; Gavin McKinney		
1978 Sandhamn	Arunga III (AUS); Frank Tolhurst		
1979 Hankø	Wildfire (USA); Albert Fay		
1980 Sydney	Arunga III (AUS); Frank Tolhurst		
1981 Nassau	Wildfire (USA); Albert Fay		
1982 Hankø	Ballymena (BAH); Robert Symonette; Gavin McKinney		
1983 Hankø	Ballymena (BAH); Robert Symonette; Gavin McKinney		
1984 Portocervo	Alzira (SUI); Willy Vollenweider		
1985 Newport Beach	Helena (FIN); Tom Jungell; Markus Mannström; Sakari Harima		
1986 Newport (58th)	Jan VI (AUS); Bruce Ritchie		
1986 Helsinki (59th) (Note: Scandinavian Gold Cup was held twice in 1986)	Tre gubbar (FIN); Jussi Gullichsen; Peter Fazer; Robert Mattsson		
1987 Hankø	Gorgi (USA); Robert Mosbacher		
1988 Lausanne	Artemis (SUI); Ronald Pieper		
1989 Houston	Gorgi (FIN); Henrik Lundberg; Tom Borenius; Brage Jansson		
1990 Torquay	Alfredo (NOR); Kalle Nergaard		
1991 Newport	Thunderbunny (USA); Michael Haines		
1992 Nassau	Alfredo (NOR); Kalle Nergaard; Kristian Nergaard; Harry Melges		
1993 Hankø	Zenda Corn (NOR); Kalle Nergaard		
1994 Crouesty	Zenda Corn (NOR); Kristian Nergaard; Kristen Horn Johannesen; Espen Stokkeland		
1995 Hanko	DoDoToo (FIN); Henrik Dahlman; Henrik Lundberg; Tom Borenius		
1996 Hankø	My Shout (USA); Glen Foster		
1997 Key Biscayne	Zenda Corn (NOR); John Platou		
1998 Cowes	My Shout (USA); Glen Foster; Mark Cowell; Bill Bennett		
1999 Torbole	My Shout (USA); Glen Foster; Ron Rosenberg; Bill Bennett		
2000 Medemblik	John B Once Again (BAH); Gavin McKinney; Lars Petter Fjeld; Craig Symonette; Harald Baars		
2001 Flensburg	John B Once Again (BAH); Gavin McKinney; Craig Symonette; Lars Horn Johannesen		
2002 Helsinki	Marie-Françoise XV (SUI); Jürg Menzi; Jürg Christen; Daniel Stampfli		
2003 Thun	Artemis X (NOR); Kristian Nergaard; Harry Melges; Petter Fjeld		
2004 Hankø	Artemis X (NOR); Kristian Nergaard; Ralph Junker; Peter Hauff		
2005 Sydney	Ali-Baba (SUI); Bruno Marazzi; Flavio Marazzi; Renato Marazzi		
2006 Medemblik	Maitresse (NED); Hans Nadorp; Erik Wesselman; Frans van Schellen		
2007 Sanremo	Ali Baba (SUI); Bruno Marazzi; Stefan Haftka; Renato Marazzi		
2008 Nassau	Artemis X (NOR); Kristian Nergaard; Johan Barne; Petrus Eide		
2009 Hanko	Artemis X (NOR); Kristian Nergaard; Johan Barne; Petrus Eide		
2010 Torbole	Artemis XIV (NOR); Kristian Nergaard; Peer Moberg; Petter Mørland Pedersen		
2011 Helsinki	Kan-Bej 2 (FIN); Kenneth Thelen; Thomas Hallberg; Robert Nyberg	Artemis X (NOR); Kristian Nergaard; Trond Solli-Sæther; Peer Moberg	Caracole (FRA); Bernard Haissly; Nicolas Berthoud; Daniel Stampfli
2012 Boltenhagen	Addam 4 (FIN); Johan Gullichsen; Henrik Lundberg; Timo Telkola	Norway; Kristian Nergaard	France; Bernard Haissly
2013 Curaçao	Artemis X (NOR); Kristoffer Spone; Johan Barne; Trond Solli-Sæther		
2014 Porto Santo Stefano	Mission Possible (GER); Markus Wieser; Thomas Auracher	Marie-Françoise XVIII (SUI); Juerg Menzi	NOR 57(c) Artemis XIV (NOR); Kristian Nergaard
2015 Nynäshamn	Caracole (FRA); Bernard Haissly; Daniel Stampfli; Nicolas Berthoud		
2016 Copenhagen	DEN 19 - Arnold P (DEN); Bo Selko; Rasmus Knude; Mikael Petersen		
2017 Benodet	SUI 218 - Marie-Françoise XIX (SUI); Jürg Menzi; Rasmus Knude; Christof Wilke		
2018 Cowes	NOR 57(c) Artemis XIV (NOR); Kristian Nergaard; Kristoffer Spone; Trond Solli-Sæther		
2019 Helsinki	NOR 57(c) Artemis XIV (NOR); Kristian Nergaard; Johan Barne; Trond Solli-Sæther		
2020 Pittwater	NOR 57(c) Artemis XIV; Kristian Nergaard; Johan Barne; Anders Pedersen		
2021	Cancelled COVID-19		
2022 Hanko	GBR 42 - Jean Genie; Elliot Hanson; Andrew Palfrey; Sam Haines	BAH 24 - New Moon 2 Mark Holowesko; Christoph Burger; Peter Vlasov	AUS 66 - Kuringai 3 John Bacon; James Majgor; Terry Wetton
2023	GBR 43 - Jean Genie; Peter Morton; Andrew Palfrey; Ruairadh Scott		
2024	Ali Baba; Flavio Marazzi; Julie Marazzi; Eline Marazzi		
2025	NOR 57(c) Artemis XIV; Kristian Nergaard; Johan Barne; Anders Pedersen		
2026 Greece	EVENT CANCELLED DUE TO HEAVY WEATHER		
