= 5.5 Metre World Championship =

International sailing regatta

The 5.5 Metre World Championship are international sailing regatta in the 5.5 Metre class organized by the host club and the International 5.5 Metre Class Association and recognized by the World Sailing.

The most titles have been won by Norwegian sailor Kristian Nergaard, with eleven titles between 1990 and 2020 and another six silver medals. The second most titles have been won by Swiss sailor Flavio Marazzi and Swedish sailor Johan Barne, both with six.

The 5.5 Metre was an Olympic class from 1952 to 1968.

== History ==
The first 5.5 Metre World Championship were held in Helsinki in 1961.

== Editions ==
Host clubs of the 5.5 Metre World Championship
Host clubs of the 5.5 Metre World Championship

| Ed. | Date | | Location | | | Boats | Sailors | | | | | Ref. |
| Ed. | Day/Month | Year | Host club | City | Country | Boats | No. | M | F | Nat. | Cont. | Ref. |
|---|---|---|---|---|---|---|---|---|---|---|---|---|
| 1 | | 1961 | | Helsinki | Finland | 38 | | | | | | |
| 2 | | 1962 | | Poole | United Kingdom | 25 | | | | | | |
| 3 | | 1963 | Seawanhaka Corinthian Yacht Club | Seawanhaka | United States | | | | | | | |
| N/A | | 1964 | | Tokyo | Japan | part of the 1964 Summer Olympics | | | | | | |
| 4 | | 1965 | | Naples | Italy | | | | | | | |
| 5 | | 1966 | | Copenhagen | Denmark | | | | | | | |
| 6 | | 1967 | Nassau Yacht Club | Nassau | Bahamas | | | | | | | |
| N/A | | 1968 | | Acapulco | Mexico | part of the 1968 Summer Olympics | | | | | | |
| 7 | | 1969 | | Sandhamn | Sweden | | | | | | | |
| 8 | 19–26 Feb | 1970 | | Broken Bay | Australia | | | | | | | |
| 9 | | 1971 | | Seawanhaka | United States | | | | | | | |
| 10 | | 1972 | Société Nautique de Genève | Geneva | Switzerland | | | | | | | |
| 11 | | 1973 | | Lysekil | Sweden | | | | | | | |
| 12 | | 1974 | | Sydney | Australia | | | | | | | |
| 13 | | 1975 | | Neuchâtel | Switzerland | | | | | | | |
| 14 | | 1976 | | Hankø | Norway | | | | | | | |
| 15 | | 1977 | | Bénodet | France | 22 | | | | | | |
| 16 | | 1978 | | Sandhamn | Sweden | 19 | | | | | | |
| 17 | | 1979 | | Hankø | Norway | 19 | | | | | | |
| 18 | | 1980 | | Sydney | Australia | 19 | | | | | | |
| 19 | 24-30 Mar. | 1981 | | Nassau | Bahamas | 18 | | | | | | |
| 20 | | 1982 | Société Nautique de Genève | Geneva | Switzerland | 40 | | | | | | |
| 21 | 9-16 July | 1983 | | Hankø | Norway | 26 | | | | | | |
| 22 | 17-27 Sept. | 1984 | | Porto Cervo | Italy | 22 | | | | | | |
| 23 | 9-16 Sept. | 1985 | Bahia Corinthian Yacht Club | Newport Beach | United States | 14 | | | | | | |
| 24 | | 1986 | | Sydney | Australia | 18 | | | | | | |
| 25 | 9-17 July | 1987 | | Hankø | Norway | 31 | | | | | | |
| 26 | 6-14 May | 1988 | Société Nautique de Genève | Geneva | Switzerland | 52 | | | | | | |
| 27 | | 1989 | | Houston | United States | 18 | | | | | | |
| 28 | | 1990 | Royal Torbay Yacht Club | Torquay | United Kingdom | 24 | | | | | | |
| 29 | | 1991 | Royal Prince Alfred Yacht Club | Sydney | Australia | 15 | | | | | | |
| 30 | 7-13 Apr. | 1992 | | Nassau | Bahamas | 20 | | | | | | |
| 31 | | 1993 | Hankø Yacht Club | Hankø | Norway | 33 | | | | | | |
| 32 | | 1994 | Yacht Club Crouesty Arzon | Crouesty | France | 41 | | | | | | |
| 33 | 8-12 Aug | 1995 | Hankø Yacht Club | Hankø | Norway | 18 | | | | | | |
| 34 | 13-20 July | 1996 | | Muiden | Netherlands | 41 | | | | | | |
| 35 | 16-21 Nov. | 1997 | Key Biscayne Yacht Club | Miami | United States | 12 | | | | | | |
| 36 | | 1998 | Royal Corinthian Yacht Club of Cowes | Cowes | United Kingdom | 26 | | | | | | |
| 37 | 12-19 Sept. | 1999 | | Torbole | Italy | 32 | | | | | | |
| 38 | 22 Jul to 4 Aug | 2000 | | Medemblik | Netherlands | 34 | | | | | | |
| 39 | 6-14 June | 2001 | Flensburg Segel-Club | Flensburg | Denmark | 38 | | | | | | |
| 40 | 16-27 July | 2002 | Nyländska Jaktklubben (NJK) | Helsinki | Finland | 29 | | | | | | |
| 41 | 24-29 Aug. | 2003 | Yacht Club de l'Odet | Bénodet | France | 36 | 108 | | | 10 | 3 | |
| 42 | 6-10 Sep. | 2004 | Circolo Vela Torbole | Torbole | Italy | 36 | 108 | | | 11 | 3 | |
| 43 | 4-10 Jan | 2005 | Royal Sydney Yacht Squadron | Sydney | Australia | 27 | | | | 8+ | 3+ | |
| 44 | 28 July to 2 Aug | 2006 | | Medemblik | Netherlands | 41 | 123 | | | 11 | 3 | |
| 45 | 15-21 Sept. | 2007 | Yacht Club Sanremo | Sanremo | Italy | 38 | 114 | | | 12 | 3 | |
| 46 | 9-14 Mar. | 2008 | Nassau Yacht Club | Nassau | Bahamas | 18 | 54 | | | 8 | 3 | |
| 47 | 7-10 June | 2009 | Hankø Yacht Club / Kongelig Norsk Seilforening (KNS) | Hanko | Norway | 30 | 90 | | | 11 | 3 | |
| 48 | 5-10 Sep. | 2010 | Circolo Vela Torbole | Lake Garda | Italy | 30 | 90 | | | 11 | 3 | |
| 49 | 31 July to 5 Aug | 2011 | HSS Yacht Club | Helsinki | Finland | 29 | 87 | | | 10 | 2 | |
| 50 | 9-14 Sept. | 2012 | Norddeutscher Regatta Verein | Boltenhagen | Germany | 37 | 111 | | | 9 | 2 | |
| 51 | 28 Jan -1 Feb | 2013 | Hyatt Regency Hotel | Curacao | Netherlands Antilles | 21 | 63 | | | 8 | 2 | |
| 52 | 15-28 Sept. | 2014 | Yacht Club Santo Stefano | Porto Santo Stefano | Italy | 37 | | | | 8+ | 2+ | |
| 53 | 24-29 Aug. | 2015 | Nynäshamn Yacht Club | Nynäshamn | Sweden | 30 | 90 | | | 9 | 3 | |
| 54 | 16-26 Aug | 2016 | Royal Danish Yacht Club | | Denmark | 35 | 105 | | | 10 | 2 | |
| 55 | 4-9 Sept. | 2017 | Yacht Club de l'Odet | Bretagne | France | 27 | 81 | 75 | 6 | 12 | 3 | # |
| 56 | 20-24 Aug | 2018 | Royal Yacht Squadron | Cowes | United Kingdom | 25 | 75 | | | 12 | 2 | |
| 57 | 27 July to 2 Aug | 2019 | Nylandska Jaktklubben | Helsinki | Finland | 24 | 72 | | | 9 | 3 | |
| 58 | 9-13 Jan | 2020 | Royal Prince Alfred Yacht Club | Newport, New South Wales | Australia | 24 | 72 | 71 | 1 | 10 | 3 | |
| N/A | 6-8 Aug | 2021 | Hankø Yacht Club | Hankø | Norway | Cancelled COVID 19 | | | | | | |
| 59 | | 2022 | Hankø Yacht Club / Kongelig Norsk Seilforening | Hankø | Norway | 23 | 70 | 64 | 6 | 11 | 3 | |
| 60 | 20-30 Sept. | 2023 | Yacht Club Costa Smeralda | Porto Cervo, Sardinia | Italy | 34 | 102 | | | 12 | 3 | |
| 61 | 2-6 Sept. | 2024 | Yacht Club de l'Odet | l'Odet | France | 29 | 87 | 81 | 6 | 12 | 3 | |
| 62 | 9-13 Jun | 2025 | Towarzystwo Żeglarstwa Regatowego | Sopot | Poland | 20 | 60 | 57 | 3 | 12 | 3 | |
| 63 | Oct. | 2026 | Yacht Club of Greece | Lavrion | Greece | 19 | 57 | 52 | 5 | 11 | 3 | |

== Multiple World champions ==
Compiled from the data below the table includes up to and including 2026.

| Ranking | Sailor | Gold | Silver | Bronze | Total | No. Entries |
| 1 | Kristian Nergaard (NOR) | 11 | 8 | 3 | 22 | 25 |
| 2 | Flavio Marazzi (SUI) | 6 | 4 | 1 | 11 | 15 |
| 2 | Johan Barne (SWE) | 6 | 4 | 1 | 11 | 12 |
| 4 | Trond Solli Sæther (NOR) | 4 | 6 | 2 | 12 | 13 |
| 5 | Frank Tolhurst (AUS) | 3 | 2 | 1 | 6 | 11 |
| 6 | Stefan Haftka (SUI) | 3 | 2 | 0 | 5 | 5 |
| 7 | Glen Foster (USA) | 3 | 1 | 2 | 6 | 7 |
| 8 | Philippe Dürr (SUI) | 3 | 1 | 1 | 5 | 9 |
| 9 | Ronald Pieper (SUI) | 3 | 1 | 0 | 4 | 10 |
| 10 | Harry Melges Ii (USA) | 3 | 0 | 1 | 4 | 5 |
| 10 | Andrew Palfrey (AUS) | 3 | 0 | 1 | 4 | 7 |
| 12 | Mark Covell (GBR) | 3 | 0 | 0 | 3 | 7 |
| 13 | Jürg Menzi (SUI) | 2 | 5 | 2 | 9 | 26 |
| 14 | Christoph Burger (SUI) | 2 | 5 | 0 | 7 | 16 |
| 15 | Daniel Stampfli (SUI) | 2 | 4 | 1 | 7 | 25 |
| 16 | Robert Symonette (BAH) | 2 | 3 | 1 | 6 | 14 |
| 17 | Christen Horn Johannessen (NOR) | 2 | 2 | 2 | 6 | 10 |
| 18 | Juerg Christen (SUI) | 2 | 2 | 0 | 4 | 4 |
| 19 | Mateusz Kusznierewicz (POL) | 2 | 1 | 1 | 4 | 4 |
| 19 | Jochen Schümann (GER) | 2 | 1 | 1 | 4 | 5 |
| 19 | Kalle Nergaard (NOR) | 2 | 1 | 1 | 4 | 6 |
| 19 | Przemek Gacek (POL) | 2 | 1 | 1 | 4 | 4 |
| 23 | Peter Van Niekerk (NED) | 2 | 1 | 0 | 3 | 3 |
| 24 | Edward Wright (GBR) | 2 | 0 | 1 | 3 | 3 |
| 25 | Christian Wahl (SUI) | 2 | 0 | 0 | 2 | 6 |
| 25 | Jon Mitchell (AUS) | 2 | 0 | 0 | 2 | 2 |
| 25 | Phillip Smidmore (AUS) | 2 | 0 | 0 | 2 | 3 |
| 25 | Pierre Bonjour (SUI) | 2 | 0 | 0 | 2 | 2 |

== Medalists ==
| Year | Gold | Silver | Bronze | Ref. |
|---|---|---|---|---|
| 1961 Helsinki; 38 Boats | Z 36 - Ylliam XIV; Louis Noverraz (SUI); Unknown; Unknown | D 10 - Web II; William Eldred Berntsen (DEN); Paul Elvstrøm (DEN); Unknown | I 33 - Volpina; Giulio Cesare Carcano (ITA); Unknown; Unknown | |
| 1962 Poole; 25 Boats | US-21 Complex III; Britton Chance (USA); Unknown; Unknown | BA-1 John B3; Robert Symonette (BAH); Unknown; Unknown | K-32 Bjarne; Chris Hall (GBR); Unknown; Unknown | |
| 1963 Seawanhaka; Boats | Chaje II; Raymond Hunt (USA); Unknown; Unknown | Rush VII; Lars Thörn (SWE); Unknown; Unknown | Pride; Ernest Fay (USA); Unknown; Unknown | |
| 1964 | Not Held - Olympic Year | | | |
| 1965 Napoli; Boats | I-42 - Grifone; Agostino Straulino (ITA); Unknown; Unknown | KA-9 - Southern Cross III; Norman Booth (AUS); Unknown; Unknown | US-51 - Complex V Gardner Cox (USA); Unknown; Unknown | |
| 1966 Copenhagen; Boats | D-11 Web III; Paul Bert Elvstrøm (DEN); Strit Johansen; Paul Mik Meyer | G-13 Sünnschien; Rudi Harmsdorf (GER); Unknown; Unknown | K - Yeoman; Robin Aisher (GBR); Unknown; Unknown | |
| 1967 Nassau; Boats | US-72 Cloud IX; Gordon Lindemann (USA); Gordon Bowers (USA); Harry Melges II (USA) | K-35 - Yeoman XV; Robin Aisher (GBR); Unknown; Unknown | US - Cadenza; Gardner Cox (USA); Unknown; Unknown | |
| 1968 | Not Held - Olympic Year | | | |
| 1969 Sandhamn; Boats | F-98 - Cybèle; Jean-Marie le Guillou (FRA); Nikolas le Guillou; Daniel Tassin | S-51 - Wasa IV; Ulf Sundelin (SWE); Jörgen Sundelin; Peter Sundelin | KA-24 - Tomatoe; Thomas B. Nathhorst (SWE); Håkan Lindquist; Claes Boje | |
| 1970 Sydney; Boats | KA-25 Carabella; David Forbes (AUS); Kevin McCann (AUS); Jim Gannon (AUS) | US-73 Nemesis; Ted Turner (USA); Unknown; Unknown | US-81 Sundance; Ernest Fay (USA); Lawrence B Neuhaus (USA); Andrew L Johnston (USA) | |
| 1971 Seawanhaka; Boats | US-83 Tiger; Ted Turner (USA); Unknown; Unknown | KA-25 Carabella; David Forbes (AUS); Unknown; Unknown | N-33 Bingo II; King Olav (NOR); Unknown; Unknown | |
| 1972 Genève; Boats | Z-83 Alphée VI; Claude Bigar (SUI); Unknown; Unknown | US-83 Tiger; Ted Turner (USA); Unknown; Unknown | US-81 Sundance; Ernest Fay (USA); Unknown; Unknown | |
| 1973 Lysekil; Boats | US-81 Sundance; Ernest Fay (USA); Harry Melges II (USA); Henry R. Johnston (USA) | BA-1 John B V Robert Symonette (BAH); Unknown; Unknown | KA-29 Antares; M. Morris (AUS); Unknown; Unknown | |
| 1974 Sydney; Boats | KA-31 - Southern Cross IV; Norman Booth (AUS); Peter O'Donnell (AUS); Carl Ryves (AUS) | N-34(KA-32) Skagerak; Crown Prince Harald (NOR); Unknown; Unknown | KA-26 Barragoola; R. Slade (AUS); Unknown; Unknown | |
| 1975 Neuchâtel; Boats | no champion decided | | | |
| 1976 Hankø; Boats | KA-28 Arunga; Frank Tolhurst (AUS); Mark Tolhurst (AUS); Norman Hyett (AUS) | US-81 Sundance; Ted Turner (USA); Unknown; Unknown | N-65 Bingo II; King Olav (NOR); Unknown; Unknown | |
| 1977 Bénodet; 22 Boats | KA 31 - Antares II; Harold Vaughan (AUS); Ron McLaine (AUS); Phil Smidmore (AUS) | John B Robert Symonette (BAH); Ulf Sundelin (SWE); Gavin McKinney (BAH) | Z-112 Odyssée V Jean Lauener (SUI); Unknown; Unknown | |
| 1978 Sandhamn; 19 Boats | KA 31 - Arunga III; Frank Tolhurst (AUS); Jon Mitchell (AUS); Steve Gosling (AUS) | Z-102 - Ilias; Hans Aeppli (SUI); Unknown; Unknown | Z-114 - Joker IV; Thomas Sprecher (SUI); Unknown; Unknown | |
| 1979 Hankø; 19 Boats | KH-31 Arunga III; Frank Tolhurst (AUS); Jon Mitchell (AUS); Keith Ravell (AUS) | L-30 Patricia; M. Rouhiainen (FIN); Unknown; Unknown | US-84 Wildfire; Albert Fay (USA); Unknown; Unknown | |
| 1980 Sydney; 19 Boats | BA-1 John B 6 Robert Symonette (BAH); Unknown; Unknown | KA-31 Arunga III; Frank Tolhurst (AUS); Unknown; Unknown | US-84 Wildfire; Albert Fay (USA); Unknown; Unknown | |
| 1981 Nassau; 18 Boats | KA-35 - Rapsody; Roy Tutty (AUS); Phil Smidmore (AUS); Colin Beashal (AUS) | KA-31 - Arunga III; Frank Tolhurst (AUS); Mark Tolhurst (AUS); Unknown | BA-11 - Pop's John B Robert Symonette (BAH); Gavin McKinney (BAH); Unknown | |
| 1982 Genève; 40 Boats | Z-129 Saphir; Jean-Claude Vuithier (SUI); Jean-Phillipe L'Huillier (SUI); Jacques Sarasin (SUI) | Z-134 - Onyx; Pierre-Yeves Firmenich (SUI): Psarophagis; Truant | Z-130 Naryl; Philippe Dürr (SUI): Homberger; Lehmann | |
| 1983 Hankø; 26 Boats | US-87 - Firestorm; Albert Fay (USA); Harry Melges II (USA); Douglas E. Johnston Jr (USA) | SWE 59 - Arunga IV; Jens Busch (SWE); Pontus Frösell; Richard Sterner | US-86 - Warrior III; T. Omohundro (USA); Unknown; Unknown | |
| 1984 Porto Cervo; 22 Boats | Z-130 - Naryl; Philippe Dürr (SUI): Vouga; Homberger | N-35 - Norna XI; Prince Harald (NOR); Unknown; Unknown | US-88 - Warrior III; T. Omohundro (USA); Unknown; Unknown | |
| 1985 Newport Beach; 14 Boats | Z-130 Sinaryl; Philippe Dürr (SUI); Unknown; Unknown | US-88 - Warrior IV; T. Omohundro (USA); Unknown; Unknown | US-86 Morea; Robert Mosbacher (USA); Unknown; Unknown | |
| 1986 Sydney; 18 Boats | BA-1 John B VII; Robert Symonette (BAH); Ulf Sundelin (SWE); Michael Baker-Harber (GBR) | L-31 - Helena; T. Jungell (FIN); Unknown; Unknown | BA-11 - Busy B J.E. Dyvi (NOR); Unknown; Unknown | |
| 1987 Hankø; 31 Boats | Z-142 - Artémis VII; Ronald Pieper (SUI); Unknown; Unknown | L-31 - Vinnia; Peter Tallberg (FIN); Unknown; Unknown | US 87 - Firestorm; Albert Fay (USA); Unknown; Unknown | |
| 1988 Genève; 52 Boats | Z-150 - Tasman; Rico Gregorini (SUI); Unknown; Unknown | Z-130 - Sinaryl; Philippe Dürr (SUI); Unknown; Unknown | Z-144 - Maria-Christina; Jürg Weber (SUI); Unknown; Unknown | |
| 1989 Houston; 18 Boats | US-87 - Firestorm; George Francisco IV (USA); Unknown; Unknown | US-93 - Above the Line; Peter Masterson (USA); Tom Dickey; Unknown | KA-51 - Southern Cross 5 Frank Tolhurst (AUS); Unknown; Unknown | |
| 1990 Torquay; 24 Boats | N-55 - Alfredo; Kalle Nergaard (NOR); Kristian Nergaard (NOR); Espen Stokkeland (NOR) | US-93 - Above the Line; Peter Masterson (USA); Tom Dickey; Unknown | US-87 - Firestorm; Albert Fay (USA); Harry Melges II (USA); Douglas R Peterson (USA) | |
| 1991 Sydney; 15 Boats | Z-169 - Chlika-Chlika; Christian Wahl (SUI); Philippe Dürr (SUI); Pierre Bonjour (SUI) | US-95 - Thunderbunny; M. Haines (USA); Unknown; Unknown | N-55 - Alfredo; Kalle Nergaard (NOR); Kristian Nergaard (NOR); Herman Horn Johannesen (NOR) | |
| 1992 Nassau; 20 Boats | Z-169 - Chlika-Chlika; Christian Wahl (SUI); Pierre Bonjour (SUI); Alain Marchand (SUI) | US-93 - Above the Line; Peter Masterson (USA); Tom Dickey; Unknown | L-39 - Dodo; Henrik Dahlmann (FIN); Unknown; Unknown | |
| 1993 Hankø; 33 Boats | NOR-57 - Zenda Corn; Kristian Nergaard (NOR); Kalle Nergaard; Christen Horn Johannesen | FIN-40 - DoDo Too; Henrik Dahlmann (FIN); Unknown; Unknown | USA-97 - My Shout; Glen Foster (USA); Unknown; Unknown | |
| 1994 Crouesty; 41 Boats | Z-181 - Odyssée Junior; Dominique Lauener (SUI); Unknown; Unknown | N-57 - Zenda Corn; Kalle Nergaard (NOR); Kristian Nergaard (NOR); Christen Horn Johannesen (NOR) | FRA-49 - Romeo e Giulietta; Marc Pajot (FRA); Unknown; Unknown | |
| 1995 Hanko; 18 Boats | USA-97 - My Shout; Glen Foster (USA); Unknown; Unknown | Z 181 - Odyssée Junior; Dominique Lauener (SUI); Unknown; Unknown | FIN-40 Dododoo; Henrik Dahlmann (FIN); Unknown; Unknown | |
| 1996 Muiden; 41 Boats | N-57 - Zenda Corn; Kristian Nergaard (NOR); Christen Horn Johannesen (NOR); Dag Usterud (NOR) | USA-97 - My Shout; Glen Foster (USA); Unknown; Unknown | SUI-188 - Baba Jaga; Christof Wilke (SUI); Unknown; Unknown | |
| 1997 Key Biscane; 12 Boats | USA-97 - My Shout; Glen Foster (USA); Ronald Rosenburg (USA); Mark Covell (GBR) | SUI-199 - Ali Baba; Bruno Marazzi (SUI); Flavio Marazzi (SUI); Renato Marazzi (SUI) | FIN-44 - Kandoo; Erik Dahlmann (FIN); Mathias Dahlmann; Tom Borrenius | |
| 1998 Cowes; 26 Boats | USA-97 - My Shout; Glen Foster (USA); Mark Covell (GBR); William Bennet (USA) | SUI-194 Marie-Françoise XIII; Jürg Menzi (SUI); Dino Fumasoli (SUI); Daniel Stampfli (SUI) | SUI-192 Artémis X Roni Pieper (SUI); Mark Dangel (SUI); Ralph Junker (SUI) | |
| 1999 Torbole; 32 Boats | SUI 201 - Marie Francoise XIV; Jürg Menzi (SUI); Juerg Christen (SUI); Daniel Stampfli (SUI) | SUI 199 - Ali Baba; Bruno Marazzi (SUI); Flavio Marazzi (SUI); Renato Marazzi (SUI) | USA 97 - My Shout; Glen Foster (USA); Ronald Rosenburg (USA); William Bennet (USA) | |
| 2000 Medemblik; 34 Boats | SUI 201 - Marie Francoise XIV; Jürg Menzi (SUI); Daniel Stampfli; Jürg Christen | SUI 189 - Pungin; Hans-Peter Schmid (SUI); Lionel Rupp; Roland Baumgartner | BAH 17 - John B Once Again; Gavin McKinney (BAH); Lars Petter Fjeld (NOR); Craig Symonette (BAH) | |
| 2001 Glücksburg; 38 Boats | SUI 205 - Artémis XI; Jochen Schümann (GER); Roni Pieper (SUI); Peter van Niekerk (NED) | SUI 204 - Marie-Françoise XV; Jürg Menzi (SUI); Jürg Christen (SUI); Daniel Stamfli (SUI) | BAH 17 - John B Once Again; Gavin McKinney (BAH); Craig Symonette (BAH); Joe Thompson | |
| 2002 Helsinki; 29 Boats | SUI 206 - Ali Baba; Bruno Marazzi (SUI); Flavio Marazzi (SUI); Renato Marazzi (SUI) | SUI 204 - Marie Francoise XV; Jürg Menzi (SUI); Juerg Christen (SUI); Daniel Stampfli (SUI) | BAH 17 - John B Once Again; Gavin McKinney (BAH); Craig Symonette (BAH); Lars Horn Johannessen (NOR) | |
| 2003 Bénodet; 36 Boats | NOR 57(b) - Artémis XII; Kristian Nergaard (NOR); Mark Covell (GBR); Peter Hauff (NOR) | FIN 47 - Addam^{3} Johan Gullichsen (FIN); Henrik Lundberg (FIN); Timo Telkola (FIN) | SUI 204 - Marie-Françoise XV; Jürg Menzi (SUI); Leonardi Gaume (SUI); Daniel Stamfli (SUI) | |
| 2004 Torbole; 36 Boats | SUI 206 - Ali Baba; Flavio Marazzi (SUI); Enrico De Maria (SUI); Stefan Haftka (SUI) | SUI 204 - Marie-Françoise XV; Jürg Menzi (SUI); Leonardi Gaume (SUI); Daniel Stamfli (SUI) | FIN 47 - Addam^{3} Johan Gullichsen (FIN); Henrik Lundberg (FIN); Timo Telkola (FIN) | |
| 2005 Sydney; 27 Boats | SUI 210 - Artémis X Jochen Schümann (GER); Roni Pieper (SUI); Peter van Niekerk (NED) | FIN 47 - Addam^{3} Johan Gullichsen (FIN); Unknown; Unknown | SUI 206 - Ali Baba; Bruno Marazzi (SUI); Flavio Marazzi (SUI); Unknown | |
| 2006 Medemblik; 41 Boats | SUI 219 - Ali Baba; Flavio Marazzi (SUI); Etienne Huter; Stefan Haftka | SUI 220 - Artémis XI; Jochen Schümann (GER); Peter van Niekerk (NED); Ronald Pieper (SUI) | NED 35 - Maitresse; Hans Nadorp (NED); Frans van Schellen (NED); Erik Wesselman (NED) | |
| 2007 Sanremo; Boats | SUI 219 - Ali Baba; Flavio Marazzi (SUI); Stefan Haftka (SUI); Erkki Heinonen (FIN) | NOR 57(c) (SUI 220) - Artemis XIV; Kristian Nergaard (NOR); Mark Strube (USA); Harald Blom Bakke (NOR) | BAH 19 - John B Gavin McKinney (BAH); Peter Hauff (NOR); Petter Field (NOR) | |
| 2008 Nassau; 18 Boats | NOR 57(c) - Artemis XIV; Kristian Nergaard (NOR); Harry Melges III (USA); Mark Strube (USA) | SUI 219 - Ali Baba; Flavio Marazzi (SUI); Stefan Haftka (SUI); Renato Marazzi (SUI) | BAH 19 - John B Gavin McKinney (BAH); Peter Hauff (NOR); Lars Horn Johannesen (NOR) | |
| 2009 Hankø; Boats | NOR 57(c) - Artemis XIV; Kristian Nergaard (NOR); Johan Barne (SWE); Petrus Eide (NOR) | NOR 65 - Odlo; Christoph Burger (NOR); Christof Wilke (SUI); Marcel Simon (SUI) | NOR 64 - Clark Kent; Petter Fjeld (NOR); Christen Horn Johannessen (NOR); Thomas Borgen (NOR) | |
| 2010 Lake Garda; 29 Boats | SUI - Ali-Baba; Flavio Marazzi (SUI); Andrew Palfrey (AUS); Christof Wilke (SUI) | NOR 57(c) - Artemis XIV; Kristian Nergaard (NOR); Peer Moberg (NOR); Petter Mørland Pedersen (NOR) | FIN 66 - Kan-Bei 2 Kenneth Thelen (FIN); Thomas Hallberg (FIN); Robert Nyberg (FIN) | |
| 2011 Helsinki; 29 Boats | FIN 66 - Kan-Bei 2 Kenneth Thelen (FIN); Thomas Hallberg (FIN); Robert Nyberg (FIN) | NOR 57(c) - Artemis XIV; Kristian Nergaard (NOR); Trond Solli Sæther (NOR); Christen Horn Johannessen (NOR) | SUI 222 - Marie Françoise XVIII; Jürg Menzi (SUI); Andreas Honegger; Christof Wilke (SUI) | |
| 2012 Boltenhagen; 37 Boats | NOR 57(c) - Artemis XIV; Kristian Nergaard (NOR); Johan Barne (SWE); Trond Solli Sæther (NOR) | SUI 224 - Ali-Baba; Flavio Marazzi (SUI); Stefan Haftka; Marc Friedrich | GER 55 - Oro Nero; Jochen Schümann (GER); Henning Ueck (GER); Ole Hansen (GER) | |
| 2013 Curaçao; 21 Boats | GER 79; Marcus Wieser (GER); Frithjof Kleen (GER); Thomas Auracher (GER) | NOR 57(c) - Artemis XIV; Kristian Nergaard (NOR); Johan Barne (SWE); Trond Solli Sæther (NOR) | NOR 64 - Clark Kent; Petter Fjeld (NOR); Thomas Borgen (NOR); Christen Horn Johannessen (NOR) | |
| 2014 Porto Santo Stefano; 37 Boats | SUI 224 - Ali Baba; Flavio Marazzi (SUI); Jakob Gustafsson (SWE); Christoph Burger (SUI) | NOR 57(c) - Artemis XIV; Kristian Nergaard (NOR); Johan Barne (SWE); Trond Solli Sæther (NOR) | BAH 19 - John B Gavin McKinney (BAH); Thomas Hallberg (FIN); Lars Horn Johannessen (NOR) | |
| 2015 Nynäshamn; 29 Boats | NOR 57(c) - Artemis XIV; Kristian Nergaard (NOR); Johan Barne (SWE); Trond Solli Sæther (NOR) | BAH 22 - John B Gavin McKinney (BAH); Thomas Hallberg (FIN); Lars Horn Johannessen (NOR) | BAH 21 - New Moon; Mark Holowesko (BAH); Petter Mørland Pedersen (NOR); Peter Vlasov (BAH) | |
| 2016 Copenhagen; 35 Boats | NOR 57(c) - Artemis XIV; Kristian Nergaard (NOR); Johan Barne (SWE); Trond Solli Sæther (NOR) | DEN 19 - Arnold P Bo Selko (DEN); Rasmus Knude; Mikael Pedersen | BAH 22 - John B Gavin McKinney (BAH); Thomas Hallberg (FIN); Lars Horn Johannessen (NOR) | |
| 2017 Bénodet; 26 Boats | BAH 22 - John B Gavin McKinney (BAH); Mathias Dahlman (FIN); Lars Horn Johannessen (NOR) | BAH 21 - New Moon; Mark Holowesko (BAH); Christoph Burger (SUI); Peter Vlasov (BAH) | NED 26 - Feng Shui; Arend Jan Pasman (NED); Ron Azier; Kim Chabani | |
| 2018 Cowes; Boats | BAH 21 - New Moon; Mark Holowesko (BAH); Christoph Burger (SUI); Peter Vlasov (BAH) | SUI 218 - Marie Françoise XVX; Jürg Menzi (SUI); Jurgen Eiermann (GER); Bo Selko (DEN) | NOR 57(c) - Artemis XIV; Kristian Nergaard (NOR); Kristoffer Spone (NOR); Trond Solli Sæther (NOR) | |
| 2019 Helsinki; 24 Boats | NOR 57(c) - Artemis XIV; Kristian Nergaard (NOR); Johan Barne (SWE); Trond Solli Sæther (NOR) | BAH 21 - New Moon; Mark Holowesko (BAH); Christoph Burger (SUI); Peter Vlasov (BAH) | BAH 22 - John B Gavin McKinney (BAH); Mathias Dahlman (FIN); Lars Horn Johannessen (NOR) | |
| 2020 Pittwater; 24 Boats | NOR 57(c) - Artemis XIV; Kristian Nergaard (NOR); Johan Barne (SWE); Anders Pedersen (NOR) | BAH 24 - New Moon; Mark Holowesko (BAH); Christoph Burger (SUI); Peter Vlasov (BAH) | BAH 23 - Ali Baba; Craig Symonette (BAH); Flavio Marazzi (SUI); Will Alloway (GBR) | |
| 2021 | Cancelled due to COVID 19 | | | |
| 2022 Hankø; 23 Boats | GBR 42 - Jean Genie; Elliot Hanson (GBR); Andrew Palfrey (AUS); Samuel Haines (AUS) | BAH 24 - NEW MOON II; Mark Holowesko (BAH); Christoph Burger (SUI); Anthony Nossiter (AUS) | NOR 57(c) - Artemis; Kristian Nergaard (NOR); Johan Barne (SWE); Trond Solli Sæther (NOR) | |
| 2023 Porto Cervo; 34 Boats | POL 17 - Aspire; Mateusz Kusznierewicz (POL); Przemysław Gacek (POL); Ed Wright (GBR) | NOR 57(c) - Artemis; Kristian Nergaard (NOR); Johan Barne (SWE); Trond Solli Sæther (NOR) | AUS 66 - Ku-Ring-Gai 3 John Bacon (AUS); James Mayjor (AUS); Terry Wetton (AUS) | |
| 2024 l'Odet; 29 Boats | AUS 66 - Ku-Ring-Gai 3 John Bacon (AUS); Joost Houwling (NED); Ed Wright (GBR) | NOR 57(c) - Artemis; Kristian Nergaard (NOR); Johan Barne (SWE); Trond Solli Sæther (NOR) | POL 17 - Aspire; Przemysław Gacek (POL); Mateusz Kusznierewicz (POL); Killian Weise (GER) | |
| 2025 Sopot; 20 Boats | GBR 43 - Jean Genie 2 Peter Morton (GBR); Andrew Palfrey (AUS); Ruairidh Scott (GBR) | POL 17 - Aspire; Przemysław Gacek (POL); Mateusz Kusznierewicz (POL); Killian Weise (GER) | AUS 66 - Ku-Ring-Gai 3 John Bacon (AUS); Joost Houwling (NED); Ed Wright (GBR) | |
| 2026 Athens; 19 Boats | POL 17 - Aspire; Przemysław Gacek (POL); Mateusz Kusznierewicz (POL); Killian Weise (GER) | NOR 57(c) - Artemis; Kristoffer Spone (NOR); Trond Solli Sæther (NOR); Anders Pedersen (SWE) | AUS 66 - Ku-Ring-Gai 3 Jay Cross (USA); Rob Scrivenor (AUS); Andrew Palfrey (AUS) | |

== See also ==
- World championships in sailing
- World Sailing
