= List of Tempest (keelboat) Championships =

This is a list of Tempest sailboat championships.

== Olympics ==
Event	Gold	Silver	Bronze
1972 Kiel	Soviet Union (URS); Valentin Mankin; Vitali Dyrdyra	Great Britain (GBR); Alan Warren; David Hunt	United States (USA); Glen Foster; Peter Dean
1976 Montreal	Sweden (SWE); John Albrechtson; Ingvar Hansson	Soviet Union (URS); Valentin Mankin; Vladyslav Akimenko	United States (USA); Dennis Conner; Conn Findlay

== European Championships ==
European championships were only held when a World Championship was held outside the European continent. After 1980 no further European championships were held.

Event	Gold	Silver	Bronze
1966 Burnham-on-Crouch	United Kingdom (K); Keith Musto; Ian Winter		
1968 Alassio	Italy (I); Carlo Massone; Favio Risso		
1969 Kiel	United Kingdom (K); Cliff Norbury; Colin Turner		
1972 La Rochelle	Netherlands (H); Ben Staartjes; Cees Kurpershoek	Poland (PL); Tomasz Holc; Rutkowski	Soviet Union (SR); Valentin Mankin; Vitaly Dyrdyra
1975 Brunnen	West Germany (G); Uwe Mares; Franz Wehofisch	Italy (I); Dotti; Girardi	Switzerland (Z); Kohler; Frey
1976 Alassio	Sweden (S); John Albrechtson; Ingvar Hansson		
1977 Strömstad	Sweden (S); John Albrechtson; Ingvar Hansson		
1978 Kiel	Sweden (S); John Albrechtson; Ingvar Hansson	Austria (S); Oskar Bilik, Jr. Josef Essl	West Germany (G); Twelkmeyer
1979 Attersee	Austria (OE); Oskar Bilik, Jr. Josef Essl		
