= Sailing at the 1972 Summer Olympics – Tempest =

Tempest at the Games of the XX Olympiad
- Line drawing of the Tempest
- Venue: Kiel-Schilksee (Olympiazentrum)
- Dates: First race: 29 August 1972; Last race: 8 September 1972
- Competitors: 42 from 21 nations
- Teams: 21

Medalists
1st place, gold medalist(s)		Valentyn Mankin; Vitaliy Dyrdyra	Soviet Union
2nd place, silver medalist(s)		Alan Warren; David Hunt	Great Britain
3rd place, bronze medalist(s)		Glen Foster; Peter Dean	United States

The Tempest was a sailing event on the Sailing at the 1972 Summer Olympics program in Kiel-Schilksee. Seven races were scheduled and completed. 42 sailors, on 21 boats, from 21 nation competed.

== Race schedule ==
Due to the interruption of the games on 6 September 1972, the race was postponed till 7 September. Then the race conditions were unsuitable. Heavy fog and poor wind conditions made it not possible to race until 8 September. Also the medal ceremony was also postponed until 8 September.

●	Event competitions	●	Event finals

Date	August						September										
Date	26th Sat	27th Sun	28th Mon	29th Tue	30th Wed	31st Thu	1st Fri	2nd Sat	3rd Sun	4th Mon	5th Tue	6th Wed	7th Thu	8th Fri	9th Sat	10th Sun	11th Mon
Tempest (planning)				●	●	●	●	Spare day	Spare day	●	●	●	Spare day	Spare day			
Tempest (actual)				●	●	●	●	Spare day	Spare day	●	●		Fog	●			

== Course area and course configuration ==
For the Tempest course area B(ravo) was used. The location (54°30'30'’N, 10°13'00'’E) points to the center of the 2 nm radius circle. The distance between mark 1 and 3 was about 2nm.

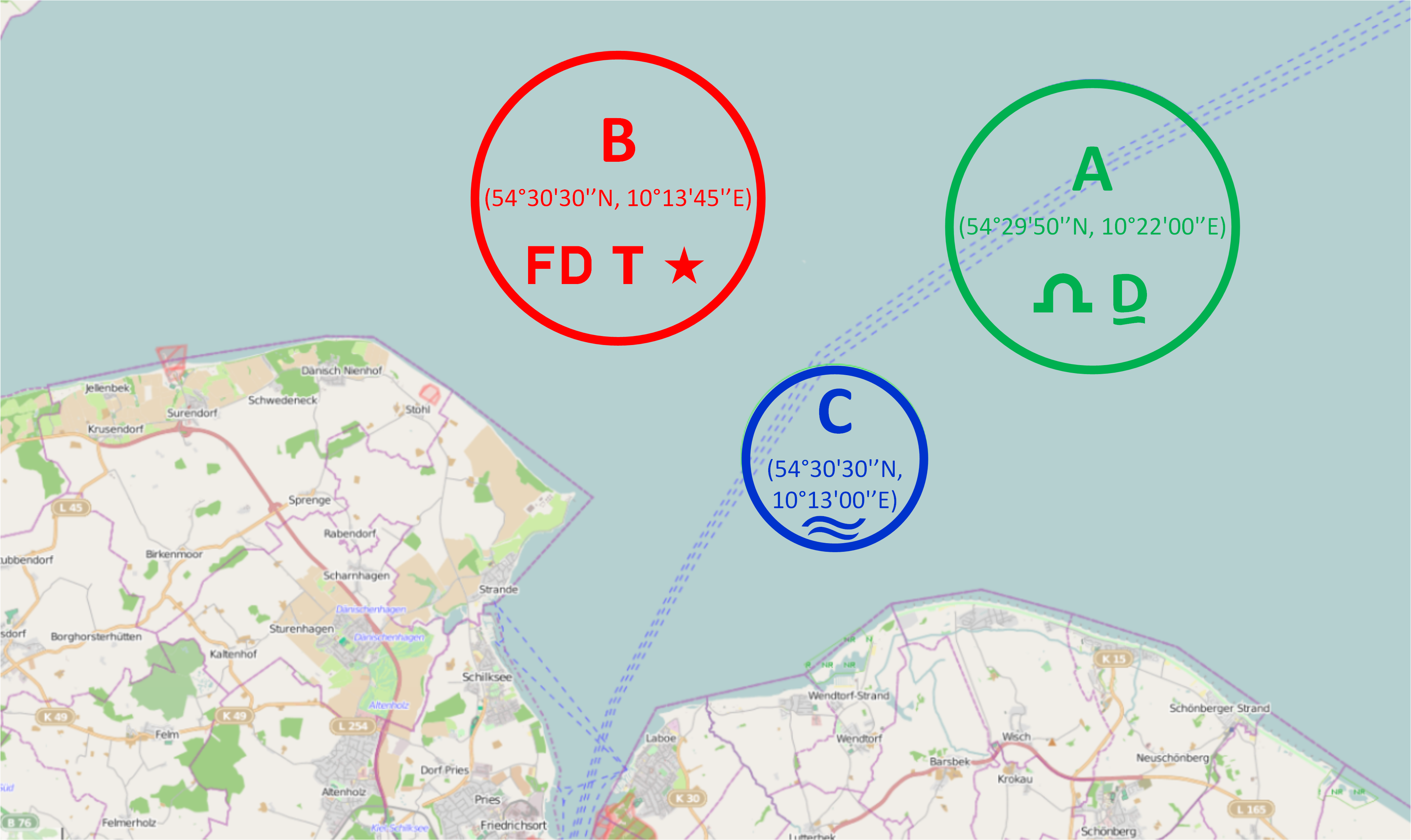

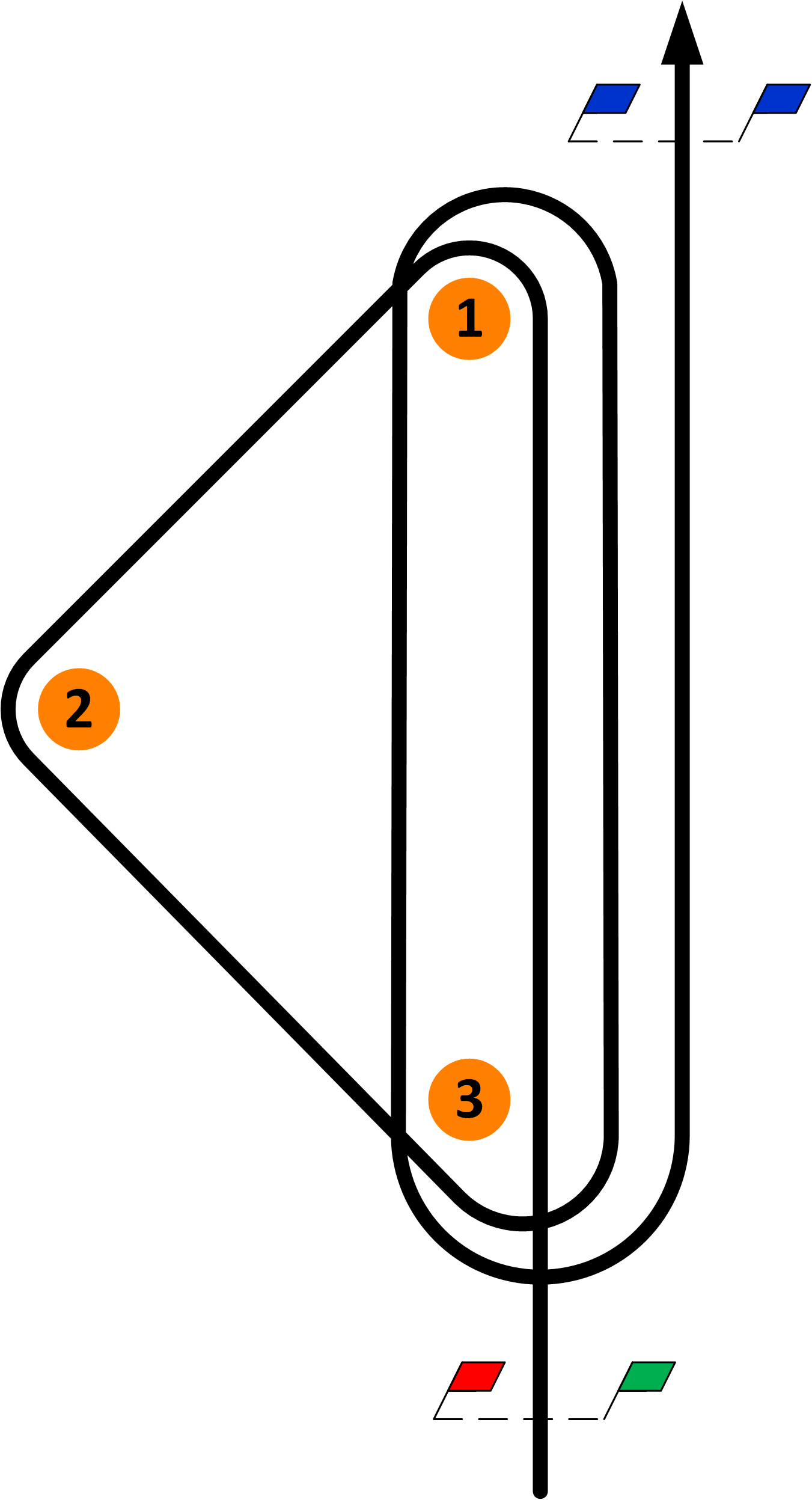

== Final results ==
These are the results of the Tempest event.

Rank	Country	Helmsman	Crew	Race 1		Race 2		Race 3		Race 4		Race 5		Race 6		Race 7		Total	Total – discard
Rank	Country	Helmsman	Crew	Pos.	Pts.	Pos.	Pts.	Pos.	Pts.	Pos.	Pts.	Pos.	Pts.	Pos.	Pts.	Pos.	Pts.	Total	Total – discard
1st place, gold medalist(s)	Soviet Union	Valentin Mankin	Vitalii Dyrdyra	3	5.7	4	8.0	1	0.0	3	5.7	~~8~~	~~14.0~~	2	3.0	3	5.7	42.1	28.1
2nd place, silver medalist(s)	Great Britain	Alan Warren	David Hunt	4	8.0	1	0.0	2	3.0	1	0.0	6	11.7	6	11.7	~~8~~	~~14.0~~	48.4	34.4
3rd place, bronze medalist(s)	United States	Glen Foster	Peter Dean	8	14.0	~~DSQ~~	~~30.0~~	3	5.7	2	3.0	4	8.0	8	14.0	2	3.0	77.7	47.7
4	Sweden	John Albrechtson	Ingvar Hansson	2	3.0	7	13.0	8	14.0	5	10.0	~~11~~	~~17.0~~	3	5.7	6	11.7	75.4	57.4
5	Netherlands	Ben Staartjes	Cees Kurpershoek	7	13.0	2	3.0	6	11.7	9	15.0	10	16.0	~~17~~	~~23.0~~	1	0.0	81.7	58.7
6	Norway	Peder Lunde Jr	Aksel Gresvig	~~16~~	~~22.0~~	9	15.0	4	8.0	8	14.0	2	3.0	7	13.0	11	17.0	92.0	70.0
7	Brazil	Mario Buckup	Peter Ficker	~~19~~	~~25.0~~	3	5.7	7	13.0	7	13.0	16	22.0	5	10.0	5	10.0	98.7	73.7
8	Ireland	David Wilkins	Sean Whitaker	6	11.7	8	14.0	9	15.0	~~13~~	~~19.0~~	1	0.0	13	19.0	9	15.0	93.7	74.7
9	France	Marcel Troupel	Yves Devillers	1	0.0	10	16.0	11	17.0	11	17.0	5	10.0	~~19~~	~~25.0~~	12	18.0	103.0	78.0
10	Austria	Hubert Raudaschl	Erich Moritz	5	10.0	6	11.7	13	19.0	~~15~~	~~22.0~~	3	5.7	12	18.0	14	20.0	106.4	84.4
11	West Germany	Heinz Laprell	Wolf Stadler	9	15.0	~~19~~	~~25.0~~	5	10.0	4	8.0	19	25.0	11	17.0	7	13.0	113.0	88.0
12	Poland	Tomasz Holc	Roman Rutkowski	10	16.0	14	20.0	~~16~~	~~22.0~~	6	11.7	15	21.0	4	8.0	13	19.0	117.7	95.7
13	Switzerland	Urs Kohler	Peter Frey	~~18~~	~~24.0~~	12	18.0	12	18.0	18	24.0	17	23.0	1	0.0	10	16.0	123.0	99.0
14	Italy	Giampiero Dotti	Francesco Sibello	12	18.0	18	24.0	10	16.0	~~19~~	~~25.0~~	13	19.0	16	22.0	4	8.0	132.0	107.0
15	Canada	Ted Hains	Larry Scott	17	23.0	5	10.0	~~18~~	~~24.0~~	14	20.0	18	24.0	10	16.0	15	21.0	138.0	114.0
16	Puerto Rico	John Garry Hoyt	Hovey T. Freeman	13	19.0	16	22.0	14	20.0	10	16.0	7	13.0	~~DSQ~~	~~30.0~~	18	24.0	144.0	114.0
17	Denmark	Mogens Larsen	Klaus Føge Jensen	11	17.0	13	19.0	20	26.0	12	18.0	14	20.0	15	21.0	~~DSQ~~	~~28.0~~	149.0	121.0
18	Hong Kong	Kenneth Tomlins	Gilbert Lennox-King	15	21.0	11	17.0	15	21.0	~~21~~	~~27.0~~	20	26.0	9	15.0	19	25.0	152.0	125.0
19	Australia	Gordon Ingate	Robert Thornton	14	20.0	15	21.0	17	23.0	17	23.0	12	18.0	~~DNF~~	~~27.0~~	17	23.0	155.0	128.0
20	Virgin Islands	John Foster sr.	John Hamber	~~20~~	~~26.0~~	17	23.0	19	25.0	16	22.0	9	15.0	18	24.0	16	22.0	157.0	131.0
21	Thailand	Prinz Bira Bhanubanda	Paitoon Chulatuppa	21	27.0	20	26.0	21	27.0	20	26.0	21	27.0	14	20.0	~~DNS~~	~~27.0~~	180.0	153.0

Legend: DSQ – Disqualified;
Discard is crossed out and does not count for the overall result.
Gender: – male; – female;

== Daily standings ==
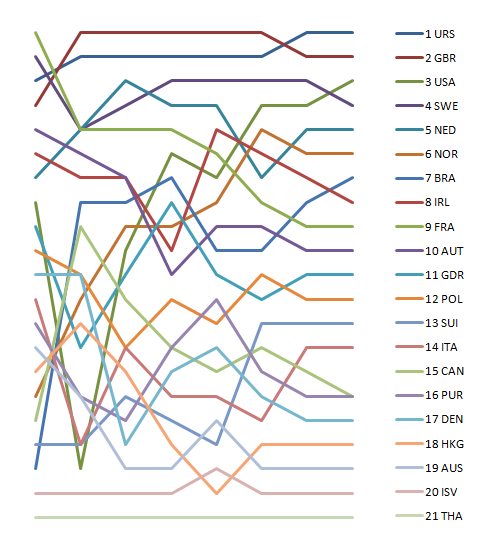
Graph showing the daily standings in the Tempest during the 1972 Summer Olympics
