= Tempest World Championship =

Annual international sailing regatta

The Tempest World Championship is an annual international sailing regatta for Tempest (keelboat)s, organized by the host club on behalf of the International Tempest Class Association and recognized by World Sailing, the sports IOC recognized governing body.

== Editions ==
Ed.	Date		Location			Boat				Sailor			Ref.
Ed.	Day/Month	Year	Host club	City	Country	Boats	M	F	Mix	Comp.	Nat.	Cont.	Ref.
1	-	1967		Weymouth, Dorset	United Kingdom								
2	-	1968		Grosse Pointe (MI)	United States								
3	-	1969		Riva del Garda	Italy								
4	-	1970		Quiberon	France								
5	-	1971		Marstrand	Sweden								
	-	1972	No world championship (Olympic Year)										
6	-	1973		Neapel	Italy								
7	-	1974		Medemblik	Netherlands								
8	-	1975		Association Island (NY)	United States								
		1976	No world championship (Olympic Year)										
9	-	1977		Strömstad	Sweden								
10	-	1978		Castelletto	Italy								
11	-	1979	Hayling Island Sailing Club	Hayling Island	United Kingdom								
12	-	1980		Medemblik	Netherlands								
NOT HELD		1981											
13	-	1982		Seebruck	Germany								
14	-	1983		Weymouth, Dorset	United Kingdom								
15	-	1984		Portorož	Slovenia (former Yugoslavia)								
16	-	1985		Medemblik	Netherlands								
17	-	1986		St. Gilgen	Austria								
18	-	1987		Portorož	Slovenia								
19	-	1988		Spiez	Switzerland								
20	-	1989		Malcesine/Navene	Italy								
21	-	1990		Medemblik	Netherlands								
22	-	1991		St. Gilgen	Austria								
23	-	1992		Balatonfüred	Hungary								
24	-	1993		Warnemünde	Germany								
25	-	1994	Warnemunder Segel-Club	Brunnen	Switzerland								
26	-	1995		Medemblik	Netherlands								
27	11 - 18 May	1996	Kartner Yacht Club	Lake Ossiachersee	Austria								
28	-	1997		Hartlepool	United Kingdom								
29	-	1998		Malcesine/Navene	Italy								
30	28 Aug to 4 Sept	1999	Club Nautique de Saint Raphaël	Saint-Raphaël	France								
31	-	2000		Travemünde	Germany								
32	-	2001		Malcesine/Navene	Italy								
33	22 - 27 July	2002		Brighton	United Kingdom								
34	6 - 14 Sept	2003	Cercle de La Voile de Grandson	Grandson	Switzerland								
35	23 - 28 Aug	2004	Société des Régates Rochelaises	La Rochelle	France								
36	10 - 17 Sept	2005	Segelclub Kammersee	Attersee	Austria								
37	27 Oct to 2 Nov	2006		Fort-de-France (Martinique)	France	27				54	4	1	
38	7 - 14 July	2007	Warnemunder Segel-Club	Warnemünde	Germany	40				80	6	1	
39	16 - 22 Aug	2008	Weymouth and Portland National Sailing Academy	Isle of Portland	United Kingdom	32				64	6	1	
40	15 - 22 Aug	2009	Yacht Club Spiez	Thunersee	Switzerland	62				124	6	1	
41	20 - 28 Aug	2010	Watersportvereniging Horn	Hoorn	Netherlands	34				68	6	1	
42	28 May to 5 June	2011	Segelclub Ebensee	Traunsee	Austria	43				86	7	1	
43	20 - 26 Aug	2012	S R ST PIERRE QUIBERON	Quiberon	France	34				68	8	1	
44	19 - 28 July	2013	Travemünder Woche	Lübeck	Germany	24				48	5	1	
45	30 Aug to 5 Sept	2014	CVCD	Domaso/Lake Como	Italy	31				62	7	1	
46	22 - 28 Aug	2015	Yacht Club of Brunnen	Brunnen/Lake Lucerne	Switzerland	38				76	5	1	
47	9 - 15 July	2016	Cowes Classic Week	Cowes	United Kingdom	23				46	5	1	
48	26 Aug to 3 Sept	2017	Club Nautique de Saint Raphaël	Saint-Raphaël	France	335				70	6	2	
49	30 June to 6 July	2018		Attersee	Austria	41				82	6	2	
50	10 - 16 Aug	2019	Tergernsee YCaT	Tegernsee	Germany	43	36	0	7	86	7	3	
	-	2020		Torbole	Italy	(CANCELLED COVID)							
51	3 - 9 July	2021		Torbole	Italy	27	22	0	5	54	4	1	
52	17 - 21 Aug	2022	Kieler Yacht Club	Schilksee		33	28	0	5	66	6	2	
53	19 - 25 Aug	2023	Portsmouth Sailing Club / Hornet Services Sailing Club	Portsmouth	United Kingdom	26	20	0	6	52	6	2	
54	31Aug -6Sep	2024	Regattaverein Brunnen	Brunnen	Switzerland	36	30	0	6	72	6	2	
55	23 Aug	2025	Watersportvereniging Hoorn	Hoorn	Netherlands	26	19	0	7	52	6	2	
56	Oct	2026	Yacht Club de Cannes	Cannes	France	38	31	0	7	76	7	2	

== Multiple World Champions ==
Ranking	Sailor	Gold	Silver	Bronze	Total	No. Entries	Ref.
1	Christian Schäfer (GER)	10	2	3	15	16	
2	Andreas Mader (GER)	7	1	3	11	13	
3	Max Reichert Jnr. (GER)	6	2	7	15	26	
4]	Klaus Rösch (GER)	6	2	6	14	16	
5	Rolf Bähr (GER)	5	5	4	14	18	
6	Christian Rusitschka (GER)	5	3	3	11	18	
7	Philippe Boite (FRA)	4	3	0	7	11	
8	Frank Weigelt (GER)	4	2	3	9	11	
9	Thomas Auracher (GER)	4	0	0	4	4	
10	Régis Viateur (FRA)	3	3	0	6	7	
11	Cornelia Christen (SUI)	3	1	3	7	10	
11	Ruedi Christen (SUI)	3	1	3	7	10	
13	Lars Bähr (GER)	3	2	0	5	5	
13	Leif Bähr (GER)	3	2	0	5	5	
15	Wolfgang Nothegger (GER)	3	0	1	4	4	
16	Markus Wieser (GER)	3	0	0	3	3	
17	Mike Knobloch (GER)	2	1	0	3	6	
17	John Albrechtson (SWE)	2	1	0	3	3	
17	Ingvar Hansson (SWE)	2	1	0	3	3	
20	Sepp Hoss (GER)	2	0	0	2	11	
20	Dieter Klarmann (GER)	2	0	0	2	5	
20	Cliff Norbury (GBR)	2	0	0	2	4	
20	Colin Turner (GBR)	2	0	0	2	4	
20	Jurgen Knuth (GER)	2	0	0	2	3	

== Medalist ==
Games	Gold	Silver	Bronze	Ref.
1967	K 30 - Tangerine; Cliff Norbury (GBR); Colin Turner (GBR) K 27 - Zanda; Reg White (GBR); Andrew Garran (GBR)	N/A	KA 1 - Cleopatra; J. HARDYAUS (AUS); M. WHITNALL (AUS)	
1968	USA 189 - Dawry; William Kelly (USA); Robert Connell (USA)	US 28 - Flying Saucer; A. Kostanecki (USA); B. Biddle (USA)	US 49 - Ralph; C. Ulmer Jnr. (USA); P. Clempner (USA)	
1969	K 50 - Tambourine; Cliff Norbury (GBR); Colin Turner (GBR)	P 51 - Sharacapete; T.Holc (POL); R.Rutkowski (POL)	F 11 - Snoopy Too; J-P. Marang (FRA); L.Ces (FRA)	
1970	US 191- Beast; John Linville (USA); James Linville (USA)	H 2 - Double Dutch; Ben Staartjes (NED); Cees Kurpershoek (NED)	US 26 - Daedalus; D.B. Falconer (USA); Bruce Dyson (USA)	
1971	United States; Glen Foster; Peter Dean			
1972	not held because of the 1972 Summer Olympics			
1973	Soviet Union; Valentin Mankin; Vladimir Akimenko	Italy; Dotti; Sibello	United States; Dyson; Lindsay	
1974	West Germany; Uwe Mares; Franz Wehofisch	West Germany; Krick; Heldt	West Germany; Mebel; Lohmann	
1975	Italy; Giuseppe Milone; Roberto Mottola	Sweden; John Albrechtson; Ingvar Hansson	West Germany; Uwe Mares; Franz Wehofisch	
1976	not held because of the 1976 Summer Olympics			
1977	Sweden; John Albrechtson; Ingvar Hansson	West Germany; Höss	West Germany; Greve	
1978	Sweden; John Albrechtson; Ingvar Hansson	West Germany; Twelkmeyer; Schumacher	West Germany; Rolf Bähr; Wolfgang Nothegger	
1979	West Germany; Rolf Bähr; Wolf Stadler	Austria; Oskar Billik Jr; Josef Essl	Great Britain; Moncur; Lowther	
1980	West Germany; Rolf Bähr; Michael Beckereit	Austria; Haas; Jörg	West Germany; Greve; Pildner	
1981	no championship			
1982	West Germany; Rolf Bähr; Wolfgang Nothegger	West Germany; Klaus Rösch; Max Reichert Jr	West Germany; Sepp Höss; Dieter Klarmann	
1983	West Germany; Sepp Höss; Dieter Klarmann	West Germany; Klaus Rösch; Max Reichert Jr	West Germany; Rolf Bähr; Wolfgang Nothegger	
1984	West Germany; Sepp Höss; Dieter Klarmann	West Germany; Klaus Rösch; Max Reichert Jr	West Germany; Rolf Bähr; Wolfgang Nothegge	
1985	West Germany; Rolf Bähr; Wolfgang Nothegger			
1986	West Germany; Klaus Rösch; Max Reichert Jr	West Germany; Rolf Bähr; Wolfgang Nothegger	UNKNOWN	
1987	West Germany; Rolf Bähr; Wolfgang Nothegger	West Germany; Klaus Rösch; Max Reichert Jr	West Germany; Sepp Höss; Dieter Klrmann	
1988	West Germany; Klaus Rösch; Max Reichert Jr	UNKNOWN	UNKNOWN	
1989	West Germany; Klaus Rösch; Max Reichert Jr	UNKNOWN	UNKNOWN	
1990	West Germany; Klaus Rösch; Max Reichert Jr	UNKNOWN	UNKNOWN	
1991	Germany; Klaus Rösch; Max Reichert Jr	UNKNOWN	UNKNOWN	
1992	Christian Schäfer (GER); Herbert Kujan (GER)	UNKNOWN	UNKNOWN	
1993	Germany; Vincent Hösch; Thomas Auracher	Germany; Christian Schäfer; Herbert Kujan	Germany; Klaus Rösch; Max Reichert Jr	
1994	GER 231; Klaus Rösch (GER); Max Reichert Jr (GER)	GBR 96; GILES (GBR); ROBSON (GBR)	GER 224; Christian Schäfer (GER); Andreas Mader (GER)	
1995	Christian Schäfer (GER); Andreas Mader (GER)	Ringmeier (GER); Mike Knobloch (GER)	Klaus Rösch (GER); Max Reichert Jr (GER)	
1996	Christian Schäfer (GER); Andreas Mader (GER)	Andreas Polterauer (GER); UNKNOWN	Christian Braune (GER); UNKNOWN	
1997	Jürgen Knuth (GER); Mike Knobloch (GER)	Christian Schäfer (GER); Andreas Mader (GER)	Klaus Rösch (GER); Max Reichert Jr (GER)	
1998	Jürgen Knuth (GER); Mike Knobloch (GER)	Klaus Rösch (GER); Max Reichert Jr (GER)	Werner Meier (SUI); Christian Spranger (SUI)	
1999	SUI 1119; Werner Meier (SUI); Christian Spranger (SUI)	GER 241; Klaus Rösch (GER); Max Reichert Jr (GER)	GER 248; Germany; Rolf Bähr; Thomas Olbrich	
2000	GER 1135; Germany; Christian Schäfer; Andreas Mader	GER 248; Germany; Rolf Bähr; Thomas Olbrich	GER 1141; Germany; Klaus Rösch; Max Reichert Jr	
2001	GER 1139 - Sam VI; Germany; Christian Schäfer; Andreas Mader	SUI 1119 - Schnapsi; Switzerland; Werner Meier; Alfred Geisser	GER 1141 - Ramadama; Germany; Klaus Rösch; Max Reichert Jr	
2002	GER 1139; Germany; Christian Schäfer; Andreas Mader	GER 248; Germany; Rolf Bähr; Thomas Olbrich	GER 1141; Germany; Klaus Rösch; Max Reichert Jr	
2003	1147 - Sam VII; Germany; Christian Schäfer; Andreas Mader	248 - Do-toho; Germany; Rolf Bähr; Thomas Olbrich	SUI 1137 - Dragonera III; Switzerland; Pierre Mäder; Andreas Dietrich	
2004	GRODOUDOU; France; Philippe Boite; Fabrice Toupet	DO TO-HO; Germany; Rolf Bähr; Thomas Olbrich	SAM VIII; Germany; Christian Schäfer; Andreas Mader	
2005	Germany; Christian Schäfer; Frank Weigelt	France; Philippe Boite; Fabrice Toupet	Germany; Rolf Bähr; Christian Spranger	
2006	SUPER DOUDOU; France; Philippe Boite; Regis Viateur	FOCA; Switzerland; Mario Suter; Christophe Müri	FEVER UND EI; Germany; Gerhard Albrecht; Hansjörg Schäfer	
2007	FRA 1182 - GROS DOUDOU; Philippe Boite (FRA); Regis Viateur (FRA)	GER 1087; Frank Weigelt (GER); Christian Rusitschka (GER)	GER 1128 - dotoho Rolf Bähr (GER); Thomas Olbrich (GER)	
2008	GER 1087; Frank Weigelt (GER); Christian Rusitschka (GER)	FRA 1182; Philippe Boite (FRA); Regis Viateur (FRA)	GER 1187; Christian Schäfer (GER); Andreas Mader (GER)	
2009	FRA 1182; France; Phillipe Boite; Regis Viateur	SUI 999; Switzerland; Stephan Fels; Timo Näf	GER 1087; Germany; Frank Weigelt; Christian Rusitschka	
2010	GER 1087 - Holzwurm; Frank Weigelt (GER); Christian Rusitschka (GER)	FRA 1182 - Superdoudou; Philippe Boite (FRA); Regis Viateur (FRA)	GER 1088 - Baehrenmarke; Bertold Beahr (GER); Andreas Greif (GER)	
2011	GER 1187; Christian Schäfer (GER); Christian Rusitschka (GER)	GER 1128; Rolf Bähr (GER); Christian Spranger (GER)	SUI 1136; Marior Suter (SUI); Andreas Hochuli (SUI)	
2012	GER 1087 - HW; Christian Schäfer (GER); Christian Rusitschka (GER)	FRA 1182 - SUPER DOUDOU; Gerard AUMONT (FRA); Regis VIATEUR (FRA)	SUI 1122 - PULCE D'ACQUA; Cornelia Christen (SUI); Ruedi Christen (SUI)	
2013	GER 1142; Frank Weigelt (GER); Arne Lanatowitz	SUI 1122; Cornelia Christen (SUI); Ruedi Christen (SUI)	GER 1149; Germany; Stefan Erlacher; Christian Wöhrer	
2014	SUI 1122; Cornelia Christen (SUI); Ruedi Christen (SUI)	GER 1087; Andreas Plettner (GER); Christian Rusitschka (GER)	GER 1183; Klaus Wende (GER); Max Reichert Jnr. (GER)	
2015	SUI 1122; Cornelia Christen (SUI); Ruedi Christen (SUI)	GER 1128; Christian Spranger (GER); Christopher Kopp (GER)	GER 1187; Herbert Kujan (GER); Christian Kujan (GER)	
2016	GER 1087 Holzwurm; Frank Weigelt (GER); Christian Rusitschka (GER)	GER 1128 do-to-ho Christian Spranger (GER); Christopher Kopp (GER)	SUI 1122; Cornelia Christen (SUI); Ruedi Christen (SUI)	
2017	SUI 1122 pulce d'acqua Cornelia Christen (SUI); Ruedi Christen (SUI)	GER 1128 do to ho Christian Spranger (GER); Christopher Kopp (GER)	GER 1087 Holzwurm; Frank Weigelt (GER); Christian Rusitschka (GER)	
2018	GER 1194; Christian Spranger (GER); Christopher Kopp (GER)	GER 1087; Frank Weigelt (GER); Christian Rusitschka (GER)	SUI 1122; Cornelia Christen (SUI); Ruedi Christen (SUI)	
2019	GER 1196; Markus Wieser (GER); Thomas Auracher (GER)	GER 1187; Werner FRITZ; Herbert KUJAN	GER 1192; Stafan SCHOLLMAYER; Markus MUHLBAUER	
2020	CANCELLED DUE COVID-19			
2021	GER 1196- Wosamma; Markus Wieser (GER); Thomas Auracher (GER)	GER 1194- Do to Ho 2 Christian Spranger (GER); Christopher Kopp (GER)	GER 1197; Kicker Schafer (GER); Gusti Trimpl (GER)	
2022	GER 1196; Markus Wieser (GER); Thomas Auracher (GER)	GER 1128; Lars Bähr (GER); Leif Bähr (GER)	GER 1194; Christian Spranger (GER); Christopher Kopp (GER)	
2023	GER 1128- do-to-ho Lars Bahr (GER); Leif Bahr (GER)	GER 1197; Kicker Schäfer (GER); Gusti Trimpl (GER)	GER 1196- Wosamma; Stefan Durach (GER); Christopher Kopp (GER)	
2024	GER 1128; Lars Bähr (GER); Leif Bähr (GER)	GER 1194; Christian Spranger (GER); Christopher Kopp (GER)	SUI 1159; Eric Monnin (SUI); Ute Monnin-Wagner (SUI)	
2025	GER 1128; Lars Bähr (GER); Leif Bähr (GER)	GER 1190; Tobias Spranger (GER); Gusti Trimpl (GER)	GER 1087; Frank Weigelt (GER); Christian Rusitschka (GER)	
2026	GER 1190; Tobias Spranger (GER); Felix Meggendorfer (GER)	GER 1128; Lars Bähr (GER); Leif Bähr (GER)	GER 1200; Kicker Schäfer (GER); Gusti Trimpl (GER)	
