= Hong Kong at the 1972 Summer Olympics =

- IOC code: HKG
- NOC: Sports Federation and Olympic Committee of Hong Kong

in Munich
- Competitors: 10 in 5 sports
- Flag bearer: Peter Rull Sr
- Officials: ?
- Medals: Gold 0 Silver 0 Bronze 0 Total 0

Summer Olympics appearances (overview)
- 1952; 1956; 1960; 1964; 1968; 1972; 1976; 1980; 1984; 1988; 1992; 1996; 2000; 2004; 2008; 2012; 2016; 2020; 2024

Hong Kong competed at the 1972 Summer Olympics in Munich, West Germany. Ten competitors, all men, took part in 13 events in 5 sports.

- Matthew Chan Wan Hei - Fencing
- Mark Anthony Crocker - Swimming
- Robert Elliot - Fencing
- Gilbert Lennox-King - sailing
- Mok Cheuk Wing - judo
- Peter Rull, Sr. (Estonia) - Shooting
- Wong Man Chiu "Ronnie" - Swimming
- Colin Smith - sailing
- Bill Steele - sailing
- Kenneth Tomlins - sailing

== Fencing ==
Two fencers represented Hong Kong in 1972.

Men's foil

- Chan Wan Hei
- Robert Elliott

Men's épée

- Chan Wan Hei
- Robert Elliott

Men's sabre

- Chan Wan Hei
- Robert Elliott

== Judo ==
- Mok Cheuk Wing - Men's 70 kg

== Sailing ==
- Colin Smith & Bill Steele - Flying Dutchman
- Kenneth Tomlins & Gilbert Lennox-King - Tempest

== Shooting ==
One shooter represented Hong Kong in 1972.

50 m rifle, prone

- Peter Rull, Sr.

== Swimming ==
Men's 100m Freestyle

- Ronnie Man Chiu Wong

- Heat — 57.53s (→ did not advance)

Men's 200m Freestyle

- Mark Anthony Crocker

- Heat — 2:12.85 (→ did not advance)
