= Sundelin =

Sundelin is a Swedish surname that may refer to:

- Jörgen Sundelin (born 1945), Swedish Olympic sailor
- Matti Sundelin (1934–2025), Finnish football player
- Peter Sundelin (born 1947), Swedish Olympic sailor, brother of Ulf and Peter
- Stefan Sundelin (1936–2003), Swedish Olympic sailor, cousin of Jörgen, Peter and Ulf
- Ulf Sundelin (born 1943), Swedish Olympic sailor, brother of Jörgen and Peter
