= Stefan Sundelin =

Swedish sailor

Personal information
- Full name: Lars Stefan Sundelin
- Born: 8 February 1936 Stockholm, Sweden
- Died: 18 January 2003 (aged 66) Stockholm, Sweden
- Height: 182 cm (6 ft 0 in)
- Weight: 78 kg (172 lb)

Sport
- Sport: Sailboat racing
- Club: Royal Swedish Yacht Club

Lars Stefan Sundelin (8 February 1936 – 18 January 2003) was a Swedish sailor. He was a cousin of the brothers Jörgen, Peter and Ulf Sundelin who competed as a team at the 1968 and 1972 Olympics and at the world championships in between. At the 1976 Summer Olympics Ulf was replaced by Stefan, and the Sundelin team finished ninth in the three-person keelboat event.
