= Aksel Gresvig (sailor) =

Norwegian sailor

Personal information
- Full name: Aksel Hroar Gresvig
- Nationality: Norwegian
- Born: 21 November 1941 (age 84) Oslo, Norway
- Height: 198 cm (6 ft 6 in)
- Weight: 98 kg (216 lb)

Sailing career
- Sport: Sailing
- Club: Royal Norwegian Yacht Club
- Class: Tempest

Aksel Hroar Gresvig (born 21 November 1941) is a Norwegian competitive sailor. He was born in Oslo. He competed at the 1972 Summer Olympics in Munich, in the Tempest class.
