= Larry Scott =

Larry Scott may refer to:

- Larry Scott (bodybuilder) (1938–2014), American professional bodybuilder
- Larry Scott (radio personality) (1938–2016), American country music disc jockey
- Larry Scott (sailor) (born 1947), Canadian Olympic sailor
- Larry Scott (sports administrator) (born 1964), American sports administrator and former professional tennis player
- Larry Scott (American football) (born 1977), American football coach
- Larry B. Scott (born 1961), American actor
- Larry R. Scott (born 1952), American businessman and member of the New Mexico House of Representatives

== See also ==
- Lawrence Scott (disambiguation)
- Laurie Scott (disambiguation)
