= Peter Frey =

Peter Frey may refer to:

- Peter Frey (journalist) (born 1957), German journalist
- Peter Frey (sailor) (born 1949), Swiss sailor
