= Symonette =

Symonette is a surname. Notable people with the surname include:

- Brent Symonette (born 1954), Bahamian businessman
- Craig Symonette (born 1951), Bahamian sailor
- Georgianna Kathleen Symonette (1902–1965), Bahamian suffragist
- Josh Symonette (born 1978), American football player
- Robert Symonette (1925–1998), Bahamian sailor, businessman and politician
- Roland Theodore Symonette (1898–1980), Bahamian politician
- Vernon Symonette (1937-2022), Bahamian politician
