= Johan Barne =

Swedish sailor

Personal information
- Full name: Johan Mats Rikard Barne
- Born: 4 April 1964 (age 62) Gothenburg, Sweden

Sailing career
- Sport: Sailing
- Club: Royal Gothenburg Yacht Club
Medal record
Sailing
Representing Sweden
World Championships
Gold medal – first place	1996 Cádiz	Soling match
Gold medal – first place	1999 Melbourne	Soling match
Gold medal – first place	2009 Hankø	5.5 Metre
Gold medal – first place	2009 Palma de Mallorca	TP 52
Gold medal – first place	2012 Boltenhagen	5.5 Metre
Gold medal – first place	2015 Nynäshamn	5.5 Metre
Gold medal – first place	2016 Copenhagen	5.5 Metre
Gold medal – first place	2017 Scarlino	TP 52
Gold medal – first place	2019 Helsinki	5.5 Metre
Gold medal – first place	2020 Pittwater	5.5 Metre
Gold medal – first place	2024 Porquerolles	12 Metre
Silver medal – second place	1995 Kingston, Ontario	Soling fleet
Silver medal – second place	2003 Malmö	505
Silver medal – second place	2010 Tallinn	Melges 24
Silver medal – second place	2013 Curaçao	5.5 Metre
Silver medal – second place	2014 Porto Santo Stefano	5.5 Metre
Silver medal – second place	2015 Mallorca	TP 52
Silver medal – second place	2023 Porto Cervo	5.5 Metre
Silver medal – second place	2024 Benodet	5.5 Metre
Silver medal – second place	2026 Porto Cervo	TP 52
Bronze medal – third place	1992 Cádiz	Soling fleet
Bronze medal – third place	2000 Murcia	Soling fleet
Bronze medal – third place	2024 Hankø	Soling fleet
Bronze medal – third place	2022 Hankø	5.5 Metre
European Championships
Gold medal – first place	2023 Warnemünde	Soling fleet
Gold medal – first place	2024 La Baule	Soling fleet
Silver medal – second place	1991 La Baule	Soling fleet
Silver medal – second place	2024 Mariehamn	ORCi
Silver medal – second place	2025 Lake Como	Soling fleet
52 Super Series
Silver medal – second place	2017	TP52
Silver medal – second place	2018	TP52

Johan Mats Rikard Barne (born 4 April 1964 in Gothenburg) is a Swedish Olympic sailor in the Soling class. Barne competed in 1992, 1996 and 2000 Summer Olympics, finishing fifth in the Soling in the 1992 edition, 13th in 1996 and 7th in 2000.

He has received the honorary award ”Sailor of the Year” from the Swedish Sailing Federation six times, more than any other sailor.
