= Mark Covell =

Scottish sailor

Medal record

Sailing

Representing Great Britain

Olympic Games
Silver medal – second place	2000 Sydney	Star

Representing Great Britain

5.5 Metre World Championship
Gold medal – first place	2003 Bénodet	5.5m
Gold medal – first place	1997	5.5m
Gold medal – first place	1997	Etchells

Mark Covell (born 7 November 1967 in Glasgow) is a Scottish competitive sailor and Olympic medalist. He won a silver medal in the Star class at the 2000 Summer Olympics in Sydney, along with Ian Walker.

He sailed with Team Russia as their media crew member for the 2008–09 Volvo Ocean Race.
