= Andrew Palfrey =

Australian sailor (born 1967)

Personal information
- Nickname: Dog
- Born: 26 January 1967 (age 59) Melbourne, Victoria, Australia
- Height: 1.93 m (6 ft 4 in)
- Weight: 96 kg (212 lb)

Sailing career
- Sport: Sailing
- Club: Royal Prince Alfred Yacht Club; Royal Brighton Yacht Club; Royal Thames Yacht Club
- Class: Keelboat

Andrew Palfrey (born 26 January 1967) is a professional Australian sailor and Olympian competing in the 2008 games men's keelboat class the (Star).

== Olympic sailing ==
Together with his partner and America's World Cup competitor Iain Murray, he was named one of the country's top sailors in the all-male keelboat for the 2008 Summer Olympics, finishing in a distant fourteenth position. A full-time of the Royal Prince Alfred Yacht Club in Sydney, Palfrey trained for the Games under the tutelage of his Irish-born coach Euan McNichol.

Palfrey competed for the Australian sailing squad, as a 41-year-old crew member in the Star class, at the 2008 Summer Olympics in Beijing. Leading up to their maiden Games, he and 50-year-old skipper Murray secured the Australians a definite top-nine finish in their respective boat at the 2007 ISAF Worlds in Cascais, Portugal. The Australian duo stormed from behind at the very start to a fantastic runner-up finish in the midway of the series, before a streak of substandard outcomes in heavy winds, however, sent both Palfrey and Murray to the back of the 16-boat fleet. They sailed powerfully to eighth on the final leg, but their overall score was not enough to let the Aussies enter into the medal race, sitting them in a lowly fourteenth position with 96 net points.

He has twice won the 5.5 Metre World Championship in 2010 and 2022 and in the same class won the 2022 Scandinavian Gold Cup represented Great Britain.
