= Mogens Larsen =

Danish sailor

Personal information
- Nationality: Danish
- Born: 21 March 1950 (age 75); Helsingør, Denmark

Sport
- Sport: Sailing

Mogens Larsen (born 21 March 1950) is a Danish sailor. He competed in the Tempest event at the 1972 Summer Olympics.
