= Roman Rutkowski =

Polish sailor

Personal information
- Nationality: Polish
- Born: 28 May 1946 (age 78); Szczecin, Poland

Sport
- Sport: Sailing

Roman Rutkowski (born 28 May 1946) is a Polish sailor. He competed in the Tempest event at the 1972 Summer Olympics.
