= Sean Whitaker =

Irish sailor

Personal information
- Nationality: Irish
- Born: 11 November 1953 (age 71)

Sport
- Sport: Sailing

Sean Whitaker (born 11 November 1953) is an Irish sailor. He competed in the Tempest event at the 1972 Summer Olympics.
