= Ted Hains =

Canadian sailor

Personal information
- Born: 22 January 1948 (age 78) Kingston, Ontario, Canada

Sport
- Sport: Sailing

Ted Hains (born 22 January 1948) is a Canadian sailor. He competed in the Tempest event at the 1972 Summer Olympics.
