= Paitoon Chulatuppa =

Thai sailor

Personal information
- Nationality: Thai
- Born: 5 January 1942 (age 83)

Sport
- Sport: Sailing

Paitoon Chulatuppa (born 5 January 1942) is a Thai sailor. He competed in the Tempest event at the 1972 Summer Olympics.
