= Laurie Scott =

Laurie Scott may refer to:

- Laurie Scott (footballer) (1917–1999), English footballer
- Laurie Scott (ice hockey) (1900–1977), Canadian ice hockey player
- Laurie Scott (politician) (born 1963), Canadian politician

== See also ==
- Lawrence Scott (disambiguation)
- Larry Scott (disambiguation)
