= Lawrence Scott (disambiguation) =

Lawrence Scott is a writer.

Lawrence Scott or Laurence Scott may also refer to:

- Laurence Henry Scott (1896–?), British World War I flying ace
- Laurie Scott (footballer) (Lawrence Scott, 1917–1999), English footballer
- Laurie Scott (ice hockey) (Lawrence Young Scott, 1900–1977), Canadian ice hockey player
- Lawrence Scott (Quaker), part of A Quaker Action Group

== See also ==
- Laurie Scott (disambiguation)
- Larry Scott (disambiguation)
