= Thomas Auracher =

German yacht racer

Medal record

Sailing

Representing Germany

5.5 Metre World Championship
Gold medal – first place	2003 Curaçao	5.5m

Tempest World Championship
Gold medal – first place	2022	Tempest
Gold medal – first place	2021	Tempest
Gold medal – first place	2019	Tempest
Gold medal – first place	1993	Tempest

Thomas Auracher (born 14 December 1969) is a German sailor who competed in the 2000 Summer Olympics in the star class finishing 12th overall. He has won a total of five World championships in sailing in the Tempest and 5.5 metre.
