= Heinz Laprell =

German sailor

Personal information
- Nationality: German
- Born: 16 August 1947 (age 77); Munich, Germany

Sport
- Sport: Sailing

Heinz Laprell (born 16 August 1947) is a German sailor. He competed in the Tempest event at the 1972 Summer Olympics.
