= Klaus Føge Jensen =

Danish sailor

Personal information
- Nationality: Danish
- Born: 11 December 1944 Hedensted, Denmark
- Died: 13 August 2025 (aged 80)

Sport
- Sport: Sailing

Klaus Føge Jensen (11 December 1944 – 13 August 2025) was a Danish sailor. He competed in the Tempest event at the 1972 Summer Olympics.
