= Urs Kohler =

Swiss sailor

Personal information
- Nationality: Swiss
- Born: 2 January 1945 (age 80)

Sport
- Sport: Sailing

Urs Kohler (born 2 January 1945) is a Swiss sailor. He competed in the Tempest event at the 1972 Summer Olympics.
