= Ben Staartjes =

Dutch sailor (1928–2014)

Personal information
- Full name: Bernard Staartjes
- Nicknames: Benny, Big Ben
- Nationality: Dutch
- Born: 9 December 1928 Amsterdam, Netherlands
- Died: 17 March 2014 (aged 85) Kapellen, Belgium
- Height: 1.72 m (5.6 ft)

Sailing career
- Sport: Sailing
- Club: Koninklijke Watersport Vereniging Loosdrecht
- Classes: Tempest; Star
Medal record
Representing Netherlands
World Championships
Silver medal – second place	1970 Quiberon	Tempest
European Championships
Gold medal – first place	1972 La Rochelle	Tempest
- Updated on 18 March 2014

Bernard "Ben" Staartjes (9 December 1928, Amsterdam – 17 March 2014, Kapellen) was a sailor from the Netherlands, who represented his country at the 1972 Summer Olympics in Kiel, Germany. With crew Cees Kurpershoek he took the 5th place in the Tempest. In 1976 Staartjes represent the Netherlands again in the Tempest. This time with crew Ab Ekels They took 8th place. Later Staartjes specialized in the Star.

In 1980 Staartjes was Chef de Equipe of the Dutch Olympic Sailing Team at the 1980 Summer Olympics in Tallinn. This was the first time, and so far the only time, the Netherlands was represented at all Olympic Sailing events.

== Controversy ==
Several countries did boycott the 1980 Summer Olympics, others like France did not go since they found the competition devaluated. As result only half of the expected fleet was present during the Olympic regattas. It was the effort of Staartjes and Geert Bakker that the Dutch Olympic Sailing Team went to Tallinn.

== Sources ==
- "Ben Staartjes Bio, Stats, and Results". Olympic Sports. Sports-Reference.com. Archived from the original on 2020-04-18.
- "OS-zeilers" (in Dutch). Het vrĳe volk : democratisch-socialistisch dagblad. 1972-06-22.
- "GOED WERK VAN ZEILERS IN KIEL" (in Dutch). Leeuwarder courant : hoofdblad van Friesland. 1972-08-31.
- "Topzeilers vallen tegen" (in Dutch). De tĳd : dagblad voor Nederland. 1972-09-13.
- "The official report of the Organizing Committee for the Games of the XXth Olympiad Munich 1972, Volume 1 The organization" (PDF). Munich: proSport. 1974. Archived from the original (PDF) on 2012-08-08.
- "The official report of the Organizing Committee for the Games of the XXth Olympiad Munich 1972, Volume 2 The constructions" (PDF). Munich: proSport. 1974. Archived from the original (PDF) on 2014-02-02.
- "The official report of the Organizing Committee for the Games of the XXth Olympiad Munich 1972, Volume 3 The competitions" (PDF). Munich: proSport. 1974. Archived from the original (PDF) on 2007-09-27.
- "Nederlandse delegatie" (in Dutch). Leeuwarder courant : hoofdblad van Friesland. 1976-07-12.
- "Olympische zeilselectie" (in Dutch). De Telegraaf. 1976-05-20.
- "Montréal 1976 Official Report, Volume I: Organization" (PDF). Ottawa: COJO. 1978. Archived from the original (PDF) on February 2, 2014.
- "Montréal 1976 Official Report, Volume II: Facilities" (PDF). Ottawa: COJO. 1978. Archived from the original (PDF) on February 2, 2014.
- "Montréal 1976 Official Report, Volume III: Results" (PDF). Ottawa: COJO. 1978. Archived from the original (PDF) on January 1, 2014.
- "Zeilers:, We gaan'" (in Dutch). De Telegraaf. 1980-05-16.
- "Zeilploeg bleef buiten de medailles" (in Dutch). De Telegraaf. 1980-07-30.
- "Staartjes: "Het heeft niet meegezeten" Geen medailles voor Nederlandse zeilers" (in Dutch). De waarheid. 1980-07-31.
- "Franse zeilploeg blijft thuis" (in Dutch). Amigoe. 1980-05-22.
- "Games of the XXII Olympiad, Volume I: Moscow, Tallinn, Leningrad, Kiev and Minsk" (PDF). Fizkultura i Sport Publishers. 1981. Archived from the original (PDF) on 2013-10-17.
- "Games of the XXII Olympiad, Volume II: Organisation" (PDF). Fizkultura i Sport Publishers. 1981. Archived from the original (PDF) on 2013-10-17.
- "Games of the XXII Olympiad, Volume III: Participants and Results" (PDF). Fizkultura i Sport Publishers. 1981. Archived from the original (PDF) on October 17, 2013.
