= Roy Tutty =

Australian speed skater (1930–2019)

Personal information
- Full name: Edward Tutty
- Nationality: Australian
- Born: 7 July 1930; Melbourne, Australia
- Died: 6 January 2019 (aged 88)

Sport
- Sport: Speed skating

Edward "Roy" Tutty (7 July 1930 – 6 January 2019) was an Australian speed skater. He competed in two events at the 1960 Winter Olympics.
