= Ronald Pieper =

Dutch murderer (born 1978)

Ronald Pieper (born 1978 in Putten) is a Dutch murderer convicted for the murder of air hostess Christel Ambrosius in Putten in 1994 and the homicide of Anneke van der Stap in 2005. After allegedly fleeing the scene of the killing of Christel, two other suspects were arrested by the police. Although innocent, the latter two served a prison sentence of 10 years. After their release, Ronald Pieper was arrested in 2008, based on DNA testing which linked him to the victim. In 2013 he was sentenced to a 15.5-year sentence for the murder of Christel Ambrosius. During his imprisonment he allegedly confessed the murder on student Anneke van der Stap in 2005 in Rijswijk to a fellow convict. During his imprisonment several personal artifacts of Anneke van der Stap were found to be in his possession. Through this he was found guilty for the homicide on Anneke van der Stap and was sentence for an additional 4.5 years—a longer sentence was not possible as by law the sum of the sentences could not exceed 20 years. Since he is not cooperating with personality assessments he is not eligible for early release.

From the beginning there were people who expressed doubt about the guilt of the two convicts for the murder of Christel Ambrosius. Interest in this case was kept alive by Dutch investigative journalist Peter R. de Vries who later would become known internationally for his role in solving the case of Natalee Holloway. The assassination of De Vries in July 2021 is not thought to be related to either case.

Dutch philosopher of science Ton Derksen seriously questions the validity of the evidence in both the case against the two earlier convicts and the case against Ronald Pieper. He pleads for a retrial of both cases in his book Dubbel gedwaald (Double error), published in December 2017.

The judicial error in the conviction of the first two suspects already aroused a discussion as how the police had done their research. According to Derksen a structural reconsideration of the criminal law system in The Netherlands is necessary. Investigations can be dominated by confirmation bias in order to support a prejudiced approach of a certain suspects, rather than an open minded search for the truth on the circumstances and facts of a crime.
