= Lars Thörn =

Swedish sailor

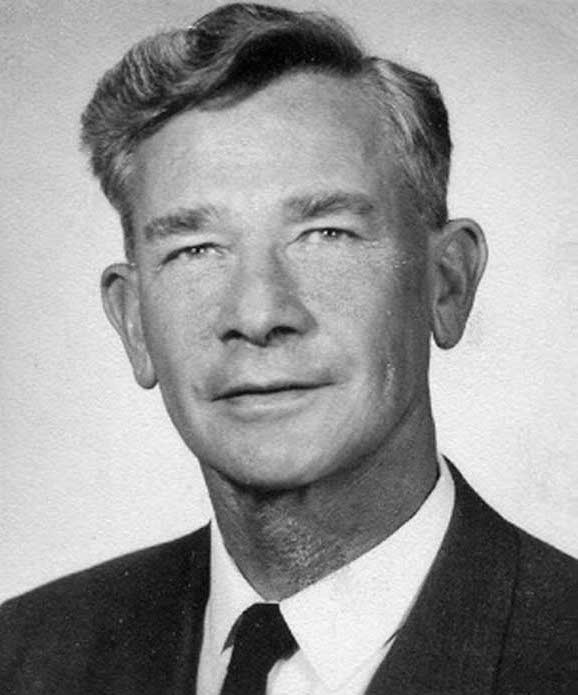
- Thörn c. 1960

Personal information
- Full name: Lars Einar Vilhelm Thörn
- Born: 26 September 1904 Eskilstuna, Sweden
- Died: 9 October 1990 (aged 86) Bromma, Stockholm, Sweden
- Height: 175 cm (5 ft 9 in)
- Weight: 70 kg (154 lb)

Sailing career
- Sport: Sailing
- Club: Royal Swedish Yacht Club
Medal record
Sailing
Representing Sweden
Olympic Games
Gold medal – first place	1956 Melbourne	5.5 metre class
Silver medal – second place	1964 Tokyo	5.5 metre class
World Championships
Silver medal – second place	1963 Seawanhaka	5.5 metre class

Lars Einar Vilhelm Thörn (26 September 1904 – 9 October 1990) was a Swedish sailor who competed in the 1956 and 1964 Summer Olympics.

In 1956 he won the gold medal as part of the Swedish boat Rush V in the 5.5 metre class event. Eight years later he won the silver medal as crew member of the Swedish boat Rush VII in the 5.5 metre class event.
