= Cees Kurpershoek =

Dutch sailor (born 1943)

Personal information
- Full name: Cornelis Kurpershoek
- Nationality: Dutch
- Born: 30 June 1943 (age 82) Amersfoort
- Height: 1.92 m (6.3 ft)

Sport
- Retired: 1974

Sailing career
- Class: Tempest
- Club: "Koninklijke Watersport Vereniging Loosdrecht"
Medal record
Sailing
Representing Netherlands
World Championship
Silver medal – second place	1970 Quiberon	Tempest
European Championship
Gold medal – first place	1972 La Rochelle	Tempest
- Updated on 2013-12-21

Cornelis "Cees" Kurpershoek (born 30 June 1943 in Amersfoort) is a sailor from the Netherlands, who represented his native country at the 1972 Summer Olympics in Kiel, Germany. With helmsman Ben Staartjes Kurpershoek took the 5th place in the Tempest.

== Sources ==
- "Cees Kurpershoek Bio, Stats, and Results". Olympic Sports. Sports-Reference.com. Archived from the original on 2020-04-18.
- "OS-zeilers". Het vrĳe volk : democratisch-socialistisch dagblad (in Dutch). 1972-06-22.
- "GOED WERK VAN ZEILERS IN KIEL". Leeuwarder courant : hoofdblad van Friesland (in Dutch). 1972-08-31.
- "Topzeilers vallen tegen". De tĳd : dagblad voor Nederland (in Dutch). 1972-09-13.
- "The official report of the Organizing Committee for the Games of the XXth Olympiad Munich 1972, Volume 1 The organization" (PDF). Munich: proSport. 1974. Archived from the original (PDF) on 2012-08-08.
- "The official report of the Organizing Committee for the Games of the XXth Olympiad Munich 1972, Volume 2 The constructions" (PDF). Munich: proSport. 1974. Archived from the original (PDF) on 2014-02-02.
- "The official report of the Organizing Committee for the Games of the XXth Olympiad Munich 1972, Volume 3 The competitions" (PDF). Munich: proSport. 1974. Archived from the original (PDF) on 2007-09-27.
