= Mok Cheuk Wing =

Hong Kong judoka

Personal information
- Nationality: Hong Konger
- Born: 2 February 1949 (age 76)

Chinese name
- Traditional Chinese: 莫卓榮
- Hanyu Pinyin: Mò Zhuōróng
- Jyutping: Mok6 Coek3 wing4

Sport
- Sport: Judo

Mok Cheuk Wing (born 2 February 1949) is a Hong Kong judoka. He competed at the 1972 Summer Olympics and the 1976 Summer Olympics.
