= Peer Moberg =

Norwegian sailor (born 1971)

Medal record

Sailing

Representing Norway

Olympic Games
Bronze medal – third place	1996 Atlanta	Laser

5.5 Metre World Championship
Silver medal – second place	2010 Lake Garda	5.5m

Peer Moberg (born 14 February 1971) is a Norwegian sailor and Olympic medalist. He competed at the 1996 Summer Olympics in Atlanta, where he received a bronze medal in the Laser class.

He competed in the Finn class at the 2008 Summer Olympics in Beijing.
