= Anders Pedersen (sailor) =

Norwegian competitive sailor (born 1991)

Personal information
- Full name: Anders Østre Pedersen
- Born: 4 May 1992 (age 34) Lørenskog, Norway
- Height: 189 cm (6 ft 2 in)

Sailing career
- Sport: Sailing
- Class(es): Finn, ILCA 7, Soling, 5.5 metre
Medal record
Sailing
Representing Norway
World Championships
Gold medal – first place	2020 Pittwater	5.5 Metre

Anders Østre Pedersen (born 4 May 1992, in Lørenskog) is a Norwegian competitive sailor.

He competed in the Finn class at the 2016 Summer Olympics in Rio de Janeiro and the 2020 Summer Olympics in Tokyo.
