= Gardner Cox =

American sailor

Personal information
- Born: 5 February 1920 Wilmington, US
- Died: 30 March 1988 (aged 68) Villanova, US

Sport
- Sport: Sailing

Gardner Cox (5 February 1920 – 30 March 1988) was an American sailor. He competed in the 5.5 Metre event at the 1968 Summer Olympics.
