= Peter Dean (sailor) =

American sailor

Personal information
- Full name: Peter Sweetser Dean
- Born: March 6, 1951 (age 75) Boston, Massachusetts, U.S.

Sailing career
- Sport: Sailing
Medal record
Sailing
Representing United States
Olympic Games
Bronze medal – third place	1972 Munich	Tempest
World Championships
Gold medal – first place	1971 Marstrand	Tempest

Peter Sweetser Dean (born March 6, 1951) is an American sailor and design educator.

== Early life and education ==
Dean was born in 1951 in Boston, Massachusetts. He graduated from Milton Academy in 1969. He later studied at the Rhode Island School of Design, both as an architect and as a furniture designer under Tage Frid, graduating in 1977 with a B.F.A. He went on to receive an M.F.A. from Boston University.

== Athletic career ==
Dean won a bronze medal in the Tempest class with Glen Foster at the 1972 Summer Olympics.

== Academic career ==
Dean is currently a Senior Critic of Furniture Design at the Rhode Island School of Design, and teaches the core course in the Nature-Culture-Sustainability concentration.
