= Larry Scott (sailor) =

Canadian sailor

Personal information
- Born: 5 August 1947 (age 79) Hamilton, Ontario, Canada

Sport
- Sport: Sailing

Larry Scott (born 5 August 1947) is a Canadian sailor. He competed in the Tempest event at the 1972 Summer Olympics.
