= Peter Frey (sailor) =

Swiss sailor

Personal information
- Nationality: Swiss
- Born: 10 November 1949 (age 75)

Sport
- Sport: Sailing

Peter Frey (born 10 November 1949) is a Swiss sailor. He competed in the Tempest event at the 1972 Summer Olympics.
