= Gilbert Lennox-King =

Hong Kong sailor

Gilbert Roland Lennox-King
Personal information
- Nationality: NEW ZEALANDER
- Born: 9 April 1947 (age 78) Mombasa, East Africa
- Died: 8 August 2024 Napflion, Greece

Sport
- Sport: Sailing

Gilbert Lennox-King (born 9 April 1947) is a Hong Kong sailor. He competed in the Tempest event at the 1972 Summer Olympics.
