= Bill Steele (sailor) =

Hong Kong sailor

Personal information
- Nationality: Hong Konger
- Born: 21 February 1940 (age 85)

Sport
- Sport: Sailing

Bill Steele (born 21 February 1940) is a Hong Kong sailor. He competed in the Flying Dutchman event at the 1972 Summer Olympics.
