= Håkan Lindquist =

Swedish writer (1958–2022)

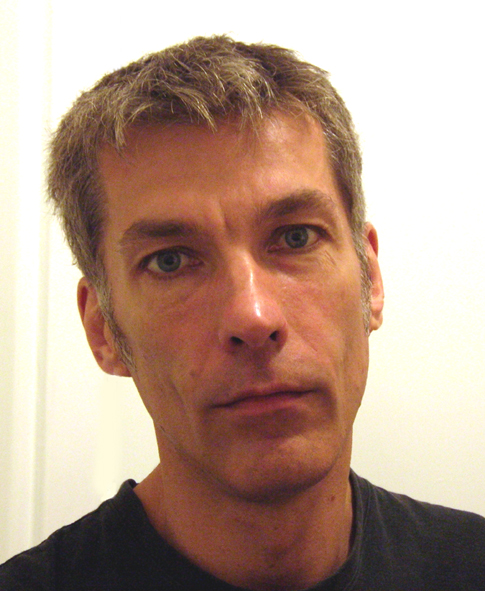
- Lindquist in 2006
- Born: Gert Håkan Lindquist; 28 March 1958; Oskarshamn, Sweden
- Died: 15 December 2022 (aged 64); Stockholm, Sweden
- Occupation: Writer

Håkan Lindquist (28 March 1958 – 15 December 2022) was a Swedish writer.

== Biography ==
Lindquist made his debut in 1993 with the novel Min bror och hans bror, which was translated into several languages and received the Prix littéraire de la Bordelaise de Lunetterie. He also wrote several articles in Scandinavian cultural magazines, as well as short stories published in Sweden, Finland, Norway, Iceland, France, Germany, Hungary, and the United States. He wrote the libretto for the opera William with music by the composer B. Tommy Andersson.

Lindquist died in Stockholm on 15 December 2022, at the age of 64.

== Novels ==
- My Brother and his Brother (original: Min bror och hans bror, 1993)
- Dröm att leva (1996)
- On collecting stamps (original: Om att samla frimärken, 2003)
- I ett annat land (2006)
- Nära vatten (2010)
- Regn och åska (2011)
- Requiem (2013)
- Tre dagar och två nätter (2013)
- Ariel tjugofyra/sju (2020)
