= Claes Turitz =

Swedish sailor

Claes Turitz (28 August 1928 – 1 April 2005) was a Swedish sailor who competed in the 1960 Summer Olympics.
