= Valentin Mankin =

Soviet sailor

Personal information
- Nationality: Ukrainian
- Born: 19 August 1938 Kyiv, Ukrainian SSR, Soviet Union
- Died: 1 June 2014 (aged 75) Viareggio, Italy

Sport
- Sport: Sailing
- Events: Finn, Tempest class, Star class
Medal record
Summer Olympic Games
Gold medal – first place	1968 Mexico City	Finn class
Gold medal – first place	1972 Munich	Tempest class
Silver medal – second place	1976 Montreal	Tempest class
Gold medal – first place	1980 Moscow	Star class
Tempest World Championship
Gold medal – first place	1973 Napoli

Valentin Grigoryevich Mankin (Russian: Валентин Григорьевич Манкин, Ukrainian: Валентин Григорович Манкин; 19 August 1938 – 1 June 2014) was a Soviet/Ukrainian sailor from Kyiv, three times Olympic champion for the USSR team.

== Life ==
Mankin was Jewish. He trained at VSS Vodnik and scored his first Olympic triumph at the 1968 Summer Olympics in Mexico City, when he dominated his 35 opponents in the Finn class, finishing first or second in five of the seven races to win the gold medal.

At the 1972 Summer Olympics in Munich, Mankin switched classes and teamed with Vitaly Dyrdyra to win the Tempest class. At the 1976 Summer Olympics in Montreal he added a silver with a new partner, Vladyslav Akimenko. At the 1980 Summer Olympics in Moscow at the age of 41 years with Aleksandr Muzychenko, he raced in the Star class. The contest went down to the final race, but Mankin pulled off the victory and won the Gold Medal.

At the end of the eighties he moved to Livorno, Italy, as technical director and coach of the Italian Sailing Federation, where he trained a top generation of sailors. In Livorno, he also founded the Olympic Training Centre, dedicated to Beppe Croce (Olympic sailor and President of Italian Sailing Federation).

As of 2005, Valentin Mankin remains the only sailor in Olympic history to win gold medals in three different classes. (Finn, Tempest and Star).

He died on 1 June 2014 in Viareggio, Italy.

== See also ==
- List of select Jews in sailing

== Bibliography ==
- V. V. Kukushkin (1978). Valentyn Mankin. Heroes of the Olympic Games (in Russian). Moscow: Fizkultura i sport. Archived from the original on 2007-10-25.
