= Robert Elliott (fencer) =

Hong Kong fencer

Personal information
- Born: 20 July 1950 (age 75)

Sport
- Sport: Fencing

Robert Samuel Elliott (born 20 July 1950) is a Hong Kong épée, foil and sabre fencer. He competed in the three individual events at the 1972 Summer Olympics.
