= Kenneth Tomlins =

Hong Kong sailor

Personal information
- Nationality: Hong Konger
- Born: 2 January 1938 (age 87)

Sport
- Sport: Sailing

Kenneth Tomlins (born 2 January 1938) is a Hong Kong sailor. He competed in the Tempest event at the 1972 Summer Olympics.
