= Ulf Sundelin =

Swedish sailor

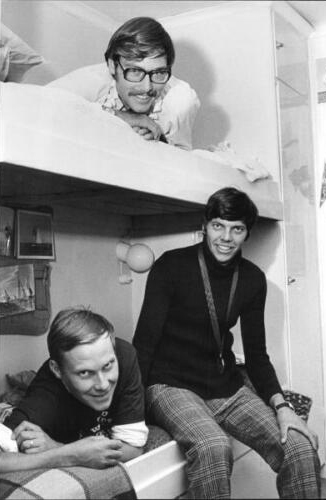
- Peter (top), Jörgen and Ulf (right) in 1968

Personal information
- Full name: Ulf Artur Sundelin
- Nationality: Sweden
- Born: 26 August 1943 (age 82) Nacka, Sweden
- Height: 185 cm (6 ft 1 in)
- Weight: 73 kg (161 lb)

Sailing career
- Sport: Sailing
- Club: Royal Swedish Yacht Club
- Classes: 5.5 metre, Dragon
Medal record
Representing Sweden
Olympic Games
Gold medal – first place	1968 Mexico City	5.5 m class
World championships
Silver medal – second place	1969 Sandhamn	5.5 m
Gold medal – first place	1971 Hobart	Dragon
Gold medal – first place	1986 Sydney	5.5 m

Ulf Artur Sundelin (born 26 August 1943) is a retired Swedish sailor. Together with his younger brothers Peter and Jörgen he won a gold medal in the 5.5 metre class at the 1968 Olympics and a silver medal at the 1969 World Championships. The brothers also won the 1971 world title in the three-person keelboat (Dragon class) and placed sixth at the 1972 Olympics.
