= Craig Symonette =

Bahamian sailor

Personal information
- Full name: Roland Craig Symonette
- Nationality: Bahamian
- Born: 21 August 1951 (age 75)
- Height: 180 cm (5 ft 11 in)

Sailing career
- Sport: Sailing
- Class: Soling
Medal record
Sailing
Representing Bahamas
5.5 Metre World Championships
Bronze medal – third place	2000 Medemblik	5.5m
Bronze medal – third place	2001 Glücksburg	5.5m
Bronze medal – third place	2002 Helsinki	5.5m
- Updated on 2 March 2014

Roland Craig Symonette (born 21 August 1951) is a sailor from The Bahamas. Symonetten represented his country at the 1972 Summer Olympics in Kiel. Symonette took 25th place in the Soling with his half brother Bobby Symonette as helmsman and Percy Knowles as fellow crew member.
