= Hankø =

Norwegian island in the Oslofjord, Østfold County

Coordinates: 59.2092°N 10.7739°E

Hankø is an island located in the Oslofjord, Østfold County, Norway. It used to be the property of the Dano-Norwegian king, the site where the king hunted deer. Later an island of retreat, notable visitors are the Norwegian king, Princess Märtha Louise of Norway, and her husband Ari Behn. Their second child, Leah Isadora Behn was born at their estate "Bloksberg" in 2005.

Hankø is well known internationally as a venue for the sport of sailing, having hosted several world championships in different yacht classes. It is the host of annual sailing competitions in the summer, drawing international competitors in many classes including the Melges class. The island has many summer cottages, mainly owned by inhabitants from Oslo, the capital of Norway. This is due to the close proximity to the capital. The island is connected to the mainland, at a beautiful place called Vikene, by a ferry, going to and fro as the need arises. There is a hotel on the island with a spa (after recent refurbishment), which is heavily dependent on corporate customers.

Hankø is also well known as a high-end destination for wealthy Norwegians to spend their summers. The area is characterized by a relatively discreet and calm atmosphere, with a number of expensive cabins and holiday homes. It is also noted for its attractive coastal landscape, featuring a typical Norwegian archipelago with smooth rocks and sheltered waters, making it a popular place for relaxation and leisure activities.

== Name ==
The name (Old Norse: Hanki) is derived from hǫnk 'handle'. The island was probably considered to be the 'handle' of the peninsula Onsøy.

== Geography ==
A picture of Trouville Bad on the island of Hankø

The island stretches north to south for about 6 km. It is divided from the mainland by the Hankøsund, a stretch of water which runs about the length of the island. The north point is called "the north cape", and the southern tip marks the end of the "Hankøsund". The yachting is centered around the "Hankø Yacht Club" which lies in the Hankøsund close to the mainland. This private club has only about 150 members, membership only available upon invitation.

== Climate ==
In the summer, the temperature is usually in the mid 20s (Celsius), and the water temperature can exceed 20 degrees Celsius in July/ August. The winters can be harsh, especially for the deer living on the island year round.
