= Ingvar Hansson =

Swedish sailor

Medal record

Sailing

Representing Sweden

Olympic Games
| Gold medal – first place | 1976 Montreal | Tempest class |

Ingvar Hansson (born 19 February 1947) is a Swedish sailor and Olympic champion. He competed at the 1976 Summer Olympics in Montreal, where he received a gold medal in the Tempest class, together with John Albrechtson.
