= John Albrechtson =

Swedish sailor (1936–1985)

Personal information
- Nationality: Sweden
- Born: 22 July 1936 Gothenburg, Sweden
- Died: 27 August 1985 (aged 49) Västra Frölunda, Sweden

Sailing career
- Sport: Sailing
- Club: Vikingaflottiljen (1968); Royal Gothenburg Yacht Club (1972–76)
- Class(es): Star, Tempest
Medal record
Sailing
Representing Sweden
Olympic Games
Gold medal – first place	1976 Montreal	Tempest class
World Championships
Gold medal – first place	1966 Kiel	Star class
Gold medal – first place	1977 Strömstad	Tempest class
Gold medal – first place	1978 Castelletto	Tempest class
Silver medal – second place	1975 Association Island	Tempest class
Bronze medal – third place	1971 Seattle	Star class

John Albrechtson (22 July 1936 – 27 August 1985) was a Swedish sailor. Between 1968 and 1978 he won one Olympic gold medal and three gold, one silver and one bronze medals at the world championships.

== Biography ==
Albrechtson started his sailing career in the Stjärnbåt class and moved on to Star class in 1957. He won his first Star Swedish Championships in 1966. The same year, together with Paul Elvstrøm, he won the Star World Championship.

Between 1971 and 1978 Albrechtson competed in the Tempest class. At the 1976 Summer Olympics he won the Olympic gold medal together with Ingvar Hansson. He also competed at the 1968 and 1972 Summer Olympics, placing ninth and fourth, respectively. At the 1980 Games he was part of Swedish reserve team.

Albrechtson committed suicide in Västra Frölunda aged 49.
