= Mark Holowesko =

Bahamian sailor

Personal information
- Nationality: Bahamian
- Born: 12 March 1960 (age 66)

Sport
- Sport: Sailing

Mark Holowesko (born 12 March 1960) is a Bahamian former sailor. He competed in the Star event at the 1996 Summer Olympics.

He began his career in finance working for Sir John Templeton, a fellow Bahamian resident. Mark later started his own hedge fund "Holowesko Partners".

Mark Holowesko graduated from The College of the Holy Cross in 1970 as a co-captain of the men's rowing team. Honored through an endowment establishing the Holowesko Family Head Coach of Men’s Rowing position.

Mark Holowesko is the son of William P Holowesko, a Bahamian American lawyer, and Lynn Pyform.
