= Albert B. Fay =

American politician and diplomat (1913–1992)

United States Ambassador to Trinidad and Tobago
- In office February 17, 1976 – April 5, 1977
- President: Gerald Ford
- Preceded by: Lloyd I. Miller
- Succeeded by: Richard K. Fox Jr.

Personal details
- Born: February 26, 1913 New Orleans, Louisiana, U.S.
- Died: February 29, 1992 (aged 79) Cuernavaca, Morelos, Mexico
- Party: Republican
- Spouse: Homoiselle Haden (m. 1935)
- Education: Yale University (BS)

Albert Bel Fay (February 26, 1913 – February 29, 1992) was an American businessman and politician who served as the United States Ambassador to Trinidad and Tobago from 1976 to 1977.

Fay was born on February 26, 1913, in New Orleans, the son of Charles Spencer and Marie Dorothy (Bel) Fay.

He and his family moved to Houston in 1928. There he attended San Jacinto High School. In 1936, he graduated with a B.S. in geology from Yale University, where he was a member of St. Anthony Hall.

He was commissioned as an ensign in the United States Naval Reserve. During World War II, Fay commanded a submarine chaser, and served on the staff of the Submarine Chaser Training Center in Miami and then as first lieutenant on USS Yokes at Okinawa.

Fay and his brother founded Seabrook Shipyard in 1938 and built submarine chasers and rescue boats during World War II. During his business career, he went on to found and serve as a business executive in several businesses, including being the cofounder, vice president, and director of the family-owned Bel Oil Corporation.

He was a member of the Republican National Committee from Texas and a delegate to the Republican National Convention from Texas, 1960. He was appointed by Gerald Ford the U.S. Ambassador to Trinidad and Tobago from 1976 to 1977.

Fay died in Cuernavaca, Morelos, Mexico, on February 29, 1992, at the age of 79. He was buried at Glenwood Cemetery, Houston.

Party political offices
Preceded by Axtell Byles	Republican nominee for Land Commissioner of Texas; 1962	Succeeded by John Matthews
Preceded by John Matthews	Republican nominee for Land Commissioner of Texas; 1966	Succeeded by Millard Neptune
Diplomatic posts
Preceded by Lloyd I. Miller	United States Ambassador to Trinidad and Tobago; 1976–1977	Succeeded by Richard K. Fox Jr.
