= Peter Sundelin =

Swedish sailor

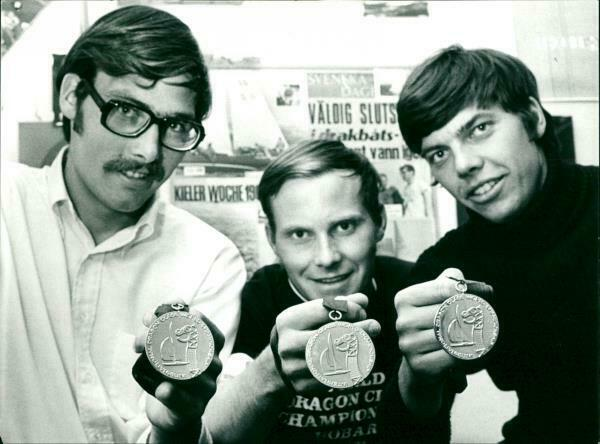
- Peter (left), Jörgen and Ulf in 1968

Personal information
- Full name: Peter Nils Sundelin
- Nationality: Sweden
- Born: 13 January 1947 (age 79) Nacka, Sweden
- Height: 191 cm (6 ft 3 in)
- Weight: 87 kg (192 lb)

Sailing career
- Sport: Sailing
- Club: Royal Swedish Yacht Club; Skuru IK
- Classes: 5.5 metre, Dragon, Star, Soling
Medal record
Sailing
Representing Sweden
Olympic Games
Gold medal – first place	1968 Mexico City	5.5 m class
World championships
Silver medal – second place	1969 Sandhamn	5.5 m
Gold medal – first place	1971 Hobart	Dragon
European championships
Silver medal – second place	1978 Medemblik	Star

Peter Nils Sundelin (born 13 January 1947) is a retired Swedish sailor. Together with his elder brothers Jörgen and Ulf he won a gold medal in the 5.5 metre class at the 1968 Olympics and a silver medal at the 1969 World Championships. The brothers also won the 1971 world title in the three-person keelboat (Dragon class) and placed sixth and ninth at the 1972 and 1976 Olympics, respectively.

Peter was the strongest physically among the Sundelin brothers. In the 1980s, he competed with different partners in the two-person keelboat at the 1980 Olympics and world championships. Besides sailing he played ice hockey for Skuru IK.
