= Jörgen Sundelin =

Swedish sailor (born 1945)

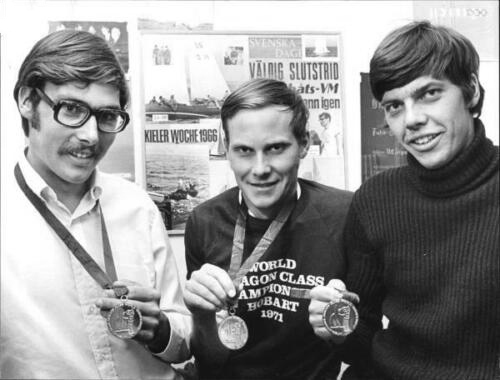
- Peter, Jörgen (center) and Ulf in 1968

Personal information
- Full name: Jörgen Lars Sundelin
- Nationality: Sweden
- Born: 15 March 1945 (age 81) Stockholm, Sweden
- Height: 181 cm (5 ft 11 in)
- Weight: 70 kg (154 lb)

Sailing career
- Sport: Sailing
- Club: Royal Swedish Yacht Club
- Classes: 5.5 metre, Dragon, Star
Medal record
Representing Sweden
Olympic Games
Gold medal – first place	1968 Mexico City	5.5 m class
World championships
Silver medal – second place	1969 Sandhamn	5.5 m
Gold medal – first place	1971 Hobart	Dragon

Jörgen Lars Sundelin (born 15 March 1945) is a retired Swedish sailor. Together with his brothers Peter and Ulf he won a gold medal in the 5.5 metre class at the 1968 Olympics and a silver medal at the 1969 World Championships. The brothers also won the 1971 world title in the three-person keelboat (Dragon class) and placed sixth and ninth at the 1972 and 1976 Olympics, respectively. Besides sailing, Jörgen and Peter also played ice hockey for Skuru IK.
