= Bénodet =

Bénodet Benoded
- Commune
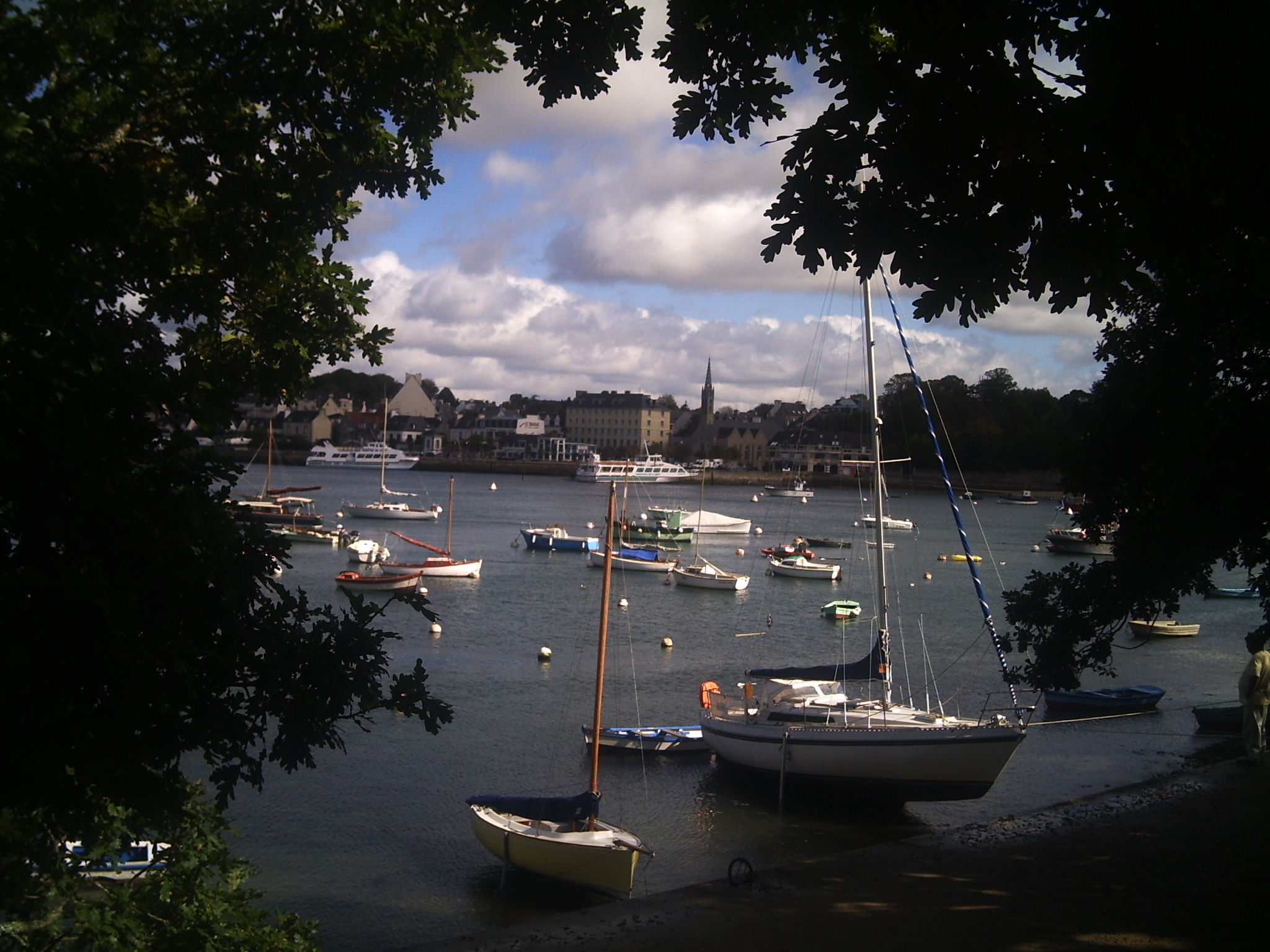
- Bénodet harbour

- Coat of arms
- Location of Bénodet
- Location within France Location within Brittany
- Coordinates: 47°52′30″N 4°06′13″W
- Country: France
- Region: Brittany
- Department: Finistère
- Arrondissement: Quimper
- Canton: Fouesnant
- Intercommunality: Pays Fouesnantais

Government
  - Mayor (2020–2026): Christian Pennanech
- Area^{1}: 10.53 km^{2} (4.07 sq mi)
- Highest elevation: 59 m (194 ft)
- Lowest elevation: 0 m (0 ft)
- Population (2023): 3,849
  - Density: 365.5/km^{2} (946.7/sq mi)
- Time zone: UTC+01:00 (CET)
  - Summer (DST): UTC+02:00 (CEST)
- INSEE/Postal code: 29006 /29950
- Website: www.mairie-benodet.fr
- ^{1} French Land Register data, which excludes lakes, ponds, glaciers > 1 km^{2} (0.386 sq mi or 247 acres) and river estuaries.

Bénodet (French pronunciation: [benɔdɛ]; Breton: Benoded) is a commune in the Finistère department and administrative region of Brittany in north-western France. It lies about 16 kilometres south of Quimper. The Breton name Benoded means "mouth of the Odet".

Bénodet has a casino, a thalassotherapy centre, a cinema, a marina, a number of hotels, and several beaches. As with many coastal towns in Brittany, there are many second homes and the population increases sixfold over the summer period. Bénodet is also the site of menhirs and a church, dedicated to the 5th-century Irish saint Brigid of Kildare, which was built at the end of the 11th century and was classed as a historic monument in 1916.

== Population ==
In French the inhabitants of Bénodet are known as Bénodetois.

Historical population

Year	Pop.	±% p.a.
1793	429	—
1800	529	+3.04%
1806	565	+1.10%
1821	579	+0.16%
1831	667	+1.42%
1836	710	+1.26%
1841	643	−1.96%
1846	712	+2.06%
1851	680	−0.92%
1856	676	−0.12%
1861	657	−0.57%
1866	705	+1.42%
1872	622	−2.07%
1876	704	+3.14%
1881	741	+1.03%
1886	781	+1.06%
1891	875	+2.30%
1896	1,035	+3.42%
1901	1,094	+1.11%

Year	Pop.	±% p.a.
1906	1,234	+2.44%
1911	1,362	+1.99%
1921	1,312	−0.37%
1926	1,346	+0.51%
1931	1,421	+1.09%
1936	1,549	+1.74%
1946	1,675	+0.79%
1954	1,674	−0.01%
1962	1,882	+1.47%
1968	1,922	+0.35%
1975	2,087	+1.18%
1982	2,285	+1.30%
1990	2,436	+0.80%
1999	2,750	+1.36%
2007	3,168	+1.78%
2012	3,453	+1.74%
2017	3,568	+0.66%
2023	3,849	+1.27%

Source: EHESS and INSEE (1968–2023)

== Events ==
Most events in the town take place in the summer months, as part of the town's bustling summer season. In May, the Odet yacht club organizes the Obelix Trophy, a sailing race with about 100 boats taking part over four days. Every year the commune mounts a series of Friday-evening music concerts – French pop rock group Superbus played there in 2005. A market is held in the town centre each Monday.

== International relations ==
Bénodet is twinned with

- (United Kingdom) Torpoint, Cornwall, UK
- (United Kingdom) Antony, Cornwall, UK

== See also ==
- Communes of the Finistère department
