= Kristian Nergaard =

Norwegian sailor

Personal information
- Nationality: Norway
- Born: 1 April 1962 (age 64)

Sailing career
- Sport: Sailing
- Classes: Soling, Yngling_(keelboat), Melges 24, 5.5 metre
Medal record
Sailing
World Championships
Gold medal – first place	1990	5.5 Metre
Gold medal – first place	1993	5.5 Metre
Gold medal – first place	1996	5.5 Metre
Gold medal – first place	2003	5.5 Metre
Gold medal – first place	2008	5.5 Metre
Gold medal – first place	2009	5.5 Metre
Gold medal – first place	2012	5.5 Metre
Gold medal – first place	2015	5.5 Metre
Gold medal – first place	2016	5.5 Metre
Gold medal – first place	2019	5.5 Metre
Gold medal – first place	2020	5.5 Metre
Silver medal – second place	1985	Yngling
Silver medal – second place	1986	Yngling
Silver medal – second place	1994	5.5 Metre
Silver medal – second place	2007	5.5 Metre
Silver medal – second place	2010	5.5 Metre
Silver medal – second place	2010	Melges 24
Silver medal – second place	2011	5.5 Metre
Silver medal – second place	2013	5.5 Metre
Silver medal – second place	2014	5.5 Metre
Silver medal – second place	2026	Yngling
Bronze medal – third place	1991	5.5 Metre
Bronze medal – third place	2018	5.5 Metre
Bronze medal – third place	2024	Soling
European Championships
Gold medal – first place	2023	Soling
Gold medal – first place	2024	Soling

Kristian Nergaard (born 1 April 1962) is a Norwegian sailor who has 11 World championships in sailing all in the 5.5 metre class.
