= Vitaliy Dyrdyra =

Soviet sailor (1938–2024)

Medal record

Sailing

Representing Soviet Union

Olympic Games
| Gold medal – first place | 1972 Munich | Tempest class |

Vitaliy Dyrdyra (Ukrainian: Віталій Федорович Дирдира; 4 November 1938 – 6 December 2024) was a sailor, and Olympic champion for the Soviet Union.

Dyrdyra was born in Cherkasy Oblast, Ukraine on 4 November 1938. He won a gold medal in the Tempest Class at the 1972 Summer Olympics in Munich, together with Valentin Mankin. Dyrdyra died on 6 December 2024, at the age of 86.
