= Glen Foster =

American sailor

Personal information
- Full name: Glen Seward Foster II
- Born: August 14, 1930 Orange, New Jersey, U.S.
- Died: October 1, 1999 (aged 69) New York City, New York, U.S.

Sport
- College team: Brown University
Medal record
Sailing
Representing United States
Olympic Games
Bronze medal – third place	1972 Munich	Tempest
World Championships
Gold medal – first place	1971 Marstrand	Tempest
Gold medal – first place	1995 Hanko	5.5m
Gold medal – first place	1997 Key Biscayne	5.5m
Gold medal – first place	1998 Cowes	5.5m
Silver medal – second place	1996 Muiden	5.5m
Bronze medal – third place	1993 Hankø	5.5m
Bronze medal – third place	1999 Torbole	5.5m

Glen Seward Foster II (August 14, 1930 – October 1, 1999) was an American sailor. He won a bronze medal in the Tempest class with Peter Dean at the 1972 Summer Olympics.

In 1971, when he won the national and world championships in the Tempest Class.
