= Tempest (keelboat) =

Sailboat class

- T

Development
- Designer: Ian Proctor
- Location: United Kingdom
- Year: 1965
- No. built: 1201 (by 2025)
- Builders: Lanaverre; Mader Bootswerft; O'Day Corp. Plastrend/Composite Technologies
- Role: one-design racer
- Name: Tempest

Boat
- Crew: two
- Displacement: 1,021 lb (463 kg)
- Draft: 3.58 ft (1.09 m)
- Trapeze: single

Hull
- Type: monohull
- Construction: fiberglass
- LOA: 22.00 ft (6.71 m)
- LWL: 20.00 ft (6.10 m)
- Beam: 6.50 ft (1.98 m)

Hull appendages
- Keel: lifting weighted bulb keel
- Ballast: 440 lb (200 kg)
- Rudder: internally-mounted spade-type rudder

Rig
- Rig type: Bermuda rig

Sails
- Sailplan: fractional rigged sloop
- Mainsail area: 164 sq ft (15.2 m^{2})
- Jib/genoa area: 82.78 sq ft (7.691 m^{2})
- Spinnaker area: 225 sq ft (20.9 m^{2})
- Total sail area: 247 sq ft (22.9 m^{2})

Racing
- D-PN: 83.4

The Tempest is a trailerable, one-design racing sailboat that was designed by British naval architect Ian Proctor and first built in 1965.

== Production ==
In the past the design was built by O'Day Corp. and Plastrend/Composite Technologies in the United States and by Lanaverre in France. A total of 1201 boats had been reported as built by 2025. Today it is built by Mader Bootswerft of Germany and remains in production.

== Design ==
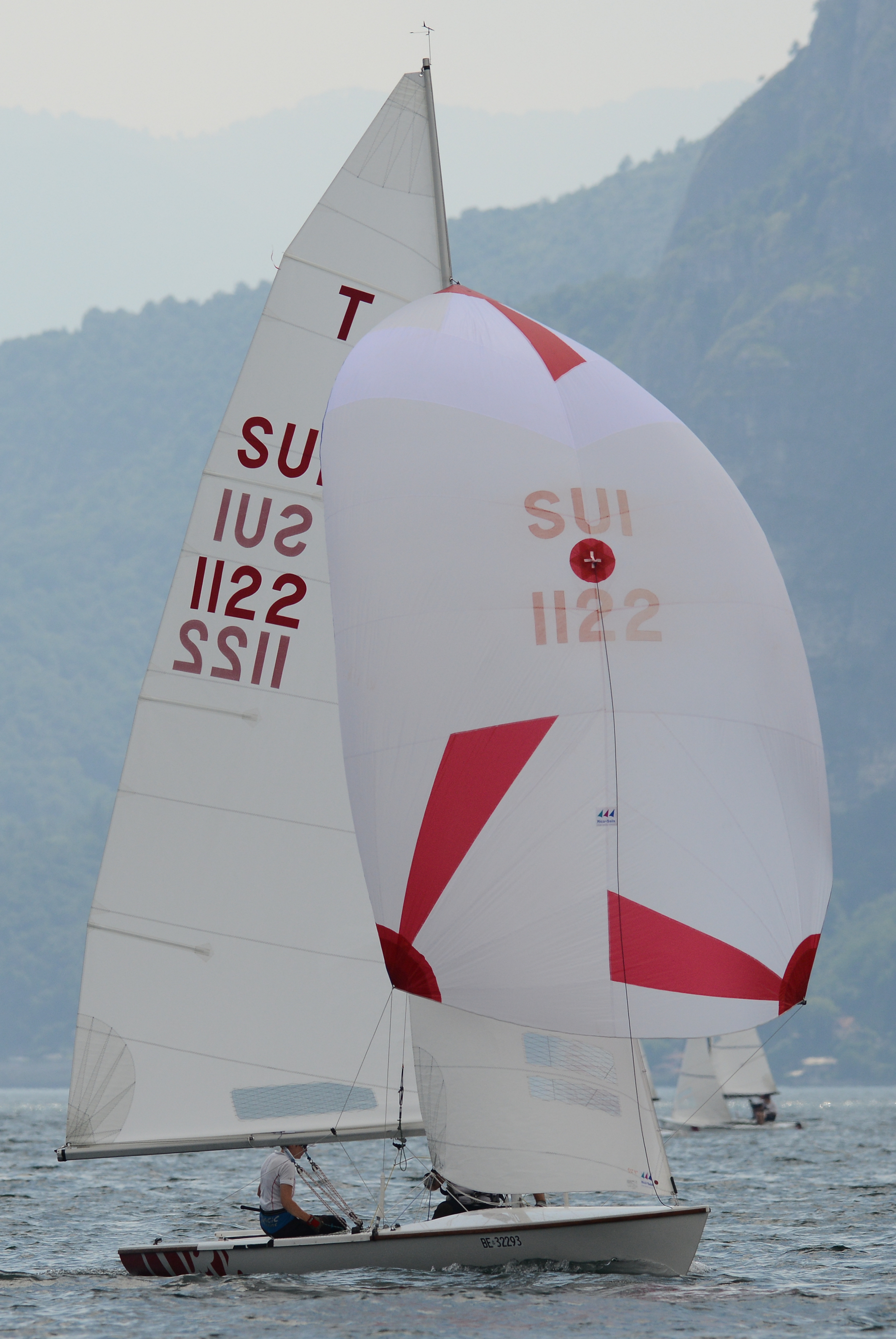
Tempest sailing downwind with spinnaker

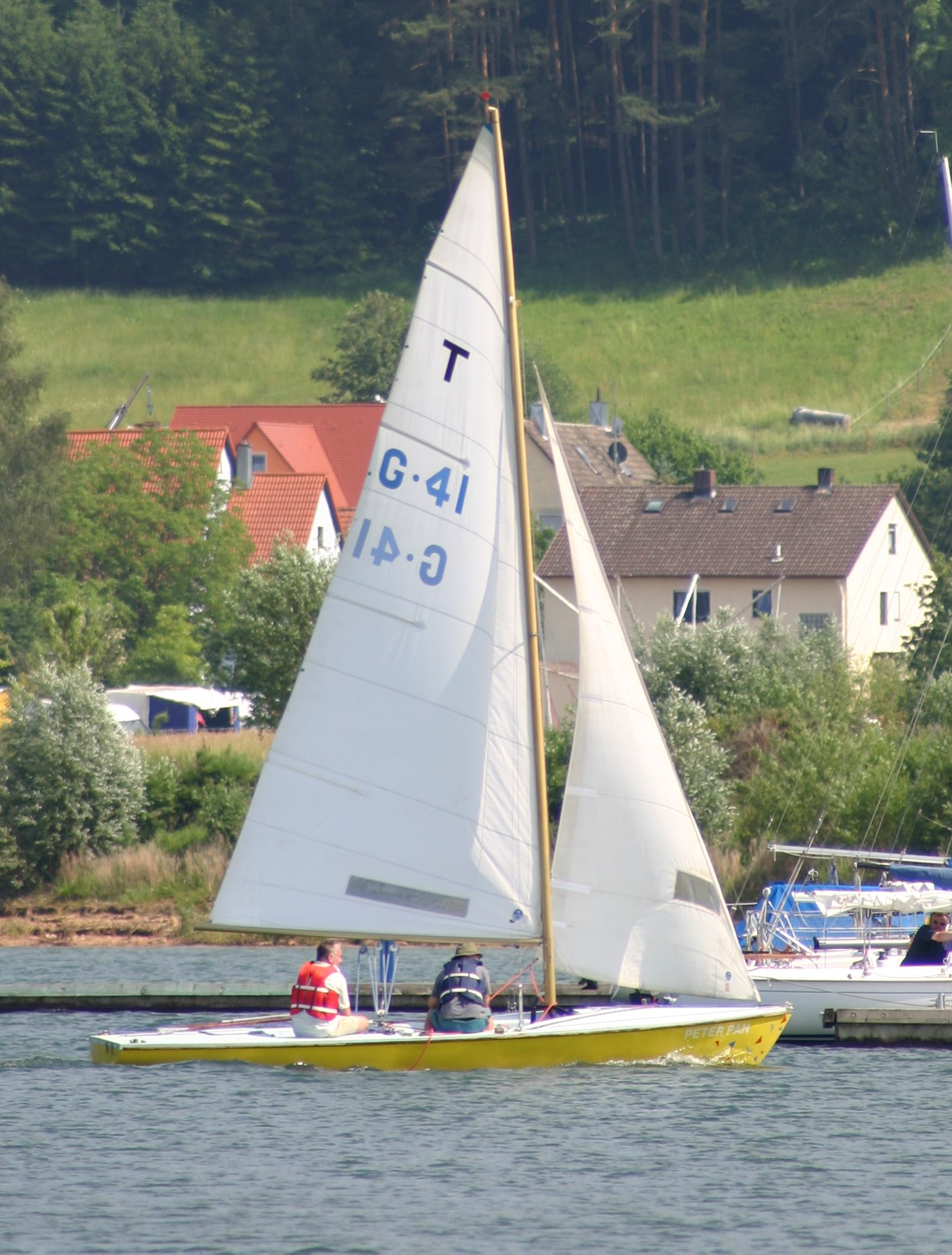
Tempest

The Tempest is a racing keelboat, built predominantly of fiberglass, with wood trim. It has a fractional sloop rig with aluminum spars. The hull has a spooned raked stem, a plumb transom, an internally mounted spade-type rudder controlled by a tiller and a lifting, weighted, bulb keel. It displaces 1,021 lb (463 kg) and carries 440 lb (200 kg) of lead keel ballast. Construction includes three transverse bulkheads to aid flotation. The boat has a rear deck above the rudder.

The boat has a draft of 3.58 ft (1.09 m) with the keel locked in the extended position.

For sailing the design is equipped with a single trapeze, an unusual feature on a keelboat. Jib and mainsail windows for visibility are permitted in the class rules, but the sizes are controlled.

The design has a Portsmouth Yardstick DP-N racing average handicap of 83.4 and an RYA-PN of 942. It is normally raced with a crew of two sailors.

== Operational history ==
The boat was selected as an Olympic class and raced at the 1972 and the 1976 Summer Olympics.

The boat is supported by an active class club that organizes racing events, the International Tempest Class Association.

In a 1994 review Richard Sherwood wrote, "the International Class Tempest was an Olympic boat in 1972 and 1976. She is fast. Tempest is a one-design, and class rules are strict ... The mast’s design and material are optional, but the mast may not rotate. Older boats have thicker, stiffer masts and, in addition to the diamond shrouds and spreaders found today, additional swept-back spreaders. Good racing boats are light at the ends and rigid, although this is not necessary in the deck ... Only one person may use the trapeze, and safety equipment is required."
