= Star Sailors League =

SSL
- Star Sailors League SA
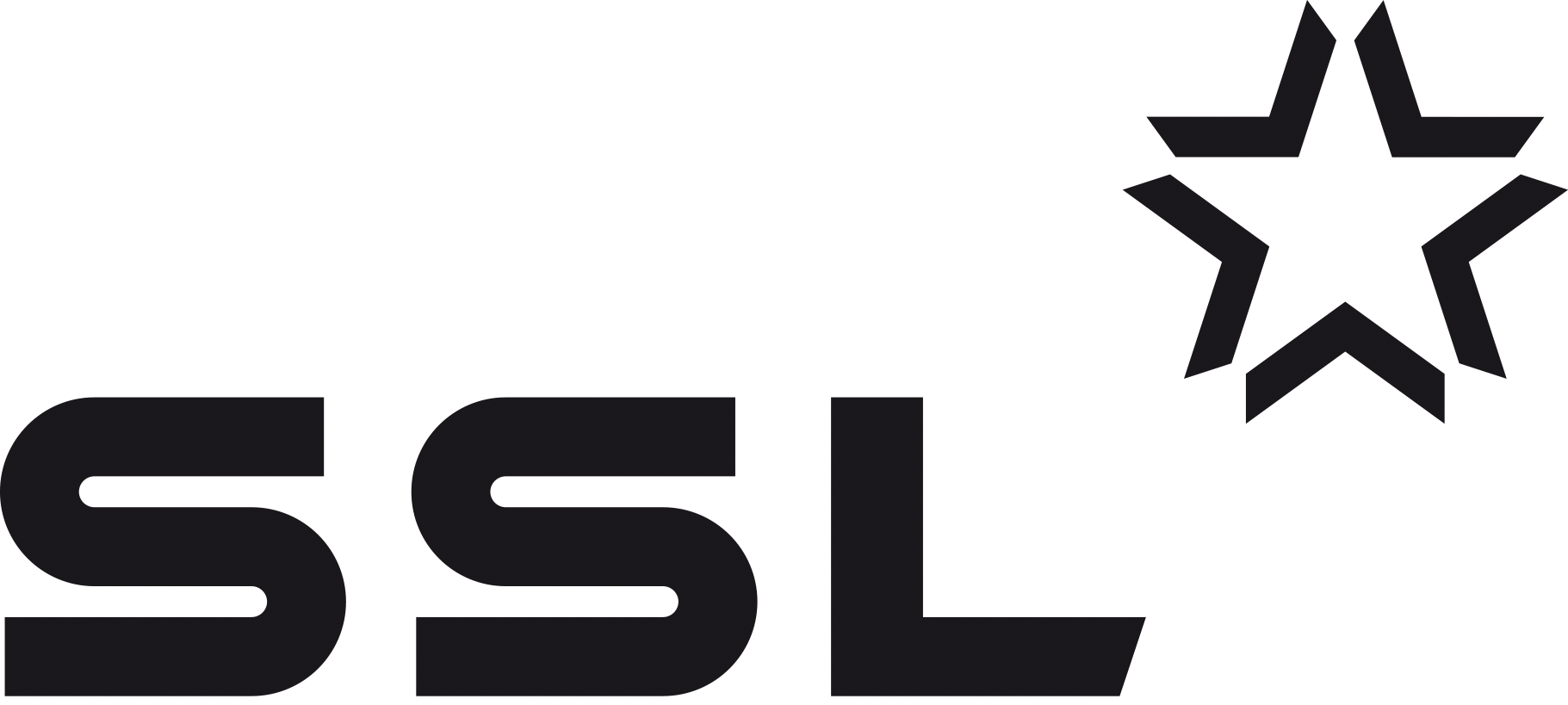
- Official SSL Logo

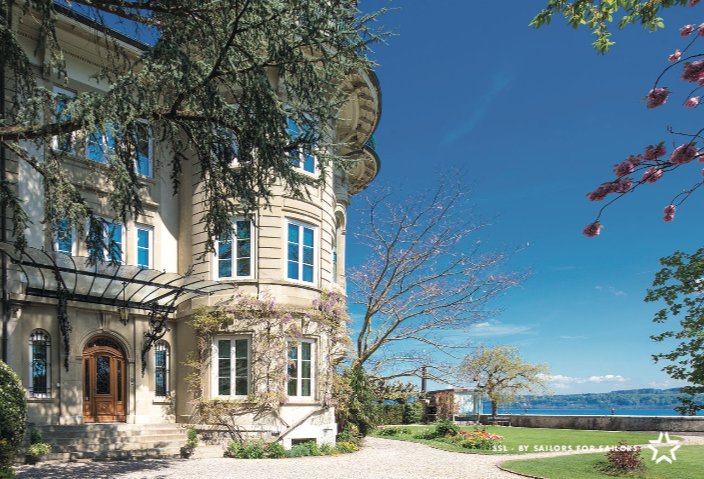
- SSL Training Center in Grandson, SUI
- Founded: 2013
- Legal status: Société Anonyme (Swiss)
- Purpose: Global inshore sailing circuit
- Headquarters: Yverdon, Switzerland (Administration); Grandson, Switzerland (Sport)
- Products: SSL Global Rankings; (Men + Women + Nations); SSL Gold Cup; (Like the World Cup in football); SSL Finals; (Annual global skippers finals); SSL Format; (Play-offs regatta system)
- Board of directors: (France) Xavier Rohart (SSL President); (Poland) Mateusz Kusznierewicz (SSL Gold Cup Director); (Germany) Frithjof Kleen (Sport Director)
- Key people: (Australia) John Bertrand; (Brazil) Bruno Prada; (Brazil) Robert Scheidt; (Croatia) Sime Fantela; (Spain) Roberto 'Chuny' Bermúdez de Castro; (Spain) Luis Doreste; (France) Loïck Peyron; (United Kingdom) Iain Percy; (United Kingdom) Ian Williams; (United Kingdom) Paul Goodison; (Germany) Jochen Schümann; (Germany) Markus Wieser; (Germany) Philipp Bühl; (Guatemala) Juan I. Maegeli; (Italy) Vasco Vascotto; (Italy) Francesco Bruni; (Italy) Diego Negri; (South Korea) Ha Jee-Min; (New Zealand) Rod Davis; (Italy) Diego Negri; (Peru) Stefano Peschiera; (Switzerland) Eric Monnin; (Sweden) Fredrik Lööf; (South Africa) Ian Ainslie; (United States) Dennis Conner; (United States) Paul Cayard; (Thailand) Noppakao Poonpat
- Parent organization: Sailing Athletes Foundation
- Affiliations: World Sailing
- Website: www.starsailors.com
- Remarks: The athletes are the Stars

The Star Sailors League (SSL) is a team-based sailing circuit in charge of the SSL Ranking, the SSL Circuit and the SSL Gold Cup.

== SSL Circuit ==
The global inshore sailing circuit launched by Olympic athletes in 2012. Supported by sailing stars such as Loïck Peyron and Dennis Conner (SSL honorary chairman), the SSL is recognized as "special event" by World Sailing since 2017. Its main philosophy considers the athletes (not the boats) as the "Stars". Its goals are:

- Showcase the annual global sailing championship with its 15,000 regattas on the example of the Calcio of football in Italy
- Determine and celebrate the world leaders in sailing
- Promote the inshore regattas to the global audience

The three main components of the SSL Circuit:

- SSL RANKING: Every Tuesday, the SSL updates and publishes the ranking of the 100,000 leading athletes of the SSL Circuit, thus highlighting the world's top inshore sailors. (The SSL Circuit = 15,000 regattas/year in more than 100 countries.)
- SSL FINALS: Every year around November–December, on the model of the yearly play-off in ice-hockey, the SSL organizes the annual final of the SSL Circuit among the 20 best athletes of the ranking, to crown the champion of the season.
- SSL GOLD CUP: Every two years, on the model of the football World Cup (or rugby or cricket, etc.), the SSL organizes the "ultimate" championship of the circuit among the 56 first nations of the ranking, to crown the best sailing nation.

== SSL Ranking ==
From 2019, a wide range of class race results will be gradually integrated into a weekly world ranking inspired by the ATP tennis ranking. At the end of the season, it will qualify the best in the world for the annual final of the circuit (with prize money), and every two years for the SSL Gold Cup. The SSL Global Ranking does not replace the rankings specific to each class but completes them, to offer a simple and attractive overview of inshore sailing to the general public; the SSL Global Ranking will bring together nearly 100,000 athletes in 2021 and will be used as a communication tool in 2019 to promote athletes and the sailing season.

=== SSL Global Ranking Method ===
==== Reference tables for allocation of points ====
===== Categories of events =====
Category	1	MAJOR	SSL 4000	Major event: Olympic Games, America's Cup, SSL Gold Cup & Finals
Category	2	WORLD	SSL 2500	World event : ^{a} World Championships (Fleet + Match Racing ( MR)), AC Challenger Selection Series; SSL Grand Slam (run on several classes since 2021)
Category	3	CONTINENTAL	SSL 1000	Continental event: ^{a+b} Continental Championships; ^{c} Continental Games; ^{d} Grand Prix I; WS World Cup; Regatta with 200 boats or more (Opti: 400 boats or more); MR-Grade W + 1
Category	4	INTERNATIONAL	SSL 500	International event: AC World Series; Olympic qualifier; Regional games (4–9 nations); ^{e} Grand Prix II; Regatta with 80 boats or more (Opti: 200 boats or more); MR-Grade 2
Category	5	NATIONAL	SSL 250	National regatta: ^{a} National championship; Local games (< 4 nations); ^{a} District championship; ^{f} Grand Prix III; Regatta with 30 boats or more; MR-Grade 3
Category	6	REGIONAL	SSL 100	Regional regatta: Regional regatta with 10 boats or more; MR-Grade 4
Category	7	LOCAL	SSL 10	Local regatta : Local regatta with a participation between 3 and 9 boats; MR-Grade 5

^{a} With the exception of MR & all Grand Prix, World + Continental + National Championships with less than 10 boats will be downgraded to the lower category

^{b} Continental: African-Asian-European-Oceania-South/American-North/American-Eastern/Hemisphere-Western/Hemisphere-Championships

^{c} Continental Games: African-Asian-Pacific-Pan American Games

^{d} Grand Prix I:

^{e} Grand Prix II: Sail GP, TP52 Super Series, RC44 Cup, GC32 Racing Tour, 18 Footers

^{f} Grand Prix III: D35, M32, TF35

===== Classes =====
Status	1	OLYMPIC CLASS	100%	Olympics + Particularities: 49^{er}, 49erFX, ILCA 7, ILCA 6, Nacra 17 Mixed, 470 Mixed + Current America's Cup Class + Match Racing Grade W + Grand Prix I
Status	2	WS CLASS	85%	Classes with Official Worlds: 5O5, Dragon, Hobie 16, J/70, Melges 24, Moth, Optimist, Snipe, Star, Sunfish, SSL 47, TP52, Grand Prix II & III, ... (~100 classes)
Status	3	OTHER CLASS	75%	All Other Classes : 1-Kronan, Albin Express, Folketboot, MC Scow, Naples Sabot, National 10, P-Boot, Sea Snark, Surprise,... (~ 5000 classes)

===== Types of competitions =====
Type	1	OPEN	100%	Olympic Classes ^{g}: 49^{er}FX, ILCA 6 Reserved for Women / 49^{er}, ILCA 7 Reserved for Men / Nacra 17, 470 for Mixed Teams
Type	1	OPEN	100%	America's Cup, SSL: Even if some America's Cup & SSL events require to be qualified to participate, all of them remain "Open" competitions
Type	2	NON-OPEN	40% ^{h}	Reserved for Specific Gender: Reserved for Women, or for Men, or for Mixed Teams
Type	2	NON-OPEN	40% ^{h}	Reserved for Age Groups: Reserved for Cadets, Juniors, Masters, Grand Masters, U20, U21, U23, U30, …
Type	2	NON-OPEN	40% ^{h}	Reserved for Other Groups: Reserved for Professionals or "Amateurs", or for Disableds, or for Owners

^{g} Competitions for Olympic or local Games qualification and for Olympic or local Games remain "Open" competitions

^{h} Competitions that add 2 (or more) of particular types (eg Juniors + Girls) get 20% of the points

===== Time validity of points =====
Due to the exceptional situation that occurred for COVID-19, the SSL Management Board decided to change the "Time Validity Points" rule, starting from December 15, 2020, until July 31, 2023.

Time	1	RECENT	100%	Recent event: Event ended in the last 104 weeks
Time	2	MID-TERM	50%	Mid-term event ^{i}: Event ended between 105 and 156 weeks ago
Time	3	HISTORICAL	0%	Historical event: Event ended more than 156 weeks ago

^{i} For the Olympic Games, for the AC Qualifiers and for the America's Cup, the 50% rule continues until the next edition (not only 156 weeks ago)

Starting from August 1, 2023, the "Time Validity Points" will return to the usual one (see table below):

Time	1	RECENT	100%	Recent event: Event ended in the last 52 weeks
Time	2	MID-TERM	50%	Mid-term event ^{i}: Event ended between 53 and 104 weeks ago
Time	3	HISTORICAL	0%	Historical event: Event ended more than 104 weeks ago

^{i} For the Olympic Games and for the America's Cup, the 50% rule continues until the next edition (not only 104 weeks ago)

==== SSL Ranking Points example: Optimist World Championship – A 4-Step Process ====
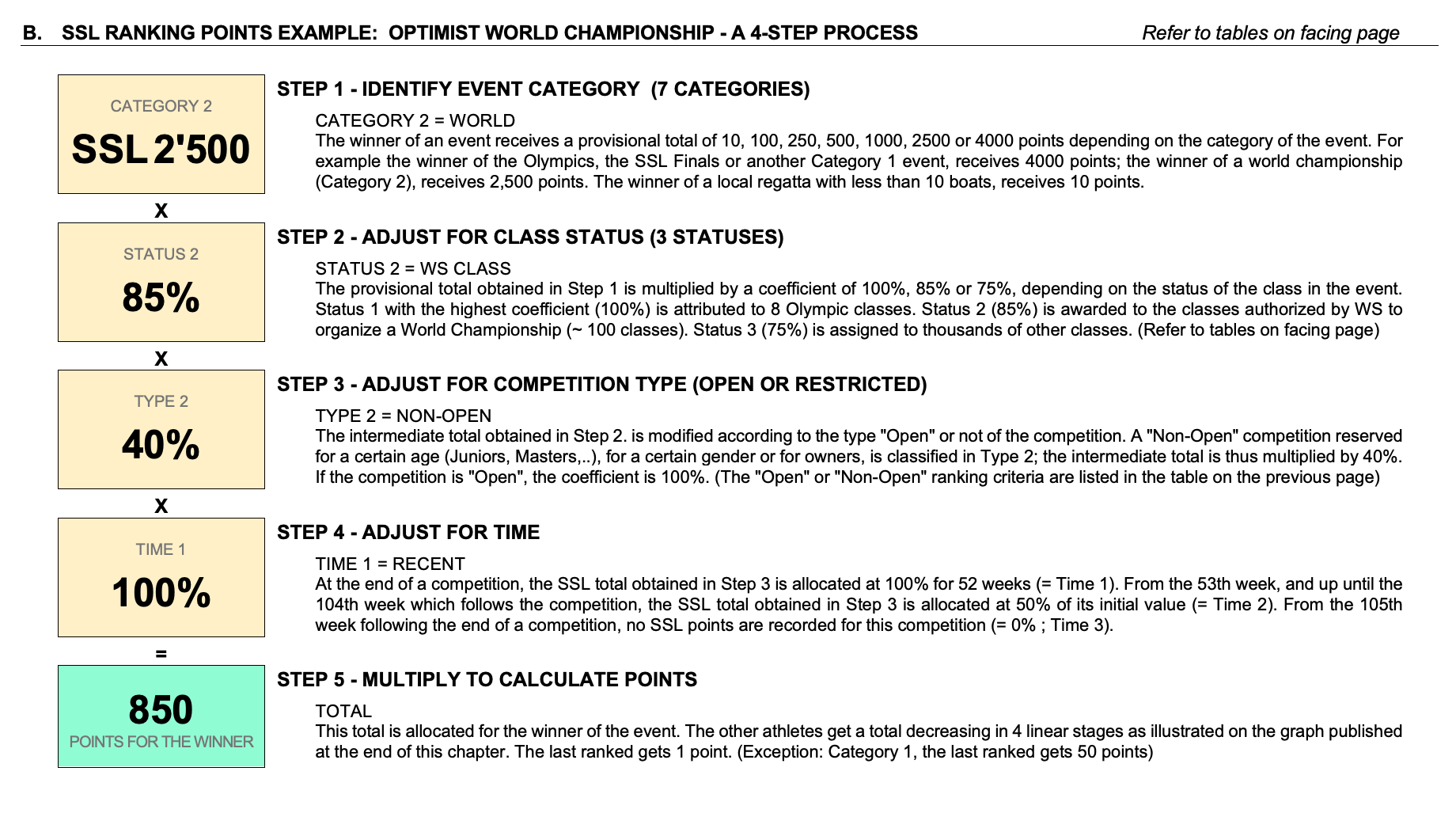

==== Examples of SSL Points allocated to 6 World Championships ====
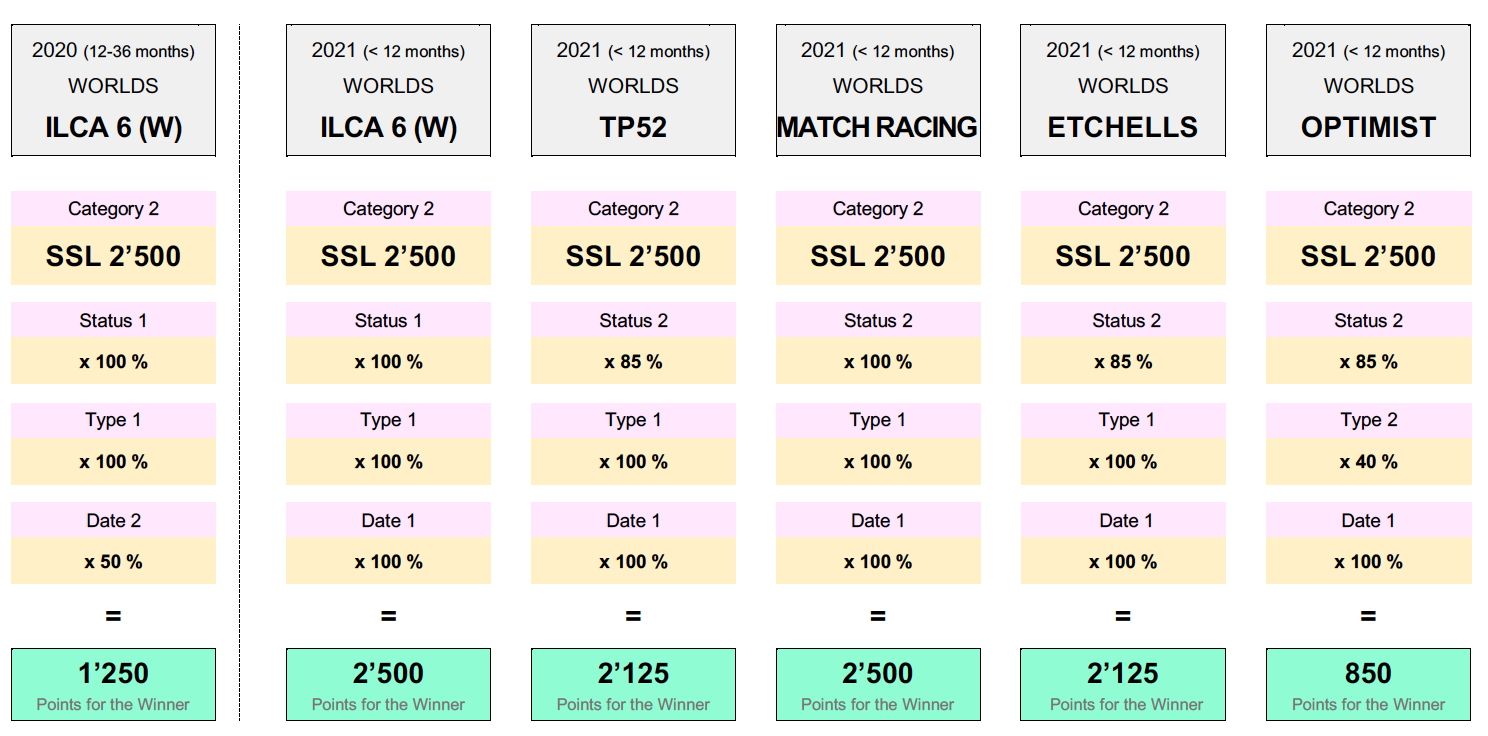

==== Comparison of SSL Scores allocated to the 7 categories of regattas ====
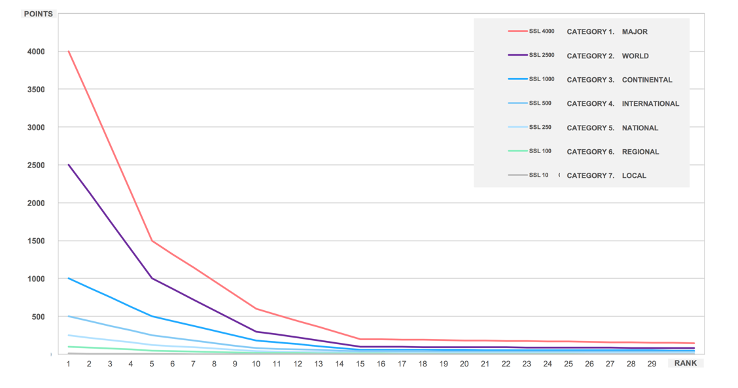

==== SSL Global Ranking: Principles ====
1. Fundamental points
  1. Origin
    - The SSL Global Ranking was conceived and continue to be developed by a group of Olympic and amateur sailors.
  2. Philosophy
    - SSL Global Ranking aims first and foremost to offer the first transversal and global ranking of inshore sailors, in complement to all national or international Class Ranking established by the classes and federations.
  3. Goals
    - The SSL Global Ranking aims to represent a reference and an attractive tool of communication used to:
      - Select sailors for the SSL Finals and for the teams in the SSL Gold Cup
      - Promote sailors and their skills
      - Expand the audience of sailing
2. Technical features
  1. 6 Best Scores
    - The SSL Ranking takes in consideration the best 6 scores of each athlete in the last 156 weeks (note: from January 1, 2023, the "Time Validity Points" rules will return to the usual one, i.e. last 104 weeks).
    - Exception: All scores allocated for category 7 competitions are added up without any limitation of numbers
  2. All Rewarded
    - All athletes who have participated in one race receive point(s). The winner gets basically from 10 to 4000 points and the last ranked 1 point.
  3. Weekly Update
    - The SSL Global Ranking is updated weekly and published every Tuesday at www.starsailors.com/ranking.
  4. Filters
    - The SSL Global Ranking can be filtered according to 3 criteria:
      - By Gender (Men – Women – Open/Global)
      - By Class of boats
      - By Nation
  5. Skipper & Crew
    - The SSL Global Ranking produces 2 distinct Rankings:
      - The SSL "Skipper" Global Ranking
      - The SSL "Crew" Global Ranking
    - Note: The "Skipper" designation used generically throughout this document refers specifically and only to the "Helmsman".
3. Eligibility – Integration – Evolution
  1. Eligibility: Athletes
    - All athletes without any restrictions (age, sex, status) who are on an official regatta ranking and who have finished at least one full race, may appear in the SSL Global Ranking.
  2. Eligibility: Events
    - All events which meet the criteria below can be integrated in the SSL Global Ranking:
      - Competition validated by a class recognized by World Sailing or by a National Association
      - Competition in real time (= no Ratings & Handicap Systems) with monotype boats or development sailing classes < 30 ff
      - Inshore competitions organized for a maximum period of 15 continuous days. (Exceptions: America's Cup and SSL GC)
  3. Integration steps
    - Weighting based on Event Category, World Sailing classes, open/restricted events:
      - Major events: (4) Olympic Games, America's Cup, SSL Gold Cup & Finals
      - Special events: (4) World Match Racing Tour (MR), ACWS, SailGP, SSL Grand Slams
      - Classes with Status 1 / Olympic Classes: (8) Finn, Laser (M), Laser (W), 49^{er}, 49^{er}FX, 470 (M), 470 (W) Nacra 17
      - Classes with Status 2 / WS Classes: (~100) 5O5, Dragon, Hansa 2.3, Etchells, J/70, Melges 24, Moth, TP52, Star, …
      - Classes with Status 3 / Other Classes: (~5000) Sabot, MC Scow, P-Boot, Sea Snark, Folketboot, Optimist, National 10, …
  4. Rules & evolution
    - The SSL Global Ranking rules are based on the rules that were used in a DEVELOPMENT PHASE from January 2013 to December 2018. During the development phase, to simplify development of the system only results from a single class were used.
    - The SSL Global Ranking will be in a TRANSITION PHASE until December 2021, as dozens of classes and thousands of athletes are added.
    - From 1 January 2022 forward, the SSL Global Ranking will be in its OPERATING PHASE. New classes will be added to the system only at the start of a calendar year, i.e. no new classes will be added during 2022.
4. SKIPPER / CREW – SCORING FEATURES
  1. "Skipper/Crew"
    - Rules The helmsman and each crew member from one team are awarded the same number of points.
    - All crew members of a team who have participated in one race receive the same number of points for the SSL "Crew" Global Ranking; this rule remains fixed, whatever the number of races sailed by each crew member and whatever the number of crew members having participated.
    - Only one helmsman per team and per event may receive points for the SSL "Skipper" Global Ranking.
    - An athlete cannot be awarded SSL points in the 2 categories if they have participated as a helmsman and as a crew member in the same event. In this case, only the SSL points which are allocated for their role as a crew member are retained.
    - The points awarded in each category ("Skipper" and "Crew" Member) cannot be added together.

=== SSL Nations Ranking Method ===
The SSL Nations Ranking takes in consideration:

- The total points for each Nation are given by the sum of the position in the global ranking of the top 5 skippers + 2 crews.
- If there is a score tie between two or more Nations, the tie shall be broken in favor of the Nation with its top skipper in the highest position in the Skipper Global Ranking.

The SSL Nations Ranking is updated and published on the 10th of each month.

=== Statistics ===
==== Number one ranked sailors ====
The following is a list of sailors who have achieved the number one position in the SSL ranking since the inception of the rankings in 2013 for Men and in 2020 for Women:

Men – Skipper
No.	Sailor	Date reached	consecutive weeks	Total weeks
1	(New Zealand) Peter Burling	December 10, 2019	129	129
2	(Italy) Diego Negri	July 8, 2014	52	126
4	(France) Xavier Rohart	September 10, 2013	36	72
3	(Brazil) Robert Scheidt	January 1, 2013	26	58
5	(United States) George Szabo	December 8, 2015	40	40
6	(Norway) Eivind Melleby	March 12, 2019	30	30
7	(United States) Mark Mendelblatt	July 7, 2015	22	22
8	(United Kingdom) Iain Percy	January 29, 2013	13	13
9	(Croatia) Tonči Stipanović	May 31, 2022	6	6
10	(United States) Augie Diaz	December 5, 2017	1	1

Women – Skipper
No.	Sailor	Date reached	consecutive weeks	Total weeks
1	(Netherlands) Marit Bouwmeester	June 9, 2020	61	61
2	(Denmark) Anne-Marie Rindom	August 10, 2021	31	46
3	(United Kingdom) Hannah Mills	January 1, 2020	22	22
4	(Brazil) Martine Grael	November 23, 2021	2	2

Men – Crew
No.	Sailor	Date reached	consecutive weeks	Total weeks
1	(Brazil) Bruno Prada	January 1, 2013	124	180
2	(New Zealand) Blair Tuke	December 10, 2019	135	135
3	(France) Pierre-Alexis Ponsot	March 14, 2017	38	51
4	(United States) Brian Fatih	September 15, 2015	31	43
5	(United States) Joshua Revkin	December 11, 2018	40	40
6	(Italy) Sergio Lambertenghi	December 6, 2016	14	23
7	(United Kingdom) Andrew Simpson	January 29, 2013	13	13
8	(Brazil) Henry Boening	September 17, 2019	12	12

Women – Crew
No.	Sailor	Date reached	consecutive weeks	Total weeks
1	(Brazil) Kahena Kunze	January 1, 2020	35	66
2	(United Kingdom) Anna Burnet	August 10, 2021	48	48
3	(Australia) Lisa Darmanin	August 11, 2020	17	17

==== Year-end number one sailor ====
Men – Skipper
Year	Sailor
2013	(Brazil) Robert Scheidt
2014	(Italy) Diego Negri
2015	(United States) George Szabo
2016	(Italy) Diego Negri
2017	(France) Xavier Rohart
2018	(Italy) Diego Negri
2019	(New Zealand) Peter Burling
2020	(New Zealand) Peter Burling
2021	(New Zealand) Peter Burling

Women – Skipper
Year	Sailor
2020	(Netherlands) Marit Bouwmeester
2021	(Denmark) Anne-Marie Rindom

Men – Crew
Year	Sailor
2013	(Brazil) Bruno Prada
2014	(Brazil) Bruno Prada
2015	(Brazil) Bruno Prada
2016	(Italy) Sergio Lambertenghi
2017	(France) Pierre-Alexis Ponsot
2018	(United States) Joshua Revkin
2019	(New Zealand) Blair Tuke
2020	(New Zealand) Blair Tuke
2021	(New Zealand) Blair Tuke

Women – Crew
Year	Sailor
2020	(Brazil) Kahena Kunze
2021	(United Kingdom) Anna Burnet

==== Countries with Number one ranked sailors ====
Men – Skipper
No.	Country	Number of Number One	Sailor(s)
1	United States	3	Mark Mendelblatt, George Szabo, Augie Diaz
2	Brazil	1	Robert Scheidt
2	France	1	Xavier Rohart
2	Great Britain	1	Iain Percy
2	Italy	1	Diego Negri
2	New Zealand	1	Peter Burling
2	Norway	1	Eivind Melleby
2	Croatia	1	Tonči Stipanović

Women – Skipper
No.	Country	Number of Number One	Sailor(s)
1	Great Britain	1	Hannah Mills
1	Netherlands	1	Marit Bouwmeester
1	Denmark	1	Anne-Marie Rindom
1	Brazil	1	Martine Grael

Men – Crew
No.	Country	Number of Number One	Sailor(s)
1	Brazil	2	Henry Boening, Bruno Prada
1	United States	2	Brian Fatih, Joshua Revkin
3	France	1	Pierre-Alexis Ponsot
3	Great Britain	1	Andrew Simpson
3	Italy	1	Sergio Lambertenghi
3	New Zealand	1	Blair Tuke

Women – Crew
No.	Country	Number of Number One	Sailor(s)
1	Brazil	1	Kahena Kunze
1	Australia	1	Lisa Darmanin
1	Great Britain	1	Anna Burnet

==== Number one country in the SSL Nations Ranking ====
SSL Nations Ranking
No.	Sailor	Date reached	consecutive months	Total months
1	Australia	September 10, 2020	11	11
2	Great Britain	September 10, 2021	11	11
3	Spain	August 10, 2021	1	1

== SSL Finals ==
=== SSL Finals ===
Year	First	Second	Third
2013 Nassau	Brazil; Robert Scheidt; Bruno Prada	Poland; Mateusz Kusznierewicz; Dominik Życki	United States; Mark Mendelblatt; Brian Fatih
2014 Nassau	United States; Mark Mendelblatt; Brian Fatih	Sweden; Fredrik Lööf; Anders Ekström	Poland; Mateusz Kusznierewicz; Dominik Życki
2015 Nassau	United States; George Szabo III; Edoardo Natucci	New Zealand; Hamish Pepper; Bruno Prada	France; Xavier Rohart; Pierre-Alexis Ponsot
2016 Nassau YC	United States; Mark Mendelblatt; Brian Fatih	France; Xavier Rohart; Pierre-Alexis Ponsot	Brazil; Robert Scheidt; Henry Raul Boening
2017 Nassau YC	Great Britain; Paul Goodison; Frithjof Kleen	Brazil; Robert Scheidt; Henry Raul Boening	United States; Mark Mendelblatt; Brian Fatih
2018 Nassau YC	Brazil; Jorge Zarif; Pedro Trouche	Brazil; Robert Scheidt; Henry Raul Boening	Italy; Diego Negri; Frithjof Kleen
2019 Nassau YC	Great Britain; Iain Percy; Anders Ekström	France; Xavier Rohart; Pierre-Alexis Ponsot	Norway; Eivind Melleby; Joshua Revkin

==== Multiple medallists ====
#	Athlete	Country	Gold	Silver	Bronze	Total
1	Mark Mendelblatt; Brian Fatih	United States	2	0	1	3
2	Robert Scheidt	Brazil	1	2	1	4
3	Bruno Prada	Brazil	1	1	0	2
3	Anders Ekström	Sweden	1	1	0	2
5	Xavier Rohart; Pierre-Alexis Ponsot	France	0	2	1	3
5	Henry Raul Boening	Brazil	0	2	1	3
7	Mateusz Kusznierewicz; Dominik Życki	Poland	0	1	1	2

=== SSL Grand Slams ===
==== SSL Lake Grand Slams ====
Year	First	Second	Third
2015 Grandson	United States; George Szabo III; Patrick Ducommun	Germany; Robert Stanjek; Frithjof Kleen	United States; Mark Mendelblatt; Brian Fatih

==== SSL City Grand Slams ====
Year	First	Second	Third
2016 Hamburg	France; Xavier Rohart; Pierre-Alexis Ponsot	Norway; Eivind Melleby; Joshua Revkin	Poland; Mateusz Kusznierewicz; Dominik Życki

==== SSL Breeze Grand Slams ====
Year	First	Second	Third
2019 Riva del Garda	Brazil; Robert Scheidt; Henry Raul Boening	France; Xavier Rohart; Pierre-Alexis Ponsot	United States; Paul Cayard; Arthur Lopes

== SSL Gold Cup ==
The SSL Gold Cup has the recognition of World Sailing as an official World cup of nations and will proclaim for the first time in Gran Canaria the best country in this sport. Announced at the 2018 Yacht Racing Forum by SSL Gold Cup Sport Director Mateusz Kusznierewicz as the SSL Nations Gold Cup, it was officially launched in 2019 at the Olympic Museum in Lausanne as a biennial event, to be hosted for the first time by the Cercle de la Voile de Grandson in Switzerland during September and October 2021. Suspended by the COVID-19 pandemic, the first edition finals were changed to October 28 – November 20, 2022 at Bahrain, but were postponed, and will be sailed November 10 – December 3, 2023 at the Canary Islands. 40 teams will compete in the SSL Gold Cup Finals, including the world's top 24 sailing nations in the SSL Ranking, plus the 16 teams who came through the Qualifying Series, held from May to July 2022 amog teams placed 25 to 56. The conditions will be the same for all teams, with identical SSL47 boats (a modified RC44) and training made available free of charge to all teams.
