= Royal Madras Yacht Club =

Yacht club located in Chennai, India

Coordinates: 13.0917°N 80.2934°E

- Club badge

- The club burgee features the Imperial Crown and a palm tree
- Founded: 1911; 115 years ago
- Location: Chennai, India
- Website: rmycindia.com

The Royal Madras Yacht Club (RMYC) is a yacht club in Chennai, India. The RMYC was founded by Sir Francis Spring in 1911. It was the first sailing club in southern India, and was originally based in what was called the Timber Pond area of Madras Harbour. Soon after its founding the club was granted royal patronage by George V, and it became one of the most prestigious sporting and social clubs in British India. Today the club is located at Springhaven Wharf, named after its founder.

== History ==
Sporting sailing in the area first started in Ennore, situated north of Madras, in the early 1900s. Sir Francis Spring, the first Chairman of the Madras Port Trust, founded the Royal Madras Yacht Club in 1911. The first of the Inter-Club Regattas in India was held in 1924 between the Royal Colombo Yacht Club and the RMYC in Madras. It was accorded its 'Royal' status by the Emperor of India, King George V, and the name was changed to The Royal Madras Yacht Club on 8 June 1933. The popular class at that time was the Bembridge. The club quickly gained a reputation for its formal atmosphere and it became one of the leading sporting social clubs in the country. After a number of re-locations, the club is situated at its original premises selected by its founder, which has come to be known as the Springhaven Wharf.

Recent decades have seen the facilities of the club improved and modernised. The then Chief of Naval Staff, Admiral Radhakrishna Hariram Tahiliani, inaugurated the new Club House on 4 February 1987. The club was affiliated to the Yachting Association of India after the YAI was formed in 1960 and many national sailing events have since been held at the club. The club conducted many regattas in Chennai between 1961 and 1981, including the Madras Port Centenary Regatta in 1971. From 1963 to 1971, The Royal Madras Yacht Club conducted the Inter Club Regatta for the Yachting Association of India and in 1963 the club were runners-up. In 1971, the Club won both the individual and team events. At the international level, club members Deep Rekhi, Kuruvilla Abraham, Drona Narayanan, Navaz Currimbhoy, Sandeep Srikanth, Niloufer Jamal, Rohit Ashok and Varun Prabhakar represented India between 1970 and 2000. During the 2004 Indian Ocean earthquake and tsunami, the club lost 12 boats and its facilities were badly damaged.

== Current ==
The club claims that its primary purpose is "to promote the sport of sailing" in all its aspects, and caters for sailors of all ages and abilities. It continues to provide facilities for national and intentional sailing events, in part due to the good sailing conditions off the coast of Chennai. The RMYC has a fleet of boats comprising Optimists, Lasers, Enterprise, Waterwags, 420 Class, 29ers, Omega and Seabirds. The club has recently acquired a fleet of J80 boats which is the first in India.

== Achievements ==
- In October 2025, RMYC sailor Mohammed Asif, sailing with skipper Luke Lawrence, won the Star Vintage Gold Cup held at Richland, Michigan. They both received the gold laurel wreath honor associated with winning the championship.
- Chinna Reddy and Yakubu Yakobu Kalaga (honorary member) won the gold medal in the Hobie 16 class at the 2015 Sail the Gulf International Regatta, held in Doha, Qatar.
- The 420 Nationals held in 2008 and 2009.
- The 420 and 470 National Championships were held at the club in 2010 as part of its Centenary Regatta.
- In January 2004, Rohini Rau won a gold medal in sailing for India at the Asian Sailing Championship held at Mumbai, India.
- Zephra Currimbhoy won the Invitation Cup at the Mumbai Regatta and has represented India in international sailing competitions, including the Asian Games.
- Ajay Rau competed on the yacht, Merit, in the Rolex Sydney to Hobart Yacht Race and was reported to be the first Indian sailor to take part in the event.

== Patrons ==
The chairman, deputy chairman and the Port Conservator of Chennai Port Trust are the patrons of the club.
