= Mohammed Asif (sailor) =

Indian sailor and researcher

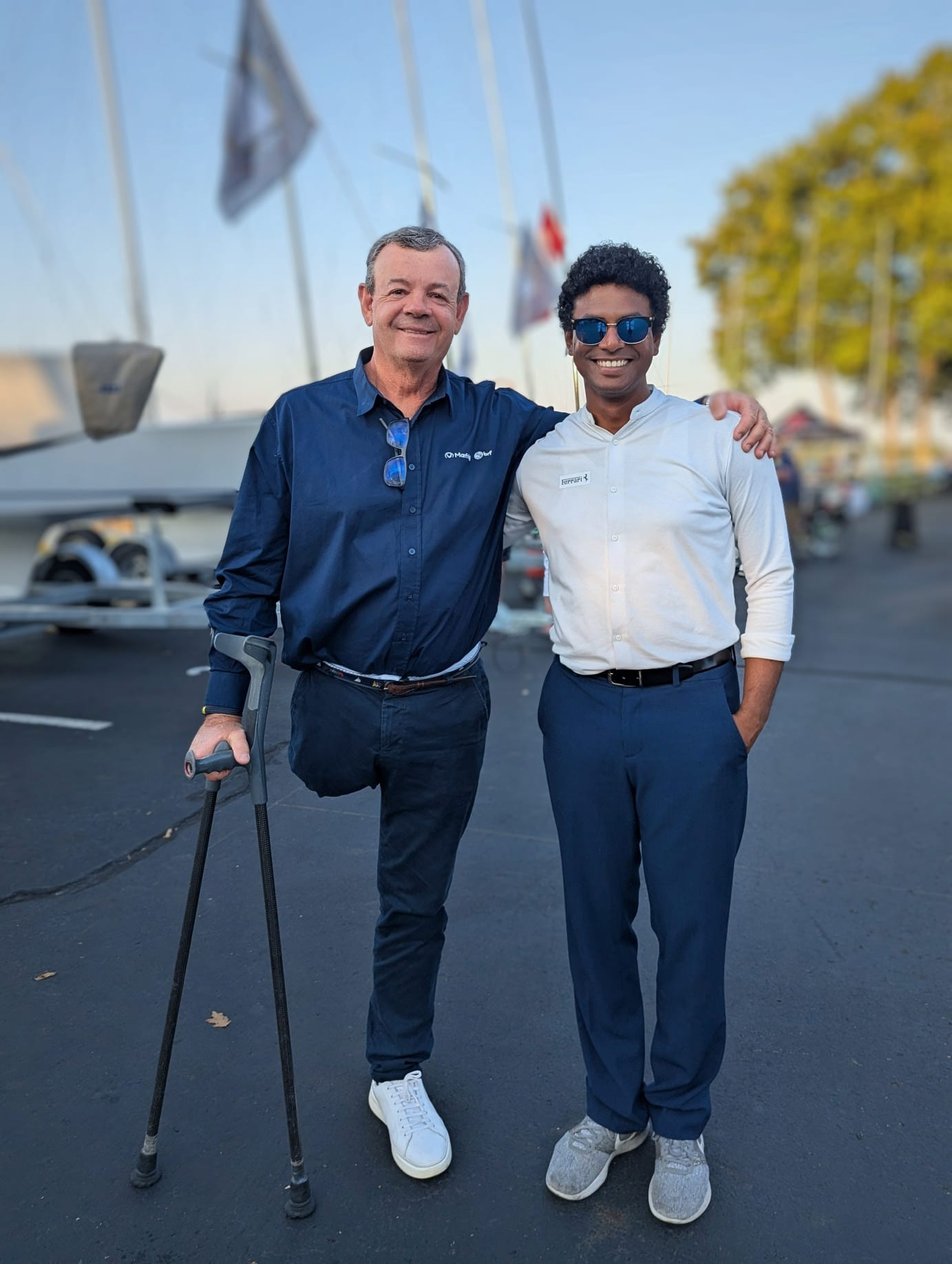
- Lars and Asif (right) at the Star Vintage Gold Cup 2025.

Personal information
- Full name: Mohammed Asif
- Nationality: India
- Born: 12 September 1994 (age 31)
- Education: Western Michigan University (PhD*); Pennsylvania State University (MS); Sathyabama University (BE)

Sailing career
- Sport: Sailing
- Club: Royal Madras Yacht Club
- Classes: Star, 470, 29er
Medal record
Star Vintage Gold Cup
Gold medal – first place	Star Vintage Gold Cup (2025)	Star
National Championships
Silver medal – second place	29er Coastal Nationals (2014)	29er
District Championships
Bronze medal – third place	Star District 4 (2025)	Star
Bronze medal – third place	Star District 12 (2024)	Star

Mohammed Asif (born 12 September 1994) is an Indian sailor who won the Star Vintage Gold Cup in 2025 with American skipper Luke Lawrence. Asif is a recipient of the Gold Laurel Wreath awarded to winners of the Star Vintage Gold Cup. He is a member of the Royal Madras Yacht Club and has competed internationally in the Star class.

In addition to his sailing career, Asif has conducted academic research in the field of electric propulsion, with work involving plasma diagnostics and gridded ion thruster systems for small spacecraft. His research has been presented at the International Electric Propulsion Conference and documented in peer-reviewed conference proceedings.

== Sailing career ==
Asif was introduced to sailing at the Royal Madras Yacht Club in late 2012, where he began competing in high-performance dinghy classes, as described by Royal Sails magazine. He progressed rapidly through competitive sailing, reaching the podium at the 2014 29er Coastal Nationals Championship in Chennai, India, where he finished second.

Following his early success in high-performance dinghy sailing, Asif placed competitive sailing on hold to pursue graduate studies and research. He later returned to international competition in the Star class, including participation at the 2022 Star World Championship in Marblehead, Massachusetts.

In 2025, Asif won the Star Vintage Gold Cup with American skipper Luke Lawrence at Gull Lake, Michigan. The pair finished ahead of a competitive fleet that included two-time Olympic bronze medalist Lars Grael and his crew, Marco Lagoa. The victory, achieved in challenging conditions, was described by Royal Sails as a breakthrough performance in the Vintage Star fleet. As the event winner, Asif was awarded the Gold Laurel Wreath, an honor traditionally presented to winners of the Star Vintage Gold Cup.

== Results ==
Year	Event	Venue	Result	Partner	Class	Ref
2026	Star Western Hemisphere Championship	Gull Lake (Richland), Michigan, United States	13th	Doug Smith	Star	
2025	Star Vintage Gold Cup	Gull Lake (Richland), Michigan, United States	1st	Luke Lawrence	Star	
2025	Star District 4 Championship (Crescent One Design Regatta)	Grosse Pointe, Michigan, United States	3rd	Richard Wilbur	Star	
2024	Star Vintage Gold Cup	Gull Lake (Richland), Michigan, United States	30th	Megan Rakoczy	Star	
2024	Star District 12 Championship	Geneva, New York, United States	3rd	Richard Burgess	Star	
2024	Star World Championship	San Diego, California, United States	60th	Megan Rakoczy / Lee Hope	Star	
2024	Star Eastern Hemisphere Championship	Eckernförde, Germany	29th	Christopher Wenzke	Star	
2024	Star Western Hemisphere Championship	Miami, Florida, United States	30th	John Rogers	Star	
2024	Bacardi Cup	Miami, Florida, United States	64th	Megan Rakoczy	Star	
2023	Star Western Hemisphere Championship	Cleveland, Ohio, United States	21st	Kieran Sweeny	Star	
2022	Star Vintage Gold Cup	Gull Lake (Richland), Michigan, United States	17th	Richard Burgess	Star	
2022	Star World Championship	Marblehead, Massachusetts, United States	82nd	Eric Larsen	Star	
2014	29er Coastal National Championship	Chennai, India	2nd	Praveen Prabhakar	29er	

== Research Career ==
Mohammed Asif
- Scientific career
- Fields: Electric propulsion; Plasma diagnostics; Gridded ion thruster
- Workplaces: Western Michigan University; Pennsylvania State University

Asif has conducted academic research in the field of electric propulsion, with a focus on miniature gridded ion thruster systems for small spacecraft applications. His early work at Pennsylvania State University examined the development and experimental testing of a microwave electron cyclotron resonance (ECR) discharge ion thruster, including plasma generation and ion beam extraction. Experimental diagnostics used in this work included Langmuir probe measurements and a Faraday cup for beam current and current-density measurements, which were used to support calculated performance estimates.

His later work at Western Michigan University has focused on preparation for long-duration testing of a miniature microwave-frequency ECR gridded ion thruster, including development of system stability practices and grid-manufacturing approaches intended to support wear testing. In 2025, his work reported recycle operations as a precursor to wear testing, combining Langmuir probe measurements with observations of changes in grid geometry and mass associated with repeated restart cycling.
