= Mauricio Bueno =

Brazilian sailor, lawyer, and former administrative judge

Maurício Bueno
Personal information
- Full name: Maurício De Carvalho Silveira Bueno
- Nationality: Brazil

Sailing career
- Sport: Sailing
- Class(es): Star, Finn
Medal record
Star Vintage Gold Cup
Gold medal – first place	Star Vintage Gold Cup (2023)	Star
Continental Championships
Gold medal – first place	Western Hemisphere Championship (2024)	Star
Gold medal – first place	South American Championship (2023)	Star
Gold medal – first place	South American Championship (2017)	Star

Maurício de Carvalho Silveira Bueno is a Brazilian competitive sailor, lawyer, and former administrative judge.

He competes in the Star class and is a recipient of the Star Class Gold Laurel Wreath honor after winning the Star Vintage Gold Cup in 2023 with Brazilian Olympic sailor Lars Grael.

== Sailing career ==
In 2017, Bueno won the Star South American Championship as crew alongside Marcelo Bellotti.

In 2023, Bueno won the Star South American Championship for a second time, sailing with Lars Grael.

Later in 2023, Bueno won the Star Vintage Gold Cup as crew alongside Lars Grael. He was awarded the Star Class Gold Laurel Wreath honor for winning the Star Vintage Gold Cup.

In 2024, Bueno won the Star Western Hemisphere Championship with Tomas Hornos.

== Legal career ==
Bueno is a Brazilian lawyer specializing in tax law and tax litigation. He has over 25 years of experience in the tax field and is particularly known for his work in contentious tax matters.

He served for six years as an administrative judge at the São Paulo State Tax Court, during which time he continued his work as a partner at his law firm. While serving as an administrative judge, he was involved primarily in cases concerning indirect taxation, including matters related to ICMS.

Bueno has been recognized by international legal directories for his work in tax controversy and tax litigation, including listings by Chambers Global, Chambers Brazil, ITR World Tax, and the Tax Expert Guide.

== Results ==
=== Vintage Gold Cup ===
Year	Event	Venue	Result	Partner	Class	Ref
2023	Star Vintage Gold Cup	Gull Lake, Michigan, United States	1st	(Brazil) Lars Grael	Star	

=== Contitnental Championships ===
Year	Event	Venue	Result	Partner	Class	Ref
2024	Star Western Hemisphere Championship	Miami, Florida, United States	1st	(United States) Tomas Hornos	Star	
2023	Star South American Championship	South America	1st	(Brazil) Lars Grael	Star	
2017	Star South American Championship	South America	1st	(Brazil) Marcelo Bellotti	Star	
