= 2005 Star World Championships =

The 2005 Star World Championships were held in Buenos Aires, Argentina during February 12-18, 2005.

== Results ==
Results of individual races
Pos	Crew	Country	I	II	III	IV	V	VI	Pts
Gold medal	Xavier Rohart (H); Pascal Rambeau	France	6	1	3	2	2	2	10.0
Silver medal	Torben Grael (H); Marcelo Ferreira	Brazil	1	6	8	1	4	3	15.0
Bronze medal	Iain Percy (H); Steve Mitchell (sailor)	Great Britain	DNF	2	2	13	1	1	19.0

Legend: DNF – Did not finish; DNS – Did not start; DSQ – Disqualified; PMS – Premature start; RET – Retired; YMP – Yacht materially prejudiced;
