= Star North American Championship =

Star North American Championship are annual North American Championship sailing regattas in the Star class organised by the International Star Class Yacht Racing Association.

== Editions ==
Year	City	Country	Dates	Athletes	Nations	Note
1939	Treasure Island	United States				
1948	Puget Sound	United States				
1952	Toronto	Canada				
1953	Milwaukee	United States				
1954	Rockport	United States				
1955	Rye	United States				
1956	Vermilion	United States				
1957	Newport Beach	United States				
1958	Choptank River	United States				
1959	Chicago	United States				
1960	Milford	United States				
1961	Toronto	Canada				
1962	Puget Sound	United States				
1963	Rye	United States				
1964	Galveston Bay	United States				
1965	Oxford	United States				
1966	Cleveland	United States				
1967	Toronto	Canada				
1968	San Francisco	United States				
1969	Chicago	United States				
1970	Rockport	United States				
1971	Biscayne Bay	United States				
1972	Toronto	Canada				
1973	Chesapeake Bay	United States				
1974	Cleveland	United States				
1975	Mobile Bay	United States				
1976	Boston	United States				
1977	San Diego	United States				
1978	Toronto	Canada				
1979	English Bay	Canada				
1980	Milford	United States				
1981	Galveston Bay	United States				
1982	Wilmette	United States				
1983	Cleveland	United States				
1984	Westport	United States				
1985	San Diego	United States				
1986	Cleveland	United States				
1987	Milford	United States				
1988	Ithaca	United States				
1989	English Bay	Canada				
1990	Winthrop	United States				
1991	Wilmette	United States	6–14 September			
1992	Grosse Pointe	United States				
1993	San Diego	United States	22–27 August			
1994	Marblehead	United States	20–26 August			
1995	Galesville	United States	19–27 October			
1996	Wilmette	United States	6–13 September			
1997	Marina del Rey	United States				
1998	Northern Lake George	United States	26 September – 1 October			
1999	Winthrop	United States				
2000	Cleveland	United States	15–19 August			
2001	Milford	United States	26–31 August			
2002	Lake Sunapee	United States	8–14 June			
2003	San Francisco	United States	17–21 October			
2004	Winthrop	United States	22–25 August			
2005	Marina del Rey	United States	15–18 November			
2006	Miami	United States	14–19 November			
2007	Vancouver	Canada	1–4 August			
2008	Harbor Springs	United States	8–13 September			
2009	Westport	United States	15–18 September			
2010	Marina del Rey	United States	19–22 August			
2011	Tampa	United States	13–16 November			
2012	Hamilton	Canada	11–15 September			
2013	Newport Beach	United States	6–9 June			
2014	Oxford	United States	6–11 October			
2015	Seattle	United States	1–6 September			
2016	Chicago	United States	27 September – 2 October			
2017	Marblehead	United States	5–10 September			

== Medalists ==
Year	Gold	Silver	Bronze
1954 Rockport	United States; Jack Van Dyke; Not documented	Not documented	Not documented
2017 Marblehead	United States; Augie Diaz; Bruno Prada	United States; Luke Lawrence; Ian Coleman	United States; George Szabo; Ed Morey
