= Clinio Freitas =

Brazilian sailor (born 1964)

Personal information
- Born: 8 January 1964 (age 62)

Sport
- Country: Brazil
- Sport: Sailing
Medal record
Men's sailing
Representing Brazil
Olympic Games
Bronze medal – third place	1988 Seoul	Tornado

Clinio Freitas (born 8 January 1964) is a Brazilian sailor. He received a bronze medal in the Tornado Class at the 1988 Summer Olympics in Seoul, South Korea with Lars Grael.
