= Edward Spring =

Anglo-Irish clergyman

The Reverend Edward Spring (11 June 1808 – 29 April 1880) was an Anglo-Irish clergyman in the Church of Ireland, notable for his sermons and lectures on poor relief in Ireland.

Spring was born at the family home of The Point in Killarney, the son of Francis Spring, of Castlemaine and Catherine Fitzgerald. A descendant of Thomas Spring of Castlemaine, his family owned large estates in County Kerry. He graduated from Trinity College, Dublin in 1833.

Spring was ordained as a deacon on 30 November 1834 and became a priest exactly a year later, both at St Mary's Cathedral, Limerick. He was Curate of Killagha in 1834, Curate of Donneraile in 1835 and Curate of Killaconnenagha in 1837. In 1840 he was Curate of Dunnurlin, Curate of Tullagh in 1842 and in December 1849 became Curate of Cape Clear. Spring was made Rector of Kilcoe and Clear in 1852 and in 1864 became Vicar of Aghadown. In 1871 he became Rector of Magourney and Kilcolman in the Diocese of Cork, Cloyne and Ross.

He became well known in the 1840s due to his passionate sermons regarding poverty alleviation and food provision. This was especially the case during and after the Great Famine of 1845–1852. As a result, Spring was invited to give lectures across the United Kingdom of Great Britain and Ireland about the Church's response to the disaster, many of which were later published and widely publicised by Purcell & Co. in Cork.

Spring married Arabella Matilda Rudkin on 19 December 1844. Together they had four children:

- Sir Francis Joseph Edward Spring
- Edward Maurice Day Spring
- Catherine Anne Spring
- Matilda Cecilia Spring

He died at Magourney in 1880 at the age of 72.
