= Xavier Rohart =

French sailor

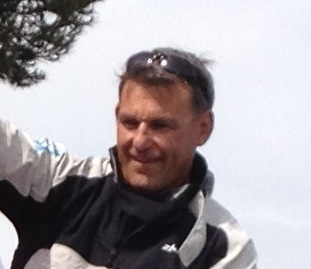

Medal record

Sailing

Representing France

Olympic Games
Bronze medal – third place	2004 Athens	Star class

World Championships
Gold medal – first place	2003 Cádiz	Star
Gold medal – first place	2005 Buenos Aires	Star
Silver medal – second place	2007 Cascais	Star
Bronze medal – third place	2002 Marina del Rey	Star
Bronze medal – third place	2006 San Francisco	Star

Xavier Charles René Rohart OLY (born 1 July 1968) is a French sailor. A member of the YC La Pelle in Marseille, he is now competing in the Star class. He won a bronze medal in the Star class with Pascal Rambeau at the 2004 Summer Olympics, and has also competed at four other Olympics. Born in Thionville, he is a two-time world champion and is a founder of the Star Sailors League. He now sails with Pierre-Alexis Ponsot.

== Records ==
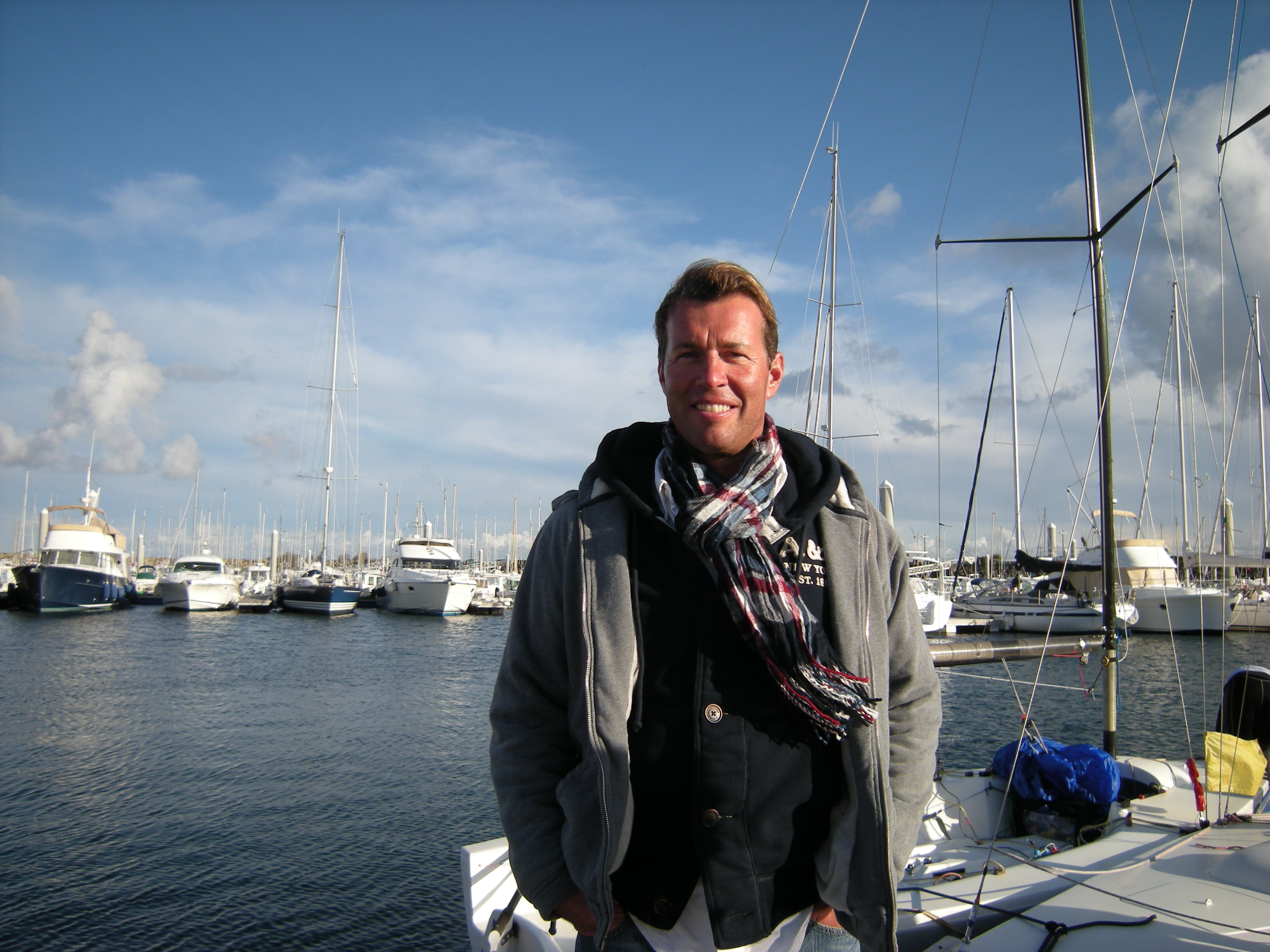
Pierre-Alexis Ponsot, crew of Xavier Rohart in Star at the Olympics 2012.

=== Olympic Games ===
- 6th at the 2008 Olympics in Beijing in Star with Pascal Rambeau.
- Bronze medal at the 2004 Olympics in Athens in Star with Pascal Rambeau.
- 5th at the 2000 Summer Olympics in Sydney in Finn.
- 7th at the 1992 Summer Olympics in Barcelona in Finn.

=== World Championship ===
- (gold) at the Star World Championship in 2003 and 2005
- (gold) at the J/80 World Championship in 2002
- (silver) World vice-champion in Star in 2007
- (bronze) Third in Star in 2002 et 2006
- (bronze) Third in Finn in 1997 and 1998

=== European Championship ===
- (gold) European champion in Star in 2015
- (silver) European vice-champion in Star in 2006
- (silver) European vice-champion in Finn in 1997

=== Star Sailors League Finals ===
- 6th at the Star Sailors League Finals 2014 in Nassau in Star.
- 6th at the Star Sailors League Finals 2013 in Nassau in Star.

== Distinction ==
- Elected Sailor of the year of the Fédération Française de Voile in 2003 with his crew Pascal Rambeau
