= J/22 World Championship =

Annual Sailing World Championship in the J/22 Class

The J/22 World Championship is an annual international sailing regatta for J/22 keelboats, organized by the host club on behalf of the J/22 Class Association and recognized by World Sailing, the sports IOC recognized governing body.

From 1990 to 1993 International J/22 Class Championship was held before getting recognition from World Sailing to hold a World Championship.

== Events ==
Edition			Host			Participation				Ref
Ed.	Date	Year	Host club	Location	Nat.	Boats	Sailors	Nat.	Cont.	Ref
1		1994		Annapolis	United States					
2		1995		Ouddorp	Netherlands					
3		1996		Fort Worth	United States					
4	22–29 March	1997	Royal Cape Yacht Club	Cape Town	South Africa					
5		1998		Punta Ala	Italy					
6	17–22 Aug.	1999		Cleveland	United States					
7	26 Aug. to 2 Sep.	2000	International Sailing Centre	Medemblik	Netherlands					
8	26 May to 1 June	2001	Algoa Bay Yacht Club	Gqeberha	South Africa					
9	7–12 Oct.	2002	Corpus Christi Yacht Club	Corpus Christi	United States					
10	12–19 Oct.	2003	Società Velica Barcola Grignano / Yacht Club Porto San Rocco	Muggia	Italy					
11	18–21 May	2004	Annapolis Yacht Club	Annapolis	United States					
12		2005		Medemblik	Netherlands					
13	30Jun −7Jul	2006	Yacht Club Crouesty Arzon	Arzon	France					
14	14–22 Dec.	2007	Point Yacht Club	Durban	South Africa					
15	18–24 Aug.	2008	Rochester Yacht Club	Rochester	United States					
16	13–20 June	2009	Fraglia Vela Riva	Riva del Garda	Italy					
17	26Jun −3Jul	2010	Regatta Centre Scheveningen	Scheveningen	Netherlands					
18	9–15 Oct.	2011	Southern Yacht Club	New Orleans	United States					
19	26–29 June	2012	Yacht Club Crouesty Arzon	Arzon	France					
20	1–5 Oct.	2013	Sail Newport	Newport	United States					
21	26 Apr. to 3 May	2014	Deneysville Aquatic Club	Deneysville	South Africa	43	134	3	3	
22	19–26 July	2015	Part of Travemünde Week	Travemünde	Germany					
23	19–24 Aug	2016	Canadian Olympic-training Regatta, Kingston	Kingston	Canada	41				
24	30 May to 4 June	2017		Scheveningen	Netherlands	39				
25	8–14 Sept.	2018	Annapolis Yacht Club	Annapolis	United States	64	102	3	2	
26	6–14 Jul	2019	Warnemünder Segel Club	Rostock	Germany	31	104	7	2	
N/A	27Jun −3Jul	2020	Point Yacht Club	Durban	South Africa	Delayed to 2022 due to COVID-19 pandemic				
28	17–21 July	2021	Corpus Christi Yacht Club	Corpus Christi	United States	42				
27	28 June to 3 July; Reschuduled 2020	2022	Point Yacht Club	Durban	South Africa	24	73	3	3	
29	14–22 July	2022	Corpus Christi Yacht Club	Corpus Christi	United States	26	80	4	2	
30	24–29 July	2023	Zürcher Yacht-Club / Travemünde Week	Travemünde	Germany	24	80	3	2	
31	19–26 Oct	2024	Eastport Yacht Club	Annapolis	United States	48				
32	Oct	2025		Naples	Italy	20	73	4	1	
33	5-10 Oct	2026	Southern Yacht Club	New Orleans	United States	46	142	4	2	

== Multiple World Champions ==
Compiled from the data below up to date including 2026.

Ranking	Sailor	Gold	Silver	Bronze	Total	No. Entries	Ref.
1	Jean-Michel Lautier (FRA)	3	2	0	5	6	
2	Denis Neves (NED)	3	1	0	4	5	
2	Giuseppe D'Aquino (NED)	3	1	0	4	5	
4	Nic Bol (NED)	2	1	2	5	6	
5	Paul Foerster (USA)	2	1	0	3	3	
5	Jackson Benvenutti (USA)	2	1	0	3	5	
7	Ian Ainslie (RSA)	2	0	2	4	4	
8	Michael Marshall (USA)	2	0	2	4	7	
9	David Rae (RSA)	2	0	0	2	6	

== World Championships ==
Year	Gold	Silver	Bronze	Ref.
1994	USA 479 – Osama Writing Instruments; Chris Larson (USA); Moose McClintock; Jon Rodgers; Renee Mehl	USA 161 - Exor; Peter Merrifield (USA); Unknown; Unknown	USA 751 - Panoramic View; Doug Clark (USA); Unknown; Unknown	
1995	Mark Neeleman (NED); Unknown; Unknown			
1996	Paul Foerster (USA); Unknown; Unknown		Jay Lutz (USA)	
1997	RSA 1239 (3) - Orion; Ian Ainslie (RSA); Rick Mayhew (RSA); Gary Sindler (RSA)	RSA (6) - Coronation; K Lambrecht (RSA)	RSA 1173 (1) - Orion Express (Tricky Dicky); David Hudson (RSA)	
1998	Marino Fassi (ITA); Unknown; Unknown	Lars Hansen (USA); Unknown; Unknown	Rob Johnston (USA); Unknown; Unknown	
1999	Mark Foster (USA); Unknown; Unknown			
2000	Serge Kats (NED); Jean-Pierre Martens (NED); Cees Scheurwater (NED)	Albert Kooijman (NED); Dolf Peet (NED); Robbert Baggers (NED)	Nic Bol (NED); Dennis Goethals (NED); Sanders Van Der Borch (NED)	
2001	RSA 1425 – Donna Mia Sempre (62) Ian Ainslie (RSA); Greg Davis (RSA); Charles Nankin (RSA)	RSA 1122 = Orion Express (39); Mark Sadler (RSA)	RSA 775 – Orion (32); Michael Giles (RSA)	
2002	Chunder Terry Flynn (USA); Randall Borges (USA); Paul Grenauer (USA)	Grumpy Old Men Bill Drahiem (USA); Scott Self (USA); Jim Bookhout (USA)	MSC Donna Mia Ian Ainslie (RSA); Greg Davis (RSA); Charles Nankin (RSA)	
2003	John Den Engelsman (NED); S. Machielsen; Unknown	Nic Bol (NED); Unknown; Unknown	Kim Christensen (DEN); Unknown; Unknown	
2004	47/ USA 1489 Alec Cutler (BER); Max Skelly (USA); Paul Murphy (USA)	02/ NED 1512 John Den Engelsman (NED); Unknown; Unknown	57/ USA 1467 David Van Cleef (USA); Unknown; Unknown	
2005	NED – Team Magic Marine Tjarco Timmermans (NED); Jurjen Feitsma (NED); Fanny van Leeuwen (NED); Ivan Peute (NED)	John Den Engelsman (NED)	Nic Bol (NED)	
2006	NED 1333 – Team Branche Bureau Jeroen Den Boer (NED); Truus Vissia (NED); Martijn Punt (NED); Sanne Botterweg (NED)	NED 479 - Witte PIJL Huid Bannier (NED); Paul Manuel (NED); Jaan Willem Landre (NED)	NED 1399 - Team Magic Marine Tjarco Timmermans (NED); Ivan Peute (NED); Jurjen Feitsma (NED); Fanny Van Leeuwen (NED)	
2007	Mark Sadler (RSA); Unknown; Unknown	Jeroen Den Boer (NED); Unknown; Unknown	Ian Ainslie (RSA); Unknown; Unknown	
2008	What Kinda Gone Greg Fisher (USA); Unknown; Unknown	bob's yer grandaddy Anthony Kotoun (ISV); Unknown; Unknown	Team Traffic Flip Wehrheim (USA); Unknown; Unknown	
2009	NED 1541 Gaston Loos (NED); Maarten Innemee (NED); Johanna Innemee (NED); Gideon Mastenbroek (NED)	NED 1450; Ronald Veraar (NED); Robert Janssen; Unknown	NED 1609; Eelco Blok (NED); Unknown; Unknown	
2010	NED 1364 – Quantum Racing Nic Bol (NED); Unknown; Unknown	NED 1609 – Team Kesbeke Eelco Blok (NED); Unknown; Unknown	NED 1513 – Henri LLoyd John den Engelsman (NED); Unknown; Unknown	
2011	USA 203 – Dieselsnack Rob Johnston (USA); Unknown; Unknown	USA 1207 – thunderchicken Jim Barnash (USA); Gunnar Richardson (USA); Mark Sertl (USA)	USA 1586 – Dazzler Allan Terhune Jnr. (USA); Andrew Eagan (USA); Marcus Eagan (USA)	
2012	FRA 1476 – Julie Jean Queveau (FRA); Pierre Laouenan (FRA); Damien Iehl (FRA); Pierre Le Clainche (FRA)	NED 1591 – Henri Lloyd Wouter Kollmann (NED); Gilbert Figaroa (NED); Kim Plattoeul (NED); Nolwenn Blanchard (FRA)	NED 1600 – Thuishavens.nl Team Ivo Kok (NED); Gerrie Gortzak (NED); Remco Van Den Berg (NED)	
2013	03 / USA 1586 – Dazzler Allan Terhune (USA); Katie Terhune (USA); Kristine Wake (USA); Marcus Eagan (USA)	18 / USA677 - ThreeDories.com Brad Julian (USA); Matthew Schubert (USA); Colin Robertson (USA)	42 / USA 707 - Tejas Mark Foster (USA); Brian Babbitt (USA); Matt Romberg (USA)	
2014	RSA 174 – Susie Too David Rae (RSA); Guido Verhovert (RSA); Trevor Spilhaus (RSA)	RSA 1169 – Rampent lll – 48 Henry Daniels (RSA); Andrea Giovanini (RSA); James Largier (RSA); Duncan Matthews (RSA)	CAY 1486 – Two Stroke – 18 Mike Farrington (CAY); Simon Farrington (CAY); Leanna Boura (CAY)	
2015	Chris Doyle (USA) Christopher Stressing (USA); Phillip Wehrheim (USA)	Jean-Michel Lautier (FRA) Peter Jensen (NED) Guiseppe D'Aquino (NED)	Reinerchri Brockerhoff (FRA) Christophe Declercq (FRA) Charles Michaux (FRA)	
2016	1578 - 7 Michael Marshall (USA) Luke Lawrence (USA); Todd Hiller (USA)	1649 - 17; Christopher Doyle (USA) Will Harris (USA); Adam Burns (USA)	1464 - 43; Jeffrey Todd (USA) Chip Carr (USA); Chris Ryan (USA)	
2017	NED 1609 - Quantum Holland Nic Bol (NED); Christopher Bol (NED); Tim De Weerdt (NED); Niels De Vries (NED)	NED 1273 – Fraporita Jean-Michel Lautier (FRA); Giuseppe D'Aquino (NED); Denis Neves (NED)	NED 1473 – Biertje Hans Duetz (NED); Andre Beijer (NED); Jan Bos (NED)	
2018	USA 1586 – Uncle Fluffy Zeke Horowitz (USA); Jackson Benvenutti (USA); Jo Ann Fisher (USA); Emmy Stuart (USA)	USA 1207 – Thunder Chicken Allan Terhune (USA); Skip Dieball (USA); Cate Muller (USA)	USA 1464 – Hot Toddy Jeffrey Todd (USA); Chip Carr (USA); Chris Ryan (USA)	
2019	NED 1273 - Fraporita Jean-Michel Lautier (NED); Denis Neves (NED); Giuseppe D'Aquino (NED)	FRA 1444 - Jazzy Reiner Brockerhoff (GER); Charles Michaux (FRA); Christophe Declercq (FRA)	CAN 1644 - Raised J Johan Koppernaes (CAN); Caroline Main (CAN); Mike Marshall (CAN); Michele Cimon (CAN)	
2021	24 / USA 24 - Schitzen Giggles Jeff Progelhof (USA); Paul Foerster (USA); Rod Favela (VEN)	42 / USA 1542 – Honeybadger Travis Odenbach (USA); Kristofer Werner (USA); Justin Damore (USA)	01 / USA 1586 – Pressure Drop Michael Marshall (USA); Zeke Horowitz (USA); Emmy Horowitz (USA); Jo Ann Fisher (USA)	
2022	USA 3379 – American Garage Mike Marshall (USA); Unknown; Unknown	19 / 1954 – Grand Slam 2 Paul Foerster (USA)	85 / 5185 – Siesta Nobuyuki Imai (JPN)	
2020/22	RSA 775 – Nitro Juice David Rae (RSA); Sean Van Rensburg (RSA); Siyanda Vato (RSA)	768 (28) – Running with Scissors Mike Farrington (CAY); Dre Giovannini (CAY); Joseph Palone (CAY)	1117 (35) – Da J Richard Weddell (RSA); Rudy McNeill (RSA); Struan Campbell (RSA)	
2023	NED 1273 Jean-Michel Lautier (NED); Giuseppe D'Aquino (NED); Denis Neves (NED)	GER 1472 Jürgen Eiermann (GER); Christian Fliegel (GER); Jens Hübner (GER)	GER 1513 Wolf Jeschonnek (GER); Frank Sturm (GER); Steffen Dülsen (GER)	
2024	USA 1542 – Honeybadger Travis Odenbach (USA); Geoff Becker (USA); Justin Damore (USA)	USA 1076 – Baby Doll Glenn Darden (USA); Willem Van Waay (USA); Jackson Benvenutti (USA); Jewel Kelly (USA)	USA 1344 – Cougar Will Welles (USA); Karl Anderson (USA); Luke Lawrence (USA)	
2025	NED 1273 – FRAPORITA Jean-Michel Lautier (NED); Giuseppe D'Aquino (NED); Denis Neves (NED)	GER 1411 – JOLA Andreas Dillmann (GER); Silke Basedow (GER); Harald Bruhn (GER)	GER 1449 – J-BENDER Thorsten Spotter (GER); Hannes Ranke (GER); Florian Buchs (GER)	
2026	1076 - Baby Doll Glenn Darden (USA); Min Min Kelly (USA); Willem Van Waay (USA); Jackson Benvenutti (USA)	1586 - Polar Express Jeff Hayden (USA); Steve Hayden (USA); Ian Hunter (USA)	16 - Defiance Mike Gemperline (USA); UNKNOWN; UNKNOWN	
