= Francis Spring =

Indian politician

The Honourable Sir Francis Spring KCIE
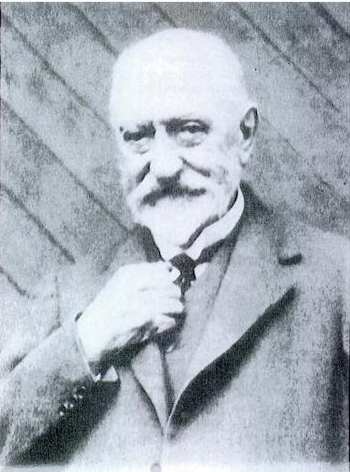

Member of the Imperial Legislative Council
- In office 1910–1913

Member of the Madras Legislative Council
- In office 1900–1901

Personal details
- Born: Francis Joseph Edward Spring; 20 January 1849 Baltimore, County Cork, United Kingdom of Great Britain and Ireland
- Died: 25 August 1933 (aged 84) Saint Aubin, Jersey, United Kingdom
- Education: Trinity College Dublin

Sir Francis Joseph Edward Spring KCIE FIMechE (20 January 1849 – 25 August 1933) was an Anglo-Irish civil engineer and member of the Imperial Legislative Council who played a pioneering role in development of the Indian Railways. Spring is largely remembered today for championing the cause of the Indian mathematician Srinivasa Ramanujan.

== Early life and education ==
Spring was born in Baltimore, County Cork, United Kingdom of Great Britain and Ireland on 20 January 1849 to Rev. Edward Spring and his wife Matilda. He was a descendant of the Spring family of County Kerry and a relation of Baron Monteagle of Brandon. Spring was educated at Midleton College and Trinity College Dublin.

== Career ==
Upon graduating from Trinity College Dublin with a licentiate in engineering, Spring entered the Indian Imperial Civil Service's engineering section in 1870. He served as Consulting Engineer to the Government of India and played a pivotal role in the development of railways in East India. He is credited with the construction of an acclaimed railway bridge across the Godavari River. He served as the Deputy Secretary to the Government of India, Under Secretary to the Government of Bengal and as the manager of the extensive East Coast Railway. He was also Secretary to the Government of Madras with responsibility for railways in the region. Spring was a regular contributor to engineering and India-focused journals throughout his career.

Upon leaving the civil service in 1904, Spring was appointed Chairman of the Madras Port Trust and served in that position until 1919. In this role, Spring redesigned and modernised the harbour at Madras, greatly increasing its capacity and improving the port's defences against cyclone damage. He was a member of the Madras Legislative Council between 1900 and 1901, and was a fellow of the University of Madras and the University of Calcutta. Between 1910 and 1913, he was a member of the Imperial Legislative Council of India.

=== Mentorship of Ramanujan ===
Indian mathematician Srinivasa Ramanujan worked as a Class III Grade IV clerk from 1912 to 1914 at the Madras Port Trust under Spring's chairmanship. Ramanujan's mathematical talents were brought to Spring's notice by his chief accountant S. Narayana Iyer. Soon, Spring developed an interest in him and lobbied for government support and sponsorship of his research studies in England. In part, this was achieved through regular correspondence with Sir Alfred Bourne.

== Personal life and later years ==
In 1873, Spring married Charlotte, the daughter of Mr Samuel Townsend JP. She died in 1930. Spring founded the Royal Madras Yacht Club in 1911, which still exists as the premier sailing club in India. He retired in 1919, shortly after his seventieth birthday. He left India and moved to Jersey in the Channel Islands, where he lived for the last fourteen years of his life. With a considerable personal fortune, he gave a large amount of money for restoration work on St Peter and St Paul's Church, Lavenham, his family's ancestral church, where he has a memorial. Spring died at Saint Aubin on 25 August 1933 at the age of 84.

== Honours ==
For his accomplishments, Spring was made a Companion of the Order of the Indian Empire in 1894 and appointed Knight Commander of the Order of the Indian Empire in 1911. He was a member of the Institution of Civil Engineers, Institute of Mechanical Engineers and American Society of Civil Engineers. In December 1901 he received the honorary degree of Master of Engineering from the University of Dublin. Spring was also the first person in Madras city to own a registered automobile. He was an honorary major in the South India Railway Volunteer Rifles.

A tug boat operating in Madras harbour is named Sir Francis Spring, as is the main road leading to the port, and the marina of the Royal Madras Yacht Club is called Springhaven.

== Cultural references ==
Spring was portrayed by Stephen Fry in the 2015 British biographical film The Man Who Knew Infinity, which recounts the story of Ramanujan's adult life and his career at Cambridge University. Spring was portrayed by Richard Walsh in the 2014 film Ramanujan.
