= Star Vintage Gold Cup =

Annual Star-class sailing regatta for vintage Star boats

- First held: 2017
- Organizer: Gull Lake Star Fleet
- Type: Sailing
- Classes: Vintage Star
- Yachts used: Vintage Star-class yachts
- Venue: Gull Lake, Richland, Michigan
- Champions: (United States) Luke Lawrence (India) Mohammed Asif
- Most titles: (United States) Paul Cayard (3x)
- Website: www.vintagegoldcup.com

Notes
- Sanctioned as a Special Event by the International Star Class Yacht Racing Association (ISCYRA).

The Star Vintage Gold Cup is an annual regatta for vintage Star-class yachts, administered as a sanctioned Special Event by the International Star Class Yacht Racing Association (ISCYRA). Established in 2017, the event is hosted by the Gull Lake Star Fleet and is sailed on Gull Lake in Richland, Michigan, in vintage Star boats, including restored wooden hulls.

The winners are awarded the Vintage Gold Cup perpetual trophy and the gold laurel wreath honor for winning the championship, in accordance with Star Class tradition.

== History ==
The Star Vintage Gold Cup was first sailed in 2017 as a regatta focused on vintage Star-class yachts, with the stated theme “Honoring the Past – Leading the Future.” Coverage of the inaugural edition described the event as drawing a broad cross-section of Star sailors competing in restored wooden Star boats.

Subsequent editions of the regatta have continued to emphasize the restoration and active racing of vintage Star boats. Reporting from later editions noted fleet participation consisting of wooden Star hulls built prior to the widespread adoption of fiberglass construction in the class.

== Boats and format ==
The Star Vintage Gold Cup is sailed in vintage Star boats that meet the event's eligibility requirements, emphasizing traditional wooden construction and historically representative designs restored to racing condition. Racing is conducted under the Racing Rules of Sailing and Star Class rules, with the organizing authority listed as the Gull Lake Star Fleet in conjunction with ISCYRA.

== Gold laurel wreath honors ==
According to Star Class materials, the Star Vintage Gold Cup is a sanctioned Special Event for which honors are presented to the winners in the form of a gold laurel wreath. The Star Class refers to this recognition as the Gold Wreath Honor Award, associated with winning the Vintage Gold Cup and eligible for display on the sail by the recipient.

== Winners ==
| Edition | Skipper | Crew | Ref |
|---|---|---|---|
| 2017 | (United States) Paul Cayard | (United States) Brian Fatih | |
| 2018 | (United States) Paul Cayard | (United States) Daniel Cayard | |
| 2019 | (Norway) Eivind Melleby | (United States) Joshua Revkin | |
| 2020 | Event not sailed due to COVID | | |
| 2021 | (United States) Paul Cayard | (United States) Daniel Cayard | |
| 2022 | (Brazil) Lars Grael | (Japan) Isao Toyama | |
| 2023 | (Brazil) Lars Grael | (Brazil) Mauricio Bueno | |
| 2024 | (Norway) Eivind Melleby | (United States) Joshua Revkin | |
| 2025 | (United States) Luke Lawrence | (India) Mohamed Asif | |

== See also ==
- Star (keelboat)
- International Star Class Yacht Racing Association
