= Luke Lawrence (sailor) =

American sailor

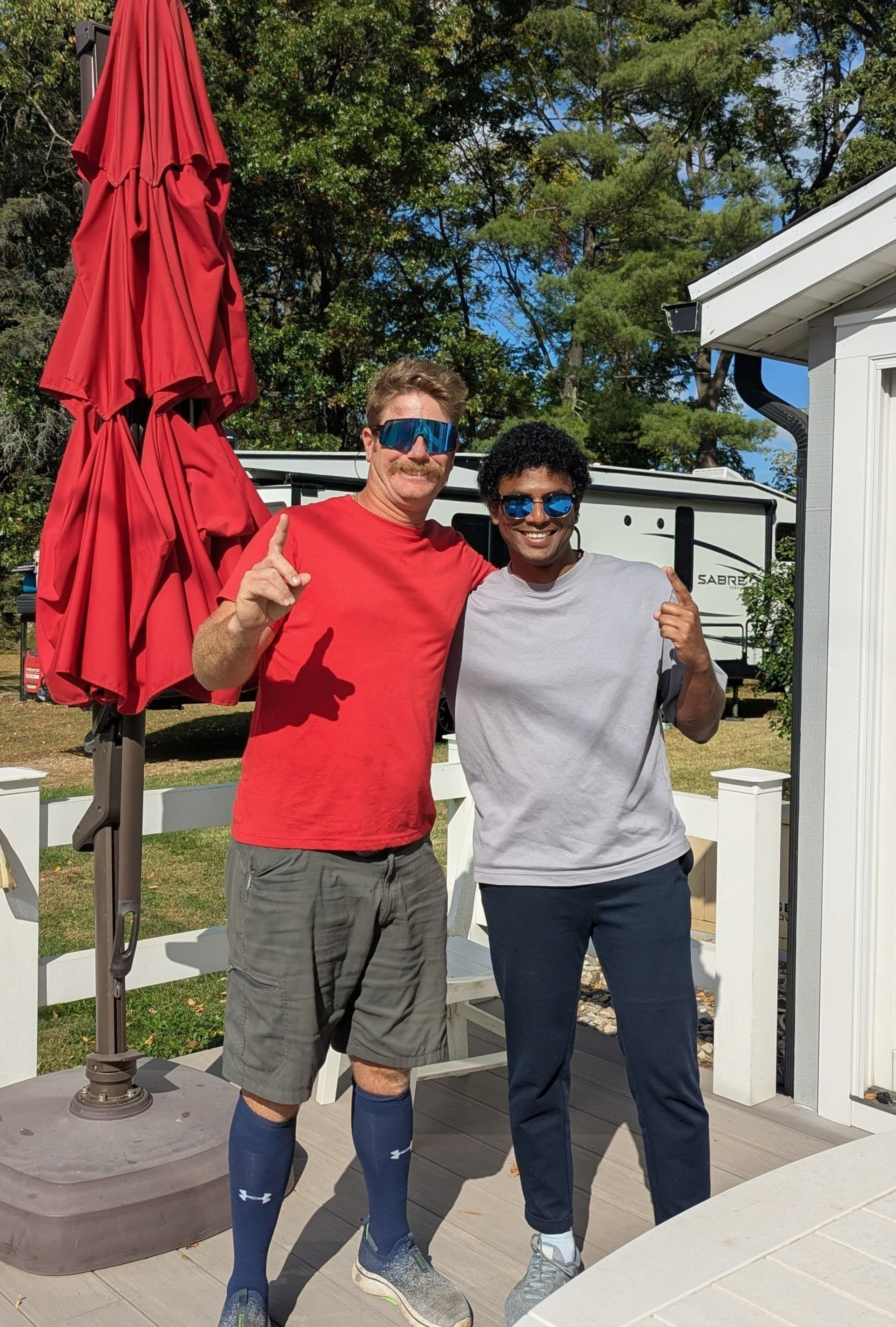
- Lawrence (left) and Asif after their VGC 2025 victory.

Personal information
- Full name: Luke Lawrence
- Nationality: United States
- Born: 24 August 1990 (age 36)

Sailing career
- Sport: Sailing
- Classes: Star, Finn, J/24, J/22, Etchells
Medal record
World Championships
Gold medal – first place	2019 Biscayne Bay, USA	Star (U30)
Gold medal – first place	2016 Kingston, Canada	J/22
Silver medal – second place	2015 Hong Kong	Etchells
Gold medal – first place	2014 Newport, USA	J/24
Gold medal – first place	2010 San Francisco, USA	Finn (Youth)
Silver medal – second place	2008 Århus, Denmark	Laser (Youth)
Star Vintage Gold Cup
Gold medal – first place	2025 Michigan, USA	Star (Vintage)
Silver medal – second place	2023 Michigan, USA	Star (Vintage)

Luke Lawrence (born 24 August 1990) is an American yachtsman and professional sailor who has competed internationally across dinghy and keelboat sailing championships. He has won world championship titles in the Finn, J/24, J/22, and Star classes, and is a medalist at the Youth Sailing World Championships and a winner of the Star Vintage Gold Cup.

== Career ==
Lawrence gained early international recognition at the 2008 Volvo Youth Sailing ISAF World Championship in Århus, Denmark, where he won the silver medal in the Boys' One Person Dinghy (Laser), finishing second to Pavlos Kontides.

In 2010, he won the Finn Silver Cup, the junior world championship for the Finn class, held in San Francisco.

He later achieved success in keelboat sailing, winning the J/24 World Championship in 2014 as part of the winning crew aboard Cougar, skippered by Will Welles. In 2016, Lawrence won the J/22 World Championship, earning a second keelboat world title.

In the Star class, Lawrence won the inaugural Star Junior World Championship (Under 30) in 2019, sailing with Alexey Selivanov.

In Etchells class competition, Lawrence was part of the team that finished second overall at the 2015 Etchells World Championship in Hong Kong.

He has also recorded podium finishes at continental and regional championships in the Star and Etchells classes, including a silver medal at the Star North American Championship sailing with Ian Coleman and a victory at the Star Western Hemisphere Championship sailing with Paul Cayard.

He is a recipient of the Star Class Gold Laurel Wreath, an honor awarded to the winners of the Star Vintage Gold Cup, which he won in 2025 sailing with Mohammed Asif at Gull Lake, Michigan.

In 2026, Lawrence won the Van Nostrand Cup ice yacht race sailing aboard the Arial with Max Lopez, representing the Hudson River Ice Yacht Club. He is a fourth-generation member of the club; his grandfather, Bob Lawrence, was a boat builder and competitive sailor.

=== World Championships ===
Year	Event	Venue	Result	Partner	Class	Ref
2026	Etchells World Championship	San Diego, United States	19th	(United States) Andrew Macrae (United States) Brad Boston	Etchells	
2022	Star World Championship	Marblehead, Massachusetts, United States	14th	(United States) Andrew Macrae	Star	
2019	Star Junior World Championship	Biscayne Bay, United States	1st	(Russia) Alexey Selivanov	Star	
2016	J/22 World Championship	Kingston, Canada	1st	(United States) Michael Marshall (United States) Todd Hiller	J/22	
2015	Etchells World Championship	Hong Kong	2nd	(United States) Steve Benjamin (United States) Georg Peet (Hong Kong) Meihan Cheung	Etchells	
2014	J/24 World Championship	Newport, United States	1st	(United States) Will Welles	J/24	
2012	505 World Championship	Hamilton Island, Australia	20th	(United States) Augie Diaz	505	
2010	505 World Championship	Aarhus, Denmark	23rd	(United States) Augie Diaz	505	
2010	Finn Youth World Championship	San Francisco, United States	1st	—	Finn	
2008	Volvo Youth Sailing ISAF World Championship	Aarhus, Denmark	2nd	—	Laser	
2007	Volvo Youth Sailing ISAF World Championship	Kingston, Canada	11th	—	Laser	

=== Star Vintage Gold Cup ===
Year	Event	Venue	Result	Partner	Class	Ref
2025	Star Vintage Gold Cup	Gull Lake, Michigan, United States	1st	(India) Mohammed Asif	Star	
2024	Star Vintage Gold Cup	Gull Lake, Michigan, United States	5th	(United States) Mark Pincus	Star	
2023	Star Vintage Gold Cup	Gull Lake, Michigan, United States	2nd	(United States) Joshua Powell	Star	
2019	Star Vintage Gold Cup	Gull Lake, Michigan, United States	8th	(Canada) Bryan Milne	Star	

=== Continental Championships ===
Year	Event	Venue	Result	Partner	Class	Ref
2015	Etchells North American Championship	United States	1st	—	Etchells	
2017	Star North American Championship	Marblehead, United States	2nd	(United States) Ian Coleman	Star	
2021	Star Western Hemisphere Championship	Miami, United States	1st	(United States) Paul Cayard	Star	
2025	Etchells North American Championship	San Diego, United States	1st	—	Etchells	
2025	Star North American Championship	United States	2nd	(United States) Paul Cayard	Star	
