= Brian Fatih =

American sailor (born 1972)

Personal information
- Nationality: United States
- Born: October 18, 1972 (age 53) Atlanta, Georgia, United States

Sport

Sailing career
- Class: Star

Brian Fatih (born October 18, 1972, in Atlanta, Georgia) is an American Olympic sailor in the Star class. He competed in the 2012 Summer Olympics together with Mark Mendelblatt, where they finished 7th.

At the 2011 Star World Championship held in Perth, Australia, skipper Mark Mendelblatt and crew Brian Fatih won the bronze medal.

Brian Fatih, sailing with skipper Paul Cayard, won the inaugural Star Vintage Gold Cup in 2017. He was awarded the gold laurel wreath honor for this victory.
