= Pascal Rambeau =

French sailor

Medal record

Sailing

Representing France

Olympic Games
Bronze medal – third place	2004 Athens	Star

Pascal Rambeau (born 14 April 1972) is a French sailor. He won a bronze medal in the Star class with Xavier Rohart at the 2004 Summer Olympics.
