= Star South American Championship =

Star South American Championship are annual South American Championship sailing regattas in the Star class organised by the International Star Class Yacht Racing Association.

== Editions ==
Year	City	Country	Dates	Athletes	Nations	Note
1990						
1991						
1992	Buenos Aires	Argentina	20–30 January			
1993						
1994	Buenos Aires	Argentina	26 February – 5 March			
1995	Rio de Janeiro	Brazil	28 January – 4 February			
1996	Búzios	Brazil	3–6 January			
1997						
1998	Búzios	Brazil	2–7 January			
1999						
2000	Rio de Janeiro	Brazil	16–21 January			
2001	Buenos Aires	Argentina	16–21 January			
2002	Rio de Janeiro	Brazil	2–6 January			
2003	Olivos	Argentina	14–19 January			
2004	Rio de Janeiro	Brazil	22–25 February			
2005	Buenos Aires	Argentina	5–9 January			
2006	Rio de Janeiro	Brazil	17–23 February			
2007	Mar del Plata	Argentina	19–25 March			
2008	Rio de Janeiro	Brazil	3–8 January			
2009	Valparaíso	Chile	10–14 January			
2010	Rio de Janeiro	Brazil	24–29 November 2009			
2011	Buenos Aires	Argentina	30 March – 3 April			
2012	Rio de Janeiro	Brazil	22–25 March			
2013	San Isidro	Argentina	21–25 November			
2014	Ilhabela	Brazil	22–26 July			
2015	Buenos Aires	Argentina	28–31 October			
2016	Paranoá	Brazil	27–31 July			
2017	Olivos	Argentina	23–27 November			

== Medalists ==
Year	Gold	Silver	Bronze
2017 Olivos	Brazil; M. Bellotti; M. Bueno	Argentina; H. Longarela; H. Longarela	Argentina; F. MacGowan; A. Simonet
