= Joshua Revkin =

American sailor

Personal information
- Full name: Joshua Revkin
- Nationality: United States
- Born: 25 July 1990 (age 35) Connecticut, United States

Sailing career
- Sport: Sailing
- Class(es): Star, Finn
Medal record
World Championships
| Bronze medal – third place | 2016 Miami, United States | Star |
| Gold medal – first place | 2017 Troense, Denmark | Star |
| Silver medal – second place | 2018 Oxford, United States | Star |
| Bronze medal – third place | 2019 Porto Cervo, Italy | Star |
Star Vintage Gold Cup
| Gold medal – first place | 2019 Vintage Gold Cup | Star |
| Gold medal – first place | 2024 Vintage Gold Cup | Star |

Joshua Revkin (born 25 July 1990) is an American sailor and a world champion in the Star class.

== Career ==
He won the Star World Championship in 2017 in Troense, Denmark, sailing with Eivind Melleby. He is a recipient of the Star Class Gold Laurel Wreath, an honor awarded to the winners of the Star Vintage Gold Cup.

=== World Championships ===
| Year | Event | Venue | Result | Partner | Class | Ref |
|---|---|---|---|---|---|---|
| 2019 | Star World Championship | Porto Cervo, Italy | 3rd | (Norway) Eivind Melleby | Star | |
| 2018 | Star World Championship | Oxford, United States | 2nd | (Norway) Eivind Melleby | Star | |
| 2017 | Star World Championship | Troense, Denmark | 1st | (Norway) Eivind Melleby | Star | |
| 2016 | Star World Championship | Miami, United States | 3rd | (United States) Brian Ledbetter | Star | |

=== Star Vintage Gold Cup ===
| Year | Event | Venue | Result | Partner | Class | Ref |
|---|---|---|---|---|---|---|
| 2019 | Star Vintage Gold Cup | Gull Lake, United States | 1st | (United States) Eivind Melleby | Star | |
| 2024 | Star Vintage Gold Cup | Gull Lake, United States | 1st | (United States) Eivind Melleby | Star | |
