= Lars Grael =

Brazilian sailor

Lars Grael OMM
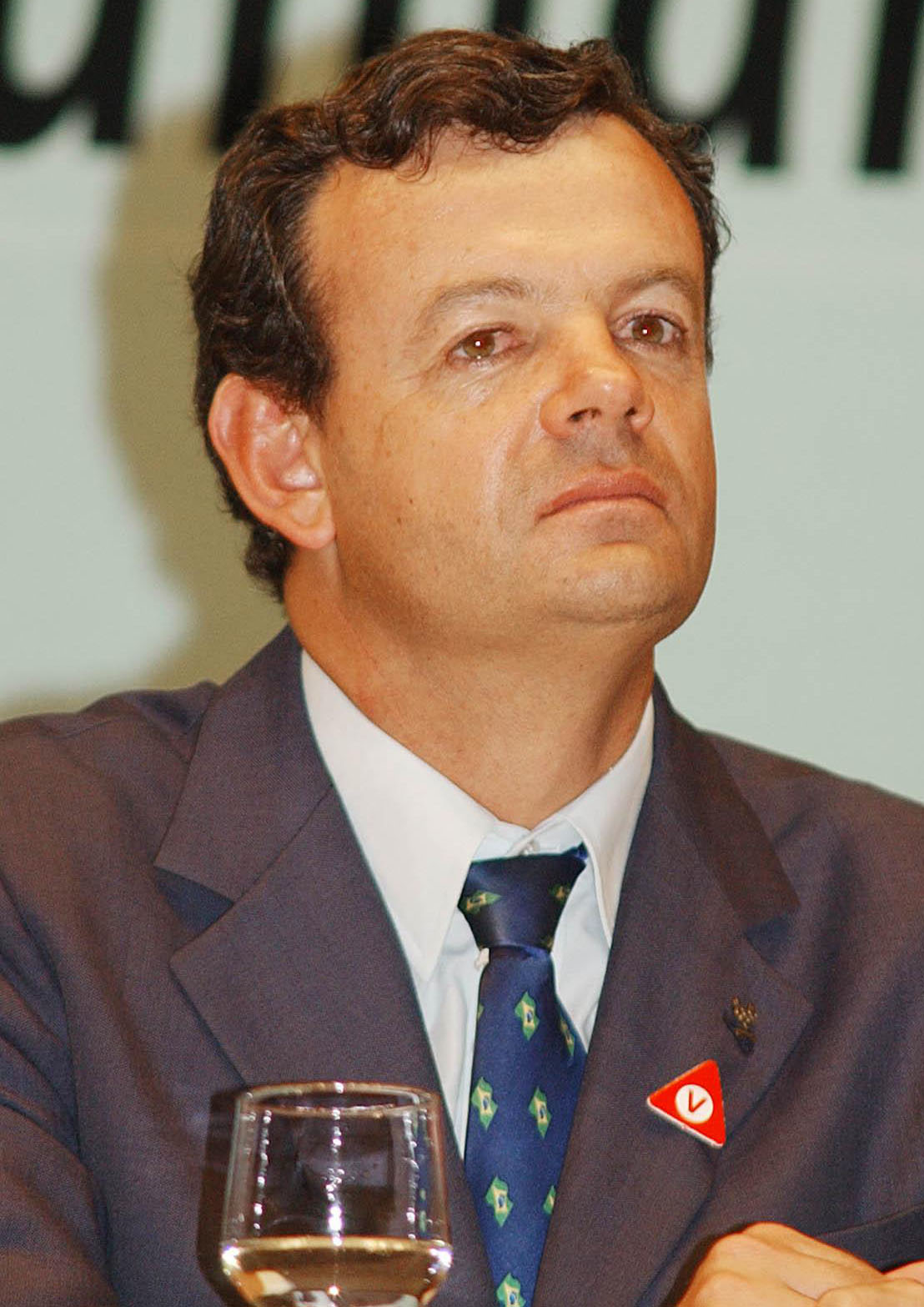

Personal information
- Full name: Lars Schmidt Grael
- Nationality: Brazil
- Born: February 9, 1964 (age 62) São Paulo, Brazil

Sailing career
- Sport: Sailing
- Club: Rio Yacht Club
- Class(es): Tornado, Star, Snipe
Medal record
Olympic Games
| Bronze medal – third place | 1988 Seoul | Tornado |
| Bronze medal – third place | 1996 Atlanta | Tornado |
World Championships
| Bronze medal – third place | 1981 Long Beach, USA | Snipe |
| Gold medal – first place | 1983 Porto, Portugal | Snipe |
| Bronze medal – third place | 2009 Varberg, Sweden | Star |
| Gold medal – first place | 2015 Buenos Aires, Argentina | Star |
| Silver medal – second place | 2017 Troense, Denmark | Star |
Star Vintage Gold Cup
| Silver medal – second place | 2019 Vintage Gold Cup | Star |
| Gold medal – first place | 2022 Vintage Gold Cup | Star |
| Gold medal – first place | 2023 Vintage Gold Cup | Star |
| Silver medal – second place | 2025 Vintage Gold Cup | Star |

Lars Schmidt Grael OMM (born 9 February 1964, in São Paulo) is a Brazilian sailor and public official. He is a two-time Olympic bronze medalist in the Tornado class, having won medals at the 1988 Summer Olympics in Seoul and the 1996 Summer Olympics in Atlanta. He is also a world champion in the Snipe and Star classes, winning the Snipe World Championship in 1983 and the Star World Championship in 2015.

Grael competed in four Olympic Games and achieved multiple national and international titles across several sailing classes, including Tornado, Star, and Snipe. Over the course of his career, he earned podium finishes at world, continental, and regional championships, establishing himself as one of Brazil’s most successful competitive sailors across multiple decades.

In September 1998, Grael was involved in a serious motorboat accident during a sailing competition in Vitória, Espírito Santo, which resulted in the amputation of one of his legs. He later returned to competitive sailing and continued to compete at the highest international level following his recovery.

Beyond competition, Grael has been active in public service and social initiatives related to sport. He served in appointed roles in Brazilian public administration focused on sports policy at both the federal and state levels. He is also a co-founder of Projeto Grael, a Brazilian non-profit organization that promotes social inclusion through sailing and nautical education.

== Accident ==
In September 1998, Grael was involved in a serious motorboat accident during a sailing competition in Vitória, Espírito Santo. A motorboat entered the race area and collided with his boat, resulting in the amputation of one of his legs. He later returned to competitive sailing following his recovery.

== Philanthropy and social initiatives ==
Lars Grael is a co-founder of Projeto Grael, a Brazilian non-profit organization established in 1998 in Niterói, Rio de Janeiro, together with his brother Torben Grael and sailor Marcelo Ferreira. The organization focuses on social inclusion through sailing and nautical activities, offering free sports, educational, and vocational programs to children and young people from economically vulnerable communities.

Projeto Grael operates primarily from Charitas Beach and provides instruction in sailing, swimming, and canoeing, as well as workshops related to boat maintenance and environmental education. Grael has also participated in events organized in partnership with international institutions, including a United Nations Office on Drugs and Crime seminar on sport and social inclusion in Brazil.

== Public service and administration ==
Lars Grael has served in appointed public administration roles related to sports policy in Brazil. He served as "National Secretary of Sports" at the federal level from 2001 to 2002.

He later served as "Secretary of Youth, Sports and Leisure" for the State of São Paulo from 2003 to 2006, where his responsibilities included oversight of state-level sports and youth programs.

In 1999, Grael was awarded the Order of Military Merit by the Brazilian government, as published in the "Diário Oficial da União". He has also received the Medal of Military Sports Merit, a distinct decoration awarded by Brazil’s Ministry of Defence in recognition of contributions to military sport.

== Achievements ==
As of December 2025

Across his competitive sailing career, Grael competed in four Olympic Games, reaching the medal race in each appearance and earning two bronze medals in the Tornado class. At the world championship level, he achieved multiple podium finishes across several classes, including a world title in the Star class and a world title in the Snipe class, along with additional medals in Star, Ocean, 12 Metre, and 6 Metre competition. Beyond world and Olympic events, Grael recorded extensive success at the continental level, winning multiple South American championships in both the Star and Tornado classes, as well as podium finishes at European, North American, Western Hemisphere, and Southern Hemisphere championships.

=== Olympic Games ===
Grael represented Brazil in four editions of the Olympic Games between 1984 and 1996, competing exclusively in the Tornado class. Across these appearances, he reached the medal race in each Olympic campaign and earned two bronze medals, first at the 1988 Summer Olympics in Seoul and again at the 1996 Summer Olympics in Atlanta. His Olympic career spanned more than a decade and included partnerships with multiple crew members.

| Result | Event | Crew | Venue | Class |
|---|---|---|---|---|
| 7th | 1984 Summer Olympics | (Brazil) Clinio Freitas | Los Angeles, United States | Tornado |
| 3rd | 1988 Summer Olympics | (Brazil) Clinio Freitas | Seoul, South Korea | Tornado |
| 8th | 1992 Summer Olympics | (Brazil) Clinio Freitas | Barcelona, Spain | Tornado |
| 3rd | 1996 Summer Olympics | (Brazil) Henrique Pellicano | Atlanta, United States | Tornado |

=== World Championships ===
At the world championship level, Grael achieved podium finishes across multiple sailing classes over several decades. He won world titles in both the Snipe and Star classes, claiming the Snipe World Championship in 1983 and the Star World Championship in 2015. In addition to his world titles, he recorded several podium finishes in the Star class and earned medals in Ocean, 12 Metre, and 6 Metre competition, reflecting sustained competitiveness across different boat types and eras.

| Year | Event | Venue | Result | Crew / Boat | Class | Ref |
|---|---|---|---|---|---|---|
| 1981 | Snipe World Championship | Long Beach, United States | 3rd | (Brazil) Torben Grael | Snipe | |
| 1983 | Snipe World Championship | Porto, Portugal | 1st | (Brazil) Torben Grael | Snipe | |
| 1999 | Ocean World Championship | Salvador, Brazil | 3rd | Magia 4 Telemar (Nelson / Marek 31) | Ocean | |
| 2005 | 12 Metre World Championship | Newport, United States | 2nd | KZ3 - Wright on White | 12 Metre | |
| 2009 | Star World Championship | Varberg, Sweden | 3rd | (Brazil) Ronald Seifert | Star | |
| 2010 | Star World Championship | Rio de Janeiro, Brazil | 4th | (Brazil) Ronald Seifert | Star | |
| 2015 | Star World Championship | Buenos Aires, Argentina | 1st | (Brazil) Samuel Gonçalves | Star | |
| 2016 | Star World Championship | Miami, United States | 4th | (Brazil) Samuel Gonçalves | Star | |
| 2017 | Star World Championship | Troense, Denmark | 2nd | (Brazil) Samuel Gonçalves | Star | |
| 2017 | 6 Metre World Championship | Vancouver, Canada | 3rd | KC19 - SASKIA | 6 Metre | |
| 2019 | Star Vintage Gold Cup | Gull Lake, United States | 2nd | (United States) Arnis Baltins | Star | |
| 2022 | Star Vintage Gold Cup | Gull Lake, United States | 1st | (Japan) Isao Toyama | Star | |
| 2023 | Star Vintage Gold Cup | Gull Lake, United States | 1st | (Brazil) Mauricio Bueno | Star | |
| 2025 | Star Vintage Gold Cup | Gull Lake, United States | 2nd | (Brazil) Marco Lagoa | Star | |

=== Continental Championships ===
Beyond world and Olympic competition, Grael recorded extensive success at the continental level. He won multiple South American championships, particularly in the Star and Tornado classes, and achieved podium finishes at European, North American, Western Hemisphere, and Southern Hemisphere championships. These results extended his international competitive career well beyond his Olympic years and across multiple regions.

==== European Championships ====
| Year | Event | Venue | Result | Crew | Class | Ref |
|---|---|---|---|---|---|---|
| 2018 | European Championship | Flensburg, Germany | 2nd | Samuel Gonçalves | Star | |
| 2017 | European Championship | Sanremo, Italy | 4th | | Star | |
| 2016 | European Championship | Gaeta, Italy | 4th | | Star | |
| 2008 | European Championship | Balaton, Hungary | 4th | | Star | |
| 1996 | European Championship | Attersee, Austria | 4th | | Tornado | |

==== North American Championships ====
| Year | Event | Venue | Result | Crew | Class | Ref |
|---|---|---|---|---|---|---|
| 2011 | North American Championship | Lido, United States | 2nd | | Star | |
| 2006 | North American Championship | Newport, United States | 2nd | | 12 Metre | |
| 2010 | North American Championship | Los Angeles, United States | 5th | | Star | |
| 2007 | North American Championship | Vancouver, Canada | 7th | | Star | |

==== South American Championships ====
| Year | Event | Venue | Result | Crew | Class | Ref |
|---|---|---|---|---|---|---|
| 2023 | South American Championship | Rio de Janeiro, Brazil | 1st | (Brazil) Mauricio Bueno | Star | |
| 2016 | South American Championship | Brasília, Brazil | 1st | (Brazil) Samuel Gonçalves | Star | |
| 2014 | South American Championship | Ilhabela, Brazil | 1st | (Brazil) Samuel Gonçalves | Star | |
| 2011 | South American Championship | Mar del Plata, Argentina | 1st | (Brazil) Ronald Seifert | Star | |
| 2008 | South American Championship | Angra dos Reis, Brazil | 1st | (Brazil) Marcelo Jordan | Star | |
| 2005 | South American Championship | Buenos Aires, Argentina | 1st | (Brazil) Marco Lagoa | Star | |
| 1998 | South American Championship | Búzios, Brazil | 1st | | Tornado | |
| 1995 | South American Championship | Búzios, Brazil | 1st | | Tornado | |
| 1991 | South American Championship | Araruama, Brazil | 1st | | Tornado | |
| 1989 | South American Championship | Niterói, Brazil | 1st | | Tornado | |
| 2018 | South American Championship | Rio de Janeiro, Brazil | 2nd | (Brazil) Samuel Gonçalves | Star | |
| 2012 | South American Championship | Angra dos Reis, Brazil | 2nd | (Brazil) Samuel Gonçalves | Star | |
| 1995 | South American Championship | Rapel, Chile | 2nd | | J/24 | |
| 1994 | South American Championship | Rio de Janeiro, Brazil | 2nd | | Soling | |
| 1985 | South American Championship | Florianópolis, Brazil | 2nd | | Ocean | |
| 1985 | South American Championship | Búzios, Brazil | 2nd | | Tornado | |
| 2015 | South American Championship | Buenos Aires, Argentina | 3rd | (Brazil) Samuel Gonçalves | Star | |
| 1999 | South American Championship | Salvador, Brazil | 3rd | | Ocean | |

==== Western Hemisphere Championships ====
| Year | Event | Venue | Result | Crew | Class | Ref |
|---|---|---|---|---|---|---|
| 2018 | Western Hemisphere Championship | Miami, United States | 1st | | Star | |
| 2014 | Western Hemisphere Championship | Sunapee, United States | 1st | | Star | |
| 2015 | Western Hemisphere Championship | Miami, United States | 2nd | | Star | |

==== Southern Hemisphere Championships ====
| Year | Event | Venue | Result | Crew | Class | Ref |
|---|---|---|---|---|---|---|
| 2011 | Southern Hemisphere Championship | Rio de Janeiro, Brazil | 2nd | | Star | |
