= Eivind Melleby =

Norwegian sailor

Eivind Melleby OLY
Personal information
- Full name: Eivind Melleby
- Nationality: Norway
- Born: 19 April 1972 (age 54) Oslo, Norway

Sailing career
- Sport: Sailing
- Club: Royal Norwegian Yacht Club
- Class(es): Star, Laser, Melges 24, J/70, Volvo 70
Medal record
World Championships
Gold medal – first place	2017 Troense, Denmark	Star
Silver medal – second place	2018 Oxford, United States	Star
Bronze medal – third place	2019 Porto Cervo, Italy	Star
Bronze medal – third place	2014 Malcesine, Italy	Star
Bronze medal – third place	2009 Porto Cervo, Italy	Melges 24
Bronze medal – third place	1995 Tenerife, Spain	Laser
Star Vintage Gold Cup
Gold medal – first place	2019 Vintage Gold Cup	Star
Gold medal – first place	2024 Vintage Gold Cup	Star

Eivind Melleby OLY (born 19 April 1972) is a Norwegian sailor. He represented Norway at the 2012 Summer Olympics in the Star class and won the Star World Championship in 2017.

He has also achieved podium finishes at world championship level in multiple classes and is a recipient of the Star Class Gold Laurel Wreath, an honor awarded to the winners of the Star Vintage Gold Cup.

== Career ==
Eivind Melleby has competed internationally in Olympic sailing, one-design keelboat racing, and professional offshore competition. His career includes participation at world championship level across several classes, with podium finishes in the Star, Melges 24, and ILCA 7 (Laser) classes.

=== Olympic sailing ===
Melleby represented Norway at the 2012 Summer Olympics in London, competing in the Star class.

Year	Event	Venue	Result	Crew	Class	Ref
2012	Summer Olympics	London, United Kingdom	4th	Petter Morland Pedersen	Star	

=== World Championships ===
Melleby has competed at the World Sailing-recognized world championship level in multiple sailing classes. His results include a world title in the Star class, additional podium finishes in the Star class, and medals at the Melges 24 and ILCA 7 World Championships.

Year	Event	Venue	Result	Crew	Class	Ref
2019	Star World Championship	Porto Cervo, Italy	3rd	(United States) Joshua Revkin	Star	
2018	Star World Championship	Oxford, United States	2nd	(United States) Joshua Revkin	Star	
2017	Star World Championship	Troense, Denmark	1st	(United States) Joshua Revkin	Star	
2014	Star World Championship	Malcesine, Italy	3rd	(Brazil) Bruno Prada	Star	
2012	Star World Championship	Hyères, France	17th	(Norway) Petter Morland Pedersen	Star	
2010	Star World Championship	Rio de Janeiro, Brazil	8th	(Norway) Petter Morland Pedersen	Star	
2008	Star World Championship	Miami, United States	40th	(Norway) Petter Morland Pedersen	Star	
2009	Melges 24 World Championship	Porto Cervo, Italy	3rd	(Norway) Espen Stokkeland (Norway) Petrus Eidi (Norway) Lars Horn Johannessen	Melges 24	
1995	Laser World Championship	Tenerife, Spain	3rd	—	Laser	

=== Star Vintage Gold Cup ===
Melleby is a recipient of the Star Class Gold Laurel Wreath, an honor awarded to the winners of the Star Vintage Gold Cup. He has won the event twice, in 2019 and 2024.

Year	Event	Venue	Result	Crew	Class	Ref
2019	Star Vintage Gold Cup	Gull Lake, United States	1st	(United States) Joshua Revkin	Star	
2024	Star Vintage Gold Cup	Gull Lake, United States	1st	(United States) Joshua Revkin	Star	
