= Ian Ainslie =

South African olympic sailor (born 1967)

Personal information
- Born: 27 July 1967 (age 58)

Sailing career
- Sport: Sailing
- Class(es): Dinghy & Keelboats

Ian Richard Ainslie (born 27 July 1967) is a South African Olympic sailor, who specialized in the Finn class boats. Ainslie took part in three Olympic Games – Barcelona (1992), Atlanta (1996) and Sydney (2000). He won the 2001 J/22 World Championship.

He sailed for Team Shosholoza in the 2007 Louis Vuitton Cup. He won 1997 and 2001 J/22 World Championship as helmed.
