= Gull Lake (Michigan) =

Lake in the state of Michigan, United States

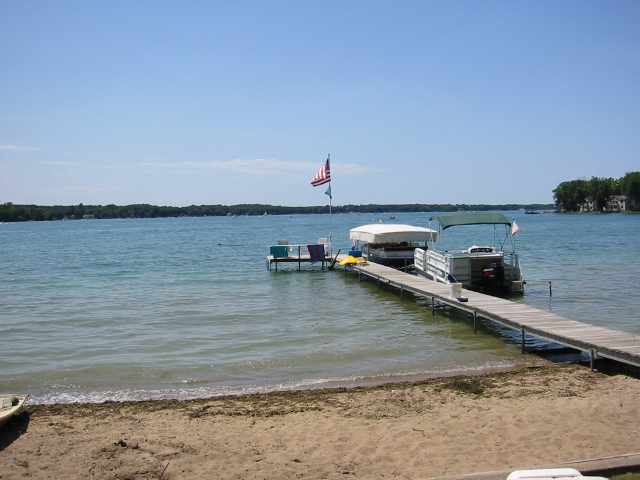

- Location within Michigan
- Location: Kalamazoo / Barry counties, Michigan, United States
- Coordinates: 42°23′59″N 85°24′41″W
- Type: Lake
- Primary outflows: Gull Creek
- Basin countries: United States
- Surface area: 2,030 acres (8 km^{2})
- Max. depth: 110 ft (34 m)
- Surface elevation: 879 feet (268 m)
- Islands: 3
- Settlements: Gull Lake

Gull Lake is a lake in the U.S. state of Michigan, located mostly in Kalamazoo County with the northern tip extending into Barry County. The nearest major cities are Kalamazoo, 11 miles (18 km) to the southwest, and Battle Creek, 13 miles (21 km) to the southeast. The name was probably derived from the seagulls which at times come inland from Lake Michigan in large numbers. The total surface area of this lake is 2,030 acres (8 km^{2}), with maximum depths of 110 feet (34 m). This deep, clear lake has numerous holes in excess of 75 ft (23 m), and has one large island in the south end. The shoreline of the lake is fully developed, and is ringed with homes and cottages. A notable sport fishery exists in the lake for Rainbow trout, Lake trout, Land-locked salmon, Smelt, Smallmouth bass, and Yellow perch. Many other species of fish such as bluegill, Largemouth bass, Smallmouth bass, and Northern Pike are home to this lake. Given the proximity of this lake to large centers of population, coupled with the extensive number of riparian property owners, with one public access, the lake is extensively used by boaters during the warm summer months, and can become quite congested with water traffic.

== History ==
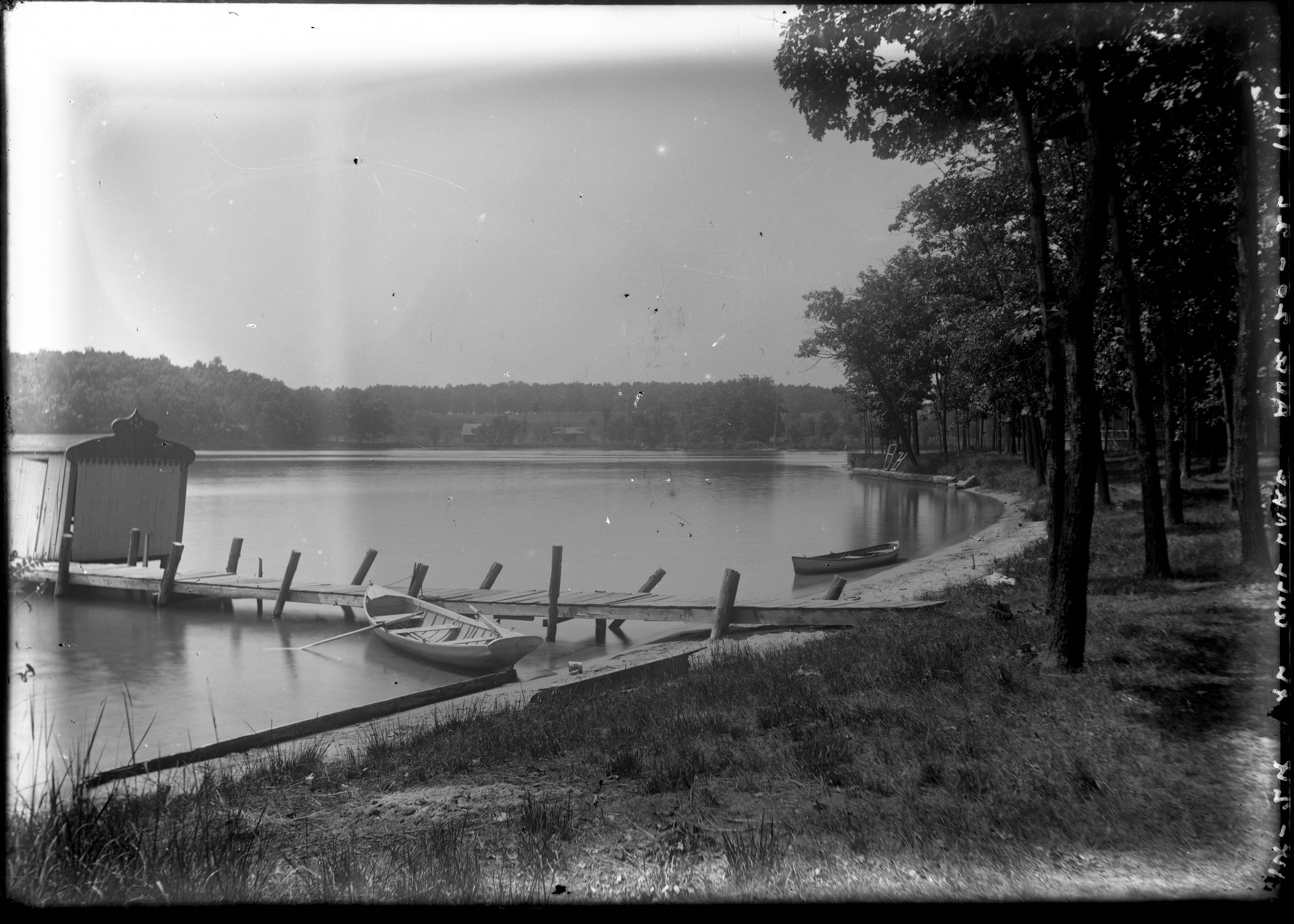
Gull Lake photographed in August 1916

The area around Gull Lake was settled in the 1830s, especially the fertile Gull Prairie. The native Potawatomi people were moved west after the 1821 Treaty of Chicago, though some remained into the 1830s. The primary settlement on Gull Lake was Yorkville, located on the lake's outlet. At one time, several small manufacturing enterprises existed here, including a celery-flavored breakfast cereal maker.

An interurban rail line once connected Gull Lake to nearby Battle Creek and Kalamazoo. The lake became a popular summer getaway for wealthy families, such as the Upjohns (pharmaceuticals), the Shakespeares (fishing tackle) from Kalamazoo and the Kelloggs (breakfast cereal) from Battle Creek. As the years wore on, many people set up year-round residences on the lake—replacing the smaller seasonal cottages. This led to water quality problems, but these improved after an extensive sewer system was installed in the early 1980s. Infestations of the non-native zebra mussel also helped clear the water, as these are filter-feeders.

== Description ==
Its clear waters have made Gull Lake a local scuba diving hot spot. Many artifacts have been placed in the lake for divers to swim through and look at. A list of these include a phone booth, motorcycle, car, ice shanty, swing set, railroad tracks, and two boats. The lake is accessible to divers year round; many even go diving here in the winter once the water has frozen over.

The lake is sufficiently large to support a yacht club, with sailboat racing on weekends. Even keel boats such as Starboat and small cruising sailboats can be raced safely.

== See also ==
- List of lakes in Michigan
