= Scow (disambiguation) =

Scow can refer to:

== Boats ==
- Scow, a type of boat including the following versions:
  - Garbage scow, for hauling refuse
  - A-Scow, 38 feet long
  - E-Scow, 28 feet long
  - C-Scow, 20 feet long
  - I-20 (sailing scow) 20 feet long
  - MC Scow, 16 feet long
  - M Scow, 16 feet long

=== Wrecks ===
- Niagara Scow, near Niagara Falls
- Success (shipwreck), a wreck in Lake Michigan near Wisconsin

== People ==
- Alfred Scow (1927-2013), Aboriginal-Canadian lawyer and judge
- Kate Scow, US professor of soil science and microbial ecology

== See also ==
- Scowl (disambiguation)
- Scour (disambiguation)
