= Morgan Reeser =

American sailor

Personal information
- Full name: Morgan Irwin Reeser
- Born: November 14, 1962 (age 63) Fort Lauderdale, Florida, U.S.
- Height: 198 cm (6 ft 6 in)
- Weight: 80 kg (176 lb)

Sailing career
- Sport: Sailing
- College team: United States Merchant Marine Academy
- Club: Key Biscayne Yacht Club
- Class(es): 470, Melges 32, J/70, Melges 20, Melges 24
Medal record
Men's sailing
Representing the United States
Olympic Games
Silver medal – second place	1992 Barcelona	470 class

Morgan Irwin Reeser (born November 14, 1962) is a sailor from the United States, who competed in two Summer Olympics: 1992 and 1996. He won the silver medal in 1992 with Kevin Burnham in the Men's 470 class and lost out on a second medal after being scored OCS during the final race of the 1996 Olympic Games.

He won the ICSA Coed Dinghy National Championship and was named College Sailor of the Year twice, in 1983 and 1984.

Reeser coached Sofia Bekatorou and Emilia Tsoulfa of Greece to an Olympic gold medal in the women's 470 class in 1992. He also coached Luke Patience and Stuart Bithell of Great Britain to an Olympic silver medal in men's 470 class in 2012. He has won 23 world championships in classes such as the Melges 20, Melges 32, Etchells, and J70.

He was born in Fort Lauderdale, Florida and is married to Irish Olympian Louise Cole-Reeser.
