= Lake Geneva station =

Former rail station in Zenda, Wisconsin, US

Lake Geneva
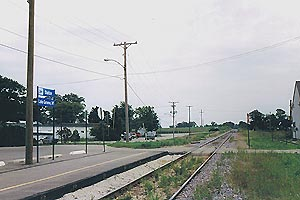
- Lake Geneva station at Zenda in August 2001

General information
- Location: 3771 Forrest Glenn Street; Zenda, Wisconsin, US
- Coordinates: 42.510754°N 88.484472°W
- Line: Wisconsin and Southern Railroad Fox Lake Subdivision
- Platforms: 1 side platform
- Tracks: 1

Construction
- Accessible: Yes

Other information
- Station code: LKG

History
- Opened: 1901 (Milwaukee Road), June 15, 2000 (Amtrak)
- Closed: 1982 (Milwaukee Road), September 23, 2001 (Amtrak)

Former services
Preceding station	Amtrak	Following station
Janesville Terminus	Lake Country Limited	Glenview toward Chicago
Preceding station	Milwaukee Road	Following station
Walworth toward Madison	Madison – Rondout	Solon Mills toward Rondout
Walworth Terminus	Suburban Service North Line	Solon Mills toward Chicago
Location

Lake Geneva station was an Amtrak intercity rail station in Zenda, Wisconsin, United States. Commuter service to Zenda was operated by the Milwaukee Road from 1901 to 1982. Lake Geneva station was added as an infill station on the Lake Country Limited on June 15, 2000, to serve the Lake Geneva resort area. The Lake Country Limited was never successful, and service ended on September 23, 2001. Commuter service with a stop near Zenda was studied in 2001, but found to only be marginally feasible.

== History ==
=== Milwaukee Road ===
The Milwaukee Road opened its line from Fox Lake to Janesville, Wisconsin, on June 3, 1901, with Zenda soon among the intermediate stops on Walworth–Chicago commuter service. Service to Zenda was always limited; by 1939, it was served only by a single daily Walworth–Chicago round trip. Intercity service on the line, including the Sioux and Varsity, did not stop between Fox Lake and Walworth. Amtrak took over intercity service on May 1, 1971. Intercity service on the Chicago–Janesville–Madison corridor was dropped at that time, leaving only the single commuter round trip. Weekend service ended on October 6, 1973. Service to Solon Mills, Spring Grove, Walworth and Zenda ended on October 1, 1982, as Metra took over commuter rail in the Chicago region. At that time, only 18 daily commuters used the four stops northwest of Fox Lake.

=== Amtrak ===
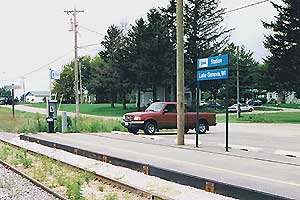
The station platform and parking area

Amtrak began operating the Janesville–Chicago Lake Country Limited on April 15, 2000, as part of the Network Growth Strategy, which called for trains to carry mail and express cargo to subsidize passenger service. Glenview was initially the only intermediate stop on the route. An additional stop was desired to serve the Lake Geneva resort area. Amtrak initially planned to use the former Milwaukee Road station in Walsworth, and it was listed as a future stop in a May timetable, though the township of Linn was interested in a stop at Zenda. Service directly to Lake Geneva was not feasible, as the former Chicago and North Western Railroad branch line that served the town was abandoned north of Ringwood in 1982.

On May 13, 2000, Wisconsin governor Tommy Thompson announced plans for an infill station at Zenda. The station, called Lake Geneva by Amtrak, opened on June 15. Its addition briefly doubled ridership on the Lake Country Limited – from 5-6 daily to 11 – but it returned to the former level by fall. The train was never successful; it was canceled between December 27, 2000, and February 2, 2001, due to equipment shortages, and had the worst operating ratio of any Amtrak route. It became a Saturday-only train on March 24, 2001, deadheading back from Janesville to Chicago on Saturday evening. At times, there were no passengers for Janesville, and the train returned directly from Lake Geneva. Lake Country Limited service ended on September 23, 2001.

=== Proposed commuter service ===
A 2001 study by the Southeastern Wisconsin Regional Planning Commission evaluated a possible re-extension of Metra Milwaukee District North Line commuter service from Fox Lake to Walworth over the Wisconsin and Southern Railroad Fox Lake Subdivision. A station at Wisconsin Highway 120, about 1.2 miles (1.9 km) east of Zenda, was proposed to better serve Lake Geneva than the Zenda location. The stop was expected to have about 120 daily boardings, which was lower than most Metra stations. The study found that extension of service to Walsworth was only marginally feasible, and did not recommend further consideration until Metra should plan the Illinois portion of the extension.
