= Melges 15 =

Sailboat class

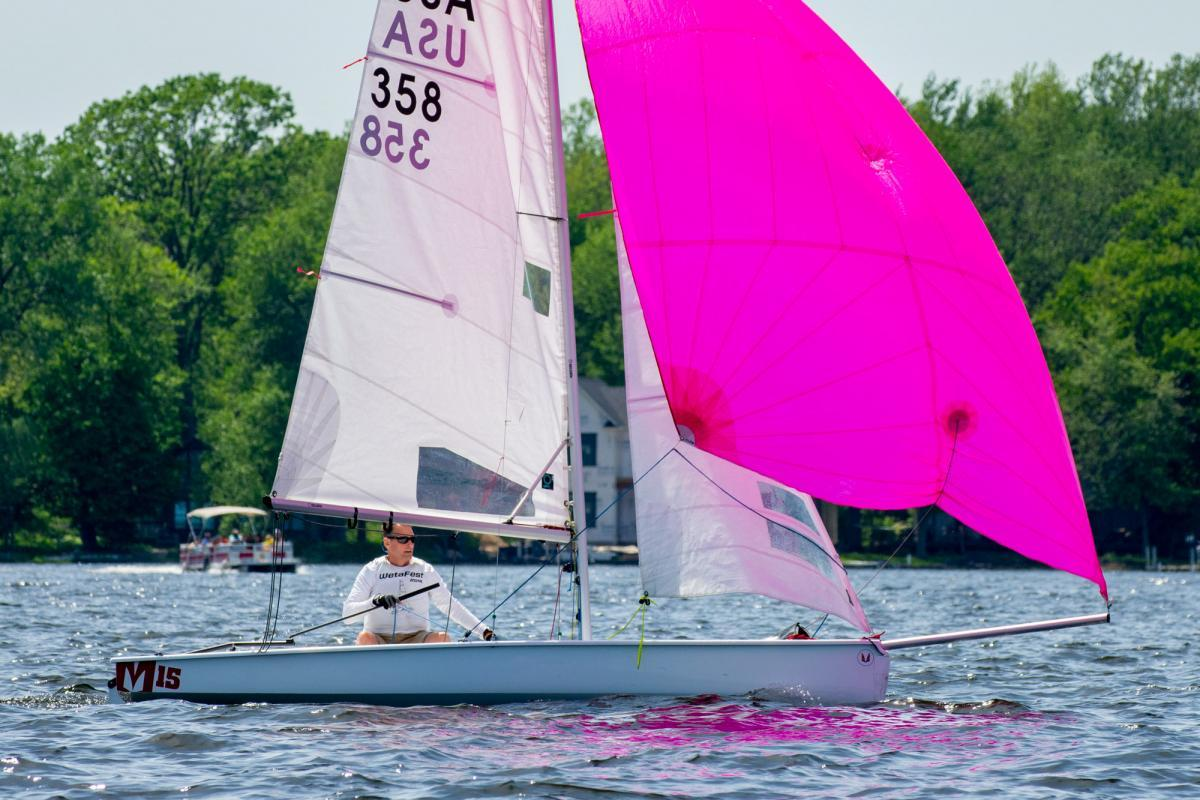

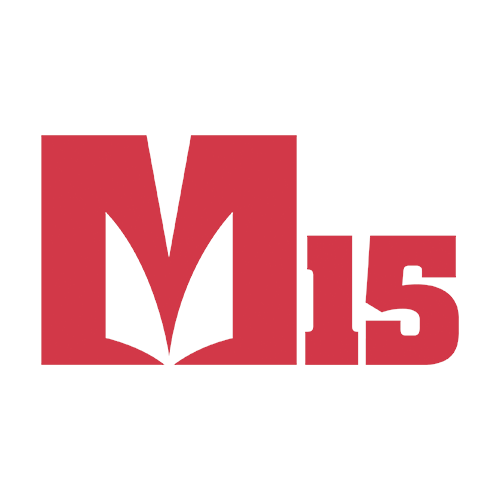

Development
- Designer: Reichel/Pugh
- Location: United States
- Year: 2020
- No. built: 1000+ (July 2025)
- Builders: Melges Performance Sailboats; Nelo
- Name: Melges 15

Boat
- Crew: Two
- Displacement: 230 lb (104 kg)
- Draft: 2.58 ft (0.79 m) with daggerboard down

Hull
- Type: monohull
- Construction: fiberglass
- LOA: 15.00 ft (4.57 m)
- Beam: 5.50 ft (1.68 m)

Hull appendages
- Keel: daggerboard
- Rudder: transom-mounted rudder

Rig
- Rig type: Bermuda rig

Sails
- Sailplan: fractional rigged sloop masthead sloop
- Mainsail area: 93.6 sq ft (8.70 m^{2})
- Jib/genoa area: 39.8 sq ft (3.70 m^{2})
- Spinnaker area: 156 sq ft (14.5 m^{2})
- Upwind sail area: 133.4 sq ft (12.39 m^{2})
- Downwind sail area: 289.4 sq ft (26.89 m^{2})

The Melges 15 is an American sailboat that was designed by Reichel/Pugh as a two-crew, one-design racer and sail trainer. First built in 2020, it is Reichel/Pugh's design #289.

In December 2021 the design was named Sailing World magazine's 2022 Boat of the Year.

== Production ==
The design has been built by Melges Performance Sailboats in the United States since 2020 and remains in production. Beginning in March 2022, the boat is also being built for the European market by Nelo in Vila do Conde, Portugal.

A total of 150 boats had been delivered by October 2021, 600 by January 2023 and over 1000 by July 2025. Following the fast growth of the class in the United States, sustained expansion in the European market is expected, with distribution and class events in several European countries, including Ireland, Portugal, Switzerland and the United Kingdom.

The inaugural European Championship for the Melges 15 class was hosted in July 2025 as part of the Volvo Dun Laoghaire Regatta in Dublin Bay, Ireland.

== Design ==
The boat's main design goals were stability and performance over a variety of conditions. The hull design employs a narrow beam and a flat cross-section shape to provide stability and improve righting moment, while making it easy to plane. It also has fore-aft hull rocker built in to allow sailing in larger waves. The design incorporates a deep cockpit, high boom and other measures to improve crew ergonomics.

The Melges 15 is a racing sailing dinghy, with the hull built predominantly of polyester fiberglass. It has a fractional sloop rig with a retractable bowsprit and a Gnav boom vang system. The spars are aluminum. The hull has a plumb stem; a vertical transom; a transom-hung, kick-up aluminum rudder controlled by a tiller with an extension and a retractable, aluminum daggerboard. It displaces 230 lb (104 kg).

The boat has a draft of 2.58 ft (0.79 m) with the daggerboard extended. Removing the daggerboard allows operation in shallow water, beaching or ground transportation on a trailer.

For sailing downwind the design may be equipped with an asymmetrical spinnaker of 156 sq ft (14.5 m^{2}), with a single line launch and retrieval system.

The Melges 15 has a provisional DP-N of 86.

== Operational history ==
Sailing World magazine's 2022 Boat of the Year judges noted, "'of all the boats we sailed, it was the one I really didn't want to get off of,' Stewart says. 'For me, selecting it as our Boat of the Year comes down to execution of the build and its performance. It's exceptional in all ways. Everything is so well-integrated and clean. It starts with a good designer, and then it's good product development and craftsmanship—there's nothing on this boat that you don't need.' Powlison seconds Stewart's praise for the boat, especially the part about how it serves such a wide variety of crew combinations. 'It's not just a race boat, but a boat to go sail and have fun with anyone, anytime.'"

Other prior overall winners of the award include the 29er, Melges 24, Farr 40, Esse 850 and J/70.

== See also ==
- List of sailing boat types
