= US Sailing Championship of Champions =

The US Sailing Championship of Champions is a sailing competition organized by US Sailing annually since 1976. The winner takes the Jack Brown Trophy.

== Champions ==
Year	Winner	Boats raced
1976 spring	Clark Thompson, Jr., Doug Johnston, Lawrence Daniel	Pearson Ensign
1976 fall	Tom Ehman, Major Hall	Flying Scot
1977	Tom Linskey, Jeff Linehart	Buccaneer
1978	Tom Linskey, Neal Fowler	Coronado 15
1979	Hobie Alter, Jr., Christian Banks	Prindle 16
1980	Dave Ullman, Jim Linskey	470
1981	John Kolius, Chuck Wilk, Mark Foster	J/24
1982	John Kostecki	Sunfish
1983	Hobie Alter, Jr., Scott Ward	Hobie 18
1984	Riaz Latifullah, Barney Harris, Jud Smith	Albacore
1985	Steve Rosenberg, Brodie Cobb, Jim Brady	Snipe
1986	Ed Adams, Meredith Adams, Geoff Moore	Snipe
1987	Paul Foerster, Andrew Goldman, Bill Draheim	Flying Dutchman
1988	Ed Adams, Meredith Adams	1986 Champions
1989	Bart Hackworth, Will Baylis	Santana 20
1990	Craig Leweck, Matt Reynolds	Lido 14
1991	Jamie McCreary	International One Design
1992	Paul Foerster	MC Scow
1993	Russell Robinson, Mike Considine	110
1994	Russell Robinson, Allan Robinson	110
1995	Brian Taboada, Larry Colantuano	Ideal 18
1996	George Szabo, Stacey Dumain	Lido 14
1997	George Szabo, Stacey Dumain	Lido 14
1998	Kelly Gough, Heide Gough, Natalie Mauney	Flying Scot
1999	John Mollicone, Danny Rabin	JY15
2000	Paul Foerster, Carrie Foerster	JY15
2001	George Szabo, Brian Janney	Star
2002	Bill Draheim, Natalie Mauney, Scott Mauney	Flying Scot
2003	Allen Terhune	MC Scow
2004	Michael Funsch, Jay Lurie	JY15
2005	Michael Ingham, E. Baker, Delia Ingham	Flying Scot
2006	Alan Field, Steve Hunt	Y flyer
2007	Ernesto Rodriguez, Megan Place	Snipe
2008	Doug Kaukeinen	Sunfish
2009	Skip Dieball	Lightning
2010	Chris Raab, Robert Kinney	Ideal 18
2011	Andrew Eagan, Marcus Eagan	Flying Scot
2012	Ed Eckert, Matthew Schmidt	C-Scow
2013	Brian Keane, Steve Hunt, Victor Diaz De Leon	Lightning
2014	Mike Ingham, Delia Ingham, Dan Fien	Thistle
2015	Brad Funk, Trevor Burd	VX:One
2016	Paul Jon Patin	Sunfish
2017	Steve Benjamin	Sonar
2018	Bill Draheim, Rod Favela	Y Flyer
2019	Dalton Bergan, Benjamin Glass	Ideal 18's
