= Glenview station =

Railroad station in Glenview, Illinois

Glenview, IL
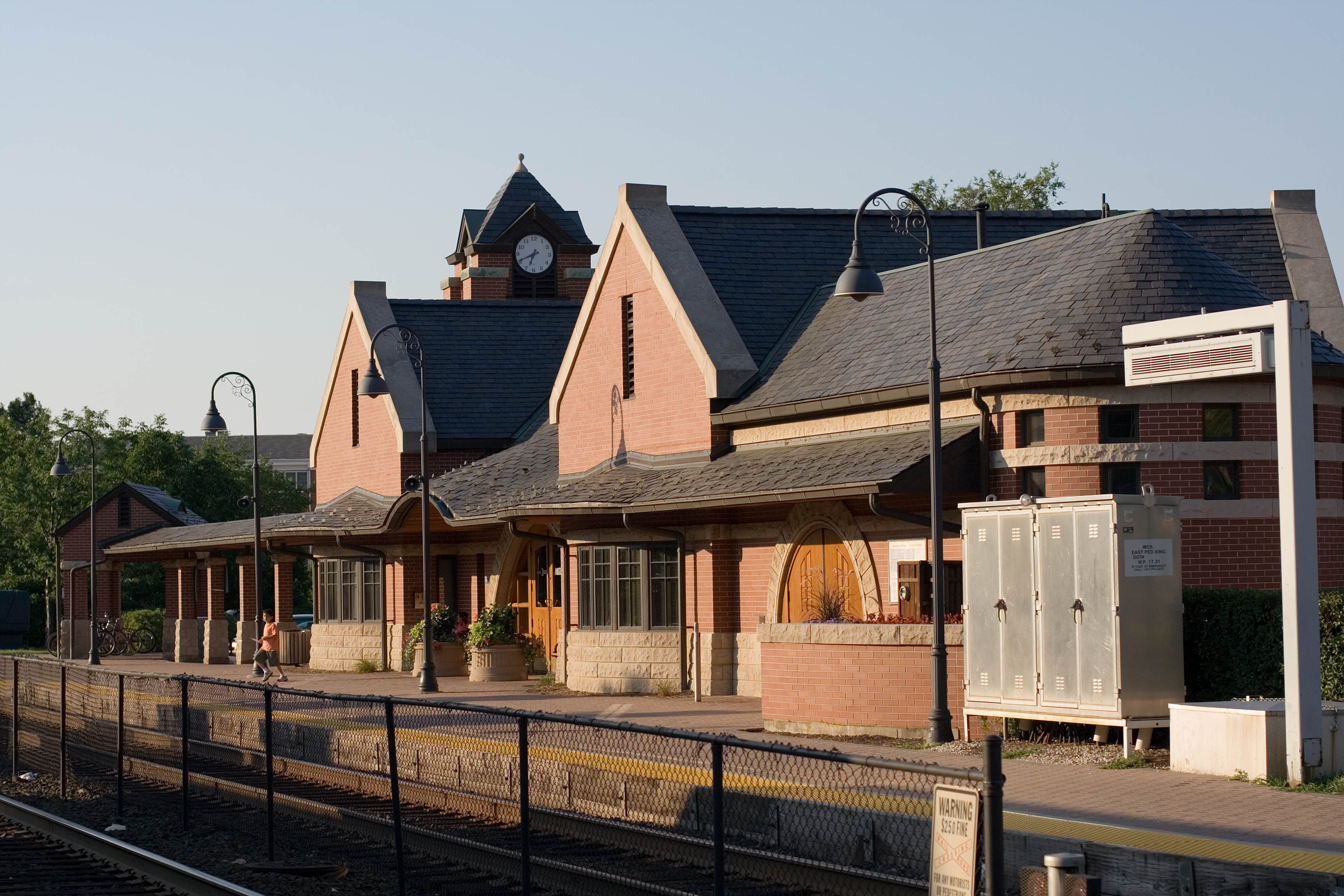

General information
- Location: 1116 Depot Street; Glenview, Illinois; United States
- Coordinates: 42.0751°N 87.8057°W
- Owner: Metra
- Line: CPKC C&M Subdivision
- Platforms: 2 side platforms
- Tracks: 2
- Connections: Pace

Construction
- Parking: Yes
- Accessible: Yes

Other information
- Station code: Amtrak: GLN
- Fare zone: 3 (Metra)

History
- Opened: March 1995

Passengers
- FY 2025: 57,752 annually (Amtrak)
- 2018: 1,462 (avg. weekday) ▲1.6% (Metra)
- Rank: 22 out of 236 (Metra)

Services
Preceding station	Amtrak	Following station
Sturtevant toward St. Paul	Borealis	Chicago Terminus
Milwaukee toward Seattle or Portland	Empire Builder	Chicago Terminus
Sturtevant toward Milwaukee	Hiawatha	Chicago Terminus
Preceding station	Metra	Following station
The Glen/North Glenview toward Fox Lake	Milwaukee District North	Golf toward Union Station
Former services
Preceding station	Amtrak	Following station
Lake Geneva toward Janesville	Lake Country Limited	Chicago Terminus
Preceding station	Milwaukee Road	Following station
Techny toward Milwaukee	Chicago – Milwaukee	Golf toward Chicago
Techny toward Walworth	Suburban Service North Line	Golf toward Chicago
Track layout
Location

Glenview station is a Metra commuter rail and Amtrak intercity rail station in Glenview, Illinois, United States, north of Chicago. The station is located at 1116 Depot Street, 17.5 miles (28.2 km) from Chicago Union Station, the southern terminus of the lines. The facility opened in March 1995 as a replacement for a since-demolished 1950s era station. The new station, designed by Legat Architects of Waukegan, cost approximately $3 million and was funded from a number of sources, including Metra, the Illinois Department of Transportation, Amtrak and the village of Glenview.

On Metra, the station is located on the Milwaukee District North Line that runs between Chicago Union Station and Fox Lake, Illinois. On Amtrak, the station is located on three lines, the Hiawatha between Chicago and Milwaukee, Wisconsin, the Borealis between Chicago and St. Paul, Minnesota, and the Empire Builder between Chicago, Seattle, Washington, and Portland, Oregon. It also served the short-lived Lake Country Limited which ran between Chicago and Janesville, Wisconsin between April 15, 2000, and September 23, 2001. Frequent, daily service is provided on both the Milwaukee District North Line and the Hiawatha, while the Empire Builder and Borealis provide once-a-day service. Normally, passengers traveling between Glenview and Chicago or Glenview and Milwaukee are not permitted to board or disembark on the Empire Builder at Glenview, due to the availability of the more frequent Metra and Hiawatha trains. However, for much of the spring of 2020, the Empire Builder allowed local travel between Glenview and Milwaukee when the Hiawatha was suspended due to the COVID-19 pandemic.

It is proposed that the Amtrak service would shift one stop north to The Glen/North Glenview station. This move would eliminate lengthy stops which block traffic on Glenview Road. This move would involve reconstruction of the North Glenview station to handle the additional traffic, and depends on commitments from Glenview, the Illinois General Assembly and Metra.

As of 2018, Glenview is the 22nd busiest of Metra's 236 non-downtown stations, with an average of 1,462 weekday boardings.

As of July 15, 2024, all Metra trains on the Milwaukee District North Line make a scheduled stop in Glenview, with a total of 54 trains (27 in each direction) on weekdays, 20 trains (10 in each direction) on Saturdays, and 18 trains (nine in each direction) on Sundays and holidays. Amtrak service to Glenview consists of six Hiawatha trains heading south from Milwaukee with five being daily service and one being Monday through Saturday, and seven heading north to Milwaukee with six being daily service, one being Monday through Friday and one on Friday night, in addition to a single daily service each by the Borealis and the Empire Builder.

== Bus connections ==
Pace

- 210 Lincoln Avenue (weekdays only)
- 422 Linden CTA/Glenview/Northbrook Court (weekdays only)
- 423 Linden CTA/The Glen/Harlem CTA (weekdays only)
