= M Scow =

Sailboat class

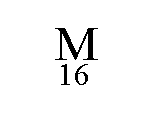
- Class symbol

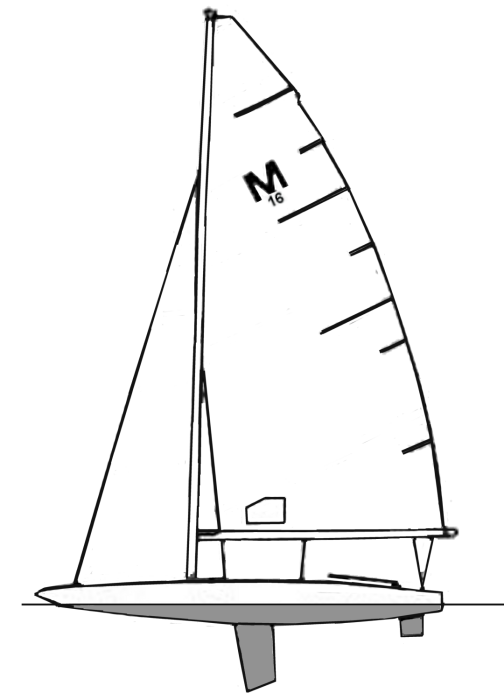

Development
- Designer: Johnson/Melges Boat Works
- Location: United States
- Year: 1950
- Builders: Tanzer Industries; Melges Performance Sailboats; Windward Boatworks
- Role: One-design racer
- Name: M Scow

Boat
- Displacement: 440 lb (200 kg)
- Draft: 2.67 ft (0.81 m), with a bilgeboard down

Hull
- Type: Monohull
- Construction: Fiberglass
- LOA: 16.00 ft (4.88 m)
- Beam: 5.80 ft (1.77 m)

Hull appendages
- Keel: twin bilgeboards
- Rudder: dual internally-mounted rudders

Rig
- Rig type: Bermuda rig

Sails
- Sailplan: Fractional rigged sloop
- Mainsail area: 108.00 sq ft (10.034 m^{2})
- Jib/genoa area: 39.00 sq ft (3.623 m^{2})
- Total sail area: 147.00 sq ft (13.657 m^{2})

Racing
- D-PN: 89.3

The M Scow, also called the M-Scow and the M-16 Scow, is a Canadian/American sailing dinghy that was designed by Johnson Boat Works and Melges Boat Works as a one-design racer and first built in 1950.

== Production ==
The design was built by Tanzer Industries in Dorion, Quebec, Canada as well as by Windward Boatworks in Middleton, Wisconsin United States and Melges Performance Sailboats in Zenda, Wisconsin, also in the United States, but it is now out of production.

== Design ==
The M Scow is a recreational sailboat, built predominantly of fiberglass, with wood trim. It has a fractional sloop rig with tapered or untapered aluminum or wooden spars. The hull is a reverse sheer scow design, with dual internally-mounted rudders controlled by a tiller and a dual retractable bilgeboards. It displaces 440 lb (200 kg).

The boat has a draft of 2.67 ft (0.81 m) with a bilgeboard extended. It can be transported on a trailer.

For sailing the design was originally equipped with end-boom sheeting to a mainsheet traveler, mainsail and jib windows for improved visibility. It also has a boom vang and Cunningham, barber haulers, and a jib traveler.

The dual rudders, rotating mast and the mainsheet traveler were done away with in a 1999 redesign. The hull and rigging were also changed to the MC Scow hull and rigging designs. In the 2020 the MC Scow remained in production, while the M Scow was no longer offered for sale.

The design has a Portsmouth Yardstick racing average handicap of 89.3 and is normally raced with a crew of two sailors.

== Operational history ==
In a 1994 review Richard Sherwood wrote, "the M-16 scow is raced on the East Coast, in the Southeast, and in the Southwest, but most boats are found in the Midwest ... limiting specifications are issued by the Inland Lake Yachting Association, which holds a championship regatta with 60 to 90 competitors."

== See also ==
- List of sailing boat types

Similar boats

- Melges 17
