= 2021 Melges 20 World Championship =

2021 World Championships
- Venue: Coconut Grove Sailing Club
- Location: (United States) Miami
- Dates: 8–12 December 2021
- Competitors: 18 boats

The 2021 Melges 20 World Championships were held from 8 to 12 December 2021 in Miami, United States.

== Results ==
Pos.	Name	Role	Name	ID	Tot	Net	R1	R2	R3	R4	R5	R6	R7	R8	R9	R10
1	USA 7676; Kuai	Helm	Daniel Thielman (USA)	USADT49	45	26	3	5	1	4	1	1	2	7	2	(DNS)19
1	USA 7676; Kuai	Spinnaker trimmer	Alec Anderson (IVB)	IVBAA1	45	26	3	5	1	4	1	1	2	7	2	(DNS)19
1	USA 7676; Kuai	Crew	Lucas Calabrese (ARG)	ARGLC1	45	26	3	5	1	4	1	1	2	7	2	(DNS)19
1	USA 7676; Kuai	Bow	Rayleen Thielman (USA)	USART55	45	26	3	5	1	4	1	1	2	7	2	(DNS)19
2	RUS 898; RUSSIAN BOGATYRS	Helm	Igor Rytov (RUS)	RUSIR3	50	39	4	10	2	3	5	6	1	-11	6	2
2	RUS 898; RUSSIAN BOGATYRS	Crew	Michele Ivaldi (ITA)	ITAMI4	50	39	4	10	2	3	5	6	1	-11	6	2
2	RUS 898; RUSSIAN BOGATYRS	Crew	Anton Sergeev (RUS)	RUSAS27	50	39	4	10	2	3	5	6	1	-11	6	2
3	USA 217; Honeybadger	Helm	Harry Roepers (USA)		68	49	10	6	9	1	(RET)19	7	9	2	4	1
3	USA 217; Honeybadger	Crew	Ian Liberty (USA)	USAIL7	68	49	10	6	9	1	(RET)19	7	9	2	4	1
3	USA 217; Honeybadger	Crew	Michael Menninger (USA)	USAMM101	68	49	10	6	9	1	(RET)19	7	9	2	4	1
3	USA 217; Honeybadger	Crew	Katy Nastro (USA)	USAKN26	68	49	10	6	9	1	(RET)19	7	9	2	4	1
4	CAN 214; Grinning Streak	Helm	Rhonda Joyce (CAN)	CANRJ4	66	49	11	1	3	8	3	4	7	3	9	-17
4	CAN 214; Grinning Streak	Headsail Trimmer	John Bowden (USA)	USAJB68	66	49	11	1	3	8	3	4	7	3	9	-17
4	CAN 214; Grinning Streak	Tactician	Mike Buckley (USA)	USAMB20	66	49	11	1	3	8	3	4	7	3	9	-17
5	USA 305; Midnight Sun	Helm	Alexis Michas (USA)	USAAM101	70	59	6	2	6	5	6	10	8	6	10	-11
5	USA 305; Midnight Sun	Tactician	Cameron Appleton (NZL)	NZLCA1	70	59	6	2	6	5	6	10	8	6	10	-11
5	USA 305; Midnight Sun	Spinnaker trimmer	Brian Porter (USA)	USABP67	70	59	6	2	6	5	6	10	8	6	10	-11
6	USA 290; Pineapple Express	Helm	John Sommi (USA)	USAJS365	73	60	2	3	8	2	10	-13	12	5	8	10
6	USA 290; Pineapple Express	Bow	Cole Brauer (USA)	USACB253	73	60	2	3	8	2	10	-13	12	5	8	10
6	USA 290; Pineapple Express	Tactician	Victor Diaz De Leon (VEN)	VENVD3	73	60	2	3	8	2	10	-13	12	5	8	10
6	USA 290; Pineapple Express	Headsail Trimmer	Charlie Smythe (USA)	USACS60	73	60	2	3	8	2	10	-13	12	5	8	10
7	RUS 309; NIKA	Helm	Vladimir Prosikhin (RUS)	RUSVP7	85	68	1	11	-17	13	8	2	6	10	13	4
7	RUS 309; NIKA	Tactician	Carlos Robles Lorente (BRA)	BRACL15	85	68	1	11	-17	13	8	2	6	10	13	4
7	RUS 309; NIKA	Bow	Federica Salvà (ITA)	ITAFS14	85	68	1	11	-17	13	8	2	6	10	13	4
7	RUS 309; NIKA		Giorgio Tortarolo (ITA)	ITAGT2	85	68	1	11	-17	13	8	2	6	10	13	4
8	USA 228; Midnight Blue	Helm	Jason Michas (USA)	USAJM295	88	73	12	4	10	-15	4	5	3	15	11	9
8	USA 228; Midnight Blue	Crew	Keiran Searle (AUS)	AUSKS6	88	73	12	4	10	-15	4	5	3	15	11	9
8	USA 228; Midnight Blue	Crew	Elliot Willis (GBR)	GBREW9	88	73	12	4	10	-15	4	5	3	15	11	9
8	USA 228; Midnight Blue	Bow	Chandler Self (USA)	USACS331	88	73	12	4	10	-15	4	5	3	15	11	9
9	USA 14; Red Sky Sailing Team	Helm	Paul Reilly (USA)	USAPR49	100	82	9	7	7	16	2	-18	18	1	15	7
9	USA 14; Red Sky Sailing Team	Crew	Andy Burdick (USA)	USAAB59	100	82	9	7	7	16	2	-18	18	1	15	7
9	USA 14; Red Sky Sailing Team	Mast	Matt Woodworth (USA)	USAMW39	100	82	9	7	7	16	2	-18	18	1	15	7
10	USA 226; Gamecock	Helm	Peter Mcclennen (USA)	USAPM172	100	82	7	9	15	-18	14	8	4	12	7	6
10	USA 226; Gamecock	Crew	(USA)		100	82	7	9	15	-18	14	8	4	12	7	6
10	USA 226; Gamecock	Crew	(USA)		100	82	7	9	15	-18	14	8	4	12	7	6
11	ITA 229; Mela	Helm	Andrea Rossi (ITA)	ITAAR11	101	84	5	-17	5	12	12	11	13	13	5	8
11	ITA 229; Mela	Main Trimmer	Giulio Desiderato (ITA)	ITAGD41	101	84	5	-17	5	12	12	11	13	13	5	8
11	ITA 229; Mela	Headsail Trimmer	Stefano Orlandi (ITA)	ITASO3	101	84	5	-17	5	12	12	11	13	13	5	8
11	ITA 229; Mela	Tactician	Enrico Zennaro (ITA)	ITAEZ1	101	84	5	-17	5	12	12	11	13	13	5	8
12	GBR 250; Boo-Fu	Helm	Sam Barron-Fox (GBR)	GBRSB146	102	86	8	12	-16	14	7	3	11	14	3	14
12	GBR 250; Boo-Fu	Tactician	Stu Bithell (GBR)	GBRSB31	102	86	8	12	-16	14	7	3	11	14	3	14
12	GBR 250; Boo-Fu	Headsail Trimmer	Mal Parker (AUS)	AUSMP17	102	86	8	12	-16	14	7	3	11	14	3	14
13	ITA 267; TEAMBIANCA	Helm	Davide Castelli (ITA)	ITADC67	104	87	14	7	4	6	13	9	15	4	-17	15
13	ITA 267; TEAMBIANCA	Spinnaker trimmer	Stefano Ciampalini (ITA)	ITASC20	104	87	14	7	4	6	13	9	15	4	-17	15
13	ITA 267; TEAMBIANCA	Tactician	Matteo Ivaldi (ITA)	ITAMI12	104	87	14	7	4	6	13	9	15	4	-17	15
13	ITA 267; TEAMBIANCA		Livia Tarabella (ITA)	ITALT36	104	87	14	7	4	6	13	9	15	4	-17	15
14	USA 8 Ghostrider	Helm	Jennifer Canestra (USA)	USAJC256	119	102	17	16	12	-17	15	12	5	8	1	16
14	USA 8 Ghostrider	Tactician	Evan Aras (USA)	USAEA28	119	102	17	16	12	-17	15	12	5	8	1	16
14	USA 8 Ghostrider	Bow	Madeline Gill (USA)	USAMG108	119	102	17	16	12	-17	15	12	5	8	1	16
14	USA 8 Ghostrider	In the way	David Hughes (USA)	USADH5	119	102	17	16	12	-17	15	12	5	8	1	16
15	USA 186; Shaka	Helm	Kelly Shannon (USA)	USAKS1	125	108	16	14	13	7	11	14	14	-17	14	5
15	USA 186; Shaka	Spinnaker trimmer	Ben Lynch (IRL)	IRLBL4	125	108	16	14	13	7	11	14	14	-17	14	5
15	USA 186; Shaka	Tactician	Harry Melges IV (USA)	USAHM42	125	108	16	14	13	7	11	14	14	-17	14	5
15	USA 186; Shaka	Bow	Elisabeth Whitener (USA)	USAEW85	125	108	16	14	13	7	11	14	14	-17	14	5
16	USA 212; TRUE	Helm	Mark Bremer (USA)	USAMB167	134	116	15	15	11	11	17	15	17	-18	12	3
16	USA 212; TRUE	Nav/Tac	Philip Barnard (VIN)	VINPB1	134	116	15	15	11	11	17	15	17	-18	12	3
16	USA 212; TRUE	In the way	Tac Boston (USA)	USATB24	134	116	15	15	11	11	17	15	17	-18	12	3
17	USA 203; Kotyara	Helm	oleg Evdokimenko (RUS)	RUSOE1	135	117	18	8	-18	10	9	17	10	16	16	13
17	USA 203; Kotyara	Crew	serguei Chevtsov (ITA)	ITASC156	135	117	18	8	-18	10	9	17	10	16	16	13
17	USA 203; Kotyara	Crew	Andrea Fornaro (ITA)	ITAAF4	135	117	18	8	-18	10	9	17	10	16	16	13
18	USA 023; Disco Super Fly!	Helm	Devin Mcgranahan (USA)	USADM162	136	118	13	13	14	9	16	16	16	9	-18	12
18	USA 023; Disco Super Fly!	Bow	Rebecca Anderson (USA)	USARA57	136	118	13	13	14	9	16	16	16	9	-18	12
18	USA 023; Disco Super Fly!	Tactician	Brian Kamilar (USA)	USABK55	136	118	13	13	14	9	16	16	16	9	-18	12
18	USA 023; Disco Super Fly!	Spinnaker trimmer	Declan Mcgranagan (USA)	USADM213	136	118	13	13	14	9	16	16	16	9	-18	12

== Winners of individual stages ==
Stage	Date	Winning boat	Country	Skipper
1	9 December	Nika	Russia	Vladimir Prosikhin
2	9 December	Grinning Streak	Canada	Rhonda Joyce
3	10 December	Kuai	United States	Daniel Thielman
4	10 December	Honeybadger	United States	Harry Roepers
5	10 December	Kuai	United States	Daniel Thielman
6	11 December	Kuai	United States	Daniel Thielman
7	11 December	Russian Bogatyrs	Russia	Igor Rytov
8	11 December	Red Sky Sailing Team	United States	Paul Reilly
9	12 December	Ghostrider	United States	Jennifer Canestra
10	12 December	Honeybadger	United States	Harry Roepers
