= Melges 17 =

Sailboat class

Development
- Designer: Reichel/Pugh
- Location: United States
- Year: 2005
- Builder: Melges Performance Sailboats
- Role: Racer
- Name: Melges 17

Boat
- Crew: two
- Displacement: 335 lb (152 kg)
- Draft: 3.96 ft (1.21 m) with a bilgeboard down

Hull
- Type: monohull
- Construction: fiberglass
- LOA: 16.65 ft (5.07 m)
- Beam: 5.53 ft (1.69 m)

Hull appendages
- Keel: twin bilgeboards
- Rudder: transom-mounted rudder

Rig
- Rig type: Bermuda rig

Sails
- Sailplan: fractional rigged sloop
- Mainsail area: 154 sq ft (14.3 m^{2})
- Jib/genoa area: 66 sq ft (6.1 m^{2})
- Spinnaker area: 280 sq ft (26 m^{2})
- Upwind sail area: 220 sq ft (20 m^{2})
- Downwind sail area: 500 sq ft (46 m^{2})

The Melges 17 is an American scow-hulled sailing dinghy that was designed by Reichel/Pugh as a one-design racer and first built in 2005.

== Production ==
The design has built by Melges Performance Sailboats in the United States since 2005 and remains in production.

== Design ==
The design was conceived to provide a boat for youth sailors to move up to from the Laser, 420 and the X Boat, as well as for adults couples to sail.

The Melges 17 is a racing sailboat, with the hull built predominantly of fiberglass. It has a fractional sloop rig with carbon fiber spars; a scow hull; a transom-hung, aluminum extrusion rudder controlled by a tiller with an extension and twin retractable, aluminum extrusion bilgeboards. It displaces 335 lb (152 kg) and is normally sailed by two sailors, with an optimal crew weight of 265 to 350 lb (120 to 159 kg).

The boat has a draft of 3.96 ft (1.21 m) with a bilgeboard extended. With both bilgeboards retracted it can be operated in shallow water, beached or transported on a boat trailer.

For sailing downwind the design may be equipped with an asymmetrical spinnaker of 280 sq ft (26 m^{2}), flown from a retractable bowsprit.

== Operational history ==
The boat was at one time supported by a class club that organized racing events, the Melges 17 Class Association.

== See also ==
- List of sailing boat types

Similar sailboats

- M Scow
