= Melges 30 =

Sailboat class

Development
- Designer: Reichel/Pugh
- Location: United States
- Year: 1996
- No. built: 18
- Builder: Melges Performance Sailboats
- Role: Racer
- Name: Melges 30

Boat
- Displacement: 3,800 lb (1,724 kg)
- Draft: 7.00 ft (2.13 m) with keel down

Hull
- Type: monohull
- Construction: composite material
- LOA: 31.83 ft (9.70 m)
- LWL: 28.50 ft (8.69 m)
- Beam: 9.83 ft (3.00 m)
- Engine: Yanmar 260 18 hp (13 kW) diesel engine

Hull appendages
- Keel: lifting keel with weighted bulb
- Ballast: 1,600 lb (726 kg)
- Rudder: spade-type rudder

Rig
- Rig type: Bermuda rig
- I foretriangle height: 36.91 ft (11.25 m)
- J foretriangle base: 10.69 ft (3.26 m)
- P mainsail luff: 38.05 ft (11.60 m)
- E mainsail foot: 15.48 ft (4.72 m)

Sails
- Sailplan: fractional rigged sloop
- Mainsail area: 294.51 sq ft (27.361 m^{2})
- Jib/genoa area: 197.28 sq ft (18.328 m^{2})
- Spinnaker area: 1,180 sq ft (110 m^{2})
- Upwind sail area: 1,475 sq ft (137.0 m^{2})
- Downwind sail area: 1,180 sq ft (110 m^{2})

The Melges 30 is an American sailboat that was designed by Reichel/Pugh as a racer and first built in 1996.

The design was replaced in the product line by the Melges 32 in 2004.

== Production ==
The design was built by Melges Performance Sailboats in the United States, from 1996 until 1999, but only 18 boats were completed before production ended.

== Design ==
The boat was intended to form a one-design class and also be used for PHRF handicap racing.

The Melges 30 is a racing keelboat, built predominantly of fiberglass and carbon fiber. It has a fractional sloop rig, a plumb stem, a reverse transom, an internally mounted spade-type rudder controlled by a tiller with an extension and a lifting keel with a weighted bulb. It displaces 3,800 lb (1,724 kg) and carries 1,600 lb (726 kg) of lead ballast in the keel bulb. The cockpit is 15 ft (4.6 m) long.

The design made extensive use of carbon fiber components, including the mast, rudder, the keel fin and bowsprit.

The boat has a draft of 7.00 ft (7.00 ft) with the keel extended and 4.00 ft (1.22 m) with it retracted, allowing operation in shallow water or ground transportation on a trailer.

The boat is fitted with a Japanese Yanmar 260 diesel engine of 18 hp (13 kW) powering a saildrive for docking and maneuvering. The fuel tank holds 8 U.S. gallons (30 L; 6.7 imp gal).

For sailing downwind the design may be equipped with an asymmetrical spinnaker of 1,180 sq ft (110 m^{2}), which is flown from the articulating carbon fiber bowsprit.

The design has a hull speed of 7.15 kn (13.24 km/h).

== Operational history ==
In a 2000 review naval architect Robert Perry wrote, "the Melges group and the Reichel/Pugh team have come out with a 30-foot version of the 24. For local fleets this boat may be even harder to deal with than the 24. You could always excuse the 24 as it blew by you with, "It's just a big dinghy." But this 30-footer, with its engine and the addition of lifelines and pulpits, almost looks like a normal boat and will give PHRF raters a fit. Actually, it's in a class of its own. I can think of no other boat that is designed with this particular balance of parameters. In a nutshell, this design appears aimed at providing the fastest monohull ride around without the fear of capsizing."

== See also ==
- List of sailing boat types
