= Melges 14 =

Sailboat class

Development
- Designer: Reichel/Pugh
- Location: United States
- Year: 2016
- Builder: Melges Performance Sailboats
- Role: Racer
- Name: Melges 14

Boat
- Crew: One
- Displacement: 120 lb (54 kg)
- Draft: 4.5 ft (1.4 m) with daggerboard down

Hull
- Type: monohull
- Construction: fiberglass
- LOA: 14.00 ft (4.27 m)
- LWL: 14.00 ft (4.27 m)
- Beam: 5.20 ft (1.58 m)

Hull appendages
- Keel: daggerboard
- Rudder: transom-mounted rudder

Rig
- Rig type: Catboat rig

Sails
- Sailplan: Catboat
- Mainsail area: 97.00 sq ft (9.012 m^{2})
- Total sail area: 97.00 sq ft (9.012 m^{2})

The Melges 14 is an American planing sailboat that was designed by Reichel/Pugh as a one-design racer and first built in 2016.

The design was named Sailing World magazine's "Best Dinghy" of 2016.

== Production ==
The design has been built by Melges Performance Sailboats in the United States since 2016 and remains in production.

== Design ==
The Melges 14 is a racing sailing dinghy, built predominantly of PVC-cored fiberglass. It is raced with one sailor but can carry two adults. It has a catboat rig with a carbon fiber, two-piece mast and single-piece boom. The sail is made from Mylar. The hull has a plumb stem and a plumb, open transom, a transom-hung rudder controlled by a tiller with an extension and a retractable daggerboard. It displaces 130 lb (59 kg).

The boat has a draft of 4.5 ft (1.4 m) with the daggerboard extended. Removing the daggerboard allows operation in shallow water, beaching, or ground transportation on a trailer or automobile roof.

There are three different sized sails for different crew weights or wind conditions. The gold rig has an area of 97 sq ft (9.0 m^{2}), the blue 85 sq ft (7.9 m^{2}) and the red 58.8 sq ft (5.46 m^{2}). The smaller sail sizes use shorter mast top sections.

== Operational history ==
In a 2019 review in Sailing World Dave Reed wrote, "the Melges 14, the judges agreed, is a righteous challenger to the Laser's kingdom. It was recognized as the best dinghy in 2016, and it's a boat that will make you want to drop everything, rig up and go sailing when the breeze is on."

== See also ==
- List of sailing boat types
