= A Scow =

Sailboat class

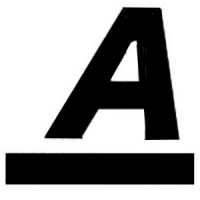

Development
- Designer: John O. Johnson
- Location: United States
- Year: 1901
- Builders: Johnson Boat Works; Melges Performance Sailboats
- Role: racer
- Name: A Scow

Boat
- Crew: at least five
- Displacement: 1,850 lb (839 kg)
- Draft: 4.00 ft (1.22 m) with a centerboard down

Hull
- Type: monohull
- Construction: wood or fiberglass
- LOA: 38.00 ft (11.58 m)
- Beam: 8.25 ft (2.51 m)

Hull appendages
- Keel: dual centerboards
- Rudders: dual, spade-type rudders

Rig
- Rig type: Bermuda rig

Sails
- Sailplan: fractional rigged sloop
- Mainsail area: 350 sq ft (33 m^{2})
- Jib/genoa area: 150 sq ft (14 m^{2})
- Spinnaker area: 1,200 sq ft (110 m^{2})
- Total sail area: 500 sq ft (46 m^{2})

The A Scow is an American scow-hulled sailing dinghy that was designed by John O. Johnson as a racer and first built in 1901.

The A Scow design was developed into the V38, by Victory by Design, LLC in 2005.

== Production ==
The design was initially built by Johnson Boat Works in White Bear Lake, Minnesota United States, but that company closed in 1998 and production passed to Melges Performance Sailboats, who continue to build it.

== Design ==
The A Scow traces its origins back to a Johnson-designed prototype in 1896. Over time the class has changed and evolved into essentially a one design class today. At 38.00 ft (11.58 m) length overall, the design is the largest scow raced today and is one of the largest dinghies produced.

The A Scow is a racing sailboat, with the early versions built from wood and the more recent ones built predominantly of fiberglass. It has a fractional sloop with a masthead spinnaker. The hull is a scow design with a raised counter, vertical transom; dual spade-type rudders controlled by dual tillers and dual retractable centerboards. It displaces 1,850 lb (839 kg) and carries no ballast.

The boat has a draft of 4.00 ft (1.22 m) with a centerboard extended and 1.00 ft (0.30 m) with both retracted, allowing beaching or ground transportation on a trailer.

For sailing the design is equipped with an asymmetrical spinnaker of 1,200 sq ft (110 m^{2}), flown from a retractable bowsprit.

The design is raced with a crew of at least five sailors and normally has a total of six or seven crew members to help balance the boat.

== Operational history ==
The boat is supported by a national class club, the National Class A Scow Association, which regulates the class and organizes races. The A Scow is mostly raced on lakes in the midwestern United States.

A film was made about racing A Scows, The Ultimate Ride, by racer Peter Crawford.

A review in Sailing World in 2006 by Gary Jobson, wrote, "these boats sail best when heeled more than 20 degrees, and in a breeze, it takes a lot of courage to do this. The boat rocks up and you feel as if you're about to be catapulted out of the cockpit. But a subtle tug on the tiller, a slight ease of the main and spinnaker sheets, and zingo, you're sailing at 25 knots. There's no crew weight limit, so depending on the wind strength, 5 to 7 crew can be piled on the rail with sailors rotating on or off in between races."

== See also ==
- List of sailing boat types
