= Melges 40 =

Sailboat class

Development
- Designer: Botin Partners
- Location: United States
- Year: 2017
- Builder: Melges Performance Sailboats
- Role: Racer
- Name: Melges 40

Boat
- Crew: 8-9
- Displacement: 7,165 lb (3,250 kg)
- Draft: 10.50 ft (3.20 m)

Hull
- Type: monohull
- Construction: epoxy infused carbon fiber with a foam core
- LOA: 39.35 ft (11.99 m)
- LWL: 36.42 ft (11.10 m)
- Beam: 11.58 ft (3.53 m)
- Engine: 20 hp (15 kW) diesel engine

Hull appendages
- Keel: canting fin keel with weighted bulb
- Ballast: 2,646 lb (1,200 kg)
- Rudder: spade-type rudder

Rig
- Rig type: Bermuda rig

Sails
- Sailplan: fractional rigged sloop
- Mainsail area: 775 sq ft (72.0 m^{2})
- Jib/genoa area: 527 sq ft (49.0 m^{2})
- Gennaker area: 2,153 sq ft (200.0 m^{2})
- Upwind sail area: 1,302 sq ft (121.0 m^{2})
- Downwind sail area: 2,928 sq ft (272.0 m^{2})

The Melges 40 is an American sailboat that was designed by the Spanish design firm of Botin Partners as a one-design racer aimed at the European Grand Prix yacht racing circuit and first built in 2017.

The design was named Yachts and Yachting magazine's 2017 Keelboat of the Year.

== Production ==
The design is built by Premier Composite Technologies in Dubai, United Arab Emirates, for Melges Performance Sailboats of the United States. It has been in production since 2017.

The company sells the boat with an optional turnkey program whereby the owner pays a monthly fee and the company manages the boat's maintenance, technical requirements and logistics, allowing the owner and crew to "simply show up and race".

== Design ==
The Melges 40 is a racing keelboat, built predominantly of epoxy infused carbon fiber with a foam core. It has a fractional sloop rig with a square-topped mainsail. The hull has a plumb stem, an open plumb transom, an internally mounted spade-type rudder controlled by a tiller and an electrically actuated canting fin keel with a weighted bulb. The keel may be canted up to 45° to either side to provide additional righting moment with a lighter ballast weight or for operation in shallow water. The boat displaces 7,165 lb (3,250 kg) and carries 2,646 lb (1,200 kg) of ballast, of which 2,425 lb (1,100 kg) is in the bulb.

The boat has a draft of 10.50 ft (3.20 m) with the canting keel fully extended.

The boat is fitted with a diesel engine of 20 hp (15 kW) with a retractable propeller, for docking and maneuvering. The fuel tank holds 11 U.S. gallons (42 L; 9.2 imp gal).

For sailing downwind the design may be equipped with an asymmetrical gennaker of 2,153 sq ft (200.0 m^{2}), flown from a retractable carbon fiber bowsprit.

The design has a hull speed of 8.09 kn (14.98 km/h) and is intended to be sailed by a crew of eight to nine sailors.

== Operational history ==
In a 2016 review in Sailing World, Dave Reed wrote, "the boat is technical, yes, for it will be all carbon and epoxy, with a canting keel and yards of sail area aloft, but it also comes with a class-management plan that's founded upon delivering a turnkey experience for owners. That'll include class management, dedicated race officers, and assistance with logistics."

In a 2019 review in Yachting World, noted, "The Melges 40 is something of a slow-burn success story. As the only canting keel, all carbon, strict one-design grand prix racer it remains unique. It is very much an elite, niche class. It was never targeted at the wider horizons of the one-design production racing class, such as is the new Melges 37. So far it appeals only to a small cross-section of experienced, competitive owners who want electric downwind speed, and quick and efficient upwind sailing. The canting keel adds a whole new dimension to windward-leeward racing. Melges 40 owners want to go quicker than anything else of a similar size, and to travel and race internationally with their team. They are owners who might otherwise be in the TP52 fleet, but perhaps don't want to employ full-time shore crew or to be running a development programme."

== See also ==
- List of sailing boat types
