= Johnson 18 =

Sailing dinghy

Boat
- Crew: Two
- Draft: .127 m (5.0 in); 1.37 m (4 ft 6 in)

Hull
- Hull weight: ~218 kg (481 lb)
- LOA: 5.54 m (18 ft 2 in)
- LWL: 5.05 m (16 ft 7 in)
- Beam: 2.03 m (6 ft 8 in)

Rig
- Mast height: 7.08 m (23.2 ft)

Sails
- Mainsail area: 127.7 sq ft
- Jib/genoa area: 56.6 sq ft
- Spinnaker area: 256 sq ft

Racing
- D-PN: 86.1

The Johnson 18 is an 18-foot (5.5 m) sailing dinghy designed by Rodger Martin. Although it is no longer produced, Johnson Boat Works fabricated over 100 of these sport boats before closing its doors in 1998.

== History ==
Johnson Boat Works had built mostly scow designs on White Bear Lake, Minnesota since its founding in 1896. However, in 1994 Rodger Martin Yacht Designs was hired to finalize the Johnson 18 design concept. 75 Johnson 18's were built in the first year and a half of production. The nationwide dealer distribution of this boat was a departure from the normal direct sales of the Johnson Boat Works. As a result, Johnson 18's are located all over the United States, though fleet sizes remain relatively low. In 1998 Johnson Boat Works was sold and its assets were divided. Melges Boat Works took control of most scow molds, while Catalina Yachts bought the Johnson 18 molds as well as several un-finished Johnson 18 hulls and fittings. Very few Johnson 18's were produced after the sale and Catalina Yachts retains control of the class molds.

== Design ==
The hull design is low to the water and marginally wide for its length. The transom is open making the cockpit self bailing. Cockpit edges are rounded and comfortable to hike on in conjunction with hiking straps for each crew member. The bowsprit is a retractable carbon fiber pole for the asymmetrical spinnaker, which is launched from an attached bag on the port side. The centerboard boasts an impressive 4-foot (1.2 m) draft when down and retracts by swinging aft on a pivot. The rig is supported by one set of upper side stays and one set of lower side stays, along with a forestay integrated into the roller furling jib. There is no backstay, and as a result the stern remains quite clear most of the time. Controls for the cunningham and boomvang are led back to the skipper under a removable spine that keeps them from becoming tangled in Jib Spinnaker sheets.

== Sailing ==
Sailing the Johnson 18 is fairly easy, because of its wide, stable design. It will plane in under 10 knots of wind, however it will do so much more easily above that threshold. The asymmetrical spinnaker makes reaching and broad reaching very fast, however heading straight downwind tends to be much slower. This is a normal result of flying an asymmetrical spinnaker without an articulating pole.

== Portsmouth Comparisons (2002) ==
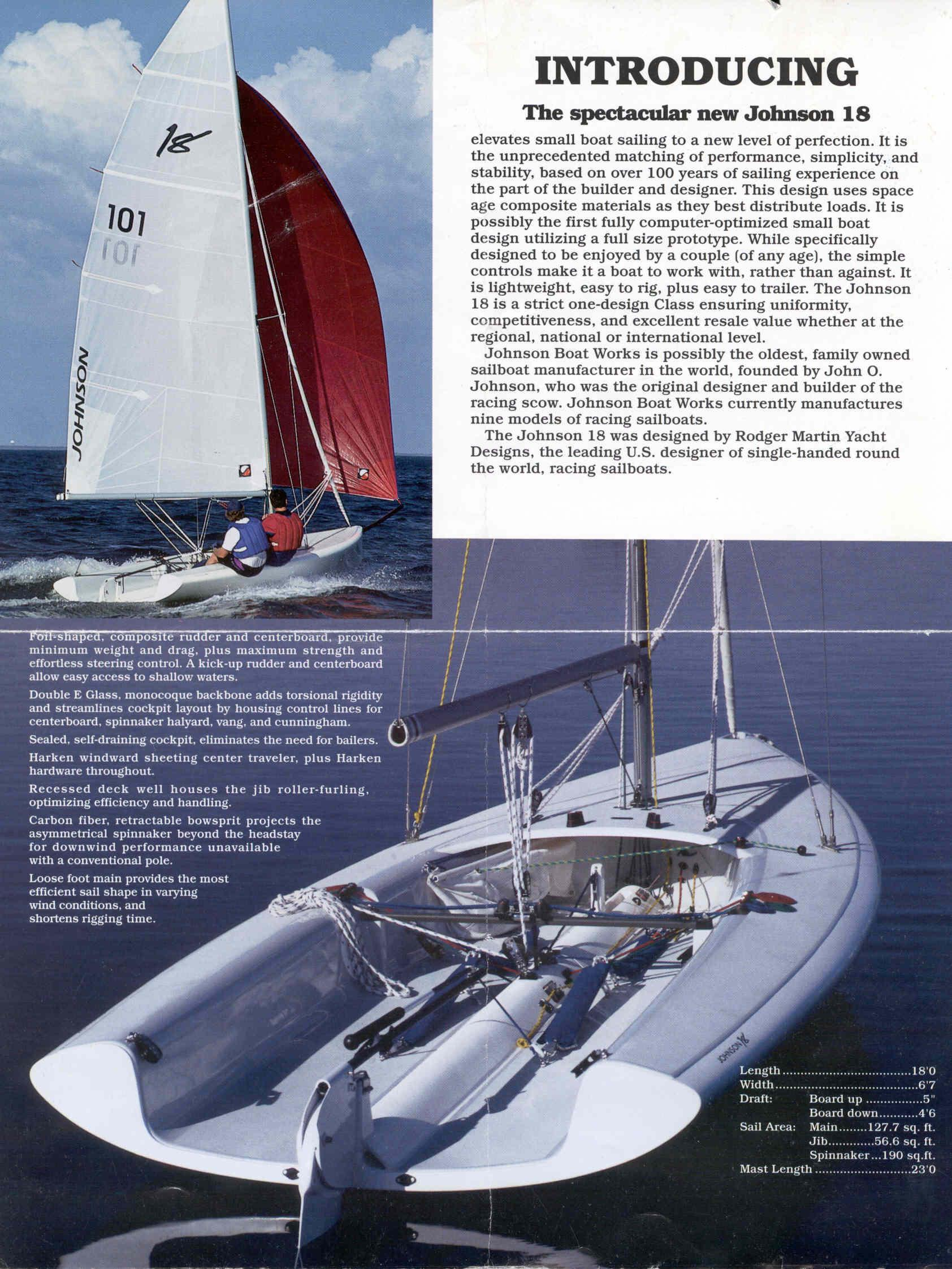
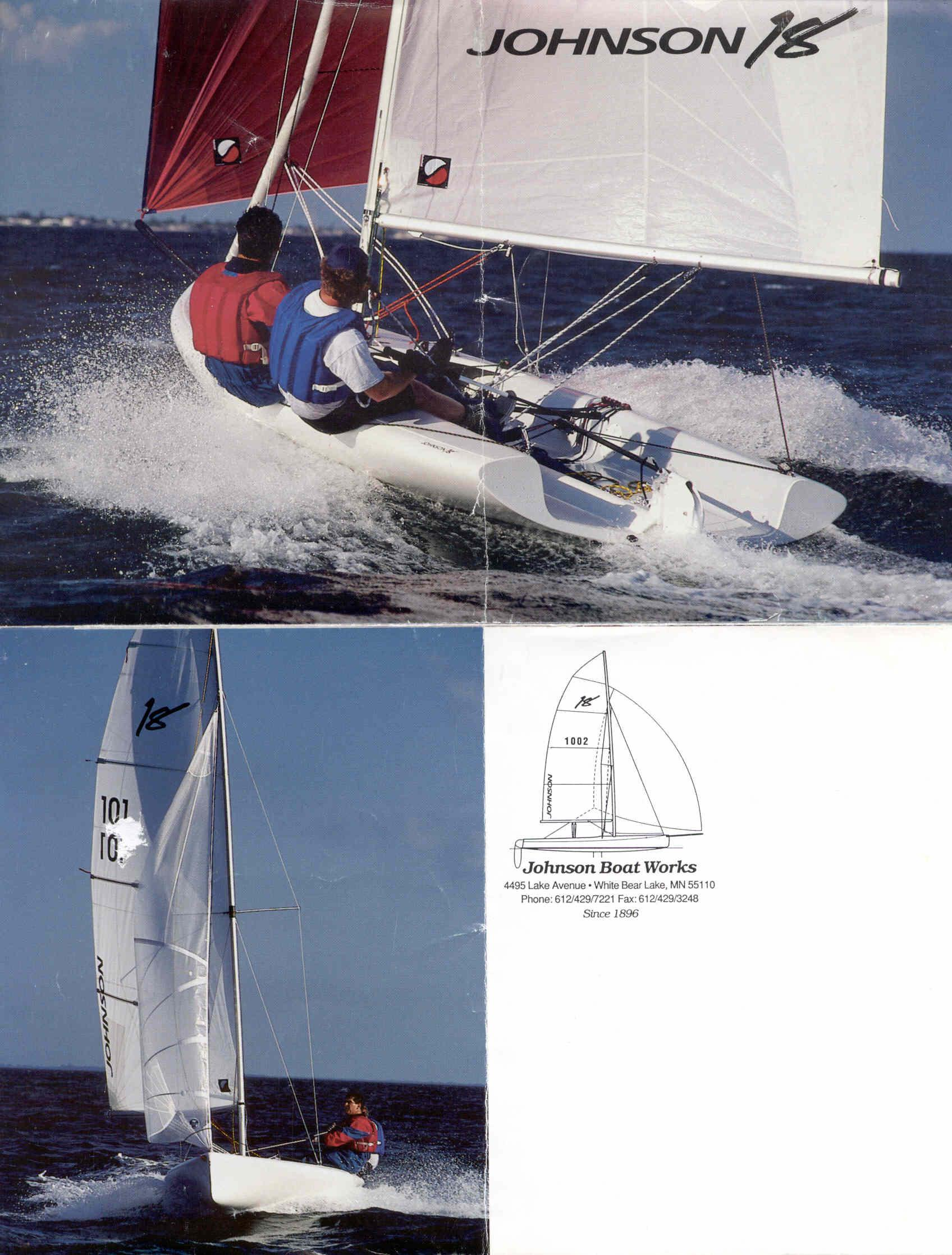
Two brochure pages advertising the Johnson 18
- 505 - 80.2
- Flying Dutchman - 80.2
- Thistle - 83.0
- M-20 Scow - 84.1
- Highlander - 84.6
- Johnson 18 - 86.1
- Y-Flyer - 87.9
- Buccaneer 18 - 87.1
- Lightning - 87.7
- MC Scow - 88.7
- M-16 Scow - 89.8
- Finn - 90.5
- Laser - 91.4
- JY 15 - 91.3
- Coronado 15 - 91.9
- Snipe - 92.4

Portsmouth yardstick explanation
