= O'pen Skiff =

Sailboat class

O'PEN Skiff
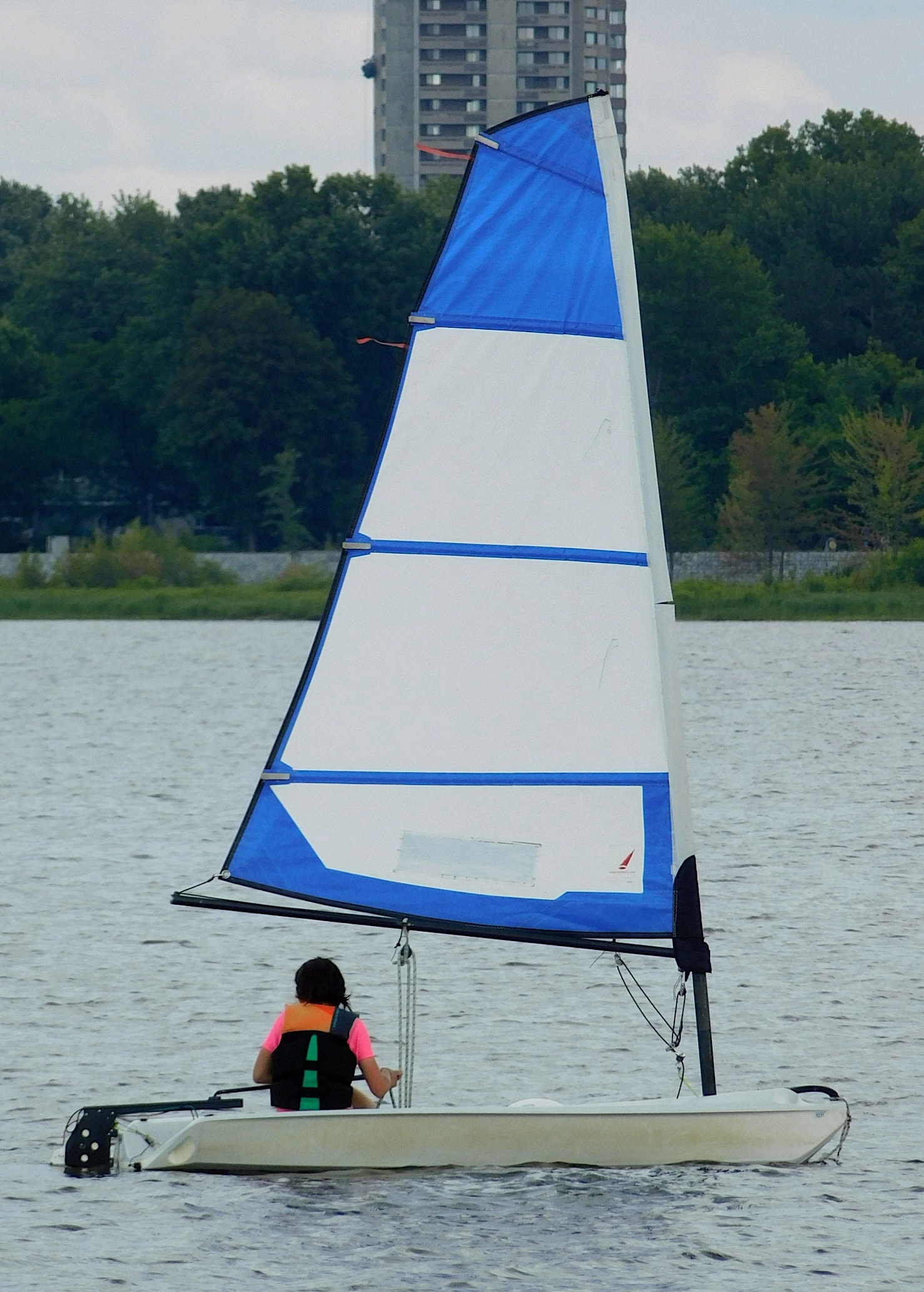

Development
- Designer: Vitali Design
- Location: France
- Year: 2006-2025
- Builder: Melges Performance Sailboats
- Role: One design racer sail training
- Name: O'PEN Skiff

Boat
- Crew: One
- Displacement: 99 lb (45 kg)

Hull
- Type: monohull
- Construction: polyethylene
- LOA: 9.00 ft (2.74 m)
- LWL: 7.17 ft (2.19 m)
- Beam: 3.58 ft (1.09 m)

Hull appendages
- Keel: daggerboard
- Rudder: transom-mounted rudder

Rig
- Rig type: cat rig

Sails
- Sailplan: catboat
- Mainsail area: 48.44 sq ft (4.500 m^{2})
- Total sail area: 48.44 sq ft (4.500 m^{2})

The O'PEN Skiff, or O'pen Bic, is a sailing dinghy that was designed by Vitali Design of Italy for children's sail training and as a one design racer. It was first built in 2006.

The design is a World Sailing international class.

The boat was originally marketed by the manufacturer BIC as the O'PEN Bic, but was renamed the O'PEN Skiff in 2019 with the acquisition of Bic Sport by the Estonian company TAHE Outdoors.

== Production ==
Originally produced by Bic Sport of France starting in 2006, the design is now built by TAHE Outdoors in France and remains in production.

== Design ==
The O'PEN Skiff is a single-handed training and racing sailboat. The hull is built of thermoformed, molded polyethylene, with a two-section carbon mast and aluminum boom. It has a catboat rig, with a K.Film polyester, fully-battened mainsail or a Dacron main sail. a raked stem, an open transom; a transom-hung, composite epoxy rudder, controlled by a tiller with an extension and a retractable, composite epoxy daggerboard. The boat displaces 99 lb (45 kg) and may be transported on a car top or on a trailer.

== Operational history ==
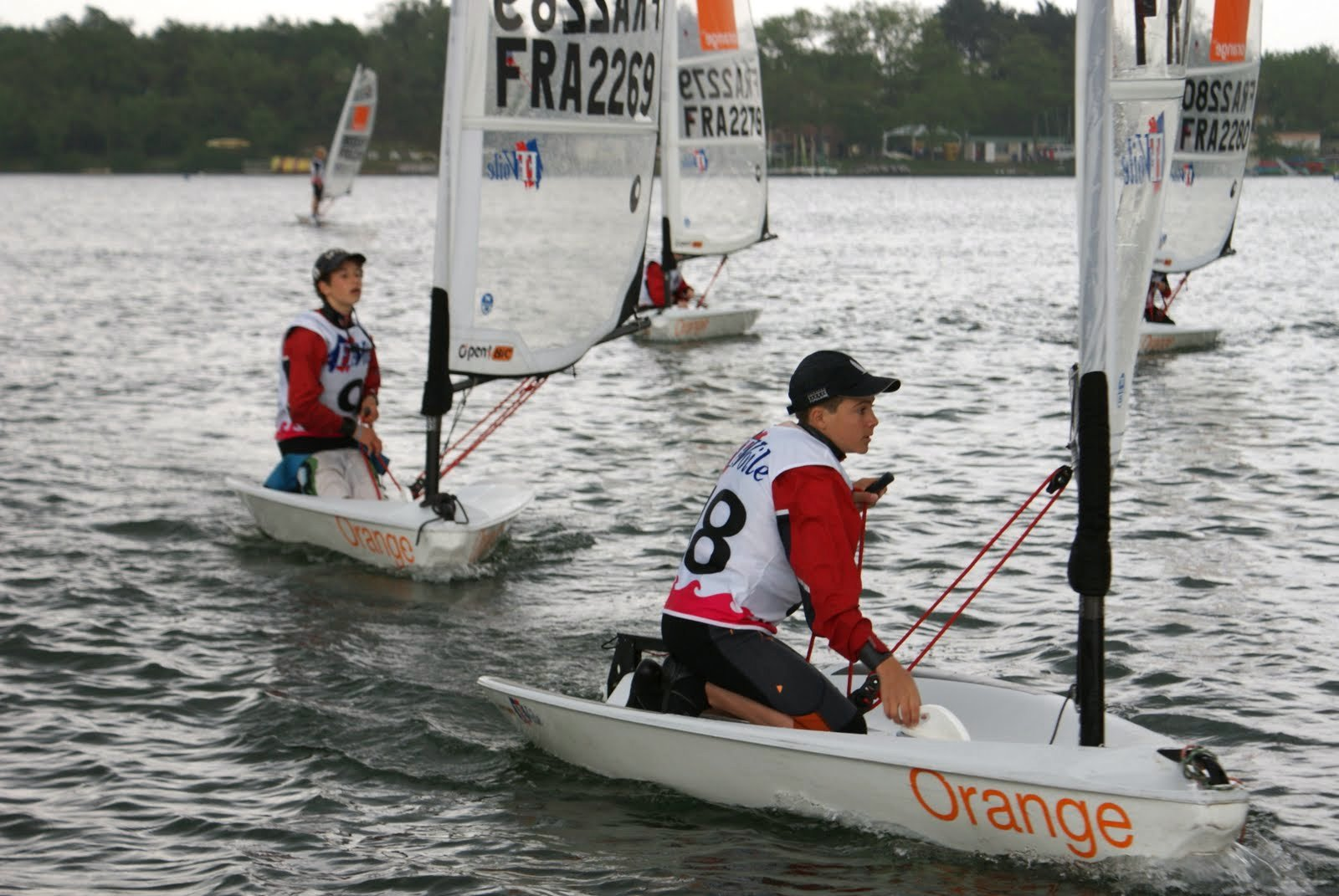
O'PEN Skiff sailors participate in a light wind race in France

The design is widely used by hundreds of sailing clubs for training children to sail.

Russell Coutts, World Champion New Zealand sailor and America’s Cup Winner, said of the design, "the O’pen Skiff is a fantastic boat for young sailors to experience the joy of sailing. It is fast, exciting and fun to sail yet simple to rig and maintain. Many of the skills learnt in the O’pen Skiff will be easily transferred to other boats as sailors evolve and progress onto other forms of sailing."

== See also ==
- List of sailing boat types

Similar sailboats

- Optimist (dinghy)
