= Janesville station =

Former Amtrak station in Wisconsin

Janesville, WI
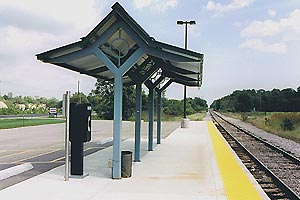
- Janesville station in August 2001

General information
- Location: 3136 East County Road O Janesville, Wisconsin
- Coordinates: 42.6651°N 88.9794°W
- Line: Wisconsin and Southern
- Platforms: 1 side platform

History
- Opened: April 15, 2000
- Closed: September 23, 2001

Former services
Preceding station	Amtrak	Following station
Terminus	Lake Country Limited	Lake Geneva toward Chicago
Location

Janesville station in Janesville, Wisconsin was built in 2000, to serve as the terminus for the Lake Country Limited. Passenger service ceased only a year later, in 2001. As of 2021, nothing remains of the station.

The condition of the tracks meant that the train stopped two miles from downtown Janesville, because to go farther would have added 20 minutes. Instead, Amtrak created a temporary station on the east side of the city in an area formerly used for grain loading. The station's amenities consisted of a passenger platform, lighting, and a gravel parking lot.

Originally, service to the station was daily, but this was reduced to weekends only in March 2001, before service completely ceased in September 2001.
