= George Szabo III =

American Star class sailor (born 1970)

George M. Szabo III
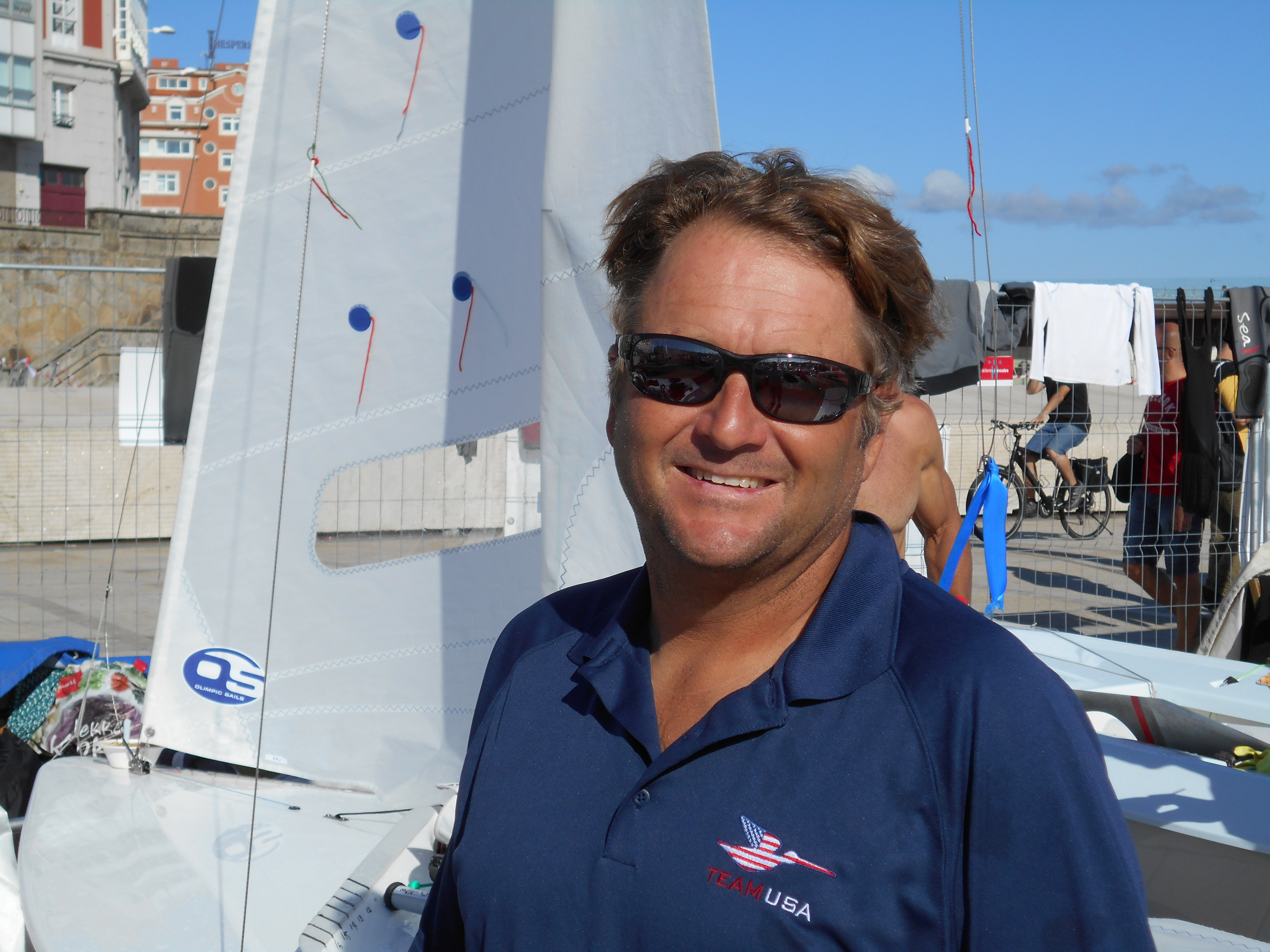

Personal information
- Nationality: United States
- Born: Philadelphia, Pennsylvania

Sailing career
- Sport: Sailing
- College team: San Diego State University
- Club: San Diego Yacht Club
- Classes: Snipe, Star

George M. Szabo III (born 1970 in Philadelphia, Pennsylvania) is an American Star class sailor. He won the 2009 Star World Championships together with Rick Peters, and was second at the 2003 Snipe World Championships in Borstahusen.

He was also 4 times North American champion (1998, 1999, 2000 and 2003) U.S. National champion (1997, 1998, 1999, 2000 and 2005) in Snipe and 3 times US Sailing Champion of Champions.
