= Melges Performance Sailboats =

Sailboat manufacturer

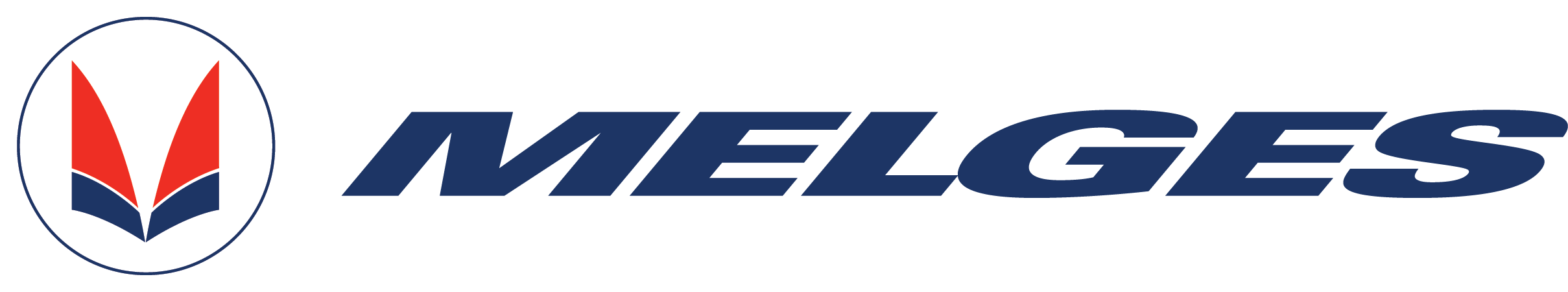

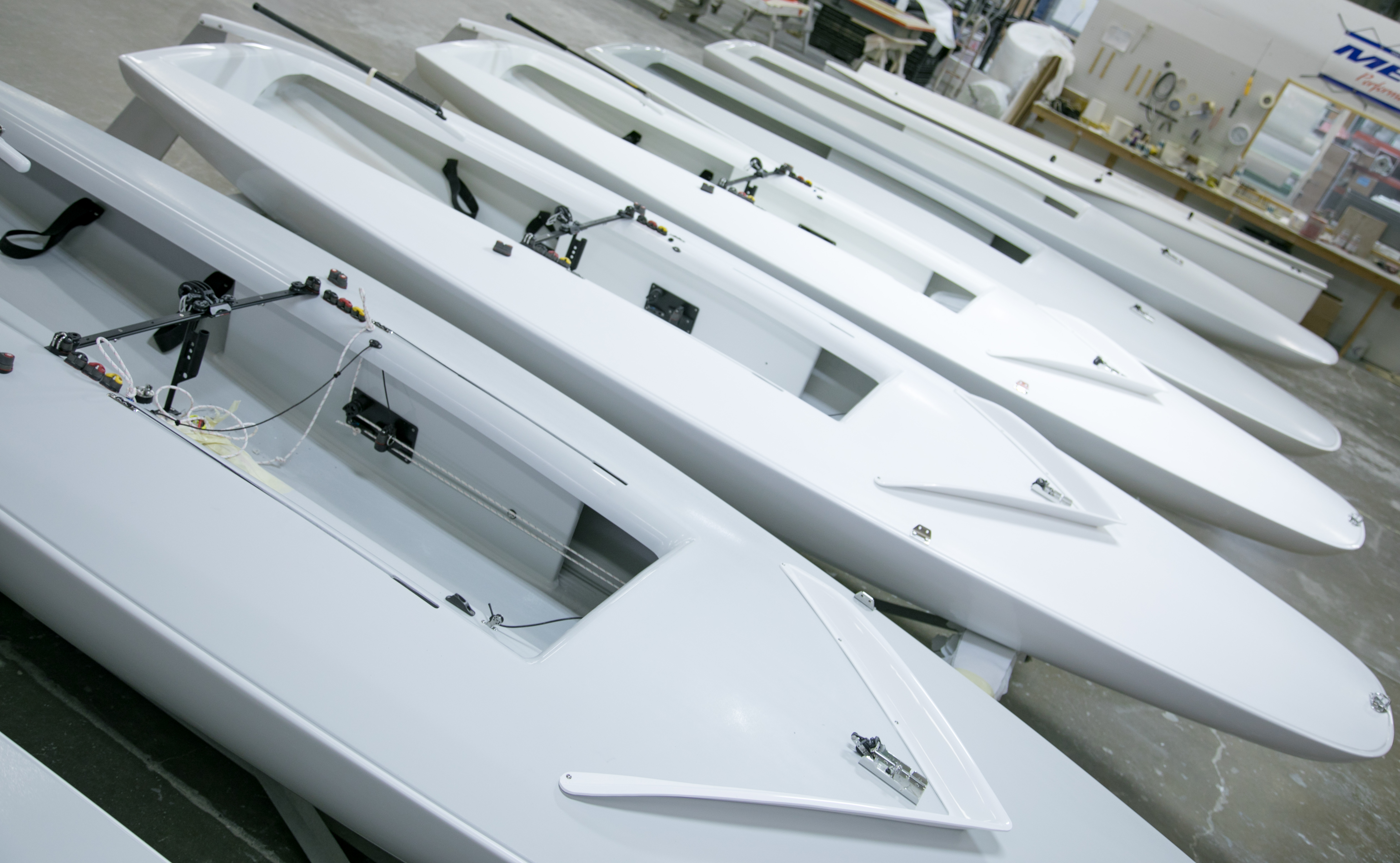
- MC Scows being built inside the Melges Headquarters in Zenda, Wisconsin
- Company type: Privately held company
- Industry: Boat building
- Founded: 1945
- Headquarters: Zenda, Wisconsin, United States
- Key people: CEO: Harry Melges III; President: Andy Burdick
- Products: Sailboats
- Website: melges.com

Melges Performance Sailboats, is an American sailboat manufacturer founded by Harry Melges, father of former Olympic sailor Buddy Melges.

Melges Boat Works, Inc. was founded by Harry C. Melges, Sr. in 1945. The company was originally named Mel-Ban Boat Works and became Melges Boatworks in 1948. The company became a leader in scow boat design in the U.S., particularly in the Midwest. Harry, Sr. initially built boats out of wood.

The company's headquarters is in Zenda, Wisconsin. The current CEO is Harry Melges III and President is Andy Burdick.

Reichel/Pugh designed many of the Melges-produced boats, including the Melges 14, 15, 17, 20, 24, 30, and 32.

== Boats ==
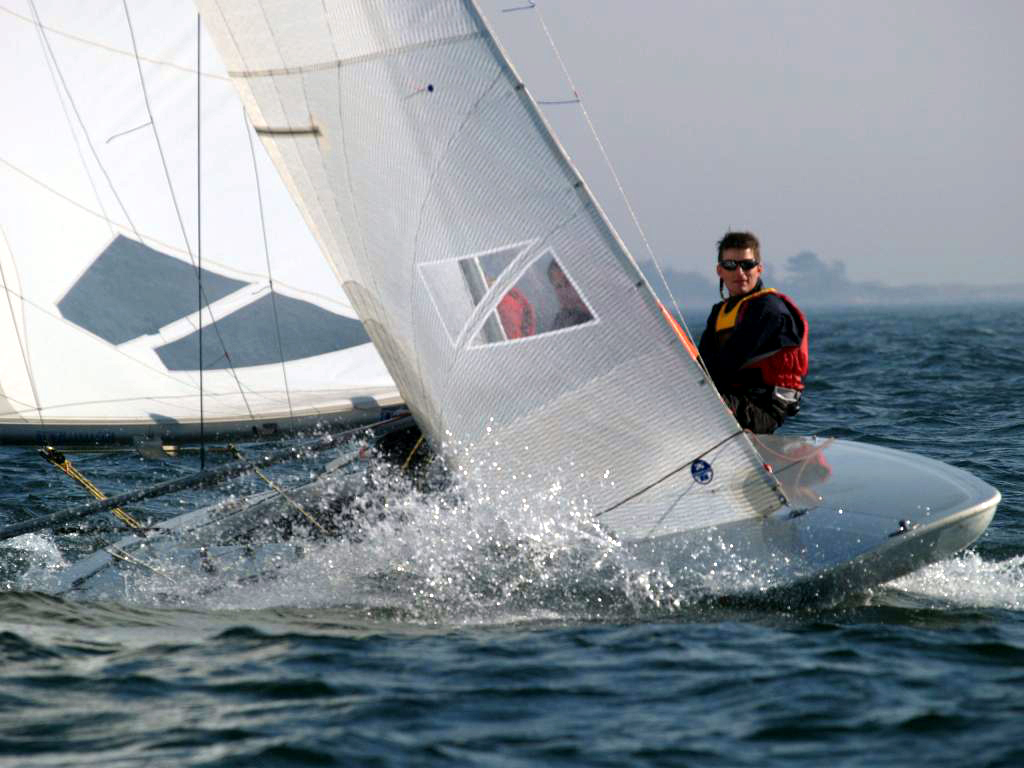
E Scow

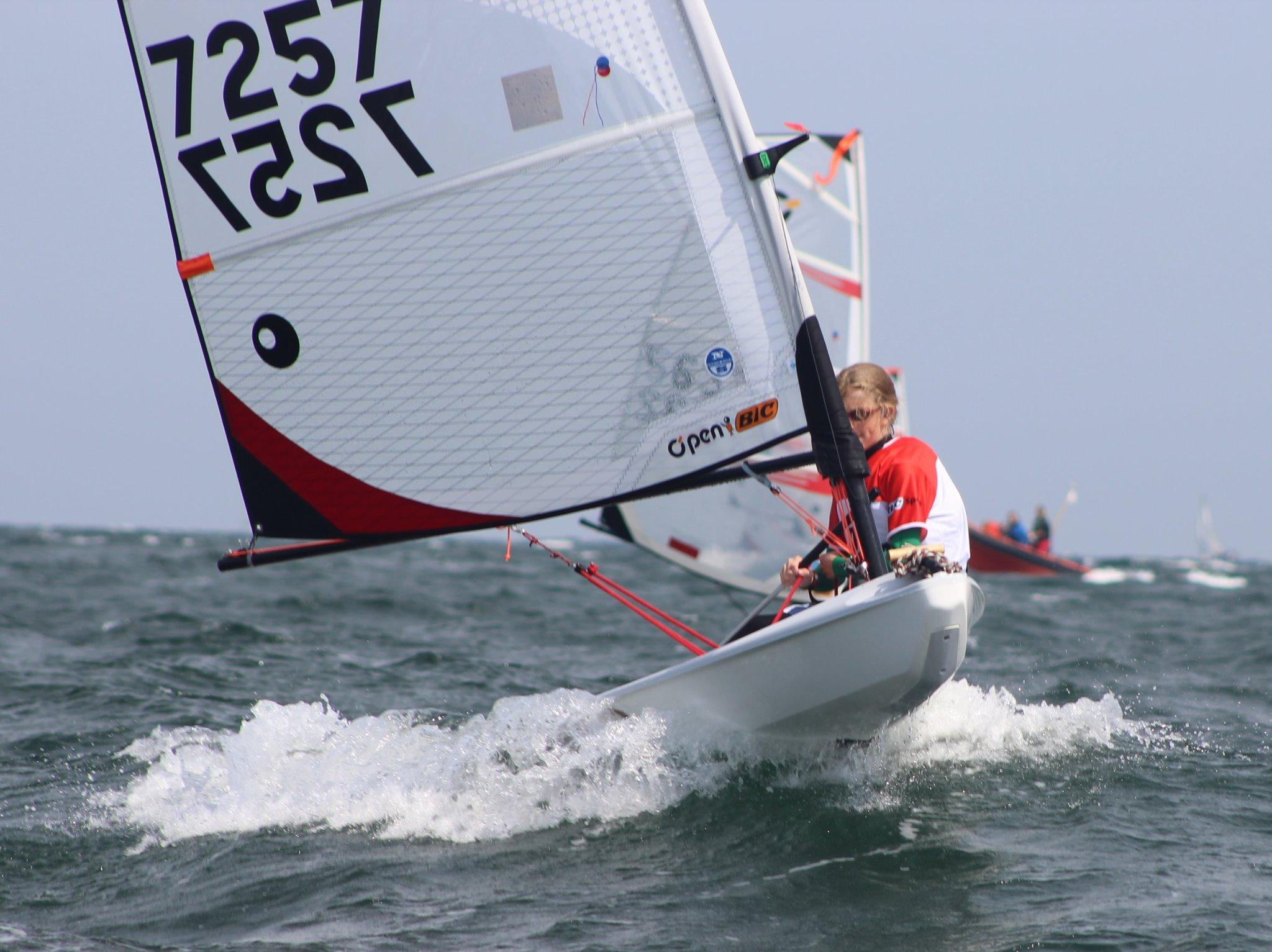
O'Pen Skiff

Boats produced by the company include:

- A Scow
- C Scow
- E Scow
- M-16 Scow
- MC Scow
- Melges 20
- Melges 14
- Melges 15
- Melges 17
- Melges 24
- Melges 30
- Melges 32
- Melges 40
- O'Pen Skiff
- X Boat

== See also ==
- List of sailboat designers and manufacturers
