= Scowl (disambiguation) =

A scowl is another word for frown.

Scowl may also refer to:

== Characters ==
- Scowl (Transformers), one of the Monster Pretenders in the Transformers universe
- Scowl, name of an owl in the 1989 film Happily Ever After

== Music ==
- Scowl (band), American hardcore punk band
- "Scowl", 2015 song by The Story So Far from The Story So Far

== See also ==
- Scowle, a hollow in the ground
- Unicode U+2322 (⌢) FROWN, see Miscellaneous Technical (Unicode block)
