= X Boat =

Sailboat class

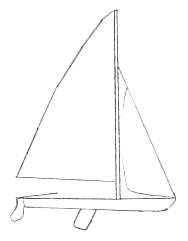

Development
- Designer: John O. Johnson
- Location: United States
- Year: 1932
- Builders: Johnson Boat Works; Melges Performance Sailboats
- Role: One-design racer
- Name: X Boat

Boat
- Crew: two
- Displacement: 470 lb (213 kg)
- Draft: 2.58 ft (0.79 m) with centerboard down

Hull
- Type: Monohull
- Construction: Wood or fiberglass
- LOA: 16.00 ft (4.88 m)
- LWL: 14.50 ft (4.42 m)
- Beam: 6.08 ft (1.85 m)

Hull appendages
- Keel: centerboard
- Rudder: transom-mounted rudder

Rig
- Rig type: Bermuda rig

Sails
- Sailplan: Fractional rigged sloop
- Mainsail area: 85.00 sq ft (7.897 m^{2})
- Jib/genoa area: 24.75 sq ft (2.299 m^{2})
- Total sail area: 109.75 sq ft (10.196 m^{2})

Racing
- D-PN: 97.7

The X Boat, also called the Cub, is an American sailing dinghy that was designed by John O. Johnson as a one-design racer and first built in 1932.

== Production ==
The design was built by Johnson Boat Works starting in 1932 and later by Melges Performance Sailboats in the United States. Johnson Boat Works went out of business in 1998, but the boat remains in production by Melges.

== Design ==
The X Boat is a simple, sail training and racing sailboat, intended for junior sailors under 16 years of age. Originally constructed of wood, it is now built predominantly of fiberglass, with wooden trim. It has a fractional sloop with aluminum spars, a spooned raked stem, an angled transom, a rounded, transom-hung rudder controlled by a tiller fitted with a tiller extension and it has a retractable centerboard. It displaces 470 lb (213 kg).

The boat has a draft of 2.58 ft (0.79 m) with the centerboard extended. The boat can be transported on a trailer.

For sailing the design is equipped with a boom vang, a stern-mounted mainsheet traveler and two sets of hiking straps.

The design has a Portsmouth Yardstick racing average handicap of 97.7 and is normally raced with a crew of two sailors.

== Operational history ==
The class is supported by the Inland Lake Yachting Association, which organizes racing regattas. The annual association championship for the class often attracts over 100 boats to compete.

In a 1994 review Richard Sherwood wrote, "The X Boat was designed as a low-performance training boat for junior programs. With the exception of the boom vang, sail control is minimal so as to emphasize handling skills ... Since 1984 the Portsmouth Number has dropped dramatically."

== See also ==
- List of sailing boat types
