= John O. Johnson =

Minnesota boat builder

- Born: January 10, 1875; Oslo, Norway
- Died: February 1963 (aged 88)

John O. Johnson (January 10, 1875 - February 1963) was a Norwegian-born, American boat builder, early aviator, and inventor in White Bear Lake, Minnesota.

== Early life and boat building ==
Johnson was born in Oslo, Norway. His mother died when he was seven years old and his father sent him to live with relatives for his room and board. At age fifteen he worked on a coastal steamer that delivered supplies to coastal villages. In 1893, he emigrated to America, traveling to White Bear Lake, Minnesota where he lived and worked for a fellow Norwegian, Gus Amundson. In 1896, he started his own boat-building business, Johnson Boat Works, building boats for members of the White Bear Yacht Club. In those days, White Bear Lake was a resort town with hotels, parks, steamboats and boat rentals. Twenty-five trains a day came here from St. Paul bringing visitors to enjoy the lake.

John's first major success was the Minnezitka a 38 ft. scow design sailboat that won the championship on the lake in 1900. This boat was said to be beginning of the speedy scow design that skimmed over the water. A model of this boat was later displayed at the Smithsonian Museum. The Johnson Boat Works became well known nationally as well as in Canada and foreign countries. The 38 ft. scow design became the class A-boat. Later racing classes included the 32 ft. B-boat, the 28 ft. E-boat, the 20 ft. C-boat and others.

== Aviation ==
In addition to designing and building sailboats, Johnson was also an inventor. He was the first aviator in Minnesota to achieve a take off from a level surface in a powered airplane. He built his airplane in his back yard and flew it from the frozen lake. From the St. Paul Dispatch January 26, 2010: "WHITE BEAR MAN FLIES OVER LAKE. Inventor, Johnson, soars about 200 feet, then engine misses fire, and he falls." The crash landing destroyed the fragile aircraft. Johnson built a second airplane, but did not have the funds to buy a suitable engine. His wife told him that flying airplanes was too dangerous, ending his attempts.

== Snowplow invention ==
In the 1920s, local road crews were unable to clear the roads of snow during winters with heavy snowfalls. Car owners put their vehicles away and used horse drawn sleighs for travel or used the train to get into the city. Johnson designed and built a rotary snowplow in the winter of 1921. He asked a lawyer, who lived on the lake, to get a patent. Johnson paid for the patent work by building the lawyer a large iceboat. This snowplow was very successful, and some Minneapolis businessmen bought the patent and built the Snow King plows. With the money from the sale of the snowplow business, Johnson was able to enlarge and modernize his boat works business.

== Death ==
Johnson died in February 1963. He had earlier given over the business to his three sons, Milton, Iver and Walter. The Johnson Boat Works continued until it was sold in 1998 after 102 years of business.

== Boat designs ==
- A Scow
- C Scow
- X Boat

== Related reading ==
- Kathryn Strand Koutsky; Linda Koutsky (2006). Minnesota Vacation Days: An Illustrated History. Minnesota Historical Society. pp. 151–. ISBN 978-0-87351-526-9.
- Carl Bigelow Drake (1961) History of The White Bear Yacht Club (Bruce Publishing Co.)
- Gregory O. Jones (6 December 2001). The American Sailboat. Voyageur Press. pp. 73–. ISBN 978-0-7603-1002-1.
