= C Scow =

Sailboat class

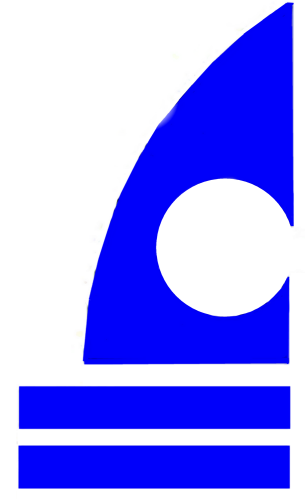

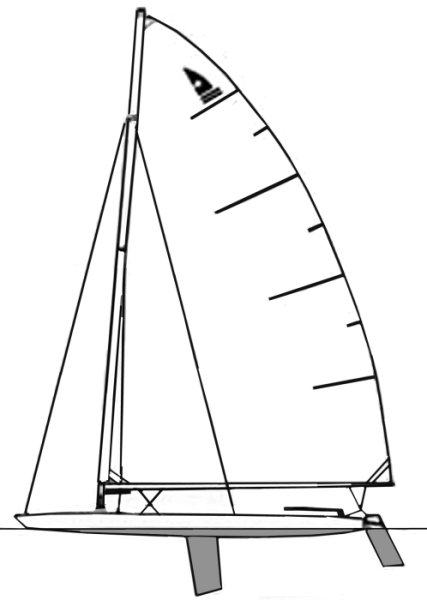

Development
- Designer: John O. Johnson
- Location: United States
- Year: 1905 (disputed)
- No. built: 2,000
- Builders: Johnson Boatworks; Melges Performance Sailboats
- Role: One-design racer
- Name: C Scow

Boat
- Displacement: 650 lb (295 kg)
- Draft: 3.30 ft (1.01 m) with centerboard down

Hull
- Type: scow
- Construction: wood or fiberglass
- LOA: 20.00 ft (6.10 m)
- Beam: 7.00 ft (2.13 m)

Hull appendages
- Keel: twin centerboards
- Rudder: transom-mounted rudder

Rig
- Rig type: cat rig

Sails
- Sailplan: catboat
- Mainsail area: 216.00 sq ft (20.067 m^{2})
- Total sail area: 216.00 sq ft (20.067 m^{2})

Racing
- D-PN: 79.7

The C Scow is an American sailing dinghy that was designed by John O. Johnson as a one-design racer and first built as early as 1905. Sources disagree as to the first-built date, with claims of 1905, 1906 and 1923.

== Production ==
The design was initially built by Johnson Boat Works of White Bear Lake, Minnesota, United States and, starting in 1945 by Melges Performance Sailboats of Zenda, Wisconsin. It remains in production, with 2,000 boats reported as completed by 1994.

== Design ==
The C Scow is a recreational sailboat, with the early examples built predominantly of wood and later ones from fiberglass. It has a catboat rig with wooden or aluminum spars. The hull has a scow hull with a plumb transom, a transom-hung rudder controlled by a tiller, twin retractable centerboards and polystyrene foam flotation for safety. It displaces 650 lb (295 kg).

The boat has a draft of 3.30 ft (1.01 m) with one centerboard extended and 2.5 in (6.4 cm) with both retracted, allowing beaching or ground transportation on a trailer.

For sailing, the design is equipped with running backstays, a raked mast and a boom that is very low to the deck, necessitating a recessed radial track for the boom vang. The boat's forestays can be adjusted while sailing, controlled by a lever mounted aft of the boom vang's recessed radial track. There are quick-releases for the backstays and turnbuckle adjustments for the shrouds. Class rules prohibit pulling the mast to the windward side, however. The design has a ballbearing-equipped mainsheet traveler. The boat has a double-ended outhaul with a 6:1 mechanical advantage, plus a Cunningham, to control mainsail shape.

The design has a Portsmouth Yardstick racing average handicap of 79.7 and is normally raced with a crew of two or three sailors, with a class-imposed maximum crew racing weight of 475 lb (215 kg).

== Operational history ==
The design is regulated and racing organized by a class club, the National C Scow Sailing Association.

In a 1994 review, Richard Sherwood wrote, "As may be seen from the rating, this cat-rigged scow is fast. Scows were developed in the Midwest, but the C-Scow can also be found in Texas and California. There is extensive control ... These boats are one-design, with strict control of hull shape."

== See also ==
- List of sailing boat types
