= Lake Country Limited =

Defunct Amtrak route

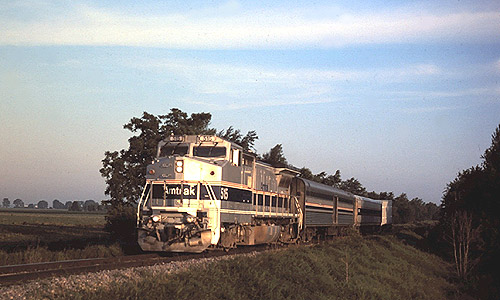
- The Lake Country Limited near Janesville in 2000

Overview
- Service type: Inter-city rail
- Status: Discontinued
- Locale: Illinois, Wisconsin
- Predecessor: Varsity
- First service: April 15, 2000
- Last service: September 23, 2001
- Former operator(s): Amtrak
- Ridership: 2,934 (FY00); 1,614 (FY01)

Route
- Termini: Chicago, Illinois; Janesville, Wisconsin
- Stops: 2
- Distance travelled: 98 miles (158 km)
- Average journey time: 2 hours, 30 minutes
- Service frequency: Daily (before March 2001); Weekly (after March 2001)
- Train number(s): 342, 343, 344

On-board services
- Catering facilities: None
- Baggage facilities: Carry-on only

Technical
- Rolling stock: Horizon or Amfleet coaches
- Track gauge: 4 ft 8 1/2 in (1,435 mm) standard gauge
- Operating speed: 39 mph (63 km/h) (avg.)
- Track owner(s): Metra; Wisconsin and Southern Railroad

The Lake Country Limited was a short-lived Amtrak route which connected Chicago, Illinois with Janesville, Wisconsin. The route was part of Amtrak's Network Growth Strategy, which envisioned an expanded role for mail and express business. The Lake Country Limited would have exchanged goods with a new Chicago–Philadelphia train named the Skyline Connection, which in the end never began operation. The previous time when there was interstate train service along the route was the era immediately before Amtrak (April 30, 1971) when the Chicago, Milwaukee, St. Paul and Pacific Railroad (Milwaukee Road) operated the Sioux and the Varsity trains.

== History ==
The Lake Country Limited was one of multiple Amtrak routes created in an attempt to fulfill a now-waived mandate from Congress to drop all federal funding by October 1, 2002 or be liquidated. Freight revenue from the route was supposed to cover its operating costs, but in fiscal year 2000, passenger fares and freight revenue only covered 6%, being the worst performing Amtrak route in that year.

A stop was added in Zenda, Wisconsin in June 2000. Between December 2000 and February 2001, service was suspended so more rolling stock could be available for other routes. Service shrank from daily to weekly in March 2001, then was discontinued in September 2001. Before its discontinuation, the train carried an average of five to six passengers per run, increasing to 10 to 11 during summer.

== Route ==
Trains originated at Chicago's Union Station and ran north over the tracks of Metra's Milwaukee District North Line. Northwest of Fox Lake, Illinois, it ran over tracks owned by the Wisconsin and Southern Railroad and the state of Wisconsin to a temporary platform outside of Janesville. The poor condition of the Fox Lake–Janesville stretch limited trains to 30 miles per hour (48 km/h). The total journey time was 2 hours, 30 minutes.

The initial route was Chicago–Glenview–Janesville; on June 15, 2000, an additional stop was added at Zenda, Wisconsin to serve Lake Geneva, Wisconsin, a popular resort community. The train consisted of one diesel engine, one coach car, and one non-powered control unit (NPCU).

== See also ==
- Hiawatha (Amtrak train)
- Van Galder Bus Company
