= Scour =

Scour may refer to:

== Hydrodynamic processes ==
- Hydrodynamic scour, the removal of sediment such as sand and silt from around an object by water flow
  - Bridge scour, erosion of soil around at the base of a bridge pier or abutments via the flow of air, ice, or water
  - Tidal scour, erosion of substrate via tidal flow
- Ice scour or ice gouge, a drifting ice feature that scrapes the seabed

== Other ==
- Scour (band), an American black metal band
- Scour Inc., a multimedia search engine
- Scouring (textiles), Scouring, cleaning wool of lanolin, vegetable matter, and other contaminants, prior to use
- Scours, a term for diarrhea, especially among cattle
