= Varsity (train) =

Former Milwaukee Road named passenger train

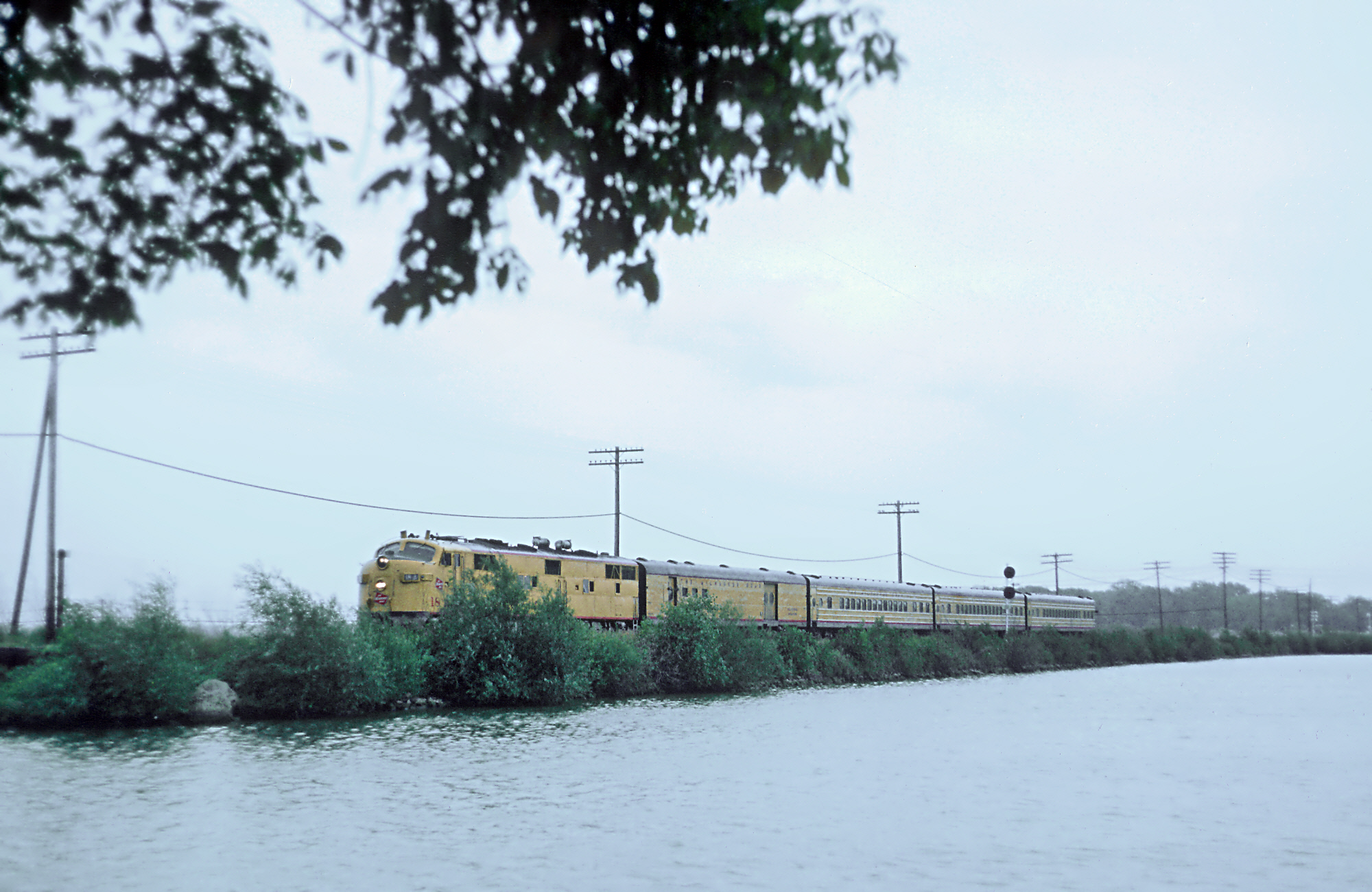
- The Varsity, crossing Lake Monona on August 6, 1967.

Overview
- Status: defunct
- Locale: Illinois and Wisconsin
- Predecessor: Marquette
- First service: 1951
- Last service: April 30, 1971
- Former operator(s): Milwaukee Road

Route
- Termini: Chicago; Madison, Wisconsin
- Distance travelled: 140 mi (230 km)
- Train number(s): 117 (northbound); 118 (southbound)

On-board services
- Seating arrangements: Reclining seat coaches
- Catering facilities: Dining buffet service (1956)
- Observation facilities: Cafe parlor car

Technical
- Track gauge: 4 ft 8 1/2 in (1,435 mm)

The Varsity was a passenger train operated by the Chicago, Milwaukee, St. Paul & Pacific Railroad (Milwaukee Road) over a 140-mile route between Chicago and Madison, Wisconsin.

== History and service ==
The Milwaukee Road began operating trains that connected Chicago and Madison in 1927, a service which took the name Marquette a decade later, and initially ran between Chicago Union Station and Mason City, Iowa. An eight-hour, 384-mile run, it ran until 1951, when service was terminated between Madison and Mason City, and the train was renamed the Varsity. In the beginning, during the days of steam, motive power would usually be the Milwaukee Road's 4-6-2 "Pacific" type locomotives. In the late 1940s, however, diesel power took over, and by the 1950s, EMD F-unit locomotives were assigned to the train. The consist also usually included a railway post office car, one to two passenger coaches, and a café parlor car. During holidays, and during home Wisconsin Badgers football games at Camp Randall Stadium, the Varsity carried additional cars.

By the late 1950s, the Varsity began to face declining ridership due to growing subsidies for air and car travel. In 1963, the Milwaukee Road ended parlor car service, although, for a brief time, café-lounge service was retained, via displaced Skytop Lounges from the defunct Olympian Hiawatha. By 1965, the train had switched to all coaches. Following the termination of the Milwaukee Road’s contract with the United States Postal Service in 1967, the Milwaukee Road petitioned the Interstate Commerce Commission to end service, with the ICC ruling that the Varsity must retain service on weekends and holidays. Service was officially terminated on April 30, 1971, with the creation of Amtrak.

=== 2014 Version ===
In the fall of 2014, it was announced that Pullman Rail Journeys, owned by Iowa Pacific Holdings, would operate a limited number of trains in October 2014 between Chicago and Madison. This included two round-trip runs between the two cities on October 4 and 11, and a run leaving Madison on October 3, and returning on October 5.

=== 2016 Version ===
On June 12, 2016, the Fort Wayne Railroad Historical Society's Nickel Plate 765, a 2-8-4 "Berkshire" type steam locomotive, pulled an excursion train, given the name the Varsity in honor of the original Milwaukee Road train, over part of the route. It ran round-trip between the North Glenview Metra station and Janesville, with a stop in Fox Lake.

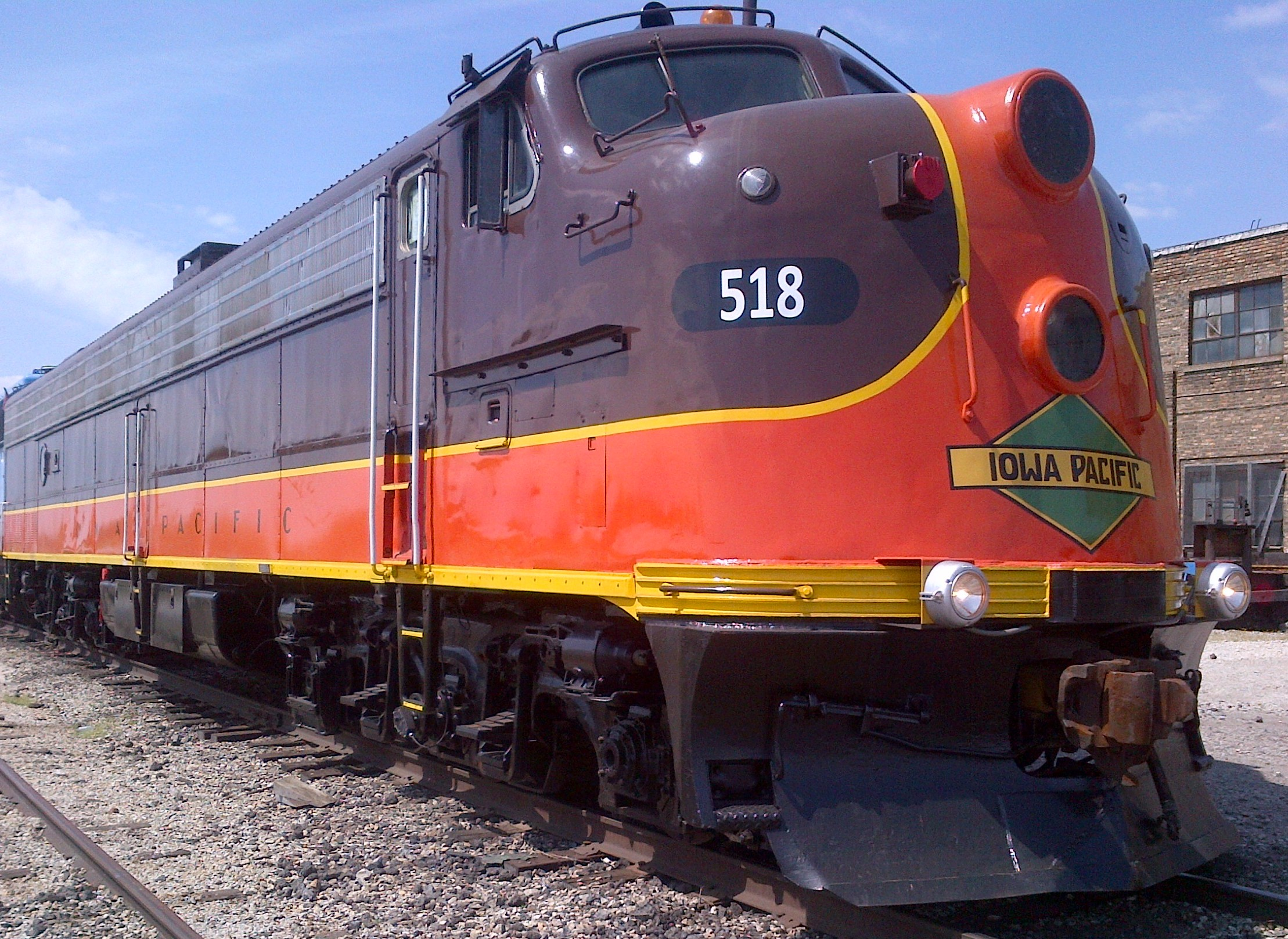
Power for the 2014 Varsity included this E8 locomotive

== Route ==
Leaving Chicago Union Station, the Varsity traveled on what is now the Milwaukee District North Line, making stops in Glenview and Fox Lake, Illinois. After crossing into Wisconsin, the train then continued on, making stops in Walworth, Avalon, Janesville, Edgerton, Stoughton, and McFarland, before crossing Lake Monona, and the Chicago and Northwestern Railway line in the middle of the lake, and arriving in at the Milwaukee Road Depot in downtown Madison.
