= Nelo =

NELO
- Industry: Boat manufacturing
- Founded: 1978
- Founder: Manuel Ramos
- Headquarters: Vila do Conde, Portugal
- Key people: Nuno Mendes, Pedro Fraga
- Products: Canoes, Kayaks, Rowing shells, Boat Equipment
- Number of employees: 150
- Divisions
- Website: Nelo.eu

Nelo (MAR Kayaks Ltda) is a Portuguese company that designs and manufactures kayaks and canoes.

Nelo was founded in 1978 by Manuel Alberto Ramos (known as Nelo by his friends and family), a former paddler himself and the first Portuguese Canoeing National Champion.

The original focus on canoeing expanded into other water sports as well, most notably the manufacturing of rowing shells.
