= MC Scow =

Sailboat class

Development
- Designer: Melges & Johnson
- Location: United States
- Year: 1956
- No. built: 2,760
- Builders: Melges Performance Sailboats; Johnson Boat Works
- Role: One-design racer

Boat
- Crew: 1-3
- Displacement: 420 lb (191 kg)
- Draft: 3 ft (0.91 m) with a bilgeboard down

Hull
- Type: Monohull
- Construction: Fiberglass
- LOA: 16.00 ft (4.88 m)
- Beam: 5.67 ft (1.73 m)

Hull appendages
- Keel: twin bilgeboards
- Rudder: transom-mounted rudder

Rig
- Rig type: cat rig

Sails
- Sailplan: Catboat
- Mainsail area: 135.00 sq ft (12.542 m^{2})
- Total sail area: 135.00 sq ft (12.542 m^{2})

The MC Scow is an American sailing dinghy that was designed as a one-design racer and first built in 1956.

The boat is a development of the John O. Johnson-designed J Scow of the mid-1950s, significantly re-designed by Melges.

== Production ==
The design has been built by Melges Performance Sailboats and Johnson Boat Works in the United States since 1956, with a total of 2,760 boats completed. Johnson went out of business in 1998, but the boat remains in production by Melges.

== Design ==
The MC Scow is a recreational sailboat, with the reverse sheer scow hull built predominantly of fiberglass, with mahogany wood trim. It has a catboat rig with anodized aluminum spars, a transom-hung rudder controlled by a tiller and dual retractable bilgeboards. It displaces 420 lb (191 kg).

The boat has a draft of 3 ft (0.91 m) with a bilgeboard extended and can be transported on a trailer.

For sailing the design is equipped with hiking straps and has a mainsail window to improve visibility. It also has a 2:1 mechanical advantage, four-part mainsheet traveler, a Cunningham, a 12:1 boom vang and a 3:1 outhaul.

It is normally raced by a crew of one to three sailors.

== Operational history ==
By 1994 the boat was being raced in 21 fleets in Texas, Georgia, Oklahoma, Missouri, Nebraska, North Carolina, Michigan, Wisconsin and Iowa. By 2020 it was being raced in over 100 fleets across the United States.

In a 1994 review Richard Sherwood wrote, "single-hander? Catboat? Scow? Well, it has bilgeboards. The MC can be sailed single-handed, but it is a big boat and will easily carry more ... The MC is perhaps not quite as athletic as most single-handers."

== See also ==
- List of sailing boat types
