= The Glen/North Glenview station =

Commuter rail station in Glenview, Illinois

The Glen/North Glenview

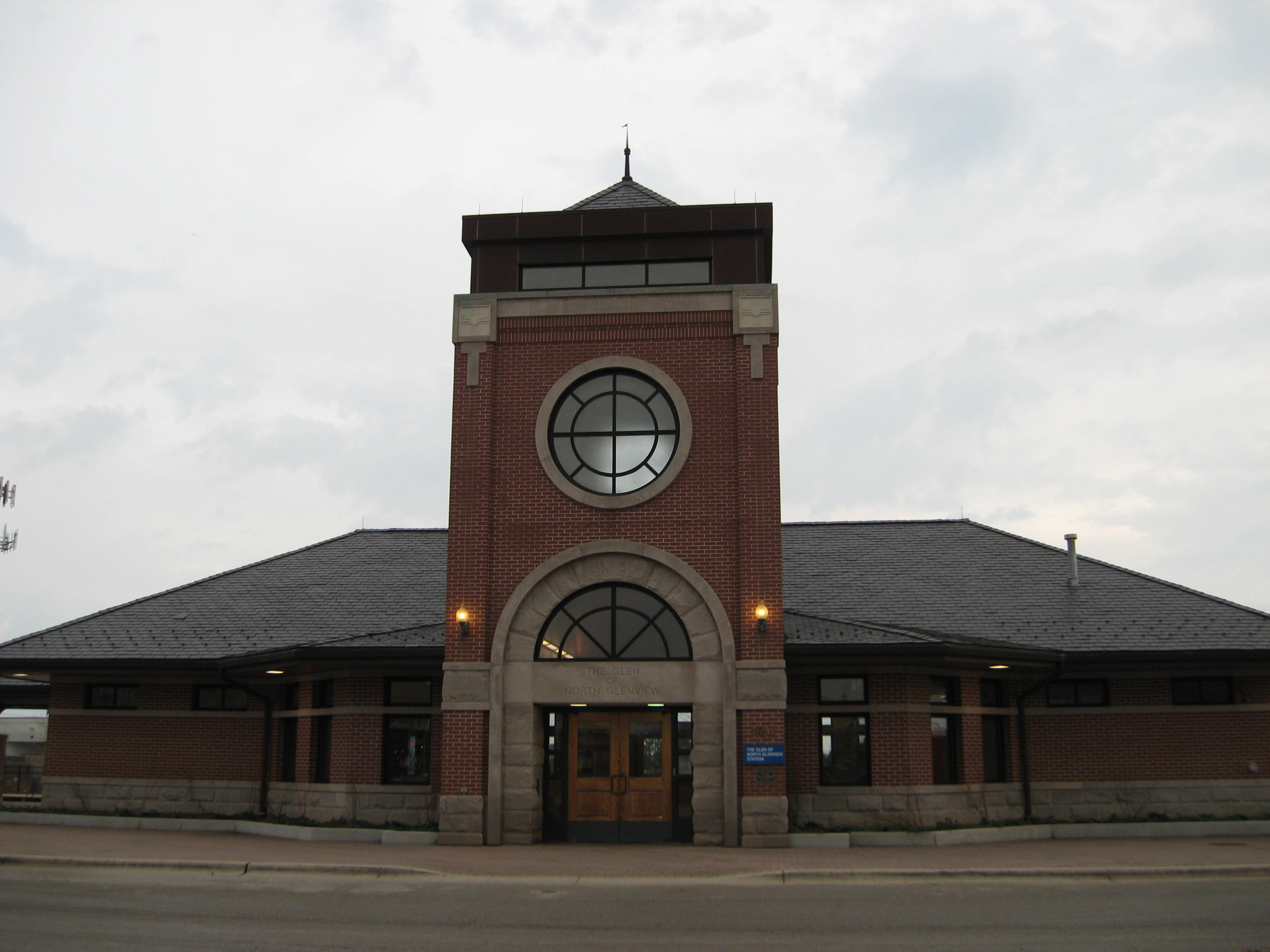

General information
- Location: 3000 Old Willow Road; Glenview, Illinois 60025
- Coordinates: 42.0975°N 87.8159°W
- Owner: Metra
- Line: C&M Subdivision
- Platforms: 2 side platforms
- Tracks: 2
- Connections: Pace Buses

Construction
- Parking: Yes
- Accessible: Yes

Other information
- Fare zone: 3

History
- Opened: 2001

Passengers
- 2018: 1,163 (average weekday) ▲8.7%
- Rank: 34 out of 236

Services
Preceding station	Metra	Following station
Northbrook toward Fox Lake	Milwaukee District North	Glenview toward Union Station
Track layout
Location

North Glenview (signed as The Glen of North Glenview) is one of two commuter railroad stations on Metra's Milwaukee District North Line in Glenview, Illinois. The station is located at 3000 Old Willow Road, is 18.5 miles (29.8 km) away from Chicago Union Station, the southern terminus of the line, and serves commuters between Union Station and Fox Lake, Illinois. In Metra's zone-based fare system, North Glenview is in zone 3. As of 2018, North Glenview is the 34th busiest of Metra's 236 non-downtown stations, with an average of 1,163 weekday boardings.

As of February 15, 2024, North Glenview is served by 44 trains (19 inbound, 25 outbound) on weekdays, by all 20 trains (10 in each direction) on Saturdays, and by all 18 trains (nine in each direction) on Sundays and holidays.

It is proposed that the Amtrak trains, the Hiawatha, Borealis, and Empire Builder, which currently serve Glenview, one stop south, would shift here. This move would eliminate lengthy stops which block traffic on Glenview Road. This move would involve reconstruction of the North Glenview station to handle the additional traffic, and depends on commitments from Glenview, the Illinois General Assembly and Metra.

== Bus connections ==
Pace

- 423 Linden CTA/The Glen/Harlem CTA (weekdays only)
