= Melges 20 =

Sailboat class

Development
- Designer: Reichel/Pugh
- Location: United States
- Year: 2007
- Builder: Melges Performance Sailboats
- Role: Racer

Boat
- Crew: 2-4
- Displacement: 1,146 lb (520 kg)
- Draft: 4.50 ft (1.37 m) with keel down

Hull
- Type: monohull
- Construction: fiberglass
- LOA: 20.00 ft (6.10 m)
- Beam: 7.00 ft (2.13 m)
- Engine: outboard motor

Hull appendages
- Keel: lifting keel
- Rudder: transom-mounted rudder

Rig
- Rig type: Bermuda rig

Sails
- Sailplan: fractional rigged sloop
- Mainsail area: 172 sq ft (16.0 m^{2})
- Jib/genoa area: 88 sq ft (8.2 m^{2})
- Spinnaker area: 430 sq ft (40 m^{2})
- Upwind sail area: 260 sq ft (24 m^{2})
- Downwind sail area: 690 sq ft (64 m^{2})

The Melges 20, originally called the Audi Melges 20, is an American trailerable sailboat that was designed by Reichel/Pugh as a one-design racer and first built in 2007.

The design was a World Sailing international class from 2012 to 2025.

== Production ==
The design has built by McConaghy Boats in China for Melges Performance Sailboats of the United States, since 2007 and remains in production.

== Design ==
The Melges 20 is a racing keelboat, built predominantly of fiberglass. It has a fractional sloop rig with a roller furling jib. The hull has a plumb stem, a slightly reverse transom, a transom-hung rudder controlled by a tiller and a retractable lifting keel, with a lead bulb weight. It displaces 1,146 lb (520 kg).

The boat has a draft of 4.50 ft (1.37 m) with the keel extended. With it retracted the boat can be operated in shallow water or transported on a boat trailer.

The boat is factory-equipped with a small outboard motor for docking and maneuvering. It is sailed by a crew of two to four sailors with no class weight restrictions.

For sailing downwind the design may be equipped with a masthead asymmetrical spinnaker of 430 sq ft (40 m^{2}), flown from a retractable bowsprit mounted on the starboard side of the bow.

== Operational history ==
The boat is supported by an active class club that organizes racing events, the International Melges 20 Class Association.

In a 2008 review by two writers for Sailing World magazine, Dave Reed wrote, "the boat has superb balance, and obviously, the faster we went the better it felt. Carving up and down to catch waves was easy and the boat quickly jumped on surfs ... and frankly, had we had one less body, we could have done another tick or two better." Stuart Streuli reported, "the Melges 20 is a hoot to sail. It tracks like a train upwind, rewarding a steady hand on the tiller, and is very nimble off the wind. We hit speeds of 13 to 14 knots downwind in 15 to 20 knots of wind and very rough seas. It’s tippy, and much more like a dinghy than the 24. When the lulls hit, the boat would quickly roll to windward, both upwind and down."

== See also ==
- List of sailing boat types
