= Melges 32 =

Sailboat class

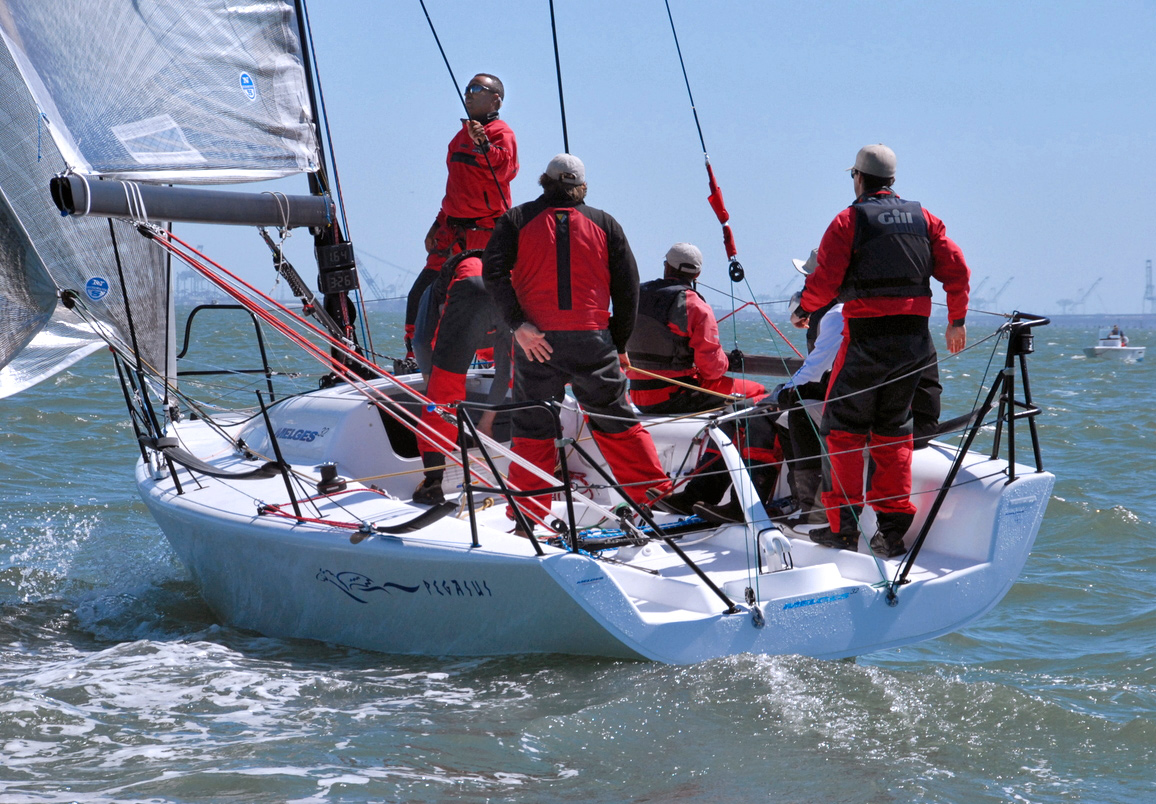

Development
- Designer: Reichel/Pugh
- Location: United States
- Year: 2004
- No. built: 230
- Builders: Melges Performance Sailboats; SOCA Sailboats
- Role: Racer
- Name: Melges 32

Boat
- Crew: five
- Displacement: 3,774 lb (1,712 kg)
- Draft: 7.00 ft (2.13 m)

Hull
- Type: monohull
- Construction: composite material
- LOA: 31.83 ft (9.70 m)
- LWL: 28.50 ft (8.69 m)
- Beam: 9.83 ft (3.00 m)

Hull appendages
- Keel: lifting keel
- Ballast: 1,570 lb (712 kg)
- Rudder: spade-type rudder

Rig
- Rig type: Bermuda rig
- I foretriangle height: 39.90 ft (12.16 m)
- J foretriangle base: 10.80 ft (3.29 m)
- P mainsail luff: 44.00 ft (13.41 m)
- E mainsail foot: 15.40 ft (4.69 m)

Sails
- Sailplan: fractional rigged sloop
- Mainsail area: 445 sq ft (41.3 m^{2})
- Jib/genoa area: 254 sq ft (23.6 m^{2})
- Spinnaker area: 1,302 sq ft (121.0 m^{2})
- Gennaker area: 774 sq ft (71.9 m^{2})
- Upwind sail area: 719 sq ft (66.8 m^{2})
- Downwind sail area: 2,021 sq ft (187.8 m^{2})

The Melges 32 is an American sailboat that was designed by Reichel/Pugh as a one-design racer and first built in 2004.

The design is an accepted World Sailing international class.

== Production ==
The design has been built by Melges Performance Sailboats in the United States, since 2004, with 230 boats completed and remains in production. It was also at one time built by SOCA Sailboats of Laventille, Trinidad and Tobago.

== Design ==
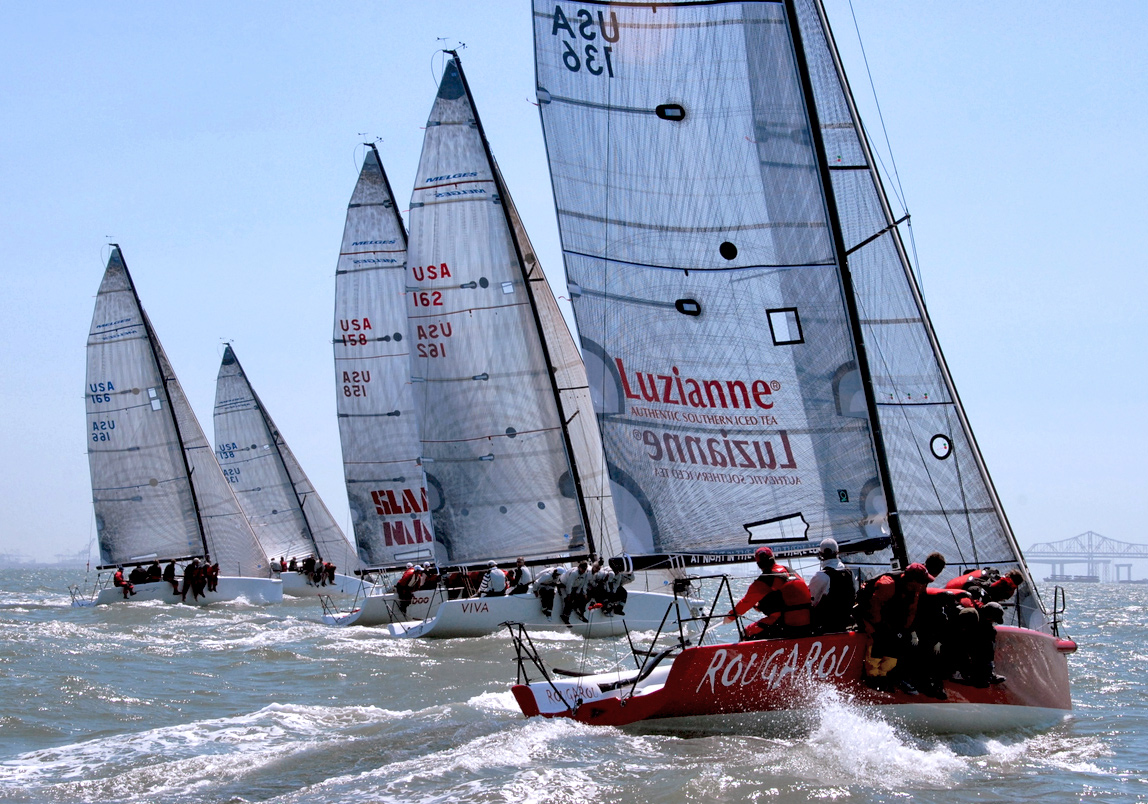
2009 US Melges 32 North American Sailing Championship on San Francisco Bay

The Melges 32 is a racing keelboat, built predominantly of composite material. It has a 7/8 fractional sloop rig with dual swept spreaders, a keel-stepped mast and carbon fiber spars. The hull is built from fiberglass reinforced epoxy and a PVC fiberglass epoxy sandwich. The hull has a nearly-plumb stem, an open reverse transom, an internally mounted spade-type rudder controlled by a tiller and a retractable carbon fiber lifting keel with a lead bulb weight. It displaces 3,774 lb (1,712 kg) and carries 1,570 lb (712 kg) of lead ballast.

The boat has a draft of 7.00 ft (2.13 m) with the keel extended. With it retracted the boat can be operated in shallow water or transported on a boat trailer.

The boat is normally fitted with a small 10 hp (7 kW) outboard motor for docking and maneuvering.

For sailing downwind the design may be equipped with an asymmetrical spinnaker of 1,302 sq ft (121.0 m^{2}), a reaching gennaker of 774 sq ft (71.9 m^{2}) or a light air reaching asymmetrical spinnaker (VMG) of 1,113 sq ft (103.4 m^{2}).

The design has a hull speed of 7.15 kn (13.24 km/h).

== Operational history ==
The boat is supported by an active class club that organizes racing events, the International Melges 32 Class Association.

== See also ==
- List of sailing boat types
