= Melges 24 =

Sailboat class

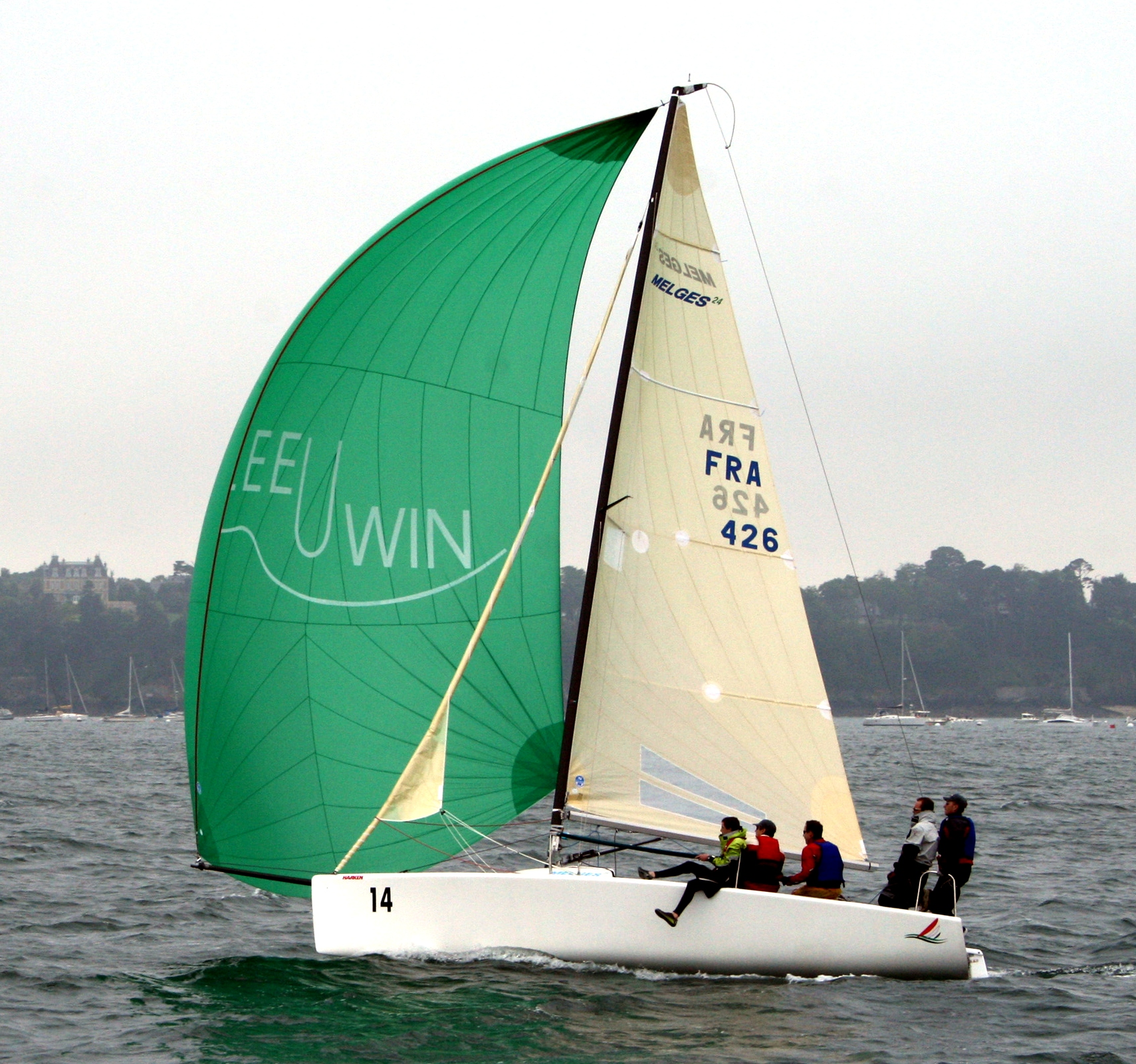

Development
- Designer: Reichel/Pugh
- Location: United States
- Year: 1993
- No. built: over 900
- Builders: Melges Performance Sailboats; Devoti Sailing
- Role: Racer
- Name: Melges 24

Boat
- Crew: four
- Displacement: 1,750 lb (794 kg)
- Draft: 5.00 ft (1.52 m) with keel down

Hull
- Type: monohull
- Construction: fiberglass
- LOA: 24.00 ft (7.32 m)
- LWL: 22.00 ft (6.71 m)
- Beam: 8.20 ft (2.50 m)
- Engine: outboard motor

Hull appendages
- Keel: lifting keel with weighted bulb
- Ballast: 650 lb (295 kg)
- Rudder: transom-mounted rudder

Rig
- Rig type: Bermuda rig
- I foretriangle height: 27.85 ft (8.49 m)
- J foretriangle base: 7.95 ft (2.42 m)
- P mainsail luff: 28.90 ft (8.81 m)
- E mainsail foot: 12.45 ft (3.79 m)

Sails
- Sailplan: fractional rigged sloop
- Mainsail area: 179.90 sq ft (16.713 m^{2})
- Jib/genoa area: 110.70 sq ft (10.284 m^{2})
- Spinnaker area: 670 sq ft (62 m^{2})
- Upwind sail area: 290.61 sq ft (26.999 m^{2})
- Downwind sail area: 850 sq ft (79 m^{2})

Racing
- PHRF: 75-105

The Melges 24 is a one-design racing keelboat. It was first built in 1993 by Melges Performance Sailboats, and remains in production. It has been a World Sailing international class in 1997. More than 900 boats had been completed by 2021.

It is raced in over 20 countries and the class world championships typically attract over 100 boats. The Melges 24 World Championship is an annual international regatta, organized by the host club on behalf of the International Melges 24 Class Association.

== Design ==
Designed by Reichel/Pugh, the fiberglass hull has a nearly-plumb stem, an open reverse transom, a transom-hung rudder controlled by a carbon fiber tiller with an extension and a retractable lifting keel with a weighted bulb. It displaces 1,750 lb (794 kg) and carries 650 lb (295 kg) of lead ballast. The boat has a draft of 5.00 ft (1.52 m) with the keel extended. With the keel retracted it can operate in shallow water or be transported on a trailer. The design has a hull speed of 6.29 kn (11.65 km/h) and a PHRF handicap of 75 to 105.

The boat may be fitted with a small 3 hp (2 kW) outboard motor for docking and maneuvering. The motor is stored under the cockpit when not in use.

It has a fractional sloop rig with a deck-stepped carbon fiber mast. For sailing downwind the design may be equipped with a masthead asymmetrical spinnaker of 670 sq ft (62 m^{2}), flown from a retractable bowsprit.

Typically the boat employs a crew of four sailors, but two to five crew may be carried.

In a 1996 review Darrell Nicholson wrote in Practical Sailor, "if sailboats were defined in human terms, the Melges 24 could easily be described as having the attributes of a precocious three-year-old who hadn't learned to respect her elders. More than likely, she also would be described as being gifted, if a little high strung ... Aside from its plumb bow, narrow beam, flat bottom, hard bilges and open transom, one of the most striking features of the boat's design is the enormous, 13-foot long cockpit, designed to allow crew to move quickly from side to side during tacks, and to position weight in pre-determined spots to maximize boat speed off the breeze."
