= Sioux (train) =

Former passenger train from Chicago, Illinois, to Rapid City, South Dakota

Overview
- Service type: Inter-city rail
- Status: discontinued
- Locale: Midwestern United States
- First service: 1928
- Last service: April 30, 1971
- Former operator(s): Milwaukee Road

Route
- Termini: Chicago, Illinois; Rapid City, South Dakota
- Distance travelled: 140 mi (230 km)
- Train number(s): 11 (westbound); 22 (eastbound)

On-board services
- Seating arrangements: Reclining seat lounge coaches
- Sleeping arrangements: Sections and drawing room; (eastbound only: compartment also available) (1948)
- Catering facilities: Parlor-dining service

Technical
- Track gauge: 4 ft 8 1/2 in (1,435 mm)

The Sioux was a named passenger train of the Milwaukee Road that operated between Chicago, Madison, Wisconsin, and Rapid City, South Dakota, via Prairie du Chien, Wisconsin and northern Iowa. The train, #11, westbound, and #22, eastbound, operated coaches, dining cars and sleeping cars through most of its history.

On the route the train included a dining car serving breakfast, and a first-class parlor car. However, by the post-war 1940s, the parlor car was combined with dining car functions. West of Madison it also operated as a mail train, making frequent stops. The train crossed the Mississippi River on the Pile–Pontoon Railroad Bridge.

On October 1, 1951, the train was cut back to a Chicago to Canton, South Dakota, service with prepaid taxi connections to nearby Sioux Falls. In the 1950s, the Sioux itinerary between Chicago's Union Station and Madison, Wisconsin was limited stops between Chicago and Walworth; and service in that latter territory was handled by suburban Milwaukee Road trains.

In 1960 the train was further cut back to a Chicago to Madison coach service. The train ceased operation on May 1, 1971, when Amtrak assumed responsibility for providing a national rail service.
