= Johnson Boat Works =

Johnson Boat Works was a builder and developer of racing sailboats of the scow design in White Bear Lake, Minnesota. It was founded in 1896, by John O. Johnson who had emigrated from Norway in 1893. After working with Gus Amundson for three years, Johnson started his own boat-building business in 1896. His first major success was the "Minnezitka" a 38-foot scow design which won the championship on White Bear Lake in 1900. This sailboat was the beginning of the A-Class. As more classes were founded, Johnson moved on to B's, C's, D's, and E's.

Johnson was commissioned to build the 16-foot X-Boat for youth in the 1930s. Johnson designed the J-Scow in the mid-1950s which was converted to the MC. Through the years, the boat builder built Optis and 420s. In 1994, the builder brought out the Johnson 18. In 1998, two years after Johnson Boat Works turned 100 years old, the family sold the company. The scow molds were sold to their competitor Melges Boat Works (now called Melges Performance Sailboats) in Wisconsin. The other molds, including the Johnson 18 mold, were sold to Catalina Yachts in California. The repair and storage part of the company was sold to a family member who renamed the company White Bear Boat Works.
