= Zenda, Wisconsin =

- Unincorporated community
- Location within Wisconsin Location within the United States
- Coordinates: 42°30′43″N 88°28′54″W
- Country: United States
- State: Wisconsin
- County: Walworth
- Elevation: 978 ft (298 m)
- Time zone: UTC-6 (Central (CST))
  - Summer (DST): UTC-5 (CDT)
- ZIP Code: 53195
- Area code: 262
- GNIS feature ID: 1577124

Zenda is an unincorporated community in the Town of Linn, Walworth County, Wisconsin, United States. It is located south of Geneva Lake and just north of the Illinois border. Its ZIP code is 53195.

== History ==
In 1955, a meteorite (the Zenda meteorite) was found in Zenda by farmer Allyn Palmer. His oldest son later sold the meteorite to his high school science club for a few dollars.

Amtrak's Lake Country Limited stopped at a station in Zenda from 2000–2001. The Milwaukee Road's Milwaukee District North Line (now a part of Metra) also used to stop in Zenda from 1901-1982.

== Economy ==
The headquarters of Melges Performance Sailboats is located in Zenda.

== Notable people ==
- Buddy Melges, Olympic gold medalist in sailing and co-skipper of 1992 America's Cup winner America³, lived in Zenda.
