= G-Cat 5.0 =

Sailboat class

Development
- Designer: Hans Geissler
- Location: United States
- Year: 1975
- Builder: G-Cat Multihulls
- Role: One-design racer
- Name: G-Cat 5.0

Boat
- Crew: two
- Displacement: 340 lb (154 kg)
- Draft: 1.08 ft (0.33 m)

Hull
- Type: Catamaran
- Construction: Fiberglass
- LOA: 16.67 ft (5.08 m)
- LWL: 15.50 ft (4.72 m)
- Beam: 8.00 ft (2.44 m)

Hull appendages
- Keel: none
- Rudder: transom-mounted rudder

Rig
- Rig type: Bermuda rig

Sails
- Sailplan: Fractional rigged sloop
- Mainsail area: 150 sq ft (14 m^{2})
- Jib/genoa area: 60 sq ft (5.6 m^{2})
- Total sail area: 210 sq ft (20 m^{2})

Racing
- D-PN: 76.0

The G-Cat 5.0 is an American catamaran sailing dinghy that was designed by Hans Geissler as a one-design racer and first built in 1975.

The G-Cat 5.0 design was developed into the slightly longer G-Cat 5.7 in 1980.

== Production ==
The design was built by G-Cat Multihulls in Saint Petersburg, Florida, United States, but it is now out of production. The company produced over 2,000 examples of the 5.0 and the 5.7 combined.

== Design ==
The G-Cat 5.0 is a recreational sailboat, built predominantly of fiberglass. It has a fractional sloop rig with a fully battened mainsail, a rotating mast and all-aluminum spars. The symmetrical hulls have raked stems, vertical transoms and transom-hung, kick-up rudders controlled by a tiller. The boat has a trampoline for the crew, with an optional second one forward of the mast that can be used as the base for a tent for overnight accommodation. The design has no centerboards or daggerboards, relying instead on deep V-shaped hulls with a rockered shape to prevent leeway. The boat displaces 340 lb (154 kg).

The boat has a draft of 1.08 ft (0.33 m), allowing beaching or ground transportation on a trailer.

For sailing the design is equipped with a outhaul, downhaul and a mainsheet traveler that is mounted on the aft crossbeam.

The design has a Portsmouth Yardstick racing average handicap of 76.0 and is normally raced with a crew of two sailors.

== Operational history ==
In a 1994 review Richard Sherwood wrote that the "G-Cat is an unusual catamaran with symmetrical hulls and without daggerboards. Also unusual is the trampoline forward of the mast, upon which an optional tent may be pitched for cruising, (To avoid pitch-poling, remove the forward trampoline in heavy weather.) The hulls are a deep vee section to resist leeway. The boat has substantial rocker that puts lateral resistance well below the center of effort, making the boat pivot easily about the middle."

== See also ==
- List of sailing boat types
- List of multihulls

Related development

- G-Cat 5.7
