= Prindle =

Prindle may refer to:

== Geography ==
- Mount Prindle, granite massif in eastern Alaska
- Prindle Volcano, extinct cinder-cone in eastern Alaska
- Prindle, Washington, community in Skamania County

== People ==
- Cyrus Prindle (1800–1885), American abolitionist
- Eric Prindle (born 1976), American professional mixed martial artist
- Mike Prindle (born 1963), American football player
- Edwin J. Prindle (1868–1942), American patent office worker

== Other ==
- PRNDL (Park, Reverse, Neutral, Drive, and Low; pronounced and sometimes spelled prindle), a vehicle's gear shifter housing
- Prindle 18 and Prindle 18-2, American catamaran designs by Geoffrey Prindle
