= Angle of list =

Degree of heel or leaning of a waterborne vessel

The angle of list is the degree to which a vessel heels (leans or tilts) to either port or starboard at equilibrium—with no external forces acting upon it. If a listing ship goes beyond the point where a righting moment will keep it afloat, it will capsize and potentially sink.

Listing is caused by the off-centerline distribution of weight aboard due to uneven loading or to flooding. By contrast, roll is the dynamic movement from side to side caused by waves.

== Gallery ==
Angle of list

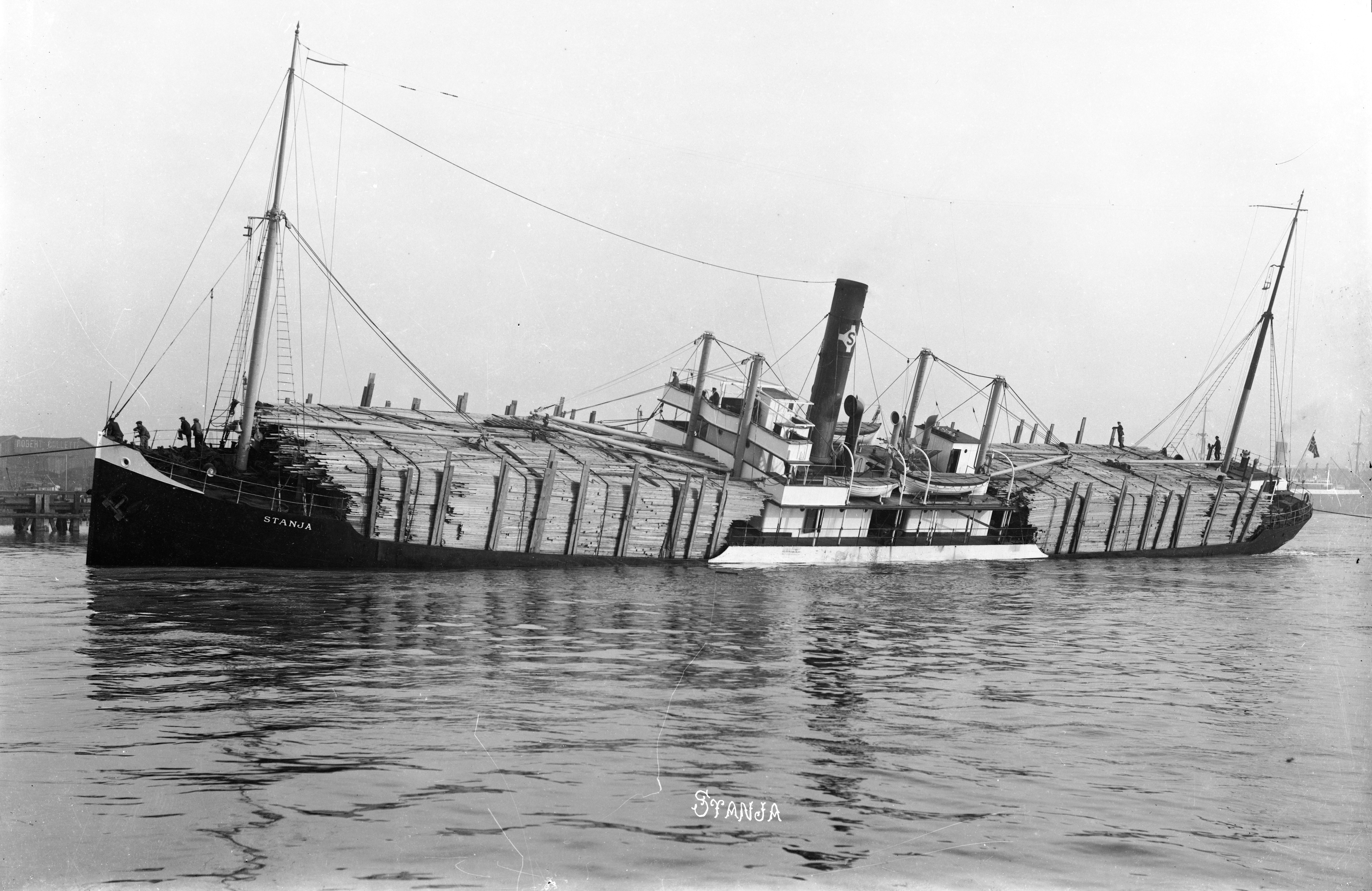
Norwegian steamer Stanja arriving in Antwerp

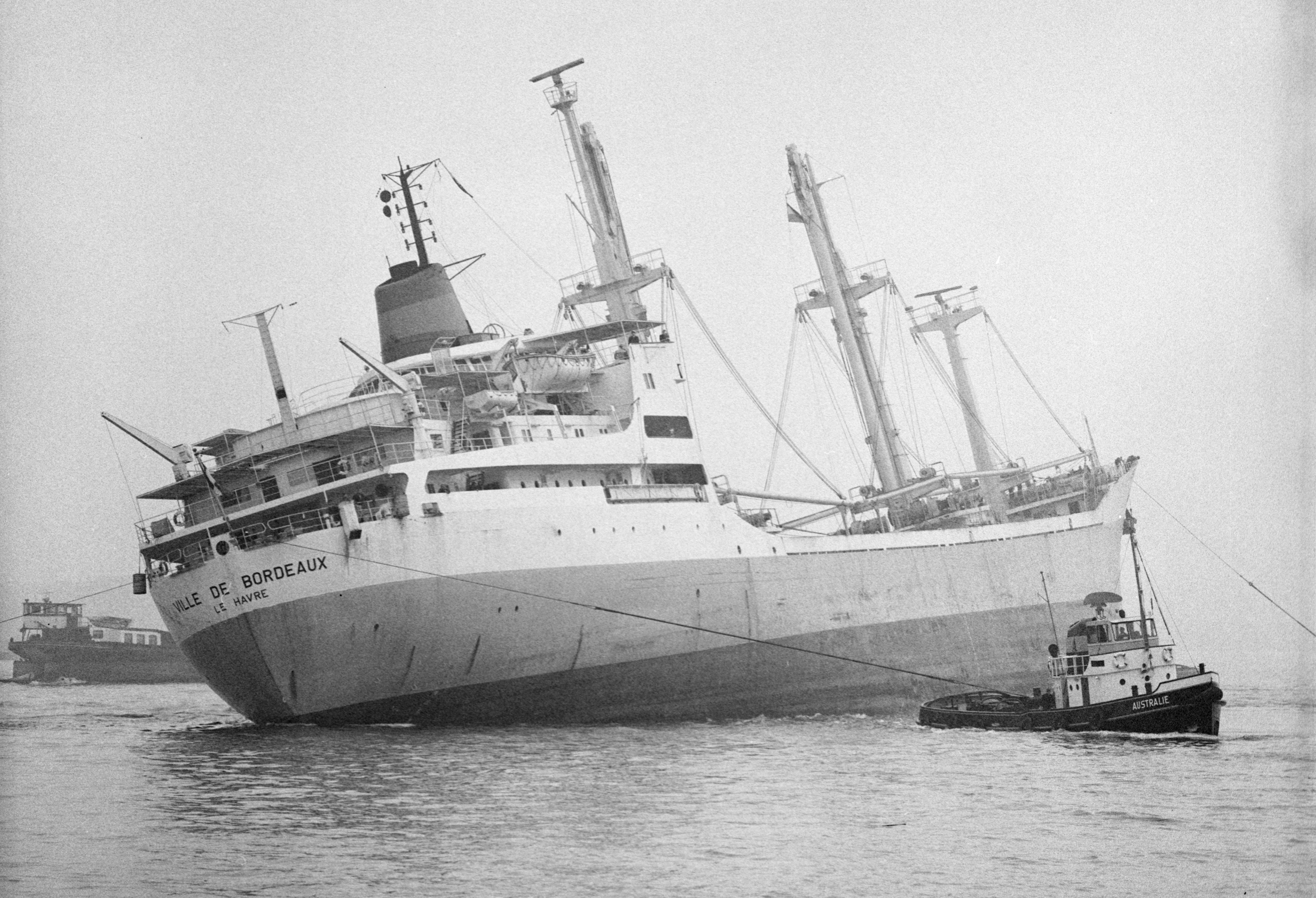
French cargo ship Ville de Bordeaux listing after collision

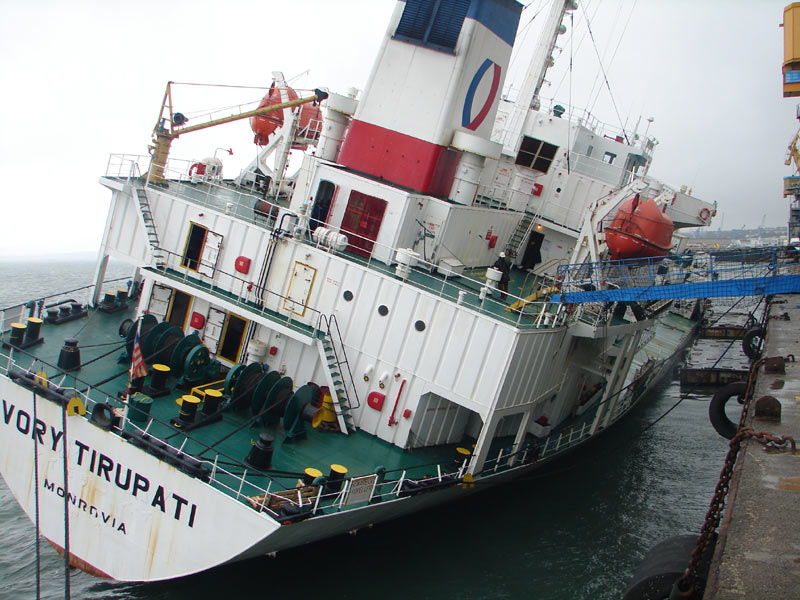
Reefer Ivory Tirupati listing in the port of Brest

== See also ==
- Angle of loll
- Heeling (sailing)
- Capsizing
- Metacentric height
- Ship stability
- Ship motions
- Draft (hull)
