= Turtling (sailing) =

Turning a boat upside down

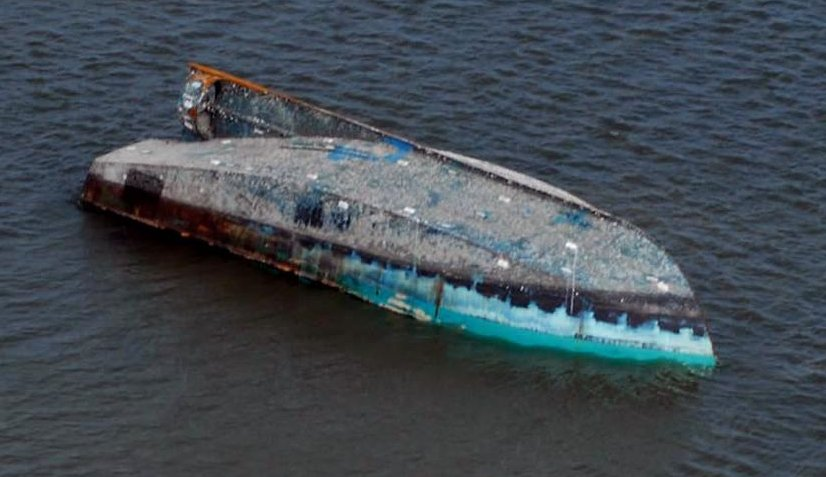
Boat that has turned turtle (upside down)

A boat is said to be turtling or to turn turtle when it is fully inverted. The name stems from the appearance of the upside-down boat, similar to the carapace (top shell) of a sea turtle. (Note: However, "to turn turtle" means putting a turtle on its back by grabbing it by the flipper, and conversely is used to refer to a vessel that has turned upside down, or which has cast off its crew. Smyth, W. H.; Belcher, E. (1867). The sailor's word-book: An alphabetical digest of nautical terms, including some more especially military and scientific ... as well as archaisms of early voyagers, etc. London: Blackie and Son. pp. 702–703.) (Note: A related nautical turtle metaphor is the term Turtleback Deck or "deck, turtle nautical: A term applied to a weather deck that is rounded over from the shell of the ship so that it has a shape similar to the back of a turtle. Used on ships of the whaleback type and on the forward weather deck of torpedo boats." "World War II Naval Dictionary". USS Abbot (DD-629). Archived from the original on 12 December 2013.) The term can be applied to any vessel; turning turtle is less frequent but more dangerous on ships than on smaller boats. (Note: In larger vessels a capsize almost inevitably leads to a sinking. "To turn upside down, and usually, to sink. There is no vessel so large that the largest ocean wave, taken broadside, cannot capsize." "Naval Slang Dictionary" (PDF). p. 6. Archived from the original (PDF) on 2 November 2013.) It is rarer but more hazardous for multihulls than for monohulls, because multihulls are harder to flip in both directions. Measures can be taken to prevent a capsize (where the boat is knocked over on its beam-ends but not yet inverted) from becoming a turtle (with bottom up).

== Definition and prevention ==
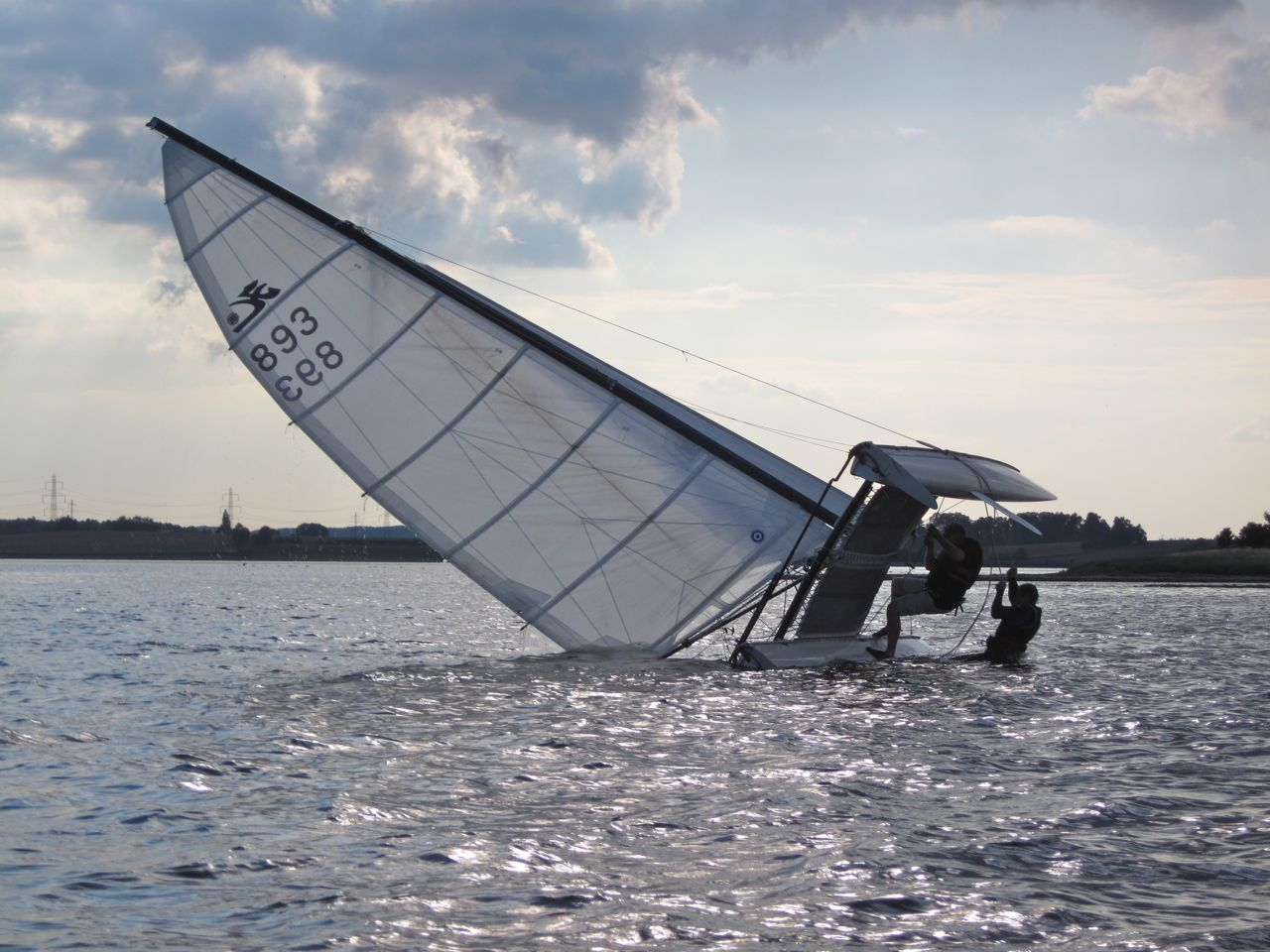
Righting a capsized Hobie Cat.

When a boat is "turned over completely" it has turned turtle. Some sources treat the term "turtle" as synonymous with "capsize" or "keel over". but most others make a distinction. (Note: Compare, "Turn Turtle. To turn over completely, with keel uppermost." "Capsize. To overturn or upset. Said to be derived from words meaning 'to move a barrel by turning it on head and bilge alternatively'." Layton, C.W.T., F.R.A.S., M.R.I.N. Assoc. R.I.N.A.; Clissold, Peter, Commander R.N.R. (Retd.), Master Mariner, Younger Brother of Trinity House, Fellow of the Royal Institute of Navigation revised; Miller, Captain A. G. W. Extra master revised this edition (1994). "Dictionary of Nautical Words and Terms: 8000 Definitions in Navigation, Seamanship, Rigging, Meteorology, Astronomy, Naval Architecture, Average, Ship Economics, Hydrography, Cargo Stowage, Marine Engineering, Ice Terminology, Buoyage, Yachting, etc" (PDF) (Revised Fourth ed.). Glasgow: Brown, Son & Ferguson, Ltd., Nautical publishers. pp. 370, 71. Archived from the original (PDF) on 27 February 2014.) Carrying too much sail or loss of control can lead to broaching—the boat heels too far to one side, or capsizes. While all turtlings involve a capsize, the converse is untrue. Prevention is the first priority. (Note: "A seaman laboring under an undue sense of security becomes at once worth hardly half his salt." – Joseph Conrad. Conrad, Joseph (1921). The Mirror of the Sea. Doubleday, Page. p. 18. cited in Rousmaniere at p. 19.)

With the exception of self-righting watercraft, vessels have an angle of vanishing stability (AVS). External forces aside, if they are tilted at an angle less than the AVS, they will pop back upright. If they are tilted at an angle greater than the AVS, they will turn turtle and stay there. In other words, non-self-righting vessels are stable when turtled. Their primary stability and secondary stability are greater than zero, tending to right them, but their tertiary or inverted stability is less than zero, and tends to keep them upside-down.

Capsizing (but not necessarily turtling) is an inherent part of dinghy sailing, and is considered to be "routine". It is not a question of "if" but a question of "when".

For those who prefer to avoid the experience, a keelboat monohull has physics on its side. (See limit of positive stability.) But even yachts can capsize and turtle in extraordinary conditions, so design considerations and suitability for particular tasks, locations, weather, duration and situations are essential queries. "Such events can overcome skill and experience"; boats need to be appropriate for foreseeable conditions. It is a fundamental question of seaworthiness.

Turtling commonly occurs when a boat capsizes and is not righted or attended to in time, allowing it to roll through the approximately 90 degrees of a capsize through to 180 degrees from upright.

Prevention and delay of turtling in dinghies is the highest priority—turtling can be catastrophic in consequences—but it depends on skill, ability and athleticism, which vary greatly. As John Rousmaniere wrote: Testing confirms the Royal Yachting Association's conclusion that "a decisive way to address entrapment is to immediately right the boat by putting weight on the centerboard", daggerboard, (or bilgeboard in a scow). His 2012 report advises that "US Sailing and other organizations should consider establishing this as doctrine." Thus, reliance on boat handling and seamanship may be misplaced.

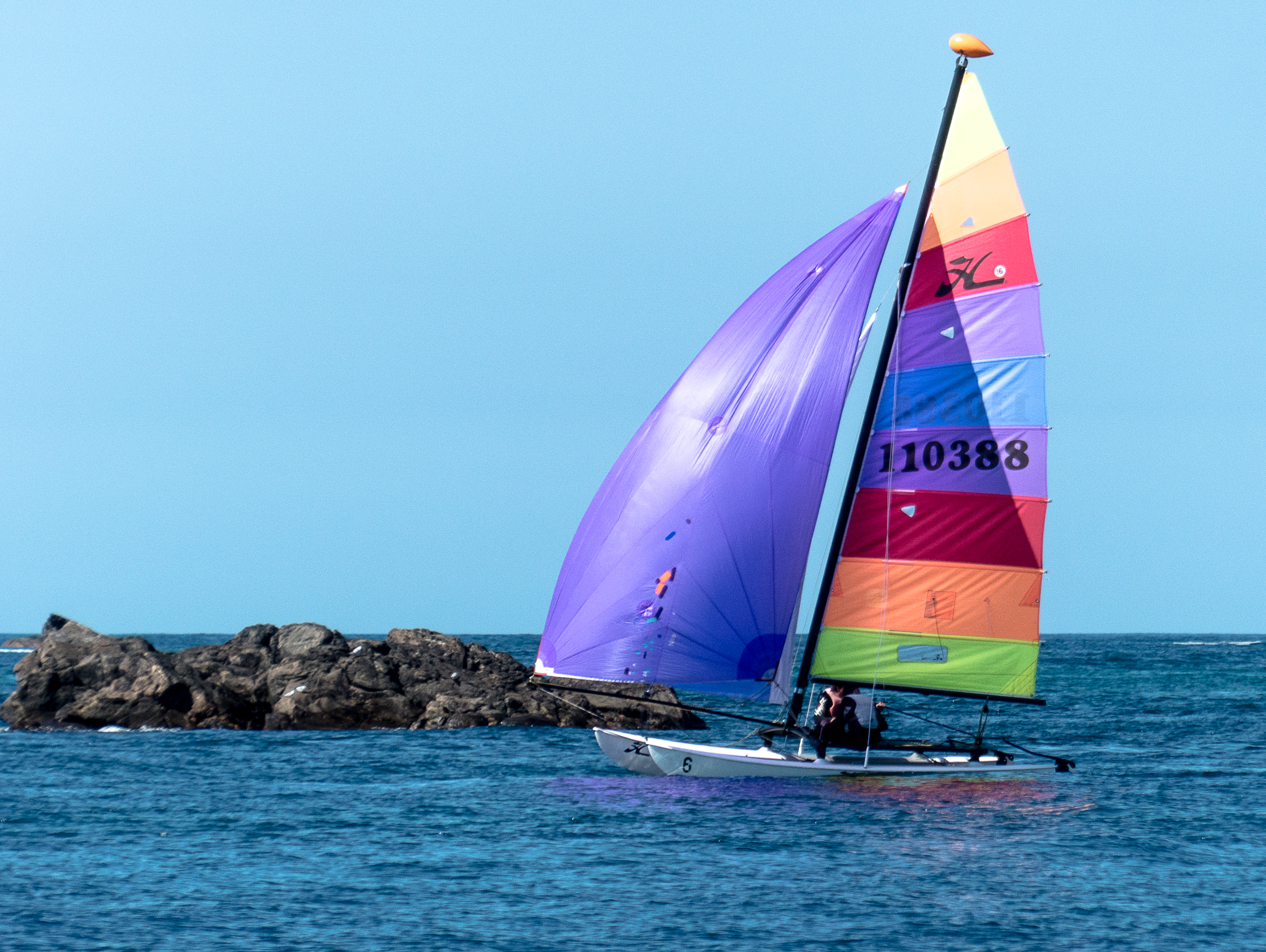
A Hobie catamaran with a masthead float to prevent turtling

Sealing masts and attaching flotation are effective preventatives for turtling of dinghies, but not widely utilized. More certain preventatives for this includes various forms of flotation added to the tip of the mast or top of the mainsail. (Note: Intended for "rough weather or novice racers". "Hartley Wayfarer Mark IV". Distances, obstacles and the likelihood of rescue are other factors that should be considered in deciding whether to prepare for the worst. As Franz Kafka, Larry McMurtry in Lonesome Dove, and Huey Lewis and the News have written: "It is better to have it and not need it, than need it and not have it.") These include floats (e.g., one that looks like a streamlined blimp used on Hobie 16s) (Note: "Easily removed for trailering or racing." "Hobie Mast Float – Mama Bob". Sailboat Marine.) or a "sail patch"—a sleeve with built in flotation that fits over the top of the sail, available for example as option on the Wayfarer (dinghy) Mark IV. Another alternative is to seal the mast, thereby increasing its buoyancy.

As an emergency palliative, putting flotation (i.e., a spare life vest or other personal flotation device), onto the end of the mast straight away after a capsize and without delay, can forestall a turtle. Conversely, climbing onto the side of a knocked down boat can increase the likelihood of turtling, as it moves weight higher over the center of gravity, may also increase windage, and thus can effectively drive the mast downward.

Several devices have been patented to prevent turtling. Capsizing is particularly troublesome for catamarans and trimarans, which are especially hard to right.

The use of a trapeze, harness, jackline or other tether can cause injury or death due to entrapment if a boat turtles.

== Practice and cure ==
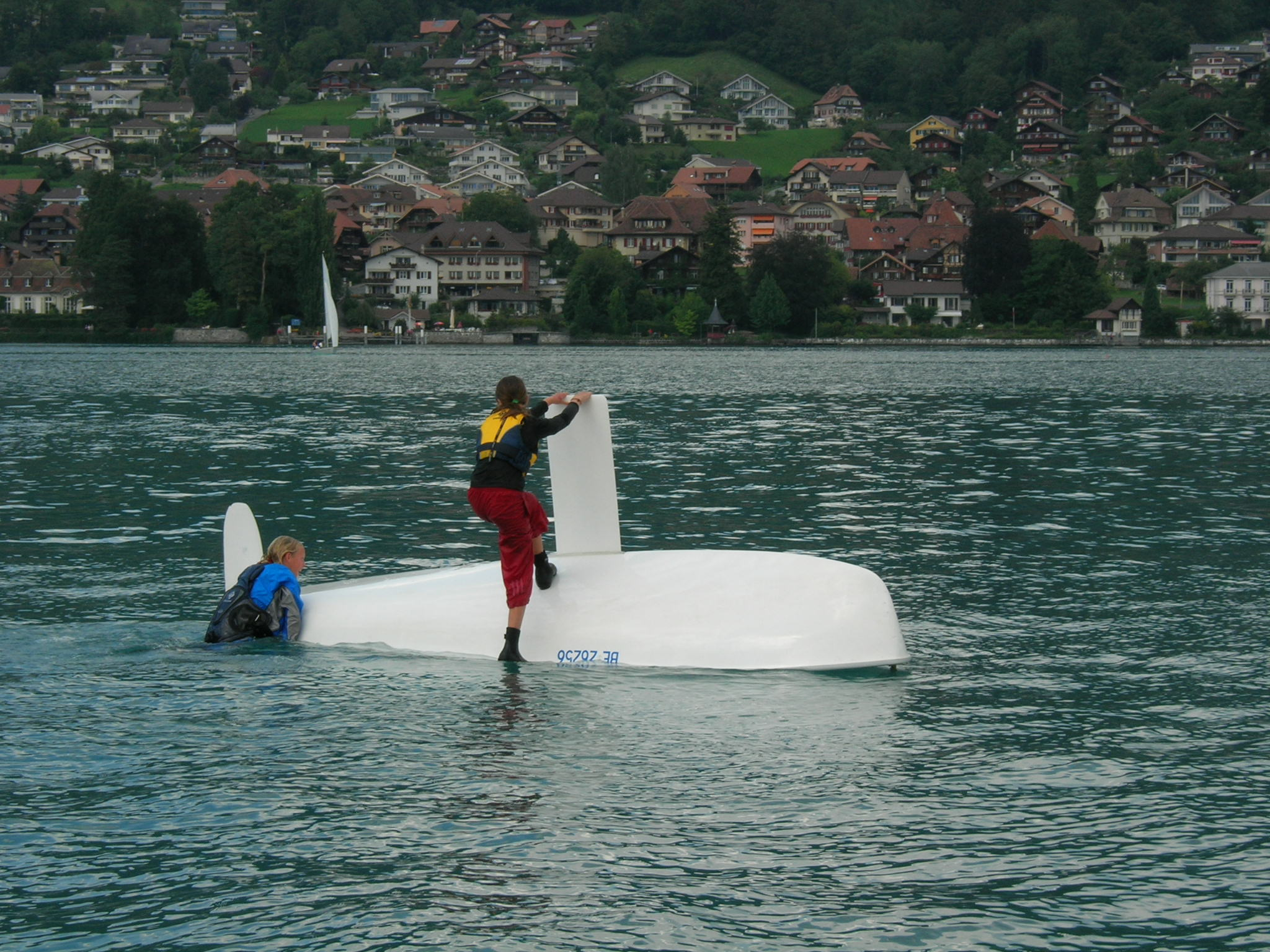
Righting a turtled sailing dinghy

Righting a turtled dinghy is one of the most difficult maneuvers. Recovery in a monohull requires releasing the main sheet and jib sheet, lowering the spinnaker if it is deployed, standing on the bottom of the boat and levering on the centerboard, or standing on the centerboard (there may be weight and placement restrictions). It is important that other members of the crew not be on top the boat, as this can drastically increase resistance to righting the craft. The use of "righting ropes" materially aids the process. Standing on the centerboard and "piggybacking" of crew members can be highly effective to right a turtled dinghy, as it increases both the weight and leverage being applied. Use of powerboats to aid is problematical, and depending on the technique used—there are several—may or may not succeed. See Capsize. Rigging righting lines depends upon proper placement, and critically should be done in advance of the need to use them.

== Multihulls ==
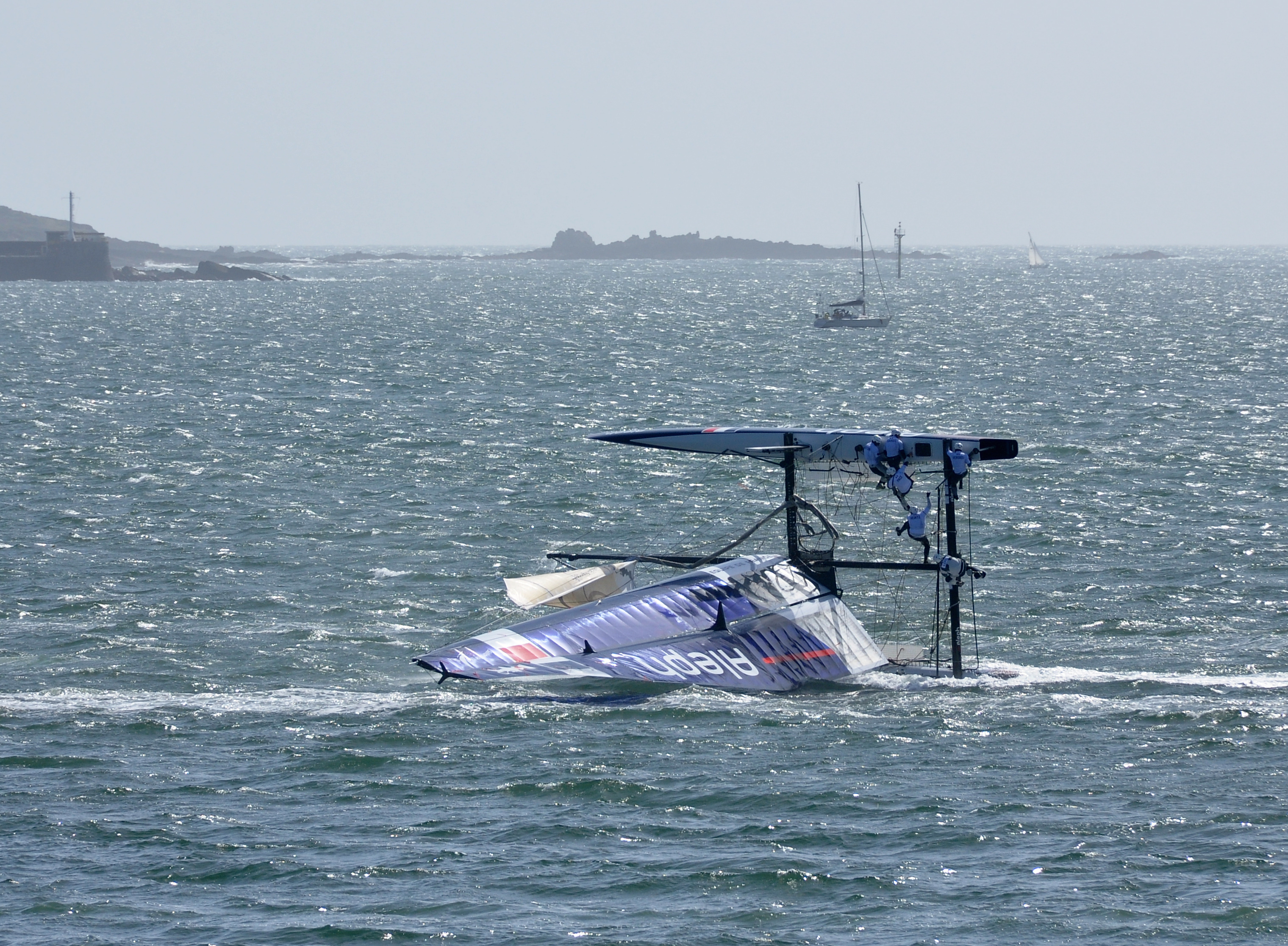
Multihull Aleph capsizing during America's Cup trials, Plymouth

In yacht sailing, multihulls are deemed to be more prone to turtling than keeled monohulls, and there is essentially no way to right them if they overturn. The juxtaposition of the hulls and sail when turtled—it makes them inherently stable when inverted—makes them especially resistant to righting. Consequently, some larger multihulls are built with a turtle emergency escape hatch beneath the hull. Indeed, some locales require such safety hatches. There are, however, those who feel that the likelihood of a capsize of a large multihull is overrated. There are others who state that a self-righting multihull is the answer, along with designing in safety and proper operation. A patent has been issued specifically concerning righting of turtled large multihulls. It is intended to avoid the necessity to use divers and special equipment in a recovery.

It is, however, possible (and often successfully) to right a capsized small multihull, e.g., a Beachcat and Hobie 16. The process begins with positioning ropes so that the crew can get leverage (acting together is key). Righting Beach catamarans that are turtled can be extremely difficult. Loss of sails, rigging, masts and boats can occur, not to mention sailors. A singled-handed self-rescue can be assisted by filling a garbage bag (called in this context a "righting bag") with water, and throwing it over the rescuer's shoulder. See Hobie 16 which suggests sitting on the rear of one sponson, which will upturn a turtled Hobie.

Some large multihulls can be righted at sea—provided that the skipper is prepared and has appropriate devices, tools, skills, a workable plan, cooperative waves, weather and wind.

== Notable events ==
The Fastnet race, and particularly the 1979 Fastnet race (the disastrous race that changed yacht racing for all time), has been the occasion for many sailboat capsizes, turtlings and fatalities. In the 1979 race, "15 sailors died, five boats sank, and at least 75 boats flipped upside down." In any event, adopting heaving to as a storm tactic proved to be a good preventive of capsize during the race. Not one of the hove to yachts were capsized or suffered any serious damage. See also Capsize of Drum (1985) and Capsize of Rambler (2011), both of which involved large Maxi yachts that lost their keels. (Note: Compare 1993 and 1998 Sydney to Hobart Yacht Race. Rousmaniere, John (17 April 2000). Fastnet, Force 10: The Deadliest Storm in the History of Modern Sailing (Paperback). New York: W. W. Norton & Company. p. 304. ISBN 0393308650. ISBN 978-0393308655)

In December 2008, the high speed experimental sailing hydrofoil trimaran Hydroptère set a world speed record, then pitchpoled while going over 60 knots. The turtled yacht had to be towed back to port for being turned right side up.

In the 2011 Chicago Yacht Club Race to Mackinac, the high performance monohull sportsyacht WingNuts, a Kiwi 35, turtled in an extreme storm, killing the captain and one crew member. Later inquiry determined the boat—specifically its high performance extremely wide low displacement hull—was unfit for the location, weather, and the lengthy multiday race format, and urged race officials to change ratings and revoke privileges for similar boats to enter the race. (Note: On the other hand, one meteorologist suggested: Veteran Chicago-Mac racers have encountered similar conditions during previous races and understand that coping with severe weather is part of the challenge. Skippers must prepare their boats, train their crew, maintain a watchful eye for approaching storms and "the dearest friend (and most menacing foe) of all sailors—the wind. Thornton, Mark A. (August 2011). "2011 Chicago-Mackinac Race: A Meteorological Summary".) The waves were not all that unusual, although the wind was. The boat may have buried one of its hiking wings into a wave, causing it to 'trip', and had the other lifted by the wind. It is rare but not unheard of for keelboats to turtle and remain upside down, particularly if its keel is intact. However, this boat's unique hull form, which made it very fast, also rendered it more stable upside down than right side up. This was a recipe for the disaster. This loss was occasioned despite a competent and experienced crew which was as well equipped and prepared as thought to be necessary. WingNuts met then current offshore stability standards, which failed to adequately take into account the dynamic effect of the "radical" winged hull. (Note: "On paper, WingNuts met all stability requirements for the Chicago-Mac race. The race required that all boats have an Offshore Racing Rule (ORR) handicap measurement certificate, a document that includes two measures of stability: Limit of Positive Stability (LPS) and the Stability Index (SI). However, after the accident, the US Sailing panel found that the ORR formulas did not adequately penalize the Kiwi 35's extreme flare, the difference between the waterline beam and the maximum beam. When the panel eliminated a fixed lower limit for the "capsize increment"—one of the factors used in the calculating stability index—WingNuts' index of 100.7 plummeted to 74.4. No other boat in the race had the same drastic reduction in its stability index when the same math was applied. In addition, the panel noted that the Right Arm Curve (GZ Curve)—a graphic representation of the boat's stability—revealed WingNuts to be just as stable inverted as it was right side up, sharply reducing any chance of recovery from a full capsize." "PS Analysis: The 2011 WingNuts Capsize Practical Sailor". Practical Sailor. April 2012.)

On 13 June 2012, in the trials leading to the America's Cup, Oracle Team USA on an AC45 spectacularly capsized the boat, and it was righted with minimal damage ("there's a little rip there") ten minutes later. Skipper Russell Coutts dismissed it as "a learning experience". This was an epilogue to earlier similar incidents by other teams in Australia.

On 9 May 2013, the 2013 America's Cup challenger Artemis broke apart, broached, capsized, and turtled destroying its wing/sail and trapping two crew members under its hull. The AC72 wing-sail catamaran was sailed on behalf of the Royal Swedish Yacht Club, sponsoring Team Artemis. Andrew "Bart" Simpson, an Olympic-gold medal-winning British sailor, died as a result.

== Legal implications ==
Capsize and turtling can result in legal liability for damages due to negligence.

== See also ==
- Angle of loll
- Broach (nautical)
- Capsizing
- Death roll
- Drogue
- Kayak roll
- keeling over
- Limit of positive stability
- Metacentric height
- Naval architecture
- Ship stability
- Weight distribution
