= Prindle 18 =

Sailboat class

Development
- Designer: Geoffrey Prindle
- Location: United States
- Year: 1977
- No. built: 2,300
- Builders: Surfglas; Prindle Catamarans; Lear Siegler Inc.
- Role: Racer
- Name: Prindle 18

Boat
- Crew: two
- Displacement: 335 lb (152 kg)
- Draft: 7 in (18 cm)

Hull
- Type: Catamaran
- Construction: Fiberglass
- LOA: 18.00 ft (5.49 m)
- LWL: 17.00 ft (5.18 m)
- Beam: 7.92 ft (2.41 m)

Hull appendages
- Keel: none
- Rudder: transom-mounted rudders

Rig
- Rig type: Bermuda rig
- Mast height: 28.677 ft (8.741 m)

Sails
- Sailplan: Fractional rigged sloop
- Mainsail area: 170 sq ft (16 m^{2})
- Jib/genoa area: 48 sq ft (4.5 m^{2})
- Total sail area: 218 sq ft (20.3 m^{2})

Racing
- D-PN: 74.5

The Prindle 18 is an American catamaran sailing dinghy that was designed by Geoffrey Prindle as a racer and first built in 1977.

Geoffrey Prindle had started out as a surfboard manufacturer but was also successful racing Hobie 14 catamarans and started his own line of boats, starting with the Prindle 16.

== Production ==
The design was initially built by Surfglas, a surfboard manufacturer that changed its name to Prindle Catamarans. The boat was also built by Lear Siegler Inc. in the United States. A total of 2,300 boats were built, but it is now out of production.

The design was replaced in the manufacturer's line by the Prindle 18-2 in 1983, a more conventional design, with straight hulls and centerboards.

== Design ==
The Prindle 18 is a recreational sailboat, built predominantly of fiberglass. It has a fractional sloop rig with aluminum spars, a rotating mast and a fully-battened mainsail, using foam and fiberglass sail battens. The mast spreaders are adjustable for rake. The dual asymmetrical hulls have raked stems, slightly reverse transoms and dual transom-hung, kick-up beaching rudders controlled by a tiller. The hulls are both rockered and have no keels or daggerboards. The design displaces 335 lb (152 kg) and features a mesh trampoline between the hulls.

This beachcat design has a draft of 7 in (18 cm) allowing beaching. The hinged mast also facilitates ground transportation on a trailer.

For sailing the design may be equipped with one or two trapezes. It has a 4:1 mechanical advantage downhaul, an outhaul and mast rotation controls. The jib luff is attached with a zipper.

The design has a Portsmouth Yardstick racing average handicap of 74.5 and is normally raced with a crew of two sailors.

== See also ==
- List of sailing boat types
- List of multihulls
