= Prindle 18-2 =

Sailboat class

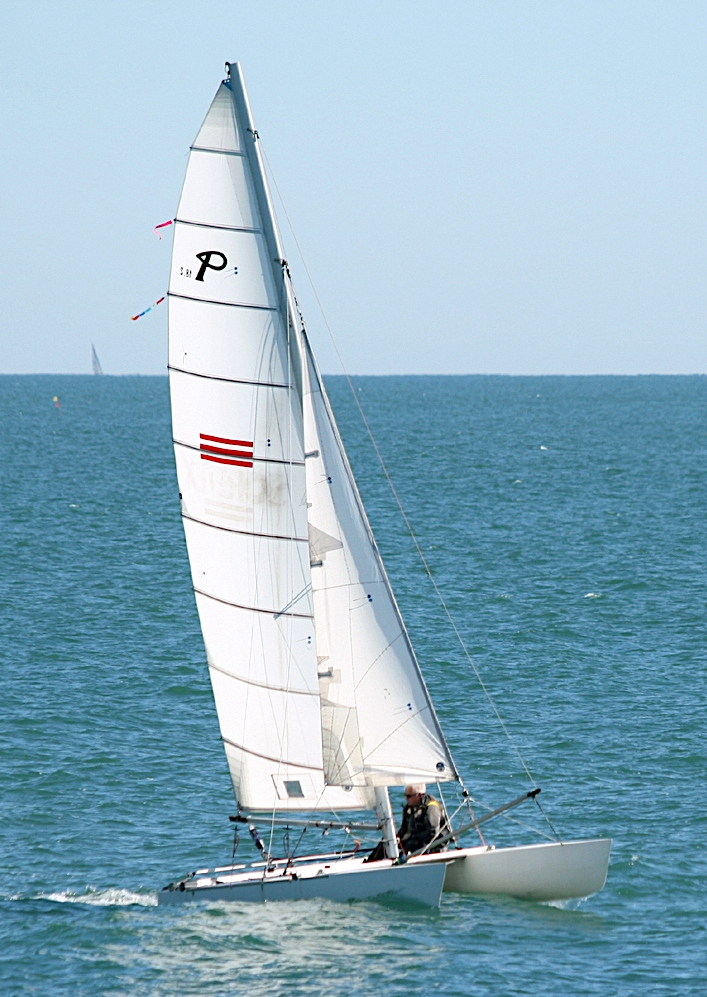

Development
- Location: United States
- Year: 1983
- Builders: Prindle Catamarans; Performance Catamarans
- Name: Prindle 18-2

Boat
- Crew: two
- Displacement: 375 lb (170 kg)
- Draft: 2.08 ft (0.63 m)

Hull
- Type: catamaran
- Construction: fiberglass
- LOA: 18.00 ft (5.49 m)
- LWL: 17.20 ft (5.24 m)
- Beam: 8.50 ft (2.59 m)

Hull appendages
- Keel: twin centerboards
- Rudder: transom-mounted rudders

Rig
- Rig type: Bermuda rig

Sails
- Sailplan: fractional rigged sloop
- Total sail area: 233 sq ft (21.6 m^{2})

The Prindle 18-2, or Prindle 18.2, is an American catamaran sailing dinghy that was designed as a racer and first built in 1983.

== Production ==
The design was initially built by Prindle Catamarans, starting in 1983. After the product line was sold in about 1988, it was produced by Performance Catamarans in the United States, but it is now out of production.

The design replaced the 1977 Prindle 18 in manufacturer's product line.

== Design ==
The Prindle 18-2 is a recreational sailboat, built predominantly of fiberglass. It has a fractional sloop rig with aluminum spars and a fully-battened mainsail. The dual symmetrical hulls have raked stems, plumb transoms, dual transom-hung, kick-up rudders controlled by a tiller and dual, retractable centerboards. The design displaces 375 lb (170 kg) and features a mesh trampoline between the hulls.

The design has a draft of 2.08 ft (0.63 m) with the centerboards down and 6 in (15 cm) with them retracted, allowing beaching or ground transportation on a trailer.

== Operational history ==
In a review in Popular Mechanics in October 1987, writer Chris Caswell said, "under sail, the Prindle was balanced, responsive and easy to tack. Its knife-like bows sliced through Mission Bay waters during close reaches and the wake stretched out behind like twin white jet trails. Then, when flying a hull and powered by a sudden gust, it took off like a rocket. For sheer ecstasy of speed, you can't beat a well-designed catamaran."

== See also ==
- List of sailing boat types
- List of multihulls
