= Metacentric =

Metacentric may refer to:

- Metacentric height, the distance between the center of gravity of a ship and its metacenter
- Metacentric centromere, the position of a centromere on a chromatid
