= Limit of positive stability =

Angle of tilt beyond which a boat will capsize

In sailing, the limit of positive stability (LPS) or angle of vanishing stability (AVS) is the angle from the vertical at which a boat will no longer stay upright but will capsize, becoming inverted, or turtled.

For example, if a boat with an LPS of 120 degrees rolls past this point, i.e. its mast is already at an angle of 30 degrees below the water, it will continue to roll and be completely upside down in the water. Except for dinghy sailboats and multihulls, most larger sailboats (monohull keelboats) have lead or other heavy materials in their keel at the bottom of their hulls to keep them from capsizing or turtling.

The LPS was a part of the Offshore Racing Rules and is used to measure how stable or seaworthy a sailboat is. The modern offshore racing rules published by the International Sailing Federation may also use the measurement.

== See also ==
- Angle of loll
- Capsizing
- Kayak roll
- Metacentric height
- Naval architecture
- Initial stability – concerning boats
- Secondary stability – concerning boats
- Ship stability
- Turtling
- Weight distribution
