= Secondary stability =

Boat's ability to right itself

Secondary stability, also known as reserve stability, is a boat or ship's ability to right itself at large angles of heel (lateral tilt), as opposed to primary or initial stability, the boat's tendency to stay laterally upright when tilted to low (<10°) angles.

The study of initial and secondary stability are part of naval architecture as applied to small watercraft (as distinct from the study of ship stability concerning large ships).

A greater lateral width (beam) and more initial stability decrease the secondary stability- once tilted more than a certain angle the boat is conversely harder to restore to its stable upright position.

== Other types of ship stability ==
- Primary stability
- Tertiary stability (also called inverse stability): Tertiary stability is undesirable as it causes a vessel to remain upside-down. Self-righting watercraft have negative tertiary stability, and no limit of positive stability. For kayak rolling, the stability of an upside-down kayak is also important; lower tertiary stability makes rolling up easier.

== See also ==
- Ship stability
- Kayak § Types of stability
- Limit of positive stability — boats
