= Beachcat =

Small sailing catamaran

The term beachcat is an informal name for one of the most common types of small recreational sailboats, minimalist 14 to 20 foot catamarans, almost always with a cloth "trampoline" stretched between the two hulls, typically made of fiberglass or more recently rotomolded plastic. The name comes from the fact that they are designed to be sailed directly off a sand beach, unlike most other small boats which are launched from a ramp. The average 8 foot width of the beachcat means it can also sit upright on the sand and is quite stable in this position, unlike a monohull of the same size. The Hobie 14 and Hobie 16 are two of the earliest boats of this type that achieved widespread popularity, and popularized the term as well as created the template for this type of boat.

== Background ==
The term "beachcat" was popularized by surf board designer Hobie Alter, who designed the paradigm-changing Hobie 14 in 1965 and Hobie 16 in 1967. The underlying concept of a small beachable multihull sailboat or canoe is thousands of years old. Single-outrigger boats, double-canoes (catamarans), and double-outrigger boats (trimarans) of the Austronesian peoples are the direct antecedents of modern multihull vessels. They were developed during the Austronesian Expansion (c. 3000 to 1500 BC) which allowed Austronesians to colonize maritime Southeast Asia, Micronesia, Island Melanesia, Madagascar, and Polynesia.

== Early modern designs ==
During the 1950s several catamaran designs were built in Europe and America. Construction styles and materials varied. Manufactured beachcats first came into style in the 1960s, with several popular designs. The Aqua cat is a good example of one of the early 1960s catamarans that is still in production. There was also the international sailing association design criteria for racing cats organized into four letter classes, A, B, C and D classes. Those classes gave agreed upon basic dimensions that any would be racers could design to and compete evenly by class. Most designs had two hulls connected by two aluminum beams and use a cloth mesh net as the "deck" aka "tramp" or trampoline-The A-cat became popular and currently is exploring the move into higher performance via foiling. The 20 ft (6.1 m) Tornado was designed in 1966 as a B cat, it is still considered one of the fastest designs. In 1984 the Tornado became an Olympic class for two sailors. The hulls once were laminated of wood, later fiberglass and currently autoclaved carbon/epoxy is used on the fastest boats. The hull shape works so well it inspired several easier to handle production boats, including the Prindle 18-2, and 19, as well as the Hobie Miracle 20.

== Basic proportions ==
Catamarans use their wide form to get stability while keeping wetted area low with just 2 narrow hulls in the water. As the windspeed increases, the sailor(s) usually can 'trapeze' off the side using their weight to minimize the boats heeling and enabling higher boat speed. Beach cats range in length from about 12 ft (3.7 m) up to 23 ft (7.0 m) (Stiletto). The smaller boats are often intended to sail and race with one sailor aboard, those boats usually have no jib sail and are often 14 or 17 ft (4.3 or 5.2 m) long and about 300 lb (140 kg). The width of the boat (the beam) is ideally a bit more than 1/2 the hull length, i.e. the 20-foot (6.1 m) Supercat had a 12-foot (3.7 m) beam and is one of the very highest performing catamarans, however a 12 foot wide boat needs to be completely disassembled for transport by trailer on public roads, that greatly limited sales and popularity of the Supercat 20, as well as the Tornado with its 10-foot (3.0 m) beam. Most Beachcats were limited to a maximum 8-foot (2.4 m) beam but in a peculiar twist of fate, in the US when the trucking union requested permission to drive faster on highways than the then 55 mph (89 km/h) limit, the Federal government instead raised the maximum trailerable width to 8'6", enabling all trailerable boats to be designed 6 inches wider. Boats from the mid-1980s were often then built to the new width, most older designs were not updated however as they were considered 'one designs' and remained unchanged. The mid size beachcats intended for two persons or more will usually weigh about 400 lb (180 kg) (typical 18 foot). Handling beachcats on the beach is commonly aided using 'beach wheels', essentially an aluminum pole as an axle with two large lightweight tires that do not sink into the sand enabling the boat to be rolled about by one or two persons.

=== Pacific ===
One early beachcat, the Pacific cat, appeared in 1960 in California. The Pacific cat was designed by Carter Pyle and was first built in 1960. It was slightly smaller than 19 ft × 8 ft (5.8 m × 2.4 m), and was a solid fiberglass catamaran with a solid core deck and traditional catamaran sail plan. The design's chief limitation was its weight of over 500 lb (230 kg) with approximately 300 square feet (28 m^{2}) of sail area. The design was a traditional design with dagger boards and a hard deck. By comparison, the Aqua Cat 12 weighed 160 lb (73 kg) and could easily be carried by two people, and the mast raised by one person.

Photos of the Pacific cat demonstrate that it was adept at handling the daunting Pacific coast surf, probably due to the momentum it carried even with the limited (for the time) sail plan. Pacific cats were made by Newport Boats / Mobjack Manufacturing.

=== Aqua ===
In the United States, Art Javes designed and marketed an early fiberglass catamaran sailboat, the Aqua, in 1961. The Aqua was a 12-foot-long fiberglass hulled cat, which featured two flat-bottomed, foam filled, symmetric fiberglass hulls. These hulls were connected with aluminum tubing that supported a trampoline-style deck that was large enough for several people. It also featured an unusual "lateen rigged" sail that was supported by a rigid aluminum A-frame. The mast itself was topped with a Styrofoam float that helped insure that a capsizing, (especially in shallow water that could damage the mast), would be easily righted and result only in the boat going part way over. If capsized it was designed to rest on one hull, with the ball at the top of the mast preventing it from going fully inverted. The flat bottomed hulls made it a beach-friendly catamaran, but its reliance on dagger boards meant it had a draft of 2 ft with the dagger boards in position.

Art Javes partnered with Billy Mills to produce about 1,000 boats a year for a 10-year run. The Aqua was made by American Fiberglass Corp from 1962 to 1972. Originally based in Norwalk, Connecticut, the company was in the sailboat division of General Recreation Corp in Charleston, SC as of 1970. Around 1976, an employee purchased the Aqua product line and it is still available from American Sail, Inc. in Charleston, South Carolina. With more than 30,000 boats shipped, the Aqua was inducted into the National Sailing Hall of Fame in 2001, and is still in production today.

The original Aqua cat 12 was modified to an improved Aqua Cat 12.5 and is also available as an Aqua Cat 14 Catamaran which features upturned hulls and is available in an easier sailing resort model. The 14 ft (4.3 m) model uses small keels to replace the dagger boards found on the smaller Aqua cats. There was also an 18ft prototype that featured cushioned 6ft long seats located above the hulls.

=== Hobie ===
In 1961, Hobie Alter was selling surfboards at an Anaheim boat show where he met Art Javes and the Aqua Cat 12. Shortly after this boat show, Hobie entered the catamaran business as well. The Hobie Cat was introduced in 1965 and borrowed some features from the Aqua Cat. The fledgling catamaran sailboat business benefited from both designs, which each found popularity at many beach resorts.

Hobie Alter acknowledged other influences on the design of his 1965 Hobie Cat. was heavily influenced by the Molokai and Honolulu beach cats of the 25–40 ft (7.6–12.2 m) range, used to take tourists on rides off the beach. These "beach cats" had been in use since at least the 1950s as a commercial venture, though GIs in World War II mention them in memoirs (inter alia, James Jones [cite]). The unique feature of these designs were asymmetrical hulls, a naval architecture term for hulls that are perpendicular (flat) on the outside of the hull, but curved on the inside. The design allows lateral resistance upwind, without the need for a skeg, daggerboard or centreboard. The Hobie Cat was the only design of the early three that did not use dagger boards, although now it offers designs with dagger boards and skegs. When running in and out of the surf, the lack of dagger boards or center boards makes "beaching" almost effortless.

The resulting and nearly ubiquitous Hobie is now the most recognized beach cat of the last thirty years. It combines the structure of the earlier Aqua with the asymmetrical hull design of the Molokai style, and the beaching ability of the Pacific cat. Combining these features, along with optional skeg and daggerboard options, Hobie created a catamaran that could easily sail on and off the beach through the surf. The brilliance of the initial Hobie design was the combination of the asymmetrical hull design with the smaller, surf "friendly" layout. Without dagger boards but with a large sail area to weight ratio (the "16" weighed 325 lb (147 kg) at its inception and, with over 350 ft^{2} (33 m^{2}) of sail), the initial Hobie designs were able to sail into and out of heavy surf safely. The asymmetric hulls reduced lateral drift which made dagger board-dependent designs more difficult to handle in unfavorable winds or over extended shallow areas where dagger boards could not be deployed.

Within a few years of the Hobie design (particularly the "16"), other designers adopted the modifications in their improved beachcat designs.

== Post-1972 designs ==
=== Prindle ===
The Prindle Cat, introduced in 1972, sought to improve on the basic Hobie design by increasing the forward buoyancy with an almost vertical sheer (a trend that is currently the vogue in forward design, see, the 2011 Hobie "Wild Cat" F18 design and most of the current cruising designs from Fountaine Pajot, Dolphin, Privilege and Lagoon).

The Prindle Cats, initially 16- and 18-ft designs, were comparable to the Hobies but were remarkable for their resistance to "pearling" (in surfer parlance) or "pitch poling" (in sailing vernacular). Even a well-sailed Hobie 16 was (and still is) quite capable of burying a hull and pitching end-over-end. The Prindles, with more forward buoyancy, resist this tendency, allowing more forward weight balance in heavier air (wind speed), although Prindles are still capable of pitch-poling given the right combination of forward weight, wind and sea conditions. Although out of production, the Prindle 16 is still in good supply on the used market, but the asymmetrical hulled 18s are rare.

Prindle moved into the classes production in the early 1990s, with the development of the Prindle 19, a well designed, fast and balanced ship. The Prindle 19 class continues to grow but is at best a borderline "beach cat", with more of an emphasis on hydrodynamically linear hull design and the use of dagger boards.

=== Diversification ===
The Prindle and Hobie were by no means the only beach cats in the early 1970s. Deviating from the raised platform and asymmetrical design typified by the Hobie 14 and 16, and the asymmetrical designs with the cross members set at deck level, as typified by the Prindle, new designs sprang up between 1972 and 1980, which sought to "ride the wave" (so to speak) to the Hobie success story. Some survived, but others produced only a few hundred (or even dozen) hulls and passed into naval architecture history. Those surviving and prospering included the speedsters from North American Catamaran Racing Association (NACRA) and the glass-fibre British Tornado design, which became an Olympic design for the 1984 Los Angeles Games but was (amongst much controversy), dropped from the 2012 London Games.

Designs that briefly prospered but were out of production by the early 1980s included the Sol Cat, the CatYak from Dayton Marine and the Alpha Cat, all with a fuller bow section design but none garnering enough success (financial or popular), to remain in production. The Shark Catamaran was also produced and popularized throughout the Great Lakes Region.

After the Hobie 14/16 and Prindle 16/18 "era", beach cat manufacturers increasingly moved away from the asymmetrical designs which moved easily on and off the beach, and focused on theoretically faster symmetrical designs, including the aforesaid Prindle 19, the Hobie 18, the Nacra 5.2 and the Boston Whaler "SuperCat 20". The influence of the Tornado as an Olympic class beginning in 1984 cannot be underestimated in the emphasis placed on symmetrical, dagger board based models. The Tornado, with its estimated thirty knot top speed, and Olympic panache, contributed to the continuance development of faster and faster "beach cats", which, theoretically, could sail in and out of the surf, but in reality, were much more adept at one design racing. Hence, the development of the F (for Formula) 18 class certification.

== See also ==
- List of multihulls
- Turtling
