= Broach (nautical) =

Abrupt, involuntary change in course

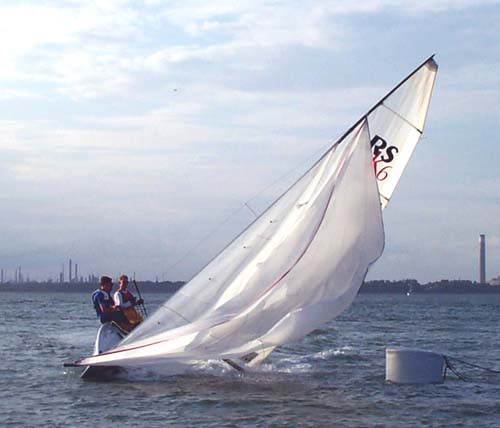
RS K6 Keelboat broaching, caused by wind action.

A broach is an abrupt, involuntary change in a vessel's course, towards the wind, resulting from loss of directional control, when the vessel's rudder becomes ineffective. This can be caused by wind or wave action. A wind gust can heel (lean) a sailing vessel, lifting its rudder out of the water. Both power and sailing vessels can broach when wave action reduces the effectiveness of the rudder. This risk occurs when traveling in the same general direction as the waves are moving. The loss of control from either cause usually leaves the vessel beam-on to the sea, and in more severe cases the rolling moment may cause a capsize.

An alternative meaning in the context of submarine operation is an unintended surfacing of a shallow-running submarine in a deep wave trough.

== Causes ==
=== Wind ===
Broaching caused by wind action may occur when a vessel is sailing away from the wind and its sails are suddenly overpowered by a gust of wind, causing it to heel excessively. Heeling alters the rudder's orientation, away from vertical, reducing the horizontal force which water can apply as it flows past the rudder. In extreme cases, heeling can raise the rudder out of the water. With loss of directional control, the vessel turns into the wind. In the process, the vessel may heel close to horizontal and may capsize. Such loss of control may be preceded by oscillations of the vessel's mast and course, as the person steering attempts to maintain control.

=== Waves ===
Any vessel that is traveling in the same direction and close to the same speed as large waves (relative to the vessel) risks losing directional control when the stern is lifted in the water by an overtaking wave. Near the crest of a large wave, the orbital motion of the upper part of the wave is in the same direction as the vessel's course and can be close to the same speed as the vessel. When the orbital motion of the wave minimizes the velocity of the rudder through the surrounding water, the rudder loses effectiveness and steering is compromised. The vessel is likely to swing across the waves, roll to one side, and perhaps capsize. Naval architects have only recently started to produce workable mathematical models of broaching: the complexity is due to the non-linear nature of the phenomenon. What is well understood is that "wave riding" (traveling at the same speed as the waves) creates a substantial risk of broaching. Wave action may contribute to a broach initiated by wind gusts.

== See also ==
- Glossary of nautical terms (disambiguation)
