= Edwin J. Prindle =

American patent administrator (died 1948)

Edwin Jay Prindle (born c. 1868 - died December 17, 1942) contributed to the development of the current U.S. patent law system.

== Biography ==
Edwin Jay Prindle was born in Washington, D.C. He was senior member of Prindle, Neal & Bean, a law firm on Wall Street in New York City. He was president of the New York Patent Law Association. He is credited with bringing improvements to the U.S. patent law system. He worked in the US Patent Office until 1899, then set up his own patent practice in 1905. Held posts of the Secretary of the Patent Committee of the National Research Council and later Chairman of the Patent Committee of the American Chemical Society.

He wrote a number of documents on the subject of patent law, most notably a set of articles entitled "Patents in Manufacturing Business". These formed the ideological basis for companies' use of the patent system as a protectionist tool of private research and development. He was an advocate of the patent system in general, but most notably as a fundamental tool of business and corporate control over rivals.

Prindle was elected an honorary member of the American Society of Mechanical Engineers in 1939.

Prindle married and had two daughters. He died on December 17, 1942, aged 74, at his home in Montclair, New Jersey.
