= Capsizing =

Action where a vessel turns on to its side or is upside down

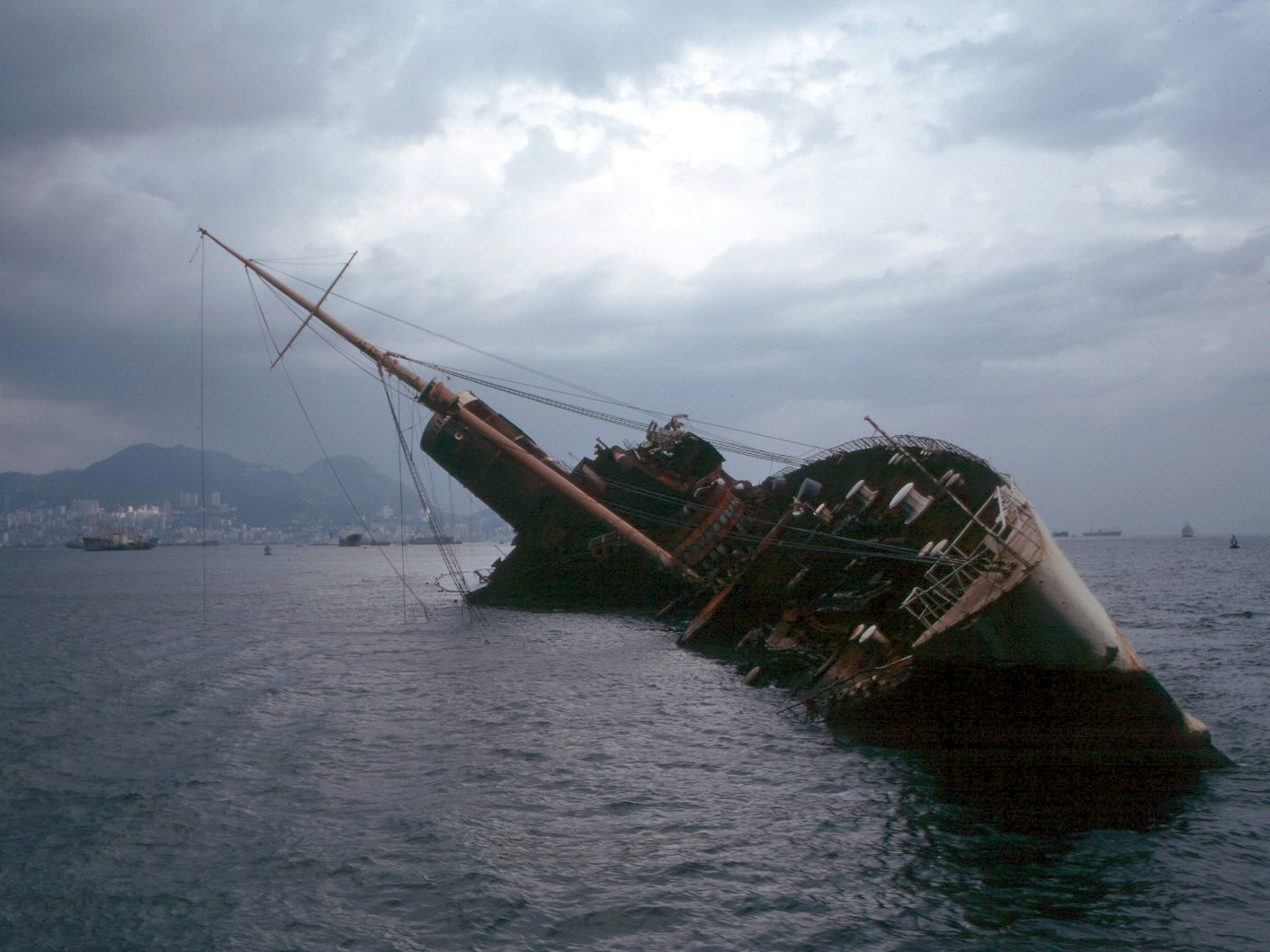
Seawise University capsized after being gutted by fire in 1972

Capsizing or keeling over occurs when a boat or ship is rolled on its side or further by wave action, instability or wind force beyond the angle of positive static stability or it is upside down in the water. The act of recovering a vessel from a capsize is called righting. Capsize may result from broaching, knockdown, loss of stability due to cargo shifting or flooding, or in high speed boats, from turning too fast.

If a capsized vessel has enough flotation to prevent sinking, it may recover on its own in changing conditions or through mechanical work if it is not stable while inverted. Vessels of this design are called self-righting.

== Small vessels ==
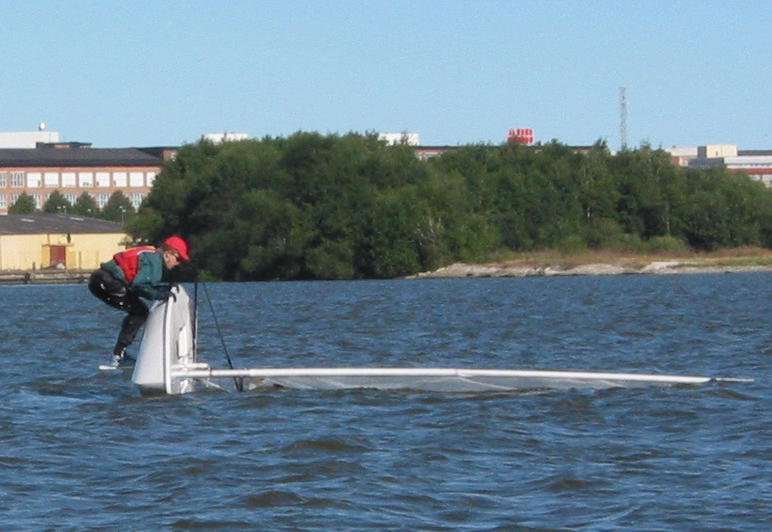
Righting a capsized Laser sailing dinghy by standing on the daggerboard

In dinghy sailing, a practical distinction can be made between being knocked down (to approximately 90 degrees; on its beam-ends, figuratively) which is called a capsize, and being inverted, which is called being turtled. Small dinghies may often capsize in the normal course of use and can usually be recovered by the crew.

Capsizing (but not necessarily turtling) is an inherent part of dinghy sailing. Many have described it as "not a question of 'if' but a question of 'when'." For those who do not want the experience, a keelboat monohull has physics on its side. But even yachts can capsize and turtle in extraordinary conditions, so design considerations are important. Such events can overcome skill and experience; boats need to be appropriate for foreseeable conditions.

A kayak roll, after intentional capsizing

A capsized kayak may be righted with a roll or eskimo rescue. As long as the kayaker knows how to react, the water is not too shallow, and the location is not close to dangers that require evasive action by the kayaker – which cannot be taken while capsized – capsizing itself is usually not considered dangerous. In whitewater kayaking, capsizing occurs frequently and is accepted as an ordinary part of the sport. Kayak rolling, in which paddlers intentionally capsize and right themselves (in synchrony, as many times as possible in a given interval, or in as many different ways as possible) is also a competitive sport, especially in Greenland.

Sailing vessels' "capsize ratio" is commonly published as a guideline for zones of safe operation — less than 2.0 means as a rule-of-thumb suitability for offshore navigation. However its crude nature of displacement divided by a vessel's beam (breadth) (albeit with a constant multiplied to provide an average assessment), means thorough assessment of ship stability, immersibility and buoyancy involves other factors to address the relevant risks posed by waves, tides, weather and occurrences such as damage and collision.

== Large vessels ==
SS Venore fully capsized after being torpedoed by a German submarine in World War II

In a storm, even large vessels may be rolled by being hit broadside by a large wave or swell or pitchpoled stem over stern in extreme waves. This is normally catastrophic for larger ships, and smaller yachts can be dismasted (i.e., lose their masts and rigging) due to the drag as the boat is forced to roll over.

A ship that sustains a hole or crack ('is holed') may capsize. This is the working of torpedo and naval mine warfare. In 2012 the very large cruise ship Costa Concordia'' was holed and lost her propulsion by striking a charted rock, and drifted further where she partially sank just outside the harbor entrance, coming to rest with her starboard side submerged and resting on the seafloor with approximately two-thirds of her structure above the sea. This was not a capsize as her bottom was only partly exposed; rather this was a partial sinking. Fixing a hole is called plugging.

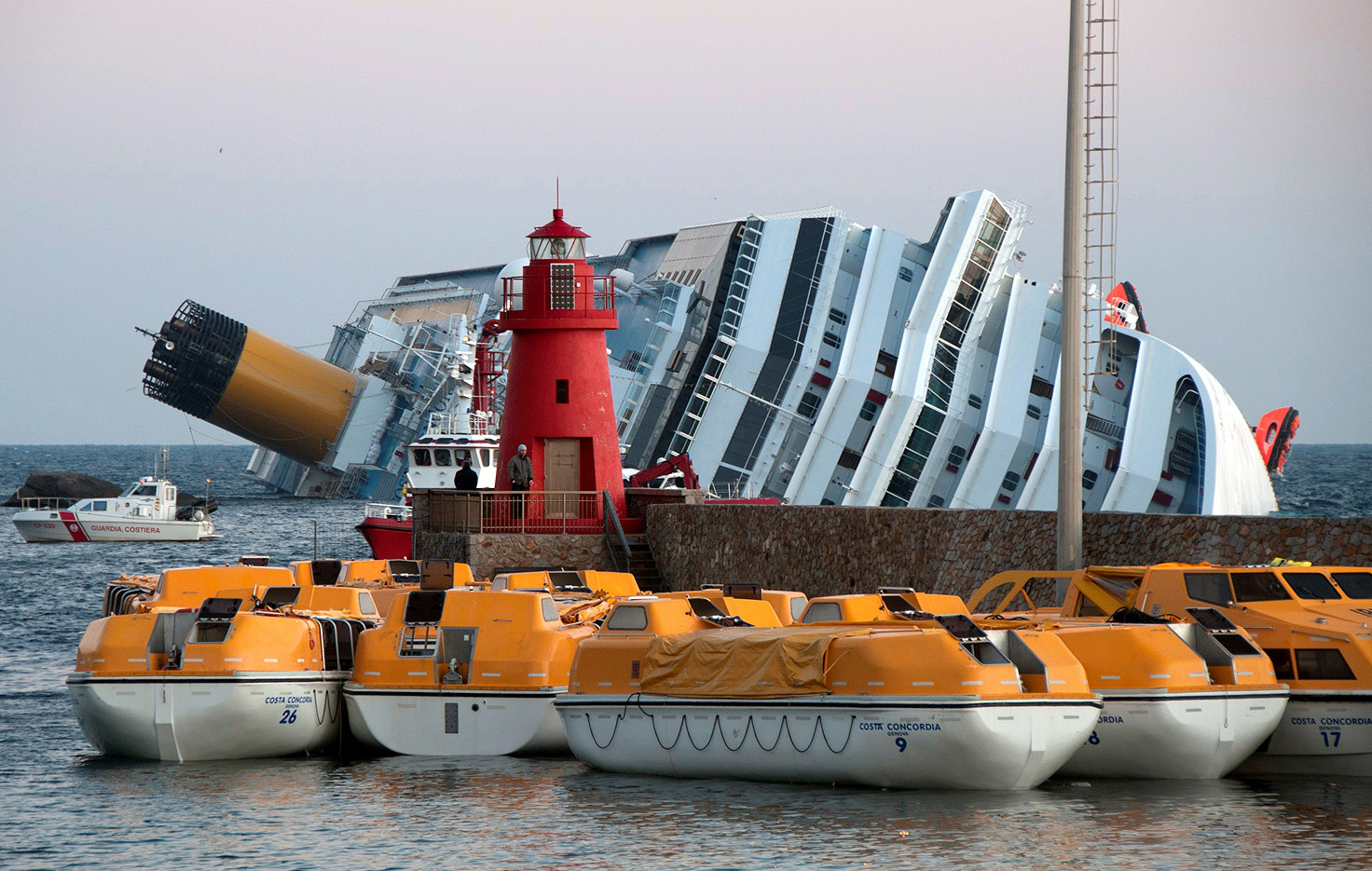
The Costa Concordia after sinking and running aground

Otherwise a vessel in largely upright position which capsizes has suffered too much water to enter in places normally above the waterline, and which may be caused by poor manoeuvering, overloading (see Plimsoll Line) or poor weather. As for holes, bailing may be carried out – removal of water aboard such as with a bilge pump, self or hand bailer, buckets or de-watering pumps. At the stage of sinking where its buoyancy is deemed critical, the ship is unlikely to upright nor able to right itself such that stability and safety will be compromised even if the vessel is righted – a decision is made to abandon ship and any ultimate salvage may entail firm grounding and re-buoyancy pumps. Among ship types, a roll-on/roll-off ship is more prone to capsizing as it has large open car decks near the waterline. If the watertight car-deck doors fail through damage or mismanagement (as in the partial sinking of Herald of Free Enterprise where the doors were accidentally left open, and as in one of the largest peacetime maritime disasters when MS Estonia sank off of the Archipelago Sea in Finland), water entering the car-deck is subject to the free surface effect and may cause a capsize. As a RORO ferry rolls, vehicles can break free and slide down if not firmly secured, adversely altering the ship's centre of gravity, accelerating the roll, and possibly turning an otherwise recoverable roll into a capsize.

== Competition ==
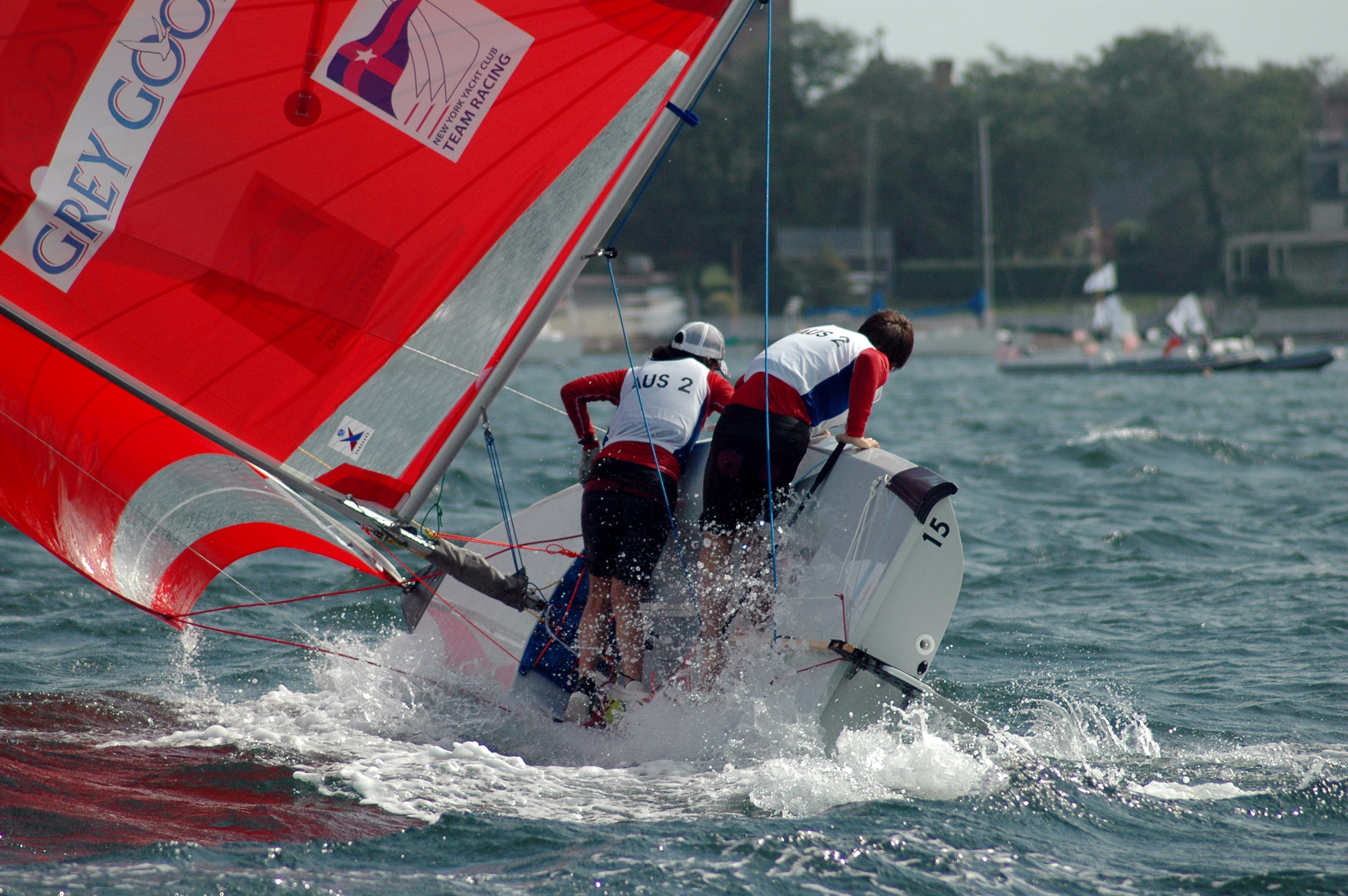
A team at the 2005 ISAF Team Racing World Championship narrowly avoids capsizing.

In competitive yacht racing, a capsized boat has certain special rights as it cannot maneuver. A boat is deemed capsized when the mast is touching the water; when it is fully inverted, it is said to have turned turtle or turtled. Good racers can often recover from a capsize with minimal loss of time.

The capsize can result from extreme broaching, especially if the keel has insufficient leverage to tilt the vessel upright.

Some rescue lifeboats, for example the RNLI's Severn class, are designed to be self-righting if capsized, but most other motorboats are not.

== Training ==
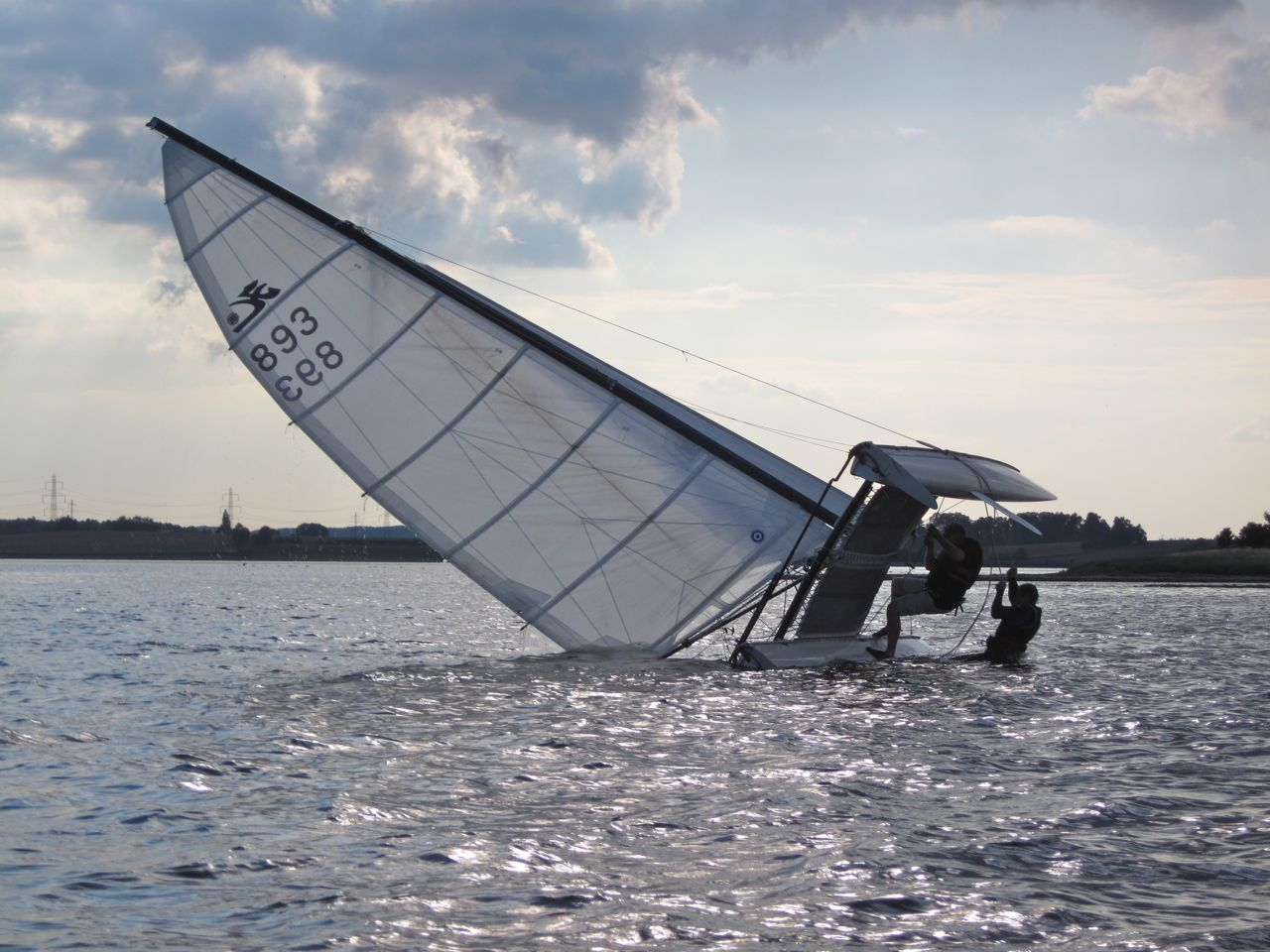
Righting a capsized Hobie Cat

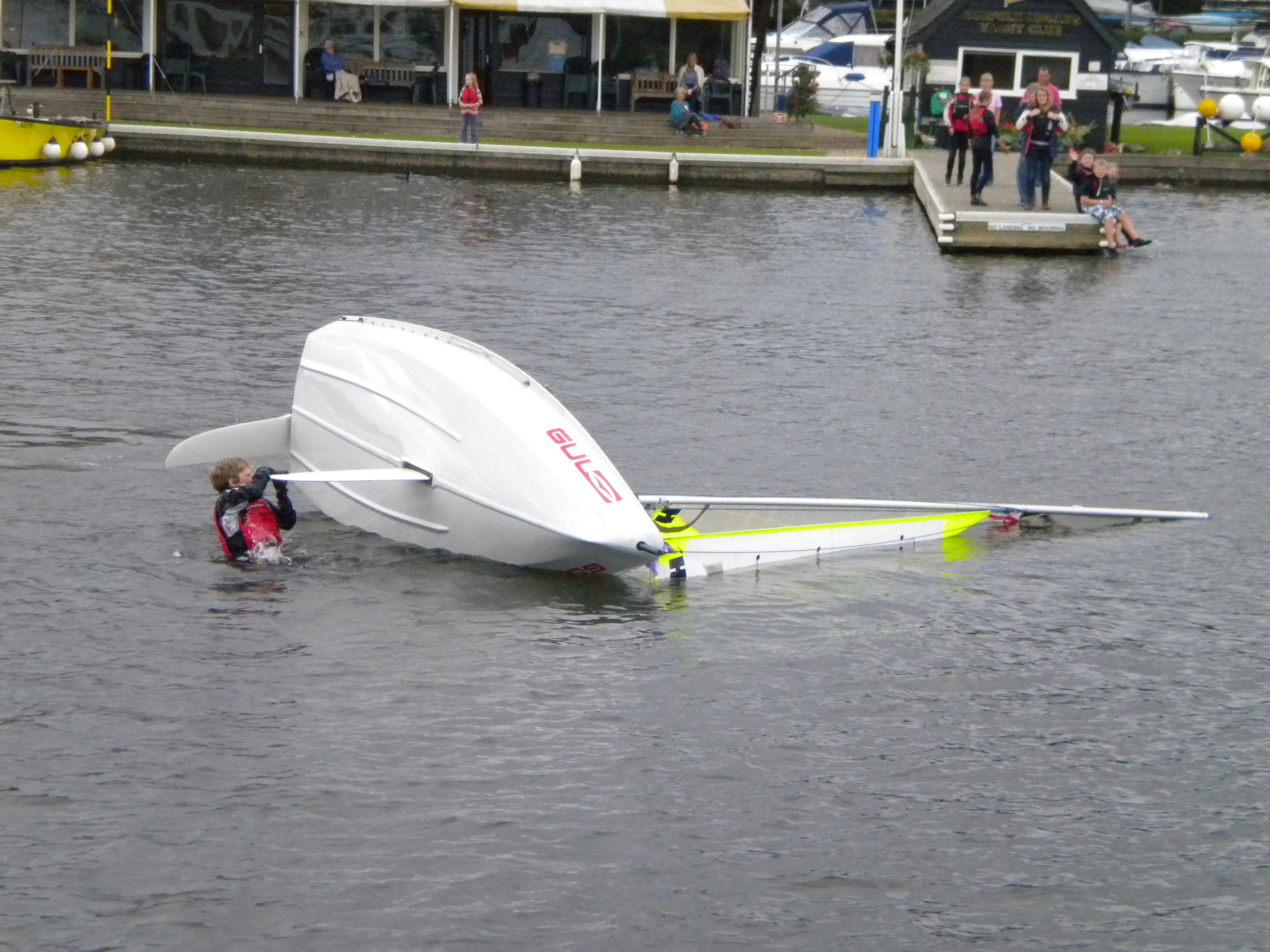
Practice: righting a sailing dinghy after a deliberate capsize on Wroxham Broad

Intermediate sailors are encouraged to capsize their dinghies in a safe location with supervision at least once to become acquainted with their boat's floating properties and the capsize process. The boat is then righted, bailed out, and the sails reset, so that in the event of an uncontrolled capsize, the boat and its occupants are familiar with the procedure and may recover.

Most small monohull sailboats can normally be righted by standing or pulling down on the centreboard, daggerboard (or bilgeboard in a scow) to lift the mast clear of the water. Depending on the design of the hull, the boat's righting moment will normally take effect once the mast is around 30 degrees from horizontal and help pull the boat vertical. Righting a catamaran that is lying on its side involves using a righting line fed over the upper hull. The crew stands on the lower hull and pulls back on the righting line. In small catamarans such as the Hobie 16 it is imperative that at least one crew member assumes this task as soon as possible as there is a chance that the boat will turtle and then become extremely difficult to recover without assistance. Some monohulls and catamarans use a small flotation device mounted at the tip of the mast or mainsail to ensure that the craft cannot assume an inverted position, or at least that a fully inverted position is not stable (i.e. it would come to a position where the mast is lying on the surface of the water, which would be preferable to fully inverted).

In both cases, having a crew member lift the end of the mast out of the water may help speed the process, as the greatest challenge of righting a capsized boat is shedding the weight of the water from the sails. A helpful step, where possible (on a loose footed sail), is to disconnect the clew of the sail from the boom, which prevents the sail from scooping up water as the sail lifts out of the water. The bow of the capsized vessel should be pointed towards the wind so that when the sail starts to lift out of the water the wind can catch underneath the sail and help right the boat.

Care is taken not to let the boat swing all the way over and capsize on the other side, frequently with the crew on the bottom. This is more likely if the boat is not pointed into the wind.

== Prevention ==
There is a wide range of technology that can be installed or strategically placed to prevent or deter a boat or ship from capsizing. The various technologies rely on inflating airbags also known as lift bags which increasing the vessel's buoyancy with the water. There are many steps a crew can take to reduce the chance of capsizing, such as distributing the weight evenly and taking care during windy weather.

=== Yachts ===
Capsizing in yachts can occur when water is able to infiltrate the hull and decrease the vessels water and buoyancy leading to capsizing. Yachts can be deployed with a flotation system which is a series of strategically placed lift bags within the interior of the hull increasing the vessel's buoyancy and filling void space where water can collect, providing valuable time to remove the water, fix damage or evacuate.

=== Large ships ===
When larger ships such as cargo ships and tankers capsize or sink not only is recovery not possible but great environment damage can occur from spillage of cargo. Larger ships are being equipped with Surfacing System for Ship Recovery which is an inflatable device that is installed in the ballast water tank or within the hull of the vessel and can be deployed within seconds of an accident to stabilize the vessel and give more time for rescue and evacuation.

== Self-righting ==
A vessel may be designated as "self-righting" if it is designed to be able to capsize then return to upright without intervention (with or without crew on board). The angle of vanishing stability, the angle of heel at which a vessel becomes unstable and does not bob back upright, does not exist; a self-righting boat will return to upright from any position, including completely upside-down. A self-righting vessel must be positively buoyant when swamped. There are three methods of making a vessel self-right: careful distribution of stationary weight and buoyancy, inflatable airbags, and movable ballast.

A basic tool for calculating a vessel's stability is a static stability diagram, which plots the angle of heel on the horizontal axis and the righting lever (GZ) on the vertical axis. (see metacentric height for details). If the static stability curve never crosses the x-axis, the boat is not stable upside-down. This is not sufficient to build a boat with good stability at sea, as it neglects the effects of wind, waves, and human occupants, but it is a simple, powerful way to analyze the stability of a vessel. See also primary stability and secondary stability.

Self-righting through distribution of weight and buoyancy requires the weight low-down, and the buoyancy high up. It is often accomplished with a self-sealing superstructure, such as the large deckhouses on modern rescue boats.

From the mid-twentieth century onward, self-righting became a common feature of purpose-built rigid lifeboats, particularly in larger all-weather lifeboats. Some smaller craft use manually deployed righting devices or have to be righted by their crews.

Small radio-controlled boats may also self-right. This is particularly useful for racing.

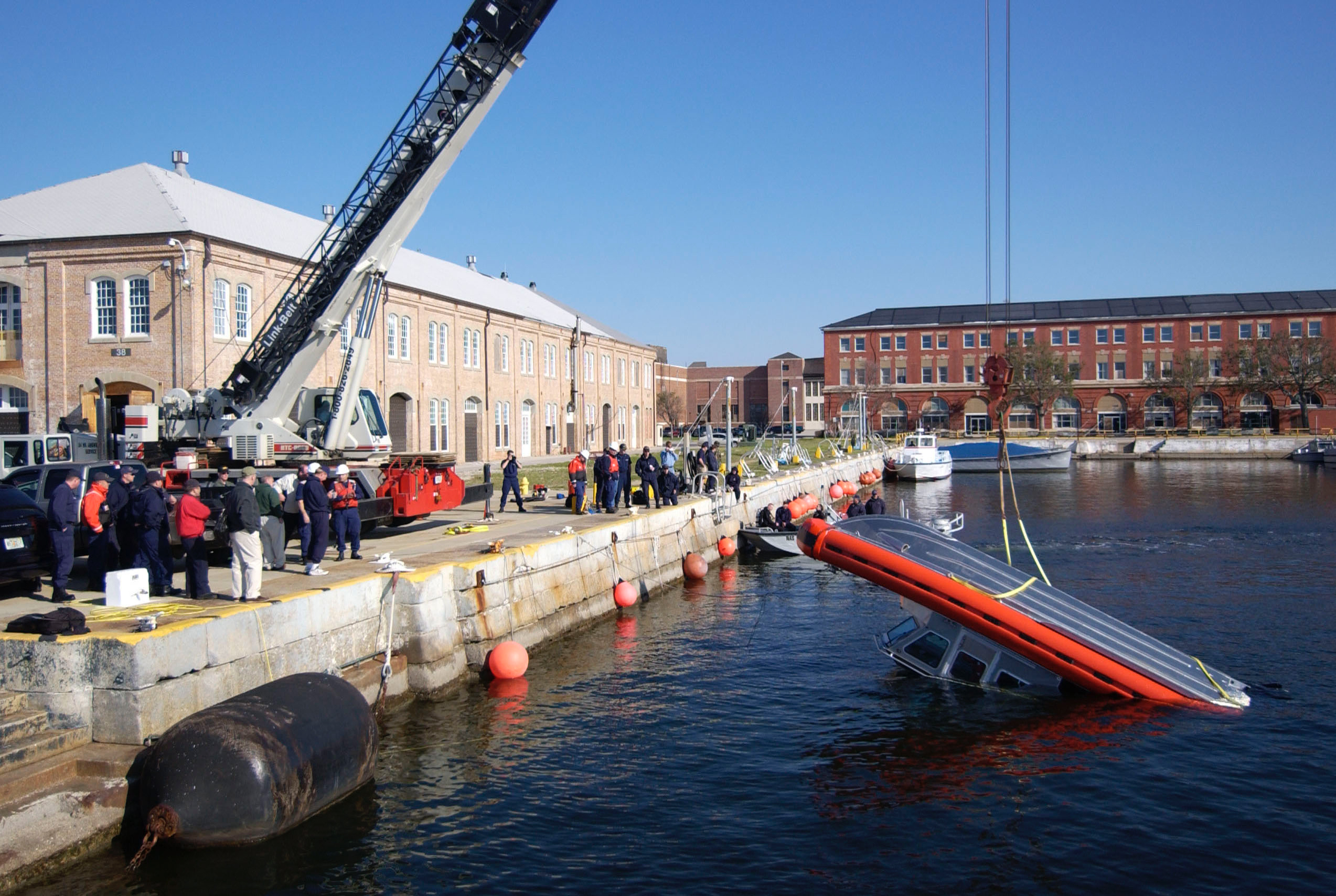
A crane capsizes a small coast guard vessel to test its righting ability

Animation of a larger self-righting vessel's stability test. Note large deckhouse, which is almost the only part submerged when fully inverted.

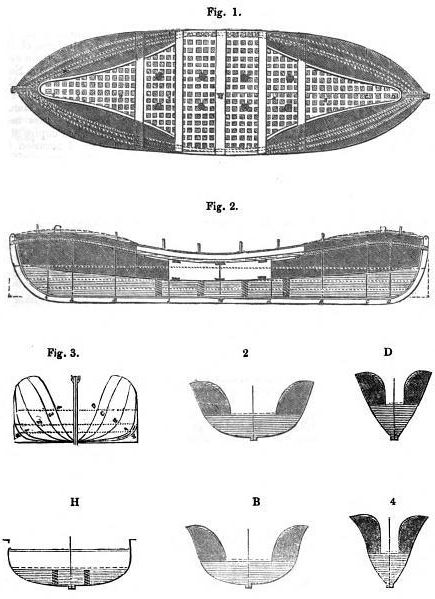
The Beeching-Peake SR (self-righting) lifeboat won an 1851 competition for improved lifeboat design. Drawings show large, high buoyancy tanks, and ballast.

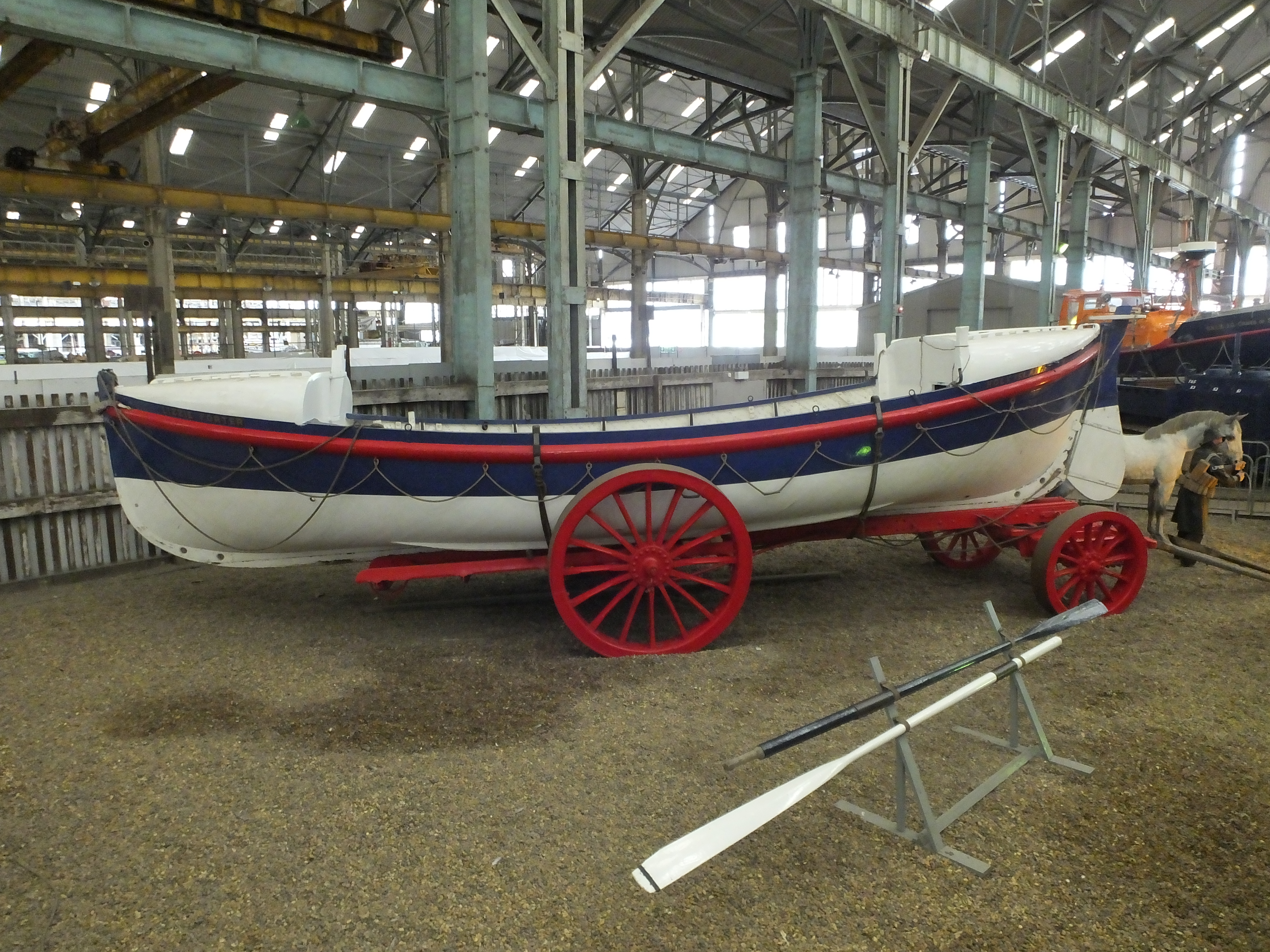
The Lizzie Porter is a Peake-class lifeboat, an early design of self-righting boat. Note the high, rounded buoyancy tanks at her bow and stern, and low sides amidships.

== Notable capsizings ==
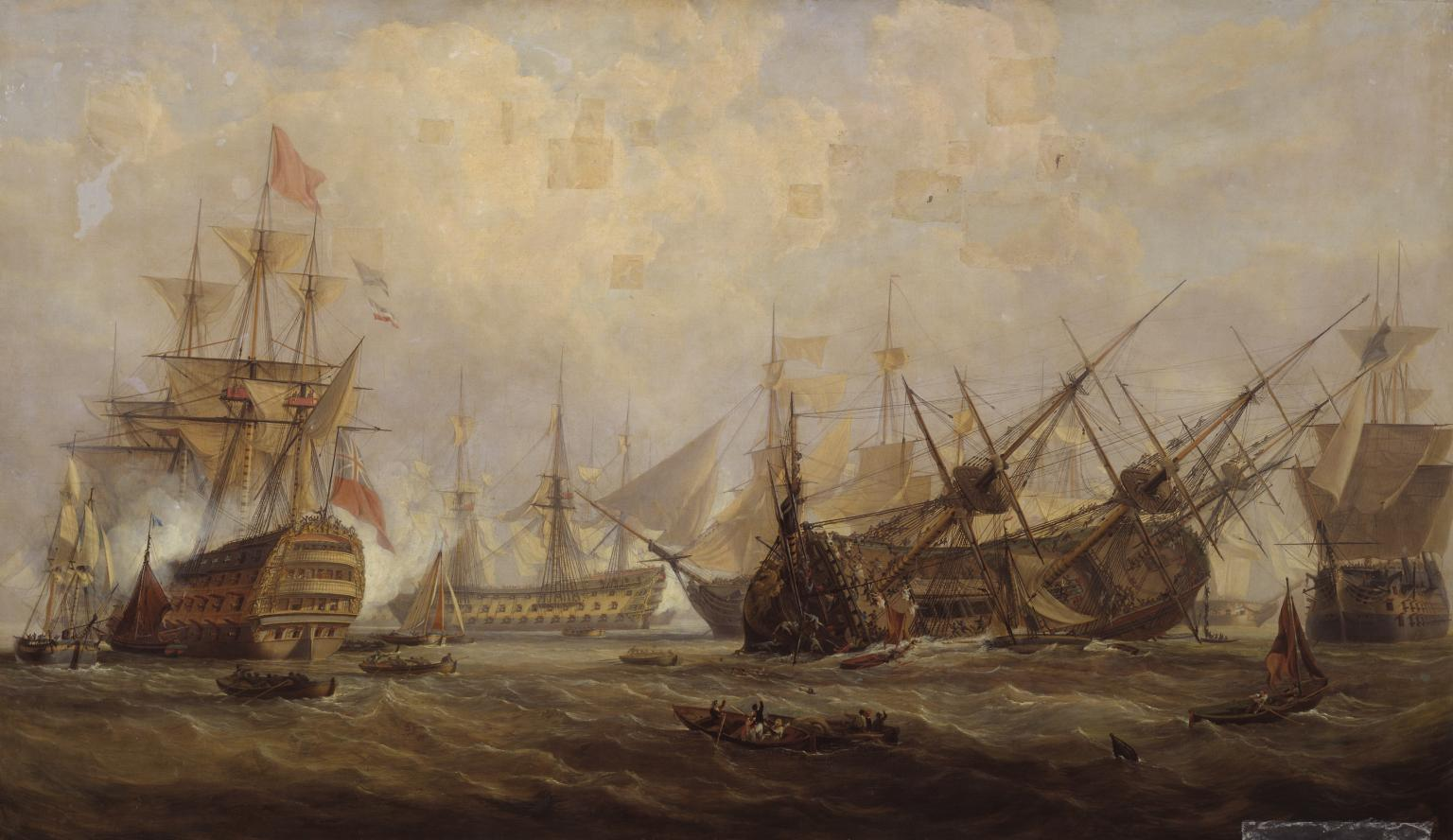
Loss of the Royal George by John Christian Schetky

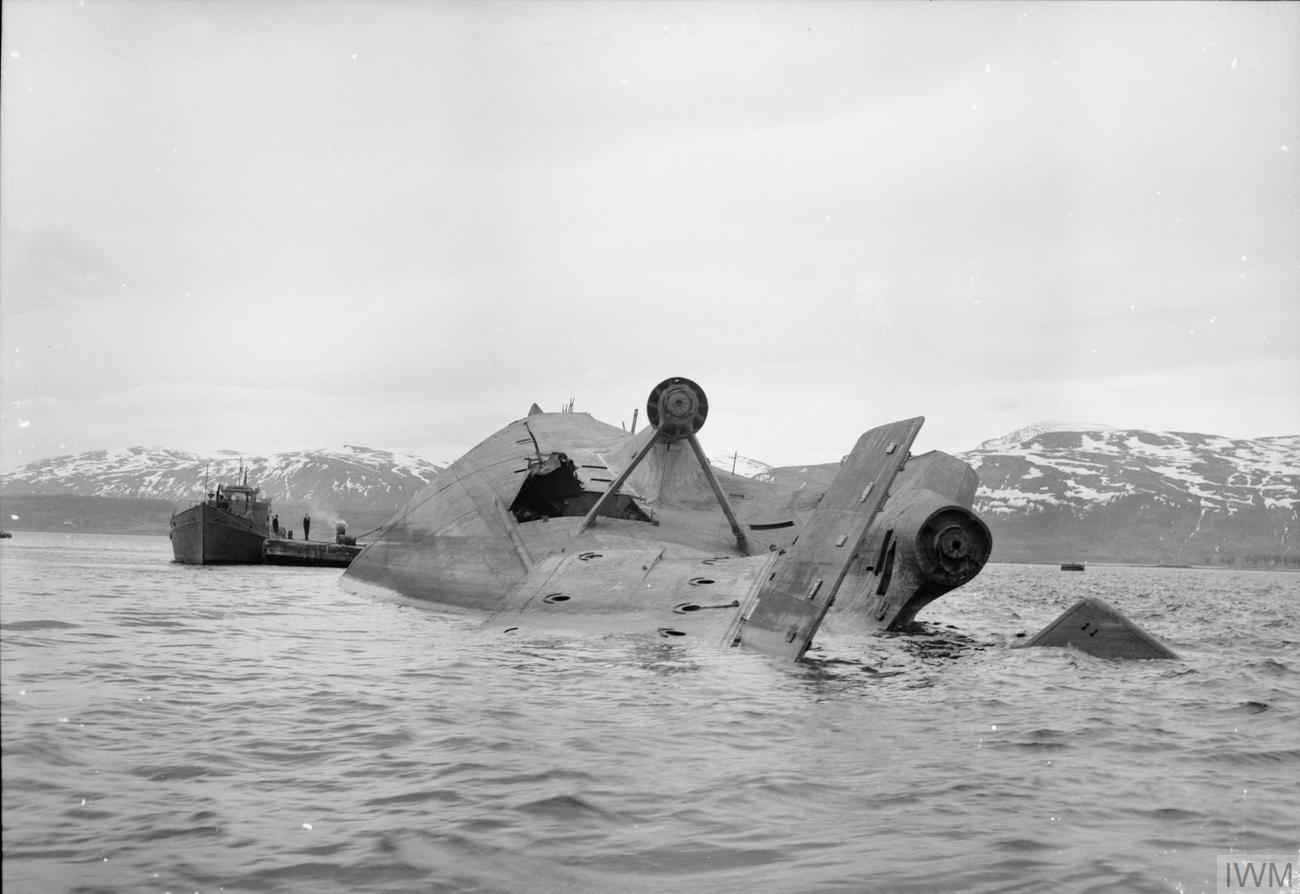
German battleship Tirpitz lying capsized in Tromsø fjord after the Operation Catechism air raid, attended by a salvage vessel.

- Mary Rose, 19 July 1545, capsized and sank, English carrack, 380 dead.
- Vasa, 10 August 1628, Swedish warship, maiden voyage, 30–50 dead.
- Codseeker, 9 May 1877, Canadian fishing schooner, maiden voyage, 4 dead, 2 trapped in hull rescued three days later.
- RMS Empress of Ireland, 19 May 1914, capsized and sank in the Saint Lawrence River after colliding with the Norwegian collier Storstad, 1,012 dead.
- HMS Monmouth, 1 November 1914, British armoured cruiser sunk with all hands at the Battle of Coronel, 734 dead.
- SMS Blücher, 24 January 1915, German armoured cruiser, sunk at the Battle of Dogger Bank, 770 dead.
- SS Eastland, 24 July 1915, excursion boat, 844 dead, greatest loss of life on the Great Lakes.
- SMS Szent István, 10 June 1918, Austro-Hungarian capital warship, torpedoed, 89 dead.
- Scuttling of the German fleet at Scapa Flow, 21 June 1919, several German battleships and battlecruisers scuttled.
- HMS Royal Oak, 14 October 1939, torpedoed and sunk by German U-boat U-47, 835 dead.
- German battleship Bismarck, 27 May 1941, sunk after sinking HMS Hood, over 2000 casualties.
- HMS Barham, 25 November 1941, torpedoed four times by German U-boat U-331, rolled over to port within 4 minutes before exploding, 862 dead.
- USS Oklahoma, 7 December 1941, U.S. battleship torpedoed at Pearl Harbor, 429 missing or killed.
- HMS Repulse, 10 December 1941, attacked and sunk by Japanese aircraft, 517 dead.
- HMS Prince of Wales, 10 December 1941, attacked and sunk by enemy Japanese aircraft, 328 dead.
- USS Lafayette (AP-53), formerly SS Normandie, 9 February 1942, at dock while being converted to a troopship, one casualty.
- Japanese aircraft carrier Ryūjō, 24 August 1942, sunk by American air attacks, 120 casualties.
- Japanese battleship Kirishima, 15 November 1942, 212 casualties.
- German battleship Scharnhorst, 26 December 1943, sunk during the Battle of the North Cape, 1,932 dead.
- Japanese battleship Musashi, 24 October 1944, sunk during the Battle of Sibuyan Sea, 1,023 casualties.
- Japanese battleship Fusō, 25 October 1944, sunk during the Battle of Surigao Strait, approximately 1890 casualties.
- Japanese battleship Yamashiro, 25 October 1944, sunk during the Battle of Surigao Strait, 1,626 casualties.
- German battleship Tirpitz, 12 November 1944, sunk by Royal Air Force bombers, over 1,000 casualties.
- Japanese aircraft carrier Shinano, 29 November 1944, sunk by American submarine USS Archerfish (SS-311), 1,435 casualties.
- Japanese battleship Yamato, 7 April 1945, 2,475 dead.
- Soviet battleship Novorossiysk, 29 October 1955, 608 dead.
- SS Andrea Doria, 25 July 1956, killing 46 passengers at the area of the impact with the MS Stockholm.
- HMS Coventry, 25 May 1982, killing 19 sailors, sunk by three 1000 lb bombs dropped from Argentine A-4 Skyhawks.
- Herald of Free Enterprise, 6 March 1987, bow door left open, killing 193 passengers.
- MS Jan Heweliusz, 14 January 1993, leaving 54 people dead.
- MS Estonia, 28 September 1994, killing 852 passengers.
- MS Express Samina, 26 September 2000, 82 dead.
- MV Le Joola, 26 September 2002, Senegalese ferry, at least 1,863 dead.
- MV Rocknes, 19 January 2004, Dutch rock discharge vessel, capsized south of Bergen, Norway, killing 18 of 30 crew.
- MS al-Salam Boccaccio 98, 3 February 2006, resulting in an estimated 1,020 dead.
- MV Demas Victory, 30 June 2009, which sails to offshore oil and gas platforms capsized off the coast of Qatari capital city of Doha.
- Costa Concordia, 13 January 2012, ran aground off the island of Giglio, western Italy, with about 4,200 aboard, all except 32 saved.
- Sewol, 16 April 2014, approximately three kilometres off Gwanmae Island, South Jeolla Province, South Korea, with over 450 people on board, 304 dead, 172 survivors.
- Dongfang Zhi Xing, 1 June 2015, large vessel capsized and sank cruising the Yangtze River in Jianli, Hubei: thunderstorm downburst with high winds, with 442 dead and 12 survivors.
- MV Sinar Bangun, 18 June 2018, at Lake Toba, North Sumatra, Indonesia, 3 known dead and 164 presumed so; 23 known survivors. Overloaded and improper three-deck use/design caused high uprighting moment (centre of gravity).
- MV Phoenix, 5 July 2018, hit fellow tourist boat MV Serenita; both capsized and sank in a sudden storm near Phuket, Thailand. Double-decker: 41 dead and 15 missing, 49 survivors; smaller boat carried 42 passengers, all saved.
- MV Nyerere, 20 September 2018, ferry shuttling people and cargo on Lake Victoria, Tanzania due to pilot distraction when docking, a sharp turn and overloading. 227 known dead, passenger log lost, tens survived.
- Golden Ray, 8 September 2019, automobile carrier in St Simons Sound off the US state of Georgia, improperly ballasted and heeled over during sharp turn. All 23 crewmembers and the harbor pilot were rescued.
- Orient Queen, 5 August 2020, at Beirut as a result of nearby 4 August ammonium nitrate explosion.
- Wonder Sea, 19 July 2025, tourist boat capsized and sank during high winds at Hạ Long Bay, Vietnam. 39 dead and 10 survivors.
- United States, 11 November 2026, developed a severe port list, capsized, and slipped beneath the waves during controlled sinking. Self-righted upon hitting the seabed.

== See also ==
- Glossary of nautical terms (disambiguation)
- keeling over
- Limit of positive stability
- Seakeeping, also called Seaworthiness
- Seamanship
- Turtling (sailing) – a full capsize in which the mast and sail are fully submerged.
