= Initial stability =

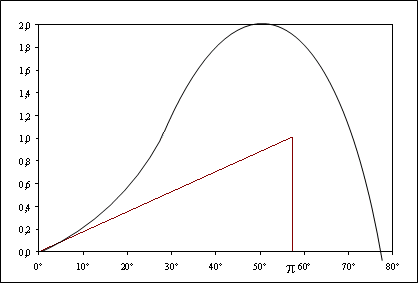
Primary stability plotted at 1 radian (the stability curve follows the straight line until about 4-7 degrees)

Initial stability or primary stability is the resistance of a boat to small changes in the difference between the vertical forces applied on its two sides. The study of initial stability and secondary stability are part of naval architecture as applied to small watercraft (as distinct from the study of ship stability concerning large ships).

== Determination ==
The Initial stability is determined by the angle of tilting on each side of the boat as its center of gravity (CG) moves sideways as a result of the passengers or cargo moving laterally or as a response to an external force (e.g., a wave).

The wider the boat and the further its volume is distributed away from its center line (CL), the greater the initial stability.

== Examples ==
Wide mono-hull small boats such as the johnboat have a great deal of initial stability and allow the occupants to stand upright to engage in fishing activities, and so do narrower small boats such as W-kayaks that feature a twin hull.

Very narrow mono-hull boats such as canoes and kayaks have little initial stability, but twin-hull W-kayaks are considerably more stable due to the fact that their buoyancy is distributed at a greater distance from their center line and therefore acts more effectively to reduce tilting. For purposes of stability, it is advantageous to keep the centre of gravity as low as possible in small boats, so occupants are generally seated. Flatwater rowing shells, which have length-to-beam ratios of up to 30:1, are inherently unstable.

== Compared to secondary stability ==
After approximately 10 degrees of lateral tilt, hull shape gains importance, and secondary stability becomes the dominant consideration in boat stability.

== Other types of ship stability ==
- Secondary stability
- Tertiary stability: For kayak rolling, tertiary stability, or the stability of an upside-down kayak, is also important (lower tertiary stability makes rolling up easier)

== See also ==
- Ship stability
- Kayak#Types of stability
- Limit of positive stability – boats
