= Beam (nautical) =

Width of a ship at its widest point

Graphical representation of the dimensions used to describe a ship. Dimension "b" is the beam at waterline.

The beam of a ship is its width at its widest point. The maximum beam (B_{MAX}) is the distance between planes passing through the outer sides of the ship, beam of the hull (B_{H}) only includes permanently fixed parts of the hull, and beam at waterline (B_{WL}) is the maximum width where the hull intersects the surface of the water.

Generally speaking, the wider the beam of a ship (or boat), the more initial stability it has, at the expense of secondary stability in the event of a capsize, where more energy is required to right the vessel from its inverted position. A ship that heels on her beam ends has her deck beams nearly vertical.

== Typical values ==
Typical length-to-beam ratios (aspect ratios) for small sailboats are from 2:1 (dinghies to trailerable sailboats around 20 ft or 6 m) to 5:1 (racing sailboats over 30 ft or 10 m).

Large ships have widely varying beam ratios, some as large as 20:1.

Rowing shells designed for flatwater racing may have length to beam ratios as high as 30:1, while a coracle has a ratio of almost 1:1 – it is nearly circular.

== Rule of thumb - formula ==
The beam of many monohull vessels can be calculated using the following formula:

$$Beam = LOA^\frac{2}{3} + 1$$

Where LOA is Length OverAll and all lengths are in feet.

Some examples:

- For a standard 27 ft (8.2 m) yacht: the cube root of 27 is 3, 3 squared is 9 plus 1 = 10. The beam of many 27 ft monohulls is 10 ft (3.05 m).
- For a Volvo Open 70 yacht: 70.5 to the power of 2/3 = 17 plus 1 = 18. The beam is often around 18 ft (5.5 m).
- For a 741 ft (226 m) long ship: the cube root is 9, and 9 squared is 81, plus 1. The beam will usually be around 82 ft (25 m), e.g. Seawaymax.

As catamarans have more than one hull, there is a different beam calculation for this kind of vessel.

== Beam on centerline ==
BOC stands for Beam On Centerline. This term in typically used in conjunction with LOA (Length overall). The ratio of LOA/BOC is used to estimate the stability of multihull vessels. The lower the ratio the greater the boat's stability.

The BOC for vessels is measured as follows: For a catamaran: the perpendicular distance from the centerline of one hull to the centerline of the other hull, measured at deck level. For a trimaran: the perpendicular distance between the centerline of the main hull and the centerline of either ama, measured at deck level

== Other beams ==
Other meanings of 'beam' in the nautical context are:

- Beam – a timber similar in use to a floor joist, which runs horizontally from one side of the hull to the other athwartships.
- Carlin – similar to a beam, except running in a fore and aft direction.
- Beam – the direction across the vessel, perpendicular to fore-and-aft; something lying in that direction is said to be abeam.

== Notes ==
- Hayler, William B.; Keever, John M. (2003). American Merchant Seaman's Manual. Cornell Maritime Pr. ISBN 0-87033-549-9.
- Turpin, Edward A.; McEwen, William A. (1980). Merchant Marine Officers' Handbook (4th ed.). Centreville, MD: Cornell Maritime Press. ISBN 0-87033-056-X.
