= Sail batten =

Part of sailboats

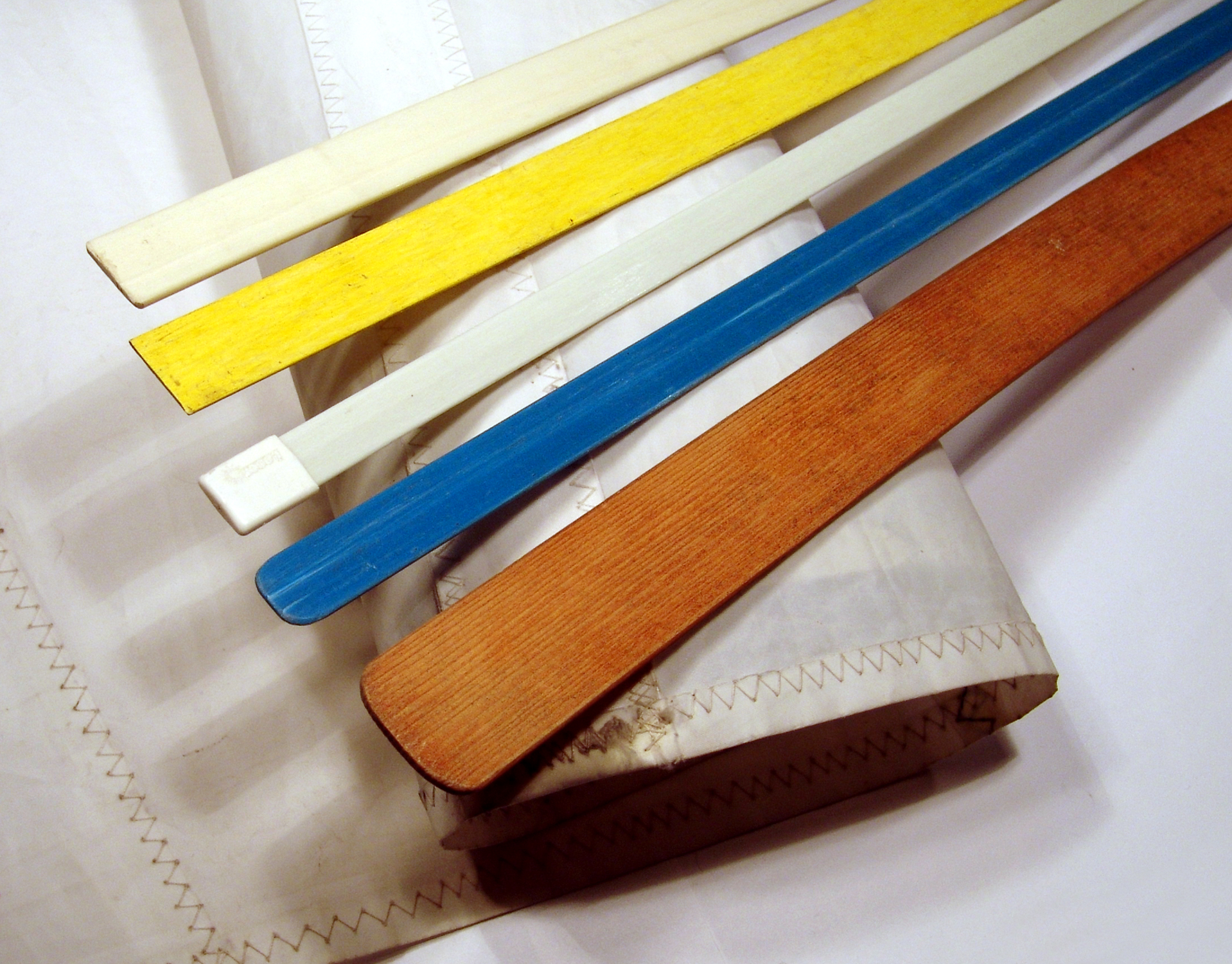
Selection of sail battens.

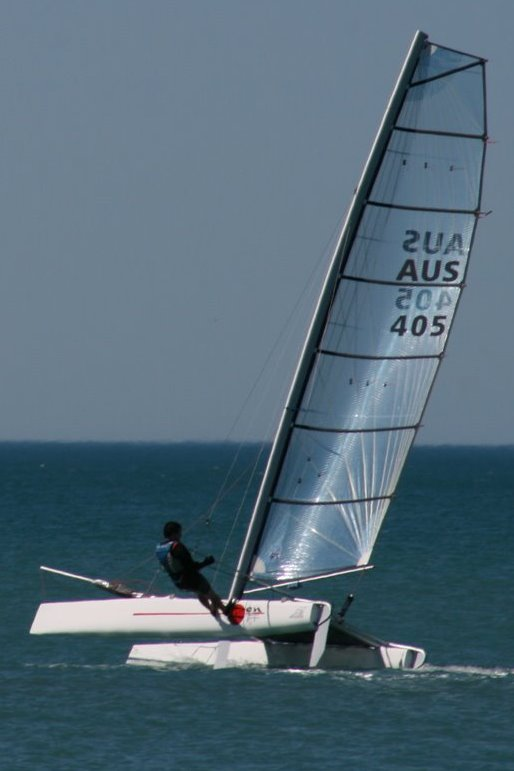
Catamaran with full-length battens on the mainsail.

On sailboats, a sail batten is a flexible insert in a sail, parallel to the direction of wind flow, that helps shape its qualities as an airfoil. Battens are long, thin strips of material, historically wooden but today usually fiberglass, vinyl, or carbon fiber, used to support the roach of a sail. They are also used on tall ships to form the ladders up the shrouds in a fashion similar to ratlines.

== History ==
Battened sails are commonly found in junk ship. A junk is an ancient Chinese sailing ship design that is still in use today. Iconographic remains show that Chinese ships before the 12th century used square sails. A ship carving from a stone Buddhist stele shows a ship with square sail from the Liu Sung dynasty or the Liang dynasty (ca. 5th or 6th century). Dunhuang cave temple no. 45 (from the 8th or 9th century) features large sailboats and sampans with inflated square sails. A wide ship with a single sail is depicted in the Xi'an mirror (after the 9th or 12th century). Eastern lug sail, which used battens and is commonly known as "junk rig", was likely not Chinese in origin: The oldest depiction of a battened junk sail comes from the Bayon temple at Angkor Thom, Cambodia. From its characteristics and location, it is likely that the ship depicted in Bayon was a Southeast Asian ship. The Chinese themselves may have adopted them around the 12th century CE. Their rigs featured full-length battens that facilitated short-handed sail handling, including reefing.

== Applications in sails ==
The most common use of sail battens is in the roach of a mainsail. The batten extends the leech past the line that runs from the head and the clew of the sail to create a wider sail towards the top. Cruising sailboats may have four to six battens. Racing sailboats may have full-length battens, as well, that allow for better sail shape. Batten length near the head of the sail is limited by the need for the roach to pass ahead of the backstay, when tacking or jibing. Battens are also found in jibs of beach-cat catamarans.

== Batten materials and construction ==
Most modern battens are fiberglass pultrusions with a thin, rectangular cross section. An alternative shape is a hollow tube that rotates in the batten pocket and is more compatible with roller furling the mainsail. Because the ends of battens are likely to chafe the sail at the ends of the pockets into which they are inserted, they often have a soft, blunt shape affixed to them.
