= Trampoline (multihulls) =

Woven decking on multi-hull sailboats

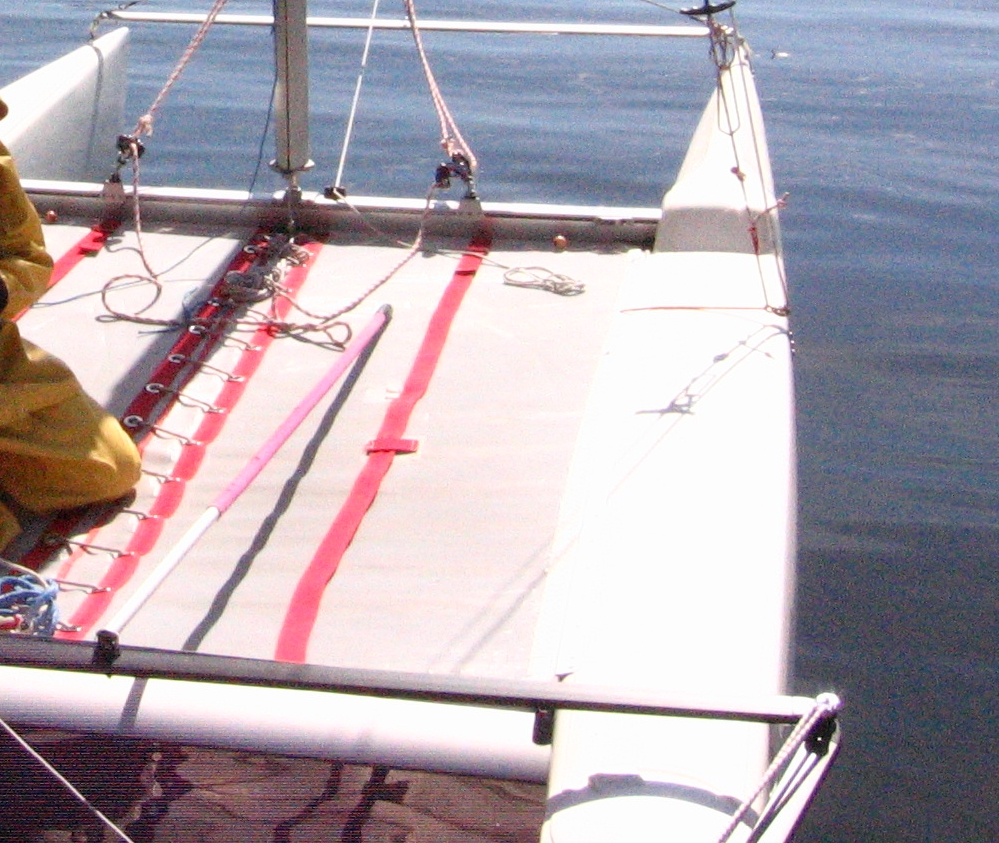
The trampoline on a small sailing catamaran

A sailboat trampoline is a very high strength material under high tension, woven together in strips to provide flat areas in between hull members on catamarans or trimarans. This results in a lightweight decking that allows water to pass through, as holes are intentionally left in the weave for this purpose. It allows the crew to move about on it and most trampolines also serve as tension components of the sailboat structure along with the rest of the rigging.
