= Esse =

Esse may refer to:

== Places ==
- Essé, a commune in the Ille-et-Vilaine department, Brittany, northwestern France
- Esse, Charente, a commune in the Charente department, Nouvelle-Aquitaine, southwestern France
- Esse, Cameroon, a town and commune in Cameroon
- Esse, Finland, a former municipality of Finland, now a village of Pedersöre
- Esse (Diemel), a river of Hesse, Germany, tributary of the Diemel
- ESSE Purse Museum, a handbag museum in Little Rock, Arkansas
- Halsbrücker Esse, a smokestack near Freiberg

== Organizations ==
- Daihatsu Esse, a Japanese car
- Esse (cigarette), a South Korean brand of cigarettes
- Esse stoves, ESSE is a United Kingdom brand of heating appliances
- EsseGesse, an Italian team of cartoonists
- European Society for the Study of English, an organization for university teachers and researchers in English Studies

== People ==
- Tetha, also known as S. Esse, a 5th-century virgin and saint in Wales and Cornwall
- Herb Esse (1920–2000), Australian rules footballer
- Parker Esse, American choreographer
- Esse Akida (born 1992), Kenyan footballer
- Esse Baharmast, football referee
- Romain Esse (born 2005), English footballer

== Other uses ==
- esse arts + opinions, a contemporary art magazine
- Esse 850, a racing sportboat
- Esse 990, a racing sportboat
- the Latin term meaning "to be", see being
  - Esse quam videri, a Latin phrase meaning "To be, rather than to seem"
  - De bene esse, a Latin phrase meaning "well being"
  - In esse, a Latin phrase meaning "in existence"
