= Esse 990 =

Racing sportboat

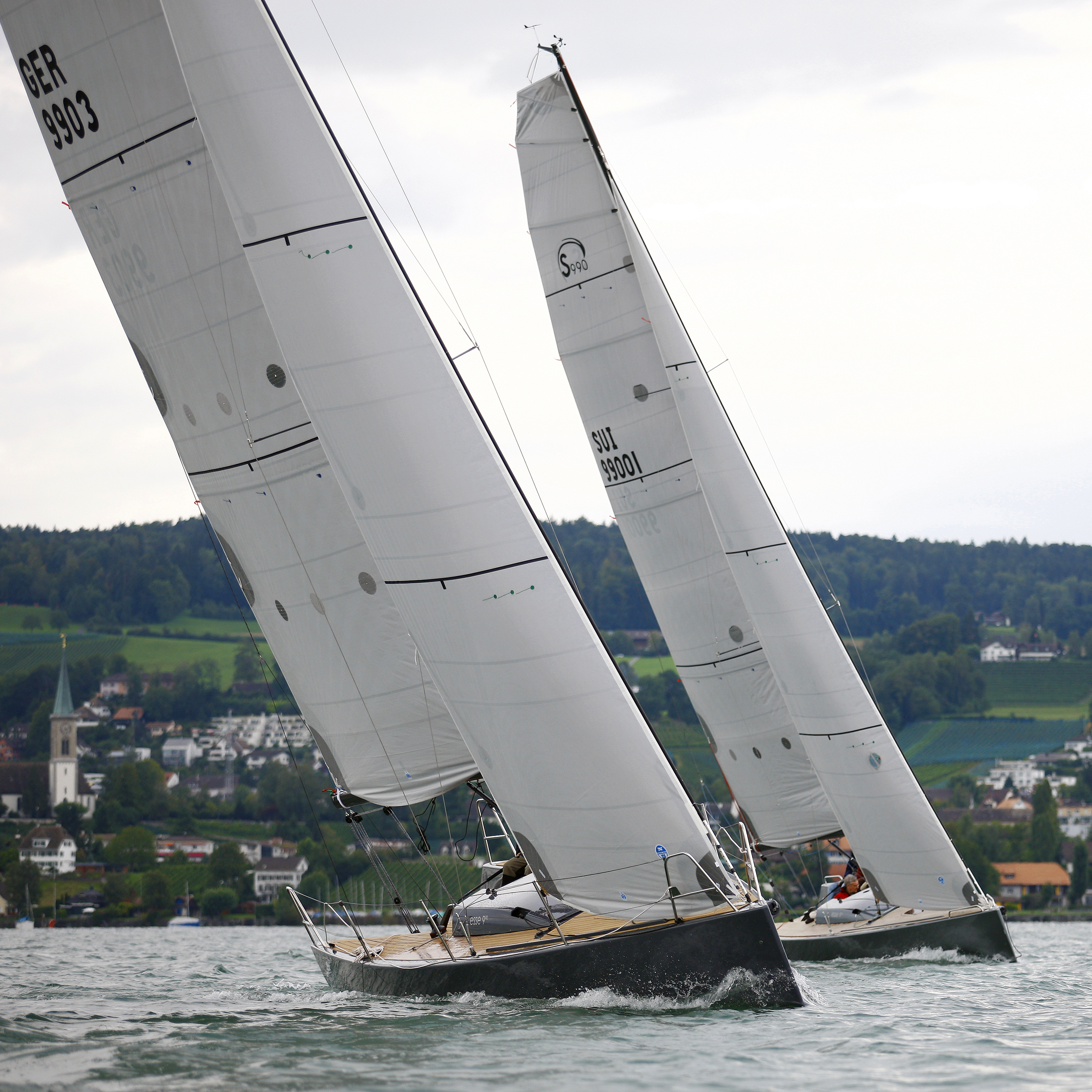

The Esse 990 is a 9.9-meter-long (32-foot) racing sportboat designed by Umberto Felci and built by Josef Schuchter Sportboats of Stafa, Switzerland. The first hull was sold in 2008 and series production was begun in 2009.

The design is an outgrowth of the success of the Esse 850 which had over 110 boats in the one-design fleet by mid-2009. The design is a very powerful sportboat capable of being raced as a daysailer or as an IMS rated coastal racer. It is a very high performance sportboat designed to be raced with a crew of 4 sailors. The design also includes a self-tacking jib to ease handling. Auxiliary propulsion is provided by a 15-horsepower (11 kW) saildrive.

The design is characterized by a large ballast to displacement ratio and a relatively narrow hull of 2.55 meters beam and a tall mast with a high aspect ratio sail plan. In concert with most sportboats, the Esse 990 is designed as an alternative to the complexity of traditional sloop-rigged sailboats, with an emphasis on ease of handling with a small crew and exceptional speeds. Typically, sportboat's such as the Esse 990 are much lighter and more powerful than their traditional counterparts. The reduced weight of the Esse 990 design is a result of the use of PVC-cored, epoxy/E-glass composite sections for the hull and deck. The mast and boom are made from carbon fiber to reduce weight and increase strength. The weight reduction over traditional designs means that a larger percentage of the total weight of the boat is concentrated in the keel providing greater stability and the ability to carry a larger sail plan for greater power.

The weight of the entire boat is 2100 kilograms, including the hull and standing rigging. The design concentrates the righting moment of the keel in a 990 kilogram torpedo-shaped bulb at the end of an airfoil shaped fin. The ballast to displacement ratio is 0.47 which provides a "stiff" and stable platform. The high righting moment allows the design to carry a larger than normal sail area which increases power and consequently speed through the water.

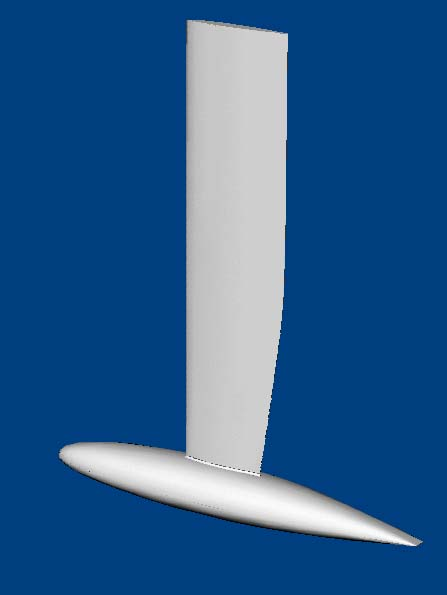

The Esse 990 is an example of the latest design concepts in high speed hulls and sail plans. The sail plan is characterized by a large mainsail and a high aspect ratio jib in a fractional rig design. These high speed fractional rigs are a nearly ubiquitous feature on sportboat's and are used for their ease of handling and their high lift and low drag characteristics.

Hull shapes on sportboat's are typically designed so that the hulls plane at high speeds. These hull designs are characterized by fairly sharp bows to allow them to penetrate waves with reduced drag and a flatter underbody aft of the bow. The flat underbody develops lift as speeds increase and the hull rises higher in the water, which reduces the wetted area and decreases drag, allowing higher speeds to be achieved.

The traditional spinnaker is replaced with a gennaker that is set on an extensible bowsprit. Using a bowsprit allows the size of the gennaker to be a much larger sail than would be possible with a symmetrical spinnaker. The speeds achieved downwind by these designs can be remarkable. In the case of the Esse 990, speeds of 17 knots (20 mph; 31 km/h) are readily achievable in true wind velocities greater than 25 knots (46 km/h) .

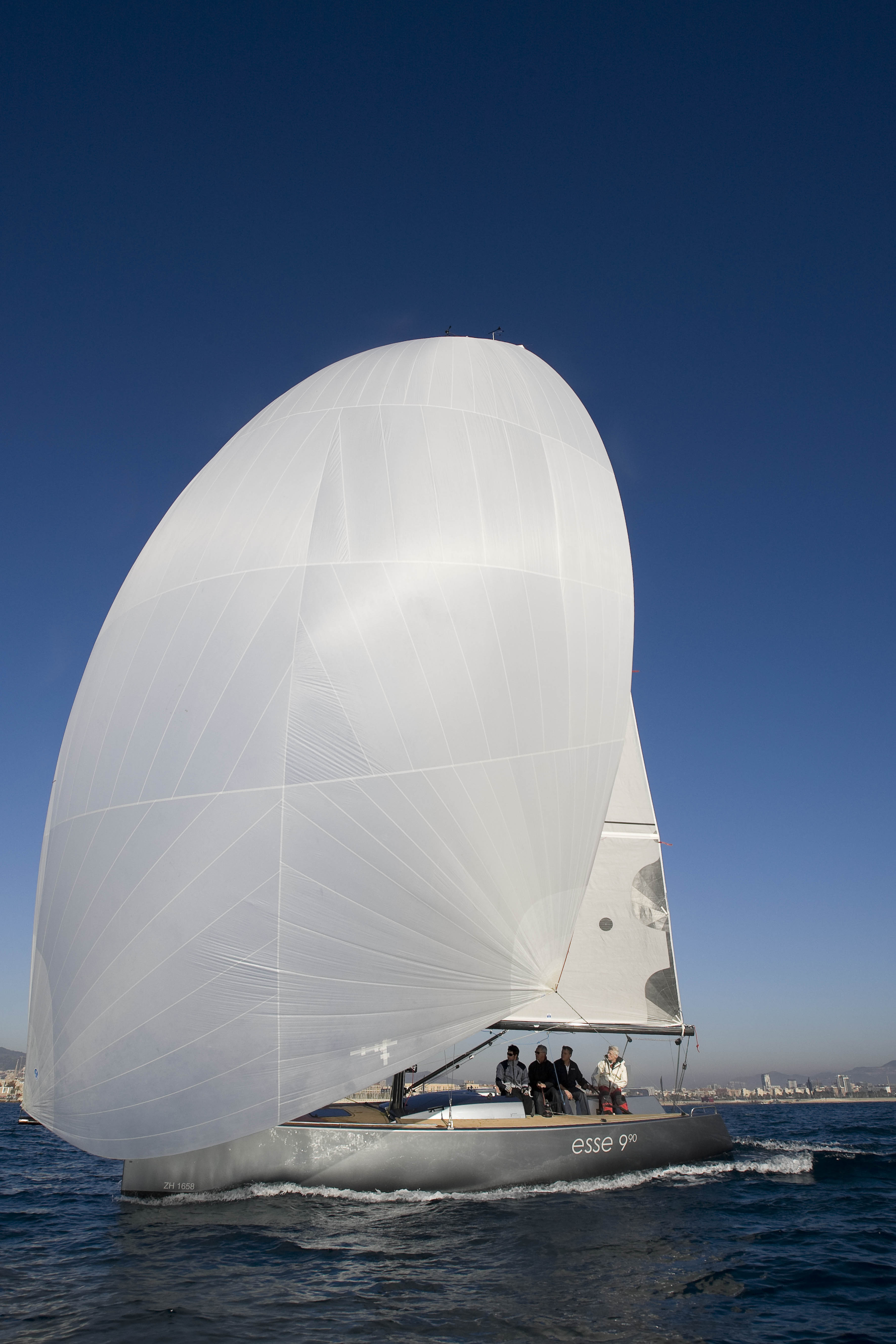

The Esse 990 design was selected as a finalist for the European Sport Boat Of The Year in 2009. Distribution in North America is by Esse Pacific Northwest.
