= Flying Tiger 7.5 =

Sailboat class

Development
- Designer: Robert Perry
- Location: China
- Year: 2009
- Builder: Hansheng Yachtbuilding
- Role: Racer
- Name: Flying Tiger 7.5

Boat
- Displacement: 2,150 lb (975 kg)
- Draft: 6.00 ft (1.83 m) with keel down

Hull
- Type: monohull
- Construction: fiberglass
- LOA: 24.60 ft (7.50 m)
- LWL: 23.16 ft (7.06 m)
- Beam: 8.04 ft (2.45 m)
- Engine: outboard motor

Hull appendages
- Keel: lifting keel with weighted bulb
- Ballast: 1,190 lb (540 kg)
- Rudder: transom-mounted rudder

Rig
- Rig type: Bermuda rig

Sails
- Sailplan: fractional rigged sloop
- Total sail area: 330.00 sq ft (30.658 m^{2})

Racing
- PHRF: 84-93

The Flying Tiger 7.5 is a Chinese trailerable sailboat that was designed by American naval architect Robert Perry as a one design racer. It was first built in 2009.

== Production ==
The design has been built by Hansheng Yachtbuilding in Xiamen, China, since 2009 and remains in production.

== Design ==
The Flying Tiger 7.5 is a scaled-down version of Perry's Flying Tiger 10M design, with more of a design emphasis on family sailing, as the 10 M requires a heavy crew to sail. The 7.5 hull uses aft chines to add stability and make planing easier. The rig was developed with input from sailmaker Bob Pattison of Neil Pryde Sails and the spars were designed by CST Spars of Sydney, Australia. Like the 10 M, this design received a lot of feedback and suggestions via internet forums.

The design is a racing keelboat, built predominantly of E-glass resin infusion process. It has a fractional sloop rig, with a deck-stepped mast, two sets of 28 degree swept spreaders that eliminate the need for a backstay and carbon fiber spars. The hull has a plumb stem with a retractable bowsprit, a slightly reverse transom, a removable transom-hung rudder controlled by a tiller and a lifting keel with bulb weight. The keel is made from fiberglass and carbon biber over a foam core. The rudder is made from carbon fiber and E-glass. The boat displaces 2,150 lb (975 kg) and carries 1,190 lb (540 kg) of ballast.

The boat has a draft of 6.00 ft (1.83 m) with the keel extended. With it retracted, the boat can be operated in shallow water or ground transported on a trailer.

The boat is normally fitted with a small transom-mounted outboard motor for docking and maneuvering.

The design has an unfinished interior, but does have two settee berths for sleeping accommodation.

For sailing downwind the design may be equipped with an asymmetrical spinnaker flown from the bowsprit.

The design has a PHRF handicap of 84 to 93.

== See also ==
- List of sailing boat types
