= Flying Tiger 10 M =

Sailboat class

Development
- Designer: Robert Perry
- Location: China
- Year: 2005
- No. built: 110
- Builder: Hansheng Yachtbuilding
- Role: Racer
- Name: Flying Tiger 10 M

Boat
- Displacement: 4,374 lb (1,984 kg)
- Draft: 7.62 ft (2.32 m) with keel down

Hull
- Type: monohull
- Construction: fiberglass
- LOA: 32.66 ft (9.95 m)
- LWL: 30.31 ft (9.24 m)
- Beam: 9.15 ft (2.79 m)
- Engine: outboard motor

Hull appendages
- Keel: lifting keel with weighted bulb
- Ballast: 1,918 lb (870 kg)
- Rudder: transom-mounted rudder

Rig
- Rig type: Bermuda rig
- I foretriangle height: 39.25 ft (11.96 m)
- J foretriangle base: 12.12 ft (3.69 m)
- P mainsail luff: 40.16 ft (12.24 m)
- E mainsail foot: 14.89 ft (4.54 m)

Sails
- Sailplan: fractional rigged sloop
- Mainsail area: 298.99 sq ft (27.777 m^{2})
- Jib/genoa area: 237.86 sq ft (22.098 m^{2})
- Total sail area: 536.85 sq ft (49.875 m^{2})

Racing
- PHRF: 42-57

The Flying Tiger 10 M is a Chinese trailerable sailboat that was designed by American Robert Perry as a one design racer and first built in 2005.

A smaller and lighter derivative is the Perry-designed Flying Tiger 7.5.

== Production ==
The design was built by Hansheng Yachtbuilding in Xiamen, China, starting in 2005, with 110 boats completed, but it is now out of production.

Early production was marred by quality control issues, but these were later resolved with modifications and production line updates.

== Design ==
The boat's concept was created by Bill Steven, an American racing sailor and boatbuilder from the west coast, who had boats built in China in the past. He commissioned Perry to do a preliminary design for a simple and inexpensive sportboat that would fit in a 40 ft (12 m) shipping container. Perry's design was then circulated though sailing internet forums for feedback and then orders. The concept was well received and Steven was able to collect 50 US$1000 deposits and that enabled production to begin in China.

It was specifically designed to be ground transported on a boat trailer and therefore uses a lifting keel, an easily removable rudder and carbon fiber spars for lightness.

The Flying Tiger 10 M is a racing keelboat, built predominantly of vinylester resin fiberglass over a foam core. It has a fractional sloop rig, with a deck-stepped mast, two sets of swept spreaders and carbon fiber spars. The hull has a plumb stem with a retractable bowsprit, a slightly reverse transom, a removable transom-hung rudder controlled by a tiller and a lifting keel with bulb weight. It displaces 4,374 lb (1,984 kg) and carries 1,918 lb (870 kg) of ballast.

The boat has a draft of 7.62 ft (2.32 m) with the keel extended and 3.28 ft (1.00 m) with it retracted, allowing operation in shallow water or ground transportation on a trailer.

The boat is normally fitted with a small outboard motor for docking and maneuvering, mounted in a cockpit well just aft of the bridgedeck and enclosed by doors.

The design has an unfinished interior, but does have sleeping accommodation under the cockpit and two straight settees in the main cabin.

For sailing downwind the design may be equipped with an asymmetrical spinnaker flown from the bowsprit. Class rules specify a maximum crew weight of 1,050 lb (476 kg).

The design is capable of planing and one reviewer noted it achieving 16 kn (30 km/h). It has a displacement hull speed of 7.38 kn (13.67 km/h) and a PHRF handicap of 42 to 57.

== Operational history ==
The first boat imported into the US was shown at the US Sailboat Show in Annapolis, Maryland in 2007. The first competition was the Sperry Top-Sider NOOD in San Diego in March 2007, with Scot Tempesta winning.

The boat is supported by an active class club that organizes racing events, the Flying Tiger 10M International Class Association.

In a 2007 review for Sailing World, Tom Bessinger wrote, "building boats at a factory halfway around the world with unskilled (at least initially) labor can be difficult, and there are usually a few missteps. The Flying Tiger 10-Meter is no exception. The first few boats came with under-specced tillers, transoms that were underbuilt, and rudder hardware that wasn’t up to the task of handling the loads of the boat's outboard-hung rudder. Poorly designed and built class sails didn't help its debut either. But-and this is important-we saw enough good things to figure out that Steven, Perry, and the denizens of sailinganarchy.com, have delivered exactly what was ordered-an inexpensive sportboat with good performance characteristics."

== See also ==
- List of sailing boat types
