= B&R 23 =

Sailing boat

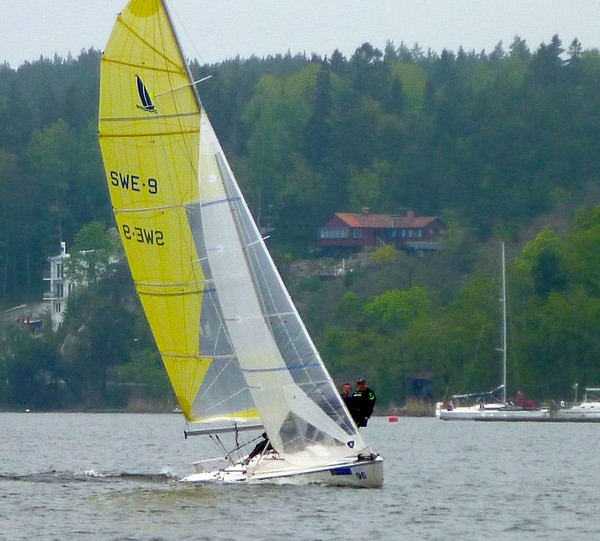

Development
- Designer: Bergström/Ridder/Stillefors
- Location: Sweden
- Year: 1993
- Design: Sportsboat

Boat
- Crew: 2–4
- Draft: 1.5 m (4.9 ft)
- Trapeze: 2

Hull
- Type: Monohull
- Construction: E-glass and polyester resin over divinycell foam
- Hull weight: 420 kg (930 lb)
- LOA: 6.97 m (22 ft 10 in)
- LWL: 6.67 m (21 ft 11 in)
- Beam: 2.44 m (8.0 ft)

Hull appendages
- Keel: retractable keel

Rig
- Rig type: B&R

Sails
- Mainsail area: 22.1 m^{2} (238 ft^{2})
- Jib/genoa area: 10.0 m^{2} (108 ft^{2})
- Spinnaker area: 55.0 m^{2} (592 ft^{2})

The B&R 23 is a sailing boat designed in the early 1990s. It has an ultralight construction with a very large sail plane. Typical crew is a helmsman and two deck hands in trapezes. The boat is predominantly used for racing.

== History ==
B&R 23 was designed by Lars Bergström, Sven-Olov Ridder and Torkel Stillefors.

The idea came from Stillefors, who had been involved in the sail racing circles of New Zealand while living there in the early 1980s. During his time in New Zealand, Stillefors was inspired by the high performance extreme dinghies and ultra light displacement sport boats there. In addition, the 18ft Skiffs in Sydney Harbour were a source of inspiration, and soon Stillefors started contemplate building something similar that could offer similar performance and thrills.

Back in Sweden Stillefors got in contact with Lars Bergström and Sven-Olof Ridder, at the time a famous Swedish inventor/design duo, who became interested in Stillefors' ideas for a new high performance sportsboat. This led them to taking part in the design of a new boat, the B&R 23.

Bergström designed the hull and sail plan at his design office in Sarasota Florida, resulting in a computer printed line drawing, a design technique that was not common practice in those early days of computer-aided design.

Ridder focused on the design of the hydrodynamic detail. Ridder, working as Professor at the Royal Institute of Technology in Stockholm, had previously built scaled models, very similar to the B&R 23, and performed dynamic tank testing on them to verify the hydrodynamic characteristics of the design. At his residence in Stockholm he designed the 32-degree swept back retractable keel and the rudder.

Stillefors took charge of the superstructure, deck layout and equipment design.

In 1993 the first B&R 23 was built at Bergsviksvarvet in Stockholm by Stillefors, and soon the sailors on Lake Mälaren saw a futuristic fast boat with two deck hands on wire swishing past them with water spraying around the bow.

== Design philosophy ==
The B&R 23 is designed with a single guiding principle: it should be very fast.

No considerations were given to any performance limiting handicap or yardstick rules, or other secondary parameters, such as comfort or ease-of-handling. Thus, the philosophy behind B&R 23's design can be said having been "no-holds-barred", that is, a ruthless focus on raw performance.

This resulted in an extremely light (420 kg (930 lb), minimum resistance, high performance apparent wind boat with a huge sail plane, particularly for downwind, where the total sail area is close to 100 m^{2} (1,100 ft^{2})t). The boat is capable of planing in modest winds downwind, and even on upwind the boat performs very well, in parity with much bigger 38–40-foot yachts.

For the hull, Bergström was strongly influenced by Hunter's Child, an Open 60 ultra light weight design, which was built in the early 1990s and raced in the 1994–95 BOC Challenge.

The B&R 23 is equipped with the patented B&R Rig. The main characteristics of the rig include:

- two rigid struts supporting the lower section of the mast
- no backstays
- 30 degree swept spreaders
- double diamond shrouding

Benefits of the B&R rig are:

- decreased load of mast foot – load spread over three points, allows for smaller mast section, decreasing weight
- increased strength of rig
- the loading of the mast, shrouds and mast foot is decreased
- allows for a large leach in mainsail

The B&R 23 sports a 5 ft rotating bowsprit which allows the asymmetrical spinnakerto be rotated laterally 30 degrees to windward, to avoid blanketing by the jib when sailing deeper angles. It also features a system with two trapezes to maximize the righting moment that the crew can assert on the boat to keep it level. The retractable keel is operated with a tackle attached to the mast.

The most recently built boat is equipped with a deeper and heavier keel (for even better upwind performance) and a carbon fiber mast (to lower center of gravity). The first generation of boats can be retrofitted with these improvements.

== Characteristics ==
The B&R 23 is constructed to be highly responsive to changing sailing conditions. It is able to plane upwind in favorable conditions but is most efficient sailing downwind. Being an apparent wind sailboat, it usually gybes when sailing downwind at a TWA of around 150 degrees, ensuring that the AWA stays ahead of the beam. In most cases, the boat will move faster than the wind itself, even up to twice as fast.

As soon as the wind exceeds light breeze, the boat must be steered for balance by agile crew work and tiller work by the helmsman. It is not possible to 'force' the boat doing anything it doesn't want to. In a moderate breeze, under downwind, there must always be room to bear off – should a gust suddenly hit, the only option to keep the boat from capsizing is to bear off. This makes overtaking close to windward of another boat interesting.

The very large sail area demands constant control of the power generated by the sails. As soon as the breeze increases, wind must be spilled to maintain balance. The B&R 23 is kept upright and steered not only by rudder, but by the combination of TWA, balancing, sail trim as well as rudder.

The performance of the boat is exceptional as attested by the Life on the Layline Action Index. The B&R 23 scores very high, close to the most extreme multihulls.
