= Hobie Magic 25 =

Sportsboat

The Hobie Magic 25 is a trailable, strict one-design monohull sportsboat that was manufactured by the Hobie Cat Company (USA), Bashford Boatbuilder (Australia) and Lidgard Boatbuilder (New Zealand) for racing and day sailing in the late 1990s.

== Structure ==
The Hobie Magic 25 is currently out of production with about 75 boats in total being built, with the majority produced by Bashford Boatbuilder in Nowra, Australia.

== Design ==
Designed for Hobie by Australian designer Iain Murray and Associates.

The Magic 25 has a fractional rig. It utilizes a full carbon rig, triple trapeze, gennaker, retractable bowsprit, aluminium fin keel with a torpedo bulb, hydraulic mast ram and a powerful sail plan.

== Construction ==
Construction is mid-tech, employing vinylester and polyester resin over an E-glass and quadraxial lay-up, with 15mm Divincell foam core and carbon reinforcement.

The mast was manufactured using pre-impregnated carbon fibre in a one piece mould. The bowsprit and tiller were also carbon fibre.

The Spinnaker is 48.4 sqm.

== Specifications ==
LOA	7.46 m (24 ft 6 in)
LWL	7.265 m (23 ft 10.0 in)
Beam	2.31 m (7 ft 7 in)
Draft:	1.675m (5”6”)
Displacement:	845 kg (1,863 lb)
Balast:	390 kg (860 lb)
Sail area	36 m^{2} (390 sq ft)
Racing Crew	4

Magic 25 Drawing

== Class Associations ==
The Magic 25 had strong class racing and associations in Australia, New Zealand and Hong Kong. As of 2023/4, Hong Kong and New Zealand have active Magic 25 fleet & class racing.

== Sources ==
- Sailboat Data Magic 25
- Sailboat Guide Magic 25
- Sailing Magazine
- 48 North
