= Daihatsu Mira e:S =

Kei car produced by Daihatsu

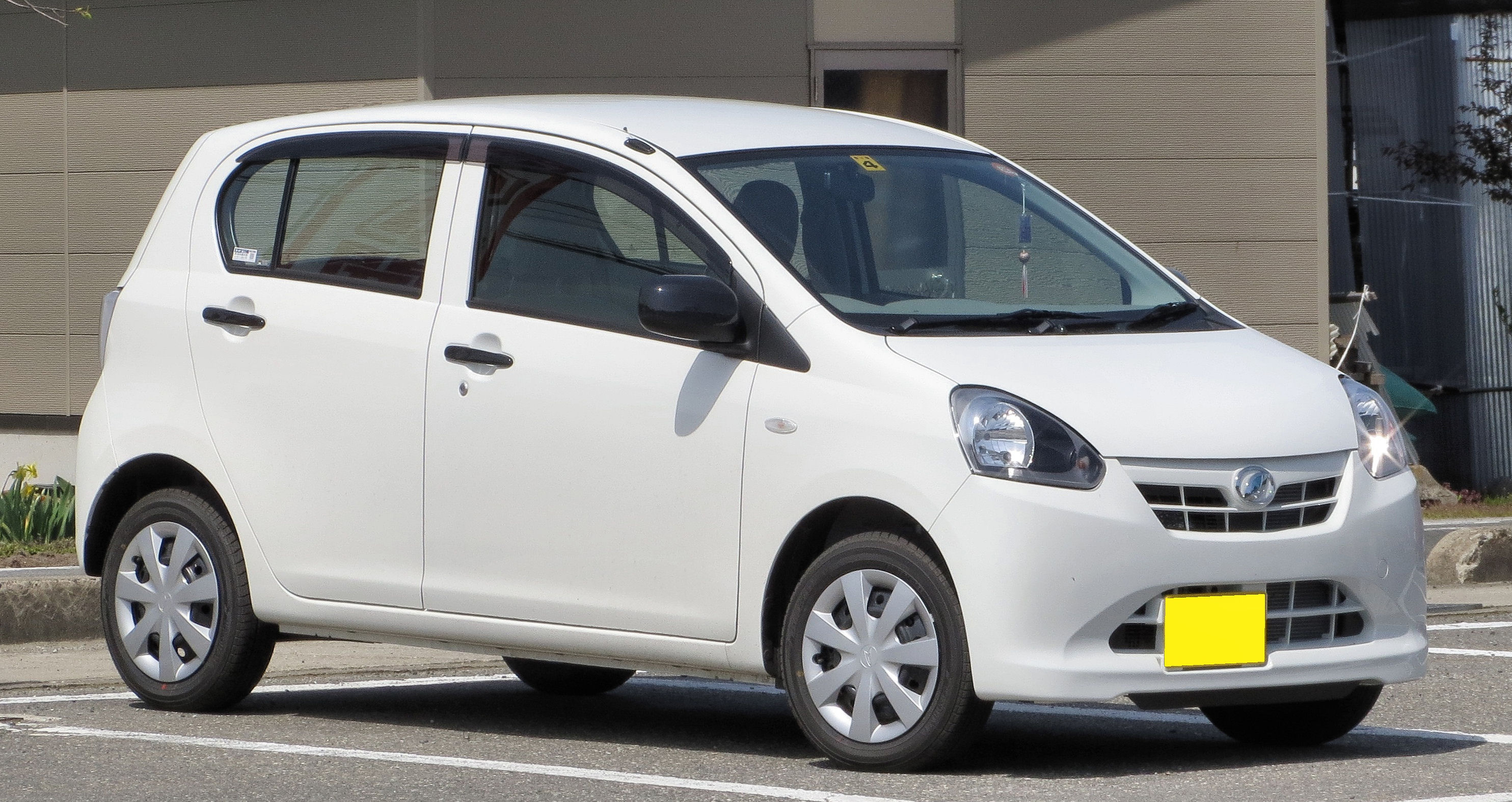
- Daihatsu Mira e:S Lf 4WD (LA310S)

Overview
- Manufacturer: Daihatsu
- Also called: Toyota Pixis Epoch; Subaru Pleo Plus
- Production: September 2011 – present
- Assembly: Japan: Nakatsu, Ōita (Daihatsu Motor Kyushu)

Body and chassis
- Class: Kei car
- Body style: 5-door hatchback/van
- Layout: Front-engine, front-wheel-drive; Front-engine, four-wheel-drive

Chronology
- Predecessor: Daihatsu Mira; Daihatsu Esse; Subaru Pleo (Pleo Plus)

The Daihatsu Mira e:S (Japanese: ダイハツ・ミライース, Hepburn: Daihatsu Mira Īsu) is a kei car manufactured by the Japanese automaker Daihatsu as the successor to the original Mira. It was previewed by the "e:S" concept car at the 2009 Tokyo Motor Show. The car was introduced to the Japanese market in September 2011. It was also sold by Toyota as the Toyota Pixis Epoch (Japanese: トヨタ・ピクシスエポック, Hepburn: Toyota Pikushisu Epokku), which was released on 10 May 2012 and by Subaru as the Subaru Pleo Plus (Japanese: スバル・プレオプラス, Hepburn: Subaru Pureo Purasu), which was released on 21 December 2012.

The moniker "e:S" stands for "Eco (Ecology, Economy) and Smart".

== Overview ==
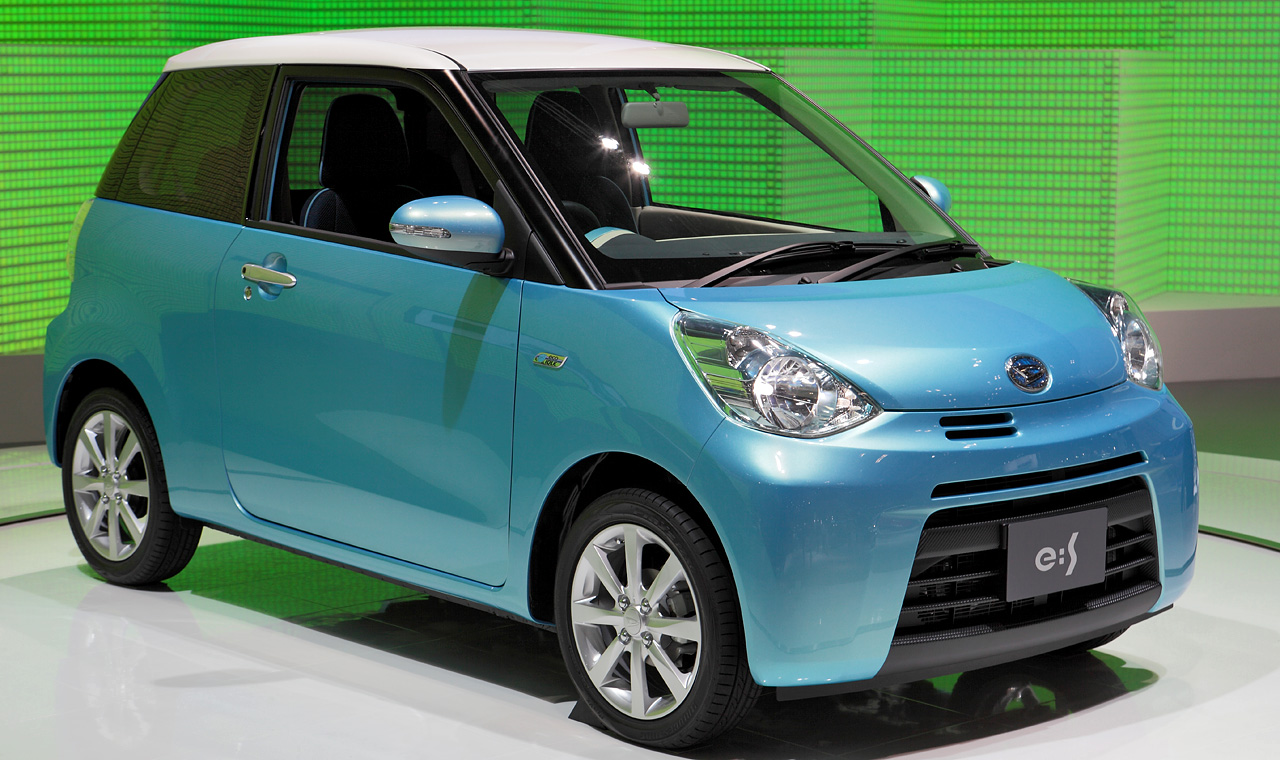

The e:S concept car at the 2009 Tokyo Motor Show

In response to the recent rise in environmental awareness and low priced cars, the Mira e:S has been developed with the concept of "the third eco car". It is the mass production version of the "e:S" concept car.

The existing technology owned by Daihatsu was reviewed, and by using the "e:S technology", the fuel efficiency has been improved by 40% compared to the conventional engine by reducing the weight of the vehicle, improving the transmission, improving the engine, among others.

The engine improves combustion efficiency by improving the compression ratio and the injector spray atomisation, etc., and by using the "i-EGR system", the mechanical loss is reduced to the utmost by making improvements over details. Furthermore, by adopting cooperative control by the electronic throttle, the most efficient state is maintained according to the driving situation. The CVT also reduces emissions by increasing the efficiency of the oil pump and improves the power transmission efficiency by lowering the CVT control pressure. As a result, the engine load was also reduced by optimising the transmission gear ratio (high gearing).

The body is made streamlined while maintaining the safety and a comfortable ride. The weight reduction has been made to the interior parts such as thinning of resin parts such as instrument panels, seat frame and CVT for idling stop. The air resistance has been suppressed by improving the shape of the front corners and reducing the flow velocity under the floor, and the rolling resistance was also reduced by improving the aforementioned weight reduction, bearings and brakes.

The "Eco Idle" idling stop mechanism that is installed in some grades of the Move and Move Conte is also equipped as standard for all vehicles, but the system in Mira e:S is the world's first for CVT vehicles with petrol engines. By applying the brakes and automatically stopping the engine when the speed is 7 km/h (4.3 mph) or less, the fuel consumption is improved by increasing the idling stop time. In addition, by reducing the number of dedicated parts, it has achieved weight reduction and "compactification".

With these technologies, JC08 mode fuel consumption achieved a fuel consumption of 30 km/L (85 mpg_{‑imp}; 71 mpg_{‑US}) for front-wheel drive models and 27 km/L (76 mpg_{‑imp}; 64 mpg_{‑US}) for four-wheel drive models.

The cost of the vehicle was reduced by reducing the number of parts and reducing the weight of the vehicle by approximately 60 kg (132 lb) by reviewing the component layout, shape, material selection and specifications.

The Mira e:S is assembled at Daihatsu Motor Kyushu in Nakatsu, Ōita.

== First generation (LA300; 2011) ==
First generation (LA300)
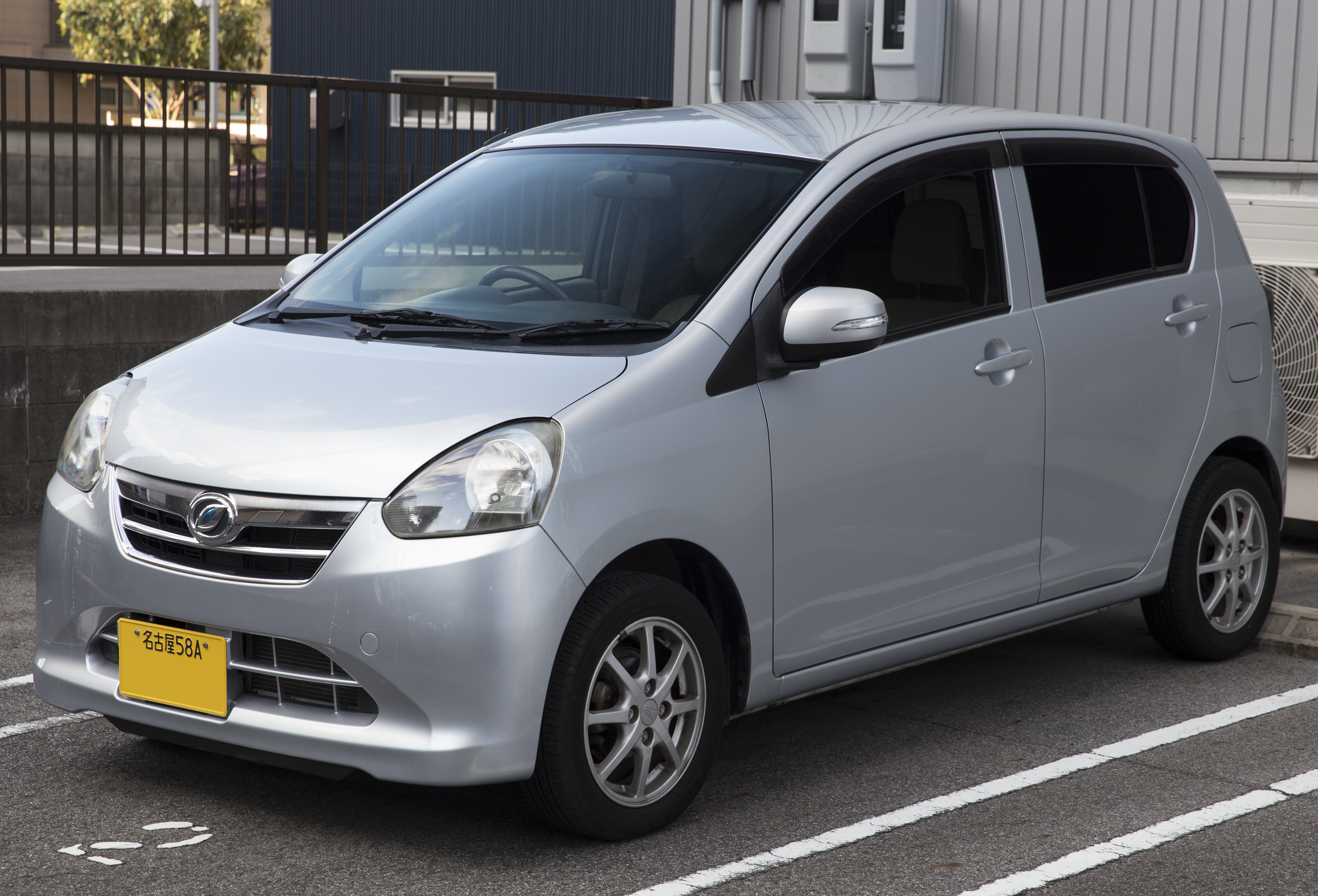
- 2012 Mira e:S G (LA300S, pre-facelift)

Overview
- Production: September 2011 – May 2017

Body and chassis
- Related: Daihatsu Move (LA100)

Powertrain
- Engine: Petrol: 658 cc KF-VE I3
- Power output: 49–52 PS (36–38 kW)
- Transmission: CVT

Dimensions
- Wheelbase: 2,455 mm (96.7 in)
- Length: 3,395 mm (133.7 in)
- Width: 1,475 mm (58.1 in)
- Height: 1,500 mm (59.1 in)
- Kerb weight: 730–790 kg (1,609–1,742 lb)

The first-generation Mira e:S was released on 20 September 2011. At the time of its introduction, it won the Good Design Award on 3 October 2011. The Toyota Pixis Epoch OEM rebadging went on sale in May 2012. Then in December of the same year, the Subaru Pleo Plus was launched.

Both the Mira e:S, Pixis Epoch and Pleo Plus received a facelift on 19 August 2013. The engine of the original version produces 52 PS (38 kW) at 6,800 rpm; this dropped to 49 PS (36 kW) at the same engine speed when the engine was revised for better fuel economy in July 2014. The new engine runs on the Atkinson cycle and has an even higher compression ratio of 12.2 to 1, vis-à-vis the earlier 11.3 to 1.

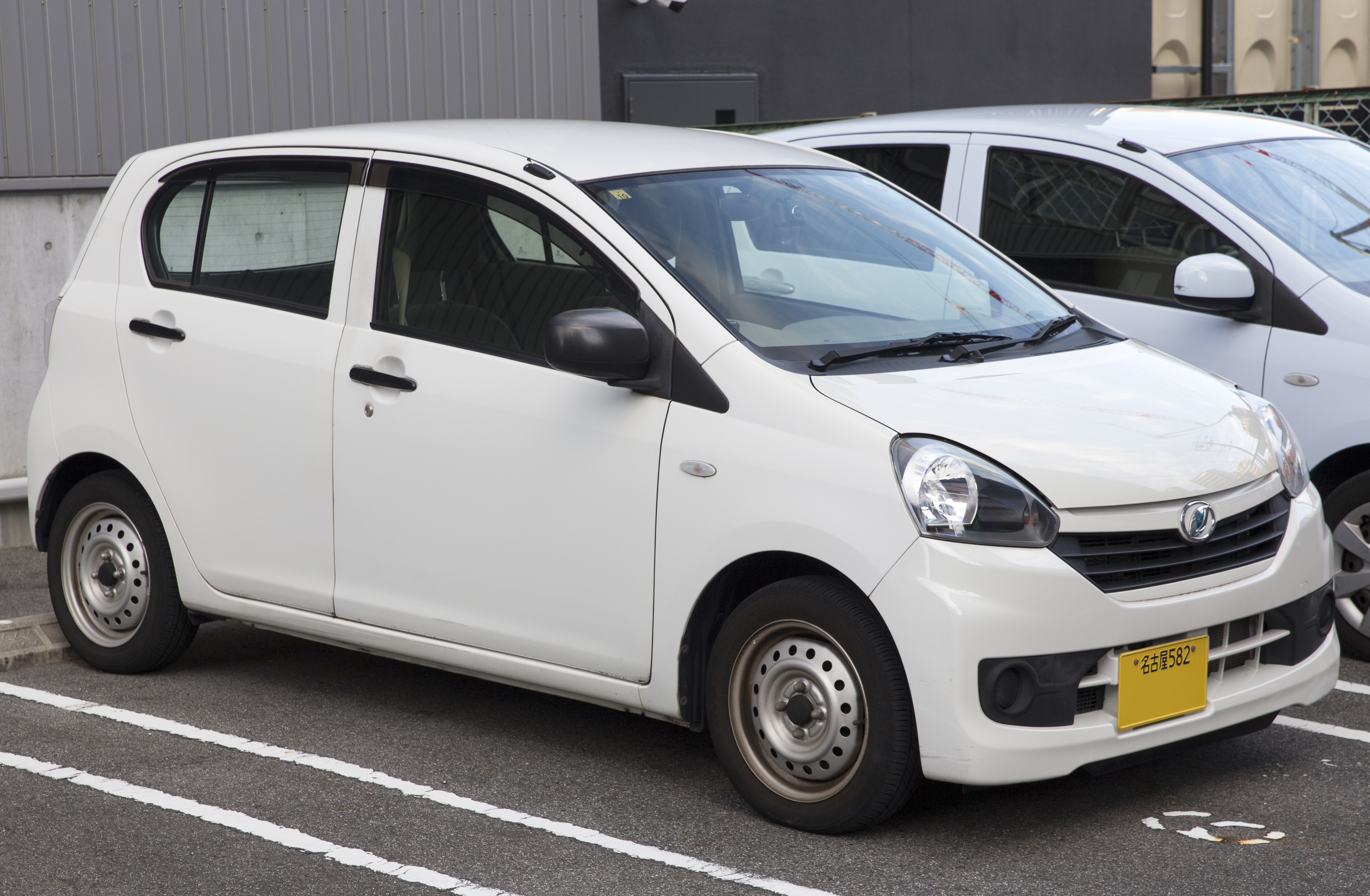
2016 Mira e:S D (LA300S, facelift)

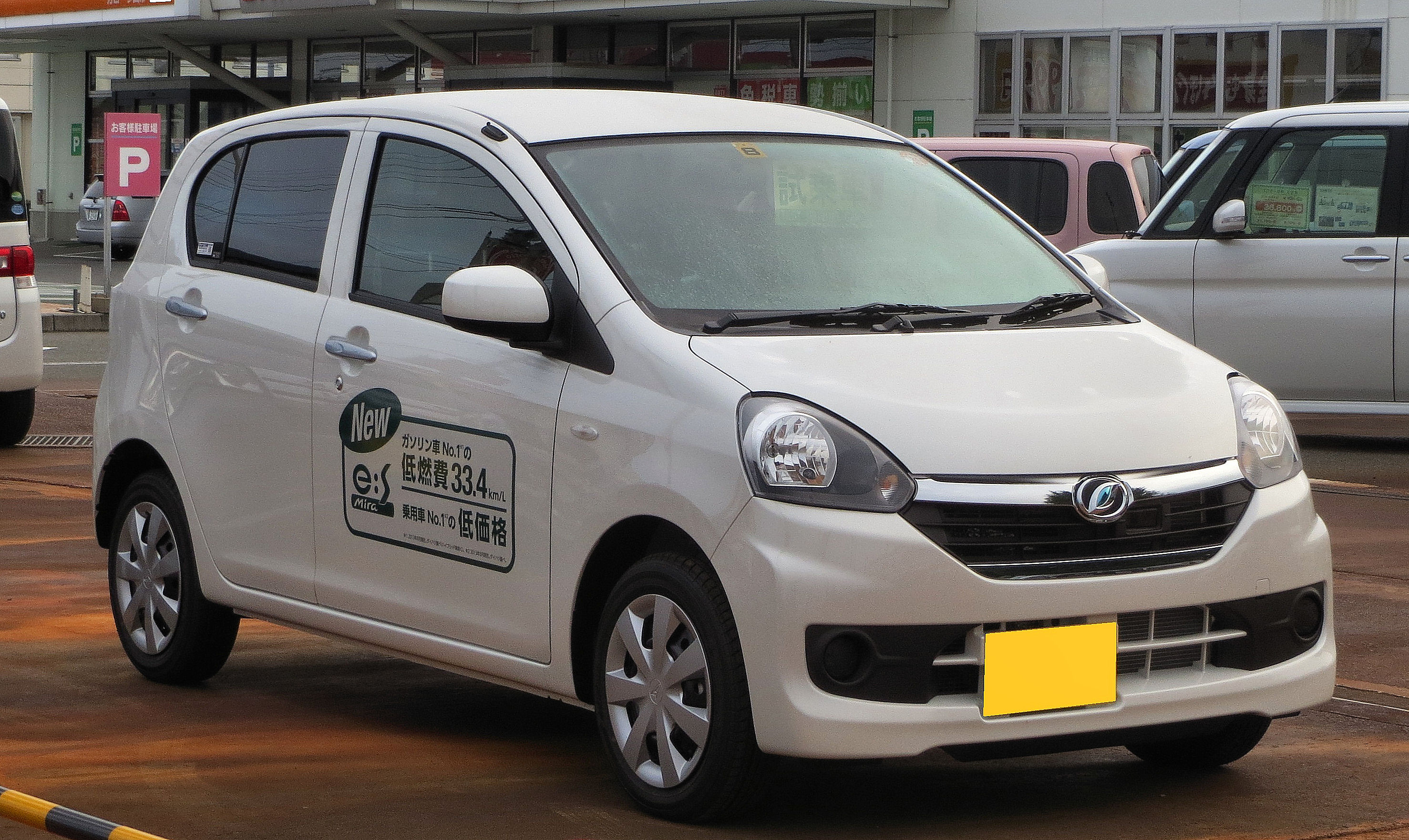
Mira e:S Xf SA 4WD (LA310S, facelift)

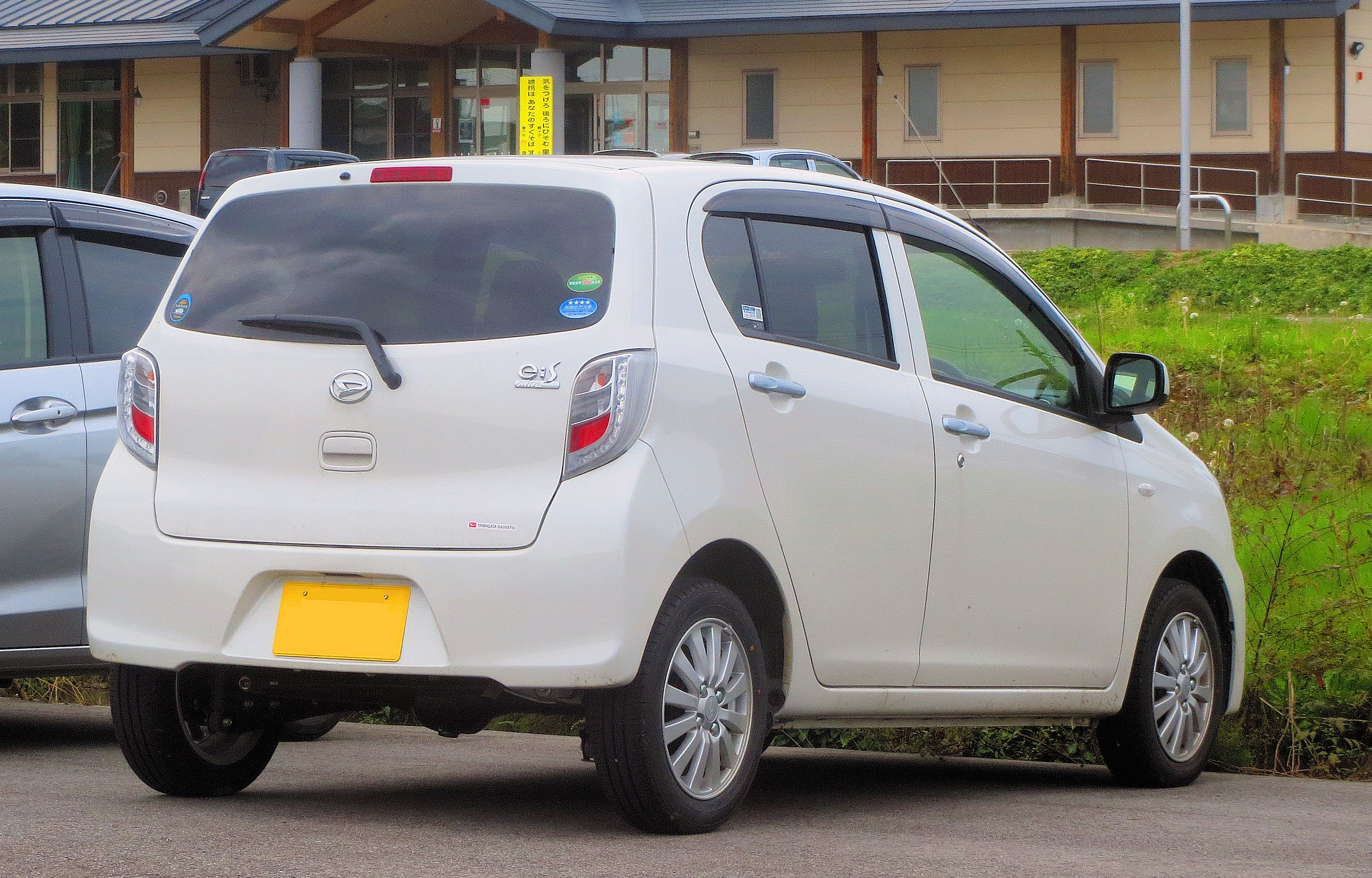
Mira e:S Xf Limited SA 4WD (LA310S)

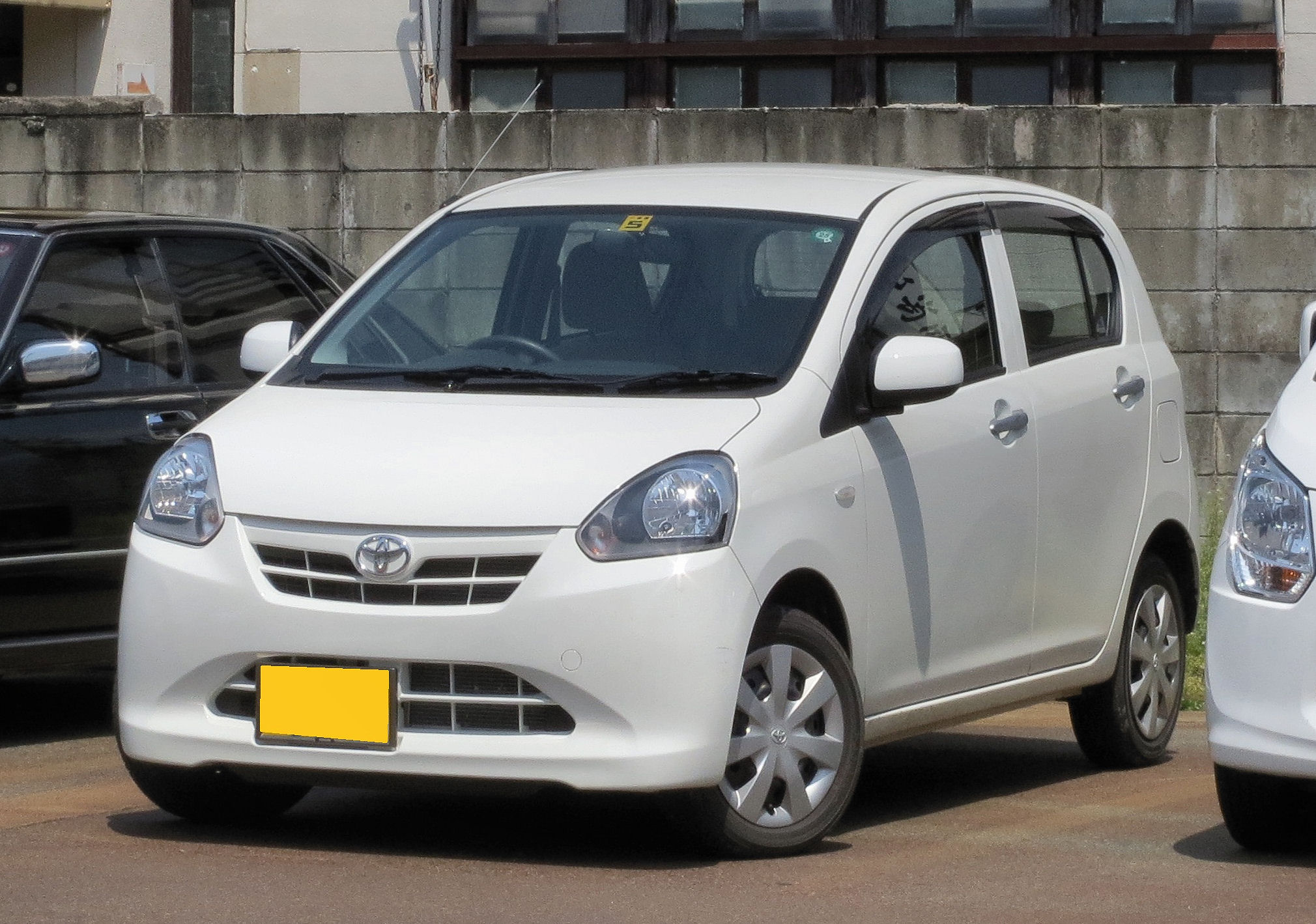
Toyota Pixis Epoch (LA300A, pre-facelift)

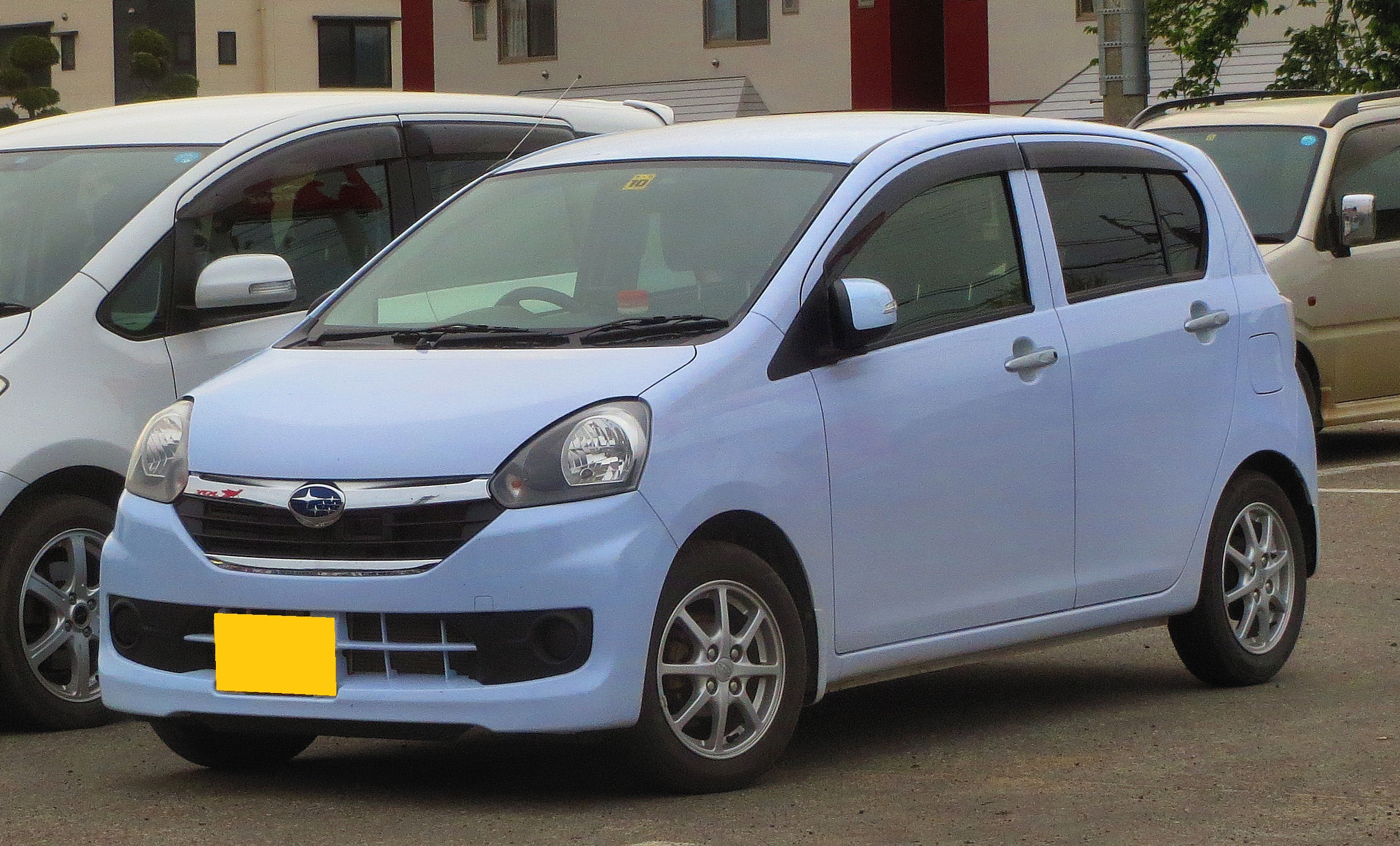
Subaru Pleo Plus G SA (LA300F, facelift)

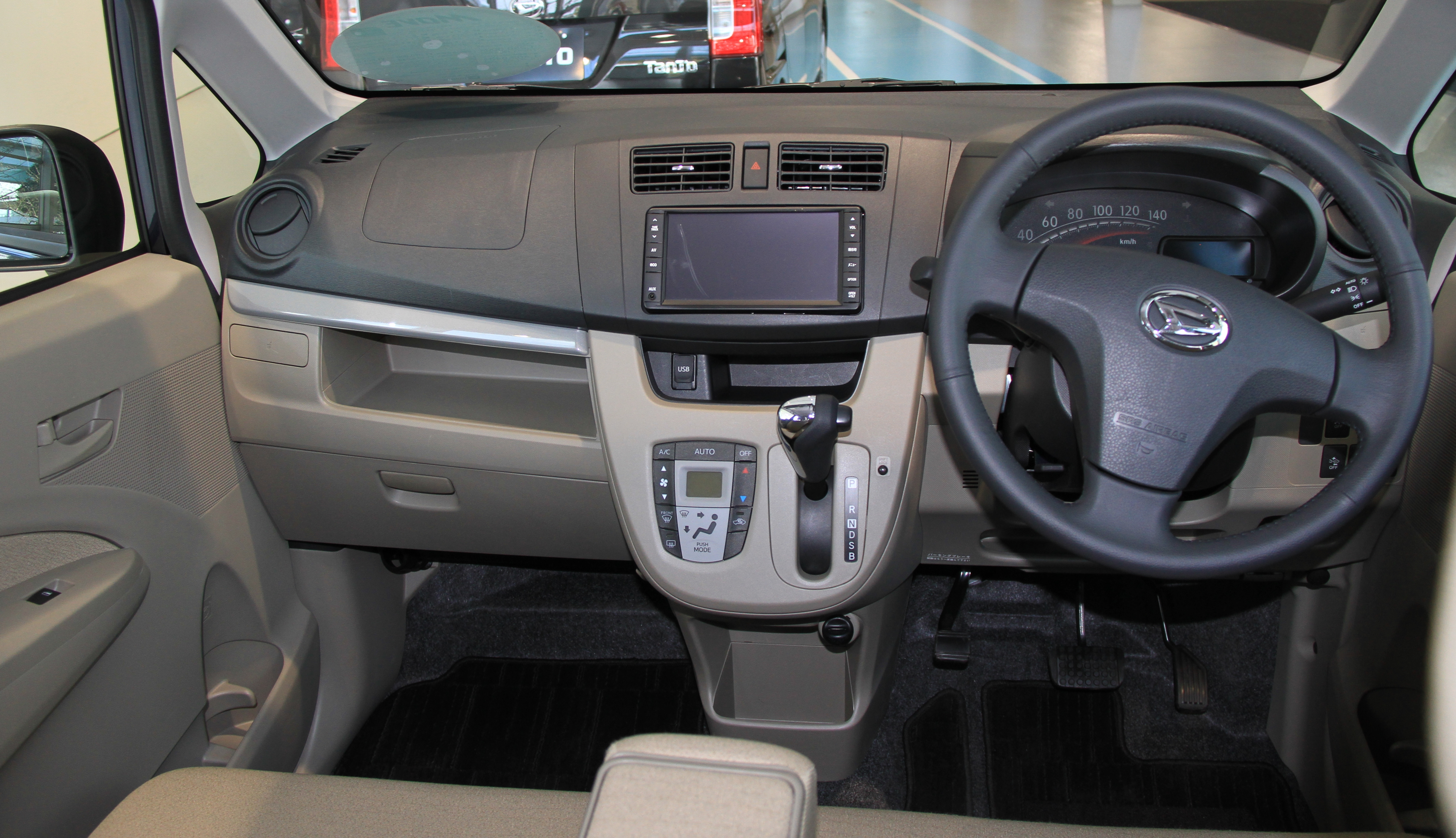
Interior

== Second generation (LA350; 2017) ==
Second generation (LA350)
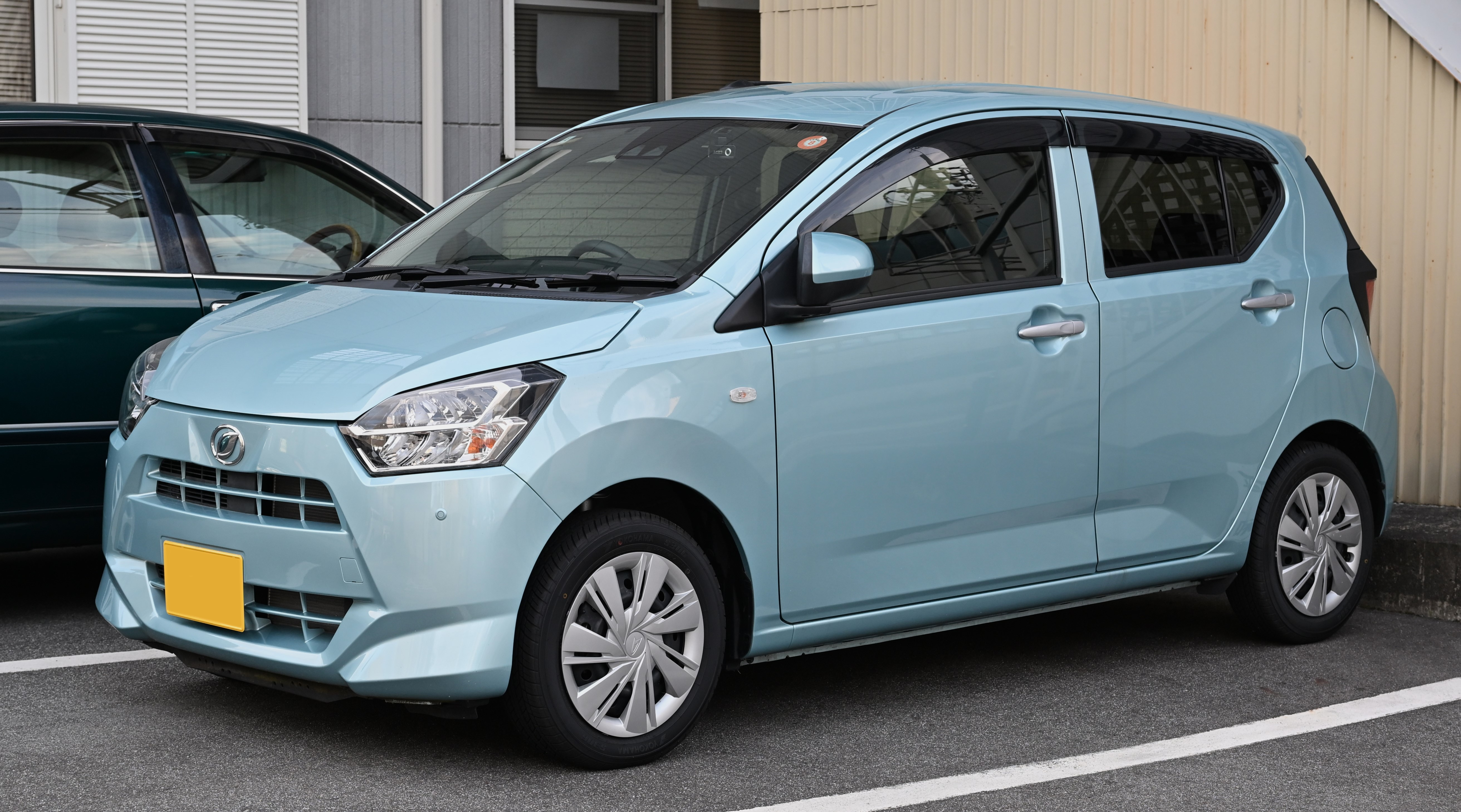
- Mira e:S X (LA350S)

Overview
- Production: May 2017 – present

Body and chassis
- Related: Daihatsu Mira Tocot; Daihatsu Move (LA150)

Powertrain
- Engine: Petrol: 658 cc KF-VE I3
- Power output: 36 kW (48 hp; 49 PS)
- Transmission: CVT

Dimensions
- Wheelbase: 2,455 mm (96.7 in)
- Length: 3,395 mm (133.7 in)
- Width: 1,475 mm (58.1 in)
- Height: 1,500–1,510 mm (59.1–59.4 in)
- Kerb weight: 650–740 kg (1,433–1,631 lb)

The second-generation Mira e:S was released on 9 May 2017, alongside the second-generation Pixis Epoch and Pleo Plus. The engine was the same, Atkinson cycle three-cylinder with 49 PS (36 kW) as used in the previous generation since 2014. Thanks to significant weight reduction, fuel economy increased marginally, from 34.2 to 35.2 km/L (2.92 to 2.84 L/100 km; 80 to 83 mpg_{‑US}) for the lightest, two-wheel drive models. Some of the better equipped models, such as the X and G and their derivatives, are fitted with jewelled, multifaceted LED headlamps.

The Mira Van from the previous generation was discontinued, with Daihatsu opting to no longer market a van derivative of their kei hatchback. Instead, the low-priced B ("Business") model was available. The B model has plain steel wheels and other money saving reductions such as a sticker replacing the chrome badge on the rear and fixed rear side windows; it was also revised to provide a flat loading floor with the rear seat folded down.

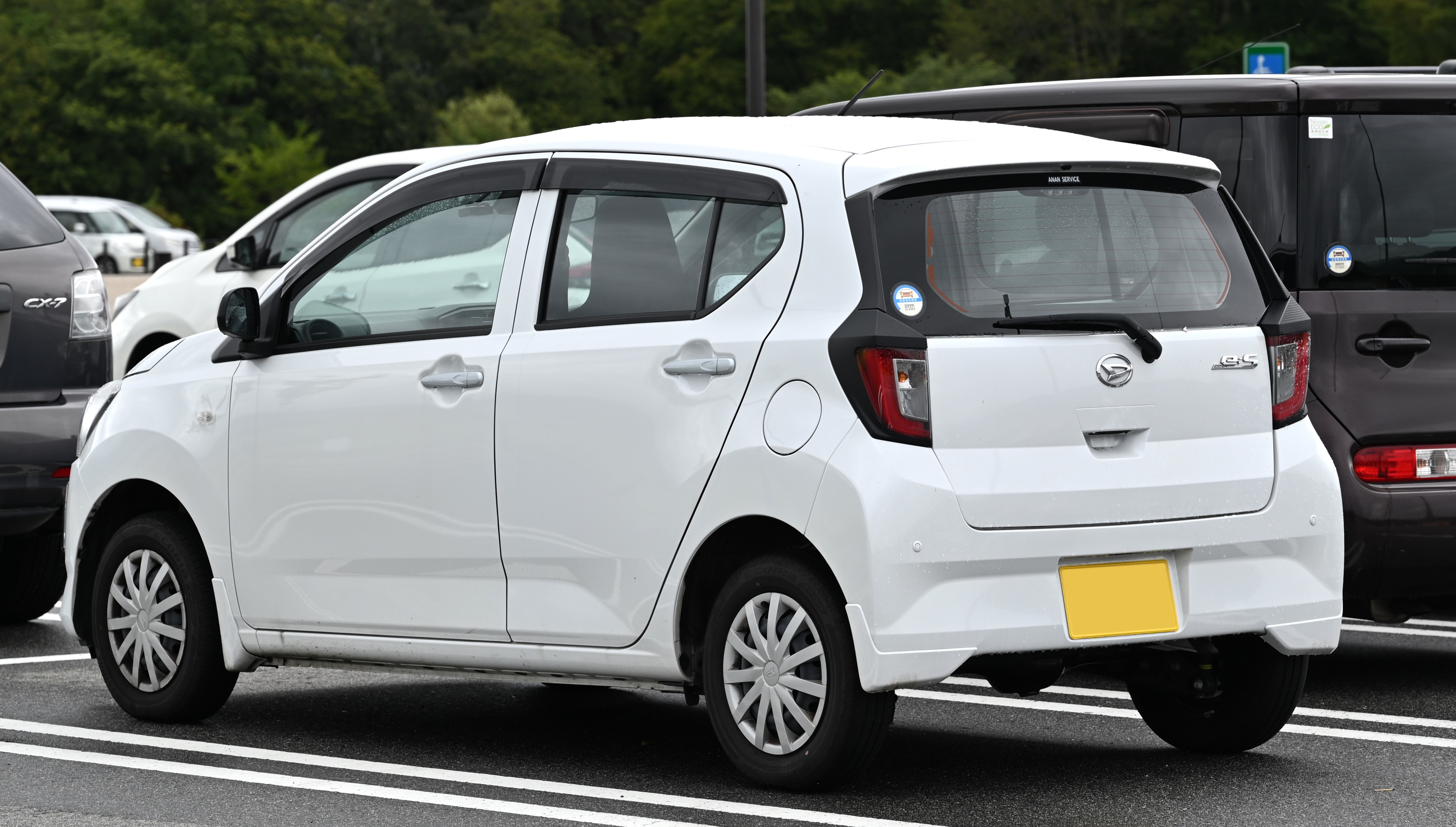
Mira e:S L (LA350S)

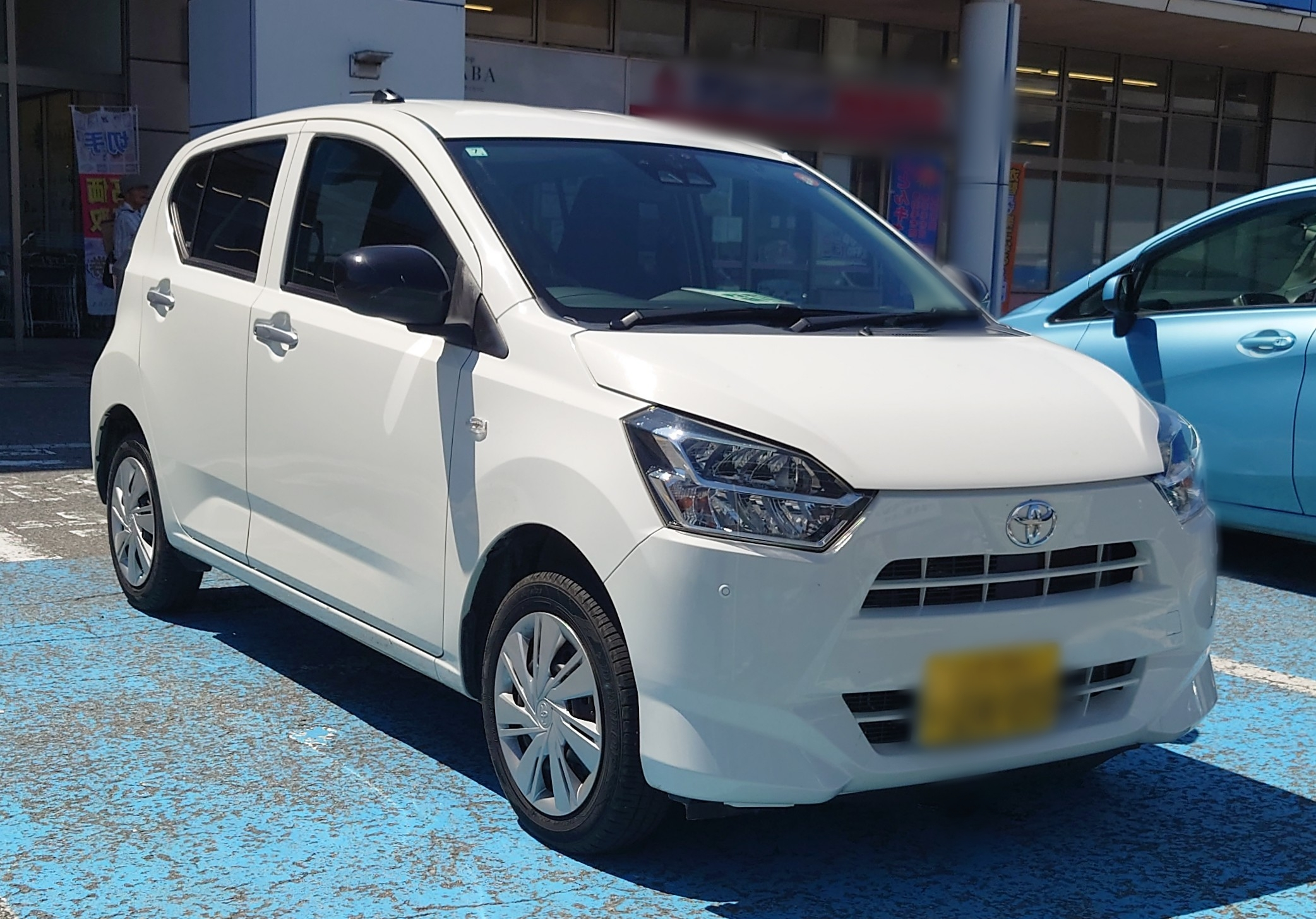
Toyota Pixis Epoch X 4WD (LA360A)

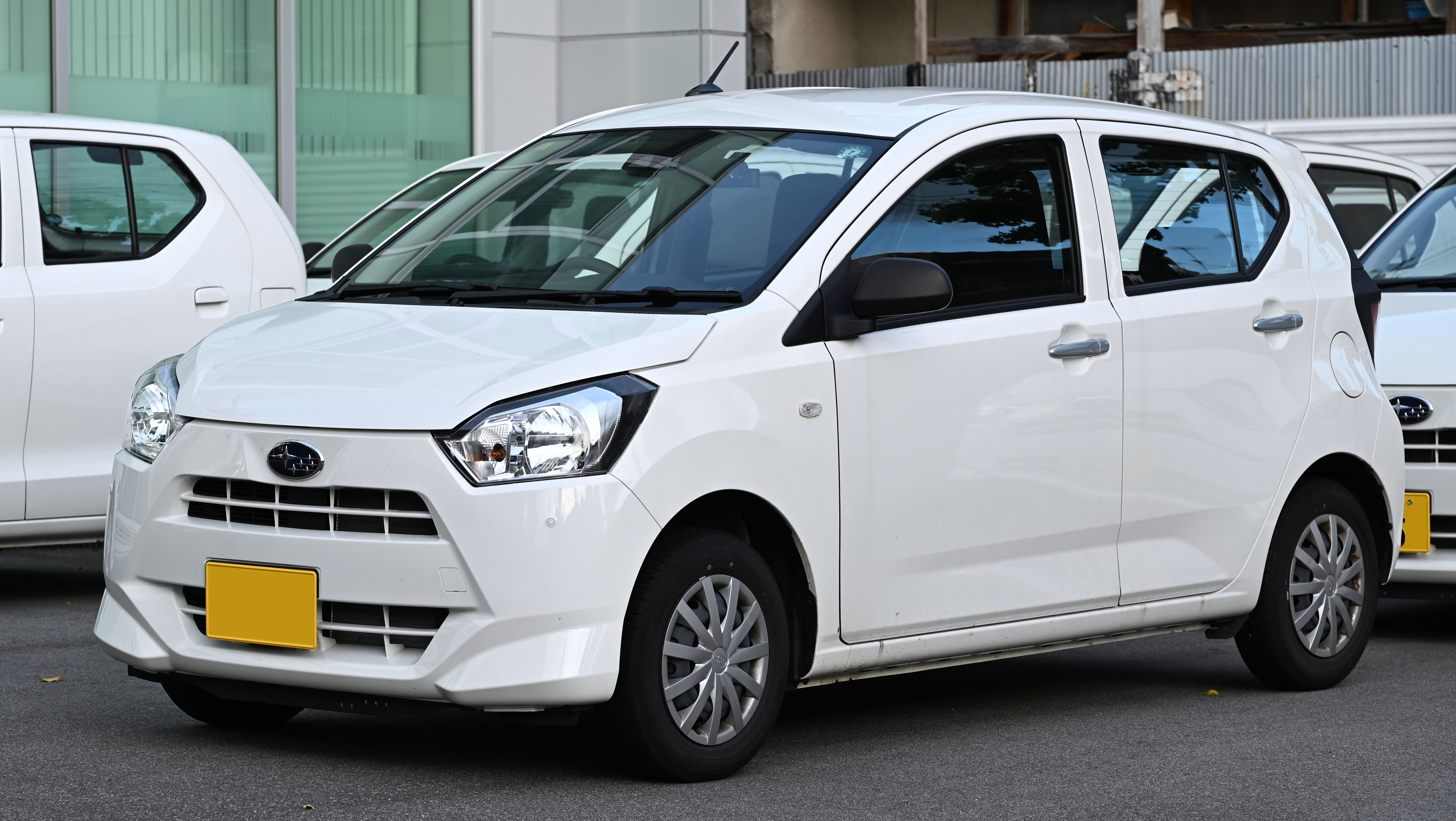
Subaru Pleo Plus F (LA350F)

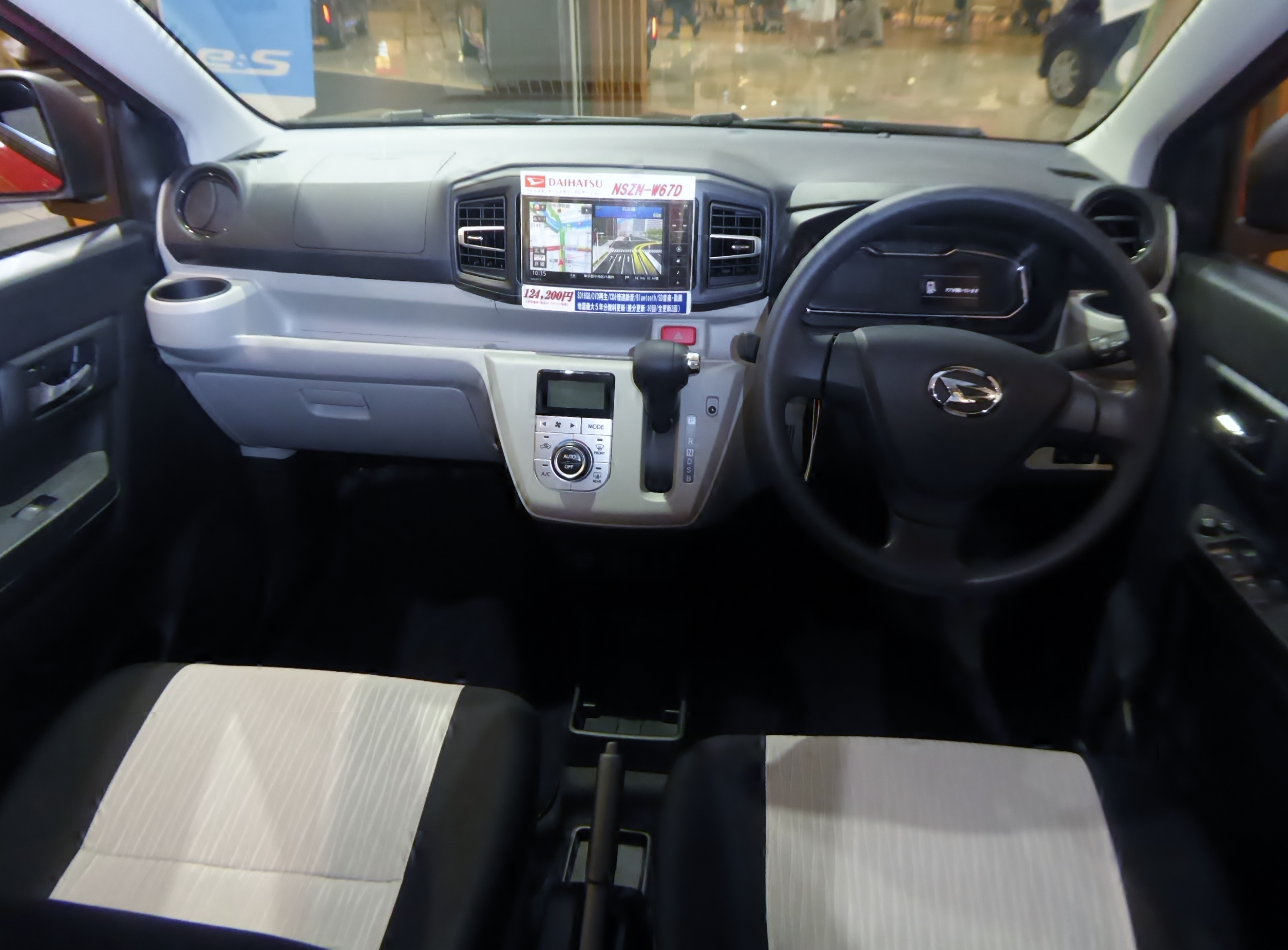
Interior
