= Sportsboat =

Poorly defined sailboat type

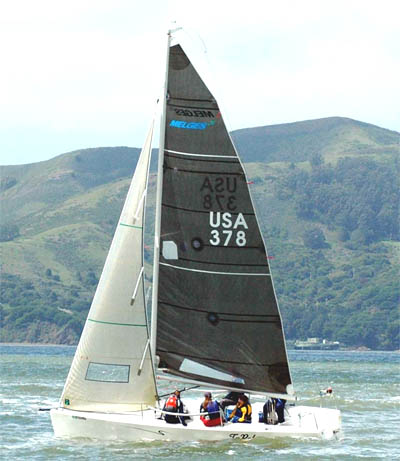
Melges 24

The term sportsboat first appeared in the late 1980s and early 1990s to describe trailer sailers that were optimised for high performance at the expense of accommodation and ballast. The very definition of the term "sportsboat" is evolving. (Note: The term sportsboat has also been applied to small motorboats. The motorized small sportsboat is a fair weather boat which can be trailered in and is well adapted to towing a water skier. This includes certain classes of boats that compete on a closed course on inland water.)

There is an absence of an accepted definition of the term. (Note: "Internationally, in the last ten years, yachting has generally declined in terms of the numbers of boats being raced. This trend, however, has been bucked by the ever increasing number of sport yachts being built and raced world -wide. Why is that? ... for the purpose of this feature, let's define a sport boat. The main feature is, as the name implies, a sporty racing yacht. ... road trailerable. They don't fit any rule and there doesn't seem to be an international consensus to define them, [and they are evolving.] ... These boats were all performance orientated, fun to sail and fast. The biggest difference these boats displayed compared to their trailer sailor predecessors, was that they tended to plane downwind. ... The reduction in weight is not the only answer used to justify the cost of a carbon rig, because with them, we can power the boat up so that it's fully loaded in 8 knots of air. There are two developments that have advanced the sport boat cause over the past few years: exotic construction materials and asymmetric spinnakers. Both have had a big influence in the evolution of these boats.")

They tend to be characterised by historically large sail areas for a given length (especially under downwind sails), light weight construction and a heavy reliance on crew weight to counterbalance heeling forces. They usually feature lifting keels (for easy trailerability) of a modern fin and bulb design and planing hull designs. Most sportsboats are self-righting as opposed to skiffs.

As similar design philosophies spread into larger classes the length of most sportsboats has come to be considered as between 5.5m and 8m (18'-26'). Boats of a similar design but of larger size have come to be known as sports yachts and are generally in the size range of 9m - 12m.

Their noncomformity with traditional designs and concepts — and their heterogeneity — has made problematical their placement into racing, outside of one design races. Creating handicap systems that match actual sportsboat performance has necessitated new Racing Rules of Sailing and measures. The Australian Measurement System was updated in 2012 with the launch of AMS2 and this has been very successful in updating the mathematics to accommodate modern [traditional] designs. Particularly because of their planing performance (which varies from the hydrodynamics and hull speed (Note: See Froude number.) of a displacement hull), the Sportsboat Measurement System was specially created to fit the needs of boats within the category. (Note: "With new technology and innovative designs, it is impossible to remove all of the inequities on a permanent basis, so the system will now be updated on a 4 year cycle ... The Sportsboat Measurement System (SMS) was introduced in 2008 and during the years has grown substantially. It is now being adopted in a number of other countries and includes many different classes that fit the definitions of a sportsboat.")

== Rig design and sail plan ==
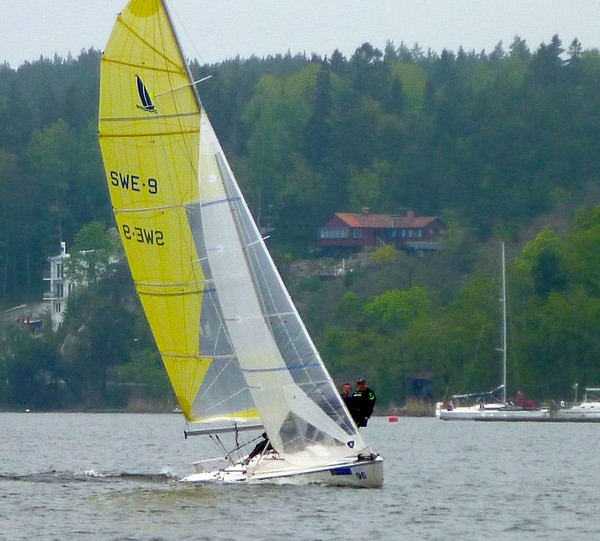
B&R 23

Sportboats are generally characterised by a tall mast for their hull length, a correspondingly large main sail and non-overlapping jib (a headsail that does not extend rearward past the mast). (Note: A sport boat "is a powerful ultra-light boat with oodles of sail area that has been designed with the sole purpose of competing in round-the-cans events. ... little or no accommodation with sail and gear stowage [occupying] interior volume. They have a high ballast to weight ratio ... [extreme] sailing displacement to length ratios are 105 or less, and the sail area to displacement ratios are over 30 (upwind) and 65 (downwind). Sail area to wetted surface ... considered pretty slippery. Whether these boats fly asymmetric chutes from sprits, or symmetrics from a convention pole is irrelevant.”)

Many sportsboat designs feature asymmetric spinnakers and, like skiffs, they are often sailed downwind by sailing a series of broad reaches in a shallower zig-zag pattern than with traditional symmetrical spinnakers.

As with the large mainsails, spinnakers are also generally much larger for a given hull size than had previously been used. Many sportsboats are fitted with an extendible bowsprit of 4–8 feet (1.2-2.5m) length, which moves the tack of the spinnaker away forward from the hull and allows better airflow and a larger sail size.

Some like the larger Thompsons and Phuket 8 feature a bowsprit that is both extendable as well as articulating - able to move from side to side - which is a system first used by Greg Young in the Bull series of boats, enabling the asym boat to sail at deeper angles downwind as the pole is squared back. For lighter smaller sportboats such as the Shaws, Vipers and wider French boats, the downwind performance aims to get the boats planing as early as possible, and thus the weight saved from using a simple extendable prod only is considered more valuable than the gains from articulation.

== Hull design ==
Sportboat hulls have many elements in common with skiffs such as an almost flat bottom, a fine bow and a flat aft section - in short, a planing hull form.

This low-drag shape, combined with the rig and sail design and the lightweight construction of most sports boats, is what gives them their speed advantage over traditional designs.

To offset the large sail area and the resulting significant heeling momentum there are 3 main design philosophies: 1. a deep and heavy keel; 2. a way to get the crew further off the centreline by using wings, racks, hiking aids or trapezes; and, 3. a reduction in sail area, leading to a reduction in displacement, leading to less need for sail area and thus a reduction in heeling momentum. Many modern sportsboats use some combination of 1&2 or 2&3 also, with option 1 tending to favour upwind legs, and option 3 tending to favour downwind; option 2 being an advantage in all respects except rating.

Most sports boats use the modern fin and bulb design, which may also be lifting for ease of storage, as most sportsboats are designed to be taken out of the water on a daily or regular basis.

== Accommodation ==
Most sportsboats have no or very little on-board accommodation as they are primarily intended to be sailed in short races around laid courses on sheltered waters. They are like track racing cars - intended only for use in races for limited durations. A typical club sportboat race would be between 2 and 3 hours long and the biggest regattas would usually feature 3-4 races a day, each of only 1 to 1.5 hours duration.

Cockpits are usually fully open and the only covered area is a very small and spartan fore-cabin (cuddy), usually used only for storing sails and essential safety equipment. Even larger sports yachts which often do have a proper cabin below are often missing all the usual features of a yacht. Sinks, toilets, bunks, water tanks and cooking equipment are usually missing. Often a moulded hard plastic seat on either side of the cuddy and a removable chemical toilet are the only amenities.

A number of trailer sailers in the past have attempted to use sportboat like design and construction while retaining the interior cabin volume and amenities; most have ended up being quicker than trailer sailers only due to their stripped out interiors (compared to their competitors with toilets, cookers, cushions, etc.) and have been not competitive against true sportboats. In the larger sizes, there have been a number of sportboats that have managed to achieve both accommodation as well as performance, including the Young Rocket, Stealth designs from Alan Carwadine and various Elliott configurations.

== Sportsboat-specific handicapping systems ==
Sportsboats at first raced in existing class divisions under existing handicapping systems. As the number of sportsboats continued to grow specific divisions for them have become increasingly common at all levels of racing. In Europe and the USA, the trend has been more for One Design racing where all boats are identical.

Rules currently used to rate sportsboats include sportsboat rule SBR which will be discontinued at the end of 2010, and individual country rule systems such as the New Zealand Sportsboat box rule and Australian SMS system. Some boats uses trapezes, racks and wings to increase performance. Heavier designs such as the SB3, J80, Flying Tiger and Platu are competitive in handicap racing, but are significantly slower compared to the lightweight racers.

== Sportsboat developments worldwide ==
=== European sportsboats ===
While asymmetric sportsboats had been available for some years (Cork 1720, Bull 7000, Melges 32) sailing in handicap events, the launch of the Tony Castro designed Laser SB3(Dart SB3 in Australia) in 2002 made a huge difference to take-up of sportsboat sailing.

The SB3 is one of the most popular sportboats of the modern era with over 600 sold worldwide (mainly in Europe) and it has been the largest class at the annual Cowes Week regatta with over 80 boats. The SB3 widened the appeal of sportsboats by preventing hiking and having a heavier keel providing more stability - making it suitable for a wider range of sailors and over 100 boats attend the annual class regatta which will be held in the UK in 2011 and Australia in 2012. The manufacturers also marketed the boat by putting top Olympic sailors into regattas and by aggressive pricing into some markets (e.g. Ireland) for early adopters - as well as holding an annual race between the class winners at Cowes Week.

French sportboats generally sail in handicap events and tend to be similar to the open 60s and open 70s shape; with very wide bodies, rotating rigs, non masthead kites and masts set well back. Examples include the Open 5.70, Open 6.50 and the more recent Karver 650; all of which have twin rudders and many of the other typical features of the larger shorthanded and ocean racer design formats.

The Uffa Fox designed Flying Fifteen from 1947 meets most of the criteria used to define a Sportsboat here. Sailed extensively in the UK and Australia, fleets also exist in Belgium, France, Hong Kong, New Zealand, South Africa, and Spain (Majorca).

=== Australia/NZ sportboats ===
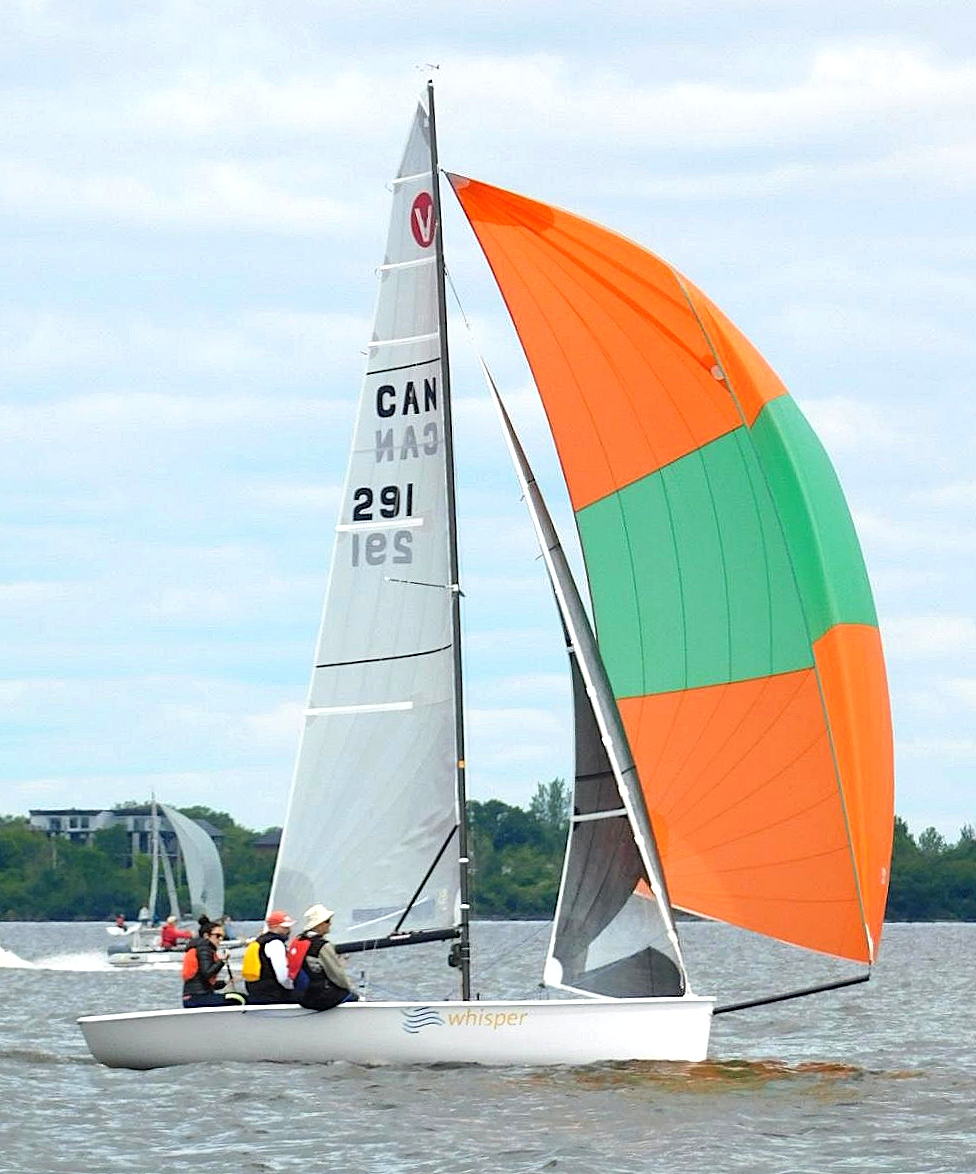
Viper 640 flying its spinnaker

Popular boat designs in Australia include the Melges 24, J/70, Viper 640, Esse 850, Elliott 7, Shaw 650 and Hobie Magic 25. More recently, New Zealand and Australian designs have become increasingly popular including various designs by Thompson, the Phuket 8 by Duncanson and a variety of boats by Shaw Yacht design.

The Racetrack website has kept relative performance data between a variety of Australian and New Zealand sportboats, in order to assess comparative performance. To date, the fastest sportboats have tended to be the lightest, least ballasted, widest boats, with the Rob Shaw designed 7 and 7.5m designs being the fastest in New Zealand, and the largest 8m Allan Carawadine and Bethwaite designs proving fastest in Australia.

The Australian Sports Boat Association is now the body that represents sportboat sailing in Australia. The Association is fully affiliated with Australian Sailing and aims to regulate and promote the racing of sports boats at regattas throughout Australia.

ASBA, incorporated in 2007, was founded by sports boats sailors Cameron Rae, Mark Roberts and Richard Parkes. The trio wanted to see a more scientific approach taken to handicapping the various designs racing together. Prior to the formation of ASBA handicaps were considered to be a bit of a lottery. Membership continues to grow with members in every state of Australia. The Association represents a myriad of sports boats including Thompson 7s, 750s and 8s, Elliott 7s and 780s, Shaw 650s, Stealth 7s and 8s, Melges 24s, Hobie Magic 25s and a host of other sports boat designs. Using their own new rating system called SMS the Association is aiming to create a level playing field for multiple designs, and to encourage high performance designs without the excessive penalties currently existing in other rating systems.

=== USA sportsboats ===
The Melges 24, launched in 1993 has set the worldwide benchmark for what a modern Sportboat should be. Selling over 800 boats, half this fleet has ended up in the US. The popularity of this boat led to a flurry of designs although none matched the Melges 24 in numbers sold. Other classes designed at that time have endured such as the Ultimate 20 and the Viper 640. During the mid-2000s there has been a resurgence in sportsboats. The Viper 640 has been revived after the class died out and is now one of the fastest growing classes in the US. The Ultimate 20 had a makeover with the adoption of carbon masts. Melges has launched two new models the 32 and 20, both have become popular in international markets. The latest designs have come from the Viper designer Brian Bennett with the VX One and JBoats with their J70, as well as the Shaw 650 which is now also available in USA. Sales of sportsboats in the US are expected to expand due to rapid growth in recreational boating as observed in 2020. More than 310,000 new powerboats were sold in 2020, which is the greatest sales since before the Great Recession in 2008.

== Notable incident ==
During the 2011 Chicago Yacht Club Race to Mackinac, the high performance monohull sportsyacht Kiwi 35 WingNuts turtled in an extreme storm, killing the captain and one crew member. This was despite its having an experienced crew. Later inquiry said that the boat — specifically its high performance extremely wide low displacement hull — was unfit for the location, weather and the multiday and lengthy race, and urged race officials to change ratings and revoke privileges to enter the race. (Note: On the other hand, one meteorologist suggested: "Veteran Chicago-Mac racers have encountered similar conditions during previous races and understand that coping with severe weather is part of the challenge. Skippers must prepare their boats, train their crew, maintain a watchful eye for approaching storms and "the dearest friend (and most menacing foe) of all sailors -- the wind." Thornton, Mark A. (August 2011). "2011 Chicago-Mackinac Race: A Meteorological Summary".) The waves were not all that unusual, although the wind was. The boat may have buried one of its hiking wings into a wave, causing it to 'trip,' and had the other lifted by the wind. It is rare but not unheard of for keelboats to turtle and remain upside down, particularly if it has not lost its keel. However, this boat's unique hull form, which made it very fast, also rendered it more stable upside down than right side up. This was a recipe for the disaster. This loss was occasioned despite a competent and experienced crew which was as well equipped and prepared as thought to be necessary. WingNuts met then current offshore stability standards, which failed to adequately take into account the effect of the "radical" winged hull. (Note: "On paper, WingNuts met all stability requirements for the Chicago-Mac race. The race required that all boats have an Offshore Racing Rule (ORR) handicap measurement certificate, a document that includes two measures of stability: Limit of Positive Stability (LPS) and the Stability Index (SI). However, after the accident, the US Sailing panel found that the ORR formulas did not adequately penalize the Kiwi 35’s extreme flare, the difference between the waterline beam and the maximum beam. When the panel eliminated a fixed lower limit for the “capsize increment” — one of the factors used in the calculating stability index — WingNuts’ index of 100.7 plummeted to 74.4. No other boat in the race had the same drastic reduction in its stability index when the same math was applied. In addition, the panel noted that the Right Arm Curve (GZ Curve)—a graphic representation of the boat’s stability—revealed WingNuts to be just as stable inverted as it was right side up, sharply reducing any chance of recovery from a full capsize." "PS Analysis: The 2011 WingNuts Capsize Practical Sailor". Practical Sailor. April 2012.)

One meteorologist suggested these conditions should have been anticipated.:

== List of sportsboat classes ==
- B32
- Columbia 30 (Note: "But what is a sport boat? ... I think it may be more a frame of mind than a design type. ... a definition using the Columbia 30 ... The hull is designed for speed. It's also designed so that it can be trailered from regatta to regatta. ... extra-deep keel lifts ... knifelike rudder is removable. Beam is less than the 10-foot limit ... flared topsides ... make crew weight effective for stability. ... it seems that the sport boat has to be a high-powered, trailerable boat designed to maximize speed, including planing potential, for a given LOA while relying upon an active crew as an essential component of the boat's stability. [It is rigged like high-performance racing boats.])
- Elliot 5.9
- Elliott 7
- Elliot 780
- I550
- J/70
- Leech 6.5
- Magic 25
- Melges 24
- Ross 780
- Rocket 780
- Shaw 650
- Sports 8
- Stealth 7
- Stealth 8
- Thompson 7
- Thompson 750
- Thompson 8
- Viper 640
- VX One
- Open 5.70
- Open 6.50
- Open 7.50

== See also ==
- Trailer sailer
- Turtling (sailing)
- Ultra light displacement boat
- Venture 21 - the original sport boat, 1966
