= Herb Esse =

Australian rules footballer

Personal information
- Full name: Herbert Patrick Esse
- Born: 14 May 1920; Footscray, Victoria
- Died: 11 April 2000 (aged 79)
- Original team: West Footscray
- Height: 183 cm (6 ft 0 in)
- Weight: 75 kg (165 lb)

Playing career^{1}
Years	Club	Games (Goals)
1943–44	Footscray	10 (0)
- ^{1} Playing statistics correct to the end of 1944.

Herbert Patrick Esse (14 May 1920 – 11 April 2000) was an Australian rules footballer who played with Footscray in the Victorian Football League (VFL).

Esse served in both the Australian Army and the Royal Australian Air Force during World War II.
