= Parker Esse =

American choreographer

Parker Esse is an American choreographer. Esse began training at 9-years old at the Houston Ballet. After being cast in Fosse on Broadway in 2000, he proceeded to work on dozens of productions in prestigious regional theatres across the United States. In Washington, D.C. he worked as the assistant choreographer in the musical Mame and Babes in Arms. He also choreographed Smokey Joe's Cafe, The Music Man, Carousel and Fiddler on the Roof. In New York directed and choreographed The Best Little Whorehouse in Texas. He was the associate director and choreographer for Lucky Guy at Goodspeed Theatre.

== Awards ==
Esse received the Helen Hayes Award for his choreography of Arena Stage's Oklahoma!. Oklahoma was also the recipient of the New Yorker's Best Performers 2010. In total, he has been nominated for the Helen Hayes Award five times. These nominations included his work on The Music Man in 2013, Smokey Joe's Cafe: The songs of Leiber and Stoller in 2015, and Fiddler on the Roof, also in 2015.

== Professional credits ==
=== Broadway ===
- 2009 — Finian’s Rainbow — Associate Choreographer
- 2008 — A Tale of Two Cities — Associate Choreographer
- 1999 — Fosse — Replacement Performer

=== Off-Broadway ===
- 2012 — Rated P for Parenthood — Associate Choreographer
- 2009 — Girl Crazy — Associate Choreographer
- 2008 — On the Town — Associate Choreographer
- 2008 — Juno — Assistant Choreographer
- 2007 — Stairway to Paradise — Assistant Choreographer

=== Tours ===
- 2009 — The 101 Dalmatians Musical — Associate Choreographer

=== Regional performance credits ===
- 2002 — South Pacific — Arena Stage, "Radio Operator Bob McCaffrey"
- 2003 — Camelot — Regional Revival, "Sir Colgrevance"
- 2004 — Swing! — North Shore Music Theatre, "Comic Couple"
- 2006 — Mame — Kennedy Center Revival, "Ensemble"

=== Regional production credits ===
- 2003 — South Pacific — Arena Stage, Choreographer
- 2017 — The Pajama Game — Arena Stage, Choreographer
- 2017 — Rags — Goodspeed Opera House, Choreographer
- 2006 — Damn Yankees — Arena Stage, Assistant Choreographer
- 2006 — Mame — Arena Stage, Assistant Choreographer
- 2006 — Pirates of Penzance — Goodspeed, Assistant Choreographer
- 2007 — Pirates! — Paper Mill Playhouse, Assistant Choreographer
- 2008 — Dancing in the Dark — The Old Globe Theatre, Assistant Choreographer
- 2009 — Lucky Guy — Goodspeed, associate director, Choreographer
- 2011 — Follies — The Kennedy Center, Associate Choreographer
- 2012 — Finian's Rainbow — Catholic University Benhamin T. Rome School of Music, Choreographer
- 2013 — A Bed and a Chair: A New York Love Affair — Jazz at the Lincoln Center, Choreographer
- 2014 — Bull Durham — Alliance Theatre, Choreographer
- 2015 — Smokey Joe’s Cafe: The songs of Leiber and Stoller, Choreographer
- 2015 — Sweet Charity — Shaw Festival at Festival Theatre, Choreographer
- 2015 — A Wonderful Life — Arena Stage, Choreographer
- 2016 — West Side Story — Signature Theatre, Choreographer
- 2016 — Little Shop of Horrors — Berkshire Theatre Group, Choreographer
- 2016 — Carousel — Arena Stage, Choreographer
- 2017 — The Best Little Whorehouse in Texas — Merry Go Round Playhouse, Director/Choreographer
