= Daihatsu Esse =

Daihatsu Esse (L235)
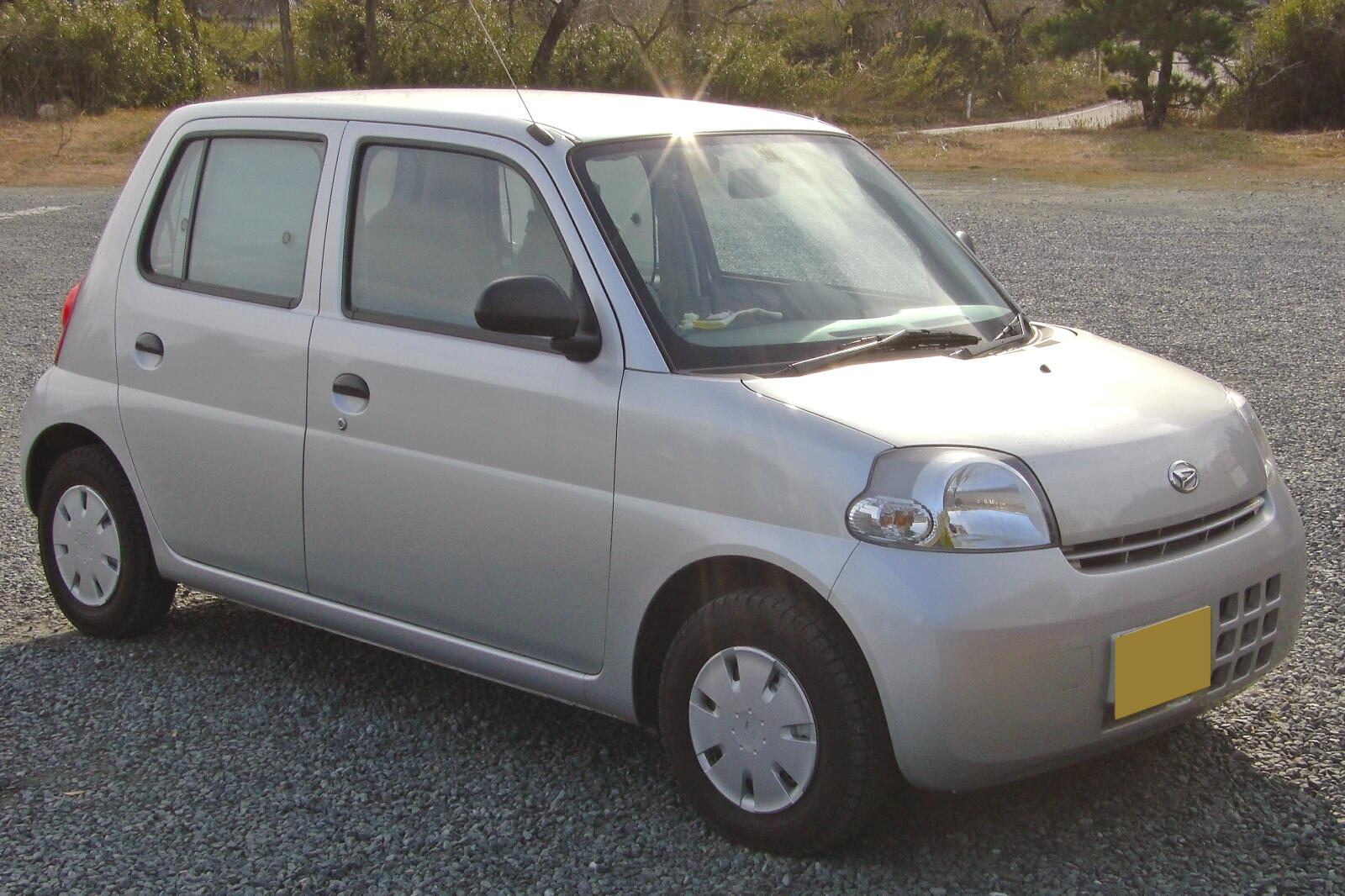

Overview
- Manufacturer: Daihatsu
- Production: December 2005 – September 2011
- Assembly: Japan
- Designer: Eiji Murakami

Body and chassis
- Class: Kei car
- Body style: 5-door hatchback
- Layout: Front-engine, front-wheel-drive; Front-engine, four-wheel-drive
- Related: Daihatsu Mira (L275)

Powertrain
- Engine: Petrol: 658 cc KF-VE I3
- Transmission: 3-speed automatic; 4-speed automatic; 5-speed manual

Dimensions
- Wheelbase: 2,390 mm (94.1 in)
- Length: 3,395 mm (133.7 in)
- Width: 1,475 mm (58.1 in)
- Height: 1,470 mm (57.9 in)
- Kerb weight: 700–780 kg (1,543–1,720 lb)

Chronology
- Successor: Daihatsu Mira e:S

The Daihatsu Esse (Japanese: ダイハツ・エッセ, Hepburn: Daihatsu Esse) is a kei car manufactured by the Japanese automaker Daihatsu. With a base price of ¥680,000, it was one of the cheapest new cars in Japan when launched in December 2005. According to Daihatsu, the name was derived from the Latin root for the English word "essence", but also serves as a backronym for "Eco, Simple and Smart, and Easy".

== Design ==
The Esse was sold as a 5-door hatchback in five trim levels (Eco, D, L, X, and Custom), with front- or four-wheel drive. The Esse Custom, introduced in November 2006, had a front lip spoiler, fog lights, side skirts, and sporty seats, but received no mechanical changes. All versions are powered by a 658 cc (40 cu in) KF-VE three-cylinder petrol engine producing 58 PS (43 kW) at 7,200 rpm.

== History ==
The Esse was first revealed in concept form during the 39th Tokyo Motor Show in 2005, entering the market late that year.

In addition to the aforementioned trim levels, the VS Memorial Edition (celebrating 100 years since the founding of Daihatsu's predecessor company) and D Selection special editions were offered in 2007. 2009 saw the consolidation of trim levels into D, X, and Custom, plus an economy-oriented X-Special trim that was discontinued the following year.

Production ended in September 2011, with the Esse being replaced by the Mira e:S. In total, 214,960 examples were built in just under six years.

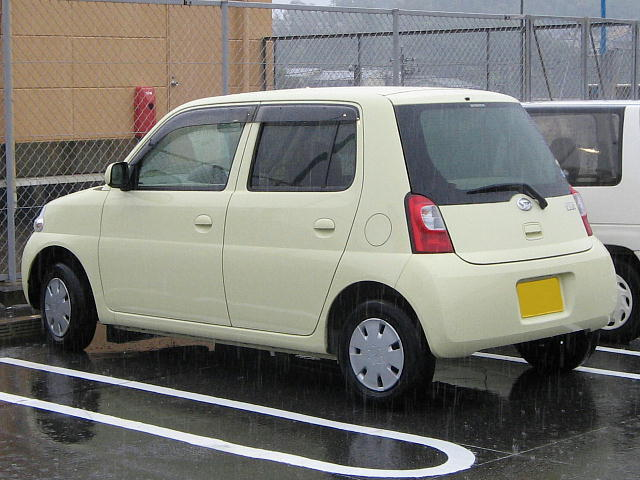
Rear view

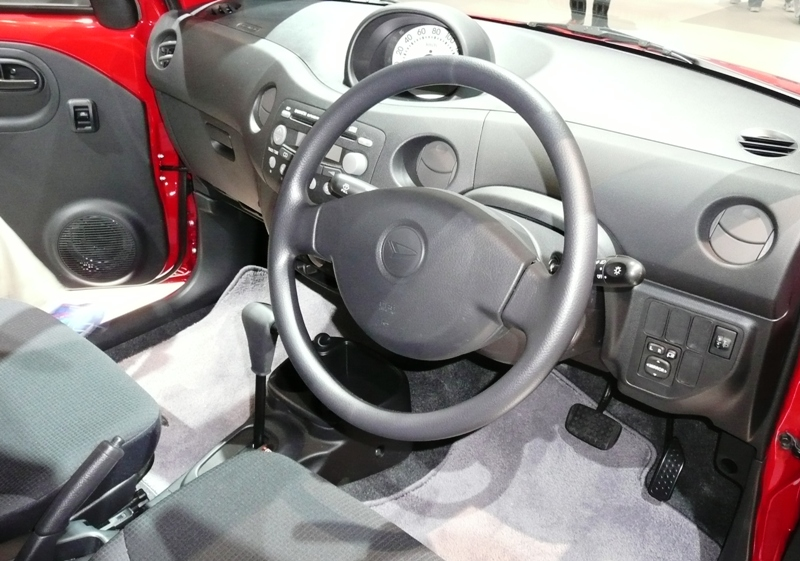
VS Memorial Edition interior

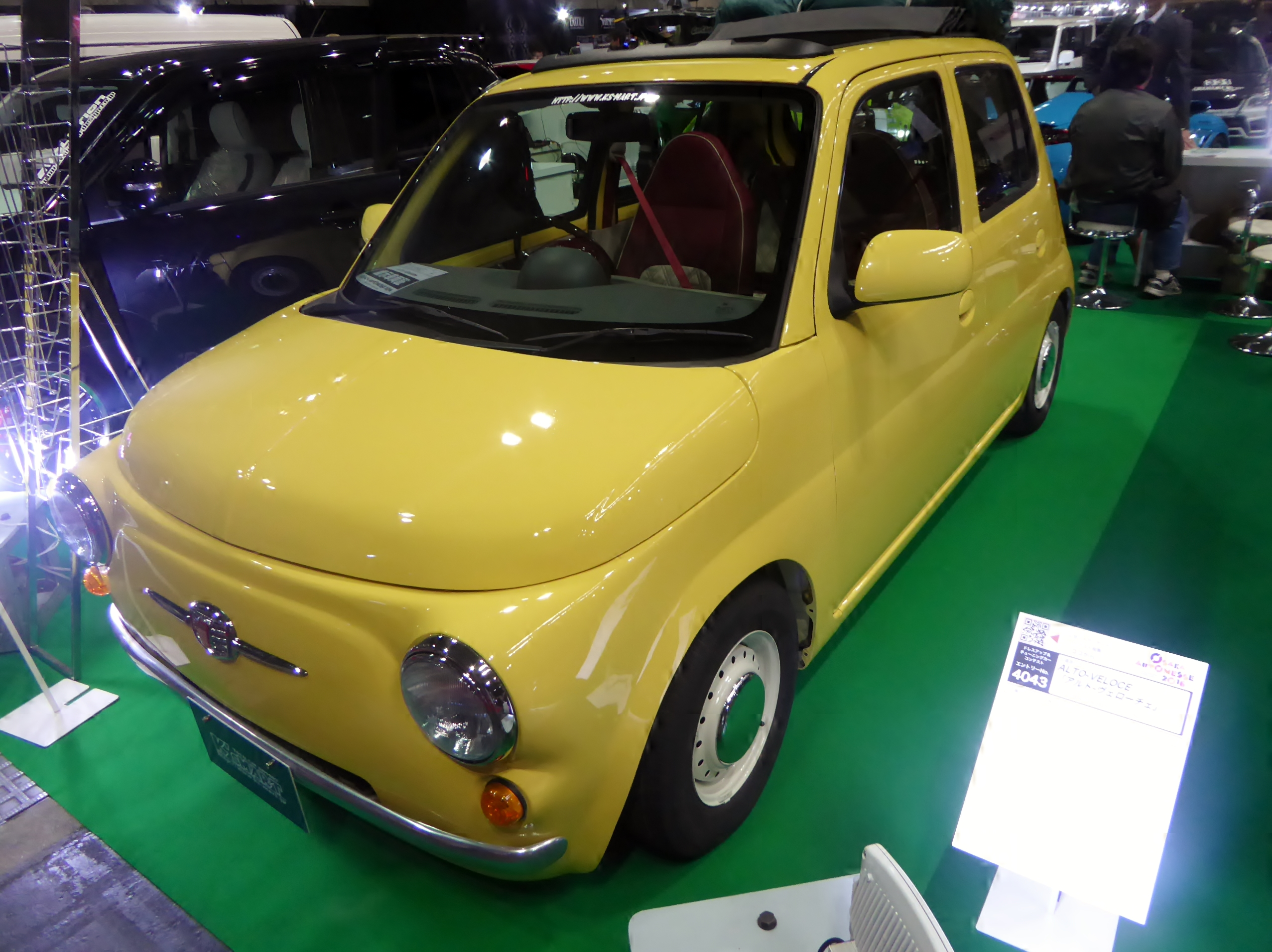
Customized "Esse Nova" resembling a Fiat 500
