= Esse, Cameroon =

Esse
- Commune and town
- Interactive map of Esse
- Coordinates: 4.0833°N 11.8833°E
- Country: Cameroon
- Region: Centre Region
- Time zone: UTC+1 (WAT)

Esse is a town and commune in Cameroon.

== See also ==
- Communes of Cameroon
