= Esse 850 =

Sportboat

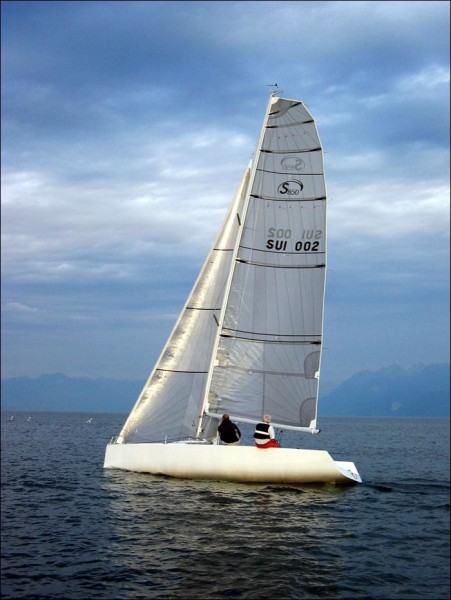

The Esse 850 is an 8.5 metre long racing sportboat designed by Umberto Felci and built by Josef Schuchter Sportboats of Stafa, Switzerland. The first hull was sold in 2004 and the Esse 850 International Class Association was begun in 2005 in Europe.

The design has achieved some popularity in Europe with over 110 boats in the one-design fleet by mid-2009. The design is unusual in that it is a very high performance sportboat designed to be raced with a crew of one to four sailors. Class rules established by Esse 850 International Class have a maximum crew weight of 280 kilos which effectively limits the crew to three athletic adults.

The design is characterized by a very large ballast to displacement ratio and a narrow hull of 2.2 metres beam and a tall mast with a high aspect ratio sail plan. In concert with most sportboats, the Esse 850 is designed as an alternative to the complexity of traditional sloop-rigged sailboats, with an emphasis on ease of handling with a small crew and exceptional speeds. Typically, sportboats such as the Esse 850 are much lighter and more powerful than their traditional counterparts. The reduced weight is usually the result of smaller accommodation volume in the hull and lower freeboard, hence less hull structure. The weight reduction over traditional designs means that a larger percentage of the total weight of the boat is concentrated in the keel providing greater stability and the ability to carry a larger sail plan for greater power.

The weight of the entire boat is 1180 kilograms, including the hull and standing rigging. The design concentrates the righting moment of the keel in a 770 kilogram torpedo-shaped bulb at the end of an airfoil shaped fin. The ballast to displacement ratio is 0.61 which provides an exceptionally "stiff" platform. The high righting moment allows the design to carry a larger than normal sail area which increases power and consequently speed through the water.

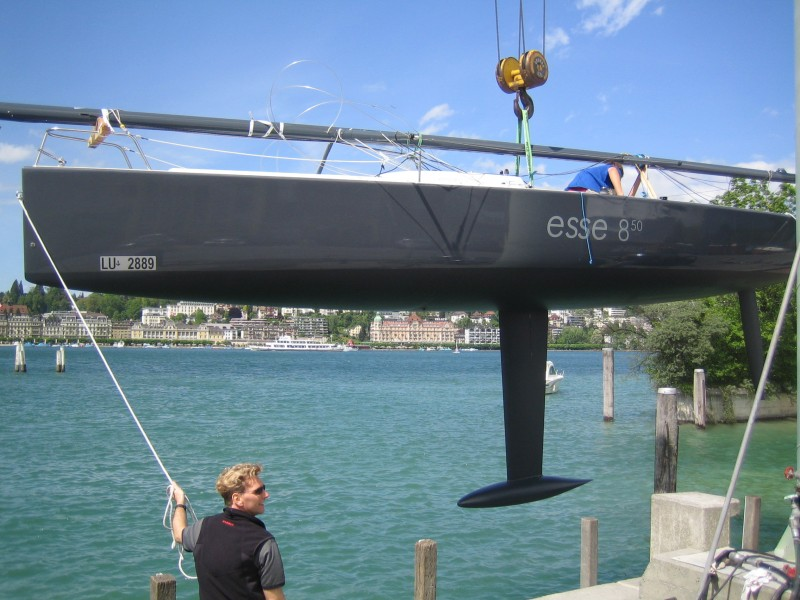

The Esse 850 is an example of the latest design concepts in high speed hulls and sail plans. The sail plan is characterized by a large mainsail and a high aspect ratio jib in a fractional rig design. These high speed fractional rigs are a nearly ubiquitous feature on sportboats and are used for their ease of handling and their high lift and low drag characteristics.

Hull shapes on sportboats are typically designed so that the hulls plane at high speeds. These hull designs are characterized by fairly sharp bows to allow them to penetrate waves with reduced drag and a flatter underbody aft of the bow. The flat underbody develops lift as speeds increase and the hull rises higher in the water, which reduces the wetted area and decreases drag, allowing higher speeds to be achieved.

The traditional spinnaker is replaced with a gennaker that is set on an extensible bowsprit. Using a bowsprit allows the size of the gennaker to be a much larger sail than would be possible with a spinnaker. The speeds achieved downwind by these designs can be remarkable. In the case of the Esse 850, speeds of 17 knots (20 mph; 31 km/h) are readily achievable in true wind velocities greater than 25 knots.

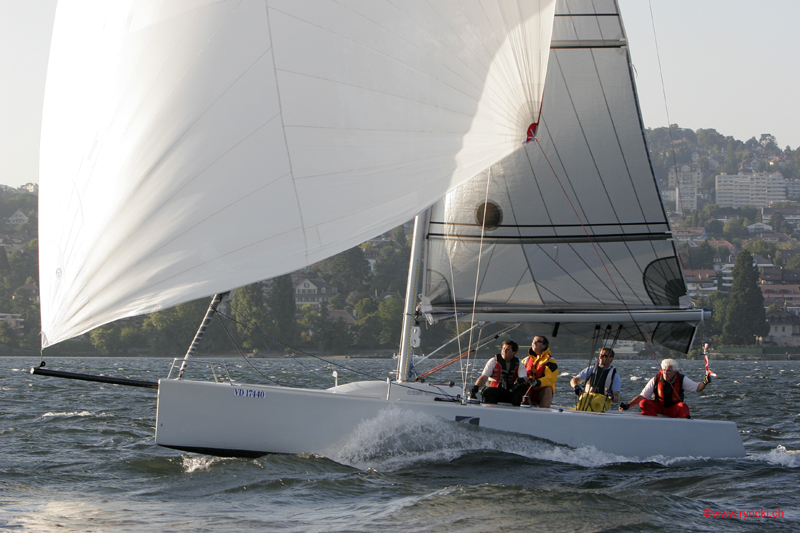

The Esse 850 design was selected as the European Yacht of the Year in 2005 and the Sailing World Magazine Overall Boat of The Year in 2007. There is an active owners group that promotes the design. Distribution in North America is by Esse Pacific Northwest.
