= The Wackiest Ship in the Army =

The Wackiest Ship in the Army may refer to:

- The Wackiest Ship in the Army (film), a 1960 comedy starring Jack Lemmon
- The Wackiest Ship in the Army (TV series), a 1965 show based on the film
