= Sailing barge =

A sailing barge is a kind of barge (a shoal-draft flat-bottomed boat) propelled by sails. Traditional types of sailing barges include:

- Dutch barge is a traditional flat-bottomed shoal-draught barge, originally used to carry cargo in the shallow Zuyder Zee and the waterways of Netherlands.
- Scow, derived from the Dutch "schouw", historically in common use in the American Great Lakes and other parts of the U.S., in southern England, and in New Zealand. By 1848 scows were being rigged for sailing using leeboards or sliding keels. They were also used as dumb barges towed by steamers.
- Thames sailing barge, a type of commercial sailing boat, once common on the River Thames in London. The flat-bottomed barges with a shallow draught and leeboards, were perfectly adapted to the Thames Estuary.
