= Keel =

Lower centreline structural element of a ship or boat hull

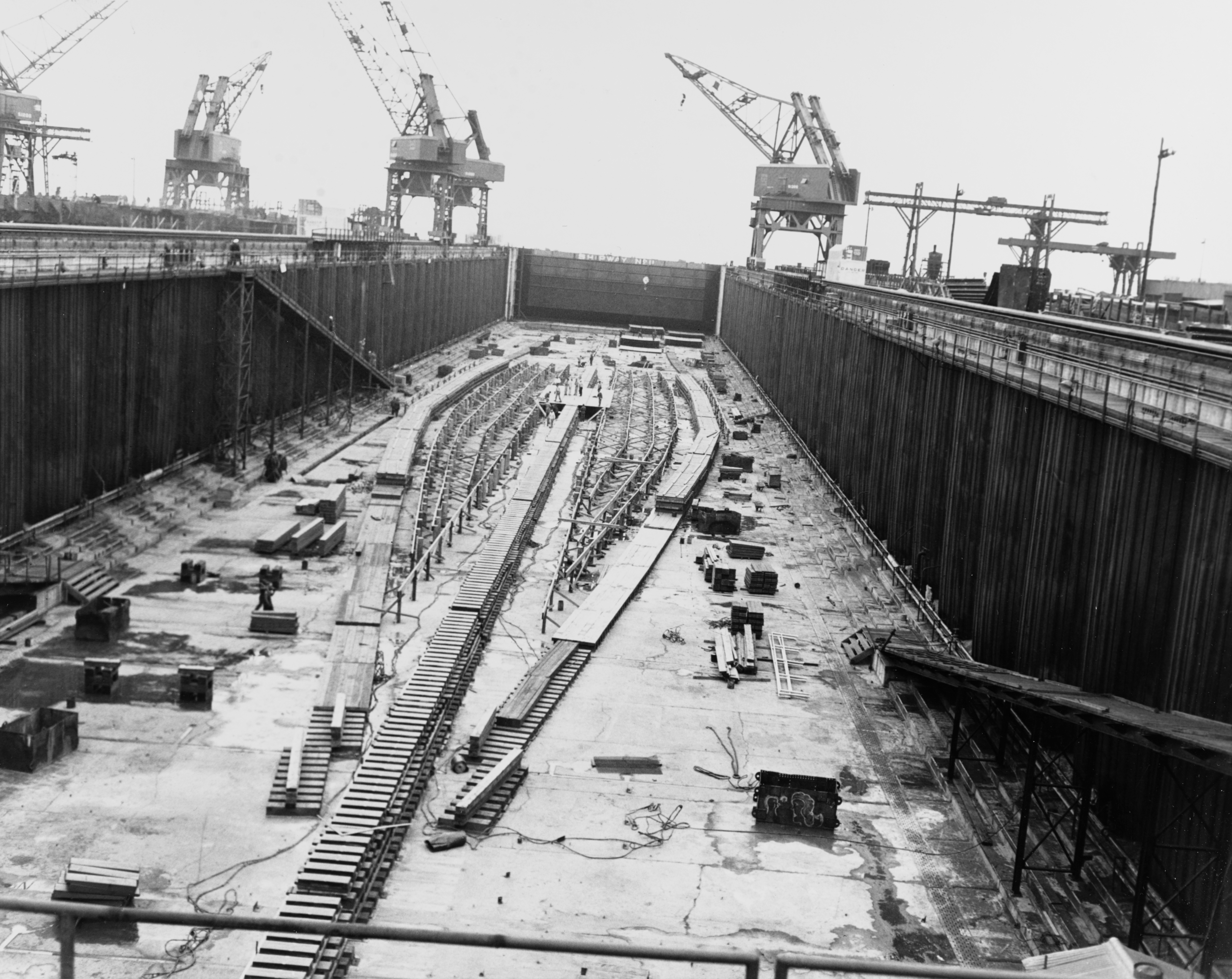
Keel laid for the USS United States in drydock

The keel is the bottom-most longitudinal structural element of a watercraft, important for stability. On some sailboats, it may have a hydrodynamic and counterbalancing purpose as well. The laying of the keel is often the initial step in constructing a ship. In the British and American shipbuilding traditions, this event marks the beginning date of a ship's construction.

== Etymology ==
The word "keel" comes from Old English cēol, Old Norse kjóll, = "ship" or "keel". It has the distinction of being regarded by some scholars as the first word in the English language recorded in writing, having been recorded by Gildas in his 6th century Latin work De Excidio et Conquestu Britanniae, under the spelling cyulae (he was referring to the three ships that the Saxons first arrived in).

Carina is the Latin word for "keel" and is the origin of the term careen (to clean a keel and the hull in general, often by rolling the ship on its side). An example of this use is Careening Cove, a suburb of Sydney, Australia, where careening was carried out in the early colonial days.

== History ==
=== Origins ===
Carvel-built hull construction (right) lines planks up edge to edge

The use of a keel in sailing vessels dates back to antiquity. The wreck of an ancient Greek merchant ship known as the Kyrenia ship establishes the origin of the keel at least as far back as 315 BC. The Uluburun shipwreck (c. 1325 BC) had a rudimentary keel, but it may have been more of a center plank than a keel.

=== Construction styles ===
==== Frame first ====
In carvel-built hulls, construction began with the laying of the keel, followed by the stern and stem. Frames were set up afterward, set at key points along the keel. Later, the keelson was attached to the keel, either bolted or with treenails.

==== Plank first ====
A plank first building system that is still in use today is clinker construction, using overlapping planks which are shaped to produce the hull form. Older systems include the bottom-based method used for the planking on either side of the keel of a cog (and also in Dutch shipbuilding up to and including the 17th century). This involves flush-fitted planks that have been cut to provide the shape of the hull. Still older is the mortise and tenon edge-to-edge joining of hull planks in the Mediterranean during the classical period. In this system, much of the strength of the hull is derived from the planking, with the frames providing some extra strength. In all these systems, the joining of the keel, stem and sternpost are the starting point of construction.

== Structural keels ==
A structural keel is the bottom-most structural member around which the hull of a ship is built. The keel runs along the centerline of the ship, from the bow to the stern. The keel is often the first part of a ship's hull to be constructed, and laying the keel, or placing the keel in the cradle where the ship will be built, may mark the start time of its construction. Large, modern ships are now often built in a series of pre-fabricated, complete hull sections rather than being built around a single keel, so the shipbuilding process commences with the cutting of the first sheet of steel.

The most common type of keel is the "flat plate keel", which is fitted in most ocean-going ships and other vessels. A form of keel found on smaller vessels is the "bar keel", which may be fitted in trawlers, tugs, and smaller ferries. Where grounding is possible, this type of keel is suitable with its massive scantlings, but there is always a problem of the increased draft with no additional cargo capacity. If a double bottom is fitted, the keel is almost inevitably of the flat plate type, bar keels often being associated with open floors, where the plate keel may also be fitted.

== Hydrodynamic keels ==
Hydrodynamic keels have the primary purpose of interacting with the water and are typical of certain sailboats. Fixed hydrodynamic keels have the structural strength to support the boat's weight.

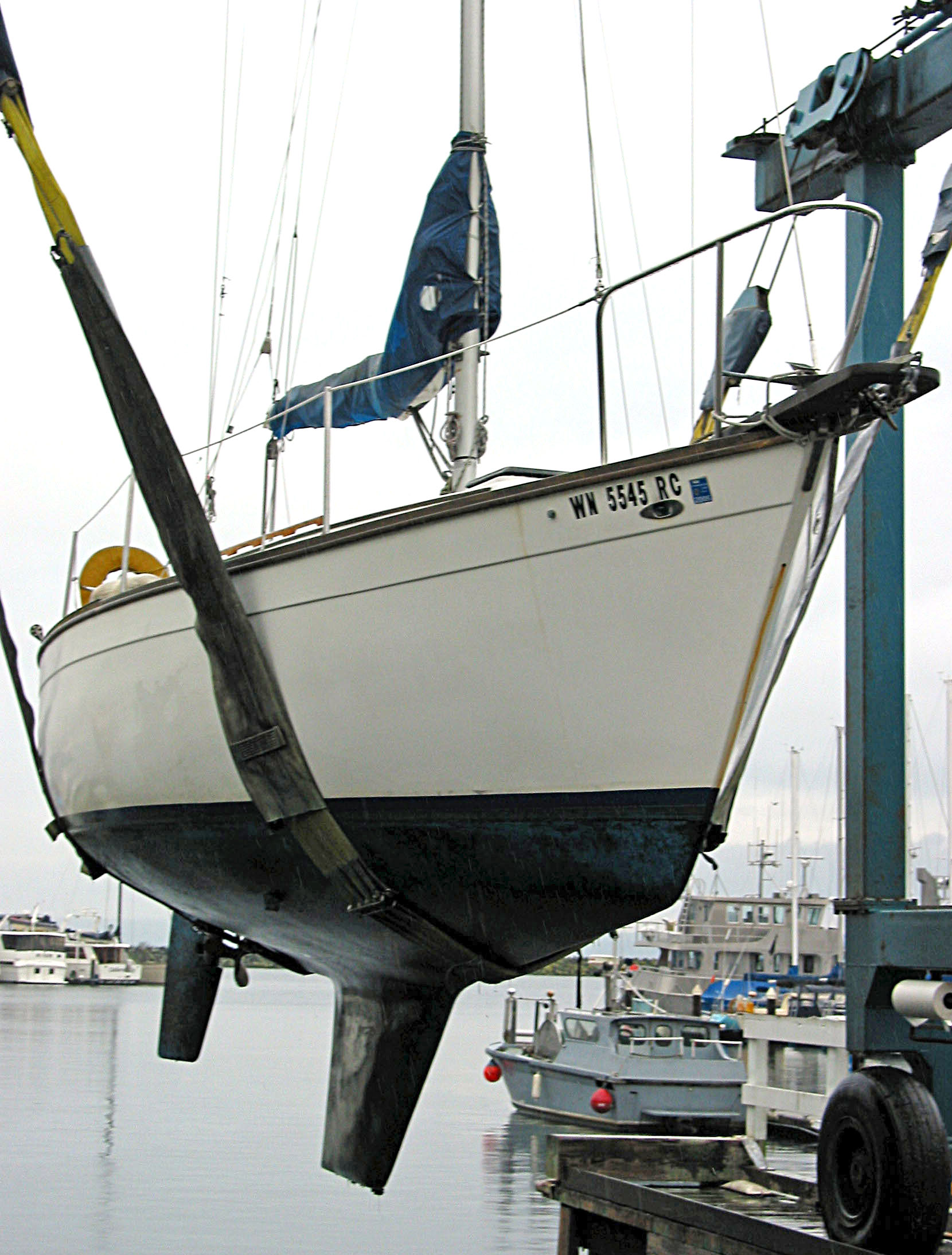
Sailing yacht with a fin keel

Lateral resistance effect of a sailing keel

Righting effect of a keel, where A is the center of buoyancy and G is the centre of gravity (hypothetical example).

=== Sailboat keels ===
In sailboats, keels may serve three purposes: underwater foil to minimize the leeway of the vessel under sail; counterweight to the lateral force of the wind on the sail(s) that causes rolling (heeling); as bilge keel to allow drying out (sit on mud, sand, shingle). As an underwater foil, a keel uses the forward motion of the boat to generate lift to counteract the leeward force of the wind. As a counterweight, a keel increasingly offsets the heeling moment with increasing angle of heel. Related foils include movable centreplates, which -being metal- have the secondary purpose of being a counterweight, and centreboards and daggerboards, which are of lighter weight, do not have the secondary purpose of being a counterweight.

Moveable sailboat keels may pivot (a centreboard, centreplate or swing keel), retract upwards (lifting/retracting keel or daggerboard), or swing sideways in the water (canting keels) to move the ballasting effect to one side and allow the boat to sail in a more upright position.

== See also ==
- Coin ceremony
- Kelson
- False keel
- Daggerboard
- Leeboard
- Bilgeboard
- Bruce foil
- Keelhauling – an archaic maritime punishment
- Keel block
- Under keel clearance

== Bibliography ==
- Rousmaniere, John, The Annapolis Book of Seamanship, Simon & Schuster, 1999
- Chapman Book of Piloting (various contributors), Hearst Corporation, 1999
- Herreshoff, Halsey (consulting editor), The Sailor's Handbook, Little Brown and Company
- Seidman, David, The Complete Sailor, International Marine, 1995
- Jobson, Gary, Sailing Fundamentals, Simon & Schuster, 1987
