= Bruce foil =

Leeward foil on a sailboat to reduce heeling

A Bruce foil is a variant of the leeboard, consisting of a foil typically mounted on an outrigger and always set at an angle to provide both lateral and vertical force. It was invented by Edmond Bruce in the early 1960s and first published in the Amateur Yacht Research Society publication in April 1965.

== Theory ==
Nearly all methods that increase resistance to sideways movement also cause heeling, the leaning produced by the imbalance of the forces on the sails, high above the waterline, and the sideways resistance, generated by the centerboard or other foil below the waterline. The resulting torque causes the hull to heel until the buoyancy of the hull provides sufficient torque to balance the heeling force. The limited buoyancy of the hull, therefore, limits the amount of force that the sail can effectively produce.

One solution to dealing with this limit is to bring the forces generated by the sail and the underwater foil into alignment, canceling as much of the torque as possible and thus reducing the amount of heeling. Two approaches to this have surfaced, one being the inclined rig and the other the Bruce foil.

== Implementation ==
A Bruce foil reduces torque by moving the foil far out from the centerline of the hull, and angling it so that a perpendicular line through the center of the underwater portion of the foil will intersect the center of pressure of the sails. Like a traditional centerboard, the Bruce foil is generally a symmetric design, such as the NACA 00xx series, which relies on the leeward slip of the hull to provide the angle of attack needed to generate lift. When mounted on the lee side, the Bruce foil generates an upward lift in addition to lateral force, and when mounted on the windward side, it generates a downward force.

Bruce foils can be mounted in pairs, one on each side, as used in some trimaran designs. In this case, the leeward foil works in conjunction with the leeward ama to provide lift, and the windward foil can be retracted to reduce drag.

At equilibrium, the force from the foil and the sail will always be balanced, so capsizing should be impossible, but in practice that is not the case. Since the foil's force is relative to the hull's movement through the water and the sail's force is relative to the wind moving past the sail, sudden changes in wind speed or direction can unbalance the foil and cause heeling. In addition, a foil on the windward side presents an unstable situation, since any lifting of the foil out of the water, by mechanisms such as heeling or wave action, will result in reduced downward force, potentially leading to capsize. A lee foil provides more stability, as loss of lift will force the foil back into the water.

== Advantages and disadvantages ==
The main advantage over a typical centerboard or leeboard is that the Bruce foil allows the sails to remain nearly upright and keep the full force of the wind available to drive movement without the crew needing to move their weight. The main disadvantage is that the sails remain upright and keep the full force of the wind available, rather than depowering with an increasing angle of heel as happens with traditional foils. The Bruce foil also produces increased drag as a result of the vertical component of force, as well as a yawing force due to the off-center placement of the foil, which may require alteration of the steering system to compensate.
