= I-20 (sailing scow) =

Type of sailing vessel

- Class symbol

Development
- Name: I-20

Boat
- Crew: 2

Hull
- Type: Monohull
- Construction: Fibreglass
- Hull weight: 595 lb (270 kg)
- LOA: 20 ft (6.1 m)
- Beam: 5 ft 8 in (1.73 m)

Sails
- Mainsail area: 114 sq ft (10.6 m^{2})
- Jib/genoa area: 62 sq ft (5.8 m^{2})
- Spinnaker area: 265 sq ft (24.6 m^{2})

The I-20 is a modernized version of the M-20. It is a 20 ft (6.1 m) sloop rigged scow with a spinnaker. The boat was first built at Melges Boat Works, now Melges Performance Sailboats. The boat has two bilgeboards and two small rudders. After a couple years of experimentation, the class settled on its current rules in 2002. The new rules permitted a larger, asymmetrical spinnaker and a carbon fiber rig. It is currently made by Windward Boatworks. In 2005, Melges brought out a new Melges 17 to compete with the I-20.
