= Puddle Duck Racer =

Type of racing sailboat

Development
- Designer: David "Shorty" Routh (PDRacer.com rules)

Boat
- Crew: 1-2

Hull
- Type: Monohull (Scow)
- LOA: 8 ft (2.4 m)

Rating
- RYA PN: 140.0

A Puddle Duck Racer or PD Racer is an 8-foot (2.44 m) long, 4 foot (1.22 m) wide, 16 inch (40 cm) high, spec series, racing sailboat. It is a one design hull shape with wide options in other areas. Billed as "the easiest sailboat in the world to build", the scow hull is a simple box, usually built of plywood. PD Racers have a Portsmouth handicap rating of 140.0 and their USSA code is PDR.

== History and scope ==
Designed by David "Shorty" Routh, the PD Racer design was first published and released in 2003, and the first hull was built in January 2004. With a focus on a simple design that uses low cost materials, PD Racers are intended to be accessible to a wide variety of people. All the materials needed to build the boat can be found at a hardware store, and the dimensions allow for a tolerance of a quarter-inch, allowing for less experienced builders to assemble a boat that fits within the design rules. They can be cheap to build, with a simple plastic tarp for a sail, and reports place the cost to build the boat as ranging from $150 to $300 to construct. The design is suitable for use in school projects.

PD Racer hulls are numbered after photographic proof is given that that hull has been completed rather than assigned by the plan number a builder is given. To register a hull and receive a hull number, the basic hull (four sides, and two airboxes attached to a plywood bottom) must be assembled (called "going 3D" by the builders). Since many people may order plans and never build the boat, photographic evidence gives a more accurate estimate of boat numbers. In late 2013, there were over 850 PD Racers registered in North America. Internationally, registered boats can be found in countries such as Australia, England, Germany and Argentina.

=== Puddle Duck Hatch ===
During the weekend of April 28–30, 2006, there was a "Puddle Duck Hatch" held in Summerland, British Columbia. Organized by PD Racer enthusiast Gordon Seiter, the event, gathered various groups from the area to build PD Racers on Friday and Saturday, and then race them on Sunday. The build was sponsored by various local merchants. 10 boats were built at the hatch, which brought the number of registered hulls to 99, and hulls 100 and 101 "went 3D" during the same time in other locations, bringing the hull count to 101.

In May 2007 a second Hatch was held and five boats were built. 2008 saw the name of the event changed to the Summerland TimberMart Hatch and saw five more boats built.

In Fall of 2010, Summerland hosted the 2010 Puddle Duck "World Championship" Race.

== Design ==
The original PDRacer.com sanctioned dimensions to which a PD Racer must conform; the lower 10 inches (25.4 cm) of the hull, not counting foils, must match the given dimensions.

The design was influenced by the $50 Sailboat Race, the Moth class, Gavin Atkins's Mouse Boat group, Jim Michalak boat designs, the Phil Bolger "Brick" design, and a number of other box boats. It is effectively a "sailing box" with 16" sides. Puddle Duck Racers generally are built with two airboxes, either placed along the sides of the boat or at the bow and stern. If placed on the sides, they also provide for seating for the crew. The airboxes provide flotation if the boat capsizes, and can be used for storage.

As a development class, the PD Racer specifications allow for builders to experiment with different configurations. The PD Racer specifications only apply to the hull, allowing for various types of sailing rigs, and either leeboards or centreboards. Although the boats are required to conform to a specific shape for use in class racing, the hull can also be used for recreational sailing, paddling, and motoring.

=== Configurations ===
The main hull configurations are:

- "End Airbox" design, with the airboxes positioned at the bow and stern of the craft.
- "Full Length Side Airboxes", with the airboxes running along each side.
- "Foam or other forms of flotation positioned under side, bow, or stern decks.

Alternatives include building a small cabin onto the boat, and a modular design that can be disassembled for transport.
