= Groote Beer (botter yacht) =

Boat

Groote Beer is a 52 foot long (LOD) wooden yacht with design elements of a barge, built in Huizen, Netherlands during World War II. Rumored to be built for German Air Marshall Hermann Göring. (Actual customer was a German industrialist named Temmler profiting from the war efforts.) The design is based on the shallow draft, leeboard equipped, sailing vessels designed as workboats in the North Sea and capable of carrying goods far inland on the canals of the Netherlands and elsewhere. WWII ended before the boat was completed, awaiting a new customer. In 1947, it was sold to William Greeve, who completed the stunningly ornate construction to match the original design rumors, sailed the boat, and eventually sold it to Charles M. Donnelly (Director of Feadship, Inc.). It was shipped across the Atlantic to the East Coast of the United States to be used to show the talents of Dutch shipbuilders. During his ownership, it was seen in a number of events and ports but also was involved in a storm incident that damaged a few beach houses and the boat.

It was sold in 1955 to Robert Johnson who sailed it through the Panama Canal, eventually bringing it to Portland, Oregon.

Johnson donated the Groote Beer to the St. Elisabeth Parish "Youth Afloat" program in 1958. The program had been created around the donation but did not materialize into a successful sail training or youth development program.

Bought by Howard Luray, who lived in Malibu, California, at the time who enjoyed the boat for three years. It was sold to Mrs. Robbie Keating of Santa Monica, California, who bought the boat as a gift to her husband. Only two years later she sold the boat to Dale Cooper of Irvine, California. Cooper kept the boat until 1973 when he sold it to Stuart Anderson who had the boat delivered on her own keel to San Francisco and then on to Seattle.

Donated in 1978 by Stuart Anderson (restaurateur) to the Chief Seattle Council of the Boy Scouts of America. Entrusted to Explorer Scout post 818 (primarily a Search & Rescue Explorer Post) from December 25, 1978, until late 1983. During that period, the Groote Beer sailed the inland waters of the Salish Sea and participated in wooden boat shows from Vancouver and Victoria, British Columbia, to Port Townsend, and Seattle, Washington.

It was purchased from the Boy Scouts by Cliff and Ruth Ann Fremstad, who resold the boat in 2001 to current owner Jan Willem de la Porte. The years had been hard on the wooden boat so the Groote Beer was shipped back to Spakenburg, Netherlands and enjoyed a complete restoration, then sailed many times after restoration on the IJsselmeer. Unfortunately, while being transported within a shipyard for seasonal servicing, the 38 ton Groote Beer dropped from the lift, damaging both itself and crushing a parked car. As of early 2015, the boat repair was still in court awaiting resolution.

As of 2017 the Groote Beer is now repaired and back in the water at the harbor of Spakenburg.
