= Scow =

Type of flat-bottomed barge

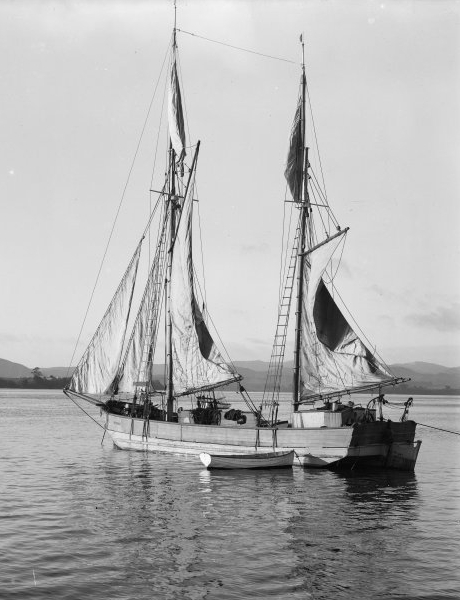
A New Zealand scow around 1900

A scow is a smaller type of barge. Some scows are rigged as sailing scows. In the 19th and early 20th centuries, scows carried cargo in coastal waters and inland waterways, having an advantage for navigating shallow water or small harbours. Scows were in common use in the American Great Lakes and other parts of the U.S., Canada, southern England, and New Zealand. In modern times their main recreational purpose is for racing, but the hull type is widely used in the construction industry and as garbage scows for aquatic transport of refuse.

== Scows ==
The name "scow" derives from the Dutch schouw. Old Saxon has a similar word scaldan which means to push from the shore, clearly related to punting. A second theory suggests that schouw comes from schol or schouw, meaning "shallow," referring to the vessel’s usefulness in shallow waters due to its flat bottom. A third theory also connects the word to the act of pushing, proposing that the schouw could be pushed over reed beds and low dikes, allowing access to shallow peat lakes. The Dutch word schouw is also associated with ferryboats; 40 different places in the Netherlands include schouw in their name are or were locations of a ferry crossing.

The basic scow was developed as a flat-bottomed barge (i.e. a large punt) capable of navigating shallow rivers and sitting comfortably on the bottom when the tide was out. By 1848 scows were being rigged for sailing using leeboards or sliding keels. They were also used as dumb barges towed by steamers. Dumb scows were used for a variety of purposes: garbage (see The Adventures of Tugboat Annie), dredging (see Niagara Scow) as well as general estuarine cargos.

=== Sailing scows ===
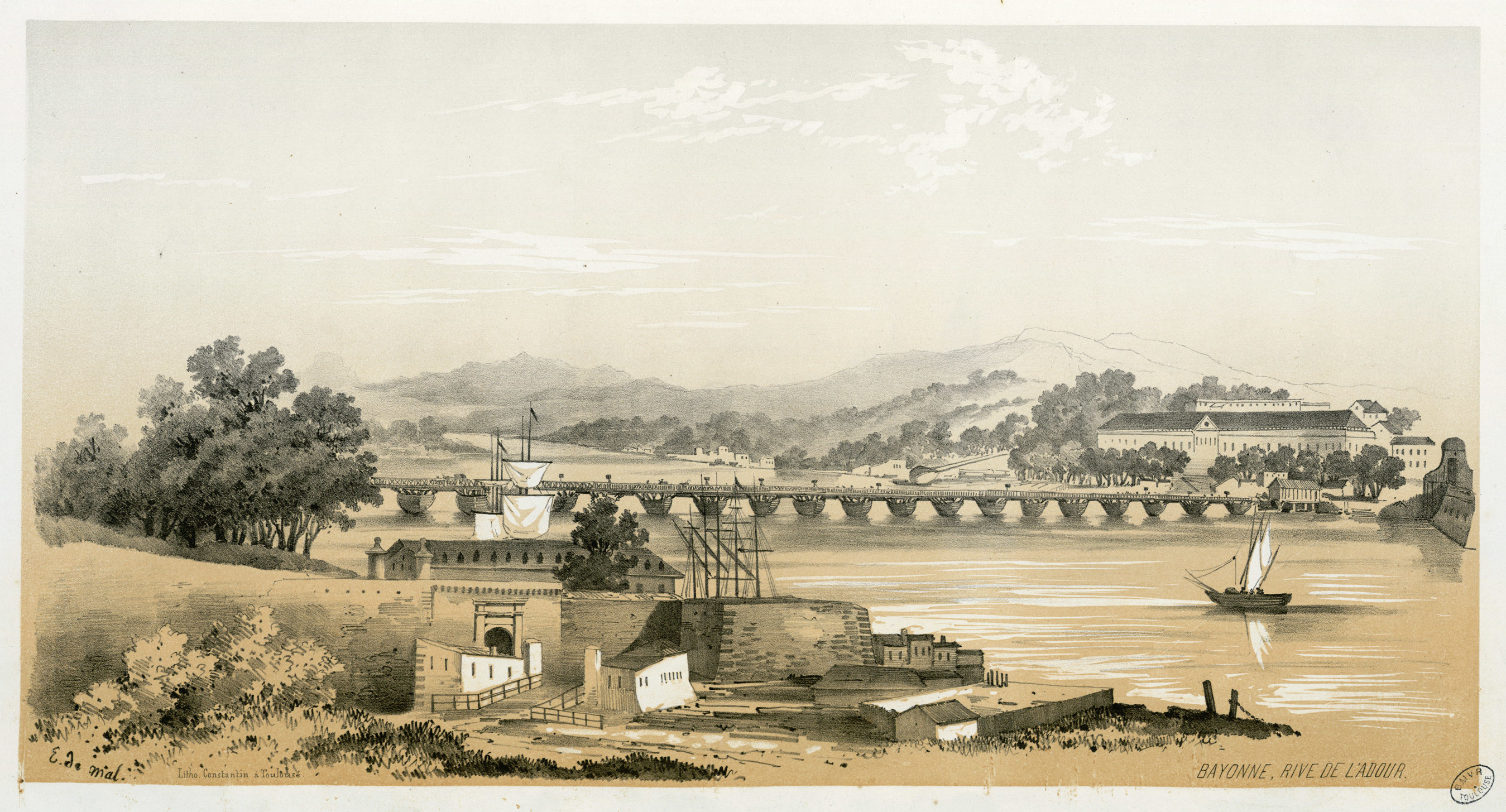
A scow on the Adour in Bayonne in 1843 by Eugène de Malbos.

Sailing scows have significant advantages over traditional deep-keel sailing vessels that were common at the time the sailing scow was popular. Keelboats, while stable and capable in open water, were incapable of sailing into shallow bays and rivers, which meant that to ship cargo on a keelboat required a suitable harbour and docking facilities, or else the cargo had to be loaded and unloaded with smaller boats. Flat-bottomed scows, on the other hand, could navigate shallow waters, and could even be beached for loading and unloading. This made them useful for moving cargo from inland regions unreachable by keelboat to deeper waters where keelboats could reach. The cost of this shallow water advantage was the loss of the seaworthiness of flat-bottomed scow boats in open water and bad weather.

The squared-off shape and simple lines of a scow make it a popular choice for simple home-built boats made from plywood. Phil Bolger and Jim Michalak, for example, have designed a number of small sailing scows, and the PD Racer and the John Spencer designed Firebug are growing classes of home-built sailing scow. Generally these designs are created to minimize waste when using standard 4-foot by 8-foot sheets of plywood.

The scow hull is also the basis for the shantyboat or, on the Chesapeake, the ark, a cabin houseboat once common on American rivers. The ark was used as portable housing by Chesapeake watermen, who followed, for example, shad runs seasonally.

The Thames sailing barge and the Norfolk wherry are two British equivalents to the scow schooner. The Thames sailing barges, while used for similar tasks, used significantly different hull shapes and rigging.

The term scow is used in and around the west Solent for a traditional class of sailing dinghy. Various towns and villages claim their own variants (Lymington, Keyhaven, Yarmouth, West Wight, Bembridge, Chichester), they are all around 11 feet (3.35 m) in length and share a lug sail, pivoting centre board, small foredeck and a square transom with a transom-hung rudder.

=== Dutch GWS-schouw ===
In the Netherlands, the GWS-schouw is a traditional flat-bottomed sailing boat derived from small working craft once used on the Frisian peat lakes. The class is still actively raced and maintained by the Vereniging Grouwster Watersport (GWS) in Grou, Friesland. The boats are about 5 m long with approximately 11 m² of sail area (main and jib combined) and are rigged with a characteristic spritsail (spriettuig). GWS-schouwen are built of riveted steel and represent one of the few surviving national “schouw” classes that preserve the traditional design and sailing culture of Friesland.

=== Scow schooners ===
An American design that reached its zenith of size on the American Great Lakes, and was also used widely in New Zealand, the schooner-rigged scow was used for coastal and inland transport, from colonial days to the early 1900s. Scow schooners had a broad, shallow hull, and used centreboards, bilgeboards or leeboards rather than a deep keel. The broad hull gave them stability, and the retractable foils allowed them to move even heavy loads of cargo in waters far too shallow for keelboats to enter. The squared-off bow and stern accommodated a large cargo. The smallest sailing scows were sloop-rigged (making them technically a scow sloop), but were otherwise similar in design. The scow sloop eventually evolved into the inland lake scow, a type of fast racing boat.

Sailing scows were popular in the American South for economic reasons, because the pine planks found there were difficult to bend, and because inlets along the Gulf Coast and Florida were often shallow.

A comparative study of the commercial sailing scows of the Great Lakes to those in New Zealand showed that both types reached their zenith in popularity during the frontier or early commercial eras when improved roads and ports were still developing.

=== New Zealand trading scows ===
The American scow design was copied and modified in New Zealand by early immigrant settlers to Auckland in the 1870s. In 1873, a sea captain named George Spencer, who had once lived and worked on the American Great Lakes and had gained a first-hand knowledge of the practical working capabilities of the sailing barges that plied their trade on the lakes, recognised the potential use of similar craft in the protected waters of the Hauraki Gulf, Auckland. He commissioned a local shipbuilder, Septimus Meiklejohn, to construct a small flat-bottomed sailing barge named the Lake Erie. An account of the launching of this vessel appeared in 1873 in the Auckland newspaper, The Daily Southern Cross, which gave its readers a good idea of the distinctive construction and advantages over other vessels.

The Lake Erie was 60 feet 6 inches in length, seventeen feet 3 inches in breadth and had a draught of three feet 4 inches. It was fitted with lee boards (a type of keel slotted onto the sides of the vessel), but these were highly impracticable in rough weather on the New Zealand coast. Later scows were constructed with the much safer slab-sided centre board, which crews raised and lowered as required. This one small craft spawned a fleet of sailing scows that became associated with the gum trade and the flax and kauri industries of northern New Zealand.

Scows came in all manner of shape and sizes and all manner of sailing rigs, but the "true" sailing scow displayed no fine lines or fancy rigging. They were designed for hard work and heavy haulage and they did their job remarkably well. They took cattle north from the stockyards of Auckland and returned with a cargo of kauri logs, sacks of kauri gum, shingle, firewood, flax or sand. With their flat bottoms they could be sailed or poled much further up the many tributaries and rivers where the bushmen and bullock teams had the freshly sawn kauri logs amassed, thereby saving a great deal of time and energy on the part of the bushmen. Flat-bottomed scows were also capable of grounding on a beach for loading and unloading. Over the side went duckboards, wheelbarrows, and banjo shovels. The crew then filled the vessel with sand, racing against the turn of the tide. When the tide did turn, they loaded the equipment back on board and put off to sea. Occasionally an inexperienced skipper overloaded the scow. Then, as the water rose against the outside of the hull (diminishing the amount of safe "free board"), the crew had to shovel rapidly to reduce the contents in the hold to a safe level.

Logs when hauled were always carried above deck, secured by heavy chain, the space between decks being left empty to give added buoyancy. The logs were taken to Auckland and unloaded into floating "booms" to await breaking down in the sawmills of the Kauri Timber Company and other such mills that operated right on the edge of Auckland Harbour.

The golden age of scows and schooners lasted from the 1890s to the end of the First World War, when schooners were superseded by steamers and scows were gradually replaced with tugs.

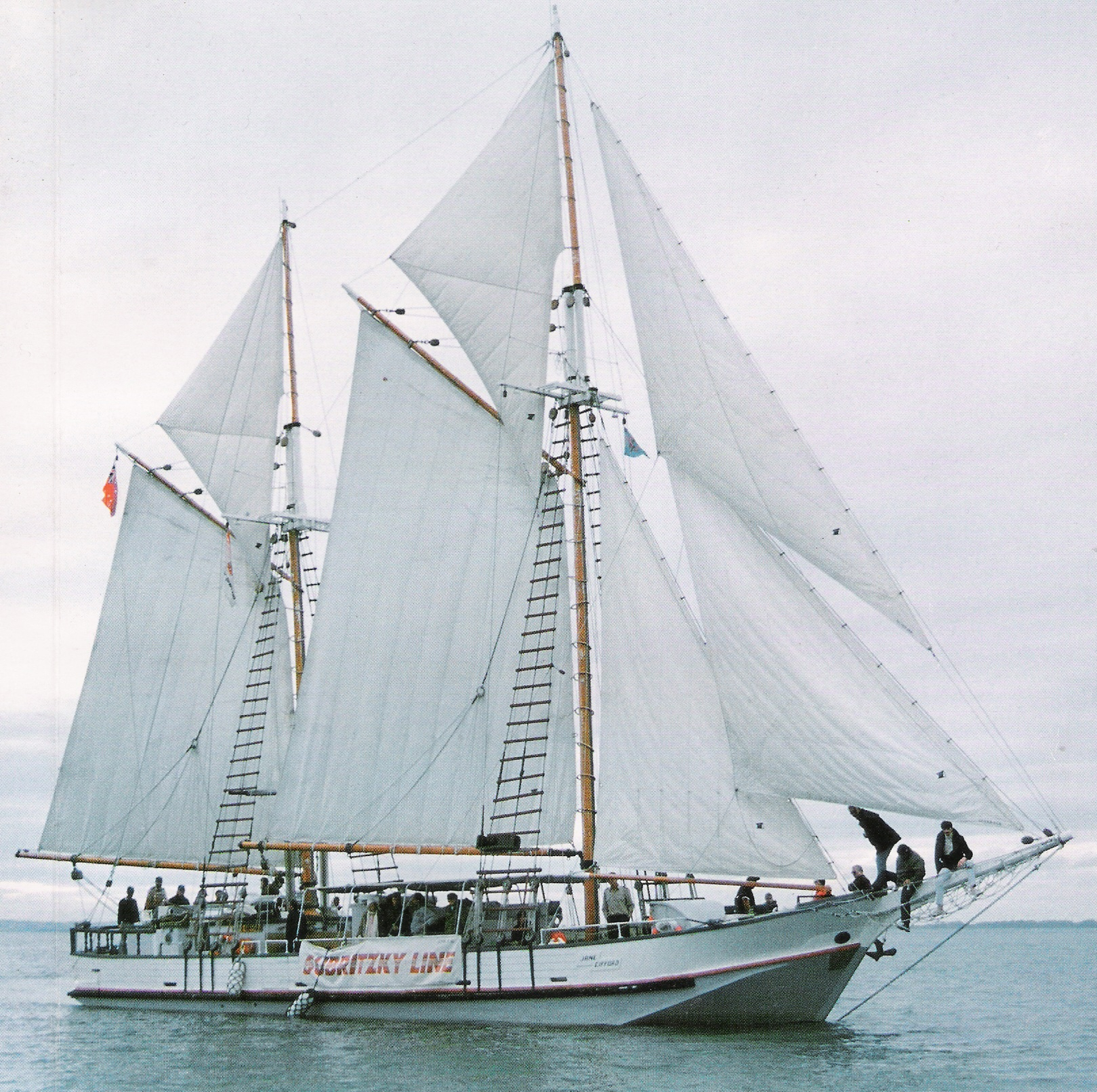
Jane Gifford Re-rigged, Manukau Harbour 1993. Photo: Subritzky Collection.

The Subritzky family of Northland operated the scows Jane Gifford and Owhiti as the last fleet of working scows, operating between the Port of Auckland and the Island communities of the Hauraki Gulf. The Jane Gifford was gifted to the Waiuku Historical Society by Captain Bert Subritzky and his wife Moana in 1985, where it was re-masted and re-rigged to its original splendour. The Owhiti was sold to Captain Dave Skyme and fully restored to its 1924 sea worthiness, and it subsequently starred in the 1983 movie Savage Islands (starring Tommy Lee Jones and amongst others Kiwi icon and singer Prince Tui Teka as King Ponapa). Unfortunately the Owhiti was not maintained for a period of time, during which teredo shipworms destroyed much of her structure. She remains in a deteriorating condition at Opua. Her rig may see use in another scow when restored.

The main differences from American scows were sharper bows and favouring the ketch rig instead of the schooner rig, although a great many schooner- and topsail schooner-rigged vessels were built. Some 130 scows were built in the north of New Zealand between 1873 and 1925; they ranged from 45 to 130 ft (14–40 m). New Zealand trading scows travelled all around New Zealand as well as to Australia and to the west coast of America although the majority were based in the Hauraki Gulf of New Zealand.

=== Notable sailing scows ===
The scow schooner Alma of San Francisco, built in 1891, restored in the 1960s, and designated a National Historic Landmark (NHL) in 1988, was one of the last scow schooners in operation. She is a small example, 59 feet in length, 22.6 feet in beam, with a draft of 4 feet and a loaded displacement of 41 tons.

Elsie was the last scow sloop operated on the Chesapeake Bay. Although sailing scows were once numerous around the Bay, they are poorly documented.

The Ted Ashby is a ketch-rigged scow built in 1993 and based at the New Zealand National Maritime Museum in Auckland, it regularly sails the Auckland harbour as a tourist attraction. It was named after an old-time New Zealand seafarer and scowman, Ted Ashby, who had the foresight to document much of the history of these coastal work horses in his book Phantom Fleet - The Scows and Scowmen of Auckland, which was published by A. H. & A. W. Reed, Wellington, in 1976.

The Jane Gifford is a ketch-rigged deck scow built in 1908 by Davey Darroch, Big Omaha, New Zealand. The vessel was re-launched at Waiuku on the 28 November 1992, with Captain Basil Subritzky, the son of the late Captain Bert Subritzky and his family as guests of honour. The Jane Gifford then commenced sailings and tours on the Manukau Harbour between Waiuku and the Onehunga Wharf. In 1999 she was pulled out of the water for a rebuild, which commenced at Okahu Bay on the Waitemata Harbour. She then sat rotting until 2005, when she was moved to Warkworth for rebuilding. A full rebuild, using modern materials has been done at Warkworth, and the vessel was relaunched on 16 May 2009. She returned to sail later, and has been occasionally under sail in the Hauraki Gulf. She is the only original New Zealand scow still afloat to carry sail.

The Echo was built in 1905 of kauri in New Zealand. She is 104 feet (32 m) long, with two masts and topsail rigged. Twin diesel engines were installed in 1920. In 1942–44 she was used by US forces in the Pacific, see USS Echo (IX-95). Her story was the basis for the 1960 film with Jack Lemmon, The Wackiest Ship in the Army and the 1965 TV series. She was nearly broken up in 1990, but is now preserved at Picton, New Zealand

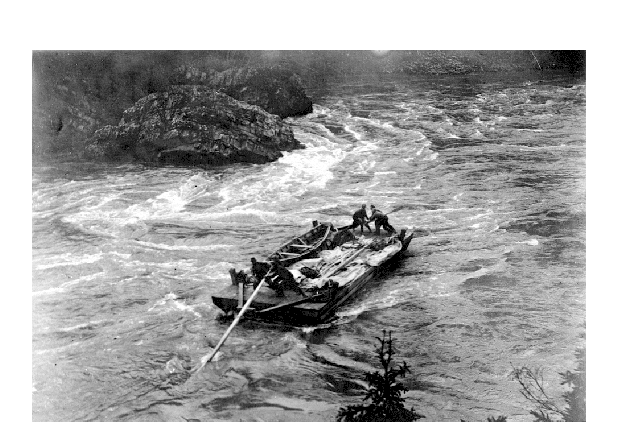
Scow in the treacherous Grand Canyon of the Fraser, BC, c.1908.

Howard I. Chapelle documented a number of scows in his book American Small Sailing Craft.

=== North American commercial scows ===
Scows were widely used to carry freight and passengers along or across inland waterways, sometimes preceding the arrival of railway transportation. Many scows were pulled/pushed by a tug or shore cable, whereas others were powered only by the current.

Historic 19th-century US canals used work scows for canal construction and maintenance, as well as ice breaker scows, filled with iron or heavy objects, to clear ice from canals.

The Niagara Scow is a former dredging scow stuck on the rocks in the Niagara River upstream from the brink of Niagara Falls Horseshoe Falls since 1918. After being stuck in place for more than 100 years, in November 2019, the scow broke loose during a wind storm and moved 50 metres (164 ft) closer to the edge of the Horseshoe Falls.

== Racing boats: the inland lake scows ==
In the early 20th century, smaller sloop and cat rigged scows became popular sailboats on inland lakes throughout the midwestern United States. First popularized by Johnson Boat Works in Minnesota, these boats were distinguished by their larger sail plans, retractable bilgeboards, and (in some classes) twin rudders. There are many active racing classes throughout the Midwest, Western New York, the New Jersey Shore and parts of the South. These boats are traditionally identified by their class letters:

- A: The largest inland lake scow at 38 feet long, the A normally requires a crew of six or seven. The sail plan includes a mainsail, a jib, and a large asymmetrical spinnaker. It has twin rudders. A new A scow (with sails and a trailer) cost $200,000 in 2020. Once the fastest monohull sailboat in the world, has been clocked in at 33 knots (61 km/h; 38 mph). It is possible to waterski behind these sailboats, as demonstrated by Buddy Melges.
- E: This is essentially a smaller version of the A scow. Only 28 feet long, it requires a crew of three or four. In 2007, the class association NCESA voted to make the asymmetrical spinnaker the class legal standard.
- M-16: This 16-foot scow crews two, and has a mainsail and jib but no spinnaker. It has tiny dual rudders like the A and the E.
- M-20: A 20-foot version of the M-16, with the addition of a backstay, a tunnel hull, twin bilgeboards and rudders, and a spinnaker. Modern boats are built with both the symmetrical spinnaker, or the I-20 version with an asymmetrical spinnaker. Because of the hull configuration, at a substantial angle of heel, it is similar to having a catamaran on one hull: the ratio of waterline length to breadth increases dramatically, along with a geometric increase in speed.
- C: This is a 20-foot catboat with one large sail set far forward on the hull. It requires a crew of two or three. Unlike the A and E, the C-scow has a large, efficient single rudder. It has no permanent backstay, so jibing the boat requires the quick use of running backstays.
- MC: The MC is a "mini-C" of sorts, a 16-foot cat-rigged boat with a higher and narrower sailplan. It also has a large efficient single rudder. It can be sailed competitively by 1 person. This is a growing class, especially popular in the midwest and southern USA.
- 17: Introduced in 2005 by Melges Performance Sailboats, the 17 is a departure from traditional scow design. It has an asymmetrical spinnaker and retractable bowsprit, a high-roach full-battened mainsail, and unusually long and thin rudder and bilgeboards.
- Butterfly: This small scow is meant to be sailed by one person. It features a cat rig, and unlike the boats above, it has a daggerboard.

Contrary to the connotations of the old definition of "scow" (large and slow), the inland lake scows are extremely fast—the wide, flat bottom hull allows them to plane easily. As a consequence of this, the A scow is the highest rated centerboard boat according to the US Portsmouth yardstick numbers.

== Alternative design ==
A 'semi-flying' scow that uses a host of design tricks, including wings/foils and a telescopic canting keel, a retractable bowsprit and an asymmetrical spinnaker, has been designed in France.
