= The Wackiest Ship in the Army (TV series) =

American television series 1965-1966

- Genre: Comedy drama
- Created by: Danny Arnold; Herbert Margolis
- Based on: the story "Big Fella Wash-Wash" by Herbert Carlson, in the July 1956 issue of Argosy
- Starring: Jack Warden; Gary Collins; Mike Kellin; Mark Slade
- Theme music composer: Howard Greenfield; Jack Keller; Helen Miller
- Composer: Nelson Riddle
- Country of origin: United States
- Original language: English
- No. of seasons: 1
- No. of episodes: 29

Production
- Executive producer: Harry Ackerman
- Producers: Herbert Hirschman; Joseph Dackow
- Running time: 45–48 minutes
- Production companies: Herbert Margolis Productions; Joseph M. Schenck Productions; Screen Gems

Original release
- Network: NBC
- Release: September 19, 1965 – April 17, 1966

Gary Collins, left, and Jack Warden in The Wackiest Ship in the Army.

The Wackiest Ship in the Army is an American comedy drama adventure television series that aired for one season on NBC between September 19, 1965, and April 17, 1966. Produced by Harry Ackerman and Herbert Hirschman, the series was loosely based on the 1960 film starring Jack Lemmon and Ricky Nelson, which itself was a fictionalized account of a real wartime vessel.

Although often referred to as a comedy series, the show violated three unwritten rules that unofficially defined TV sitcoms at the time: It was an hour in length (almost all comedy series were only a half-hour, and the few attempts at hour sitcoms were unsuccessful), it had no laugh track, and characters were sometimes killed in it.

== Synopsis ==
The series is set in the Pacific theater of World War II and centers on the crew of the USS Kiwi, a leaky, wooden, twin-masted schooner whose mission is to carry out covert missions behind Japanese lines. Her old-fashioned, noncombatant appearance works in her favor, and she sails under false colors (the Swiss flag) when in enemy waters. The Kiwi is jointly commanded by United States Army Major Simon Butcher (Jack Warden), who is in charge of shore operations, and United States Navy Lieutenant (junior grade) Richard "Rip" Riddle (Gary Collins), who is in command of the vessel at sea. The crew consists of:

- Mike Kellin: Chief Petty Officer Willie Miller (also in the 1960 film, and listed in the series opening credits)
- Mark Slade: Radioman Third Class Patrick Hollis
- Fred Smoot: Machinist Mate Third Class Seymour Trivers
- Rudy Solari: Gunner's Mate Second Class Sherman Nagurski
- Don Penny: Pharmacist Mate Third Class Charles Tyler, ship's cook

On the pilot episode Shakedown and The Stowaway, the crew featured one extra member, Seaman First Class Roger D. Finch played by stuntman Phil Adams who had also played a crew member in the original film.

== Notable guest stars ==
Guest stars included:

- James Hong: Agaki (three episodes)
- Jill Ireland
- Lou Krugman
- Robert Loggia
- Harry Morgan
- Chips Rafferty (also in the 1960 film)
- George Takei
- Jack Soo

== Production notes ==
The theme music and scoring were by Nelson Riddle.

=== Ship ===
The USS Kiwi was based on the real-life USS Echo, a 40-year-old schooner (or scow) that the Government of New Zealand transferred to the United States Navy during World War II. The United States returned her to New Zealand in 1944. The Echo was broken up in 2015 due to her poor material conditioning following her use as a bar which had closed in 2013.

== In other media ==
A paperback novelisation based on the series, by Lee Bergman, was released in 1965.

== Broadcast history ==
The Wackiest Ship in the Army premiered on NBC on September 19, 1965. It lasted a single season, and the last of its 29 original episodes aired on April 17, 1966. Prime-time reruns of The Wackiest Ship in the Army followed in its regular time slot on NBC until September 4, 1966. The show aired at 10:00 p.m. on Sunday throughout its run.

== Episode list ==
No.	Title	Directed by	Written by	Original release date
1	"Shakedown"	Danny Arnold	Danny Arnold	September 19, 1965
The pilot for the series. The inexperienced Butcher is introduced to his ship, assignment, and crew — and instantly loathes them all. Guest stars: Karen Steele, Jack Soo, and James Hong.
2	"The Sisters"	Unknown	Unknown	September 26, 1965
The Kiwi sails to the island of Kenajora to drop off female radio engineers disguised as missionaries there. Guest stars: Diana Hyland, Patricia Dunne, Antoinette Bower, and Irene Tsu.
3	"Goldbrickers"	Unknown	Unknown	October 3, 1965
Alternate title "Gold Snatchers." The Kiwi heads for Manila to retrieve four tons of U.S. gold bullion left in the dubious care of a headhunter. Guest stars: Michael Ansara and George Takei.
4	"The Day the Crew Paced the Deck"	Robert Stevens	Sam Perrin & Arnold Belgard	October 10, 1965
A trader on a Japanese-held island volunteers to spy for the Allies if the Kiwi takes his wife out of danger. Guest stars: Ford Rainey and June Dayton.
5	"The Colonel and the Geisha"	Unknown	Unknown	October 17, 1965
Butcher and Riddle try to rescue a defecting Japanese officer. Guest stars: Nobu McCarthy and David Chow.
6	"Bottoms Up"	Unknown	Unknown	October 24, 1965
The Kiwi sails to Aranuk Island to pick up a British agent. Guest stars: William Glover and Anne Sargent.
7	"The Stowaway"	Richard C. Sarafian	Jack Sher	October 31, 1965
Eager to learn how a two-masted schooner became involved in World War II, newspaper reporter Lori Adams stows away aboard the Kiwi. Guest star: Ruta Lee.
8	"Boomer McKye"	Joseph Sargent	Marion Hargrove	November 7, 1965
The United States Army orders the Kiwi to locate a rare plant believed to provide a remedy for malaria and hires a flamboyant con man to direct her during the voyage. Guest stars: Chips Rafferty, Leon Lontoc, Hedley Mattingley, Joe Higgins, Maurice Dillimore, and Clive Wayne.
9	"Vive La Kiwi"	Unknown	Unknown	November 14, 1965
The Kiwi′s crew receives orders to infiltrate a Vichy French arms shipment and steal it. Guest stars: Hans Gudegast, Andre Phillippe, and Milton Selzer.
10	"The Lady and the Luluai"	Unknown	Unknown	November 21, 1965
The Kiwi′s crew tries to ransom two servicemen from a tribe of headhunters. Guest stars: Harry Morgan, Hazel Court, Rupert Crosse, and Peter Brooks.
11	"A Shade of Kaiser Bill"	Leo Penn	Story by : Mary Loos & Richard Sale; Teleplay by : Richard Sale	November 28, 1965
When the Kiwi′s crew arrives at a South Pacific island to destroy radio and radar equipment there, they encounter a World War I German officer and his daughters. Guest stars: Barbara Shelley, Oscar Beregi, Greg Mullavey, and Grant Woods.
12	"...and Tyler, Too"	Murray Golden	Sam Perrin & Arnold Belgard	December 5, 1965
The Kiwi′s cook is transferred elsewhere, and her crew must adjust to his haughty replacement. Guest stars: Jack Collins, Jack Dodson, Herbert Voland, and Steven Bell.
13	"Last Path to Garcia"	Unknown	Unknown	December 12, 1965
The Kiwi receives orders to pick up a Filipino resistance leader, and a female guerrilla fighter offers to lead the Kiwi′s crew to him. Guest stars: Barbara Luna and Keye Luke.
14	"I'm Dreaming of a Wide Isthmus"	Herschel Daugherty	Story by : Bill Jacobson & Ed Adamson; Teleplay by : John O'Dea, Arthur Rowe, Bill Jacobson & Ed Adamson	December 19, 1965
The Kiwi receives orders to infiltrate a Japanese-held island and demolish a supply depot there.
15	"The Lamb Who Hunted Wolves: Part 1"	Robert Totten	Story by : Robert Buckner; Teleplay by : John O'Dea & Arthur Rowe and Robert Buckner	January 2, 1966
The Kiwi receives orders to rescue 25 Americans from a Japanese prisoner-of-war camp. Guest stars: John Anderson, Gail Kobe, Joseph Turkel, Richard Loo, James Hong, and Butch Cavell.
16	"The Lamb Who Hunted Wolves: Part 2"	Robert Totten	Story by : Robert Buckner; Teleplay by : John O'Dea & Arthur Rowe	January 9, 1966
Butcher is trapped in a Japanese prisoner-of-war camp. Guest stars: John Anderson, Gail Kobe, Joseph Turkel, Richard Loo, James Hong, and Butch Cavell.
17	"What is Honor — A Word?"	Harmon Jones	Story by : Danny Arnold; Teleplay by : Julian Barry	January 16, 1966
Butcher lands on what is supposedly a deserted island to carry out a pre-invasion reconnaissance mission. Guest star: Robert Loggia.
18	"Hail the Chief"	Alex Nicol	Sam Perrin & Arnold Belgard	January 30, 1966
The Kiwi′s crew must set up an observation post in Japanese-held waters to observe and report on Japanese ship traffic. Guest star: Leon Lontoc.
19	"Liberty Was a Lady"	Mark Rydell	John O'Dea & Arthur Rowe	February 6, 1966
While on leave in Brisbane, Australia, Riddle falls in love with an attractive civil defense worker, not knowing that she is married to an Australian man who is missing in action, but the man returns, ending their affair. The Kiwi then takes an Australian special forces diver known as Jocko on a mission to plant underwater explosives on a Japanese ship in a harbor. While Jocko is swimming into the harbor, Riddle learns that he is the woman's husband. Jocko becomes entangled in nets and the Japanese send divers into the water after him, so Riddle swims to his rescue, then tries to help him plant the explosives. Jocko cuts Riddle's air hose to force him to return to the Kiwi, then carries on alone and is killed when the explosives detonate. In Australia, Jocko's guilt-ridden widow puts a final end to her affair with Riddle. Guest stars: Jill Ireland and Lou Antonio.
20	"My Father's Keeper"	Unknown	Unknown	February 13, 1966
Chief Petty Officer Miller's father is a lifelong Navy man who is coming to visit Miller while the Kiwi is in port at Brisbane, Australia — and this poses a problem for Miller, because his father thinks he is serving aboard an aircraft carrier. Guest stars: George Takei and Harry Bellaver.
21	"Brother Love"	Robert Totten	Herbert Margolis	February 20, 1966
The Kiwi′s crew must evacuate a group of Australian women who have been posing as missionary workers. Guest stars: Barbara Shelley and Antoinette Bower.
22	"And Two If by Sea"	Unknown	Unknown	February 27, 1966
The Kiwi receives orders to sink a submarine that is carrying a Japanese admiral to New Guinea. Guest star: Lloyd Bochner.
23	"The Ghost of Lord Nelson-san"	Claudio Guzman	Stephen Kandel	March 6, 1966
The Kiwi′s crew must determine whether an Allied coastwatcher is also working for the Japanese. Guest star: Nancy Kovak.
24	"Voyage to Never Never"	E. W. Swackhamer	John O'Dea & Arthur Rowe	March 13, 1966
The Kiwi receives an assignment to destroy a Japanese submarine base. Guest star: John Holland.
25	"The Girl in the Polka-Dot Swimsuit"	Unknown	Unknown	March 20, 1966
During a visit to Hog Island, the Kiwi′s crew hunts wild boar and holds a cookout. Guest stars: Sharon Farrell, Aki Aleong, Tad Horino, George Zalma, and Kenneth Chung.
26	"Chinese Checkers"	Unknown	Unknown	March 27, 1966
Four men aboard the Kiwi plan to mutiny and steal her cargo of gold. Guest stars: Ellen Madison and William Bramley.
27	"My Island"	Claudio Guzman	Story by : Danny Arnold; Teleplay by : Julian Barry	April 3, 1966
The Kiwi′s crew has fallen ill with fever, and she must make port as soon as possible to get medical attention for her men — but a storm has knocked out her radio and engines and shredded her sails. Guest star: Stefan Schnabel.
28	"Fun Has More Blondes"	Unknown	Unknown	April 10, 1966
The Kiwi has orders to transport Garvin Stone wherever he wants to go. During the voyage, Stone will talk about his destination, but not about anything else — and the crew eventually discovers that his mission is to assassinate an imprisoned Women's Army Corps major before she can reveal any secrets to the Japanese. Guest stars: Felice Orlandi and Leonard Strong.
29	"Routine Assignment"	Unknown	Unknown	April 17, 1966
Riddle wants to go to the aid of islanders who have sent out a distress call, but Butcher is sure it is a Japanese trap. It turns out to be a trap — but one set by pirates, not the Japanese. Guest stars: Raymond St. Jacques and Vito Scotti.
