= Niagara Scow =

Shipwreck upstream of Niagara Falls

Coordinates: 43°04′23″N 79°04′15″W

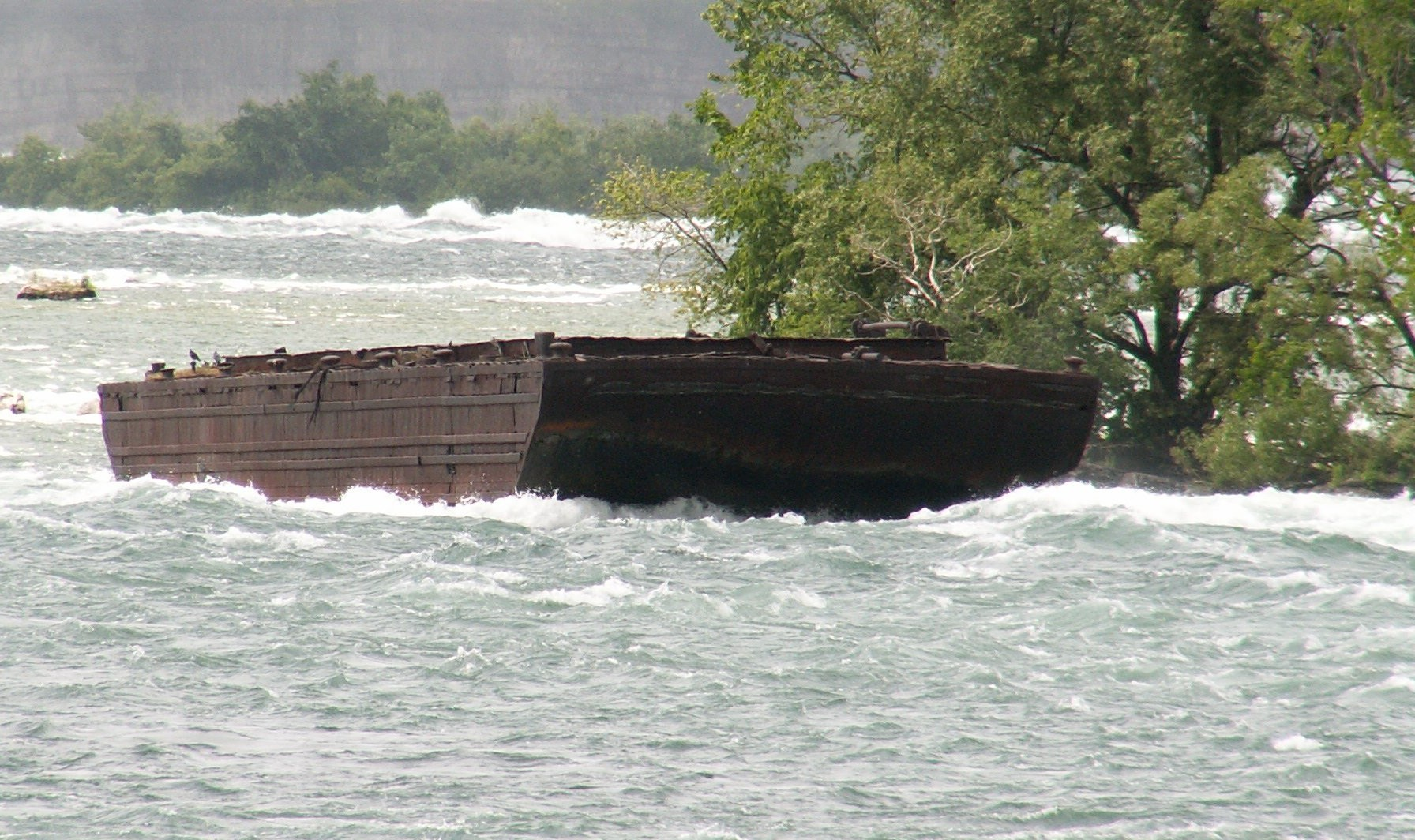
The Niagara Scow (2006)

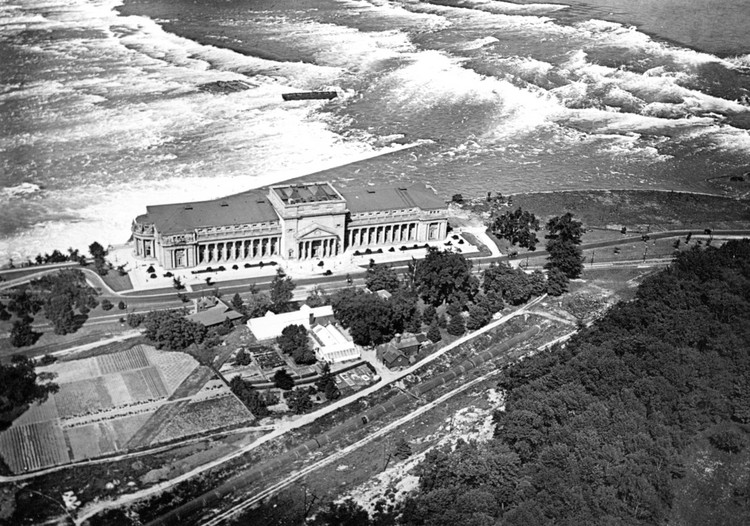
View of the Toronto Power House with the scow in the background (1922)

The Niagara Scow (also called the Old Scow or Iron Scow) is the unofficial name of the wreck of a small scow that brought two men perilously close to plunging over the Horseshoe Falls, the largest of the Niagara Falls, in 1918. The wreck can still be seen, upstream of the falls.

== 1918 event ==
On August 6, 1918, Gustave F. Lofberg and Frank Harris were aboard the Great Lakes Dredge and Docks Company scow dredging up sand banks from the Niagara River upstream of the waterfall. When tugboat Captain John Wallace brought the Hassayampa over to bring the scow back to shore, it broke loose and began floating downriver rapidly towards the falls.

There are conflicting reports whether Lofberg and Harris were able to release the false bottom of the scow to dump their load of sand and silt. Regardless, the boat got caught on a rock shoal 838 yards (766 m) from the edge of the falls, leaving the two Niagara Falls Power Company employees stranded in the middle of the raging torrents of water. Later reports suggest that Lofberg had tied a rope between himself and the scow as a safety precaution lest he fall overboard while the scow was still beached, while Harris tied one between himself and a free barrel.

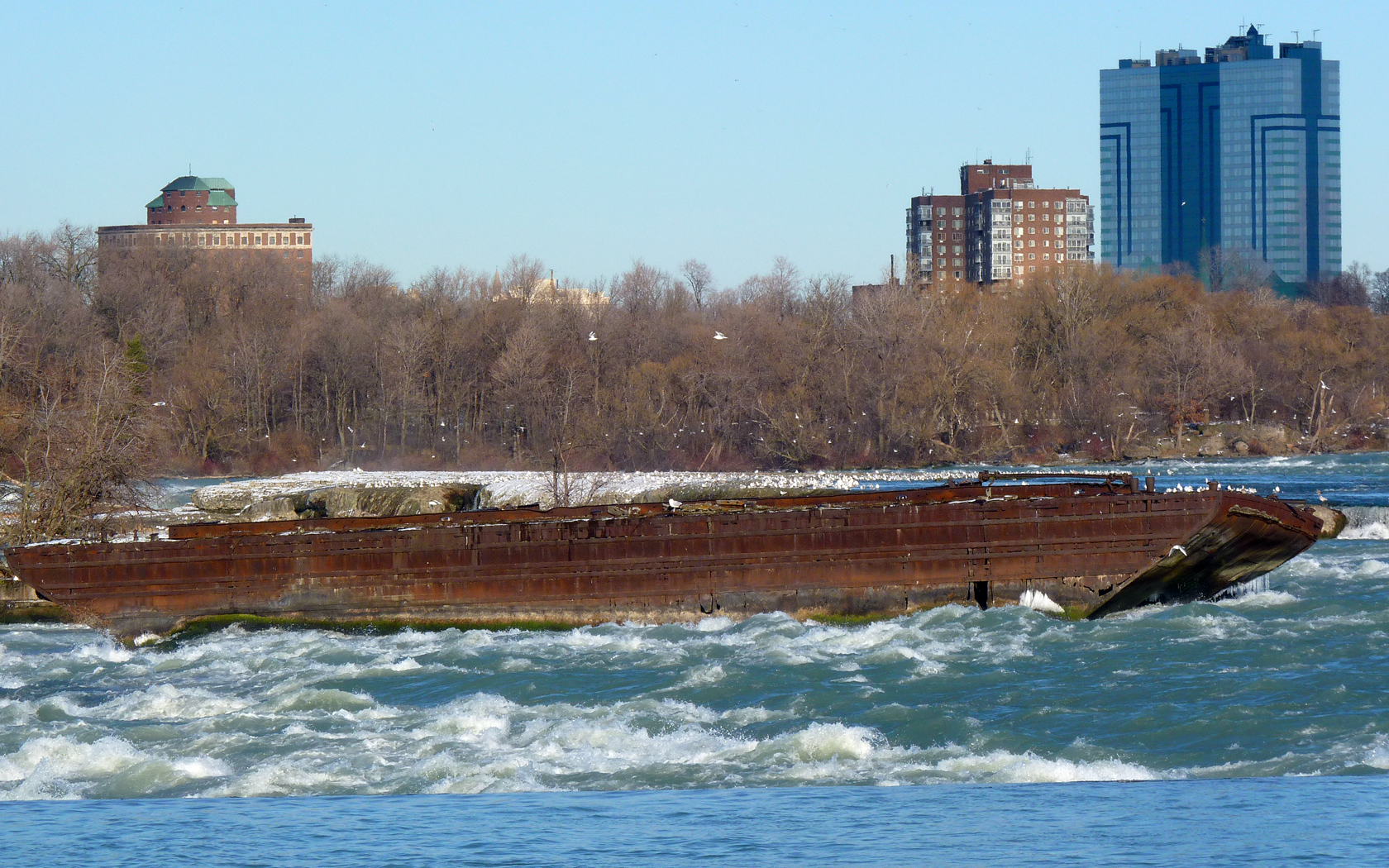
Niagara Scow (2009)

Since a rescue boat was out of the question, the Niagara Falls (Ontario) Fire Department tried using a grappling gun to shoot a life line out towards the barge, from atop the roof of the Toronto Power House while awaiting the arrival of the US Coast Guard from Youngstown, New York, to bring a heavier grappling gun. When the US Coast Guard arrived, they managed to send a lifeline over to the barge, and both marooned men made it safely back to shore via breeches buoy, 17 hours after they first found themselves drifting towards the falls. The work of riverman William "Red" Hill Sr. was particularly significant; he ventured out to free the tangled breeches buoy line several times throughout the night, and eventually assisted the men to safety. Hill was awarded the Royal Canadian Humane Association Medal for his efforts. Hill and his sons went on to be involved in many other river rescues and recoveries in the next several decades.

In 2018, the Parks Commission celebrated the 100th anniversary of the rescue, particularly Hill's role, and installed a new plaque and panels depicting the event.

== 2019 shift ==
The wreck has been deteriorating over the years. During a storm (a remnant of Tropical Storm Olga) on the evening of October 31, 2019, strong southwest winds raised Lake Erie's East Basin water levels to record highs. This resulted in record high flows into the Niagara River at Fort Erie, exceeding 420,000 cubic feet per second (12,000 m^{3}/s) as observed at the International Control Works by on shift River Control Supervisor. The net flow over Niagara Falls, after the power companies' draw, exceeded 230,000 cubic feet per second (6,400 m^{3}/s)as per on shift River Control Supervisor. These record high flows shifted the historic iron scow off the rock outcrop, allowing it to drift closer to the edge of the falls. The scow floated an estimated 50 yards (46 m) downriver, and the wreck seemed to have "flipped on its side and spun around", according to a source at the Niagara Parks Commission. A Niagara Parks photo of the wreck confirmed that it was now lying on its side.

== 2020s breakups, movements ==
On April 4, 2022, the scow was observed to have broken into several pieces lodged in the rapids. A Niagara Parks official reported that it may be "reaching the end of its life."

On November 20, 2025, the bow of the scow, one of the pieces that had broken off the main body in 2022, dislodged and moved farther downstream.

== Subchaser Sunbeam ==
A similar wreck, involving a wooden vessel, occurred in June 1923. The craft, previously a World War I antisubmarine patrol boat called the Sunbeam, had been returned to its owner, a New Yorker, after the war ended. The owner sold the boat to a new owner, and the boat was taken west on the Erie Canal, to be docked at a port in Lake Erie. The crew made a navigation mistake and found themselves well into the Niagara River, although still "a few" miles (kilometers) upstream from the falls. They retired for the night to a nearby hotel. During the night, the unmanned boat came loose from its moorings.

The current carried the craft to the vicinity of the scow, and it likewise became caught in the shoals. The owners sold the wreck to Red Hill for one dollar, but Hill decided that the salvage cost was too high, particularly because the Parks Commission wanted a cash bond that would cover any damage caused during the process. As a result, the boat remained marooned and by the late 1930s had broken apart. A 2014 report stated that some people claim that some of its metallic parts (such as the boilers and propeller shaft) are still visible at times when a significant quantity of water is being diverted for hydropower production.

== See also ==
- List of shipwrecks in the Great Lakes
