= Mike Kellin =

American actor (1922–1983)

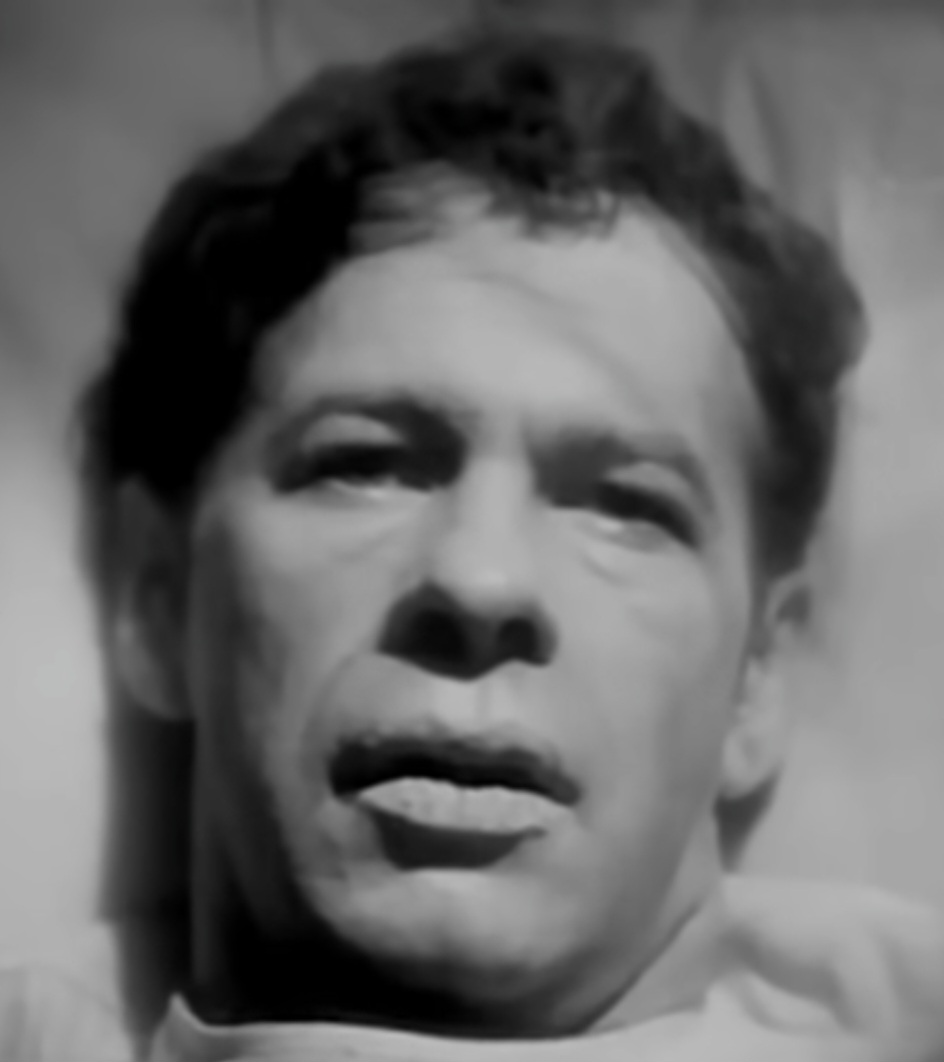
- Kellin in an episode of One Step Beyond (1960)
- Born: Myron Kellin; April 26, 1922; Hartford, Connecticut, U.S.
- Died: August 26, 1983 (aged 61); Nyack, New York, U.S.
- Resting place: Emanuel Synagogue Cemetery, Wethersfield, Connecticut
- Education: Boston University; Trinity College, Connecticut (BA); Yale University (MFA)
- Occupation: Actor
- Years active: 1949–1982
- Spouse(s): Nina Caiserman Kellin (m. 1951; died 1963) Sally Moffat (m. 1966)
- Children: 1
- Relatives: Sylvia Field (mother-in-law)
- Awards: See below
- Military career
- Allegiance: United States
- Branch: United States Navy
- Rank: Lieutenant commander
- Conflicts: World War II

Myron "Mike" Kellin (April 26, 1922 – August 26, 1983) was an American stage and screen actor. He won an Obie Award for his performance in the original Off-Broadway run of American Buffalo, and was nominated for a Tony Award for the Broadway musical Pipe Dream. He was also known for his starring role as Chief Petty Officer Willie Miller on the 1960s television sitcom The Wackiest Ship in the Army.

== Early life and education ==
Kellin was born in Hartford, Connecticut. He was the son of Sophia and Samuel Kellin, Russian-Jewish immigrants. His younger sister, Shirley Ann Kellin (born August 14, 1927), died in the 1944 Hartford circus fire. He was educated at Boston University and Trinity College.

Kellin served with the Navy as a lieutenant commander during World War II, and after the war, studied acting and playwriting at the Yale School of Drama.

== Career ==
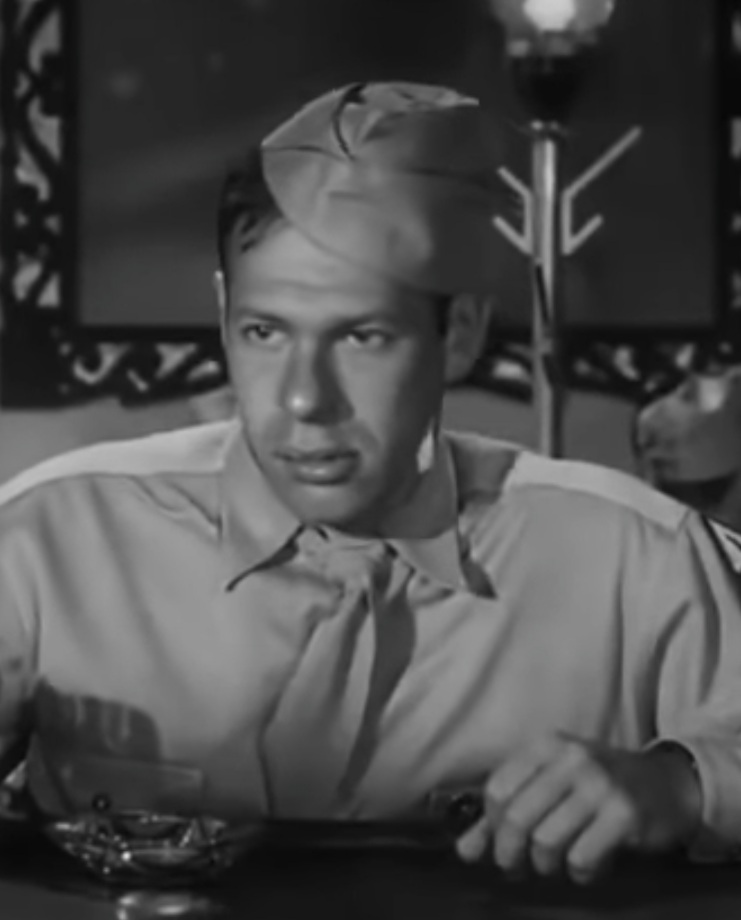
Kellin in At War with the Army (1950)

Kellin made his Broadway debut in 1949 in At War with the Army and repeated his role in the 1950 film version with Dean Martin and Jerry Lewis. He worked in some 50 plays and won an Obie Award for his work in American Buffalo. He and earned a Tony nomination in 1955 for his acting in the musical Pipe Dream.

In 1956, he contributed the song "Preserven El Parque Elysian" to a rally in support of Elysian Park. Pete Seeger recorded this song in 1965 for this album God Bless the Grass.

Kellin appeared in both the film version of The Wackiest Ship in the Army and the television series based on the film.

In 1966, Kellin appeared in "The Deadly Games of Gamma 6" episode on Lost in Space as Myko. Later he starred on the TV Western series Gunsmoke. He also appeared in "The Thirty Fathom Grave" episode of The Twilight Zone and as a Southerner in The Alfred Hitchcock Hour episode "Night of the Owl."

== Personal life ==
Kellin married Nina Caiserman in 1952. The couple adopted a daughter before Nina's death in 1963. In 1966, Kellin married actress Sally Moffat, daughter of actress Sylvia Field.

Kellin was an advocate for prisoners' rights. Between 1968 and 1973, he was appointed to the Rockland County Legislature's Blue Ribbon Commission on Criminal Justice. He was also active in the Fortune Society.

=== Death ===
He died on August 26, 1983, from lung cancer in Nyack, New York, at the age of 61. His interment was at Emanuel Synagogue Cemetery in Wethersfield, Connecticut.

== Stage credits (partial) ==
- King Lear (1982) as King Lear
- Are You Now or Have You Ever Been (1979) as Lionel Stander
- The Ritz (1975) as Carmine Vespucci
- The Odd Couple (1966) as Oscar Madison
- Mother Courage and Her Children (1963) as Cook
- Rhinoceros (1961) as Dribble
- God and Kate Murphy (1959) as Sean Murphy
- Pipe Dream (1955) as Hazel
- Ankles Aweigh (1955) as Joe Mancinni
- The Emperor's Clothes (1953) as Second Rottenbiller Brother
- Stalag 17 (1951) as Stosh
- The Bird Cage (1950) as Frank
- At War with the Army (1950) as Staff Sergeant McVay

== Film credits ==
- So Young So Bad (1950) as Carousel Operator (uncredited)
- At War with the Army (1950) as Sergeant McVey
- Hurricane Smith (1952) as Dicer
- Lonelyhearts (1958) as Frank Goldsmith
- The Wonderful Country (1959) as Pancho Gil
- The Mountain Road (1960) as Prince
- The Wackiest Ship in the Army (1960) as Chief Petty Officer MacCarthy
- The Great Imposter (1961) as Clifford Thompson
- Hell Is for Heroes (1962) as Private Kolinsky
- Invitation to a Gunfighter (1964) as Blind Union Vet
- Banning (1967) as Harry Kalielle
- The Incident (1967) as Harry Purvis
- The Boston Strangler (1968) as Julian Soshnick
- Riot (1969) as Bugsy
- The Maltese Bippy (1969) (uncredited)
- The Phynx (1970) as Bogey
- The People Next Door (1970) as Dr. Margolin
- Cover Me Babe (1970) as The Derelict
- Fools' Parade (1971) as Steve Mystic
- The Last Porno Flick (1974) as Boris
- Freebie and the Bean (1974) as Lieutenant Rosen
- Next Stop, Greenwich Village (1976) as Ben Lapinsky
- God Told Me To (1976) as Deputy Commissioner
- Midnight Express (1978) as Mr. Hayes
- Girlfriends (1978) as Abe
- On the Yard (1978) as Red
- The Jazz Singer (1980) as Leo
- So Fine (1981) as Sam Schlotzman
- Just Before Dawn (1981) as Ty
- Paternity (1981) as Tour Guide
- Echoes (1982) as Sid Berman
- Sleepaway Camp (1983) as Mel (final film role, posthumous release)

== Television credits ==
He was very active in television and was a regular on:

- Mister Peepers (TV series) (1952) as Edward Barnes
- Bonino (1953) as Rusty
- Honestly, Celeste! (1954) as Marty Gordon
- Have Gun Will Travel TV series(1958) S2 E13 "The Solid Gold Patrol" as Sgt. Siebert
- The Wackiest Ship in the Army (1965–66) as C.P.O. Willie Miller
- Seventh Avenue, a mini-series (1977) as Morris Blackman
- Fitz and Bones (1981) as Robert Whitmore
- Combat! (1965) Episode "Losers Cry Deal"

He also appeared in made-for-TV movies, including:

- Assignment: Munich (1972) as Gus
- The Catcher (1972) as Mike Keller
- The Connection (1973) as Pillo
- F.D.R.: the Last Year (1980) as Andre Gromyko

He guest starred on the following:

- Alfred Hitchcock Presents (1958) (Season 4 Episode 11: "And the Desert Shall Blossom") as Killer
- Have Gun, Will Travel (1958) (Season 2 Episode 13: "The Solid Gold Patrol") as Sergeant Major Siebert
- The Rifleman (1959) (Season 2 Episode 14: "Surveyors") as Len Sommers
- Naked City (1959-1963)
  - (Season 1 Episode 32: "The Sandman") (1959) as Billy Ketch
  - (Season 2 Episode 18: "The Deadly Guinea Pig") (1961) as Anton
  - (Season 4 Episode 33: "Golden Lads and Girls") (1963) as Louis Wystemski
- Alcoa Presents: One Step Beyond (1960) (Season 3 Episode 8: "The Trap") as Dominic DiNovio / Fredrick Gibbs
- The Untouchables (1960-1961)
  - (Season 1 Episode 14: The Noise of Death") (1960) as Abe Garfinkel
  - (Season 1 Episode 22: "The White Slavers") (1960) as Mig Torrance
  - (Season 3 Episode 9: "City Without a Name") (1961) as Lou Mungo
- Have Gun, Will Travel (1961) (Season 4 Episode 20: "Shadow of a Man") as Logan Adcock
- Have Gun, Will Travel (1961) (Season 4 Episode 28: "The Siege") as Alvah Brent
- Have Gun, Will Travel (1961) (Season 5 Episode 12: "Drop of Blood") as Faivel Melamed
- Route 66 (1961) (Season 2 Episode 4: "Birdcage on My Foot") as Lieutenant Calder
- Route 66 (1962) (Season 3 Episode 11: "Hey Moth, Come Eat the Flame") as Art Hannibal
- The Alfred Hitchcock Hour (1962) (Season 1 Episode 3: "Night of the Owl") as O.D. Parker
- The Twilight Zone (1963) (Season 4 Episode 2: "The Thirty-Fathom Grave") as Chief Bell
- Voyage to the Bottom of the Sea (1964) (Season 1 Episode 4: "Mist of Silence") as Steban
- Combat! (1965) (Season 3 Episode 18: "Losers Cry Deal") as Jackson
- Lost in Space (1966) (Season 2 Episode 8: "The Deadly Games of Gamma 6") as Myko
- Gunsmoke (1966) (Season 12 Episode 13: "The Moonstone") as Chad Timpson
- Starsky and Hutch (1976) (Season 2 Episode 5: "Gillian") as Al Grossman
- All in the Family (1976) (Season 7 Episode 12: "Archie's Secret Passion") as Bummie Fencel
- Barney Miller (1976) (Season 3 Episode 8: "Non-Involvement") as Al Mitchell
- Galactica 1980 (1980) (Season 1 Episode 4: "The Super Scouts") as Stockton
- Galactica 1980 (1980) (Season 1 Episode 5: "The Super Scouts: Part 2") as John Stockton

== Discography ==
- Tevya and His Daughters, Columbia Masterworks OL 5225 (1957)
- And the Testimony's Still Coming, Verve Forecast FTS-3028 (1967)

== Awards and nominations ==
Award	Year	Category	Work	Result	Ref.
Obie Award	1976	Distinguished Performance by an Actor	American Buffalo	Won	
Tony Award	1956	Best Featured Actor in a Musical	Pipe Dream	Nominated	
