= USS Echo =

Former US Navy unclassified miscellaneous vessel

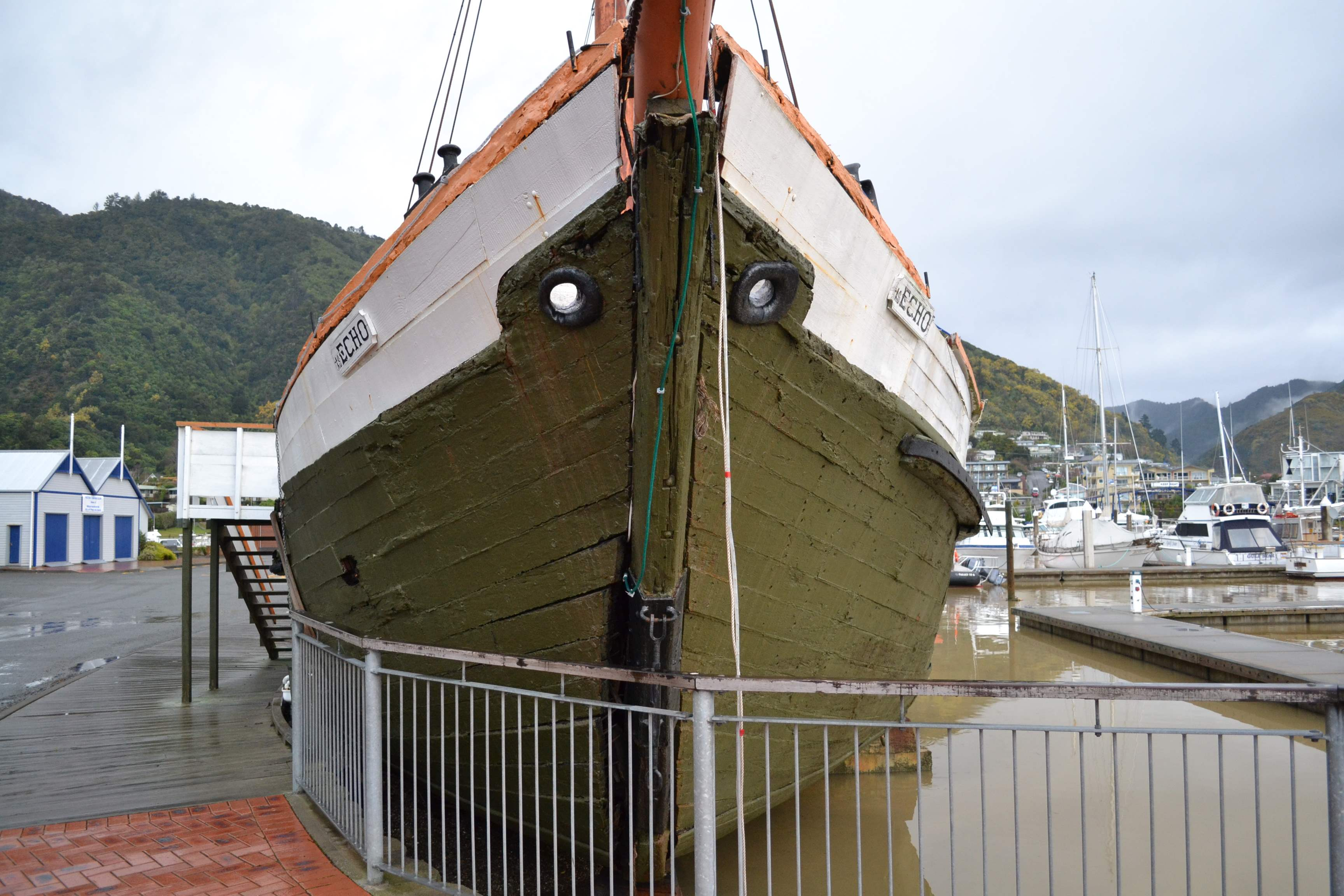
- The two masted scow Echo, formerly USS Echo (IX-95), photographed at Picton Harbour, New Zealand in August 2013

History

United States
- Laid down: 1905
- Commissioned: 4 November 1942
- Decommissioned: 15 March 1944
- Fate: Broken up April 2015

General characteristics
- Displacement: 132 long tons (134 t)
- Length: 104 ft (32 m)
- Beam: 26 ft (7.9 m)
- Draft: 6.1 ft (1.9 m)

USS Echo (IX-95), an unclassified miscellaneous vessel, was the only ship of the United States Navy to be named for the nymph Echo. A sailing scow, she was used as a supply ship in the South Pacific from 1942 to 1944.

== History ==
A twin-masted scow (flat-bottomed schooner) of New Zealand registry, Echo was built in New Zealand in 1905 by William Brown, of kauri timber. She was originally topsail rigged. Twin diesel engines were installed in 1920.

She was transferred to the US Navy under reverse Lend-Lease from New Zealand and commissioned on 4 November 1942.

Sailing from Auckland on 11 November 1942, Echo delivered cargo at Noumea en route to Efate in the New Hebrides. Based on this island at Port Vila, she served as a supply ship for the United States Army in the New Hebrides and adjoining island groups as well as placing and supporting Coastwatchers. On 14 February 1944, just prior to her departure for New Zealand, the Army awarded her crew a commendation. She arrived at Wellington on 12 March 1944, was decommissioned three days later, and returned to the New Zealand Government.

== Film and TV series ==
In 1942–44 she was used by US forces in the Pacific, and her story was the basis for the 1960 film with Jack Lemmon, The Wackiest Ship in the Army and the 1965 TV series of the same name. The storyline involved a secret mission with an Australian Coastwatcher, played by Chips Rafferty.

== Postwar ==
She was in use carrying cargo from Marlborough to Wellington until 1965, and hence was not available for the film. She was then used from 1972 as clubrooms by the Marlborough Cruising Club, but she deteriorated, and was nearly broken up in 1990. She was preserved, but in poor condition, at Picton, New Zealand as the Echo Gallery, a scow museum and bar. After the bar closed and the ship deteriorated more, Port Marlborough bought the ship from its private owners, and she was broken up in April 2015.
