= West Wight Potter 15 =

Recreational keelboat first built 1979

Development
- Designer: Stanley T. Smith and Herb Stewart
- Location: United States
- Year: 1979
- No. built: 2600
- Builder: International Marine
- Role: pocket cruiser
- Name: West Wight Potter 15

Boat
- Displacement: 475 lb (215 kg)
- Draft: 3.00 ft (0.91 m)

Hull
- Type: Monohull
- Construction: Fiberglass
- LOA: 15.00 ft (4.57 m)
- LWL: 11.83 ft (3.61 m)
- Beam: 5.50 ft (1.68 m)
- Engine: Outboard motor

Hull appendages
- Keel: lifting keel
- Ballast: 165 lb (75 kg)
- Rudder: transom-mounted rudder

Rig
- Rig type: Bermuda rig

Sails
- Sailplan: Fractional rigged sloop
- Mainsail area: 68 sq ft (6.3 m^{2})
- Jib/genoa area: 43 sq ft (4.0 m^{2})
- Spinnaker area: 85 sq ft (7.9 m^{2})
- Total sail area: 111 sq ft (10.3 m^{2})

Racing
- D-PN: 135.8

The West Wight Potter 15 is a keelboat first built in 1979 by International Marine of Inglewood, California. Still in production, 2600 boats have been completed.

== Design ==
It was designed by Stanley T. Smith and Herb Stewart as a development of the British West Wight Potter 14. The original English design had a gunter rig and was built from plywood. Stewart used a plywood hull as a plug and created a mold for making fiberglass hulls at the same time the gunter rig was changed to a Marconi rig. The design uses a long sail batten to hold the leech out, giving an appearance similar to a gaff rig. The design has undergone continuous improvement over its production run. A mark II version was introduced in 1982.

The International Marine built version is made predominantly of fiberglass, with mahogany wood trim. The hull has a spooned raked stem, a conventional transom, a transom-hung, kick-up rudder controlled by a tiller and a weighted, galvanized steel centerboard. The boat is equipped with foam flotation and self-bailing cockpit.

It has a fractional sloop rig with aluminum spars. With the addition of adjustable twin backstays the boat can be equipped with an asymmetrical spinnaker of 69 sq ft (6.4 m^{2}) or a conventional spinnaker of 85 sq ft (7.9 m^{2}).

The boat has a draft of 3.00 ft (0.91 m) with the centerboard extended and 7 in (18 cm) with it retracted, allowing beaching or ground transportation on a trailer.

A bracket is standard equipment and the boat is normally fitted with a small outboard motor of 2 hp (1 kW) for docking and maneuvering.

The design has sleeping accommodation for two people, with two 78 in (200 cm) bunks in the cabin bow. The cabin has 45 in (110 cm) of headroom and the companionway hatch folds into a small table. A cockpit tent is a common owner addition.

The design has a Portsmouth Yardstick racing average handicap of 135.8 and a hull speed of 4.5 kn (8.3 km/h).

== Operational history ==
The boat has been sailed single-handed from Seattle, Washington to Ketchikan, Alaska and also from England to Sweden, across the North Atlantic Ocean.

== Reception ==
In a 2010 review Steve Henkel wrote, "best features: Long-distance cruisers have taken modified versions from California to Hawaii, and from Seattle to Alaska, indicating relatively good stability and ease of handling, despite her tiny lightweight hull and narrow beam, With very shallow draft and a relatively flat V-bottom, she is beachable and easy to launch; her “unsinkable” hull has positive foam flotation. Worst features: She has very little space below (ignoring the hard-to-access space under the cockpit). A centerboard fills the central space in the cabin, so there's no footwell: you must sit cross-legged on the berthtop, and finding a convenient place to use a portable toilet is problematical. Using the head in the cockpit, under a boom tent for privacy, seems to be the most practical alternative. Light-air performance is below average."
