= The Wackiest Ship in the Army (film) =

1960 film by Richard Murphy

- Theatrical release poster
- Directed by: Richard Murphy
- Screenplay by: Richard Murphy
- Story by: Herbert Margolis; William Raynor
- Based on: "Big Fella Wash-Wash"; 1956 story in Argosy by Herbert Carlson
- Produced by: Fred Kohlmar
- Starring: Jack Lemmon; Ricky Nelson; John Lund; Chips Rafferty; Tom Tully; Joby Baker; Warren Berlinger; Patricia Driscoll
- Cinematography: Charles Lawton Jr.
- Edited by: Charles Nelson
- Music by: George Duning
- Distributed by: Columbia Pictures
- Release date: December 20, 1960
- Running time: 99 minutes
- Country: United States
- Language: English
- Box office: $3.6 million

The Wackiest Ship in the Army is a 1960 American war comedy-drama film directed by Richard Murphy and starring Jack Lemmon and Ricky Nelson, with John Lund, Chips Rafferty, Tom Tully, Joby Baker, Warren Berlinger, and Patricia Driscoll. It was filmed at Pearl Harbor and Kauaʻi.

The story is a dramatized, fictionalized account of a real ship known as the USS Echo. It was a sailing vessel that originated in New Zealand and became part of the United States Navy during World War II.

== Plot ==
In 1943, U.S. Navy Lieutenant Rip Crandall, an expert yachtsman in civilian life, is based at Townsville, in Australia. He is surprised to be assigned command of a sailing ship, the USS Echo, a unique ship in the Pacific Fleet. The only crew member who knows how to work a ship with sails is eager young Ensign Tommy Hanson, who cost Crandall a yacht race with a mistake before the war.

Crandall tries to refuse this dubious command but Lieutenant commander Vandewater, Hanson and Crandall's former sailing buddy, wears down his resistance. Vandewater points out Crandall's poor fitness report and advises that, if he doesn't take this command, he will never get another. Hanson takes Crandall out drinking with some of the men so he will bond with them and feel guilty about abandoning them.

The Echo barely makes it out of the harbor, sailing straight into a storm. It arrives at Port Moresby, New Guinea, after accidentally sailing into a minefield. Crandall is supposed to train a replacement to deliver a coastwatcher named Patterson to a location only a shallow-draft vessel can reach. However, the replacement strikes Crandall as stiff-necked and unqualified to handle this kind of mission, so he takes the ship out under his own command.

Making the crossing with both ship and crew disguised as a native trading vessel, Crandall and his crew are spotted and photographed by a Japanese spotter plane. While most of the men are ashore escorting Patterson, a Japanese force from a passing warship boards the boat, capturing Crandall and the skeleton crew; when the landing party returns, they are also apprehended.

Crandall rallies his men to take the ship back. He is wounded and Hanson is faced with the decision of whether to radio a warning about the fleet, even though that will give away their position to guns on shore. He sends the warning and the decision is made to abandon ship, as the guns open fire on the Echo and destroy her.

The crew survives to be rescued and, for their role in helping to win the Battle of the Bismarck Sea, Crandall is given command of a modern destroyer while Hanson gains command of a sub chaser.

== Cast ==
- Jack Lemmon as Lt. Rip Crandall
- Ricky Nelson as Ensign Tommy J. Hanson
- John Lund as Lt. Cmdr. Wilbur F. Vandewater
- Chips Rafferty as Patterson (coast watcher)
- Tom Tully as Captain McClung
- Joby Baker as Josh Davidson
- Mike Kellin as Chief Petty Officer
- Warren Berlinger as Radioman 2nd Class A.J. Sparks
- Patricia Driscoll as Maggie, Lt. Cmdr. Vanderwater's secretary
- Richard Anderson as Lt. Dennis M. Foster
- Alvy Moore as Seaman J. Johnson
- George Shibata as Captain Shigetsu

== Production notes ==
The USS Echo was based on the real-life USS Echo (IX-95), a 40-year-old twin-masted scow (flat-bottomed schooner) that was transferred from the New Zealand government to the United States Navy in 1942, and returned to the New Zealand government in 1944.

Columbia Pictures acquired the rights to a story in the July 1956 issue of Argosy titled Big Fella Wash Wash, inspired by reminisces from former Echo skipper Meredith "Rip" Riddle. The story was advertised on the cover of the magazine as "The Wackiest Ship in the Army", because the naval vessel had been under Army command while in port, and Columbia used that title when purchasing the story in 1957. The movie never explained any connection between the ship and the Army, puzzling some viewers. (The later television series spelled out the link.) But it was mentioned in the film that the ship was under the command of the Air Force. The U.S. Army Air Forces was part of the U.S. Army until 1947.

The director and writer of the film was Richard Murphy, who had written the script for the film You're in the Navy Now (1951). The film was originally developed for Ernie Kovacs in the lead role, with Lemmon as the ensign. But at production time Kovacs was unavailable, and Lemmon was considered too mature for an ensign; Instead, Lemmon was cast in the lead role and popular actor/singer Ricky Nelson in the supporting role.

Though acquired before Operation Petticoat, this film was not released until after that film. The United States Navy provided extensive cooperation allowing the producers to film at Pearl Harbor.

Chips Rafferty played an Australian coastwatcher. There had been an increase in the interest about the role of coastwatchers due to the election of John F. Kennedy to president; he owed his life during World War II to the actions of coastwatchers.

== Reception ==
Mae Tinee of the Chicago Daily Tribune wrote, "Mr. Lemmon was perfect casting as the [harassed] lieutenant, and young Ricky Nelson is likable as Ensign Hanson. Chips Rafferty and Tom Tully also contribute good performances." She also wrote, "[I]t is, for the most part, excellent entertainment..."

Bosley Crowther of the The New York Times wrote, "Let's say it comes out a zany and occasionally amusing farce."

== Television series ==
The film inspired the 1965 television series of the same name.

== USS Echo ==
The real USS Echo was returned to the New Zealand government in 1944 and was subsequently used for the conveyance of food and supplies. It was unavailable for either the film or the later television series. The ship eventually served as a bar, but was poorly maintained over the years. In 2015, it was determined to be too derelict to preserve, and was broken up for scrap.

=== Other ships ===
List of other US Navy ships seen in the movie.

- USS Bennington (CV-20)
- USS Finch (DE-328)
- USS Lansing (DE-388)
- USS Brister (DE-327)
- USS Taluga (AO-62)
- USS Manatee (AO-58)
- USS Hamul (AD-20)
- USS Fletcher (DD-445)
- USS Philip (DD-498)
- USS Epperson (DD-719)
- USS Bagley (DD-386)
- USS Bolster (ARS-38)
- USS Reclaimer (ARS-42)
- USS Moctobi (ATF-105)
