= Centreboard =

Retractable keel which pivots out of a slot in the hull of a sailboat

A centreboard or centerboard (US) is a retractable hull appendage which pivots out of a slot in the hull of a sailboat, known as a centreboard trunk (UK) or centerboard case (US). The retractability allows the centreboard to be raised to operate in shallow waters, to move the centre of lateral resistance (offsetting changes to the sailplan that move the centre of effort aft), to reduce drag when the full area of the centreboard is not needed, or when removing the boat from the water, as when trailering. A centreboard which consists of solely a pivoting metal plate is called a centerplate; the term "centreboard" may refer to either a wooden or a metal pivoting retractable foil. A daggerboard is similar but slides vertically rather than pivoting.

The analog in a scow is a bilgeboard: these are fitted in pairs and used one at a time.

== General ==
=== History ===
Lt. John Schank (c. 1740 – 6 February 1823) was an officer of the British Royal Navy and is credited with the invention of the centerboard. Schank, however, gave credit for the idea to British Brigadier General Earl Percy. The Burlington County Times states that Joshua and Henry Swain hold patent for the centreboard. Joshua was born in Cape May County, New Jersey in 1778.

=== Purpose ===
A centreboard (often called a lifting foil in a modern racing dinghy) is used to provide lift to counter the lateral force from the sails. This is required for sailboats to move in directions other than downwind, since the force of the sail is never closer than 45 degrees to the apparent wind. Since most sailboats are symmetric along their axis of motion, when sailing upright, the lateral force can come from either side, which means that centreboards must use symmetric foil shapes so they will operate with equal efficiency on either tack. The more a yacht heels the more asymmetric its hull shape becomes.

The centerboard, daggerboard or bilgeboard can be used as a recovery platform upon which to stand, providing increased leverage, in the event the dinghy overturns via a capsize or turtle.

=== How it works ===
The efficiency of a centreboard improves with increasing aspect ratio. A long narrow centreboard produces less drag than a short, wide one for a given amount of lift, resulting in a faster boat that can point closer into the wind. A fore and aft, pivoting centreboard can also be used to move the centre of lateral resistance aft to match a change in sail plan, such as furling or dropping the jib. A retracting centreboard is more complex than a fixed keel, and most take up space inside the hull of the boat that could otherwise be used for passenger accommodation. Other types feature a casing under the boat, which does not take up space but instead has the problem of increased drag. For this reason, it is not uncommon to find boats with a combination of shallow keel and centreboard (e.g. Randmeer). The keel provides the housing for the centreboard, moving it out of the hull, but adds only a small amount of draft to the boat. The centreboard can then be lowered in deeper waters to increase the amount of lift. Ballast is usually provided in the keel, keeping the centreboard lighter and easier to handle.

Centreboards are often ballasted in keelboats and called "lifting keels" because like keels they are centred under the hull, although unlike keels, they are retractable. Ballasted centreboards are generally not locked in place when lowered; the mass of the ballast keeps them down. This also provides a measure of safety should the boat run aground—the force of impact will push the foil back into the centreboard trunk, rather than breaking it, as might happen if the board were locked in place. The mass of a ballasted foil means that a system of pulleys may be required to allow the sailor to lift the foil, and a method of latching the board in the upward position is needed. A centreboard differs from a ballast keel in that centreboards do not contribute to the stability of the vessel; their purpose is to provide lateral resistance. In small sailing dinghies it is rare to find a ballasted centreboard.

On larger sailing vessels, a similar design is sometimes incorporated to facilitate better navigation in shallow water than a fixed keel would allow. In these situations the appendage is generally referred to as a "lifting keel" (which is usually pivoted but occasionally retracted like a daggerboard) or a "swing keel".

In such installations on offshore vessels, the keel should ideally be lockable in any position, so that it does not fall back into the keel well if the vessel is inverted.

When the craft is moving, the centreboard acts as a lifting foil.

== See also ==
- Bilgeboard
- Daggerboard
- Dinghy
- Dinghy sailing
- Dinghy racing
- Leeboard
- Skeg
