= Bilgeboard =

Lifting foil used in a sailboat

A bilgeboard is a lifting foil used in a sailboat, which resembles a cross between a centerboard and a leeboard. Bilgeboards are mounted between the centerline of the boat and the sides, and are almost always asymmetric foils mounted at an angle to maximize lateral lift while minimizing drag. They are most often found on racing scows.

When sailing, the windward side bilgeboard is retracted into the hull of the boat, so that it produces no drag. The leeward side foil provides the lift to counter the lateral force of the sail, and converts it into forward motion. The bilgeboards are angled so that as the boat heels, or leans under the force of the wind, the leeward bilgeboard becomes more upright, and provides the greatest possible force in the desired direction.

Like a centerboard, the bilgeboard can be used as a recovery platform upon which to stand in the event the dinghy overturns via a capsize or turtle.

The Red Fox is a modern cruising yacht that uses bilgeboards to allow a lifting keel with minimal interference in cabin space.

When the craft is moving, the bilgeboard acts as a lifting foil.
