= Foil (fluid mechanics) =

Solid object used in fluid mechanics

A foil is a solid object with a shape such that when placed in a moving fluid at a suitable angle of attack the lift (force generated perpendicular to the fluid flow) is substantially larger than the drag (force generated parallel to the fluid flow). If the fluid is a gas, the foil is called an airfoil or aerofoil, and if the fluid is water the foil is called a hydrofoil.

== Physics of foils ==
Streamlines around a NACA 0012 airfoil at moderate angle of attack

A foil generates lift primarily because of its shape and angle of attack. When oriented at a suitable angle, the foil deflects the oncoming fluid, resulting in a force on the foil in the direction opposite to the deflection. This force can be resolved into two components: lift and drag. This "turning" of the fluid in the vicinity of the foil creates curved streamlines which results in lower pressure on one side and higher pressure on the other. This pressure difference is accompanied by a velocity difference, via Bernoulli's principle, so for foils generating lift the resulting flowfield about the foil has a higher average velocity on one surface than on the other.

A more detailed description of the flowfield is given by the simplified Navier–Stokes equations, applicable when the fluid is incompressible. And since the effects of the compressibility of air at low speeds is negligible, these simplified equations can be used for airfoils as long as the airflow is substantially less than the speed of sound (up to about Mach 0.3). For hydrofoils at high speeds, of the order of 50 knots (26 m/s) according to Faltinsen, cavitation and ventilation – with air penetrating along the strut from the water surface to the foil – may occur. Both effects may have a substantial influence on the foil's lift.

== Basic design considerations ==
The simplest type of foil is a flat plate. When set at an angle (the angle of attack) to the flow the plate will deflect the fluid passing over and under it, and this deflection will result in a lift force on the plate. However, while it does generate lift, it also generates a large amount of drag.

Since even a flat plate can generate lift, a significant factor in foil design is the minimization of drag. An example of this is the rudder of a boat or aircraft. When designing a rudder a key design factor is the minimization of drag in its neutral position, which is balanced with the need to produce sufficient lift with which to turn the craft at a reasonable rate.

Other types of foils, both natural and man-made, seen both in air and water, have features that delay or control the onset of lift-induced drag, flow separation, and stall (see Bird flight, Fin, Airfoil, Placoid scale, Tubercle, Vortex generator, Canard (close-coupled), Blown flap, Leading edge slot, Leading edge slats), as well as Wingtip vortices (see Winglet).

== Lifting ability in air and water ==
The weight a foil can lift is proportional to its lift coefficient, the density of the fluid, the foil area and its speed squared. The following shows the lifting ability of a flat plate with span 10 metres and area 10 square metres moving at a speed of 10 m/s at different altitudes and water depths. It uses the lift at an altitude of 11 km as a datum to show how the lift increases with decreasing altitude (increasing air density). It also shows the influence of ground effect and then the effect of increase in density going from air to water.

height 11 km:        lift  1.0 (datum for comparison)
       5 m                 3.4
 in ground effect          4.1
water surface-planing     1,280
just submerged            1,420
depth  5 m                2,840
     10 km                2,860

== See also ==
- Aircraft
- Bilgeboard
- Boomerang
- Centerboard
- Chord (aircraft)
- Coanda effect
- Diving plane
- Drag coefficient
- Flipper (anatomy)
- Fluid dynamics
- Formula One car
- Keel (hydrodynamic)
- Lift coefficient
- NACA airfoil
- Propeller
- Sail (aerodynamics)
- Skeg
- Spoiler (automotive)
- Surfboard fin
- Wing
